= George Ezra discography =

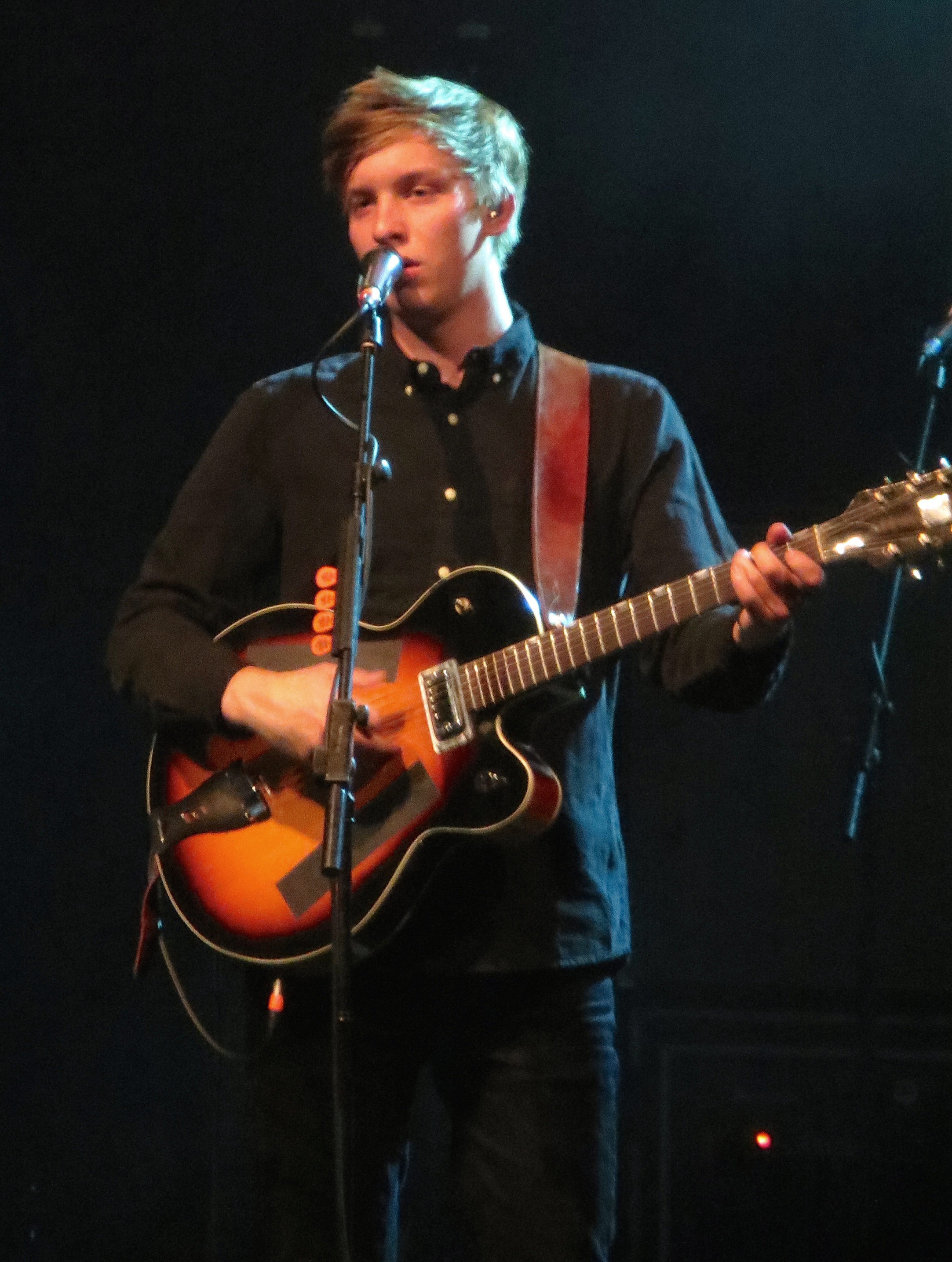
- Ezra performing in 2015
- Studio albums: 3
- EPs: 3
- Singles: 15
- Music videos: 13
- Promotional singles: 1

English musician George Ezra has released three studio albums, three extended plays, fifteen singles and thirteen music videos.

After releasing two EPs, Did You Hear the Rain? in October 2013 and Cassy O' in March 2014, Ezra rose to prominence with the release of his hit single "Budapest", which reached the top ten in numerous countries around the world, reaching number one in Austria, New Zealand and the Czech Republic.

Ezra's debut studio album Wanted on Voyage, which was released on 30 June 2014, reached number one in the UK and the top ten in seven other countries, including Australia. It was the third best-selling album of 2014 in the UK. The album also peaked at number 19 on the Billboard 200 charts in the United States. Ezra released six singles from the album: "Did You Hear the Rain?", "Budapest", "Cassy O'", "Blame It on Me", "Listen to the Man" and "Barcelona". Zane Lowe, then a BBC Radio 1 DJ, called him "one of the most compelling and powerful new vocalists around."

Ezra released his first live EP "Live in London" on 24 December 2015 with five songs in the EP, "Barcelona", "Budapest", "Did You Hear the Rain", "Song 6" and a solo version of "Over the Creek".

Ezra's second studio album, Staying at Tamara's, which was released on 23 March 2018 by Columbia Records, reached number one in the UK and the top ten in seven other countries, including Australia. It was accompanied by five singles: "Don't Matter Now", "Paradise", "Shotgun", "Pretty Shining People" and "Hold My Girl". "Paradise" reached number two on the UK Singles Chart.

In June 2018, Ezra gained his first UK number-one single with "Shotgun".

In late 2021, Ezra released "Come on Home for Christmas" as an Amazon exclusive.

Ezra's third studio album Gold Rush Kid was released on 10 June 2022. Four singles from the album have been released: "Anyone for You (Tiger Lily)" in January 2022, "Green Green Grass" in April 2022, "Dance All Over Me" in September 2022 and "Sweetest Human Being Alive" in January 2023.

== Albums ==
Title	Details	Peak chart positions										Sales	Certifications
Title	Details	UK	AUS	AUT	BEL (FL)	GER	IRE	NL	NZ	SWI	US	Sales	Certifications
Wanted on Voyage	Released: 30 June 2014; Label: Columbia; Format: Digital download, CD, LP	1	4	9	13	8	5	9	4	6	19	UK: 1,499,571	BPI: 5× Platinum; ARIA: Platinum; BVMI: Gold; IFPI SWI: Gold; RIAA: Gold; RMNZ: 4× Platinum
Staying at Tamara's	Released: 23 March 2018; Label: Columbia; Format: Digital download, CD, LP	1	7	6	19	10	2	7	8	6	68	UK: 1,186,354	BPI: 4× Platinum; ARIA: Platinum; BVMI: Gold; RMNZ: 3× Platinum
Gold Rush Kid	Released: 10 June 2022; Label: Columbia; Format: CD, LP, digital download, streaming	1	10	9	6	12	3	5	14	6	— (Note: Gold Rush Kid did not enter the US Billboard 200 but did peak at number 82 on the US Album Sales chart.)		BPI: Gold; RMNZ: Gold

== Extended plays ==
Title	Details
Did You Hear the Rain?	Released: 25 October 2013; Label: Sony; Format: Digital download
Cassy O'	Released: 7 March 2014; Label: Sony; Format: Digital download
Live in London	Released: 24 December 2015; Format: Digital download

== Singles ==
Title	Year	Peak chart positions										Certifications	Album
Title	Year	UK	AUS	AUT	BEL (FL)	GER	IRE	NL	NZ	SWI	US	Certifications	Album
"Did You Hear the Rain?"	2013	—	—	72	—	—	89	—	—	—	—	BPI: Silver	Wanted on Voyage
"Budapest"	2013	3	5	1	7	3	4	4	1	7	32	BPI: 6× Platinum; ARIA: 9× Platinum; BRMA: Platinum; BVMI: Platinum; IFPI AUT: Gold; IFPI SWI: Platinum; NVPI: Gold; RIAA: 4× Platinum; RMNZ: 8× Platinum	Wanted on Voyage
"Cassy O'"	2014	70	—	—	— (Note: "Cassy O'" did not enter the Ultratop 50, but peaked at number three on the Flemish Ultratip chart.)	—	—	— (Note: "Cassy O'" did not enter the Netherlands' Single Top 100 but peaked on the Netherlands' Single Tip Chart at number 15.)	—	— (Note: "Cassy O'" did not enter the Swiss Singles chart, but charted at number 91 on the Swiss Airplay chart.)	—	BPI: Gold	Wanted on Voyage
"Blame It on Me"	2014	6	10	11	— (Note: "Blame It on Me'" did not enter the Ultratop 50, but peaked at number six on the Flemish Ultratip chart.)	27	17	— (Note: "Blame It on Me" did not enter the Netherlands' Single Top 100 but peaked on the Netherlands' Single Tip Chart at number four.)	8	16	—	BPI: 3× Platinum; ARIA: 2× Platinum; BVMI: Gold; RIAA: Gold; RMNZ: 2× Platinum	Wanted on Voyage
"Listen to the Man"	2014	41	—	—	— (Note: "Listen to the Man" did not enter the Ultratop 50, but peaked at number 10 on the Flemish Ultratip chart.)	—	83	—	—	— (Note: "Listen to the Man" did not enter the Swiss Singles chart, but charted at number 67 on the Swiss Airplay chart.)	—	BPI: Platinum; RMNZ: Gold	Wanted on Voyage
"Barcelona"	2015	—	—	—	— (Note: "Barcelona" did not enter the Ultratop 50, but peaked at number 12 on the Flemish Ultratip chart.)	—	—	—	—	— (Note: "Barcelona" did not enter the Swiss Singles chart, but charted at number 98 on the Swiss Airplay chart.)	—	BPI: Platinum; ARIA: Platinum; RIAA: Gold; RMNZ: Platinum	Wanted on Voyage
"Don't Matter Now"	2017	66	—	—	— (Note: "Don't Matter Now" did not enter the Ultratop 50, but peaked at number five on the Flemish Ultratip chart.)	—	—	— (Note: "Don't Matter Now" did not enter the Netherlands' Single Top 100 but peaked on the Netherlands' Single Tip Chart at number 22.)	—	— (Note: "Don't Matter Now" did not enter the Swiss Singles chart, but charted at number 13 on the Swiss Airplay chart.)	—	BPI: Gold	Staying at Tamara's
"Paradise"	2018	2	— (Note: "Paradise" did not enter the Australian ARIA Singles Chart but peaked at number 28 on the ARIA Digital Track Chart.)	2	— (Note: "Paradise" did not enter the Ultratop 50, but peaked at number seven on the Flemish Ultratip chart.)	24	5	—	—	38	—	BPI: 4× Platinum; ARIA: 2× Platinum; BVMI: Gold; IFPI AUT: Platinum; RMNZ: Platinum	Staying at Tamara's
"Shotgun"	2018	1	1	4	1	12	1	3	1	4	—	BPI: 8× Platinum; ARIA: 13× Platinum; BRMA: Platinum; BVMI: Platinum; IFPI AUT: 2× Platinum; IFPI SWI: 2× Platinum; NVPI: Platinum; RIAA: Platinum; RMNZ: 9× Platinum	Staying at Tamara's
"Hold My Girl"	2018	8	55	53	26	—	33	— (Note: "Hold My Girl" did not enter the Netherlands' Single Top 100 but peaked on the Netherlands' Single Tip Chart at number 25.)	—	— (Note: "Hold My Girl" did not enter the Swiss Singles chart, but charted at number 17 on the Swiss Airplay chart.)	—	BPI: 3× Platinum; ARIA: 3× Platinum; BVMI: Gold; IFPI AUT: Platinum; IFPI SWI: Gold; RMNZ: Platinum	Staying at Tamara's
"Pretty Shining People"	2019	25	—	—	15	—	40	— (Note: "Pretty Shining People" did not enter the Netherlands' Single Top 100 but peaked on the Netherlands' Single Tip Chart at number eight.)	— (Note: "Pretty Shining People" did not enter the NZ Top 40 Singles Chart, but peaked at number 15 on the NZ Hot Singles Chart.)	—	—	BPI: Platinum; RMNZ: Gold	Staying at Tamara's
"Come on Home for Christmas"	2021	8	—	—	21	100	—	—	—	—	—	BPI: Silver	Non-album single
"Anyone for You (Tiger Lily)"	2022	12	— (Note: "Anyone for You (Tiger Lily)" did not enter the Australian ARIA Singles Chart but peaked at number 21 on the ARIA Digital Track Chart.)	52	4	79	12	17	— (Note: "Anyone for You" did not enter the NZ Top 40 Singles Chart, but peaked at number nine on the NZ Hot Singles Chart.)	63	—	BPI: Platinum; IFPI AUT: Gold; IFPI SWI: Gold; RMNZ: Gold	Gold Rush Kid
"Green Green Grass"	2022	3	19	17	2	55	4	29	— (Note: "Green Green Grass" did not enter the NZ Top 40 Singles Chart, but peaked at number 32 on the NZ Hot Singles Chart.)	58	—	BPI: 3× Platinum; ARIA: 2× Platinum; BVMI: Gold; IFPI AUT: Platinum; IFPI SWI: Gold; RMNZ: Platinum	Gold Rush Kid
"Dance All Over Me"	2022	61	—	—	7	— (Note: "Dance All Over Me" did not enter the German Singles Chart, but peaked at number 39 on the Deutsche Download Singles Chart.)	—	—	—	— (Note: "Dance All Over Me" did not enter the Swiss Singles chart, but charted at number 65 on the Swiss Airplay chart.)	—	BPI: Silver	Gold Rush Kid
"Sweetest Human Being Alive"	2023	— (Note: "Sweetest Human Being Alive" did not enter the UK Singles Chart, but peaked at number 97 on the UK Singles Downloads Chart.)	—	—	—	—	—	—	—	—	—		Gold Rush Kid
"—" denotes a recording that did not chart or was not released in that territory.

=== Promotional singles ===
Title	Year	Peak chart positions	Album
Title	Year	NZ Hot	Album
"I Went Hunting"	2022	34	Gold Rush Kid

== Other charted and certified songs ==
Title	Year	Peak chart positions		Certifications	Album
Title	Year	UK	SCO	Certifications	Album
"Leaving It Up to You"	2014	95	86	BPI: Silver	Wanted on Voyage
"Get Away"	2018	—	—	BPI: Silver	Staying at Tamara's
"All My Love"	2018	—	—	BPI: Silver	Staying at Tamara's
"Sugarcoat"	2018	—	—	BPI: Silver	Staying at Tamara's
"Saviour" (featuring First Aid Kit)	2018	—	—	BPI: Silver	Staying at Tamara's
"The Beautiful Dream"	2018	—	—	BPI: Silver	Staying at Tamara's
"Only a Human"	2018	—	—	BPI: Silver	Staying at Tamara's
"—" denotes a recording that did not chart in that territory.

== Music videos ==
Title	Year	Director(s)	Ref.
"Did You Hear the Rain?"	2013	Ned Miles	
"Budapest"	2013	Rob Brandon	
"Cassy O'"	2014	Rob Brandon	
"Blame It on Me"	2014	Roger Guàrdia	
"Listen to the Man"	2014	Rob Brandon	
"Barcelona"	2015	Ben Reed	
"Leaving It Up to You"	2015		
"Don't Matter Now"	2017	Marc Oller	
"Paradise"	2018	Tim Mattia	
"Shotgun"	2018	Nelson De Castro, Carlos Lopez Estrada	
"Hold My Girl"	2018	Bison	
"Pretty Shining People"	2019	Michael Cumming	
"Come On Home for Christmas"	2021	Isaac Ravishankara	
"Anyone for You"	2022	Andrew Donoho	
"Green Green Grass"	2022	Isaac Ravishankara	
"Dance All Over Me"	2022	Charlie Sarsfield	
"Come On Home for Christmas" (Alternate video)	2022		
