= Glastonbury Festival 2019 =

British musical festival (26 to 30 June)

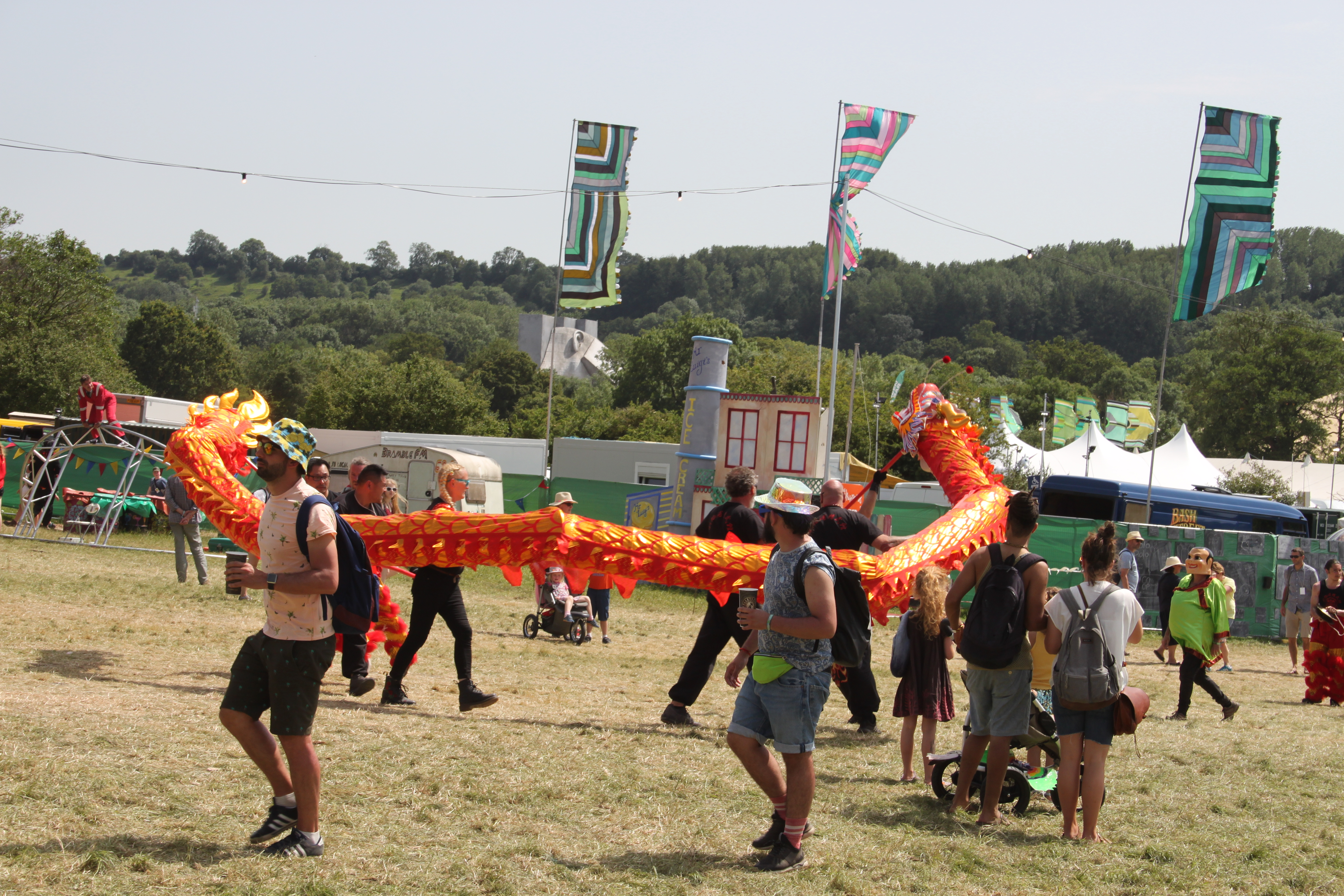
- Walkabout acts
- Date: 26 June 2019 – 30 June 2019
- Locations: Worthy Farm, Pilton, Somerset, England
- Previous event: Glastonbury Festival 2017
- Next event: Glastonbury Festival 2022
- Website: glastonburyfestivals.co.uk

The 2019 Glastonbury Festival of Contemporary Performing Arts took place between 26 and 30 June. The three headlining acts were Stormzy, the Killers, and The Cure.

This was the last regular edition until 2022 when the subsequent two editions were cancelled due to the COVID-19 pandemic, known as enforced "fallow" years.

Kylie Minogue's much anticipated performance in the Legends time slot became the most viewed Glastonbury performance in the festival’s history with 3.9 million viewers, marking the Australian's return to the festival after being forced to pull out in 2005 after being diagnosed with breast cancer. Partway through the Killers' set the stage was swept by Jimmy Carr.

== New areas ==
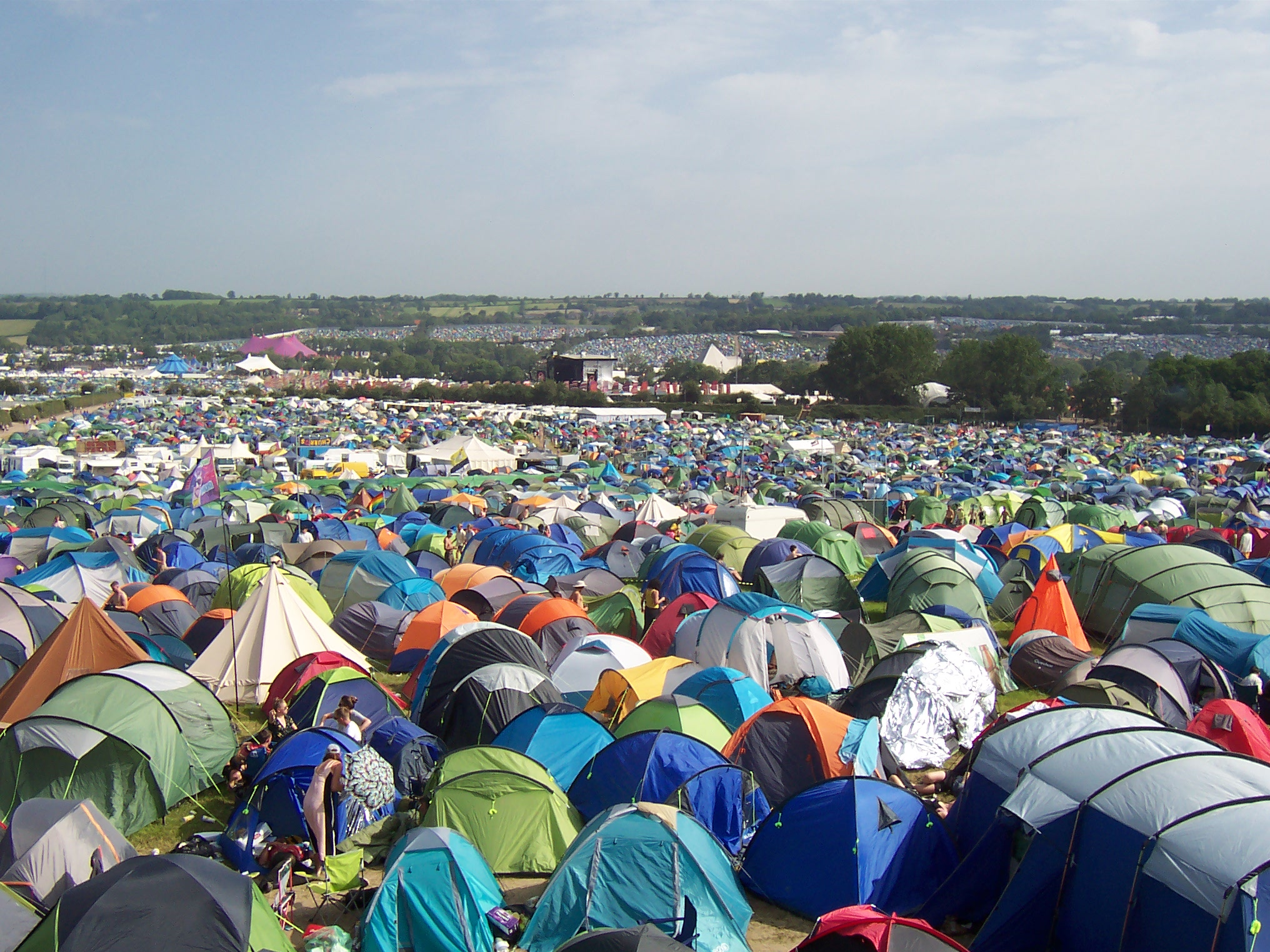
Pennard Hill Ground

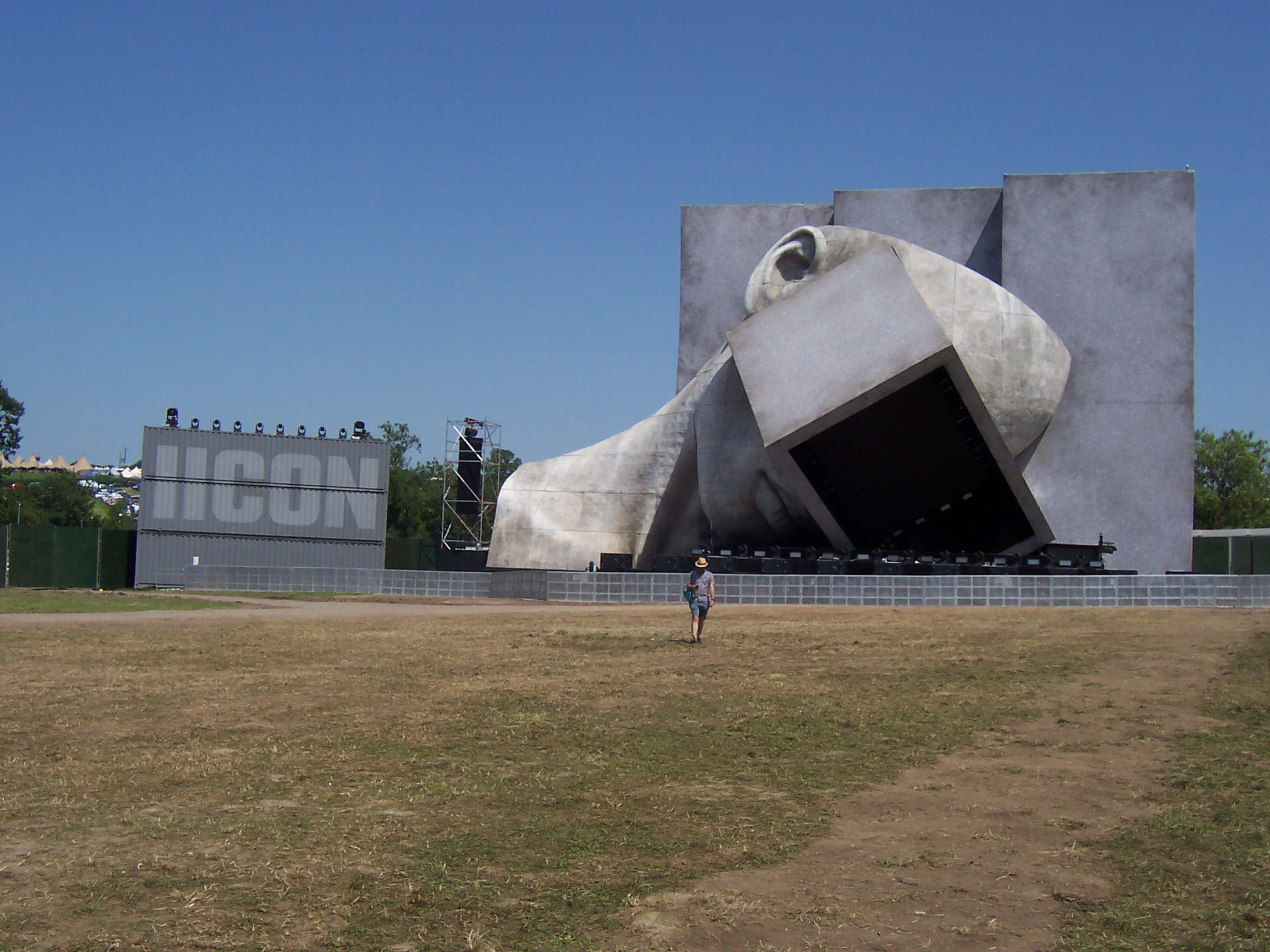
The new IICON venue

New areas developed for the 2019 festival included "Glastonbury-on-Sea" which included a metal seaside with amusements and animatronics. Block9 in the South East corner of the site was expanded with the inclusion of a new venue and installation, IICON, described as "a pseudo-religious monument to the terrifying new realities emerging in our digital, data-driven, post-truth age".

== 2019 FIFA Women's World Cup screening ==
Glastonbury Festival confirmed via their Twitter account that they would show the 2019 FIFA Women's World Cup quarter-final match between England and Norway on big screens at the West Holt's Stage, after a request from England Women's player Georgia Stanway whose brother would be at the festival and would have no other way of watching the match. Kick-off was at 8 pm BST on 27 June and England won the game 3–0.

== Tickets ==
General Admission tickets for the festival cost £248 for the full weekend and sold out.

Capacity was 203,000, with all 135,000 weekend sold in under 36 minutes.

== Weather ==
The weather was consistently dry and warm throughout the weekend, with temperatures rising throughout the week and peaking on the Saturday afternoon, before cooler conditions made their way in for Sunday. The festival was totally rain-free for the first time since 2010, and experienced the highest average temperatures for almost a decade.

== Line-up ==
The line-up was:

=== Pyramid Stage ===
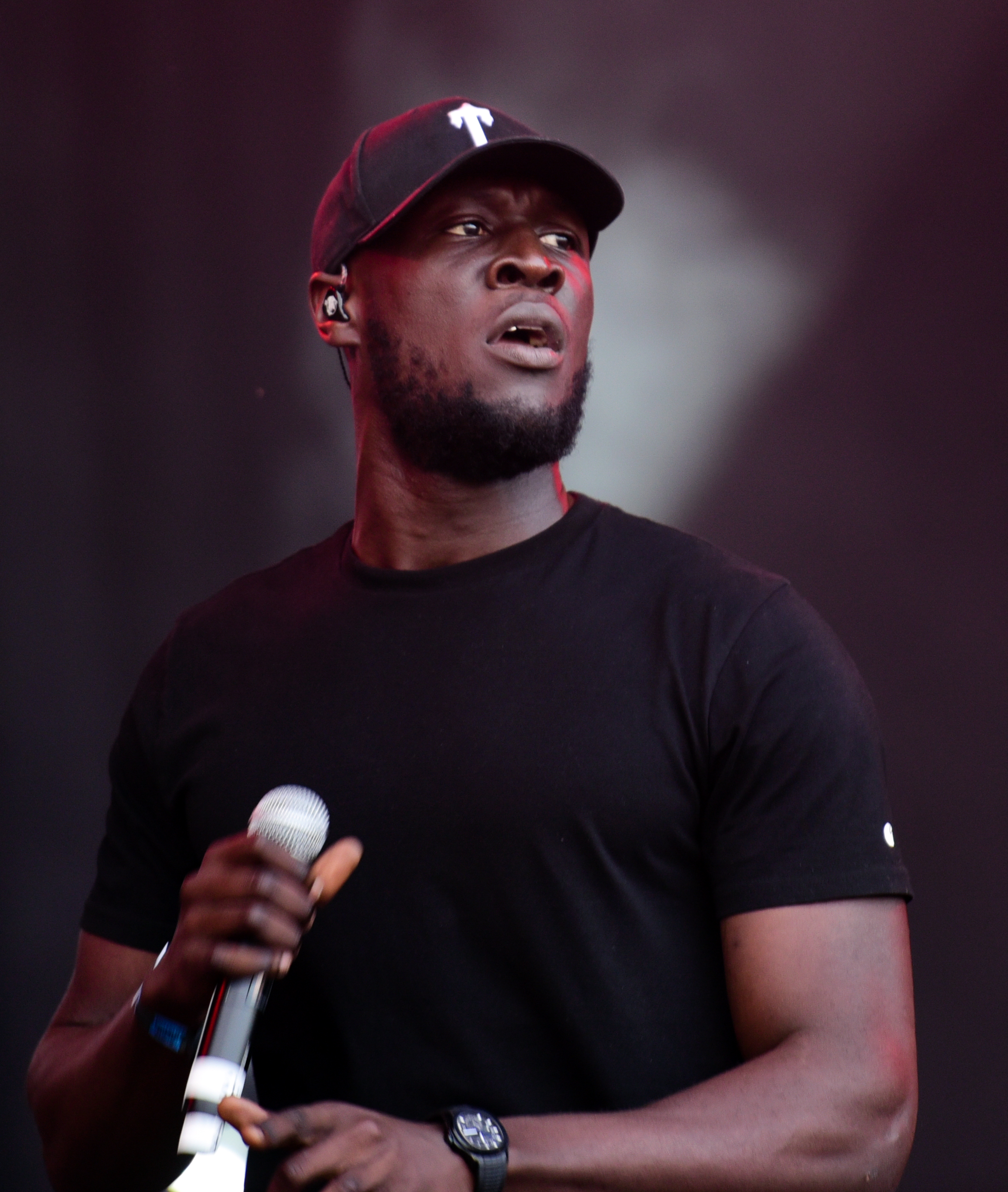
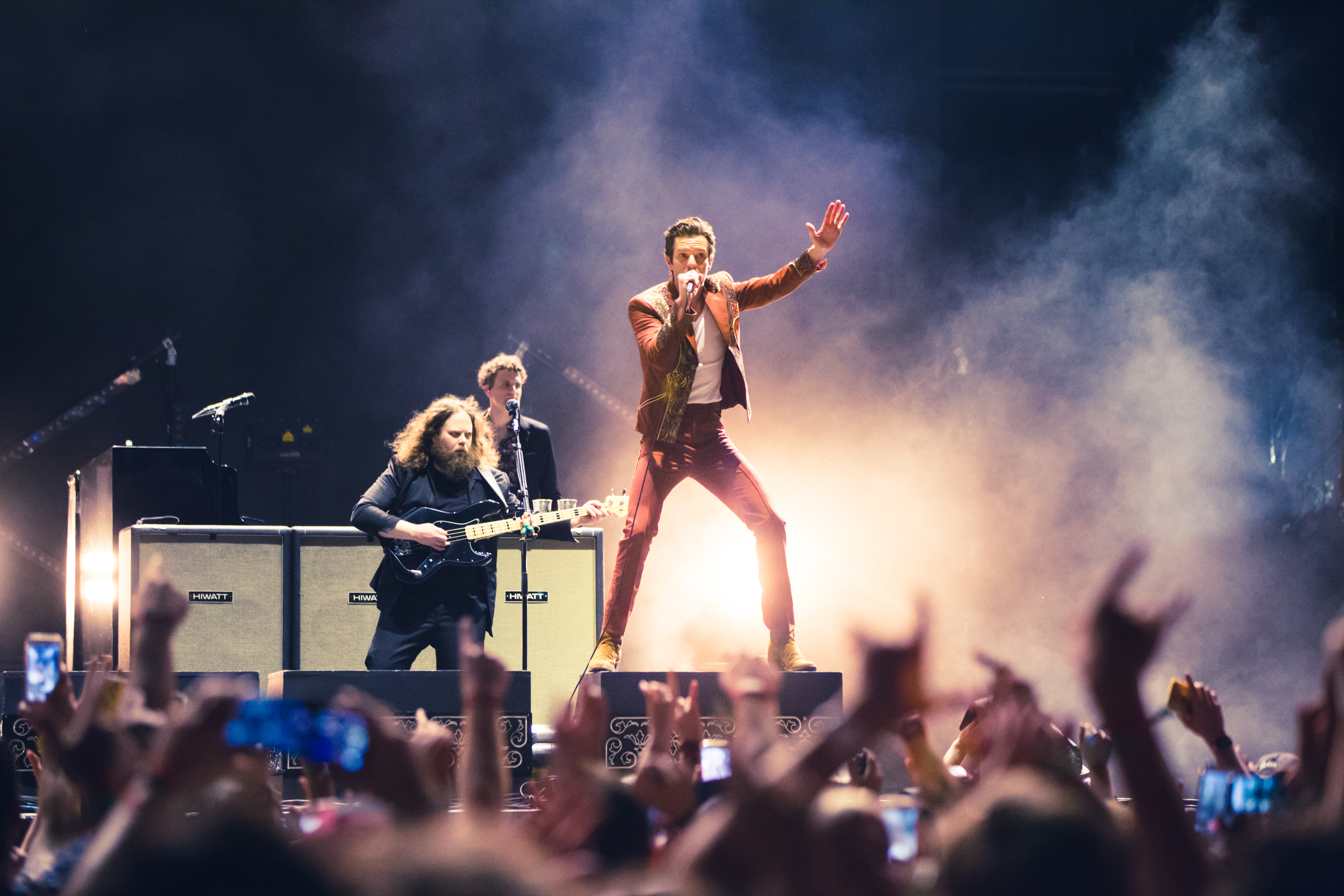
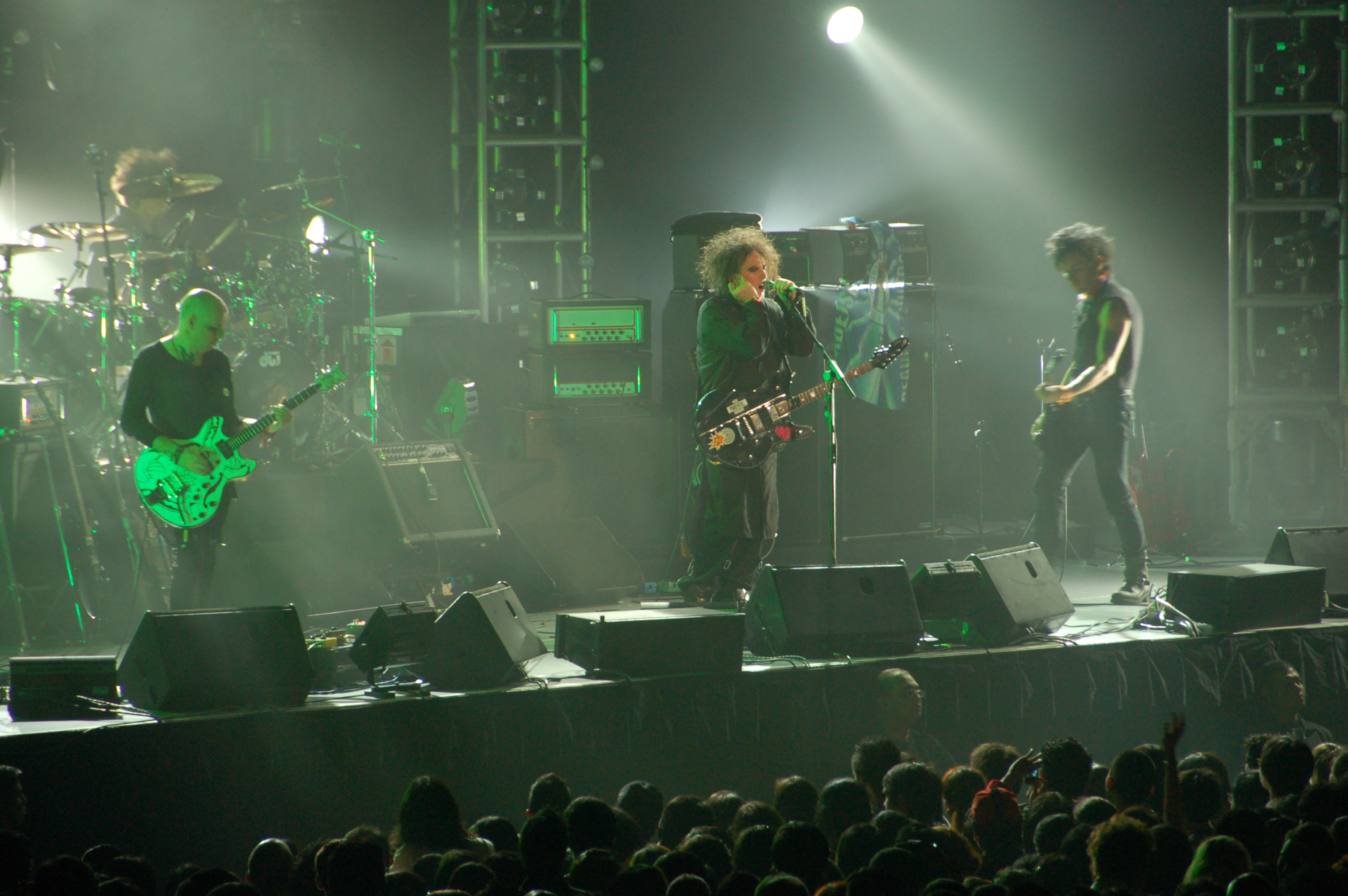
Pyramid Stage headliners Stormzy, The Killers and The Cure.

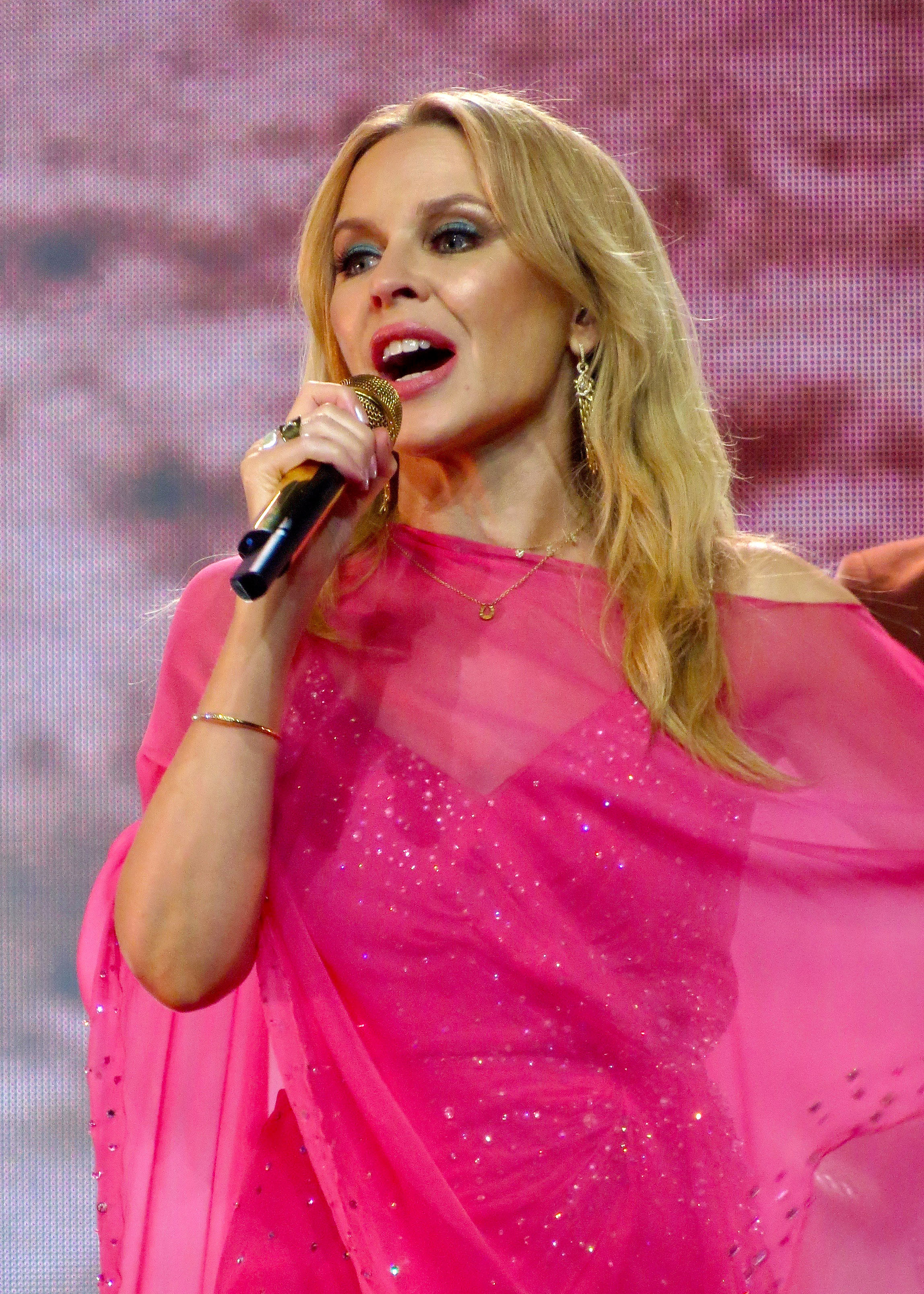
Kylie Minogue performed in the iconic Legends' slot.

Friday	Saturday	Sunday
Stormzy^{[B]} 22:15 - 23:45; George Ezra; 20:15 - 21:15; Lauryn Hill; 18:00 - 19:15; Bastille^{[A]} 16:15 - 17:15; Sheryl Crow; 14:30 - 15:30; Tom Odell; 13:15 - 14:00; Björn Again; 11:45 - 12:45	The Killers^{[C]} 21:45 - 23:45; Liam Gallagher; 19:15 - 20:30; Janet Jackson; 17:45 - 18:35; Hozier; 16:00 - 17:00; Anne-Marie; 14:40 - 15:30; Carrie Underwood; 13:15 - 14:15; The Proclaimers; 11:45 - 12:45	The Cure; 21:30 - 23:30; Vampire Weekend; 19:30 - 20:30; Miley Cyrus^{[E]} 17:45 - 18:45; Kylie Minogue^{[D]} 15:45 - 17:00; David Attenborough; 15:30 - 15:40; Years & Years; 13:45 - 14:45; Mavis Staples; 12:15 - 13:05; Langa Methodist Church Choir (from Cape Town, South Africa); 11:00 - 11:45

A. Bastille's set featured appearances by Rationale and Lewis Capaldi.
B. Stormzy's set featured appearances by Chris Martin, Dave and Fredo.
C. The Killers' set featured appearances by Pet Shop Boys and Johnny Marr.
D. Kylie Minogue's set featured appearances by Nick Cave and Chris Martin.
E. Miley Cyrus' set featured appearances by Mark Ronson, Billy Ray Cyrus and Lil Nas X.

Pyramid Stage Set Lists
Tom Odell
- 1. I Know
- 2. Sparrow
- 3. Still Getting Used to Being on My Own
- 4. Grow Old with Me
- 5. Can't Pretend
- 6. Hold Me
- 7. Son of an Only Child
- 8. Piano Man (Billy Joel cover)
- 9. Another Love
Sheryl Crow
- 1. If It Makes You Happy
- 2. A Change Would Do You Good
- 3. All I Wanna Do
- 4. My Favorite Mistake
- 5. Can't Cry Anymore
- 6. Prove You Wrong
- 7. Best of Times
- 8. Still the Good Old Days
- 9. Soak Up the Sun
- 10. Steve McQueen
- 11. Everyday Is a Winding Road
Bastille
- 1. Quarter Past Midnight
- 2. I Know You with Rationale
- 3. Send Them Off!
- 4. Two Evils
- 5. Happier
- 6. Things We Lost in the Fire
- 7. Those Nights
- 8. Doom Days
- 9. Blame
- 10. Joy with Lewis Capaldi
- 11. Good Grief
- 12. Of the Night
- 13. Million Pieces
- 14. Pompeii
Lauryn Hill
- 1. Lost Ones
- 2. Everything Is Everything
- 3. Superstar
- 4. Final Hour
- 5. Forgive Them Father
- 6. Ex-Factor
- 7. Can't Take My Eyes Off You (Frankie Valli cover)
- 8. To Zion
- 9. Doo Wop (That Thing)
- 10. Killing Me Softly with His Song
George Ezra
- 1. Don't Matter Now
- 2. Get Away
- 3. Barcelona
- 4. Pretty Shining People
- 5. Listen to the Man
- 6. Did You Hear the Rain?
- 7. Paradise
- 8. Hold My Girl
- 9. All My Love
- 10. Blame It on Me
- 11. Budapest
- 12. Cassy O'
- 13. Shotgun
Stormzy
- 1. Know Me From
- 2. Cold
- 3. First Things First
- 4. One Take
- 5. Mr Skeng
- 6. Don't Cry For Me
- 7. Cigarettes & Cush
- 8. Sweet like Chocolate (Shanks & Bigfoot cover)
- 9. Ultralight Beam (Kanye West cover)
- 10. Blinded by Your Grace, Pt. 1 with Chris Martin
- 11. Crown
- 12. Return of the Rucksack
- 13. Bad Boys
- 14. Shape of You (Ed Sheeran cover)
- 15. Funky Friday (Dave cover) with Dave and Fredo
- 16. Vossi Bop
- 17. Shut Up
- 18. Blinded by Your Grace, Pt. 2
- 19. Big for Your Boots
Carrie Underwood
- 1. Church Bells
- 2. Cowboy Casanova
- 3. Last Name
- 4. Wasted
- 5. Jesus, Take the Wheel
- 6. Flat on the Floor
- 7. Southbound
- 8. Just a Dream/Dream On (Aerosmith cover)
- 9. Love Wins
- 10. Two Black Cadillacs
- 11. Blown Away
- 12. Cry Pretty
- 13. Undo It
- 14. Smoke Break
- 15. Before He Cheats
Anne-Marie
- 1. Ciao Adios
- 2. Heavy
- 3. Perfect
- 4. Trigger
- 5. Can I Get Your Number
- 6. Don't Leave Me Alone
- 7. Alarm
- 8. Then
- 9. Rockabye
- 10. 2002
- 11. Friends
Hozier
- 1. Would That I
- 2. Dinner & Diatribes
- 3. Nina Cried Power
- 4. Someone New
- 5. Angel of Small Death and the Codeine Scene
- 6. Almost (Sweet Music)
- 7. From Eden
- 8. Work Song
- 9. To Be Alone
- 10. Jackie and Wilson
- 11. Moment's Silence (Common Tongue)
- 12. Movement
- 13. Take Me to Church
Janet Jackson
- 1. Trust a Try
- 2. If
- 3. What Have You Done for Me Lately
- 4. Control
- 5. Nasty
- 6. R&B Junkie
- 7. The Best Things in Life Are Free
- 8. All for You
- 9. Come On Get Up
- 10. Rock with U
- 11. Throb
- 12. That's the Way Love Goes
- 13. Made for Now
- 14. State of the World
- 15. The Knowledge
- 16. Miss You Much
- 17. Love Will Never Do (Without You)
- 18. Alright
- 19. Escapade
- 20. Black Cat
- 21.Rhythm Nation
Liam Gallagher
- 1. Rock 'n' Roll Star
- 2. Morning Glory
- 3. Wall of Glass
- 4. Greedy Soul
- 5. For What It's Worth
- 6. Shockwave
- 7. Columbia
- 8. Slide Away
- 9. Roll with It
- 10. Bold
- 11. Universal Gleam
- 12. The River
- 13. Cigarettes & Alcohol
- 14. Wonderwall
- 15. Supersonic
- 16. Champagne Supernova
The Killers
- 1. Jenny Was a Friend of Mine
- 2. Somebody Told Me
- 3. Spaceman
- 4. The Way It Was
- 5. Shot at the Night
- 6. The Man
- 7. Smile Like You Mean It
- 8. For Reasons Unknown
- 9. Bling (Confession of a King)
- 10. Glamorous Indie Rock & Roll
- 11. A Dustland Fairytale
- 12. Runaways
- 13. Read My Mind
- 14. All These Things That I've Done
- 15. When You Were Young
- 16. Always on My Mind (Willie Nelson cover) with Pet Shop Boys
- 17. Human with Pet Shop Boys
- 18. This Charming Man (The Smiths cover) with Johnny Marr
- 19. Mr Brightside with Johnny Marr
Mavis Staples
- 1. Stronger
- 2. Take Us Back
- 3. Can You Get to That (Funkadelic cover)
- 4. Build a Bridge
- 5. Change
- 6. Who Told You That
- 7. For What It's Worth (Buffalo Springfield cover)
- 8. We Get By
- 9. Touch a Hand, Make a Friend
- 10. No Time for Crying
Years & Years
- 1. Sanctify
- 2. Shine
- 3. Karma
- 4. Meteorite
- 5. Eyes Shut
- 6. Take Shelter
- 7. Desire
- 8. Palo Santo
- 9. Worship
- 10. If You're Over Me
- 11. All for You
- 12. Play
- 13. King
Kylie Minogue
- 1. Love at First Sight
- 2. I Should Be So Lucky
- 3. On a Night Like This
- 4. Je ne sais pas pourquoi
- 5. Hand on Your Heart
- 6. Where the Wild Roses Grow with Nick Cave
- 7. Slow
- 8. Confide in Me
- 9. Kids
- 10. Can't Get You Out of My Head with Chris Martin
- 11. Especially for You
- 12. Shocked
- 13. Step Back in Time
- 14. Better the Devil You Know
- 15. Locomotion
- 16. All the Lovers
- 17. Dancing
- 18. Spinning Around
Miley Cyrus
- 1. Nothing Breaks Like a Heart with Mark Ronson
- 2. Back to Black (Amy Winehouse cover) with Mark Ronson
- 3. Mother's Daughter
- 4. Unholy
- 5. D.R.E.A.M.
- 6. Cattitude
- 7. We Can't Stop
- 8. The Most
- 9. Party Up the Street
- 10. Malibu
- 11. Jolene (Dolly Parton cover)
- 12. Party in the U.S.A.
- 13. Old Town Road with Lil Nas X and Billy Ray Cyrus
- 14. Panini with Lil Nas X
- 15. On a Roll
- 16. Head Like a Hole (Nine Inch Nails cover)
- 17. Wrecking Ball
Vampire Weekend
- 1. Sympathy
- 2. Cape Cod Kwassa Kwassa
- 3. Unbelievers
- 4. This Life
- 5. White Sky
- 6. Horchata
- 7. New Dorp, New York (SBTRKT cover)
- 8. Harmony Hall
- 9. Diane Young
- 10. Cousins
- 11. A-Punk
- 12. Oxford Comma
- 13. Jerusalem, New York, Berlin
The Cure
- 1. Plainsong
- 2. Pictures of You
- 3. High
- 4. A Night Like This
- 5. Lovesong
- 6. Last Dance
- 7. Burn
- 8. Fascination Street
- 9. Never Enough
- 10. Push
- 11. In Between Days
- 12. Just Like Heaven
- 13. From the Edge of the Deep Green Sea
- 14. Play for Today
- 15. A Forest
- 16. Shake Dog Shake
- 17. Disintegration
- 18. Lullaby
- 19. The Caterpillar
- 20. The Walk
- 21. Friday I'm in Love
- 22. Close to Me
- 23. Why Can't I Be You?
- 24. Boys Don't Cry

=== Other Stage ===
Friday	Saturday	Sunday
Tame Impala; 22:15 - 23:45; Two Door Cinema Club; 20:15 - 21:15; The Charlatans; 18:30 - 19:30; The Lumineers; 17:00 - 18:00; Mac DeMarco; 15:30 - 16:30; The Wombats; 14:00 - 15:00; MØ; 12:30 - 13:30; The Vaccines; 11:00 - 12:00	The Chemical Brothers; 22:15 - 23:45; The Courteeners; 20:45 - 21:30; Sigrid; 19:00 - 20:00; Johnny Marr; 17:30 - 18:30; Lewis Capaldi; 16:00 - 17:00; Maggie Rogers; 14:30 - 15:30; Fantastic Negrito; 13:00 - 14:00; The Cat Empire; 11:30 - 12:30	Christine and the Queens; 22:00 - 23:15; Dave; 20:15 - 21:15; Billie Eilish; 18:45 - 19:45; Loyle Carner; 17:15 - 18:15; Bring Me the Horizon; 15:45 - 16:45; Babymetal; 14:35 - 15:15; Slaves; 13:00 - 14:00; Circa Waves; 11:50 - 12:30; SK Shlomo; 11:00 - 11:25

=== West Holts Stage ===
Friday	Saturday	Sunday
Jon Hopkins; 22:15 - 23:40; Jorja Smith; 20:30 - 21:30; Maribou State; 19:00 - 20:00; The Comet Is Coming; 17:30 - 18:30; Bantu Continua Uhuru Consciousness (BCUC); 16:00 - 17:00; Swindle; 14:30 - 15:30; Acid Mothers Temple; 13:00 - 14:00; The Mauskovic Dance Band; 11:30 - 12:30	Wu-Tang Clan; 22:15 - 23:45; Jungle; 20:30 - 21:30; Neneh Cherry; 19:00 - 20:00; Lizzo; 17:30 - 18:30; Slowthai; 16:15 - 17:00; Ezra Collective; 14:45 - 15:45; Grupo Magnetico; 13:15 - 14:15; The Turbans; 11:30 - 12:30	Janelle Monáe; 21:45 - 23:15; Kamasi Washington; 20:00 - 21:00; Roy Ayers; 18:30 - 19:30; Fatoumata Diawara; 17:00 - 18:00; This Is the Kit; 15:30 - 16:30; Jeff Goldblum & The Mildred Snitzer Orchestra; 14:00 - 15:00; Hollie Cook; 12:30 - 13:30; Kokoroka; 11:00 - 12:00

=== John Peel Stage ===
Friday	Saturday	Sunday
Interpol; 22:30 - 23:45; Pale Waves; 21:00 - 22:00; Aurora; 19:30 - 20:30; Rosalía; 18:00 - 19:00; Pond; 16:30 - 17:30; Goat Girl; 14:00 - 14:45; Mahalia Burkmar; 12:45 - 13:30; Pip Blom; 11:30 - 12:15	Sean Paul; 22:30 - 23:45; Bugzy Malone; 21:00 - 22:00; Sharon Van Etten; 19:30 - 20:30; Low; 18:00 - 19:00; Freya Ridings; 16:30 - 17:30; Shura; 15:15 - 16:00; Gerry Cinnamon; 14:00 - 14:45; She Drew the Gun; 12:45 - 13:30; Swimming Girls; 11:30 - 12:15	The Streets; 21:30 - 22:45; Friendly Fires; 20:00 - 21:00; Stefflon Don; 18:30 - 19:30; Tom Walker; 17:00 - 18:00; Dermot Kennedy; 15:30 - 16:30; Octavian; 14:00 - 15:00; Alma; 12:30 - 13:30; Eyre Llew; 11:15 - 12:00

=== Park Stage ===
Friday	Saturday	Sunday
Cat Power; 23:00 - 00:15; Michael Kiwanuka; 21:15 - 22:15; Idles; 19:45 - 20:45; SOAK; 18:15 - 19:15; King Princess; 16:45 - 17:45; Lukas Nelson & Promise of the Real; 15:15 - 16:15; Georgia; 14:00 - 14:45; Steam Down; 12:45 - 13:30; Lankum; 11:30 - 12:10	Hot Chip; 23:00 - 00:15; Kae Tempest; 21:15 - 22:15; Kurt Vile and the Violators; 19:45 - 20:45; Foals (surprise set); 18:15 - 19:15; Sons of Kemet; 16:45 - 17:45; The Love Unlimited Orchestra; 15:15 - 16:15; Mattiel; 14:00 - 14:45; Ama Lou; 12:45 - 13:30; Vampire Weekend (special guests); 11:25 - 12:10	Rex Orange County; 21:15 - 22:30; Little Simz; 19:45 - 20:45; The Good, the Bad & the Queen; 18:15 - 19:15; Fat White Family; 16:30 - 17:30; Palace; 15:00 - 16:00; Koffee; 14:00 - 14:30; Jessie Buckley; 12:45 - 13:30; Black Peaches; 11:30 - 12:15

=== Bimble Inn ===
Thursday	Friday	Saturday	Sunday
Miles Metric; Barbarella's Bang Bang; Undercover Hippy; Ten Foot Wizard; Age Of Glass; Bridges; Funke and the Two Tone Baby; Special Guest; Flamenco Thief	DJ No Substitute; Dat Brass; Too Many Ts; Danny Wav & Co; Sleaze; Tensheds; Dila and the Odd Beats; The Voodoo Tweed Cult of Your Mum; Tirion; Trevor Moss & Hannah-Lou	DJ Papadez; Stanton Warriors; Slamboree; Rum Buffalo; Extinction Rebellion; Cable Street Collective; The Leylines; Loonaloop; Lionstar; The Little Unsaid; Circles Diner; Chrissy Behind - Power Ballard Yoga DJ Set	DJ Jake Pike; John Fairhurst; Bimble DJs; Bare Jams; Bot; Old Baby Mackerel; Jake Morrell; Reverend Ike's Sunday Soul Service

=== WOW ===
Thursday	Friday	Saturday	Sunday
Paranoid London (Live); Prospa; Mella Dee; Hammer; Jayda G; Ross From Friends; Farai; Feel The Real; Mr Price	Four Tet; Craig Richards B2B Ben Ufo; Daniel Avery; Haai; Hodge; On Loop Takeover Moxie B2B Shanti Celeste - Palms Trax - Cc:Disco!	AJ Tracey; Ghetts; Headie One; Kenny Allstar; Lady Leshurr; Young T & Bugsey	S_As; Lone B2B Kettama; Leon Vynehall; Midland B2B Bruce; Inner City (Live); Peach
