= Listen to the Man =

Single by George Ezra

from the album Wanted on Voyage
- Released: 28 October 2014
- Recorded: 2013
- Genre: Folk; blues
- Length: 3:03
- Label: Columbia
- Songwriters: George Ezra; Joel Pott
- Producer: Cam Blackwood

George Ezra singles chronology
"Blame It on Me" (2014)	"Listen to the Man" (2014)	"Barcelona" (2015)

"Listen to the Man" is a song by English singer-songwriter George Ezra. It was released in the United Kingdom on 28 October 2014 through Columbia Records as the fifth single from his debut studio album Wanted on Voyage (2014). The song has peaked at number 41 on the UK Singles Chart.

The accompanying music video features actor Sir Ian McKellen, who lip syncs to the lyrics.

== Music video ==
The official music video was directed by Rob Brandon, who also did the videos for Ezra's previous singles "Budapest" and "Cassy O'". It was filmed over four days in Barcelona and features actor Sir Ian McKellen (who lip syncs to the lyrics). It was uploaded to YouTube on 28 October 2014. Ezra told FUSE TV, "When we're making a video, I just say a really vague thing that I want to happen. For this one, I just said 'I don't want to be singing the song', so that could be anything! Then you pitch it to directors and it's their job to make that interesting [...] I was in New York, actually, and [Brandon] rang me and said, 'How would you feel about having Ian McKellen in your video?' I said, 'Very funny, Rob, but you're going to have to ask him first', and he already had! And Ian had already said yes!"

The video begins with Ezra sitting on a park bench and McKellen comes in to upstage him. Midway through the video, the song cuts off and Ezra confronts McKellen, who says he is so excited to be a part of the video. He also calls Ezra "Geoff" instead of George and says he loves Ezra's song "Bucharest" (Ezra then corrects him and says it's actually "Budapest"). Ezra then continues the song, with McKellen continuing to lip sync, both agreeing not to upstage the other. The video has received over 102 million views as of August 2022.

== Charts and certifications ==
=== Charts ===
Chart (2014)	Peak position
Belgium (Ultratip Bubbling Under Flanders)	10
Belgium (Ultratip Bubbling Under Wallonia)	32
Ireland (IRMA)	83
Scotland Singles (Official Charts)	22
UK Singles (Official Charts)	41
UK Singles Downloads (Official Charts)	30

=== Certifications ===
Region	Certification	Certified units/sales
New Zealand (RMNZ)	Gold	15,000^{‡}
United Kingdom (BPI)	Platinum	600,000^{‡}
^{‡} Sales+streaming figures based on certification alone.

== Release history ==
Region	Date	Format	Label
United Kingdom	28 October 2014	Digital download	Columbia
