= Joel Pott =

British musician

Background information
- Born: 20 January 1979 (age 47); Spilsby, Lincolnshire, England
- Genres: Indie
- Instruments: Vocals, synthesizer, guitar, keyboard, bass guitar, piano, drums
- Years active: 1999–present
- Labels: Fiction, Parlophone, Astralwerks
- Formerly of: Athlete

Joel Laslett Pott (born 20 January 1979 in Spilsby, Lincolnshire, England) is an English musician. He was the lead vocalist and guitarist of the indie band Athlete between 2000 and their split in 2013. In recent years he has served as a songwriter and music producer for numerous artists.

== Biography ==
While a child, he was bought some drums by his parents. These ultimately "didn't work out" and he was then given a nylon string guitar at the age of six. In his teenage years, he listened to British bands such as Blur, Radiohead and Oasis. He has cited Blur guitarist Graham Coxon as an influence on his own playing of the instrument.

Pott went to Trinity school in Stalybridge, Greater Manchester and then to Hillcrest School in Bellingham, near Catford in London, later studying graphic design, photography and English for his A levels at the Brit School of Performing Arts and Technology.

He considered attending the University of Edinburgh, but decided to move to Deptford, London, where he formed Athlete with childhood friends Carey Willetts, Steve Roberts and Tim Wanstall in 1999. Pott appeared on the BBC panel gameshow Never Mind the Buzzcocks on 15 November 2007.

=== Athlete ===
Pott and his band Athlete - formed in 2000 - released four studio albums. These are Vehicles and Animals in 2003, which was nominated for a Mercury Music Prize award, Tourist in 2005, which reached number one in the UK Album Charts in its first week and included the band's highest charting song "Wires" at number four, Beyond the Neighbourhood in 2007 and the latest, Black Swan, in 2009.

Athlete have also released three EPs which are titled Athlete, The Outsiders EP and The Getaway. The band have also released two live albums which includes a live recording from the band's show at Union Chapel performing their main hits stripped back to acoustic and more mellow titled Live at Union Chapel. The band's other live release was a ten-year anniversary live version of their debut album Vehicles and Animals Live recorded during a tour across the country.

The band continued to play occasional dates and small festivals. Pott has more recently been working with artists including George Ezra and London Grammar in writing songs. Athlete have stated that at this moment they do not intend to create a new album, but have not ruled it out in the future.

== Personal life ==
Pott married in 2000. From the relationship he has three children including a daughter called Myla and a son named Ethan. Although now healthy, Myla was born prematurely and is the subject of the Athlete song "Wires". Pott also wrote "Black Swan Song" after his grandfather, who fought in World War II and died in 2005.

== Songwriting and production credits ==
Since 2011, Pott has co-written and produced tracks with a number of artists including George Ezra, London Grammar, James Bay, Gabrielle Aplin, Tom Walker and Shura. He was nominated for the 2015 Ivor Novello Awards as co-writer of the hit single "Budapest" by George Ezra.

Title	Year	Artist	Album	Songwriter	Producer
"Chances"	2010	Westlife	Gravity	check	
"Hit My Ego"	2011	Cicada	Sunburst	check	
"Sunburst"	2011	Cicada	Sunburst	check	
"Is This Love"	2012	Aiden Grimshaw	Misty Eye	check	
"As One"	2013	Hadouken	Every Weekend	check	
"Stop Time"	2013	Hadouken	Every Weekend	check	
"The Comedown"	2013	Hadouken	Every Weekend	check	
"Another Life"	2013	Bo Bruce	Before I Sleep	check	check
"Over & Over (Run With the Horses)"	2013	Bo Bruce	Before I Sleep	check	check
"Salvation"	2013	Gabrielle Aplin	English Rain	check	
"Broken is Beautiful"	2013	Jonas Myrin	Dreams Plan Everything	check	
"Shyer"	2013	London Grammar	If You Wait	check	
"Youth"	2013	Fenech-Soler	Rituals	check	
"Did You Hear the Rain?"	2013	George Ezra	Wanted on Voyage	check	
"Budapest"	2013	George Ezra	Wanted on Voyage	check	
"Just Once"	2014	Shura	Non-album single	check	check
"Touch"	2014	Shura	Nothing's Real	check	check
"Cassy O"	2014	George Ezra	Wanted on Voyage	check	
"Blame It on Me"	2014	George Ezra	Wanted on Voyage	check	
"Barcelona"	2014	George Ezra	Wanted on Voyage	check	
"Listen to the Man"	2014	George Ezra	Wanted on Voyage	check	
"Leaving It Up to You"	2014	George Ezra	Wanted on Voyage	check	
"Stand By Your Gun"	2014	George Ezra	Wanted on Voyage	check	
"Breakaway"	2014	George Ezra	Wanted on Voyage	check	
"Spectacular Rival"	2014	George Ezra	Wanted on Voyage	check	check
"Song 6"	2014	George Ezra	Wanted on Voyage	check	
"Da Vinci Riot Police"	2014	George Ezra	Wanted on Voyage	check	
"Blind Man in Amsterdam"	2014	George Ezra	Wanted on Voyage	check	check
"Indecision"	2014	Shura	Nothing's Real	check	check
"Kings & Queens"	2014	Brooke Fraser	Brutal Romantic	check	
"2Shy"	2015	Shura	Nothing's Real	check	check
"Need the Sun to Break"	2015	James Bay	Chaos and the Calm	check	
"Better Off Without You"	2015	Aquilo	Painting Pictures of a War EP	check	
"Wildstar" (ft. Foxes)	2015	Giorgio Moroder	Déjà Vu	check	
"Close Your Eyes"	2015	Rhodes	Wishes	check	
"White Light"	2015	Shura	Nothing's Real	check	check
"Know Me Better"	2015	Mabel	Non-album single	check	check
"Without Your Love"	2015	Charlene Soraia	Love Is the Law	check	
"My Boy My Town"	2015	Mabel	Non-album single	check	check
"Touch" (re-release ft. Talib Kweli)	2016	Shura	Non-album single	check	check
"What's It Gonna Be?"	2016	Shura	Nothing's Real	check	check
"The Space Tapes"	2016	Shura	Nothing's Real	check	
"Make It Up"	2016	Shura	Nothing's Real	check	check
"Thinking of You"	2016	Mabel	Non-album single	check	check
"(i)"	2016	Shura	Nothing's Real		check
"Nothing's Real"	2016	Shura	Nothing's Real	check	check
"Kidz 'n' Stuff"	2016	Shura	Nothing's Real		check
"What Happened to Us?"	2016	Shura	Nothing's Real	check	check
"(ii)"	2016	Shura	Nothing's Real	check	check
"Tongue Tied"	2016	Shura	Nothing's Real		check
"311215"	2016	Shura	Nothing's Real		check
"No Gold"	2016	Norma Jean Martine	Only in My Mind	check	check
"Hang My Hat"	2016	Norma Jean Martine	Only in My Mind		check
"Angels on My Shoulders"	2016	Norma Jean Martine	Only in My Mind	check	check
"Ride or Die"	2017	Mabel	Bedroom EP	check	
"Talk About Forever"	2017	Mabel	Bedroom EP	check	check
"Don't Matter Now"	2017	George Ezra	Staying at Tamara's	check	
"Begging"	2017	Mabel	Ivy to Roses	check	
"Come Over"	2017	Mabel	Ivy to Roses	check	check
"Low Key"	2017	Mabel	Ivy to Roses	check	check
"Get Away"	2018	George Ezra	Staying at Tamara's	check	
"Shotgun"	2018	George Ezra	Staying at Tamara's	check	
"All My Love"	2018	George Ezra	Staying at Tamara's	check	
"Sugarcoat"	2018	George Ezra	Staying at Tamara's	check	
"Hold My Girl"	2018	George Ezra	Staying at Tamara's	check	
"Saviour" (ft. First Aid Kit)	2018	George Ezra	Staying at Tamara's	check	
"Only a Human"	2018	George Ezra	Staying at Tamara's	check	
"The Beautiful Dream"	2018	George Ezra	Staying at Tamara's	check	
"17"	2018	Lily Moore	Not That Special EP	check	
"3AM"	2018	You Me at Six	VI	check	check
"Make 'Em Like You"	2018	Tom Grennan	Lighting Matches	check	check
"Little by Little Love"	2018	Tom Grennan	Lighting Matches	check	check
"Secret Lover"	2018	Tom Grennan	Lighting Matches	check	check
"Back Again"	2018	You Me at Six	VI	check	check
"All Day"	2018	Lily Moore	I Will Never Be EP	check	
"Pray for Me"	2018	You Me at Six	VI	check	check
"Candlelight"	2019	Jack Savoretti	Singing to Strangers	check	
"BKLYNLDN"	2019	Shura	Forevher	check	check
"Religion (U Can Lay Your Hands on Me)"	2019	Shura	Forevher	check	check
"The Stage"	2019	Shura	Forevher	check	check
"Something About You" (with Rudimental)	2019	Elderbrook	Why Do We Shake in the Cold?	check	
"That's Me, Just a Sweet Melody"	2019	Shura	Forevher		check
"Side Effects"	2019	Shura	Forevher	check	check
"Tommy"	2019	Shura	Forevher		check
"Princess Leia"	2019	Shura	Forevher	check	check
"Flyin'"	2019	Shura	Forevher	check	check
"Forever"	2019	Shura	Forevher	check	check
"Control"	2019	Shura	Forevher	check	check
"Skyline, Be Mine"	2019	Shura	Forevher	check	check
"Better Half of Me"	2019	Tom Walker	What a Time to Be Alive: Deluxe Edition	check	
"Elevator Girl" (ft. Ivy Sole)	2020	Shura	Non-album single		check
"Wait for You" (ft. Zoe Wees)	2020	Tom Walker	"I Am"	check	
"I'm a Fool"	2020	Elderbrook	Why Do We Shake in the Cold?	check	
"Feet Don't Fail Me Now"	2021	Joy Crookes	Skin	check	
"Too Much History"	2021	Jack Savoretti	Europiana	check	check
"Why Not"	2021	Jack Savoretti	Europiana	check	check
"Late Night"	2021	Jack Savoretti	Europiana	check	check
"Anyone for You (Tiger Lily)"	2022	George Ezra	Gold Rush Kid	check	check
"Green Green Grass"	2022	George Ezra	Gold Rush Kid	check	check
"Gold Rush Kid"	2022	George Ezra	Gold Rush Kid	check	check
"Manila"	2022	George Ezra	Gold Rush Kid	check	check
"Fell in Love at the End of the World"	2022	George Ezra	Gold Rush Kid		check
"Don't Give Up"	2022	George Ezra	Gold Rush Kid	check	check
"Dance All Over Me"	2022	George Ezra	Gold Rush Kid	check	check
"I Went Hunting"	2022	George Ezra	Gold Rush Kid	check	check
"In the Morning"	2022	George Ezra	Gold Rush Kid	check	check
"Sweetest Human Being Alive"	2022	George Ezra	Gold Rush Kid	check	check
"Love Somebody Else"	2022	George Ezra	Gold Rush Kid	check	check
"The Sun Went Down"	2022	George Ezra	Gold Rush Kid		check
"The Things We Say"	2024	Nieve Ella	Watch It Ache and Bleed	check	
"Teenage Love"	2024	Katie Gregson-MacLeod	Non-album single	check	
"See You Later"	2024	Matilda Mann	“Roxwell”	check	check
"I Know You'd Kill"	2024	Joy Crookes	“Juniper”	check	
"I Wanna Be Loved By You"	2024	Shura	"I Got Too Sad for My Friends"	check	check
"Bad Kid"	2024	Shura	"I Got Too Sad for My Friends"	check	
