= Barcelona (George Ezra song) =

Single by George Ezra

from the album Wanted on Voyage
- Released: 28 August 2015
- Genre: Folk rock
- Length: 3:08
- Label: Columbia
- Songwriters: George Ezra; Joel Pott
- Producer: Cam Blackwood

George Ezra singles chronology
"Listen to the Man" (2014)	"Barcelona" (2015)	"Don't Matter Now" (2017)

"Barcelona" is a song by English singer-songwriter George Ezra. It was released in the United Kingdom on 28 August 2015 through Columbia Records as the sixth and final single from his debut studio album Wanted on Voyage (2014).

== Music video ==
The official music video was directed by Ben Reid and uploaded to YouTube on 21 July 2015. The video has 18 million views as of April 2022.

== Charts ==
Chart (2015)	Peak position
Belgium (Ultratip Bubbling Under Flanders)	62

== Certifications ==
Region	Certification	Certified units/sales
Australia (ARIA)	Platinum	70,000^{‡}
Denmark (IFPI Danmark)	Gold	45,000^{‡}
New Zealand (RMNZ)	Platinum	30,000^{‡}
United Kingdom (BPI)	Platinum	600,000^{‡}
United States (RIAA)	Gold	500,000^{‡}
^{‡} Sales+streaming figures based on certification alone.

== Release history ==
Region	Date	Format	Label
United Kingdom	28 August 2015	Digital download	Columbia
