= Anyone for You (Tiger Lily) =

2022 single by George Ezra

- signed CD single cover

Single by George Ezra

from the album Gold Rush Kid
- Released: 28 January 2022
- Length: 3:07
- Label: Columbia; Sony
- Songwriter(s): George Ezra; Joel Pott
- Producer(s): Pott

George Ezra singles chronology
"Come on Home for Christmas" (2021)	"Anyone for You (Tiger Lily)" (2022)	"Green Green Grass" (2022)

"Anyone for You (Tiger Lily)" is a song by British singer-songwriter George Ezra, released as the first single from Ezra's third studio album Gold Rush Kid on 28 January 2022. It debuted at number 32 on the UK Singles Chart on 4 February and rose to number 30 the following week, eventually peaking at number 12.

== Background and release ==
"Anyone for You" tells the story of Tiger Lily, a 21-year-old girl who just moved to the city. Ezra sings as the protagonist of the song, who tells Tiger Lily that he can be anyone for her and will help her as her romantic partner. The song also discusses what seems to be a breakup between the two main subjects and the protagonist's hope that Tiger Lily won't forget him.

"Anyone for You (Tiger Lily)" was released on 28 January 2022.

== Charts ==
=== Weekly charts ===
Chart performance for "Anyone for You (Tiger Lily)"
Chart (2022)	Peak position
Austria (Ö3 Austria Top 40)	52
Belgium (Ultratop 50 Flanders)	4
Belgium (Ultratop 50 Wallonia)	10
Croatia (HRT)	3
Czech Republic (Rádio – Top 100)	29
France Airplay (SNEP)	51
Germany (GfK)	79
Hungary (Rádiós Top 40)	29
Hungary (Single Top 40)	36
Iceland (Tónlistinn)	33
Ireland (IRMA)	12
Netherlands (Dutch Top 40)	5
Netherlands (Single Top 100)	17
New Zealand Hot Singles (RMNZ)	9
Poland (Polish Airplay Top 100)	8
San Marino (SMRRTV Top 50)	24
Slovakia (Rádio Top 100)	5
Suriname (Nationale Top 40)	1
Switzerland (Schweizer Hitparade)	63
UK Singles (OCC)	12

=== Year-end charts ===
2022 year-end chart performance for "Anyone for You"
Chart (2022)	Position
Belgium (Ultratop 50 Flanders)	31
Belgium (Ultratop 50 Wallonia)	75
Netherlands (Dutch Top 40)	17
Netherlands (Single Top 100)	61
Poland (ZPAV)	70
UK Singles (OCC)	54

== Certifications ==
Certifications for "Anyone for You (Tiger Lily)"
Region	Certification	Certified units/sales
Austria (IFPI Austria)	Gold	15,000^{‡}
Denmark (IFPI Danmark)	Gold	45,000^{‡}
New Zealand (RMNZ)	Gold	15,000^{‡}
South Africa (RISA)	Gold	10,000^{‡}
Switzerland (IFPI Switzerland)	Gold	10,000^{‡}
United Kingdom (BPI)	Platinum	600,000^{‡}
^{‡} Sales+streaming figures based on certification alone.

== Release history ==
Release history and formats for "Anyone for You (Tiger Lily)"
Region	Date	Format	Label	Version	Ref.
Various	28 January 2022	Digital download; streaming	Columbia; Sony	Original	
Italy	28 January 2022	Contemporary hit radio	Sony	Original	
Various	25 February 2022	Digital download; streaming	Columbia; Sony	Nathan Dawe Remix	
United Kingdom	4 March 2022	CD single	Columbia; Sony	Original; instrumental	
