= The Leylines =

British folk rock band

- The Leylines at G Live, Guildford

Background information
- Origin: Weston-super-Mare, Somerset, England
- Genres: Folk rock, indie rock, folk punk
- Years active: 2013-present
- Members: Steve Mitchell - lead vocals, acoustic guitar; Hannah McLeod (née Johns) - violin, backing vocals; Dave Burbidge - drums; Dan Thompson - electric guitar; Sean Booth - bass guitar, backing vocals
- Past members: James Dyer - drums; Peter Fealey - bass guitar; Matthew Wilkins - acoustic guitar, backing vocals; Ben Higgs - electric guitar, backing vocals
- Website: theleylinesmusic.co.uk

The Leylines are a folk rock band formed in Weston-super-Mare, Somerset in 2013. The band's violin and guitar driven sound has seen them headline multiple tours across the UK, as well as performing at world renowned festivals, such as Glastonbury Festival, Farmer Phil's Festival, Boomtown Fair and Bearded Theory. To date, The Leylines have released two full studio albums and one EP. In 2019 the band achieved a career highlight of playing to thousands of fans on the Big Top stage at Beautiful Days.

== Early Years: 2013-14 ==
"The name of the band means energy...it means electricity, and when we go into a venue...we feel that energy" - Steve Mitchell

The Leylines were formed in 2013 when founding members Steve Mitchell, formerly of British rock band Evanfly, along with Matthew Wilkins, of the band The Moderations, went to record a series of demos for a new festival band they wanted to form, of which the band The Levellers were a strong influence. They recorded a few tracks at Sawmills Studios with Tony Hobden & Weston College. Upon listening through the tracks the duo decided to enlist Hannah McLeod (née Johns), a local session violinist, into the band. With the trio formed, they also recruited bassist Peter Fealey and drummer James Dyer.

The band's first full band show was in October 2013, supporting 3 Daft Monkeys at Gloucester Guild Hall. On 20 December 2013 the band released the Let It Go E.P., featuring four songs, including the eponymous track Let It Go produced by Tony Hobden in Weston-super-Mare.

Following the release of their first E.P. the band began playing music festivals, such as Watchet Festival, Lakefest, Sat in a Field Festival and Something Else in the Dean Festival, where they built a grassroots fanbase. The band also supported Skinny Lister on their Five Cities Tour in October 2014.

In late 2014, James Dyer made the decision to leave the band to head to university. Following a relatively short period without a drummer, the band announced the recruitment of Bristol-based Dave Burbidge on 9 December 2014.

== First Album & Tours: 2015-16 ==
In 2015 the band released their first single, Sat in a Field to raise money for four charities; Myeloma UK, The Nikita Jade Fund, Somewhere House Somerset and the Children's Hospice South West. The same year the band played Lakefest Festival, and one review commented:

"The Leylines never fail to impress and once again their driving take on bawdy folk rock left the audience baying for more, having paid witness to an invigorating set by a band built for the biggest of festival stages."

The band headed to Brighton, UK to record Along The Old Straight Track in February 2016 (see below).

The Leylines' first full UK headlining tour began in February 2017, it was called the "Along The Old Straight Track Tour". The tour included 19 dates across the UK.

== Line-Up Changes & Second Album: 2017-20 ==
During the summer of 2017, the band made their first appearance at Glastonbury Festival, playing four shows at The Bread & Roses bar, Bimble Inn and Toad Hall stages. That same summer, the band made the decision to change up their sound with the inclusion of an electric guitarist, and they chose to recruit their occasional sound engineer, Dan Thompson. Around the same time, bassist Peter Fealey decided to leave the band to focus on his family. Sean Booth was drafted in to replace Peter Fealey and made his debut with the band, a trial by fire, at their first appearance at Beautiful Days Festival 2017 at the Bimble Inn stage.

In March 2018, the band embarked on a pilgrimage to Cornwall, UK to record their second album, Recover Reveal (see below).

Summer 2019 was one of the biggest festival seasons yet for the band, with slots at Glastonbury Festival on the Avalon Cafe Stage and The Big Top at Beautiful Days Festival being amongst the multitude of festivals & events they played.

As part of the Fly Away Tour in Spring 2020, the band were due to travel to The Netherlands, and support the Levellers on their 2020 tour but had to postpone their tour due to the COVID-19 pandemic. They would go on to support the Levellers on their "Levelling The Land 30th Anniversary Tour 2021" in Margate, Guildford and Norwich.

On Saturday 19 September 2020, the band played their only full band live-stream at White Noise Studio in Weston-super-Mare. Subsequently, they went on to release a CD of the audio from the live-stream entitled "The Leylines Live From White Noise Studio".

In February 2024, Dan Thompson took a hiatus from the band, leading to the band acquiring the services of Ben Higgs on Lead Guitar. Ben would work with the band throughout their Spring & Autumn Tours, as well as festivals during the summer. In late January 2025 it was announced that Ben would be leaving the band, and a few weeks later it was announced that Dan Thompson would re-join.

== Third Album "Phosphenes": 2025 ==
In March 2025 it was announced that the band's third studio album, "Phosphenes" would be released in the summer of 2025.

"Phosphenes" was produced and recorded by Joe Marsh at Orchard Recording Studios in Somerset in several sessions between January 2024 – April 2025. The album is an evolution of the band's sound, which include experimental concepts as well as the tried and true methods that fans are accustomed to.

Artwork for the album was designed in collaboration with artist Loretta Sandy, as the band wanted an artistic human touch to the look of the album, to reflect the evolution & maturity of the music.

== Breakup ==
On 8 December 2025 the band took to social media to announce to their fans that 2026 would be their last year. In their announcement they cited founding member, Steve Mitchell's, desire to relocate abroad, and their overall desire to try new avenues, as a deciding factor.

Their final public show was held at the sold out Chapel Arts Centre, in Bath, on Saturday 11 April 2026.

== Music ==
=== Along the Old Straight Track (2016) ===
Recorded at Metway Studios, Brighton, UK in February 2016, Along the Old Straight Track is the band's debut studio album.

It was produced by Sean Lakeman and mixed & mastered by Al Scott.

The album received praise from Louder Than War:

"If you buy just one album this year there are eleven excellent reasons as to why it should be The Leylines Along The Old Straight Track. Quite simply you should buy this album." In fact the album was reviewed positively by multiple sources

The album title is derived from the book, "The Old Straight Track" by Alfred Watkins, in which the book explores the use of Ley lines across the UK.

=== Recover Reveal (2019) ===
Recorded at Cube Studio, Truro, Cornwall, UK over two weeks in March 2018, Recover Reveal is the band's second studio album. It was produced by Al Scott, who also mixed & mastered the album.

During the two weeks, the band lived together in a house in Tregullow, Redruth, close to the recording studio.

The album was released on 1 March 2019 and was well received, with airplay on BBC Cambridgeshire (The Folk Show), BBC Gloucestershire (Johnny Coppin) and BBC Shropshire (Genevieve Tudor's Sunday Folk). Reviews for the album were also very positive

"Long-time favourites on the festival scene, The Leylines bring a raucous energy to everything they do. Their sophomore effort is a great representation of their blistering, bighearted folk performed with reckless abandon." - The Musician Magazine

=== Phosphenes (2025) ===
Recorded at Orchard Recording Studios in Somerset, UK over several sessions from January 2024 to April 2025, Phosphenes is the band's third studio album. It was produced by Joe Marsh, who also mixed & mastered the album.

The album was released on 31 August 2025 and was well received.

== Band Members ==
=== Final ===
- Steve Mitchell - lead vocals, acoustic guitar (2013–2026)
- Hannah McLeod (née Johns) - violin, mandolin, piano, backing vocals (2013–2026)
- Dave Burbidge - drums (2015–2026)
- Sean Booth - bass guitar, backing vocals (2017–2026)
- Dan Thompson - electric guitar, backing vocals (2017–2024, 2025–2026)

=== Former ===
- James Dyer - drums (2013–2015)
- Peter Fealey - bass guitar (2013–2017)
- Matthew Wilkins - acoustic guitar, backing vocals (2013–2018)
- Ben Higgs - electric guitar (2024)

== Discography ==
=== Albums ===
- Along the Old Straight Track (2016)
- Recover Reveal (2019)
- Live From White Noise Studio (2020)
- Phosphenes (2025)

=== EPs ===
- Let It Go EP (2013)

== Videography ==
- "Sat In A Field" (2015) - Dir. Tony Hobden
- "Let It Go" (2016) - Dir. Katy Smith
- "Run For Cover" (Live in Weston-super-Mare, 2017) - Dir. Katy Smith
- "Sorry My Friends" (2018) - Dir. Nick McLeod
- "Broken And Alone" (2019) - Dir. Rob Ellis
- "This Is Your Life" (2019) - Dir. Nick McLeod
- "Fly Away" (Live at Carnglaze Caverns, 2019) - Dir. Nick McLeod
- "Long Way From Home" (Live at InCider Festival, 2020) - Dir. Nick McLeod
- "Things I Know" (Live From White Noise Studio, 2020) - Dir. Phil Horler
- "Control" (2021) - Dir. Rob Ellis
- 'Long Drop Summer" (2025) - Dir. Nick McLeod
