= Gold Rush Kid =

Studio album by George Ezra
- Released: 10 June 2022
- Length: 38:46
- Label: Columbia
- Producer: Barney Lister; Daniel Moyler; Joel Pott; Stuart Price

George Ezra chronology
Staying at Tamara's (2018)	Gold Rush Kid (2022)

Singles from Gold Rush Kid
- 1. "Anyone for You (Tiger Lily)" Released: 28 January 2022; 2. "Green Green Grass" Released: 22 April 2022; 3. "Dance All Over Me" Released: 30 September 2022; 4. "Sweetest Human Being Alive" Released: 20 January 2023

Professional ratings
Aggregate scores
Source	Rating
AnyDecentMusic?	6.3/10
Metacritic	72/100
Review scores
Source	Rating
DIY	3.5/5 stars
Gigwise	7/10 stars
The Guardian	3/5 stars
NME	3/5 stars

Gold Rush Kid is the third studio album by English singer-songwriter George Ezra, released on 10 June 2022 by Columbia Records. The album was promoted by five singles: "Anyone for You (Tiger Lily)", "Green Green Grass", "Dance All Over Me" and "Sweetest Human Being Alive". "I Went Hunting" was released as a promotional single. It became his third consecutive number-one album in the UK.

To promote the album, Ezra embarked on the Gold Rush Kid Tour, which commenced in London on 17th July, 2022.

== Track listing ==
All songs written by George Ezra and Joel Pott, except where noted; all tracks produced by Joel Pott, except where noted.

Gold Rush Kid track listing
No.	Title	Writer(s)	Producer(s)	Length
1.	"Anyone for You (Tiger Lily)"			3:08
2.	"Green Green Grass"	Ezra; Pott; Stuart Price	Pott; Price	2:47
3.	"Gold Rush Kid"			2:42
4.	"Manila"		Pott; Barney Lister	3:04
5.	"Fell in Love at the End of the World"	Ezra		3:17
6.	"Don't Give Up"		Pott; Daniel Moyler	3:05
7.	"Dance All Over Me"			3:14
8.	"I Went Hunting"			3:45
9.	"In the Morning"	Ezra		4:17
10.	"Sweetest Human Being Alive"			3:45
11.	"Love Somebody Else"			3:28
12.	"The Sun Went Down"	Ezra		2:14
Total length:				38:46

== Personnel ==
Musicians

- George Ezra – lead vocals (all tracks); background vocals, guitar (1–9, 11, 12)
- Joel Pott – background vocals, guitar, keyboards (1–9, 11, 12); programming (1, 3–7, 11, 12), synthesizer (1–9, 11, 12), bass (2–7, 10, 12), piano (2, 3, 7, 8, 11, 12), percussion (3, 4, 12), drums (8)
- Jimmy Sims – bass (all tracks), background vocals (1–6, 9, 11), percussion (3)
- Dan Grech-Marguerat – programming
- Fabio De Oliveira – background vocals (1–6, 9, 11), drums (1–7, 11), percussion (1–9)
- Lily Carassik – background vocals (1–4, 9), brass (1, 3, 4)
- Yasmin Ogilvie – background vocals (1–4, 9), brass (1, 3, 4)
- Daniel Moyler – background vocals (1–4, 6, 11); guitar, keyboards, programming, synthesizer (6)
- Mzansi Youth Choir – background vocals (1)
- Jim Hunt – brass (1, 3, 4), performance arrangement (1, 3), saxophone (5)
- Matthew Benson – brass (1, 3, 4), background vocals (9)
- Nikolaj Torp Larsen – keyboards, synthesizer (1–7, 11); piano (1, 2, 4–12), bass (2), background vocals (6)
- Adam Scarborough – background vocals (2, 11)
- Evie Howard – background vocals (2, 5)
- Freddie Lawrence – background vocals (2)
- Jessica Barnett – background vocals (2, 5, 9, 11)
- Myla Pott – background vocals (2, 5)
- Stuart Price – bass, guitar, keyboards, synthesizer (2)
- The Dap Kings – brass, performance arrangement (2)
- Cochemea Gastelum – saxophone (2)
- Ian Hendrickson-Smith – saxophone (2)
- Dave Guy – trumpet (2)
- Barney Lister – programming (4, 7, 11); bass, keyboards, synthesizer (4)
- Hal Ritson – drums, programming (4)
- Richard Adlam – drums, programming (4)
- David Klinke – guitar (4, 8)
- Tobie Tripp – conductor, performance arrangement (5, 7, 8, 10, 11)
- Ian Burdge – cello (5, 7, 8, 10, 11)
- Marianne Haynes – violin (5, 7, 8, 10, 11)
- Max Baillie – violin (5, 7, 8, 10, 11)
- Bruce White – viola (7, 8, 10)
- Ian Mizen – whistles (7)
- Bryony Elizabeth Moody – cello (8, 11)
- Chris Worsey – cello (8, 11)
- Andrew Parker – viola (8, 11)
- Kate Musker – viola (8, 11)
- Ian Humphries – violin (8, 11)
- Kate Robinson – violin (8, 11)
- Nicky Sweeney – violin (8, 11)
- Nirupam Raja Halder – violin (8, 11)
- Oli Langford – violin (8, 11)
- Tamara Elias – violin (8, 11)

Technical

- Matt Colton – mastering
- Charles Haydon-Hicks – mixing
- Dan Grech-Marguerat – mixing
- Luke Burgoyne – mixing (1, 3–12)
- Daniel Moyler – engineering
- Andy Maxwell – engineering (5), engineering assistance (8)
- Jonny Breakwell – engineering assistance
- Joe Wyatt – engineering assistance (5, 8)
- Tristan Ellis – engineering assistance (6, 8, 11)
- Ben Loveland – engineering assistance (7)
- Connor Panayi – engineering assistance (7, 10)
- Felipe Gutierrez – engineering assistance (7)

== Charts ==
=== Weekly charts ===
Weekly chart performance for Gold Rush Kid
Chart (2022)	Peak position
Australian Albums (ARIA)	10
Austrian Albums (Ö3 Austria)	9
Belgian Albums (Ultratop Flanders)	6
Belgian Albums (Ultratop Wallonia)	61
Czech Albums (ČNS IFPI)	59
Dutch Albums (Album Top 100)	5
German Albums (Offizielle Top 100)	12
Irish Albums (IRMA)	3
New Zealand Albums (RMNZ)	14
Polish Albums (ZPAV)	26
Scottish Albums (Official Charts)	1
Swedish Albums (Sverigetopplistan)	43
Swiss Albums (Schweizer Hitparade)	6
UK Albums (Official Charts)	1

=== Year-end charts ===
Year-end chart performance for Gold Rush Kid
Chart (2022)	Position
UK Albums (OCC)	18

== Certifications ==
Certifications for Gold Rush Kid
Region	Certification	Certified units/sales
Denmark (IFPI Danmark)	Gold	10,000^{‡}
New Zealand (RMNZ)	Gold	7,500^{‡}
Poland (ZPAV)	Gold	10,000^{‡}
United Kingdom (BPI)	Gold	100,000^{‡}
^{‡} Sales+streaming figures based on certification alone.

== See also ==
- List of UK Albums Chart number ones of 2022
