= Blame It on Me (George Ezra song) =

Single by George Ezra

from the album Wanted on Voyage
- Released: 11 August 2014
- Recorded: 2013
- Genre: Folk; blues; rock
- Length: 3:15
- Label: Columbia
- Songwriters: George Ezra; Joel Pott
- Producer: Cam Blackwood

George Ezra singles chronology
"Cassy O'" (2014)	"Blame It on Me" (2014)	"Listen to the Man" (2014)

"Blame It on Me" is a song by British singer-songwriter George Ezra. It was released as the fourth single from his debut studio album, Wanted on Voyage (2014). The song was released in the United Kingdom as a digital download on 11 August 2014 through Columbia Records. It debuted at number 6 on the UK Singles Chart, marking Ezra's second consecutive top 10 hit.

== Background ==
Ezra explained the song to InStyle. "I wrote it when I was 18 and had just moved to Bristol. I was saddled with student loans, and I realised there were so many opportunities to play music, so unless I got busy, I could only blame myself."

== Music video ==
An official lyric video to accompany the release of "Blame It on Me" was issued on 20 June 2014, with Ezra holding an old-fashioned TV with the lyrics appearing on it; at the same time, he is sitting on the seat of a dunk tank while several tennis balls are thrown towards it from off-screen. At the end of the bridge, a ball hits the button and Ezra falls into the water. He then holds the TV above his head for a while, whilst his face is barely visible. As the song ends, tennis balls are thrown towards the TV, which finally falls out of Ezra's hands and into the water. The video then ends with him laughing.

The official music video was directed by Rob Brandon and was filmed in the Bellvitge area of L'Hospitalet de Llobregat near Barcelona and in the Poblenou district of the Catalan capital. It was first released onto YouTube on 12 August 2014 at a total length of three minutes and forty-four seconds. The video begins with a Ford pickup full of criminals driving past Ezra, who is carrying his guitar in its case, and a Japanese man. The man asks Ezra in Japanese "Are you sure you want to follow the yellow brick road?" and then walks away without Ezra giving a response. The rest of the video features Ezra having a very bad day, including his guitar case blowing open and the instrument falling out into the road before being run over by a police car; getting tackled by a rugby team; hit with a sucker dart fired from a toy pistol by a child, defecated on by a bird and winding up in the middle of a gunfight between police officers and the aforementioned criminals. The video has over 74 million views as of October 2026.

== Track listing ==
Digital download
No.	Title	Length
1.	"Blame It on Me"	3:15

CD single
No.	Title	Length
1.	"Blame It on Me"	3:20
2.	"Get Lonely With Me"	3:05

== Charts ==
=== Weekly charts ===
Chart (2014–2015)	Peak position
Australia (ARIA)	10
Austria (Ö3 Austria Top 40)	11
Czech Republic Airplay (ČNS IFPI)	2
Belgium (Ultratip Bubbling Under Flanders)	6
Belgium (Ultratip Bubbling Under Wallonia)	21
Germany (GfK)	27
Hungary (Stream Top 40)	30
Iceland (RÚV)	2
Ireland (IRMA)	17
New Zealand (Recorded Music NZ)	8
Scottish Singles Sales (Official Charts)	5
Slovenia (SloTop50)	2
South Africa Airplay (EMA)	6
Switzerland (Schweizer Hitparade)	16
UK Singles (Official Charts)	6
US Adult Alternative Airplay (Billboard)	2
US Alternative Airplay (Billboard)	34
US Hot Rock & Alternative Songs (Billboard)	23
US Rock & Alternative Airplay (Billboard)	32

=== Year-end charts ===
Chart (2014)	Position
Slovenia (SloTop50)	3
UK Singles (Official Charts Company)	38

Chart (2015)	Position
US Adult Alternative Songs (Billboard)	1
US Hot Rock Songs (Billboard)	70

Chart (2016)	Position
Slovenia (SloTop50)	47

== Certifications ==
Region	Certification	Certified units/sales
Australia (ARIA)	2× Platinum	140,000^{‡}
Denmark (IFPI Danmark)	Gold	45,000^{‡}
Germany (BVMI)	Gold	200,000^{‡}
New Zealand (RMNZ)	2× Platinum	60,000^{‡}
United Kingdom (BPI)	3× Platinum	1,800,000^{‡}
United States (RIAA)	Gold	500,000^{‡}
^{*} Sales figures based on certification alone.^{‡} Sales+streaming figures based on certification alone.

== Release history ==
Region	Date	Format	Label
United Kingdom	11 August 2014	Digital download	Columbia
Germany	28 November 2014	CD single	Columbia
