= Don't Matter Now =

Single by George Ezra

from the album Staying at Tamara's
- Released: 16 June 2017
- Length: 2:57
- Label: Sony
- Songwriters: George Ezra; Joel Pott
- Producer: Cam Blackwood

George Ezra singles chronology
"Barcelona" (2015)	"Don't Matter Now" (2017)	"Paradise" (2018)

Music video
- "Don't Matter Now" on YouTube

"Don't Matter Now" is a song by English singer-songwriter George Ezra. The song was written by Joel Pott and George Ezra, with production handled by Charles Hicks, Cam Blackwood and Joel Davies. It was released to digital retailers on 16 June 2017, and later it was the lead single from Ezra's second studio album Staying at Tamara's (2018).

== Background ==
On 12 June 2017, Ezra announced the song's release date through a tweet, along with a video teaser. On 15 June 2017, the song premiered on Annie Mac's Radio 1 show.

When asked by NME about when the song was written, Ezra said: "I actually wrote the song at the tail end of 2015. I tell crowds at gigs that I wrote this song when the biggest thing we had to worry about was whether David Cameron had a sleepover with a pig. That gets a little chuckle. But it's true – those were the headlines. And in the last 18 months, the song has made more sense to me."

Talking about the song's background, he said: "I wrote 'Don't Matter Now' to remind myself, primarily, that it's okay to want to take yourself away from situations from time to time," said Ezra. "It was one of the first new songs I wrote after 'Wanted On Voyage', all the way back in sunny 2015. Events from back then can seem quite trivial at this point, but the song has made more sense to me as time has gone on. In time I realised that it wasn't just me that was suffering from anxiety, it wasn't just me that was confused, and that there's no harm in not always understanding what's going on in the world around you."

== Music video ==
A music video was released alongside the single. Shot in Barcelona, it was produced by Canada and directed by Marc Oller. Ezra can be seen going on a road trip with a dog, it also revealed Ezra's life with anxiety. Ezra said: "The dog had a bloody agent! The dog was getting more care than I was. And on the second day of filming, it bared its teeth at me! That put me on edge. I'm still learning when it comes to music videos. But I wanted this to express a feeling, which I think it does." The video has over 13 million views as of November 2022.

== Live performances ==
On 7 June 2017, Ezra performed five new songs in Bath on his "Top Secret" tour, with "Don't Matter Now" being one of them. On 21 June, Ezra performed the song on The One Show, then again three days later at Glastonbury Festival 2017.

== Critical reception ==
Andrew Trendell of NME regarded the song as an "anthemic showcase of Ezra's songcraftsmanship" and the "cathartic ode to being honest about how you're really feeling". Gabriel Aikins of Substream Magazine wrote that the song "combines Ezra's trademark acoustic guitar with horns on a track about letting go of the things that don't matter to more fully enjoy life". Kirstie Sutherland of Redbrick wrote: 'Don't Matter Now' is typical George – happy-go-lucky, care-free and just really bloody lovely." Heather Carrick of The National Student wrote: "George's famously low vocals blend seamlessly into the mid-tempo melody, backed up by an old timey trumpet-infused backing track creating a chilled-out, seaside-inspired song."

== Credits and personnel ==
Credits adapted from Tidal.

- George Ezra – composer, lyrics, vocals, guitar, percussion, synthesizer
- Joel Pott – composer, lyrics
- Charles Hicks – mixer
- Cam Blackwood – producer, engineer, vocals, guitar, organ, programming, synthesizer
- Joel Davies – mixer
- Dan Grech-Marguerat – mixing engineer, programming
- Dave Kutch – mastering engineer
- Liam Thorne – engineer, vocals, programming, synthesizer
- Florrie Arnold – vocals
- Billie Marten – vocals
- The Atlantic Horns – brass
- Matthew Racher – drums, percussion, programming

== Charts ==
Chart (2017)	Peak position
Belgium (Ultratip Bubbling Under Flanders)	5
Belgium (Ultratip Bubbling Under Wallonia)	12
Iceland (RÚV)	19
Netherlands (Single Tip)	23
Slovakia (Rádio Top 100)	42
Slovenia (SloTop50)	33
UK Singles (OCC)	66
US Rock & Alternative Airplay (Billboard)	43

== Certifications ==
Region	Certification	Certified units/sales
United Kingdom (BPI)	Gold	400,000^{‡}
^{‡} Sales+streaming figures based on certification alone.
