= Wanted on Voyage =

- Standard edition cover. The deluxe edition cover features a similar, close-up photograph of Ezra.

Studio album by George Ezra
- Released: 30 June 2014
- Recorded: 2013–2014
- Studios: Voltaire Road Studios, Clapham, London
- Genres: Pop rock; folk rock; Americana; blues
- Length: 43:30
- Labels: Columbia; Sony
- Producers: Cam Blackwood; Joel Pott

George Ezra chronology
| Wanted on Voyage (2014) | Staying at Tamara's (2018) |

Singles from Wanted on Voyage
- 1. "Did You Hear the Rain?" Released: 1 November 2013; 2. "Budapest" Released: 13 December 2013; 3. "Cassy O'" Released: 7 March 2014; 4. "Blame It on Me" Released: 11 August 2014; 5. "Listen to the Man" Released: 28 October 2014; 6. "Barcelona" Released: 28 August 2015

Wanted on Voyage is the debut studio album by British singer-songwriter George Ezra. It was released through Columbia Records on 30 June 2014 in the United Kingdom and on 27 January 2015 in the United States. It was produced by Cam Blackwood at Voltaire Road Studios, Clapham, London and mixed by Cenzo Townsend at Decoy Studios, Suffolk. The album includes the singles "Did You Hear the Rain?", "Budapest", "Cassy O'", "Blame It on Me", "Listen to the Man" and "Barcelona". The album was inspired by a trip Ezra took around Europe in May and June 2013.

The album received positive reviews from music critics. It debuted at number 3 on the UK Albums Chart, before climbing to number 1 in October 2014, four months after its release. It spent a total of four weeks at number one and was the third best-selling album of 2014 in the UK.

== Background ==
Ezra started out by uploading videos to YouTube of himself performing self-penned songs, before catching the attention of Columbia Records in 2012, when he was 18. He then proceeded signed a record deal with Columbia and released his debut EP Did You Hear the Rain? in November 2013. Ezra's EP was inspired by a trip around Europe in mid-2013. He told American Songwriter, "For my EP and album, I took a train journey around Europe for a month. I was just writing down everything I was seeing and all the people I was meeting. When I got home, I took the words I had written and made songs out of them. I've got some friends who say, 'I'm going to sit down and write 3 songs today,' and then they sit down and write 3 songs. I can't do that. I can't just write a song. I needed to take that trip and it helped a lot." Wanted on Voyage was recorded between early November 2013 and mid January 2014 at producer Cam Blackwood's Voltaire Road Studios in Clapham, South London.

The album's title is a reference to the sticker used on the suitcase of Paddington Bear, who was Ezra's hero when he was a child. In an interview with the London Evening Standard, he said, "I thought it sounded good. I looked into it and it turns out that back in the day if you were travelling overseas by boat, you would write 'wanted on voyage' on your hand luggage, and that was what you wanted with you for the journey, while everything went on cargo. I wrote most of the album while I was travelling around Europe so it just became the obvious title."

== Singles ==
"Did You Hear the Rain?" was released as the lead single from the album on 11 April 2014. The song peaked to number 72 in Austria. "Budapest" was released as the second single from the album on 13 June 2014. The song peaked at number 3 on the UK Singles Chart and reached number one in Austria and New Zealand. It was a top ten hit in Australia, Belgium, Germany, Ireland, the Netherlands, Switzerland and Lebanon. "Cassy O'" was released as the third single from the album on 13 June 2014. "Blame It on Me" was released as the fourth single from the album on 11 August 2014, reaching number 6 to become Ezra's second UK top-10 hit. "Listen to the Man" was released as the fifth single on 28 October 2014. "Barcelona" was released as the sixth single on 28 August 2015 with the video premiering on 21 July 2015.

== Critical reception ==
Professional ratings
Review scores
| Source | Rating |
|---|---|
| AllMusic | 4/5 stars |
| The Daily Telegraph | 4/5 stars |
| DIY | 4/5 stars |
| Gigslutz | 4/5 stars |
| musicOMH | 4/5 stars |
| Newsday | A− |
| The Observer | 3/5 stars |
| Renowned for Sound | 4/5 stars |
| Rolling Stone | 3.5/5 stars |
| PopMatters | 3.5/5 stars |

The album received positive reviews from music critics. Neil McCormick of The Daily Telegraph gave Wanted on Voyage a positive review, stating "Playing guitar, bass and keyboards, Ezra delivers structurally simple songs with enormous gusto, suggesting an uncynical, joyous release in the very act of making music. Producer Cameron Blackwood was once a member of the touring line-up of Alabama 3 and has clearly learnt a few tricks about updating old grooves. Ezra’s fluid vocals shift up the register to a trembling falsetto, adding a very contemporary sensitivity to a musical cocktail that wouldn’t have sounded out of place in a Greenwich folk club in the Sixties. From the giddy skiffle of "Cassy O’" to the sweet strum of "Barcelona" and rocky grit of "Did You Hear the Rain?", Ezra's debut has charm to spare."

Kitty Empire of The Observer wrote: "...the chief pleasure on these tunes is that Ezra has found a slightly less well-worn way to skin the cat of romantic competition. Requiring menace from an album that references the label on Paddington's suitcase is probably asking a bit much. But it's this darkish side that keeps you listening past the blithe singalongs." Timothy Monger of AllMusic stated that the album's mix of "scrappy romps" and "quirky, synth-laden indie pop tunes" offer up "enough diversity to keep things interesting."

== Commercial performance ==
On 2 July 2014, Wanted on Voyage was at number 3 on The Official Chart Update in the UK. On 3 July, the album entered the Irish Albums Chart at number 11. On 6 July, the album entered the UK Albums Chart at number 3. The album has also charted in Australia, Austria, Belgium, Denmark, Germany, Ireland, Netherlands, New Zealand and Switzerland.

On 5 October 2014, the album climbed to number one on the UK Albums Chart. By the end of 2014, Wanted on Voyage had sold 678,156 copies in the UK, making it the third best-selling album of the year. On 4 January 2015, the album reclaimed the number one spot in the UK. By April 2015, the album had sold 964,000 copies in the UK, and on 9 June, it was announced to have reached sales of over one million. As of March 2018, Wanted on Voyage has sold over 1.24 million copies in the UK.

== Track listing ==
All tracks are written by George Ezra and Joel Pott, except where noted. All songs produced by Cam Blackwood; additional production on "Spectacular Rival" by Pott.

| No. | Title | Length |
|---|---|---|
| 1. | "Blame It on Me" | 3:15 |
| 2. | "Budapest" | 3:20 |
| 3. | "Cassy O'" (writers: Ezra, Pott, Blackwood) | 3:04 |
| 4. | "Barcelona" | 3:08 |
| 5. | "Listen to the Man" | 3:03 |
| 6. | "Leaving It Up to You" | 3:36 |
| 7. | "Did You Hear the Rain?" (writers: Ezra, Matt Allchin) | 4:20 |
| 8. | "Drawing Board" (writers: Ezra, Allchin) | 3:46 |
| 9. | "Stand by Your Gun" | 3:04 |
| 10. | "Breakaway" | 4:44 |
| 11. | "Over the Creek" (writer: Ezra) | 3:56 |
| 12. | "Spectacular Rival" (producers: Blackwood, Pott) | 4:14 |
| Total length: | | 43:30 |

Deluxe edition
| No. | Title | Length |
|---|---|---|
| 13. | "Song 6" | 4:16 |
| 14. | "It's Just My Skin" (writers: Ezra, Allchin) | 4:04 |
| 15. | "Da Vinci Riot Police" | 3:42 |
| 16. | "Blind Man in Amsterdam" | 1:47 |
| Total length: | | 57:19 |

== Personnel ==
Musicians

- George Ezra – vocals, guitar (all tracks); keyboards (1–9, 11, 13, 15), percussion (3), bass (9, 10, 15)
- Cam Blackwood – bass (1–7, 11–13), guitar (1–13, 15), organ (1, 2, 4–8), programming (1–15), keyboards (3, 9–13, 15), percussion (3, 10), background vocals (10, 13)
- Matthew Racher – drums, percussion (1, 3, 6, 8–12, 15)
- Joel Pott – guitar (3, 12), background vocals (10), keyboards (12), programming (12)
- Liam Thorne – percussion (3, 5, 8, 9, 11, 15), programming (3)
- Chris McComish – drums, percussion (4–7, 13); background vocals (10)
- Lorna Blackwood – background vocals (5, 10), vocals (15)
- Ethan Barnett – background vocals (10)
- Jessica Barnett – background vocals (10)
- Joe Etchells – background vocals (10)
- Tom Tyler – background vocals (10)
- Will Hunt – background vocals (10)
- Ben Mark – guitar (14)

Technical

- Mazen Murad – mastering
- Cenzo Townshend – mixing (1–15)
- Joel Pott – mixing (16)
- Cam Blackwood – engineering
- Liam Thorne – engineering (1, 2, 4–16), engineering assistance (3)
- Lorna Blackwood – vocal production
- Sean Julliard – engineering assistance (1, 2, 4–16)

Artwork

- Alex Cowper – art direction, design
- Pip – photography

== Charts ==
=== Weekly charts ===
| Chart (2014–15) | Peak position |
|---|---|
| Australian Albums (ARIA) | 4 |
| Austrian Albums (Ö3 Austria) | 9 |
| Belgian Albums (Ultratop Flanders) | 13 |
| Belgian Albums (Ultratop Wallonia) | 30 |
| Canadian Albums (Billboard) | 19 |
| Danish Albums (Hitlisten) | 19 |
| Dutch Albums (Album Top 100) | 9 |
| French Albums (SNEP) | 6 |
| German Albums (Offizielle Top 100) | 8 |
| Irish Albums (IRMA) | 5 |
| Italian Albums (FIMI) | 12 |
| New Zealand Albums (RMNZ) | 4 |
| Scottish Albums (Official Charts) | 1 |
| South African Albums (RISA) | 10 |
| Swedish Albums (Sverigetopplistan) | 39 |
| Swiss Albums (Schweizer Hitparade) | 6 |
| UK Albums (Official Charts) | 1 |
| US Billboard 200 | 19 |
| US Americana/Folk Albums (Billboard) | 1 |
| US Top Rock Albums (Billboard) | 6 |

| Chart (2025) | Peak position |
|---|---|
| Greek Albums (IFPI) | 77 |

=== Year-end charts ===
| Chart (2014) | Position |
|---|---|
| Australian Albums (ARIA) | 48 |
| Belgian Albums (Ultratop Flanders) | 80 |
| Belgian Albums (Ultratop Wallonia) | 166 |
| French Albums (SNEP) | 105 |
| New Zealand Albums (RMNZ) | 34 |
| Swiss Albums (Schweizer Hitparade) | 51 |
| UK Albums (OCC) | 3 |
| Chart (2015) | Position |
| Australian Albums (ARIA) | 41 |
| Belgian Albums (Ultratop Flanders) | 122 |
| French Albums (SNEP) | 197 |
| Irish Albums (IRMA) | 19 |
| New Zealand Albums (RMNZ) | 16 |
| Swiss Albums (Schweizer Hitparade) | 70 |
| UK Albums (OCC) | 10 |
| US Billboard 200 | 103 |
| US Folk Albums (Billboard) | 5 |
| US Top Rock Albums (Billboard) | 30 |
| Chart (2018) | Position |
| UK Albums (OCC) | 46 |
| Chart (2019) | Position |
| UK Albums (OCC) | 89 |

=== Decade-end charts ===
| Chart (2010–2019) | Position |
|---|---|
| UK Albums (OCC) | 18 |

== Certifications ==
Certifications for Wanted on Voyage
| Region | Certification | Certified units/sales |
|---|---|---|
| Australia (ARIA) | Platinum | 70,000^{^} |
| Canada (Music Canada) | Platinum | 80,000^{‡} |
| Denmark (IFPI Danmark) | 2× Platinum | 40,000^{‡} |
| France (SNEP) | Gold | 50,000^{*} |
| Germany (BVMI) | Gold | 100,000^{‡} |
| Italy (FIMI) | Gold | 25,000^{‡} |
| New Zealand (RMNZ) | 4× Platinum | 60,000^{‡} |
| Poland (ZPAV) | Gold | 10,000^{‡} |
| Switzerland (IFPI Switzerland) | Gold | 10,000^{^} |
| United Kingdom (BPI) | 5× Platinum | 1,500,000 |
| United States (RIAA) | Gold | 500,000^{‡} |
^{*} Sales figures based on certification alone.^{^} Shipments figures based on certification alone.^{‡} Sales+streaming figures based on certification alone.

== Release history ==
| Region | Date | Format | Label | Ref. |
|---|---|---|---|---|
| United Kingdom | 30 June 2014 | CD; digital download | Columbia; Sony | |
| United States | 27 January 2015 | CD; digital download | Columbia; Sony | |
