= Budapest (song) =

Single by George Ezra

from the album Wanted on Voyage
- B-side: "Angry Hill"
- Released: 13 December 2013
- Recorded: 2013
- Genre: Folk rock
- Length: 3:21
- Label: Sony; Columbia
- Songwriters: George Ezra; Joel Pott
- Producer: Cam Blackwood

George Ezra singles chronology
"Did You Hear the Rain?" (2013)	"Budapest" (2013)	"Cassy O'" (2014)

Alternate cover

"Budapest" is a song by English singer-songwriter George Ezra, from his debut studio album, Wanted on Voyage (2014). It was released as the album's second single on 13 December 2013 in Italy, and on 13 June 2014 in the United Kingdom. The song was co-written by Ezra with Joel Pott and produced by Cam Blackwood.

The single was released on Columbia Records, and distributed by Sony Music, and peaked at number three on the UK Singles Chart. "Budapest" has also been a major hit for Ezra in Austria, New Zealand, and Slovenia, topping the charts in all three countries, while reaching the top ten in eleven additional countries. It was the 10th-best-selling single of 2014 in the UK. The song was released in the U.S. in late 2014 and has peaked at number 32.

== Background ==
Ezra told The Daily Telegraph that "Budapest" was "[his] first attempt to write a love song, and it uses the first three guitar chords [he] ever learned. There's a lot to be said for that simplicity." Ezra has also insisted that, despite its title, the lyrics of "Budapest" do not have anything to do with the Hungarian capital and that he had never even been there before. He said, "I was in Malmö in Sweden and the Eurovision Song Contest was being held in Malmö on that night, and I didn't have a clue about it but everyone there seemed to be really excited about it and having parties. But I didn't know you couldn't buy alcohol after 10 o'clock at night. So I ended up buying a bottle of like, rum, or something like that from a guy in a park so I could have something to drink at this party. Anyway, I was meant to be getting a train to Budapest the next day, and I never got it because I was too hungover and didn't fancy it. So I wrote the song about being miles from Budapest."

"Budapest" was originally released as part of Ezra's EP Did You Hear the Rain?, which contains the song of the same name. When asked about how the song became popular, Ezra revealed, "At first we gave it away as a free track off the/my EP for like a month, and then in Italy it just kicked off for some reason. I've never even been over there, but [the song] was just huge on the radio. It kind of happened overnight. Then it went over [to] Germany and when we released it in the UK, it took off there as well."

== Composition ==
With a tempo of 128 bpm, the song "Budapest" is composed in the key of F major.

== Critical reception ==
Chris Willman of Billboard called it an "acoustically inclined, eminently hummable single".

== Chart performance ==
In 2015, "Budapest" became a sleeper hit in the United States. It debuted at number 81 on the Billboard Hot 100 in February 2015, and peaked at number 32 in May. It charted for 30 weeks on Adult Alternative Airplay, 10 of which were spent at the pole position; in February 2021, for the chart's 25th anniversary, Billboard ranked "Budapest" at number 12 on its list of the 100 most successful songs in the chart's history. The song performed well on several other Billboard airplay charts, reaching number 6 on Adult Top 40, number 9 on the overall Rock Airplay chart, and number 14 on Adult Contemporary.

== Music video ==
An official music video for "Budapest" was first released onto YouTube on 21 April 2014. It consists of a large crowd of people all with different styles and accessories all standing motionless together in a tight-knit crowd, occasionally being inter-cut with footage of one of them doing something minor like shifting slightly where they stand, one of them sneezing gaining the attention of everyone around and George playing his guitar and singing to the camera with a smile. As the video goes on, the people start to move and interact by passing their accessories around, a group of three young men having one of them bite into a very spicy chili pepper, a party attendee in a sash and tiara talking on the phone to someone, the crowd looking up together and putting on 3-D glasses, all inter-cut with George crowd-surfing them and playing and singing to the camera again.

As the video starts to come to an end, George begins to crowd-surf standing up instead, taking off his guitar and passing it down to join all the other accessories being passed around, this time with people interacting more and dancing together. The video ends with George singing with his guitar standing in the again-motionless crowd; when the song ends he simply stops and becomes motionless too. In a small epilogue, some members of the crowd are all on the floor silently cheering, laughing and clapping together.

== Formats and track listings ==
- Digital download (United Kingdom)
1. "Budapest" – 3:20
- CD single (Germany)
1. "Budapest" – 3:23
2. "Angry Hill" – 4:11

== Charts ==
=== Weekly charts ===
Chart (2013–2015)	Peak position
Australia (ARIA)	5
Austria (Ö3 Austria Top 40)	1
Belgium (Ultratop 50 Flanders)	7
Belgium (Ultratop 50 Wallonia)	19
Canada Hot 100 (Billboard)	24
Canada Rock (Billboard)	9
Czech Republic Airplay (ČNS IFPI)	1
Czech Republic Singles Digital (ČNS IFPI)	11
Denmark (Tracklisten)	12
France (SNEP)	4
Germany (GfK)	3
Hungary (Single Top 40)	19
Hungary (Stream Top 40)	26
Iceland (RÚV)	3
Ireland (IRMA)	4
Israel International Airplay (Media Forest)	3
Italy (FIMI)	6
Netherlands (Dutch Top 40)	3
Netherlands (Single Top 100)	4
New Zealand (Recorded Music NZ)	1
Romania (Airplay 100)	39
Romania TV Airplay (Media Forest)	10
Scottish Singles Sales (Official Charts)	3
Slovakia Airplay (ČNS IFPI)	3
Slovakia Singles Digital (ČNS IFPI)	17
Slovenia (SloTop50)	1
South Africa Airplay (EMA)	2
Spain (Promusicae)	50
Sweden (Sverigetopplistan)	25
Switzerland (Schweizer Hitparade)	7
UK Singles (Official Charts)	3
US Billboard Hot 100	32
US Adult Alternative Airplay (Billboard)	1
US Adult Contemporary (Billboard)	14
US Adult Pop Airplay (Billboard)	6
US Hot Rock & Alternative Songs (Billboard)	2
US Pop Airplay (Billboard)	19
US Rock & Alternative Airplay (Billboard)	9

=== Year-end charts ===
Chart (2014)	Position
Australia (ARIA)	19
Austria (Ö3 Austria Top 40)	8
Belgium (Ultratop Flanders)	17
Belgium (Ultratop Wallonia)	35
France (SNEP)	38
Germany (Official German Charts)	15
Hungary (Single Top 40)	71
Italy (FIMI)	20
Netherlands (Dutch Top 40)	5
Netherlands (Single Top 100)	15
New Zealand (Recorded Music NZ)	16
Slovenia (SloTop50)	3
Sweden (Sverigetopplistan)	95
Switzerland (Schweizer Hitparade)	24
UK Singles (OCC)	13
US Hot Rock Songs (Billboard)	76
Chart (2015)	Position
Canada (Canadian Hot 100)	49
Slovenia (SloTop50)	30
UK Singles (OCC)	55
US Billboard Hot 100	89
US Adult Contemporary (Billboard)	40
US Adult Top 40 (Billboard)	20
US Hot Rock Songs (Billboard)	7
US Rock Airplay (Billboard)	40
Chart (2016)	Position
Brazil (Brasil Hot 100)	85
Slovenia (SloTop50)	32

=== Decade-end charts ===
Chart (2010–2019)	Position
UK Singles (Official Charts Company)	20

== Certifications ==
Region	Certification	Certified units/sales
Australia (ARIA)	9× Platinum	630,000^{‡}
Austria (IFPI Austria)	Gold	15,000^{*}
Belgium (BRMA)	Platinum	30,000^{*}
Canada (Music Canada)	3× Platinum	240,000^{‡}
Denmark (IFPI Danmark)	3× Platinum	270,000^{‡}
Germany (BVMI)	Platinum	300,000^{^}
Italy (FIMI)	3× Platinum	90,000^{‡}
Mexico (AMPROFON)	Platinum	60,000^{‡}
Netherlands (NVPI)	Gold	10,000^{^}
New Zealand (RMNZ)	8× Platinum	240,000^{‡}
Norway (IFPI Norway)	Platinum	10,000^{‡}
South Africa (RISA)	3× Platinum	60,000^{‡}
Spain (Promusicae)	Platinum	60,000^{‡}
Sweden (GLF)	2× Platinum	80,000^{‡}
Switzerland (IFPI Switzerland)	Platinum	30,000^{^}
United Kingdom (BPI)	6× Platinum	3,600,000^{‡}
United States (RIAA)	4× Platinum	4,000,000^{‡}
Streaming
Denmark (IFPI Danmark)	Platinum	2,600,000^{†}
^{*} Sales figures based on certification alone.^{^} Shipments figures based on certification alone.^{‡} Sales+streaming figures based on certification alone.^{†} Streaming-only figures based on certification alone.

== Release history ==
Region	Date	Format	Label
Italy	13 December 2013	Contemporary hit radio	Sony
Germany	18 April 2014	CD single	Sony
United Kingdom	13 June 2014	Digital download	Sony
United States	25 August 2014	Adult album alternative radio	Columbia
United States	23 September 2014	Modern rock radio	Columbia
United States	27 October 2014	Hot adult contemporary radio	Columbia
