= Cassy O' =

Single by George Ezra

from the album Wanted on Voyage
- Released: 7 March 2014
- Recorded: 2013
- Genre: Folk; blues; rock
- Length: 3:04
- Label: Columbia; Sony
- Songwriter(s): George Ezra; Joel Pott; Cam Blackwood
- Producer(s): Cam Blackwood

George Ezra singles chronology
"Budapest" (2013)	"Cassy O'" (2014)	"Blame It on Me" (2014)

"Cassy O'" is a song by British singer-songwriter George Ezra. It was released as the third single from his debut studio album Wanted on Voyage (2014). The song was released in the United Kingdom as a digital download on 7 March 2014 through Columbia Records.

"Cassy O'" was re-released on 23 February 2015 to co-incide with Ezra's performance at the 2015 Brit Awards and has since peaked at number 70 on the UK Singles Chart.

== Music video ==
A music video to accompany the release of "Cassy O'" was first released onto YouTube on 24 February 2014 at a total length of three minutes and eleven seconds. In an interview with The Student Pocket Guide, when asked about the concept behind the video, Ezra said, "The whole point was to get as many Os, circle shapes, in one video."

== Track listing ==
Digital download
No.	Title	Length
1.	"Cassy O'"	3:04

EP digital download
No.	Title	Length
1.	"Cassy O'"	3:04
2.	"Get Lonely with Me"	3:03
3.	"Over the Creek"	3:44
4.	"Coat of Armour"	3:57

== Charts ==
Chart (2014–15)	Peak position
Belgium (Ultratip Bubbling Under Flanders)	3
Belgium (Ultratip Bubbling Under Wallonia)	23
Iceland (RÚV)	14
Scotland (OCC)	37
UK Singles (OCC)	59

== Certifications ==
Region	Certification	Certified units/sales
United Kingdom (BPI)	Gold	400,000^{‡}
^{‡} Sales+streaming figures based on certification alone.

== Release history ==
Region	Date	Format	Label
United Kingdom	7 March 2014	Digital download	Columbia; Sony
Australia	7 March 2014	Digital download	Columbia; Sony
