= Did You Hear the Rain? =

Single by George Ezra

from the album Wanted on Voyage
- Released: 1 November 2013, 11 May 2015 (UK re-release)
- Recorded: 2013
- Genre: Folk; blues; rock
- Length: 2:57
- Label: Columbia
- Songwriter(s): George Ezra; Matt Allchin
- Producer(s): Cam Blackwood

George Ezra singles chronology
"Did You Hear the Rain?" (2013)	"Budapest" (2013)

"Did You Hear the Rain?" is the debut single by British singer-songwriter George Ezra. It was released as the lead single from his debut studio album Wanted on Voyage (2014). The song was released as a digital EP on 1 November 2013 in Italy and as a digital single in the United Kingdom on 11 April 2014 through Columbia Records. The song peaked at number 72 in Austria.

"Did You Hear the Rain?" was re-released in the UK on 11 May 2015.

== Background and inspiration ==
In an interview with Australian music website FasterLouder, Ezra claimed that "The whole point of ["Did You Hear the Rain?"] was looking at characters – and I wrote that song actually when I was, I must have been 18, and I was looking into the fact that no matter who you meet, no matter how you meet them, they're gonna have more than one side to their personality. I'm not saying that they're gonna be split personality but you meet people at a certain time on a certain day and they might be different to if you met them, and I thought that about myself as well so I wrote the not-so-nice side."

Regarding the recording of the song, he said, "What could be a weird beat on Did You Hear the Rain? is actually three loops we found and mixed together – someone beat boxing, someone playing didgeridoo, and another I can't remember. We fed loops through distortion, then made beats out of it. There's tons of that going on in the songs, which was fun in the studio, but now that I've got a band, is a ball ache to try to recreate live."

== Critical reception ==
Hannah Skolnick reviewed the song positively, calling it: "Equally catchy, but darker and with a greater depth," and that "Ezra scratches and howls out his chorus 'you can try and run and hide, tearing at the chain oh, Lucifer's inside.' Complete with full instrumentation, the sound is dense and imposing, yet some of his tonal delicacy has been lost in the studio recording". Amy Davidson of Digital Spy gave the song 4/5 stars: "'Did You Hear the Rain?' happened to be the track that introduced the world to George Ezra. Released in the slightly different context of a number one album, the track proves why the singer-songwriter has managed to stick around since it debuted. With dark, vengeful lyrics that name-check Lucifer himself, not to mention Ezra's deep, bluesy voice, 'Did You Hear the Rain?' showcases the range and depth of George Ezra."

== Music video ==
A music video to accompany the release of "Did You Hear the Rain?" was first released onto YouTube on 6 November 2013 at a total length of two minutes and fifty-eight seconds.

== Track listing ==
Digital download

1. "Budapest" – 3:22
2. "Did You Hear the Rain?" – 2:57
3. "Benjamin Twine" – 2:53
4. "Angry Hill" – 4:10

== Charts ==
Chart (2014)	Peak position
Austria (Ö3 Austria Top 40)	72
France (SNEP)	169
Ireland (IRMA)	89

== Certifications ==
Region	Certification	Certified units/sales
United Kingdom (BPI)	Silver	200,000^{‡}
^{‡} Sales+streaming figures based on certification alone.

== Release history ==
Region	Date	Format	Label
Italy	1 November 2013	Digital download	Columbia
United Kingdom	11 April 2014	Digital download	Columbia
