= George Ezra =

English singer-songwriter (born 1993)

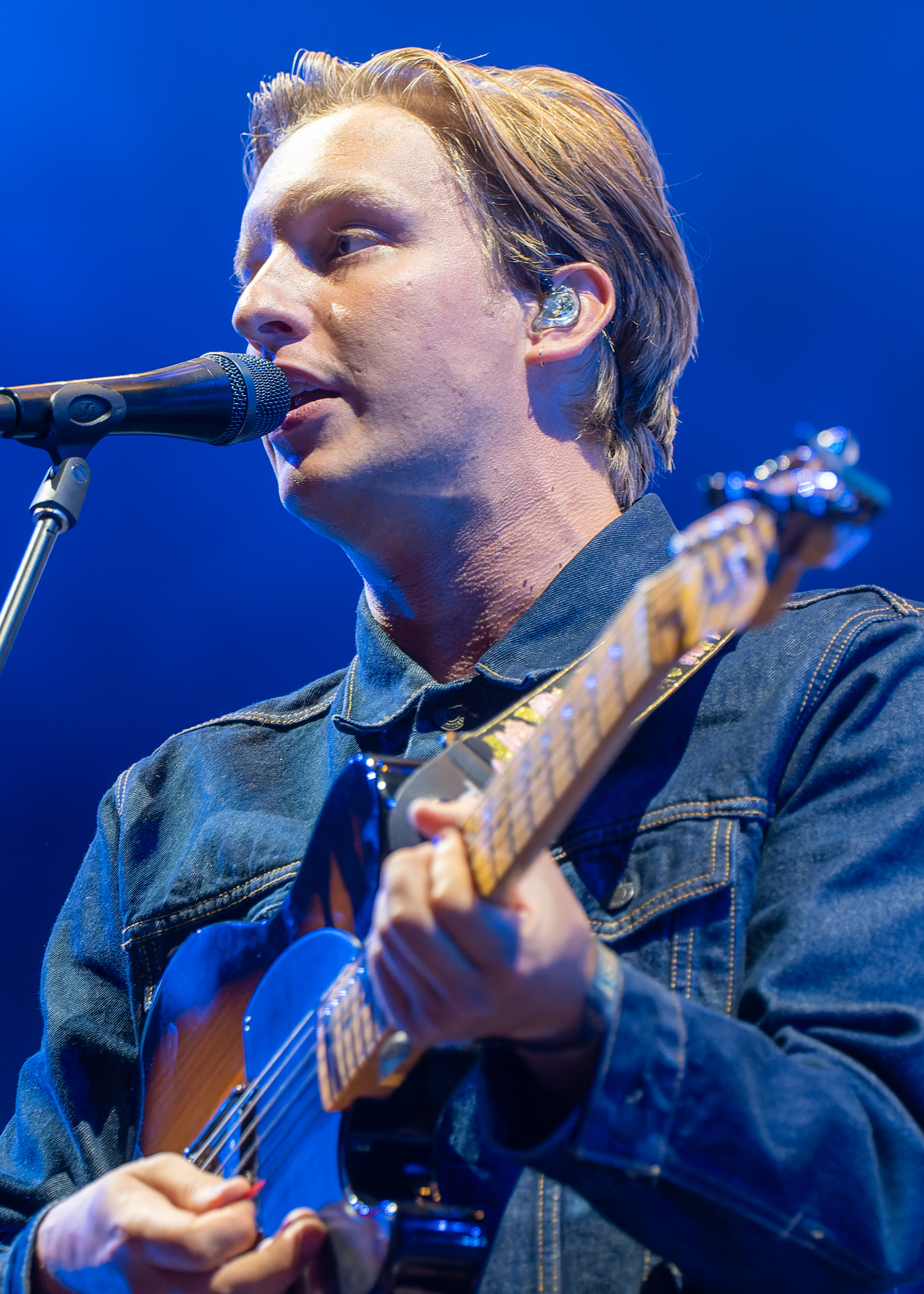
- Ezra performing in 2022

Background information
- Born: George Ezra Barnett; 7 June 1993 (age 33); Hertford, Hertfordshire, England
- Genres: Folk rock; folk pop; soul; blues
- Occupation: Singer-songwriter
- Instruments: Vocals; guitar
- Years active: 2011–present
- Labels: Columbia; Sony
- Website: georgeezra.com

George Ezra Barnett (born 7 June 1993) is an English singer-songwriter. After releasing two EPs, Did You Hear the Rain? (2013) and Cassy O' (2014), Ezra rose to prominence with the release of his hit single "Budapest", which reached number one in several countries. His debut studio album, Wanted on Voyage, was released in June 2014, reaching number one in the UK and the top ten in seven other countries. It was also the third-best-selling album of 2014 in the UK.

Ezra's second studio album, Staying at Tamara's, was released in March 2018 and reached number one in the UK and the top ten in eight other countries. The second single from the album, "Paradise", reached number two in the UK, while the next single, "Shotgun", reached number one, becoming Ezra's first chart-topping single in the UK, Ireland and Australia. In February 2019, he won the Brit Award for British Male Solo Artist. Ezra released his third studio album, Gold Rush Kid, in June 2022. It became his third consecutive UK number one album.

== Early life ==
George Ezra Barnett was born on 7 June 1993 in Hertford, Hertfordshire. His parents were teachers, with his father, Paul, teaching at Barnwell School in Stevenage. Barnett attended Bengeo Primary School and then Simon Balle Secondary School. He studied at Hertford Regional College. He moved to Bristol in 2011 to study songwriting at the British and Irish Modern Music Institute. Ezra has an elder sister named Jessica who accompanies him on tour, and a younger brother named Ethan who is also a singer-songwriter, under the stage name Ten Tonnes.

== Music career ==
=== 2013–2016: Wanted on Voyage ===
In June 2013, Ezra played the BBC Introducing Stage at Glastonbury Festival. He released his debut EP Did You Hear the Rain? in October 2013. In late 2013, he received airplay on BBC Radio 1, with songs "Did You Hear the Rain?" and "Budapest" regularly featured. He was included in MTV's Brand New for 2014, Vevo's 'DSCVR Ones to Watch 2014' and iTunes' new artists 2014. Ezra was longlisted for the BBC Sound of... 2014, where he eventually finished in fifth place.

"Budapest" reached number six in Italy and was certified platinum by the Federation of the Italian Music Industry. He has played support spots for Lianne La Havas, Bastille, Sam Smith and Tom Odell. In March 2014 he released his second EP, Cassy O'. "Budapest" was released in the UK on 13 June, followed by his debut album, Wanted on Voyage, on 30 June. On 6 July, the album entered the UK Albums Chart at number three. The album has also charted in Australia, Austria, Belgium, Denmark, Germany, Ireland, the Netherlands and New Zealand. On 5 October 14 weeks after its initial release, Wanted on Voyage went to number one in the UK. In December 2014 the album had sold 678,156 copies in the UK. In January 2015 it was named the third best-selling album of 2014 in the UK after x by Ed Sheeran and In the Lonely Hour by Sam Smith. On 4 January 2015, the album reclaimed the number one spot in the UK.

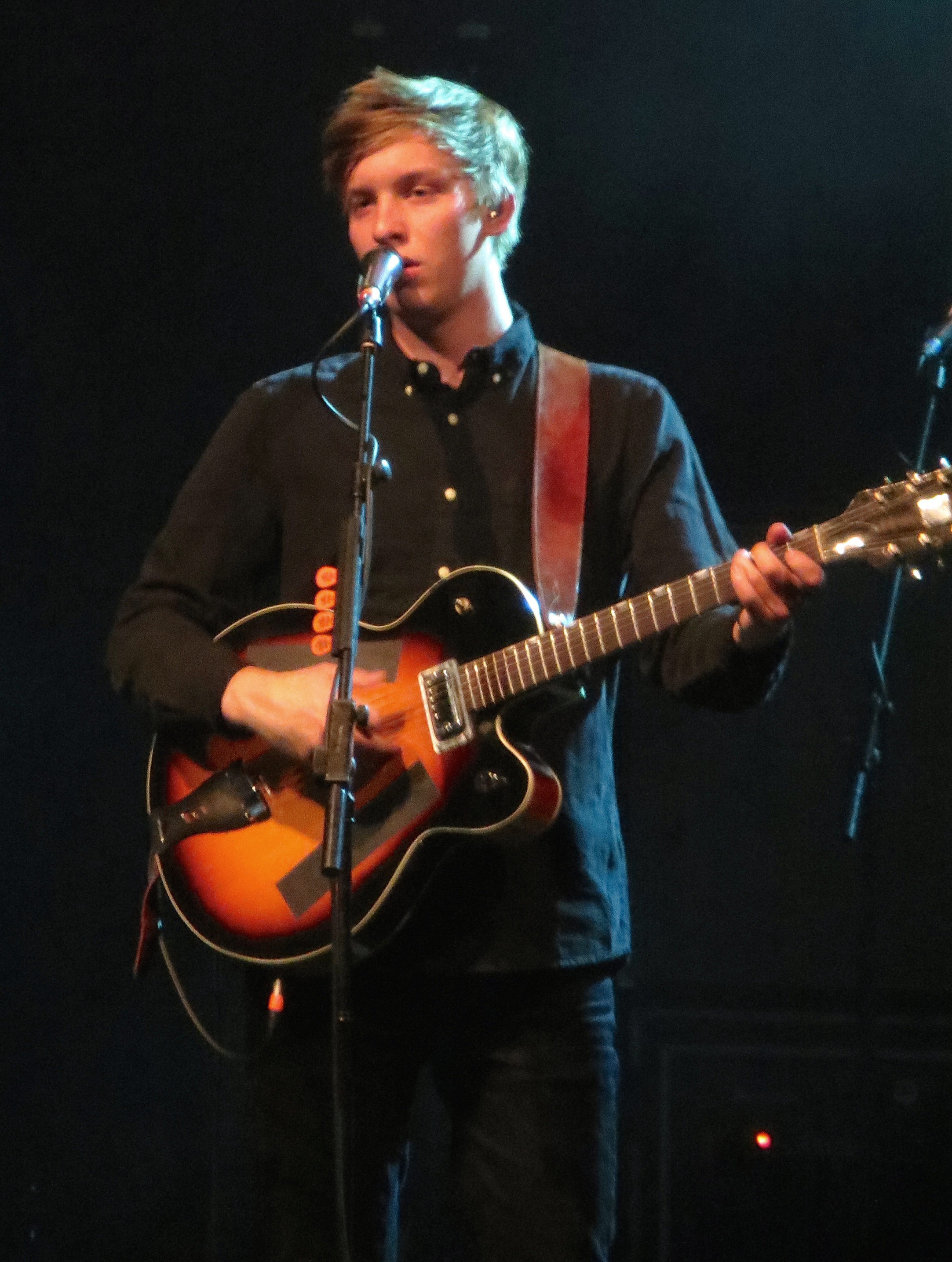
Ezra performing at the O2 Academy Glasgow in 2015

On 10 August 2014, Ezra was a support act for Robert Plant at the Glastonbury Extravaganza. In October 2014, Ezra released a video for "Listen to the Man", which featured Ian McKellen. At the 2015 Brit Awards, Ezra was nominated for four Brit Awards: Best British Album, Best British Male Solo Artist, Best British Single, and British Breakthrough Artist.

In early 2015, Ezra opened for Sam Smith for 16 dates on Smith's In the Lonely Hour Tour across North America. Later, he toured with Irish musician Hozier for select dates on his sold-out 2015 North American tour.

On 28 March 2015, Ezra was the musical guest on Saturday Night Live. He appeared on U.S. television again a few weeks later, performing "Budapest" on The Late Late Show with James Corden on 13 April. On 24 May, Ezra appeared at Radio 1's Big Weekend at Norwich, Norfolk with a set that included his hit songs including "Blame It on Me", "Budapest" and "Cassy O".

On 31 July 2015, Ezra performed at the Osheaga Festival in Montreal. On 11 November 2015, he performed "Blame It on Me" on The Late Show with Stephen Colbert.

=== 2017–2019: Staying at Tamara's ===
On 3 April 2017, Ezra announced a "top secret", 10 date UK and Ireland tour, in which it was announced that he would premiere new material. Starting on 26 May at Limelight in Belfast, the tour made its way through shows in Derry (27 May), Dublin (29 May), Limerick (30 May), Rhyl (1 June), Cardiff (2 June), Swansea (3 June), Barnstaple (5 June), and Exeter (6 June) before finally concluding on 7 June at The Forum in Bath.

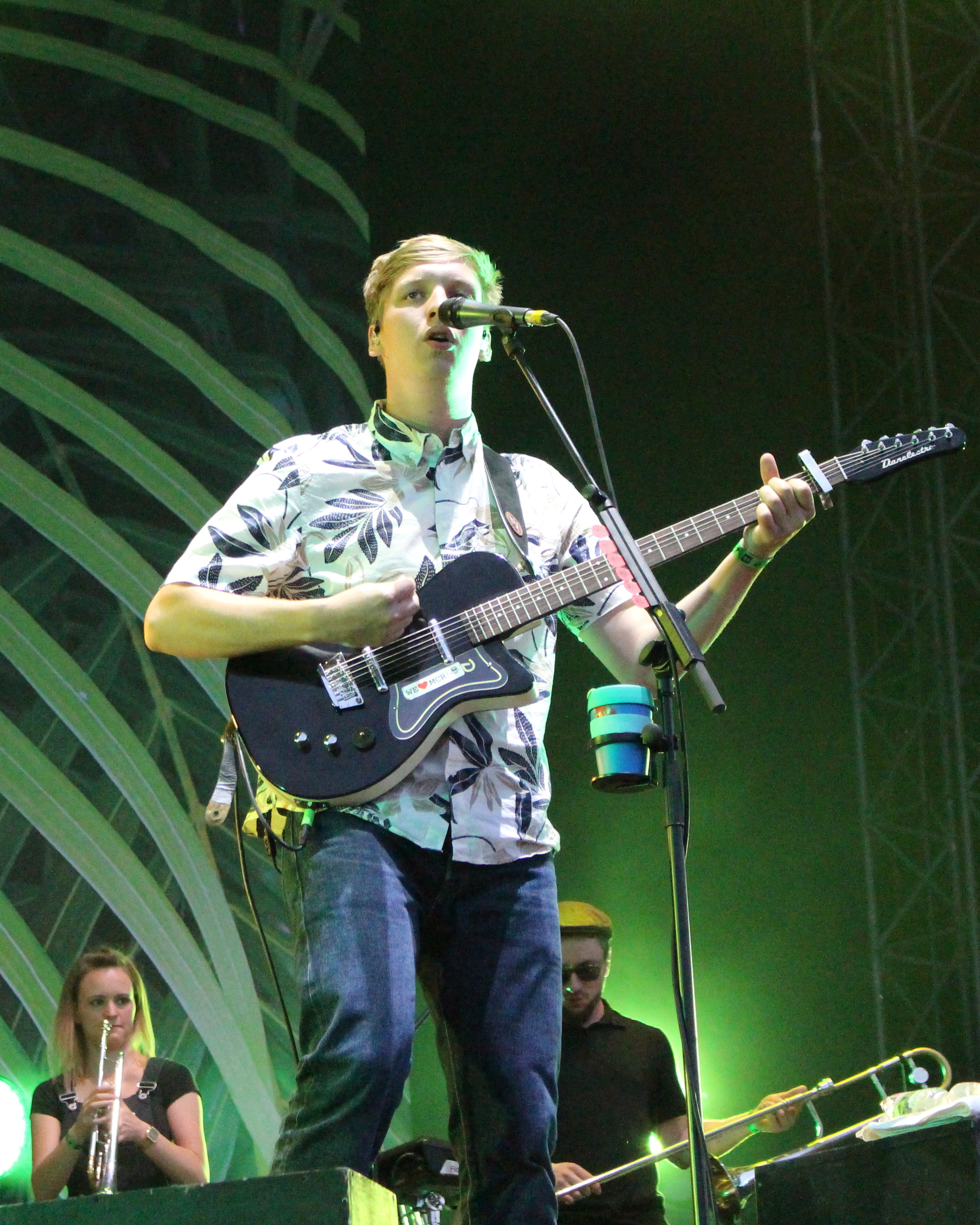
Ezra in 2017

"Don't Matter Now" was released on 16 June as the lead track of the album Staying at Tamara's. "Paradise" was released as the second single on 19 January 2018, with an accompanying music video released the following week on 24 January. "Shotgun" was released as a digital download on 18 May 2018 and went on to become Ezra's first number one song in the United Kingdom, Ireland and Australia, and was awarded a platinum certification. Staying at Tamara's was released on 23 March 2018. Ezra performed as one of the main headliners for Neighbourhood Weekender 2019, which was held in Warrington on 25 May 2019. He was the last act on the main stage on the first day of the two-day festival. He performed a variety of songs from his albums including hits "Blame It On Me", "Budapest" and "Barcelona"; his final song of the set was "Shotgun". Ezra also performed at Glastonbury 2019 on 26 June 2019, as the second to last set on the Pyramid stage.

During this period, the songs "Reinvent the Sky" and "Ask Your Sister" were released as exclusive b-sides to the "Shotgun" and "Paradise" vinyl record singles respectively. These songs were not included in the album, and were not uploaded to any streaming service.

=== 2022–2023: Gold Rush Kid ===
On 12 January 2022, Ezra launched a new website by the name of 'Gold Rush Kid', which was a holding page for his third record. "Anyone for You (Tiger Lily)" was released on 28 January as the first single from the album Gold Rush Kid.

Ezra covered Mimi Webb's House on Fire during a BBC Radio 1 Live Lounge performance, in addition to performing his new single Green Green Grass on 19 May.

The follow-up to 2018's Staying at Tamara's was released on 10 June via Columbia, and was written and produced entirely in London by Ezra and his longstanding collaborator Joel Pott. Ezra also performed at the Platinum Party at the Palace to celebrate Queen Elizabeth II's Platinum Jubilee in June 2022.

Ezra had plans to tour various countries in Europe from February 2023 up to July 2023.

== Musical style ==
Ezra cites Bob Dylan and Woody Guthrie as his main musical influences. The Financial Times described it as music that "approximates rock… but without any hint of danger, or unpredictability". When the Gramophone Rings described him as having "a voice beyond his years", with "a soulful tone that somehow would feel more at home coming from an Alabama bartender than a 21-year-old Bristolian". Zane Lowe, a former BBC Radio 1 DJ, called him "one of the most compelling and powerful new vocalists around".

A youthful obsession with Dylan prompted Ezra to seek out earlier American folk and blues artists. "Out of curiosity, I went to find how high I can jump off a cliff", he said. "That's when I found Lead Belly, Woody Guthrie and Howlin' Wolf." Ezra had heard a Lead Belly compilation and had simply tried to sing like him. "On the back of the record, it said his voice was so big, you had to turn your record player down", Ezra said. "I liked the idea of singing with a big voice, so I tried it, and I could."

== Podcasts ==
On 12 February 2018, Ezra released the first episode of his podcast George Ezra & Friends, a show that typically ranges from 45 minutes to an hour and a half during which he talks to other artists. Ezra's inspiration for the podcast was listening to other podcasts featuring "comedians chatting with other comedians".

== Personal life ==
Some time after the release of his first album, Ezra met and later began dating Florrie Arnold; the relationship ended after three years.

Ezra has stated he has Pure O, a form of obsessive compulsive disorder that consists of obsessions and anxiety with purely mental, not physical, compulsions. During lockdown, he took up Transcendental Meditation (TM). He explained: "TM is a kind of meditation for me. It's just 20 minutes of eyes closed, and you repeat a word, a mantra. Oftentimes I don't get many times through the mantra, I just think about all sorts of nonsense, but it's 20 minutes of stopping, which is good."

== Discography ==
- Wanted on Voyage (2014)
- Staying at Tamara's (2018)
- Gold Rush Kid (2022)

== Awards and nominations ==
| Year | Organization | Nominated work | Award | Result | Ref. |
|---|---|---|---|---|---|
| 2014 | BBC Music Awards | "Budapest" | Song of the Year | Nominated | |
| 2015 | Brit Awards | Himself | British Breakthrough Act | Nominated | |
| 2015 | Brit Awards | Himself | British Male Solo Artist | Nominated | |
| 2015 | Brit Awards | Wanted on Voyage | British Album of the Year | Nominated | |
| 2015 | Brit Awards | "Budapest" | British Single of the Year | Nominated | |
| 2015 | YouTube Music Awards | Himself | 50 artists to watch | Won | |
| 2015 | Teen Choice Awards | "Budapest" | Choice Rock Song | Nominated | |
| 2015 | MTV Video Music Awards | "Budapest" | Artist to Watch | Nominated | |
| 2016 | BMI London Awards | "Budapest" | Song of the Year | Nominated | |
| 2018 | BBC Radio 1 | "Shotgun" | Hottest Record of the Year | Sixth | |
| 2018 | BBC Radio 1's Teen Awards | "Shotgun" | Best Single | Won | |
| 2019 | Brit Awards | Himself | British Male Solo Artist | Won | |
| 2019 | Brit Awards | Staying at Tamara's | British Album of the Year | Nominated | |
| 2019 | Brit Awards | "Shotgun" | British Single of the Year | Nominated | |
| 2019 | Goldene Kamera | Himself | Best International Music | Won | |
| 2019 | GQ Men of the Year Awards | Himself | Live Act of the Year | Won | |
| 2023 | Brit Awards | Himself | Artist of the Year | Nominated | |
| 2023 | Brit Awards | "Green Green Grass" | Song Of The Year | Nominated | |
| 2023 | British Phonographic Industry | Himself | Brits Billion Award | Won | |

== Filmography ==
=== 2022: End to End ===
End to End is a documentary following George Ezra and his friends, Adam Scarborough and Christy Tattershall, on a journey from Land's End to John o' Groats. It premiered in theatres on 29 August, and was only available for one day. On 13 January 2023, it was released on Amazon Prime UK.

| Preceded by Zac Brown Band | Saturday Night Live musical guest 28 March 2015 | Succeeded by Carly Rae Jepsen |
