= Cam Blackwood =

Cameron Blackwood
- Origin: Alloway, Scotland
- Genres: Indie rock; dance; techno; house; punk rock; pop; folk
- Occupations: Record producer; songwriter; musician
- Instruments: Guitar; bass; keyboard; percussion
- Years active: 2000–present
- Labels: BMG Chrysalis
- Website: www.echobeachmanagement.com

Cameron "Cam" Blackwood is a British record producer, songwriter and musician.

He has previously been employed in various London recording studios including Roundhouse Studios in Farringdon, Miloco Studios, and Townhouse Studios in Chiswick, and has worked from his own studio (Voltaire Road Studios, Clapham) since 2010.

Managed by Echo Beach Management, his credits include George Ezra, London Grammar, Billie Marten, Jack Savoretti, British Sea Power, Alabama 3, Florence and the Machine, CSS and We Are Scientists.

He has previously been a part of the selection panel of the Sky Academy Arts Scholarship.

== Awards and nominations ==
Year	Award	Category	Result
2014	Music Producers Guild	Breakthrough Producer of the Year	Nominated

Year	Award	Category	Result
2019	Music Producers Guild	UK Producer of the Year	Nominated

Year	Award	Category	Result
2020	Music Producers Guild	UK Producer of the Year	Nominated

== Production discography ==
- Wanted on Voyage – George Ezra (2014)
- Bitter Pill – Gavin James (2015)
- Sleep No More – Jack Savoretti (2016)
- Under Stars – Amy Macdonald (2017)
- Let the Dancers Inherit the Party – Sea Power (2017)
- Life Love Flesh Blood – Imelda May (2017)
- Staying at Tamara's – George Ezra (2018)
- Singing to Strangers – Jack Savoretti (2019)
- Dark Rainbow – Frank Carter and the Rattlesnakes (2024)
