= 2018 in British music charts =

List of years in British music charts
- … 2008; 2009; 2010; 2011; 2012; 2013; 2014; 2015; 2016; 2017; 2018; 2019; 2020; 2021; 2022; 2023; 2024; 2025; 2026; 2027; 2028 …
- Art; Archaeology; Architecture; Literature; Music; Philosophy; Science; +...

The British music charts are compiled by the Official Charts Company to measure sales of recorded music on compact disc and digital download. From 6 July, video streaming was included into the charts.

== Charts and sales ==
=== Number-one singles ===
The singles chart includes a proportion for streaming.

Key
†	Best performing single of the year

Chart date (week ending)	Song	Artist(s)	Chart sales	References
4 January	"Perfect"/“Perfect Duet”/“Perfect Symphony”	Ed Sheeran	75,639	
11 January	"Perfect"/“Perfect Duet”/“Perfect Symphony”	Ed Sheeran	57,035	
18 January	"Perfect"/“Perfect Duet”/“Perfect Symphony”	Ed Sheeran	49,550	
25 January	"River"	Eminem featuring Ed Sheeran	44,677	
1 February	"God's Plan"	Drake	54,513	
8 February	"God's Plan"	Drake	60,810	
15 February	"God's Plan"	Drake	56,554	
22 February	"God's Plan"	Drake	51,983	
1 March	"God's Plan"	Drake	60,313	
8 March	"God's Plan"	Drake	57,021	
15 March	"God's Plan"	Drake	55,254	
22 March	"God's Plan"	Drake	48,101	
29 March	"God's Plan"	Drake	45,581	
5 April	"These Days"	Rudimental featuring Jess Glynne, Macklemore & Dan Caplen	43,693	
12 April	"Freaky Friday"	Lil Dicky featuring Chris Brown	41,068	
19 April	"Nice for What"	Drake	51,187	
26 April	"One Kiss" †	Calvin Harris and Dua Lipa	70,106	
3 May	"One Kiss" †	Calvin Harris and Dua Lipa	83,485	
10 May	"One Kiss" †	Calvin Harris and Dua Lipa	69,742	
17 May	"One Kiss" †	Calvin Harris and Dua Lipa	71,997	
24 May	"One Kiss" †	Calvin Harris and Dua Lipa	62,000	
31 May	"One Kiss" †	Calvin Harris and Dua Lipa	54,424	
7 June	"One Kiss" †	Calvin Harris and Dua Lipa	53,252	
14 June	"One Kiss" †	Calvin Harris and Dua Lipa	49,432	
21 June	"I'll Be There"	Jess Glynne	37,959	
28 June	"Solo"	Clean Bandit featuring Demi Lovato	41,584	
5 July	"Shotgun"	George Ezra	53,696	
12 July	"Shotgun"	George Ezra	75,986	
19 July	"Three Lions"	The Lightning Seeds, David Baddiel & Frank Skinner	79,779	
26 July	"In My Feelings"	Drake	90,887	
2 August	"In My Feelings"	Drake	94,787	
9 August	"In My Feelings"	Drake	82,569	
16 August	"In My Feelings"	Drake	83,085	
23 August	"Shotgun"	George Ezra	68,287	
30 August	"Shotgun"	George Ezra	53,892	
6 September	"Eastside"	Benny Blanco, Khalid and Halsey	49,966	
13 September	"Promises"	Calvin Harris and Sam Smith	61,813	
20 September	"Promises"	Calvin Harris and Sam Smith	62,958	
27 September	"Promises"	Calvin Harris and Sam Smith	59,398	
4 October	"Promises"	Calvin Harris and Sam Smith	59,059	
11 October	"Promises"	Calvin Harris and Sam Smith	56,888	
18 October	"Funky Friday"	Dave featuring Fredo	54,421	
25 October	"Promises"	Calvin Harris and Sam Smith	52,187	
1 November	"Shallow"	Lady Gaga and Bradley Cooper	47,830	
8 November	"Shallow"	Lady Gaga and Bradley Cooper	48,704	
15 November	"Thank U, Next"	Ariana Grande	72,881	
22 November	"Thank U, Next"	Ariana Grande	95,439	
29 November	"Thank U, Next"	Ariana Grande	64,452	
6 December	"Thank U, Next"	Ariana Grande	55,405	
13 December	"Thank U, Next"	Ariana Grande	83,660	
20 December	"Thank U, Next"	Ariana Grande	58,450	
27 December	"We Built This City"	LadBaby	75,442	

=== Number-one albums ===
The albums chart includes a proportion for streaming.

Key
†	Best performing album of the year

Chart date (week ending)	Album	Artist(s)	Chart sales	References
4 January	÷	Ed Sheeran	74,158	
11 January	÷	Ed Sheeran	32,034	
18 January	The Greatest Showman †	Various artists	26,445	
25 January	The Greatest Showman †	Various artists	40,048	
1 February	The Greatest Showman †	Various artists	38,572	
8 February	The Greatest Showman †	Various artists	40,824	
15 February	The Greatest Showman †	Various artists	41,433	
22 February	The Greatest Showman †	Various artists	51,462	
1 March	The Greatest Showman †	Various artists	42,604	
8 March	The Greatest Showman †	Various artists	36,312	
15 March	The Greatest Showman †	Various artists	41,547	
22 March	The Greatest Showman †	Various artists	45,963	
29 March	The Greatest Showman †	Various artists	35,256	
5 April	Staying at Tamara's	George Ezra	62,564	
12 April	The Greatest Showman †	Various artists	43,378	
19 April	Golden	Kylie Minogue	48,032	
26 April	The Greatest Showman †	Various artists	30,080	
3 May	The Greatest Showman †	Various artists	24,978	
10 May	Beerbongs & Bentleys	Post Malone	43,190	
17 May	The Greatest Showman †	Various artists	28,180	
24 May	Tranquility Base Hotel & Casino	Arctic Monkeys	86,359	
31 May	The Greatest Showman †	Various artists	35,900	
7 June	The Greatest Showman †	Various artists	40,064	
14 June	The Greatest Showman †	Various artists	30,063	
21 June	The Greatest Showman †	Various artists	34,378	
28 June	The Greatest Showman †	Various artists	32,466	
5 July	The Greatest Showman †	Various artists	26,771	
12 July	Scorpion	Drake	63,690	
19 July	Scorpion	Drake	29,630	
26 July	Scorpion	Drake	29,393	
2 August	Mamma Mia! Here We Go Again	Various artists	35,000	
9 August	Mamma Mia! Here We Go Again	Various artists	40,708	
16 August	Mamma Mia! Here We Go Again	Various artists	35,488	
23 August	Mamma Mia! Here We Go Again	Various artists	30,129	
30 August	Sweetener	Ariana Grande	44,755	
6 September	Mamma Mia! Here We Go Again	Various artists	21,099	
13 September	Kamikaze	Eminem	55,115	
20 September	Kamikaze	Eminem	35,761	
27 September	Kamikaze	Eminem	29,402	
4 October	Kamikaze	Eminem	18,339	
11 October	Blood Red Roses	Rod Stewart	41,186	
18 October	A Star Is Born	Lady Gaga and Bradley Cooper	31,816	
25 October	Always In Between	Jess Glynne	36,449	
1 November	A Star Is Born	Lady Gaga and Bradley Cooper	24,982	
8 November	Sì	Andrea Bocelli	25,829	
15 November	No Tourists	The Prodigy	23,952	
22 November	Simulation Theory	Muse	44,320	
29 November	Love	Michael Bublé	66,794	
6 December	Odyssey	Take That	105,721	
13 December	A Brief Inquiry into Online Relationships	The 1975	50,209	
20 December	The Greatest Showman †	Various artists	56,694	
27 December	The Greatest Showman †	Various artists	68,606	

=== Number-one compilation albums ===
Key
†	Best performing compilation of the year

Chart date (week ending)	Album	Chart sales	References
4 January	Now 98	68,334	
11 January	Now 98	21,486	
18 January	Now 98	13,039	
25 January	Now 98	11,006	
1 February	MTV Rocks	15,555	
8 February	MTV Rocks	12,777	
15 February	MTV Rocks	11,830	
22 February	MTV Rocks	11,791	
1 March	MTV Rocks	7,560	
8 March	Magic 80s	10,227	
15 March	Now Mum	9,978	
22 March	Now Mum	10,584	
29 March	Andrew Lloyd Webber – Unmasked	9,067	
5 April	Now 99	114,571	
12 April	Now 99	60,163	
19 April	Now 99	33,768	
26 April	Now 99	24,030	
3 May	Now 99	19,774	
10 May	Now 99	16,793	
17 May	80s Soul Jams	16,803	
24 May	80s Soul Jams	13,816	
31 May	Now 99	11,095	
7 June	Now 99	11,751	
14 June	Throwback Reggae Dancehall	13,629	
21 June	Throwback Reggae Dancehall	16,301	
28 June	I Love Ibiza	12,659	
5 July	Now Summer Party 18		
12 July	Now Summer Party 18	11,847	
19 July	Love Island – The Pool Party	18,284	
26 July	Love Island – The Pool Party	10,561	
2 August	Now 100†	176,282	
9 August	Now 100†	75,657	
16 August	Now 100†	43,908	
23 August	Now 100†	27,550	
30 August	Now 100†	20,260	
6 September	Now 100†	16,642	
13 September	I Love 80s	16,025	
20 September	Now 100†	11,004	
27 September	Now 100†	9,447	
4 October	Now 100†	8,494	
11 October	Now 100†	8,303	
18 October	Now 100†	7,186	
25 October	Now 100†	6,465	
1 November	Sing Your Heart Out Disney	7,551	
8 November	Soul Legends	6,458	
15 November	Dreamboats & Petticoats – Golden Years	17,102	
22 November	Dreamboats & Petticoats – Golden Years	13,630	
29 November	The Greatest Showman: Reimagined	25,911	
6 December	Now 101	82,507	
13 December	Now 101	59,806	
20 December	Now 101	48,642	
27 December	Now 101	51,773	

=== Top singles of the year ===
This chart was published by the Official Charts Company in January 2019

Combined	Title	Artist(s)	Peak position	Combined
1	"One Kiss"	Calvin Harris and Dua Lipa	1	1,570,000
2	"God's Plan"	Drake	1	1,560,000
3	"Shotgun"	George Ezra	1	1,490,000
4	"This Is Me"	Keala Settle and The Greatest Showman Ensemble	3	1,400,000
5	"These Days"	Rudimental featuring Jess Glynne, Macklemore and Dan Caplen	1	1,390,000
6	"Perfect"	Ed Sheeran	1	
7	"Nice for What"	Drake	1	
8	"Paradise"	George Ezra	2	1,110,000
9	"No Tears Left to Cry"	Ariana Grande	2	
10	"Feel It Still"	Portugal. The Man	3	1,020,000
11	"IDGAF"	Dua Lipa	3	1,010,000
12	"2002"	Anne-Marie	3	
13	"Friends"	Marshmello & Anne-Marie	4	
14	"Freaky Friday"	Lil Dicky featuring Chris Brown	1	
15	"In My Feelings"	Drake	1	
16	"Solo"	Clean Bandit featuring Demi Lovato	1	
17	"Havana"	Camila Cabello featuring Young Thug	5 (Note: Reached number 1 in 2017)	
18	"The Greatest Show"	Hugh Jackman, Keala Settle, Zac Efron and Zendaya	20	
19	"Eastside"	Benny Blanco, Halsey and Khalid	1	
20	"New Rules"	Dua Lipa	13 (Note: Reached number 1 in 2017)	837,000
21	"Better Now"	Post Malone	6	
22	"Psycho"	Post Malone featuring Ty Dolla $ign	4	
23	"I Like It"	Cardi B, Bad Bunny and J Balvin	8	
24	"Rockstar"	Post Malone featuring 21 Savage	12 (Note: Reached number 1 in 2017)	
25	"Promises"	Calvin Harris & Sam Smith	1	
26	"Girls Like You"	Maroon 5 featuring Cardi B	7	
27	"Lullaby"	Sigala and Paloma Faith	6	
28	"Youngblood"	5 Seconds of Summer	4	
29	"Barking"	Ramz	2	
30	"River"	Eminem featuring Ed Sheeran	1	
31	"Shape of You"	Ed Sheeran	21 (Note: Reached number 1 in 2017)	
32	"Rewrite the Stars"	Zac Efron and Zendaya	16	
33	"Body"	Loud Luxury featuring Brando	4	
34	"I'll Be There"	Jess Glynne	1	
35	"The Middle"	Zedd, Maren Morris and Grey	7	
36	"Leave a Light On"	Tom Walker	7	
37	"A Million Dreams"	Ziv Zaifman, Hugh Jackman and Michelle Williams	22	
38	"All the Stars"	Kendrick Lamar & SZA	5	
39	"Breathe"	Jax Jones featuring Ina Wroldsen	7	
40	"Taste"	Tyga featuring Offset	5	
41	"Rise"	Jonas Blue featuring Jack & Jack	3	
42	"Jumanji"	B Young	13	
43	"Tip Toe"	Jason Derulo featuring French Montana	5	
44	"Never Enough"	Loren Allred	24	
45	"If You're Over Me"	Years & Years	6	
46	"Sad"	XXXTentacion	5	
47	"Meant to Be"	Bebe Rexha featuring Florida Georgia Line	11	
48	"I Miss You"	Clean Bandit featuring Julia Michaels	4	
49	"Anywhere"	Rita Ora	3 (Note: Reached number 2 in 2017)	
50	"Flames"	David Guetta featuring Sia	7	
51	"Answerphone"	Banx & Ranx & Ella Eyre featuring Yxng Bane	5	

=== Best-selling albums ===
No.	Title	Artist	Peak position	Sales
1	The Greatest Showman	Various artists	1	1,600,000
2	Staying at Tamara's	George Ezra	1	691,000
3	÷	Ed Sheeran	1	510,000
4	Mamma Mia! Here We Go Again: The Movie Soundtrack	Various artists	1	374,000
5	Scorpion	Drake	1	300,000
6	Beerbongs & Bentleys	Post Malone	1	
7	A Star Is Born	Lady Gaga & Bradley Cooper	1	
8	Love	Michael Bublé	1	
9	Dua Lipa	Dua Lipa	3	
10	Kamikaze	Eminem	1	
11	Odyssey	Take That	1	
12	Sì	Andrea Bocelli	1	
13	Bohemian Rhapsody: The Original Soundtrack	Queen	3	
14	Always In Between	Jess Glynne	1	
15	Blood Red Roses	Rod Stewart	1	
16	Sweetener	Ariana Grande	1	
17	The Architect	Paloma Faith	7 (Note: Reached number 1 in 2017)	
18	Tranquility Base Hotel & Casino	Arctic Monkeys	1	
19	Human	Rag'n'Bone Man	3 (Note: Reached number 1 in 2017)	
20	Gold: Greatest Hits	ABBA	6 (Note: Reached number 1 in 1992)	
21	The Thrill of It All	Sam Smith	2 (Note: Reached number 1 in 2017)	
22	×	Ed Sheeran	10 (Note: Reached number 1 in 2014)	
23	Unchained Melodies	Roy Orbison with the Royal Philharmonic Orchestra	4 (Note: Reached number 3 in 2019)	
24	The Platinum Collection	Queen	5 (Note: Reached number 2 in 2002)	
25	LM5	Little Mix	3	
26	Speak Your Mind	Anne-Marie	3	
27	Christmas	Michael Bublé	7 (Note: Reached number 1 in 2011)	
28	You Know I Know	Olly Murs	2	
29	Curtain Call: The Hits	Eminem	13 (Note: Reached number 1 in 2005)	
30	Glory Days	Little Mix	9 (Note: Reached number 1 in 2016)	
31	?	XXXTentacion	3	
32	Revival	Eminem	3 (Note: Reached number 1 in 2017)	
33	Golden	Kylie Minogue	1	
34	Beautiful Trauma	Pink	5 (Note: Reached number 1 in 2017)	
35	Time Flies... 1994–2009	Oasis	14 (Note: Reached number 1 in 2010)	
36	Diamonds	Elton John	10 (Note: Reached number 5 in 2017)	
37	Reputation	Taylor Swift	7 (Note: Reached number 1 in 2017)	
38	Legend	Bob Marley and the Wailers	16 (Note: Reached number 1 in 1984)	
39	The Very Best of Fleetwood Mac	Fleetwood Mac	11 (Note: Reached number 6 in 2009)	
40	Greatest Hits	Queen	23 (Note: Reached number 1 in 1981)	
41	Legacy	David Bowie	25 (Note: Reached number 5 in 2017)	
42	Stoney	Post Malone	14 (Note: Reached number 10 in 2017)	
43	Camila	Camila Cabello	2	
44	Mamma Mia!	Various artists	5	
45	50 Years – Don't Stop	Fleetwood Mac	8 (Note: Reached number 5 in 2019)	
46	Wanted on Voyage	George Ezra	10 (Note: Reached number 1 in 2014)	
47	Delta	Mumford & Sons	2	
48	Rumours	Fleetwood Mac	31 (Note: Reached number 1 in 1978)	
49	True Love Ways	Buddy Holly with the Royal Philharmonic Orchestra	10	
50	(What's the Story) Morning Glory?	Oasis	31 (Note: Reached number 1 in 1995)	
51	In the Lonely Hour	Sam Smith	19 (Note: Reached number 1 in 2014)	
52	AM	Arctic Monkeys	11 (Note: Reached number 1 in 2013)	
53	I Cry When I Laugh	Jess Glynne	23 (Note: Reached number 1 in 2015)	
54	Rise Up	Cliff Richard	4	
55	Invasion of Privacy	Cardi B	5	
56	High as Hope	Florence and the Machine	2	
57	+	Ed Sheeran	26 (Note: Reached number 1 in 2011)	
58	Wildness	Snow Patrol	2	
59	Shawn Mendes	Shawn Mendes	3	
60	As You Were	Liam Gallagher	16 (Note: Reached number 1 in 2017)	
61	More Life	Drake	25 (Note: Reached number 2 in 2017)	
62	17	XXXTentacion	11	
63	Number Ones	Michael Jackson	29 (Note: Reached number 1 in 2003)	
64	Pray for the Wicked	Panic! at the Disco	2	
65	Whatever People Say I Am, That's What I'm Not	Arctic Monkeys	18 (Note: Reached number 1 in 2006)	
66	Common Sense	J Hus	21 (Note: Reached number 6 in 2017)	
67	The Last King of Pop	Paul Heaton	10	
68	Astroworld	Travis Scott	3	

== See also ==
- List of number-one singles from 2010
- List of number-one albums from 2010
- List of UK top-ten singles in 2018
- 2010s in music
- List of 2018 albums
- 2018 in British television
