= List of UK top-ten singles in 2018 =

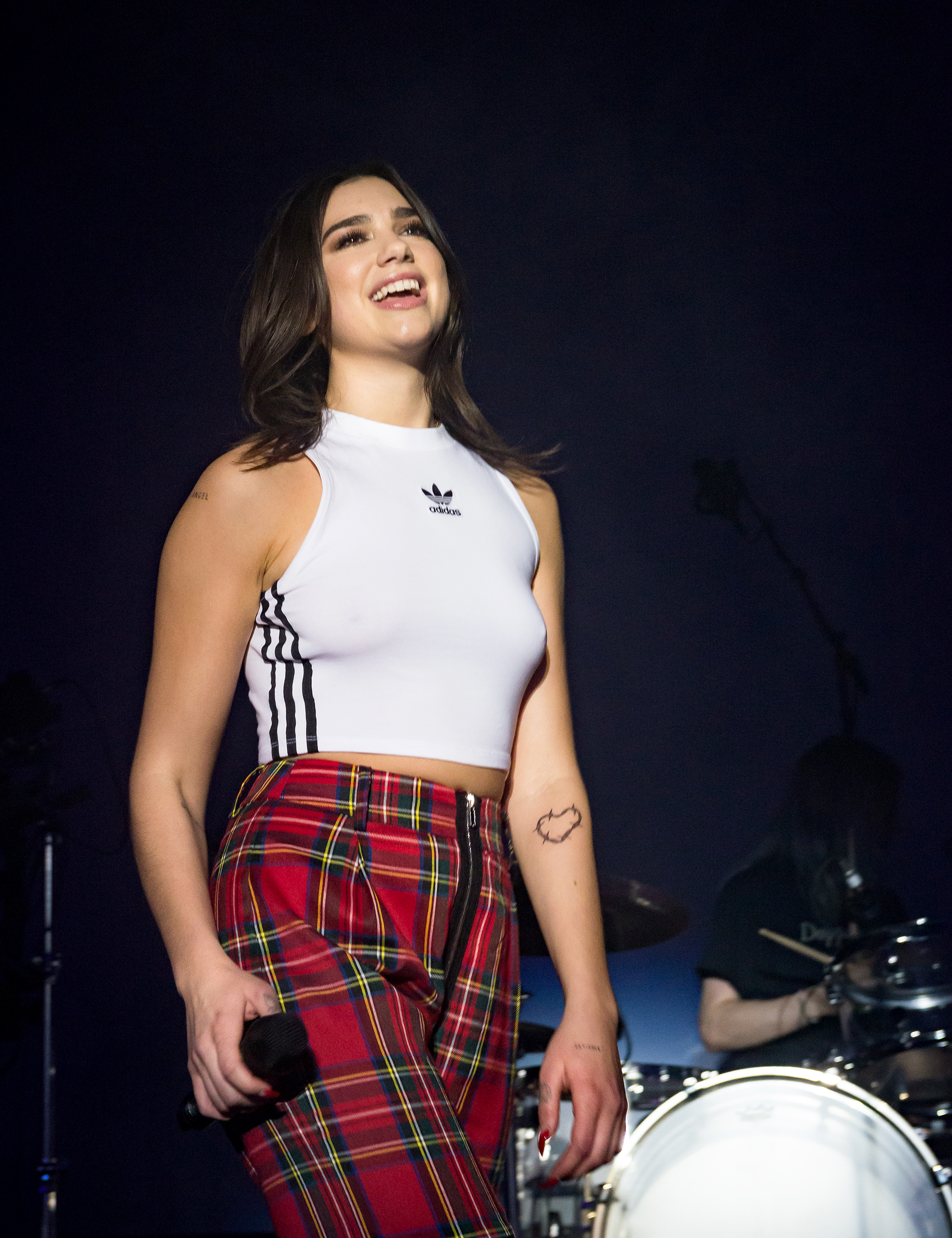
Dua Lipa provided vocals on Calvin Harris' "One Kiss", which spent eight weeks at number-one and became the best-selling single of 2018.

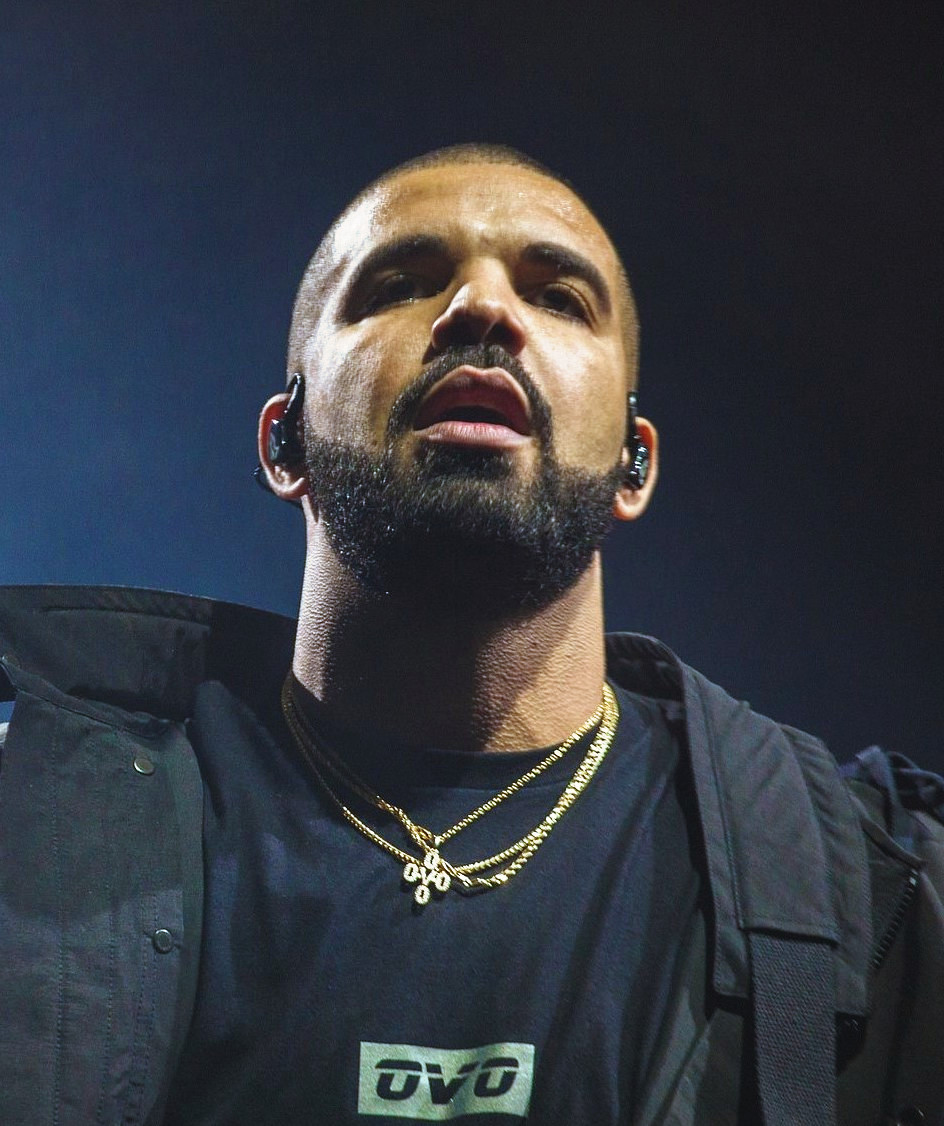
Drake secured the most top 10 entries of any artist this year, with six in total, including three number-one hits: "God's Plan", "Nice for What" and "In My Feelings".

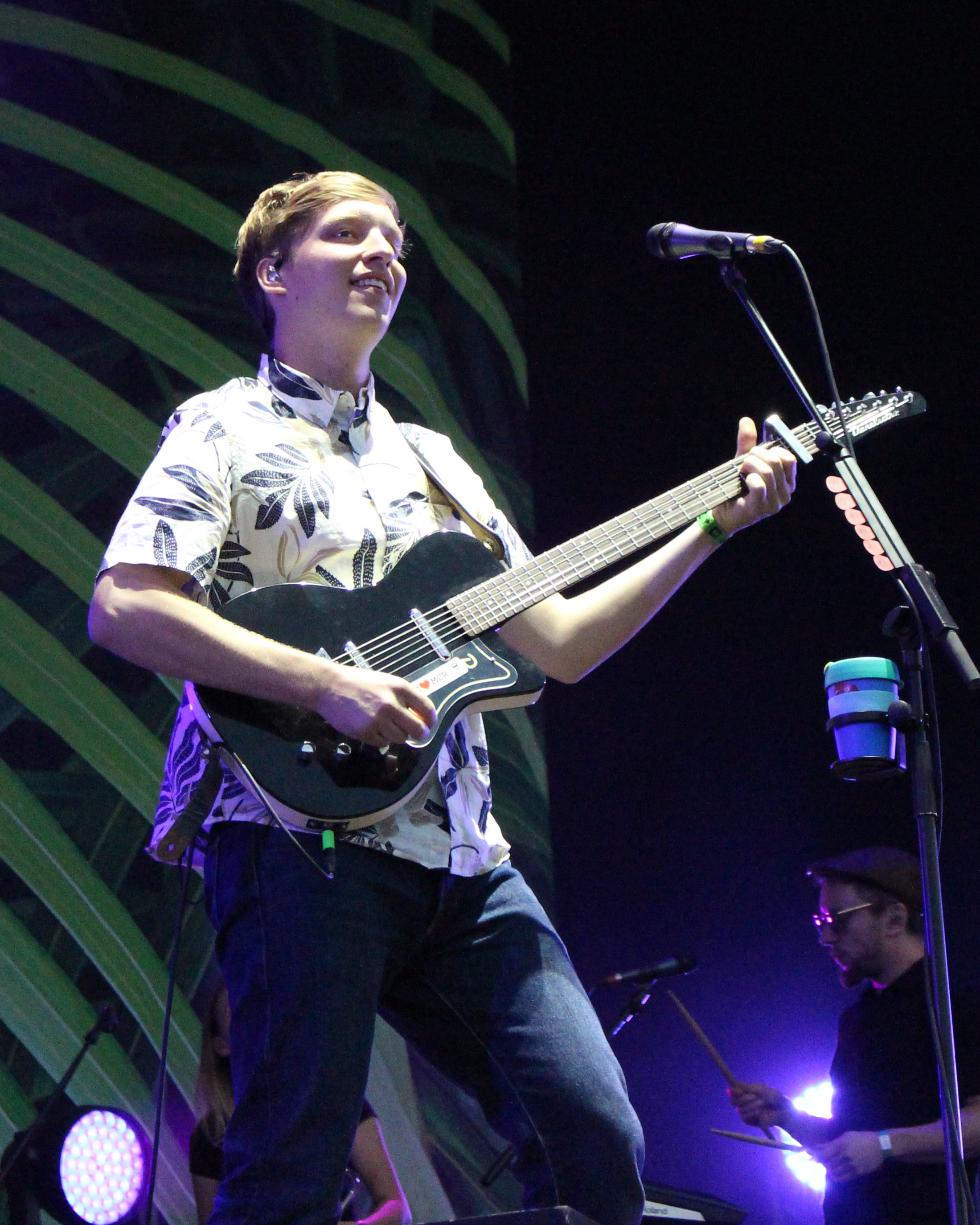
George Ezra scored two top 10 entries in 2018, including "Shotgun", which spent four non-consecutive weeks at number-one and became the third best selling single of the year.

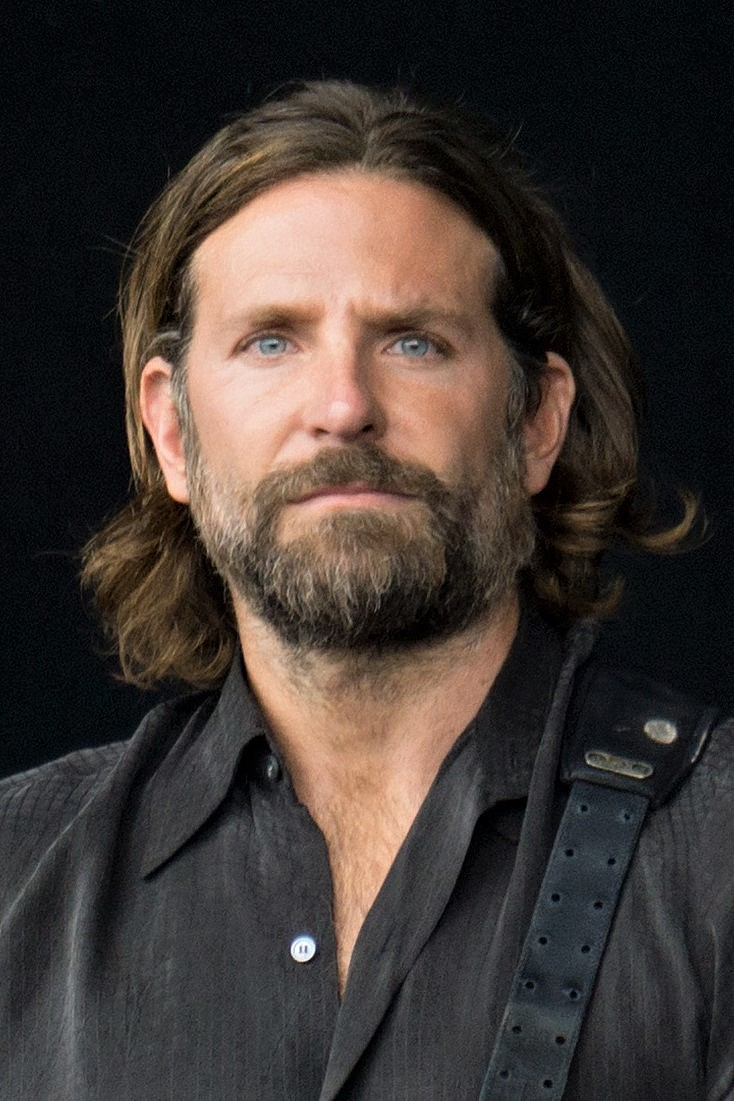
Bradley Cooper duetted with Lady Gaga on the song "Shallow", taken from the soundtrack of the film A Star Is Born. It entered the UK top 10 in October 2018, ultimately reaching the number-one spot for two weeks. "Shallow" went on to win the Academy Award for Best Original Song.

The UK Singles Chart is one of many music charts compiled by the Official Charts Company that calculates the best-selling singles of the week in the United Kingdom. Since 2004 the chart has been based on the sales of both physical singles and digital downloads, with airplay figures excluded from the official chart. Since 2014, the singles chart has been based on both sales and streaming, with the ratio altered in 2017 to 300:1 streams and only three singles by the same artist eligible for the chart. From July 2018, video streams from YouTube Music and Spotify among others began to be counted for the Official Charts. This list shows singles that peaked in the Top 10 of the UK Singles Chart during 2018, as well as singles which peaked in 2017 and 2019 but were in the top 10 in 2018. The entry date is when the song appeared in the top 10 for the first time (week ending, as published by the Official Charts Company, which is six days after the chart is announced).

Ninety-eight singles were in the top ten this year. Twelve singles from 2017 remained in the top 10 for several weeks at the beginning of the year, while "Nothing Breaks Like a Heart" by Mark Ronson featuring Miley Cyrus, "Rewrite the Stars" by James Arthur and Anne-Marie, "Sweet but Psycho" by Ava Max and "Sunflower" by Post Malone and Swae Lee were all released in 2018 but did not reach their peak until 2019. "Fairytale of New York" by The Pogues featuring Kirsty MacColl charted in the top 10 in 2017 and re-entered in 2018 but did not reach its peak until 2019. "Last Christmas" by Wham!, "Man's Not Hot" by Big Shaq, "17" by MK, "Let You Down" by NF, "River" by Eminem featuring Ed Sheeran and "I Miss You" by Clean Bandit featuring Julia Michaels were the singles from 2017 to reach their peak in 2018. Twenty-four artists scored multiple entries in the top 10 in 2018. Ava Max, Cardi B, Dave, Freya Ridings and Travis Scott were among the many artists who achieved their first UK charting top 10 single in 2018.

“Three Lions (Football's Coming Home)” by Baddiel, Skinner and The Lightning Seeds set two new chart records this year. The single first released ahead of Euro 96 returned to number-one for the fourth time during the 2018 FIFA World Cup, the only single to date to top the chart four times by the same artists. It also suffered the sharpest fall from the top spot, dropping 96 places the full chart week after England were knocked out of the tournament.

The 2017 Christmas number-one, "Perfect" by Ed Sheeran, remained at number-one for the first three weeks of 2018. The first new number-one single of the year was "River" by Eminem featuring Ed Sheeran. Overall, seventeen different singles peaked at number-one in 2018, with Drake (3) having the most singles hit that position.

== Background ==
=== Multiple entries ===
Ninety-eight singles charted in the top 10 in 2018, with ninety-three singles reaching their peak this year (including the re-entries "Do They Know It's Christmas?", "Fairytale of New York", "Last Christmas", "Merry Christmas Everyone" and "Rockin' Around the Christmas Tree" which charted in previous years but reached peaks on their latest chart run).

Twenty-four artists scored multiple entries in the top 10 in 2018, with Drake securing the record for most hit singles this year with six.

=== Introduction of video streaming ===
In June 2018, the Official Charts Company announced that official video streams from YouTube Music, Spotify, Apple Music and Tidal among other providers would become eligible for the chart from the following month alongside audio streams. “Shotgun” by George Ezra was the first single to reach number-one under the new rules, topping the chart on 5 July 2018 (week ending). His combined sales included around 3 million views of the music video.

“Girls Like You” by Maroon 5 and Cardi B was another single to benefit from the Official Charts Company's inclusion of video streams, rising from 13 to number 10 as the most streamed video of that week.

Drake also claimed his third chart-topper of the year thanks in part to the chart alterations, after "In My Feelings" became the subject of a viral craze, with the public and celebrities recreating dance moves from the music video.

=== FIFA World Cup effect ===
“Three Lions” made chart history as the first song to reach number-one on four occasions with the same line-up. The football anthem by Baddiel, Skinner and The Lightning Seeds renewed popularity was fuelled by a young England football team's unexpected success in reaching the FIFA World Cup semi-finals for the first time since 1990. The song's refrain “It's Coming Home” was a soundtrack to the tournament and led to demand for the track.

The single led the iTunes sales chart and Spotify Top 50 chart in the days leading up to the game, but was only announced as number-one on 13 July 2018, two days after the team were eliminated against Croatia.

As a result, the popularity of the song rapidly faded and it set another new record as the fastest falling number-one single in history, dropping ninety-six places to number 97 the following week. This was the steepest chart decline from number-one since "A Bridge over You" by The Lewisham and Greenwich NHS Choir went from Christmas number-one down to number 29 at the end of 2015.

=== Chart debuts ===
Forty artists achieved their first top 10 single in 2018, either as a lead or featured artist. XXXTentacion and Travis Scott both reached the top 10 on a second occasion. Cardi B had two other entries in her breakthrough year.

The following table (collapsed on desktop site) does not include acts who had previously charted as part of a group and secured their first top 10 solo single.

Artist	Number of top 10s	First entry	Chart position	Other entries
Cardi B	3	"Finesse"	5	"I Like It", "Girls Like You"
Ramz	1	"Barking"	2	—
Keala Settle	1	"This Is Me"	3	—
The Greatest Showman Ensemble	1	"This Is Me"	3	—
Ina Wroldsen	1	"Breathe"	7	—
Sigrid	1	"Strangers"	10	—
Dan Caplen	1	"These Days"	1	—
Portugal. The Man	1	"Feel It Still"	3	—
SZA	1	"All the Stars"	5	—
Chris Stapleton	1	"Say Something"	9	—
Maren Morris	1	"The Middle"	7	—
Lil Dicky	1	"Freaky Friday"	1	—
Banx & Ranx	1	"Answerphone"	7	—
Tom Walker	1	"Leave a Light On"	8	—
Bad Bunny	1	"I Like It"	9	—
XXXTentacion	2	"Sad!"	5	"Falling Down"
Jack & Jack	1	"Rise"	3	—
Dzeko	1	"Jackie Chan"	5	—
Preme	1	"Jackie Chan"	5	—
Loud Luxury	1	"Body"	4	—
Brando	1	"Body"	4	—
Travis Scott	2	"Sicko Mode"	9	"Zeze"
Benny Blanco	1	"Eastside"	1	—
Juice Wrld	1	"Lucid Dreams"	10	—
Joyner Lucas	1	"Lucky You"	6	—
Lil Pump	1	"I Love It"	3	—
Dynoro	1	"In My Mind"	8	—
Gigi D'Agostino	1	"In My Mind"	8	—
Silk City	1	"Electricity"	4	—
Lil Peep	1	"Falling Down"	10	—
Freya Ridings	1	"Lost Without You"	9	—
Dave	1	"Funky Friday"	1	—
Fredo	1	"Funky Friday"	1	—
Bradley Cooper	1	"Shallow"	1	—
Kodak Black	1	"Zeze"	7	—
Ava Max	1	"Sweet but Psycho"	1	—
Dalton Harris	1	"The Power of Love"	4	—
6ix9ine	1	"Kika"	9	—
Tory Lanez	1	"Kika"	9	—
LadBaby	1	"We Built This City"	1	—

Notes

Ina Wroldsen had previously had a top 10 entry as an uncredited artist when Calvin Harris and Disciples remixed a song she had written and sang on, "How Deep Is Your Love". The song went on to peak at number 2 in 2015. Macklemore joined forces with Rudimental, Jess Glynne and Dan Caplen for the number-one single "These Days". All his previous top 10 singles were alongside Ryan Lewis in the duo Macklemore & Ryan Lewis.

Along with Quavo and Takeoff, Offset is part of the collective Migos whose first top 10 credit came on Calvin Harris' hit single "Slide" in 2017. Benny Blanco took on a lead artist tag for the first time on "Eastside", with Halsey and Khalid providing vocals, after years of chart success as a songwriter (beginning with Katy Perry's "I Kissed a Girl" in 2008). The duo Silk City comprises producer Mark Ronson and DJ and record producer Diplo, who both had top 10 hits to their name, but were making their first appearance together on "Electricity".

=== Songs from films ===
Original songs from various films entered the top 10 throughout the year. These included "This Is Me" (from The Greatest Showman), "For You" (Fifty Shades Freed), "All the Stars" (Black Panther), "Shallow" (A Star Is Born and "Sunflower" (Spider-Man: Into the Spider-verse). "Shallow" was the only one of these singles to reach the number-one spot.

Additionally, "Rewrite the Stars" by Anne-Marie and James Arthur also entered the top 10 at number 8, however despite being from The Greatest Showman, this entry was part of The Greatest Showman: Reimagined soundtrack. The original version was sung by Zac Efron and Zendaya in the film.

=== Best-selling singles ===
Calvin Harris & Dua Lipa had the best-selling single of the year with "One Kiss". The song spent 12 weeks in the top 10 (including eight weeks at number-one), sold over 1,200,000 copies and was certified 2× platinum by the BPI. "God's Plan" by Drake came in second place, while George Ezra's "Shotgun", "This is Me" by Keala Settle and "These Days" from Rudimental featuring Jess Glynne, Macklemore & Dan Caplan made up the top five. Singles by Ed Sheeran, Drake ("Nice for What"), George Ezra ("Paradise"), Ariana Grande and Portugal. The Man were also in the top ten best-selling singles of the year.

== Top-ten singles ==
Key

Symbol	Meaning
‡	Single peaked in 2017 but still in chart in 2018.
♦	Single released in 2017 or 2018 but peaked in 2019.
(#)	Year-end top-ten single position and rank
Entered	The date that the single first appeared in the chart.
Peak	Highest position that the single reached in the UK Singles Chart.

Entered (week ending)	Weeks in top 10	Single	Artist	Peak	Peak reached (week ending)	Weeks at peak
Singles in 2017
21 September 2017	15	"Havana" ‡ ^{[A]}	Camila Cabello featuring Young Thug	1	9 November 2017	5
2 November 2017	14	"Perfect" ‡ (#6)	Ed Sheeran	1	14 December 2017	6
16 November 2017	11	"Anywhere" ‡	Rita Ora	2	23 November 2017	3
23 November 2017	9	"Man's Not Hot"	Big Shaq	3	11 January 2018	1
30 November 2017	3	"Wolves" ‡ ^{[B]}	Selena Gomez & Marshmello	9	30 November 2017	3
7 December 2017	7	"I Miss You" ^{[C]}	Clean Bandit featuring Julia Michaels	4	25 January 2018	1
7 December 2017	3	"17" ^{[D]}	MK	7	11 January 2018	1
14 December 2017	8	"All I Want for Christmas Is You" ‡ ^{[E]}	Mariah Carey	2	21 December 2017	2
14 December 2017	7	"Last Christmas" ^{[F]}	Wham!	2	4 January 2018	1
14 December 2017	6	"Fairytale of New York" ♦ ^{[G]}	The Pogues featuring Kirsty MacColl	4	3 January 2019	1
28 December 2017	9	"River"	Eminem featuring Ed Sheeran	1	25 January 2018	1
28 December 2017	4	"Let You Down" ^{[H]}	NF	6	18 January 2018	1
Singles in 2018
4 January 2018	1	"Do They Know It's Christmas?" ^{[I]}^{[J]}	Band Aid	7	4 January 2018	1
4 January 2018	1	"Rockin' Around the Christmas Tree" ^{[K]}	Brenda Lee	9	4 January 2018	1
4 January 2018	1	"Merry Christmas Everyone" ^{[L]}	Shakin' Stevens	10	4 January 2018	1
11 January 2018	8	"Barking"	Ramz	2	25 January 2018	3
18 January 2018	6	"Finesse"	Bruno Mars & Cardi B	5	25 January 2018	1
18 January 2018	4	"I Know You"	Craig David featuring Bastille	5	8 February 2018	1
25 January 2018	3	"Never Be the Same" ^{[M]}	Camila Cabello	7	25 January 2018	1
25 January 2018	4	"Tip Toe"	Jason Derulo featuring French Montana	5	1 February 2018	1
1 February 2018	10	"God's Plan" (#2)	Drake	1	1 February 2018	9
1 February 2018	9	"IDGAF"	Dua Lipa	3	1 March 2018	3
1 February 2018	13	"This Is Me" (#4)	Keala Settle & The Greatest Showman Ensemble	3	22 February 2018	2
1 February 2018	3	"Breathe" ^{[N]}	Jax Jones featuring Ina Wroldsen	7	8 February 2018	1
8 February 2018	1	"Strangers"	Sigrid	10	8 February 2018	1
15 February 2018	11	"These Days" (#5)	Rudimental featuring Jess Glynne, Macklemore & Dan Caplen	1	5 April 2018	1
15 February 2018	11	"Feel It Still" (#10)	Portugal. The Man	3	22 March 2018	3
22 February 2018	4	"For You"	Liam Payne & Rita Ora	8	22 February 2018	2
1 March 2018	5	"All the Stars"	Kendrick Lamar & SZA	5	1 March 2018	1
1 March 2018	9	"Friends"	Marshmello & Anne-Marie	4	22 March 2018	3
8 March 2018	11	"Psycho"	Post Malone featuring Ty Dolla Sign	4	8 March 2018	1
8 March 2018	3	"Say Something"	Justin Timberlake featuring Chris Stapleton	9	15 March 2018	2
22 March 2018	5	"The Middle" ^{[O]}	Zedd, Maren Morris & Grey	7	5 April 2018	1
29 March 2018	11	"Paradise" (#8)	George Ezra	2	5 April 2018	1
5 April 2018	8	"Freaky Friday"	Lil Dicky featuring Chris Brown	1	12 April 2018	1
5 April 2018	7	"Lullaby"	Sigala & Paloma Faith	6	26 April 2018	1
12 April 2018	1	"Call Out My Name"	The Weeknd	7	12 April 2018	1
19 April 2018	9	"Nice for What" (#7)	Drake	1	19 April 2018	1
19 April 2018	12	"One Kiss" (#1)	Calvin Harris & Dua Lipa	1	26 April 2018	8
3 May 2018	9	"No Tears Left to Cry" (#9)	Ariana Grande	2	3 May 2018	2
3 May 2018	6	"Answerphone"	Banx & Ranx & Ella Eyre featuring Yxng Bane	5	31 May 2018	1
3 May 2018	12	"2002"	Anne-Marie	3	7 June 2018	5
10 May 2018	8	"Better Now" ^{[P]}	Post Malone	6	21 June 2018	2
24 May 2018	2	"This Is America"	Childish Gambino	6	24 May 2018	1
24 May 2018	5	"Flames"	David Guetta & Sia	7	31 May 2018	1
24 May 2018	1	"In My Blood"	Shawn Mendes	10	24 May 2018	1
31 May 2018	7	"I'll Be There"	Jess Glynne	1	21 June 2018	1
7 June 2018	8	"Solo"	Clean Bandit featuring Demi Lovato	1	28 June 2018	1
14 June 2018	16	"Shotgun" (#3) ^{[Q]}	George Ezra	1	5 July 2018	4
14 June 2018	1	"Yikes"	Kanye West	10	14 June 2018	1
21 June 2018	3	"Leave a Light On" ^{[R]}	Tom Walker	7	28 June 2018	1
21 June 2018	7	"I Like It" ^{[S]}	Cardi B, Bad Bunny & J Balvin	8	5 July 2018	2
28 June 2018	7	"If You're Over Me"	Years & Years	6	5 July 2018	3
5 July 2018	1	"Sad!" ^{[T]}	XXXTentacion	5	5 July 2018	1
12 July 2018	4	"Don't Matter to Me"	Drake featuring Michael Jackson	2	12 July 2018	1
12 July 2018	1	"Nonstop"	Drake	4	12 July 2018	1
12 July 2018	1	"Emotionless"	Drake	5	12 July 2018	1
12 July 2018	12	"Girls Like You"	Maroon 5 featuring Cardi B	7	26 July 2018	4
19 July 2018	1	"Three Lions" ^{[U]}^{[V]}	Baddiel, Skinner & The Lightning Seeds	1	19 July 2018	1
19 July 2018	9	"In My Feelings"	Drake	1	26 July 2018	4
19 July 2018	6	"Rise"	Jonas Blue featuring Jack & Jack	3	2 August 2018	2
26 July 2018	5	"God Is a Woman" ^{[W]}	Ariana Grande	4	26 July 2018	1
26 July 2018	5	"Youngblood"	5 Seconds of Summer	4	2 August 2018	1
26 July 2018	5	"Jackie Chan"	Tiësto & Dzeko featuring Preme & Post Malone	5	2 August 2018	1
9 August 2018	5	"No Brainer"	DJ Khaled featuring Justin Bieber, Chance the Rapper & Quavo	3	16 August 2018	2
16 August 2018	8	"Body"	Loud Luxury featuring Brando	4	20 September 2018	2
16 August 2018	1	"Sicko Mode"	Travis Scott	9	16 August 2018	1
16 August 2018	8	"Taste"	Tyga featuring Offset	5	20 September 2018	1
23 August 2018	8	"Eastside"	Benny Blanco, Halsey & Khalid	1	6 September 2018	1
30 August 2018	12	"Promises"	Calvin Harris & Sam Smith	1	13 September 2018	6
30 August 2018	1	"Breathin"	Ariana Grande	8	30 August 2018	1
6 September 2018	1	"Lucid Dreams"	Juice Wrld	10	6 September 2018	1
13 September 2018	2	"The Ringer"	Eminem	4	13 September 2018	1
13 September 2018	3	"Lucky You"	Eminem featuring Joyner Lucas	6	13 September 2018	1
13 September 2018	2	"Fall"	Eminem	8	20 September 2018	1
20 September 2018	6	"I Love It"	Kanye West & Lil Pump	3	20 September 2018	4
20 September 2018	8	"Happier"	Marshmello & Bastille	2	11 October 2018	1
27 September 2018	7	"In My Mind"	Dynoro & Gigi D'Agostino	5	11 October 2018	1
27 September 2018	7	"Electricity"	Silk City & Dua Lipa	4	11 October 2018	1
4 October 2018	4	"All I Am"	Jess Glynne	7	11 October 2018	1
4 October 2018	1	"Falling Down"	Lil Peep & XXXTentacion	10	4 October 2018	1
11 October 2018	8	"Let You Love Me"	Rita Ora	4	22 November 2018	1
11 October 2018	7	"Lost Without You" ^{[X]}	Freya Ridings	9	11 October 2018	5
18 October 2018	8	"Funky Friday"	Dave featuring Fredo	1	18 October 2018	1
18 October 2018	8	"Shallow"	Lady Gaga & Bradley Cooper	1	1 November 2018	2
25 October 2018	9	"Woman Like Me"	Little Mix featuring Nicki Minaj	2	8 November 2018	3
1 November 2018	13	"Sunflower" ♦ ^{[Y]}	Post Malone & Swae Lee	3	10 January 2019	1
1 November 2018	7	"Zeze"	Kodak Black featuring Travis Scott & Offset	7	8 November 2018	1
15 November 2018	12	"Thank U, Next"	Ariana Grande	1	15 November 2018	6
15 November 2018	7	"Thursday"	Jess Glynne	3	6 December 2018	1
15 November 2018	9	"Without Me"	Halsey	3	13 December 2018	2
6 December 2018	12	"Sweet but Psycho" ♦	Ava Max	1	3 January 2019	4
13 December 2018	1	"The Power of Love"	Dalton Harris featuring James Arthur	4	13 December 2018	1
13 December 2018	3	"Rewrite the Stars" ♦	James Arthur & Anne-Marie	7	17 January 2019	1
13 December 2018	1	"Kika"	6ix9ine featuring Tory Lanez	9	13 December 2018	1
13 December 2018	10	"Nothing Breaks Like a Heart" ♦	Mark Ronson featuring Miley Cyrus	2	24 January 2019	1
27 December 2018	1	"We Built This City"	LadBaby	1	27 December 2018	1
27 December 2018	1	"Imagine"	Ariana Grande	8	27 December 2018	1

== Entries by artist ==
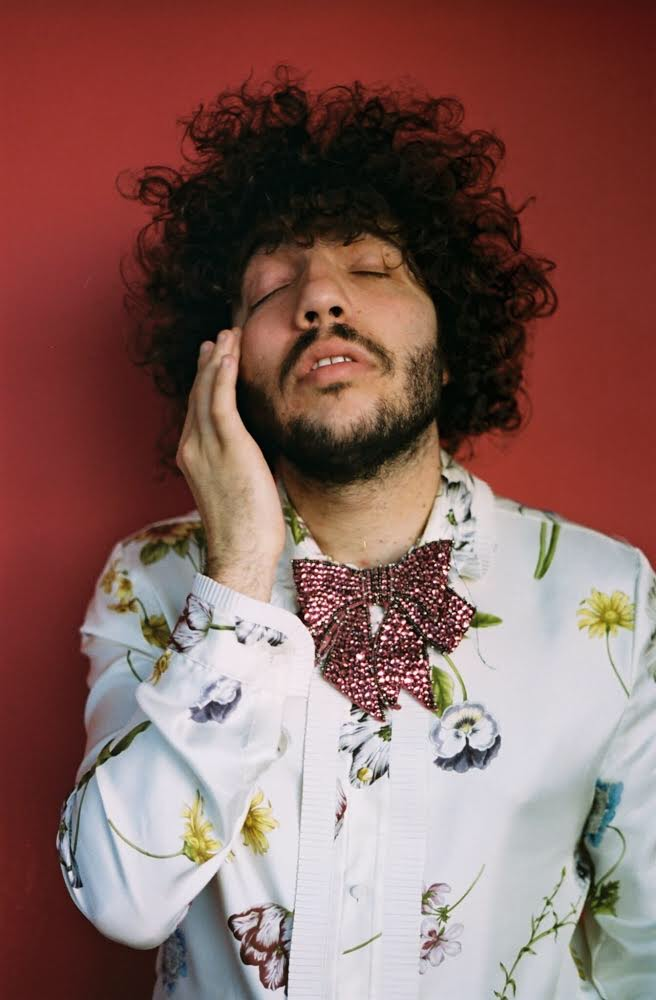
US record producer and songwriter Benny Blanco teamed up with American singers Halsey and Khalid for the hit single "Eastside", which entered the UK top 10 in August of this year and spent a week at number-one.

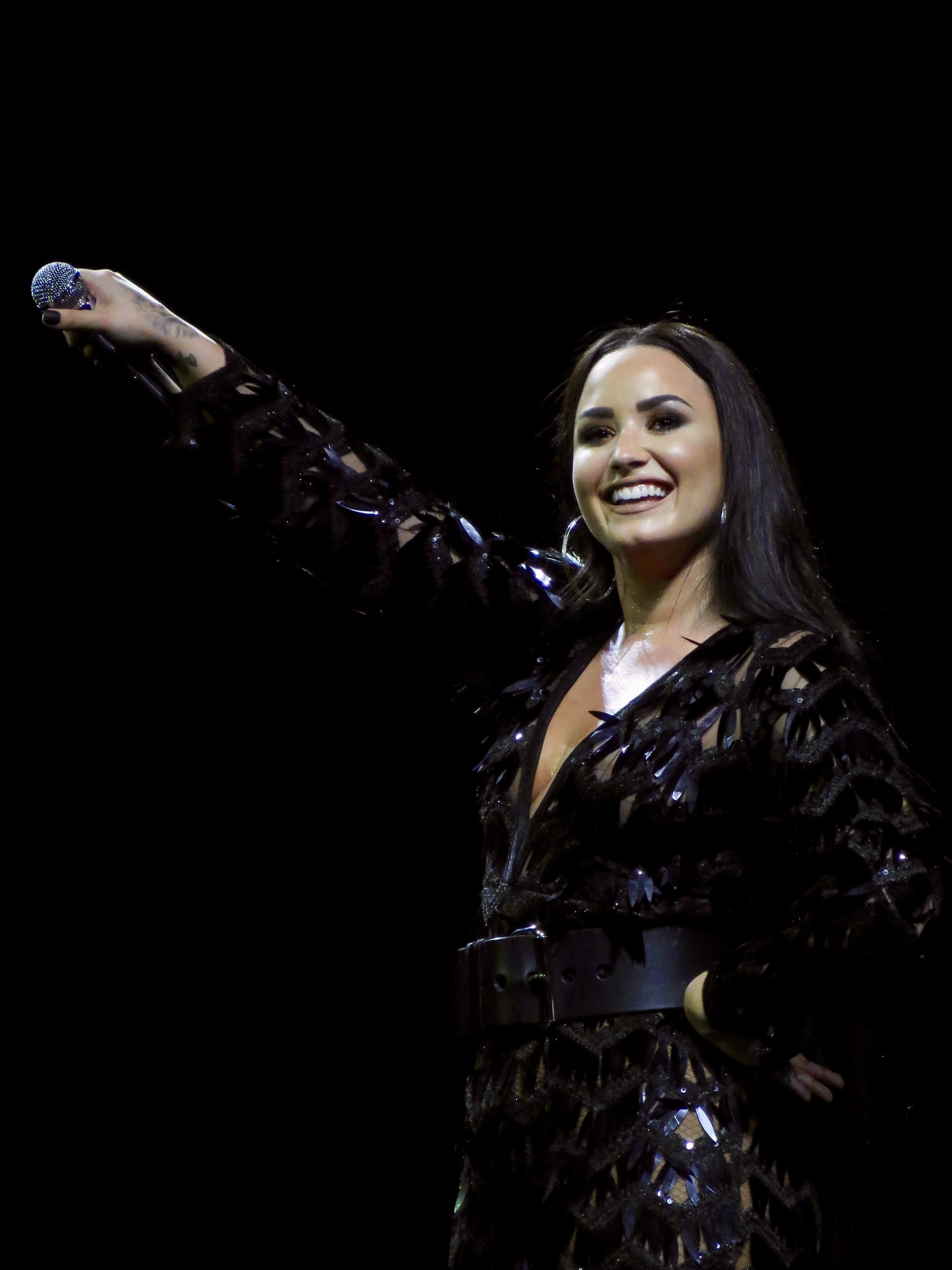
Demi Lovato achieved her first UK number-one single in June 2018 after providing vocals on Clean Bandit's "Solo", which lasted eight weeks in the top 10.

The following table shows artists who have achieved two or more top 10 entries in 2018, including singles that reached their peak in 2017. The figures include both main artists and featured artists, while appearances on ensemble charity records are also counted for each artist. The total number of weeks an artist spent in the top ten in 2018 is also shown.

Entries	Artist	Weeks	Singles
6
6	Drake	29	"Don't Matter to Me", "Emotionless", "God's Plan", "In My Feelings", "Nice for What", "Nonstop"
5	Ariana Grande	22	"Breathin", "God Is a Woman", "Imagine", "No Tears Left to Cry", "Thank U, Next"
4	Jess Glynne ^{[Z]}	27	"All I Am", "I'll Be There", "These Days", "Thursday"
4	Eminem	10	"Fall", "Lucky You", "River", "The Ringer",
4	Post Malone ^{[AA]}^{[BB]}	31	"Better Now", "Jackie Chan", "Psycho", "Sunflower"
3	Cardi B ^{[CC]}	21	"Finesse", "Girls Like You", "I Like It",
3	Marshmello ^{[DD]}	16	"Friends", "Happier", "Wolves",
3	Dua Lipa	28	"Electricity", "IDGAF", "One Kiss",
3	Rita Ora ^{[DD]}	18	"Anywhere", "For You", "Let You Love Me"
3	Anne-Marie	22	"2002", "Friends", "Rewrite the Stars"
2	Camila Cabello ^{[DD]}	4	"Havana", "Never Be the Same"
2	Ed Sheeran ^{[DD]}^{[EE]}	7	"Perfect", "River"
2	George Ezra	26	"Paradise", "Shotgun"
2	Clean Bandit	11	"I Miss You", "Solo"
2	Bastille ^{[FF]}	12	"Happier", "I Know You",
2	George Michael ^{[GG]}^{[HH]}^{[II]}	4	"Do They Know It's Christmas?", "Last Christmas"
2	Calvin Harris	24	"One Kiss", "Promises"
2	James Arthur	1	"Rewrite the Stars", "The Power of Love",
2	Mark Ronson ^{[JJ]}	10	"Electricity", "Nothing Breaks Like a Heart"
2	Kanye West	7	"I Love It", "Yikes",
2	XXXTentacion	2	"Falling Down", "Sad!"
2	Travis Scott	7	"Sicko Mode, "Zeze"
2	Offset ^{[KK]}^{[LL]}	14	"Taste, "Zeze"
2	Halsey	15	"Eastside", "Without Me"

== Notes ==
- ^{a} "Havana" re-entered the top 10 at number 5 on 11 January 2018 (week ending).
- ^{b} "Wolves re-entered the top 10 at number 9 on 11 January 2018 (week ending).
- ^{c} "I Miss You re-entered the top 10 at number 6 on 11 January 2018 (week ending).
- ^{d} "17" re-entered the top 10 on 11 January (week ending) at number 7, having originally peaked at number 10 in 2017.
- ^{e} "All I Want for Christmas" re-entered the top 10 on 14 December 2017 (week ending), having originally peaked at number 2 upon release in 1994. It also re-entered the top 10 at number 6 on 13 December 2018 (week ending).
- ^{f} "Last Christmas" re-entered the top 10 on 14 December 2017 (week ending), having originally peaked at number 2 upon release in 1984. It also re-entered the top 10 at number 7 on 20 December 2018 (week ending).
- ^{g} "Fairytale of New York" re-entered the top 10 on 14 December 2017 (week ending), having originally peaked at number 2 upon release in 1987. It also re-entered the top 10 at number 10 on 20 December 2018 (week ending) and at number 4 on 3 January 2019 (week ending).
- ^{h} "Let You Down" re-entered the top 10 at number 10 on 11 January 2018 (week ending).
- ^{i} Released as a charity single by Band Aid in 1984 to aid famine relief in Ethiopia.
- ^{j} "Do They Know It's Christmas?" re-entered the top 10 on 4 January 2018 (week ending), having originally peaked at number 1 upon release in 1984.
- ^{k} "Rockin' Around the Christmas Tree" re-entered the top 10 on 4 January 2018 (week ending), having originally peaked at number 6 upon release in 1962.
- ^{l} "Merry Christmas Everyone" re-entered the top 10 on 4 January 2018 (week ending), having originally peaked at number 1 upon release in 1985.
- ^{m} "Never Be the Same" re-entered the top 10 at number 10 on 15 February 2018 (week ending) and at number 10 on 1 March 2018 (week ending) following a performance on Dancing on Ice.
- ^{n} "Breathe" re-entered the top 10 at number 10 on 22 February 2018 (week ending).
- ^{o} "The Middle" re-entered the top 10 at number 9 on 4 May 2018 (week ending).
- ^{p} "Better Now" re-entered the top 10 at number 10 on 31 May 2018 (week ending).
- ^{q} "Shotgun" re-entered the top 10 at number 10 on 11 October 2018 (week ending), following a performance on Strictly Come Dancing.
- ^{r} “Leave a Light On” was used by Sony in television adverts for their Bravia OLED TV range.
- ^{s} "I Like It" re-entered the top 10 at number 8 on 2 August 2018 (week ending).
- ^{t} "Sad!" reached the top 10 for the first time following the death of XXXTentacion. It originally peaked at number 19 in March 2018.
- ^{u} "Three Lions" originally peaked at number-one upon its initial release in 1996. It had further spells in the top 10 in 2006 and 2010.
- ^{v} "Three Lions" peaked at number-one again in 2018 following England’s progress to the semi-finals of the 2018 FIFA World Cup. It was announced as a number-one single two days after the team had been knocked out of the tournament by Croatia.
- ^{w} "God Is a Woman" re-entered the top 10 at number 6 on 30 August 2018 (week ending), following the release of the album, Sweetener.
- ^{x} "Lost Without You" re-entered the top 10 at number 9 on 8 November 2018 (week ending), following a performance on Stand Up to Cancer. It also re-entered the top 10 at number 9 on 22 November 2018 (week ending).
- ^{y} "Sunflower" re-entered the top 10 at number 10 on 15 November 2018 (week ending) and at number 9 on 20 December 2018 (week ending).
- ^{z} Figure includes appearance on Rudimental's "These Days".
- ^{aa} Figure includes appearance on Tiësto & Dzeko's "Jackie Chan".
- ^{bb} Figure includes single that peaked in 2019.
- ^{cc} Figure includes appearance on Maroon 5's "Girls Like You".
- ^{dd} Figure includes single that peaked in 2017.
- ^{ee} Figure includes appearance on Eminem's "River".
- ^{ff} Figure includes appearance on Craig David's "I Know You".
- ^{gg} Figure includes an appearance on the "Do They Know It's Christmas?" charity single by Band Aid.
- ^{hh} Figure includes a top-ten hit with the group Wham!.
- ^{ii} Figure includes single that first charted in 2017 but peaked in 2018.
- ^{jj} Figure includes a top-ten hit with the group Silk City.
- ^{kk} Figure includes appearance on Tyga's "Taste".
- ^{ll} Figure includes appearance on Kodak Black's "Zeze".

== See also ==
- 2018 in British music
- List of number-one singles from the 2010s (UK)
