= List of number-one singles of 2018 (Slovenia) =

SloTop50 singles 2018
Winners
- Most weeks at No. 1: "Perfect", "One Kiss"
- Year End No. 1: "Perfect"

List of the Slovenian number-one singles of 2018 compiled by SloTop50, is the official chart provider of Slovenia. SloTop50 publishes weekly charts once a week, every Sunday. Chart contain data generated by the SloTop50 system according to any song played during the period starting the previous Monday morning at time 00:00:00 and ending Sunday night at 23:59:59.

== Charts ==
=== Number-one singles by week ===
Weekly charted #1 songs and highest charted counting among domestic songs only

| † | Indicates best-performing single of 2018 |

| No. | Week | Issue date | Number one | Artist | Top domestic song | Top domestic artist |
|---|---|---|---|---|---|---|
| re | 262 | 7 January 2018 | "Perfect" † | Ed Sheeran | "Ni predaje, ni umika" | BQL & Nika Zorjan |
| re | 263 | 14 January 2018 | "Perfect" † | Ed Sheeran | "Ni predaje, ni umika" | BQL & Nika Zorjan |
| re | 264 | 21 January 2018 | "Perfect" † | Ed Sheeran | "Ni predaje, ni umika" | BQL & Nika Zorjan |
| re | 265 | 28 January 2018 | "Perfect" † | Ed Sheeran | "Ni predaje, ni umika" | BQL & Nika Zorjan |
| re | 266 | 4 February 2018 | "Perfect" † | Ed Sheeran | "Spet te slišim" | Lamai |
| re | 267 | 11 February 2018 | "Perfect" † | Ed Sheeran | "Spet te slišim" | Lamai |
| re | 268 | 18 February 2018 | "Perfect" † | Ed Sheeran | "Ni predaje, ni umika" | BQL & Nika Zorjan |
| re | 269 | 25 February 2018 | "Perfect" † | Ed Sheeran | "Ni predaje, ni umika" | BQL & Nika Zorjan |
| re | 270 | 4 March 2018 | "Perfect" † | Ed Sheeran | "Promise" | BQL |
| re | 271 | 11 March 2018 | "Perfect" † | Ed Sheeran | "Uspavanka-Lullaby" | Nika Zorjan |
| re | 272 | 18 March 2018 | "Perfect" † | Ed Sheeran | "Ptica" | BQL |
| 64 | 273 | 25 March 2018 | "Échame la Culpa" | Luis Fonsi and Demi Lovato | "Ptica" | BQL |
| 64 | 274 | 1 April 2018 | "Échame la Culpa" | Luis Fonsi and Demi Lovato | "Ptica" | BQL |
| 64 | 275 | 8 April 2018 | "Échame la Culpa" | Luis Fonsi and Demi Lovato | "Ptica" | BQL |
| 64 | 276 | 15 April 2018 | "Échame la Culpa" | Luis Fonsi and Demi Lovato | "Ptica" | BQL |
| 64 | 277 | 22 April 2018 | "Échame la Culpa" | Luis Fonsi and Demi Lovato | "Ptica" | BQL |
| 64 | 278 | 29 April 2018 | "Échame la Culpa" | Luis Fonsi and Demi Lovato | "Ptica" | BQL |
| 64 | 279 | 6 May 2018 | "Échame la Culpa" | Luis Fonsi and Demi Lovato | "Ptica" | BQL |
| 65 | 280 | 13 May 2018 | "Say Something" | Justin Timberlake ft. Chris Stapleton | "Hvala, ne!" | Lea Sirk |
| re | 281 | 20 May 2018 | Échame la Culpa" | Luis Fonsi and Demi Lovato | "Velik je ta svet" | Jan Plestenjak ft. Salle |
| 66 | 282 | 27 May 2018 | "These Days" | Rudimental ft. Glynne, Macklemore & Caplen | "Dobro jutro življenje" | Alya |
| 66 | 283 | 3 June 2018 | "These Days" | Rudimental ft. Glynne, Macklemore & Caplen | "Velik je ta svet" | Jan Plestenjak ft. Salle |
| 67 | 284 | 10 June 2018 | "Flames" | David Guetta and Sia | "Velik je ta svet" | Jan Plestenjak ft. Salle |
| 67 | 285 | 17 June 2018 | "Flames" | David Guetta and Sia | "Velik je ta svet" | Jan Plestenjak ft. Salle |
| 67 | 286 | 24 June 2018 | "Flames" | David Guetta and Sia | "Velik je ta svet" | Jan Plestenjak ft. Salle |
| 68 | 287 | 1 July 2018 | "One Kiss" | Calvin Harris ft. Dua Lipa | "Luna" | Nika Zorjan ft. J. Haller |
| 69 | 288 | 8 July 2018 | "La Cintura" | Álvaro Soler | "Luna" | Nika Zorjan ft. J. Haller |
| re | 289 | 15 July 2018 | "One Kiss" | Calvin Harris ft. Dua Lipa | "Luna" | Nika Zorjan ft. J. Haller |
| re | 290 | 22 July 2018 | "One Kiss" | Calvin Harris ft. Dua Lipa | "Luna" | Nika Zorjan ft. J. Haller |
| re | 291 | 29 July 2018 | "One Kiss" | Calvin Harris ft. Dua Lipa | "Luna" | Nika Zorjan ft. J. Haller |
| re | 292 | 5 August 2018 | "One Kiss" | Calvin Harris ft. Dua Lipa | "Vroče" | S.I.T. |
| re | 293 | 12 August 2018 | "One Kiss" | Calvin Harris ft. Dua Lipa | "Luna" | Nika Zorjan ft. J. Haller |
| re | 294 | 19 August 2018 | "La Cintura" | Álvaro Soler | "Luna" | Nika Zorjan ft. J. Haller |
| re | 295 | 26 August 2018 | "One Kiss" | Calvin Harris ft. Dua Lipa | "Luna" | Nika Zorjan ft. J. Haller |
| re | 296 | 2 September 2018 | "One Kiss" | Calvin Harris ft. Dua Lipa | "Vroče" | S.I.T. |
| re | 297 | 9 September 2018 | "One Kiss" | Calvin Harris ft. Dua Lipa | "Luna" | Nika Zorjan ft. J. Haller |
| re | 298 | 16 September 2018 | "One Kiss" | Calvin Harris ft. Dua Lipa | "Luna" | Nika Zorjan ft. J. Haller |
| re | 299 | 23 September 2018 | "One Kiss" | Calvin Harris ft. Dua Lipa | "Luna" | Nika Zorjan ft. J. Haller |
| 70 | 300 | 30 September 2018 | "Solo" | Clean Bandit ft. Demi Lovato | "Povej mi, kaj bi rada" | Jan Plestenjak |
| 70 | 301 | 7 October 2018 | "Solo" | Clean Bandit ft. Demi Lovato | "Povej mi, kaj bi rada" | Jan Plestenjak |
| 71 | 302 | 14 October 2018 | "Promises" | Calvin Harris ft. Sam Smith | "Luna" | Nika Zorjan ft. J. Haller |
| 71 | 303 | 21 October 2018 | "Promises" | Calvin Harris ft. Sam Smith | "Luna" | Nika Zorjan ft. J. Haller |
| 71 | 304 | 28 October 2018 | "Promises" | Calvin Harris ft. Sam Smith | "Luna" | Nika Zorjan ft. J. Haller |
| 71 | 305 | 4 November 2018 | "Promises" | Calvin Harris ft. Sam Smith | "Luna" | Nika Zorjan ft. J. Haller |
| 71 | 306 | 11 November 2018 | "Promises" | Calvin Harris ft. Sam Smith | "Luna" | Nika Zorjan ft. J. Haller |
| 71 | 307 | 18 November 2018 | "Promises" | Calvin Harris ft. Sam Smith | "Luna" | Nika Zorjan ft. J. Haller |
| 71 | 308 | 25. November 2018 | "Promises" | Calvin Harris ft. Sam Smith | "Vroče" | S.I.T. |
| 72 | 309 | 2 December 2018 | "In My Mind" | Dynoro ft. Gigi D'Agostino | "Za naju" | Nina Pušlar |
| 72 | 310 | 9 December 2018 | "In My Mind" | Dynoro ft. Gigi D'Agostino | "Peru" | BQL |
| 72 | 311 | 16 December 2018 | "In My Mind" | Dynoro ft. Gigi D'Agostino | "Peru" | BQL |
| 72 | 312 | 23 December 2018 | "In My Mind" | Dynoro ft. Gigi D'Agostino | "Peru" | BQL |
| re | 313 | 30 December 2018 | "Promises" | Calvin Harris ft. Sam Smith | "Peru" | BQL |

=== Number-one singles by month ===
Monthly charted #1 songs and highest charted counting among domestic songs only

| No. | Month | Issue date | Number-one | Artist | Top domestic song | Top domestic artist |
|---|---|---|---|---|---|---|
| 37 | 61 | January 2018 | "Perfect" | Ed Sheeran | "Ni predaje, ni umika" | BQL & Nika Zorjan |
| 37 | 62 | February 2018 | "Perfect" | Ed Sheeran | "Ni predaje, ni umika" | BQL & Nika Zorjan |
| 37 | 63 | March 2018 | "Perfect" | Ed Sheeran | "Uspavanka-Lullaby" | Nika Zorjan |
| 38 | 64 | April 2018 | "Échame la Culpa" | Luis Fonsi and Demi Lovato | "Ptica" | BQL |
| 39 | 65 | May 2018 | "These Days" | Rudimental ft. Glynne, Macklem. & Caplen | "Velik je ta svet" | Jan Plestenjak ft. Salle |
| 40 | 66 | June 2018 | "Flames" | David Guetta ft. Sia | "Velik je ta svet" | Jan Plestenjak ft. Salle |
| 41 | 67 | July 2018 | "One Kiss" | Calvin Harris ft. Dua Lipa | "Luna" | Nika Zorjan ft. J. Haller |
| 41 | 68 | August 2018 | "One Kiss" | Calvin Harris ft. Dua Lipa | "Luna" | Nika Zorjan ft. J. Haller |
| 41 | 69 | September 2018 | "One Kiss" | Calvin Harris ft. Dua Lipa | "Luna" | Nika Zorjan ft. J. Haller |
| 41 | 70 | October 2018 | "One Kiss" | Calvin Harris ft. Dua Lipa | "Povej mi, kaj bi rada" | Jan Plestenjak |
| 42 | 71 | November 2018 | "Promises" | Calvin Harris ft. Sam Smith | "Luna" | Nika Zorjan ft. J. Haller |
| 43 | 72 | December 2018 | "In My Mind" | Dynoro ft. Gigi D'Agostino | "Peru" | BQL |
