= List of number-one singles of 2018 (Ireland) =

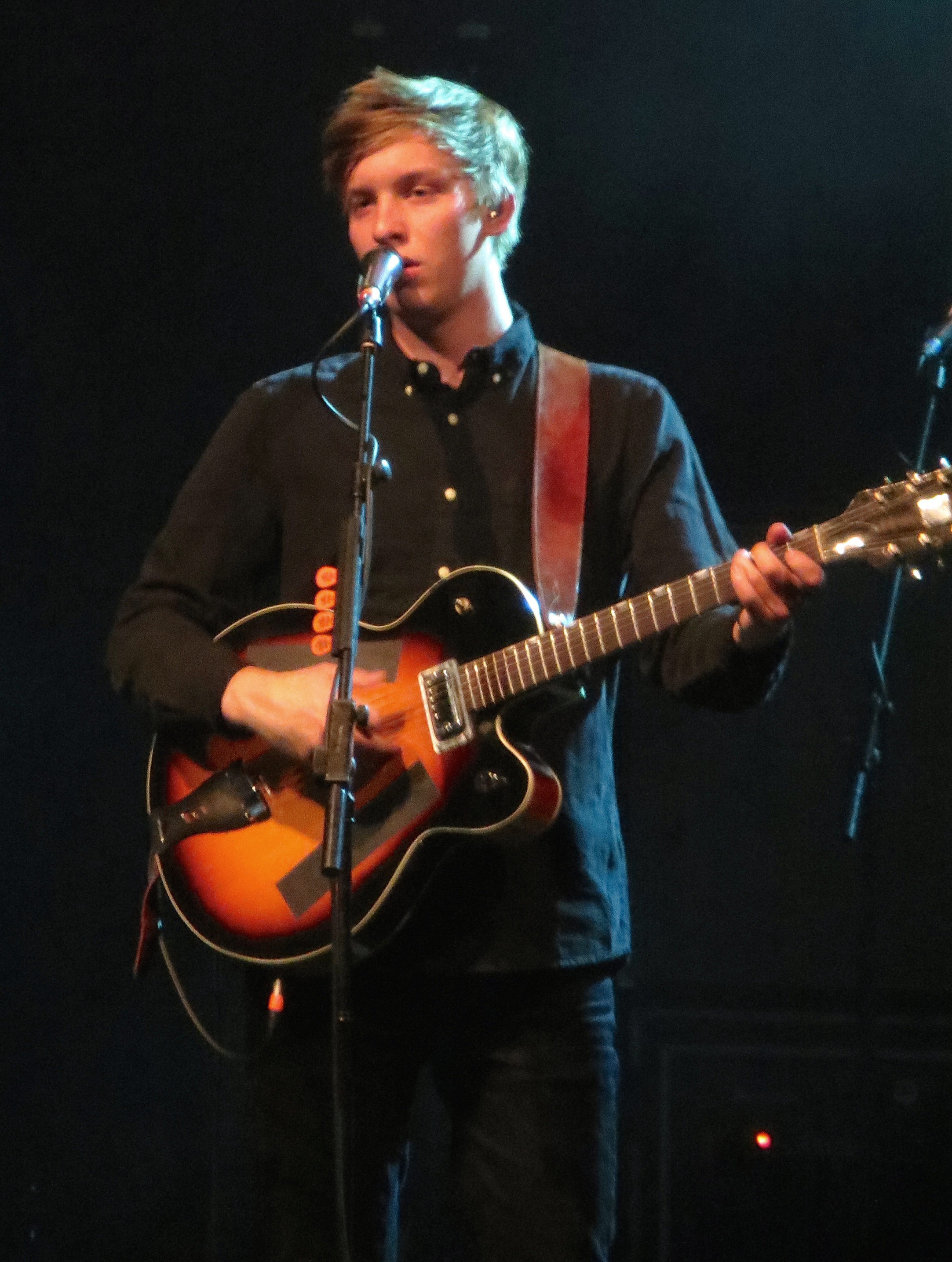
George Ezra's first number one hit, Shotgun, stayed at the top of the chart for nine consecutive weeks.

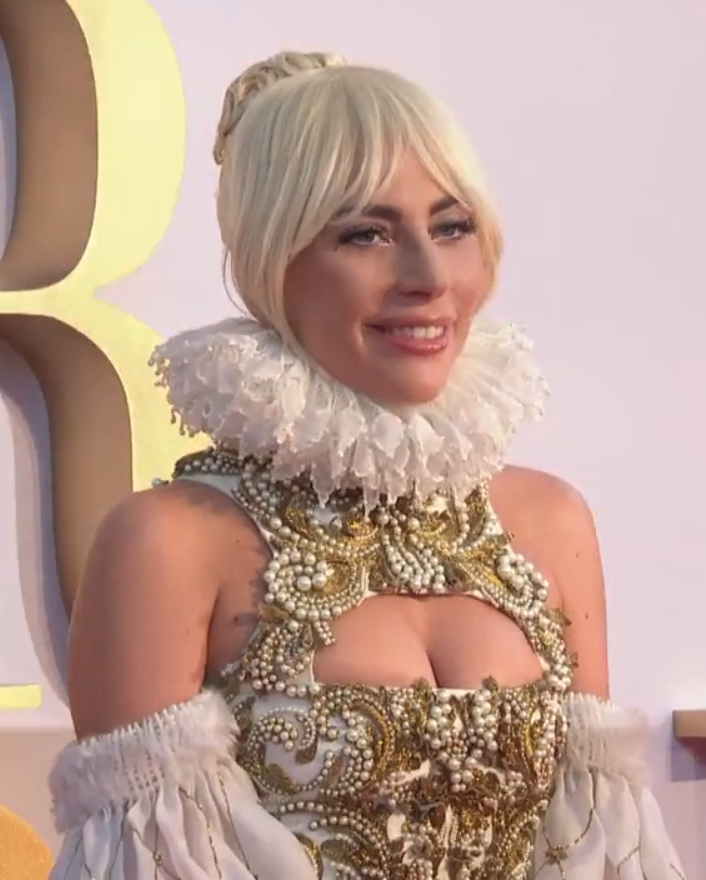
Lady Gaga gained her first number one in seven years when Shallow hit the top spot.

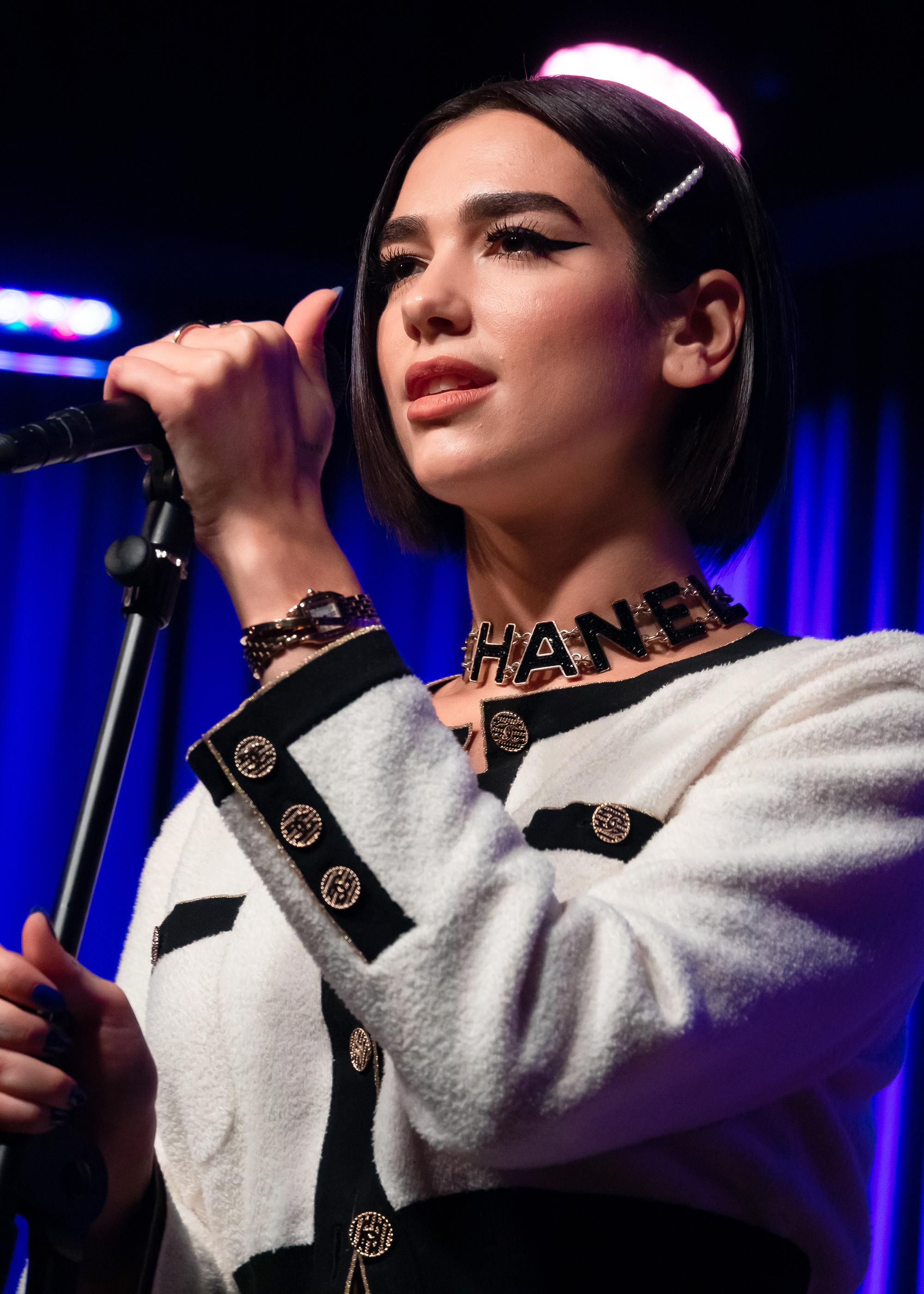
Dua Lipa hit number one twice with IDGAF and One Kiss, a collaboration with Calvin Harris.

The Irish Singles Chart ranks the best-performing singles in Ireland, as compiled by the Official Charts Company on behalf of the Irish Recorded Music Association.

Issue date	Song	Artist(s)	Reference
5 January	"Perfect"	Ed Sheeran	
12 January	"Perfect"	Ed Sheeran	
19 January	"Perfect"	Ed Sheeran	
26 January	"IDGAF"	Dua Lipa	
2 February	"God's Plan"	Drake	
9 February	"God's Plan"	Drake	
16 February	"God's Plan"	Drake	
23 February	"God's Plan"	Drake	
2 March	"God's Plan"	Drake	
9 March	"God's Plan"	Drake	
16 March	"God's Plan"	Drake	
23 March	"God's Plan"	Drake	
30 March	"God's Plan"	Drake	
6 April	"God's Plan"	Drake	
13 April	"One Kiss"	Calvin Harris and Dua Lipa	
20 April	"One Kiss"	Calvin Harris and Dua Lipa	
27 April	"No Tears Left to Cry"	Ariana Grande	
4 May	"One Kiss"	Calvin Harris and Dua Lipa	
11 May	"One Kiss"	Calvin Harris and Dua Lipa	
18 May	"One Kiss"	Calvin Harris and Dua Lipa	
25 May	"One Kiss"	Calvin Harris and Dua Lipa	
1 June	"One Kiss"	Calvin Harris and Dua Lipa	
8 June	"One Kiss"	Calvin Harris and Dua Lipa	
15 June	"One Kiss"	Calvin Harris and Dua Lipa	
22 June	"Solo"	Clean Bandit featuring Demi Lovato	
29 June	"Shotgun"	George Ezra	
6 July	"Shotgun"	George Ezra	
13 July	"Shotgun"	George Ezra	
20 July	"Shotgun"	George Ezra	
27 July	"Shotgun"	George Ezra	
3 August	"Shotgun"	George Ezra	
10 August	"Shotgun"	George Ezra	
17 August	"Shotgun"	George Ezra	
24 August	"Shotgun"	George Ezra	
31 August	"Eastside"	Benny Blanco, Halsey and Khalid	
7 September	"Promises"	Calvin Harris and Sam Smith	
14 September	"Promises"	Calvin Harris and Sam Smith	
21 September	"Promises"	Calvin Harris and Sam Smith	
28 September	"Promises"	Calvin Harris and Sam Smith	
5 October	"Promises"	Calvin Harris and Sam Smith	
12 October	"Shallow"	Lady Gaga and Bradley Cooper	
19 October	"Shallow"	Lady Gaga and Bradley Cooper	
26 October	"Shallow"	Lady Gaga and Bradley Cooper	
2 November	"Shallow"	Lady Gaga and Bradley Cooper	
9 November	"Thank U, Next"	Ariana Grande	
16 November	"Thank U, Next"	Ariana Grande	
23 November	"Thank U, Next"	Ariana Grande	
30 November	"Thank U, Next"	Ariana Grande	
7 December	"Thank U, Next"	Ariana Grande	
14 December	"Thank U, Next"	Ariana Grande	
21 December	"Sweet but Psycho"	Ava Max	
28 December	"Sweet but Psycho"	Ava Max	

== Number-one artists ==
Position	Artist	Weeks at No. 1
1	Calvin Harris	14
2	Drake	10
2	Dua Lipa	10
4	George Ezra	9
5	Ariana Grande	7
6	Sam Smith	5
7	Lady Gaga	4
7	Bradley Cooper	4
9	Ed Sheeran	3
10	Ava Max	2
11	Clean Bandit	1
11	Demi Lovato	1
11	Benny Blanco	1
11	Halsey	1
11	Khalid	1
