= One Kiss =

2018 single by Calvin Harris and Dua Lipa

Single by Calvin Harris and Dua Lipa
- Released: 6 April 2018
- Recorded: January 2018
- Studio: God's Eyes (Los Angeles)
- Genre: Dance-pop; diva house; tropical house
- Length: 3:34
- Label: Columbia; Sony
- Songwriters: Adam Wiles; Jessie Reyez; Dua Lipa
- Producer: Calvin Harris

Calvin Harris singles chronology
| "Nuh Ready Nuh Ready" (2018) | "One Kiss" (2018) | "Promises" (2018) |

Dua Lipa singles chronology
| "IDGAF" (2018) | "One Kiss" (2018) | "Electricity" (2018) |

Music video
- "One Kiss" on YouTube

"One Kiss" is a song by Scottish DJ and record producer Calvin Harris and English singer Dua Lipa. The song was released for digital download and streaming as a standalone single, through Columbia Records and Sony Music on 6 April 2018. It was later included on Dua Lipa: Complete Edition (2018), the super deluxe reissue of Lipa's eponymous debut studio album, and on Harris' seventh studio album, 96 Months (2024). The song was written by Harris and Lipa alongside Canadian singer Jessie Reyez, with Harris solely handling the production. It is a dance-pop, diva house and tropical house song with 1990s, electro house, Eurodance, funky disco, funk house, psychedelic electropop and UK garage elements. Horns, organs, and a synth-line are featured within the song, as well as house beats. Lyrically, the song is about instantly falling in love with a romantic interest after a kiss.

Music critics praised the throwback sound of "One Kiss" as well as its summertime aesthetic. The song won the Brit Award for British Single of the Year at the 2019 Brit Awards. It appeared on year-end lists by numerous publications including Billboard, The Guardian and Time Out. The song spent eight weeks atop the UK Singles Chart, standing as both's longest running number one single in the country. It further peaked in the same spot of charts in 32 other countries, including Germany, Ireland and the Netherlands. The song has since been certified multi-platinum in 13 countries, including Diamond in France, Mexico, and Poland, as well as a quintuple platinum in the UK. It was the biggest song of 2018 in the UK, as well as in the Netherlands and in the Flanders region of Belgium.

An accompanying music video was directed by Emil Nava and released in May 2018. The video features Lipa in front of a green screen that shows many settings, including a pool where Harris appears as the singer's waiter. The visual received praise from critics, who highlighted the aesthetics and costumes. Harris and Lipa promoted "One Kiss" with several live performances, including ones for The Graham Norton Show, the 61st Annual Grammy Awards, and the 2019 Brit Awards. Several remixes of the song have been released, including ones by Jauz, Oliver Heldens, and R3hab.The song also stands as one of the most streamed songs on Spotify with over 2 billion streams.

== Background and release ==
Calvin Harris and Dua Lipa first met at a party, shortly after Lipa released her single "Be the One" (2015). Two years later, Harris discovered a half-written song that he thought Lipa would sound perfect on. Shortly afterwards, he contacted Lipa through Twitter DMs while she was in Jamaica and asked if she would like to work on a track, which she agreed to. Lipa met Harris at his house in Los Angeles while she was on the Self-Titled Tour, where he played her his previous song and video to get a feeling for where "One Kiss" was going. Harris desired to create dance music like his previous work, ultimately wanting to create a house-sounding song with Lipa. "One Kiss" was written by the two and Canadian singer Jessie Reyez, although Harris stated that he had little to do with the song's lyrical content. It was recorded by Harris in January 2018 at God's Eyes Studios in Los Angeles, with him handling mixing as well at the same studio, while the song was mastered by Mike Marsh at The Exchange Mike Marsh Mastering in Devon.

On 21 March 2018, Harris changed his Twitter header image to one featuring a QR code in the centre. When scanned, the code read: "Calvin Harris & Dua Lipa – One Kiss". The following month, both artists announced the song with identical social media posts, revealing the blue cover art and the release date. "One Kiss" was released for digital download and streaming on 6 April 2018 through Sony Music and Columbia Records. The same day, the song was sent for radio airplay in Italy, while it impacted contemporary hit radio in the United States on 17 April. In the US, it was serviced to dance and rhythmic contemporary radio on 10 and 17 April, respectively. The song was released as a twelve-inch single on 20 July 2018 with the song's extended mix as its b-side. The song was included as the fourth track on the second disc of the reissue of Lipa's eponymous debut studio album Dua Lipa: Complete Edition, released on 19 October 2018.

== Music and lyrics ==
"One Kiss"
Set to 1990s house instrumentals, "One Kiss" features a repeating synth-line that interplays between organs and the bassline. The lyrics see Lipa exploring the idea of falling in love instantly.

Musically, "One Kiss" is a dance-pop, diva house and tropical house song. The song sees Harris returning to the EDM sound of his earlier works, while incorporating 1990s, electro house, Eurodance, funky disco, funk house, psychedelic electropop and UK garage elements. It is composed in 4/4 time and the key of F major, with a dance tempo of 124 beats per minute, and a chord progression of Am–B♭maj7–Fmaj7–Gm9.

Driven by bassy house beats, "One Kiss" makes use of 1990s house instrumentals, including horns and pianos that were also categorized as such, a repeating synth-line, and interplays between organs and the bassline. The song opens with a lengthy instrumental intro, containing tropical beats, before Lipa begins to sing over mellow synthesizers. The chorus features a deep-bass alongside tropical house horns. The brass instruments used in the track, which are initially heard in the first post-chorus, were described as sounding as though they have been pitch-modulated. For the final chorus, the middle section has a slow textural build‑up, before solely Lipa's vocals are heard on the first part of the chorus.

Lipa's vocals were categorized as clear and smooth with raspy splashes, and they range one octave from G_{3} to G_{4}. Lyrically, the song sees Lipa exploring the idea of falling in love with a romantical interest straight away, and vice versa, mentioning a kiss being used to trigger immense lust. The chorus has a total of four lines: "One kiss is all it takes / Falling in love with me / Possibilities / I look like all you need."

== Critical reception ==
Mike Wass of Idolator regarded "One Kiss" as "[Harris'] most accessible and instantly catchy track since 'This Is What You Came For' in 2016," labelling its chorus "club-conquering," and writing that the song is "guaranteed to be massive." For MTV, Ross McNeilage stated the song is "undoubtedly going to become the soundtrack to our summer" and labelled it "the year's first bona fide sunshine banger." He concluded by stating the song is "a lot more uplifting" than Lipa's previous dance collaboration "Scared to Be Lonely" (2017) with Martin Garrix. The Guardian's Graeme Virtue noted the song's "lacquer of late-night sophistication" that makes it "surprisingly moreish." Grace Fleisher of Dancing Astronaut regarded the song as a "bubbling crossover" and stated that Harris "plunges deep into the depths of danceability."

In Billboard, Kat Bein stated that "One Kiss" "stings with humidity and sweat like a foggy warehouse rave in the '90s underground but lingers sweet like a cocktail that sips dangerously easy." For the same magazine, Katie Atkinson praised Lipa's "syrupy" vocals and complimented the song's 1990s elements, while also writing it "never goes too deep or overstays its welcome." She concluded by admitting that "one listen is all it takes to fall in love" with the song. Tom Breihan of Stereogum complimented Lipa's "house-diva duties" and her ability to "breathe on a monstrous beat," while labelling the beat "swooshing" and "mechanized." Writing for Uproxx, Katrina Nattress viewed the song as a "club-ready tropical house banger" that "screams sunshine and making out on the dance floor." Complex's Julia Pimentel stated it is "breezy, radio-ready certified" and "tailor-made for summertime pool parties." Vice's Lauren O'Neill opined that the song "[conjures] up its summery vibe" despite an inability to "reach the quietly euphoric heights of a number of the moments from Funk Wav Bounces Vol. 1."

== Accolades ==
"One Kiss" was placed on several year-end lists of 2018. The song was placed as the Best Dance/Electronic Song of 2018 by Billboard, with Kat Bein stating the song "reigned supreme" in the 1990s house comeback year, while also praising Lipa's voice for "[melting] into each pulsing beat." For the same magazine's Best Songs of 2018, the song was ranked at number 12, while on The Guardian's, it placed at number 70. Of Popjustice's Top Singles of 2018 list, the song was given the 14th position, and was placed Time Out's unsorted Songs that Made 2018 list. In April 2020, Christopher Rosa of Glamour ranked "One Kiss" as Lipa's eighth best song, calling it a "perfect pool day in music form" and a "shimmery ode to '90s house" that is "why people install outdoor speakers in their homes."

"One Kiss" received multiple awards and nominations. Most notably, the song won the Brit Award for British Single of the Year at the 2019 Brit Awards. At the 2019 Billboard Music Awards, 2018 iHeartRadio Music Awards, and 2018 Teen Choice Awards, it received a nomination for best Dance/Electronic Song, but did not win both awards. The song was also nominated for Song of the Summer categories at the 2018 MTV Video Music Awards and the 2018 Teen Choice Awards. At 2018's BBC Radio 1's Teen Awards, the song was nominated for Best Single and International Song of the Year at the LOS40 Music Awards 2018. The song was nominated for the 2018 Popjustice £20 Music Prize.

== Commercial performance ==
"One Kiss" debuted at number three on the UK Singles Chart dated 19 April 2018. The following week, the song rose to the summit of the chart, replacing Drake's "Nice for What" (2018) while becoming Harris' ninth and Lipa's second number one single, following "New Rules" (2017) for the latter artist. It went on to spend eight consecutive weeks at the top spot, ultimately being succeeded by "I'll Be There" (2018) by Jess Glynne on the issue dated 21 June 2018. Due to the eight consecutive weeks, it became both artists' longest running number one single. The song spent a total of 53 weeks on the UK Singles Chart, eventually departing the chart in June 2019. It also topped the UK Dance Chart. In February 2025, the song was awarded a sextuple platinum certification by the British Phonographic Industry (BPI) for selling 3,600,000 track-equivalent units in the UK.

"One Kiss" topped the charts in Austria, Belgium, Croatia, the Czech Republic, Ecuador, Germany, Greece, Hungary, Ireland, Lebanon, the Netherlands, Poland, Portugal, Russia, Scotland, Slovakia, and Slovenia.In France, it debuted at number 95, before entrying in the top forty, at number 39, and later reaching the top five, at number 2, becoming Harris fourth top five and Lipa first ever in the country. The song stayed 61 weeks, becoming Harris third running longuest-running song in the country after "We Found Love" with Rihanna and "Feel So Close" (2011), respectively stayed 111 and 75 weeks, and Lipa's first ever, before being dethroned by "Levitating" (2020), who stayed 109 weeks. The song was certified diamond by the SNEP. In Australia, the song debuted at number 17 on the ARIA Singles Chart, going on to peak at number 3 in its eighth week, remaining at the position for a total of 2 weeks and departing the chart 12 weeks later. The song was certified quintuple platinum by the Australian Recording Industry Association (ARIA) for sales of 350,000 track-equivalent units in the country. The song also reached number six on the New Zealand Singles Chart and Canadian Hot 100.

In the US, "One Kiss" debuted at number 62 on the Billboard Hot 100 chart dated 21 April 2018. In its 15th week, the song rose to a peak of number 26, and spent a total of 21 weeks on the chart. On US radio charts, it reached number 29, 9, and 32 on the Adult Top 40, Mainstream Top 40, Rhythmic charts, which monitor adult contemporary, pop, and rhythmic radio formats, respectively. The song additionally topped the US Dance Club Songs chart and reached number two on the Hot Dance/Electronic Songs. In September 2022, the song received a quadruple platinum certification from the Recording Industry Association of America (RIAA) for sales of 4,000,000 certified units in the US.

== Music video ==
Upon its release, "One Kiss" was accompanied by a lyric video and a vertical video, the latter of which was released via Spotify. The lyric video features VHS-quality footage of a vintage television in an outdoor setting, which plays two couples kissing repeatedly. The song's official music video premiered exclusively through Apple Music on 1 May 2018, later being released to YouTube the following day. The video was directed by Emil Nava, who had previously worked with Harris on many visuals, including "Outside" (2014), "This Is What You Came For" (2016), and "Feels" (2017), as well as Lipa's "Hotter than Hell" (2016).

Harris appears as Lipa's waiter in the music video.

The video begins with Lipa standing in a blue robe against a green screen, before plastic palm trees are seen swaying in the background and her backup dancers soon join her while wearing teal sequin tops and pants. Lipa then dances on a pile of sand as the Sun rises behind her. In the following scenes, Lipa wears an oversized straw hat when lying on a fluffy white rug and also sits in the center of a flower while magenta petals bloom, which later turn yellow and blue. Harris is then seen at a pool, sitting on a lounge chair and wearing a suit. Lipa also sits on a lounge chair, wearing a purple suit and sunglasses as she watches a multi-coloured dragon puppet, which later has big eyes and dances by Harris. In the same scene, Lipa stands on a diving board while her backup dancers raise their legs, sitting on the patio. She later sits on the board, while Harris carries a martini tray behind her, which Lipa goes on to take an appetizer from. Lipa's backup dancers are then seen wearing the puppet head, with the puppet flying in the sky. In the final scene, Lipa lies on a bubbled window. The visual closes with the camera turning towards the director, who shuts it off.

Luke Morgan Britton of NME viewed the visual as "exotic" and "tropical," while summarizing by writing that it "depicts a poolside Lipa and Harris dressed as a waiter." In the same magazine, Hannah Mylrea named the video one of the best music videos of 2018, labelling it "trippy" and "vibrant," as well as calling the backdrops "flamboyant" and "tropical," and the wardrobe "retro." She concluded by writing that the music video is "basically what would happen if your trendy pals Instagram aesthetic came to life, in the best possible way." Bein praised the puppets in the video, writing that they "really steal the show," while stating Harris looks "stoic and cool," and Lipa looks "ravishing in vibrant vintage wear." O'Neill regarded the video as a "Missguided.co.uk mood board," and thought that one is "likely to catch" Lipa's outfits on their Instagram Explore page. The visual was a Winning Video at the 2018 MTV Video Play Awards. It was also nominated for British Video of the Year at the 2019 Brit Awards, Best Dance at the 2018 MTV Video Music Awards, and Best Dance Video – UK at the 2018 UK Music Video Awards.

== Live performances ==
Harris and Lipa performed "One Kiss" for the first time during an episode of The Graham Norton Show on 20 April 2018. For the performance, she wore an orange single-breasted blazer with matching-coloured tights from Versace's Spring 2018 runway show. Lipa gave a solo performance of the song at the opening ceremony that preceded the 2018 UEFA Champions League Final on 26 May of that year in Kyiv. Following its release, the song was added to the setlist of the Self-Titled Tour (2017–2018) by Lipa. On 10 February 2019, Lipa performed the song as a mash-up with St. Vincent at the 61st Annual Grammy Awards, who performed her single "Masseduction" (2018). Harris and Lipa performed the song as part of a medley that saw Sam Smith perform "Promises" (2018), and Rag'n'Bone Man performing "Giant" (2019) at the 2019 Brit Awards on 20 February, as well as a special appearance from Canadian model Winnie Harlow. The song was later included on the setlist of Lipa's 2022 Future Nostalgia Tour.

== Remixes ==
"One Kiss" has been accompanied by several remixes. The first remix was one by Jauz, which was released on 18 May 2018. He first performed the song a month earlier at the 2018 Coachella Valley Music and Arts Festival, which was described as reminiscent of his sound from 2015 and dubstep. The remix is a house and club track marked with Jauz's signature dark bass, while it also features bass house synthesizers and has an underground basement groove appeal. On 25 May 2018, a remix by Zhu was released. A dark tech house track, the remix includes ominous house stylings, house percussion with brooding kick drums, a future house melody and arpeggiated techno synths. Zhu also changed Lipa's vocal pitch and added his own falsetto.

Oliver Heldens remixed the song, with his remix being released on 1 June 2018. The remix reimagines "One Kiss" as a deep house and future bass track with organic elements and Heldens' signature bass sound. It also features ghostly horns, hypnotic and dreamy club beats, murky melodies, a distorted bass that contrasts Lipa's voice on the chorus, and organ synths alongside her voice. Remixes by R3hab and Valentino Khan were released on 8 and 15 June 2018, respectively. The R3hab remix features synth horn hits and shimmering atmospheres. On 13 July 2018, a remix EP, including previously released remixes as well as remixes by Patrick Topping and King Britt, was released. Topping's stripped down remix was categorized as a tech house track and makes use of bubbling horns, rolling basslines, jumpity hi-hats, and lashings of strings.

== Legacy ==
At the 2018 UEFA Champions League final, the song became associated with the runner-up of the match (and subsequently, of the tournament), Liverpool F.C., with fans singing it during the following year's tournament when they lifted the trophy in Madrid, and also being sung during the 2019–20 Premier League season, where Liverpool won their first top flight title in 30 years. Lipa said she was "honoured" and "lucky" that the song had been adopted by fans of the club. The song was used in 2022 when Liverpool won the Carabao Cup at Wembley, with Lipa retweeting videos of the club's fans also singing it at the 2022 FA Cup final, where Liverpool also won. The association of the song with the club led to Harris, himself a fan of the club and close friend of player Andrew Robertson, being invited to DJ on Liverpool's open top trophy parade, which almost 750,000 people attended. The song was once again played at Anfield, after Liverpool had successfully secured enough points to be crowned champions in the 2024-2025 Premier league season.

== Track listings ==
- Digital download and streaming
1. "One Kiss" – 3:34
- Digital download and streaming – Jauz remix
1. "One Kiss" (Jauz remix) – 4:12
- Digital download and streaming – Jauz Extended remix
1. "One Kiss" (Jauz Extended remix) – 5:00
- Digital download and streaming – Zhu remix
1. "One Kiss" (Zhu remix) – 4:00
- Digital download and streaming – Oliver Heldens remix
1. "One Kiss" (Oliver Heldens remix) – 4:41
- Digital download and streaming – Oliver Heldens extended remix
1. "One Kiss" (Oliver Heldens extended remix) – 5:27
- Digital download and streaming – R3hab remix
1. "One Kiss" (R3hab remix) – 3:10
- Digital download and streaming – R3hab extended remix
1. "One Kiss" (R3hab extended remix) – 4:20
- Digital download and streaming – Valentino Khan remix
1. "One Kiss" (Valentino Khan remix) – 4:11
- Digital download and streaming – Valentino Khan extended remix
1. "One Kiss" (Valentino Khan extended remix) – 4:55
- Digital EP – remixes
1. "One Kiss" (R3hab remix) – 3:10
2. "One Kiss" (Jauz remix) – 4:12
3. "One Kiss" (Oliver Heldens remix) – 4:41
4. "One Kiss" (Valentino Khan remix) – 4:11
5. "One Kiss" (Patrick Topping remix) – 3:53
6. "One Kiss" (Zhu remix) – 4:00
7. "One Kiss" (King Britt remix) – 6:04
- Digital EP – remixes – Beatport version
1. "One Kiss" (R3hab extended remix) – 4:20
2. "One Kiss" (Jauz extended remix) – 4:59
3. "One Kiss" (Oliver Heldens extended remix) – 5:27
4. "One Kiss" (Valentino Khan extended remix) – 4:55
5. "One Kiss" (Patrick Topping extended remix) – 6:12
6. "One Kiss" (Zhu remix) – 4:00
7. "One Kiss" (King Britt remix) – 6:04
8. "One Kiss" (extended mix) – 4:42
- 12-inch vinyl
1. "One Kiss" – 3:34
2. "One Kiss" (extended mix) – 4:42

== Personnel ==
- Calvin Harris – production, recording, mixing
- Dua Lipa – vocals
- Mike Marsh – mastering, lacquer cut

== Charts ==
=== Weekly charts ===
Weekly chart positions for "One Kiss"
| Chart (2018) | Peak position |
|---|---|
| Argentina Hot 100 (Billboard) | 54 |
| Australia (ARIA) | 3 |
| Australia Dance (ARIA) | 1 |
| Austria (Ö3 Austria Top 40) | 1 |
| Belarus Airplay (Eurofest) | 4 |
| Belgium (Ultratop 50 Flanders) | 1 |
| Belgium Dance (Ultratop Flanders) | 1 |
| Belgium (Ultratop 50 Wallonia) | 1 |
| Bolivia Airplay (Monitor Latino) | 2 |
| Brazil Airplay (Top 100 Brasil) | 80 |
| Canada Hot 100 (Billboard) | 6 |
| Canada AC (Billboard) | 34 |
| Canada Hot AC (Billboard) | 12 |
| Canada CHR/Top 40 (Billboard) | 4 |
| CIS Airplay (TopHit) | 1 |
| Colombia Airplay (National-Report) | 18 |
| Costa Rica Airplay (Monitor Latino) | 13 |
| Croatia International Airplay (Top lista) | 1 |
| Czech Republic Airplay (ČNS IFPI) | 6 |
| Czech Republic Singles Digital (ČNS IFPI) | 1 |
| Denmark (Tracklisten) | 2 |
| Dominican Republic Airplay (SodinPro) | 20 |
| Ecuador Airplay (National-Report) | 1 |
| El Salvador Airplay (Monitor Latino) | 3 |
| Euro Digital Song Sales (Billboard) | 1 |
| Finland (Suomen virallinen lista) | 3 |
| France (SNEP) | 2 |
| Germany (GfK) | 1 |
| Global 200 (Billboard) | 43 |
| Greece International (IFPI) | 1 |
| Hungary (Dance Top 40) | 1 |
| Hungary (Rádiós Top 40) | 1 |
| Hungary (Single Top 40) | 1 |
| Hungary (Stream Top 40) | 1 |
| Iceland (Tónlistinn) | 1 |
| Ireland (IRMA) | 1 |
| Israel International Airplay (Media Forest) | 1 |
| Italy (FIMI) | 8 |
| Japan Hot 100 (Billboard) | 44 |
| Lebanon (Lebanese Top 20) | 1 |
| Luxembourg Digital Song Sales (Billboard) | 1 |
| Malaysia (RIM) | 5 |
| Mexico Airplay (Billboard) | 1 |
| Netherlands (Dutch Top 40) | 1 |
| Netherlands (Single Top 100) | 1 |
| New Zealand (Recorded Music NZ) | 6 |
| Norway (VG-lista) | 5 |
| Poland Airplay (ZPAV) | 1 |
| Poland Dance (ZPAV) | 1 |
| Portugal (AFP) | 1 |
| Puerto Rico Airplay (Monitor Latino) | 13 |
| Romania (Airplay 100) | 3 |
| Russia Airplay (TopHit) | 1 |
| Scottish Singles Sales (Official Charts) | 1 |
| Singapore (RIAS) | 5 |
| Slovakia Airplay (ČNS IFPI) | 6 |
| Slovakia Singles Digital (ČNS IFPI) | 1 |
| Slovenia Airplay (SloTop50) | 1 |
| South Korea International (Gaon) | 56 |
| Spain (Promusicae) | 13 |
| Sweden (Sverigetopplistan) | 4 |
| Switzerland (Schweizer Hitparade) | 2 |
| UK Singles (Official Charts) | 1 |
| UK Dance (Official Charts) | 1 |
| Ukraine Airplay (TopHit) | 40 |
| US Billboard Hot 100 | 26 |
| US Adult Pop Airplay (Billboard) | 29 |
| US Dance Club Songs (Billboard) | 1 |
| US Hot Dance/Electronic Songs (Billboard) | 2 |
| US Pop Airplay (Billboard) | 9 |
| US Rhythmic Airplay (Billboard) | 32 |
| Venezuela Airplay (National-Report) | 22 |

2022 weekly chart positions for "One Kiss"
| Chart (2022) | Peak position |
|---|---|
| Vietnam (Vietnam Hot 100) | 57 |

2026 weekly chart positions for "One Kiss"
| Chart (2026) | Peak position |
|---|---|
| Lithuania Airplay (TopHit) | 92 |

=== Year-end charts ===
2018 year-end chart positions for "One Kiss"
| Chart (2018) | Position |
|---|---|
| Argentina (Monitor Latino) | 34 |
| Australia (ARIA) | 20 |
| Austria (Ö3 Austria Top 40) | 8 |
| Belgium (Ultratop Flanders) | 1 |
| Belgium (Ultratop Wallonia) | 2 |
| Bulgaria (PROPHON) | 8 |
| Canada (Canadian Hot 100) | 19 |
| CIS (Tophit) | 5 |
| Denmark (Tracklisten) | 9 |
| El Salvador (Monitor Latino) | 12 |
| France (SNEP) | 8 |
| Germany (Official German Charts) | 4 |
| Hungary (Dance Top 40) | 10 |
| Hungary (Rádiós Top 40) | 6 |
| Hungary (Single Top 40) | 12 |
| Hungary (Stream Top 40) | 6 |
| Iceland (Tónlistinn) | 2 |
| Ireland (IRMA) | 2 |
| Italy (FIMI) | 19 |
| Netherlands (Dutch Top 40) | 1 |
| Netherlands (Single Top 100) | 1 |
| New Zealand (Recorded Music NZ) | 39 |
| Poland (Polish Airplay Top 100) | 10 |
| Portugal (AFP) | 7 |
| Romania (Airplay 100) | 16 |
| Russia Airplay (Tophit) | 5 |
| Slovenia (SloTop50) | 10 |
| Spain (PROMUSICAE) | 23 |
| Sweden (Sverigetopplistan) | 16 |
| Switzerland (Schweizer Hitparade) | 9 |
| Ukraine Airplay (Tophit) | 200 |
| UK Singles (OCC) | 1 |
| US Billboard Hot 100 | 68 |
| US Dance Club Songs (Billboard) | 1 |
| US Hot Dance/Electronic Songs (Billboard) | 4 |
| US Mainstream Top 40 (Billboard) | 33 |

2019 year-end chart positions for "One Kiss"
| Chart (2019) | Position |
|---|---|
| France (SNEP) | 141 |
| Hungary (Dance Top 40) | 18 |
| Portugal (AFP) | 139 |
| UK Singles (OCC) | 70 |
| US Hot Dance/Electronic Songs (Billboard) | 26 |

2022 year-end chart positions for "One Kiss"
| Chart (2022) | Position |
|---|---|
| Global 200 (Billboard) | 152 |

2023 year-end chart positions for "One Kiss"
| Chart (2023) | Position |
|---|---|
| Global Excl. US (Billboard) | 191 |

=== Decade-end charts ===
2010–2019 decade-end chart positions for "One Kiss"
| Chart (2010–2019) | Position |
|---|---|
| Netherlands (Single Top 100) | 26 |
| UK Singles (OCC) | 38 |
| US Hot Dance/Electronic Songs (Billboard) | 29 |

== Certifications ==
Certifications and sales
| Region | Certification | Certified units/sales |
|---|---|---|
| Australia (ARIA) | 9× Platinum | 630,000^{‡} |
| Austria (IFPI Austria) | 2× Platinum | 60,000^{‡} |
| Belgium (BRMA) | 2× Platinum | 80,000^{‡} |
| Brazil (Pro-Música Brasil) | 3× Diamond | 480,000^{‡} |
| Canada (Music Canada) | 3× Platinum | 240,000^{‡} |
| Denmark (IFPI Danmark) | 4× Platinum | 360,000^{‡} |
| France (SNEP) | Diamond | 333,333^{‡} |
| Germany (BVMI) | 2× Platinum | 800,000^{‡} |
| Italy (FIMI) | 3× Platinum | 150,000^{‡} |
| Mexico (AMPROFON) | 3× Diamond+2× Platinum+Gold | 1,050,000^{‡} |
| New Zealand (RMNZ) | 6× Platinum | 180,000^{‡} |
| Norway (IFPI Norway) | 2× Platinum | 120,000^{‡} |
| Poland (ZPAV) | Diamond | 100,000^{‡} |
| Portugal (AFP) | 4× Platinum | 40,000^{‡} |
| Spain (Promusicae) | 4× Platinum | 240,000^{‡} |
| Switzerland (IFPI Switzerland) | 3× Platinum | 60,000^{‡} |
| United Kingdom (BPI) | 6× Platinum | 3,600,000^{‡} |
| United States (RIAA) | 4× Platinum | 4,000,000^{‡} |
Streaming
| Greece (IFPI Greece) | Platinum | 2,000,000^{†} |
^{‡} Sales+streaming figures based on certification alone.^{†} Streaming-only figures based on certification alone.

== Release history ==
Release dates and formats
| Region | Date | Format(s) | Version | Label(s) | Ref. |
|---|---|---|---|---|---|
| Various | 6 April 2018 | Digital download; streaming | Original | Columbia; Sony | |
| Italy | 6 April 2018 | Radio airplay | Original | Sony | |
| United States | 10 April 2018 | Dance radio | Original | Columbia | |
| United States | 17 April 2018 | Contemporary hit radio | Original | Columbia | |
| United States | 17 April 2018 | Rhythmic contemporary radio | Original | Columbia | |
| Various | 18 May 2018 | Digital download; streaming | Jauz remixes | Columbia; Sony | |
| Various | 25 May 2018 | Digital download; streaming | Zhu remix | Columbia; Sony | |
| Various | 1 June 2018 | Digital download; streaming | Oliver Heldens remixes | Columbia; Sony | |
| Various | 8 June 2018 | Digital download; streaming | R3hab remixes | Columbia; Sony | |
| Various | 15 June 2018 | Digital download; streaming | Valentino Khan remixes | Columbia; Sony | |
| Various | 13 July 2018 | Digital download; streaming | Remix EPs | Columbia; Sony | |
| Various | 20 July 2018 | 12-inch single | Original | Columbia; Sony | |

== See also ==
- List of most-streamed songs on Spotify
- List of Dutch Top 40 number-one singles of 2018
- List of number-one hits of 2018 (Germany)
- List of number-one singles of 2018 (Ireland)
- List of number-one singles of 2018 (Poland)
- List of number-one singles of 2018 (Portugal)
- List of Scottish number-one singles of 2018
- List of number-one singles of 2018 (Slovenia)
- List of UK Singles Chart number ones of the 2010s
- List of Ultratop 50 number-one singles of 2018
- List of number-one singles of the 2010s (Hungary)
- List of Billboard Dance Club Songs number ones of 2018
- List of top 10 singles in 2018 (Australia)
- List of top 10 singles in 2018 (France)
- List of UK top-ten singles in 2018
- Billboard Year-End Hot 100 singles of 2018
- List of Mexico Ingles Airplay singles of the 2010s
- List of UK Singles Chart number ones of the 2010s
