= IDGAF (Dua Lipa song) =

2018 single by Dua Lipa

Single by Dua Lipa

from the album Dua Lipa
- Written: February 2017
- Released: 12 January 2018
- Recorded: 2017
- Studio: Paramount, Los Angeles; Sarm Music Village, London
- Genre: Pop
- Length: 3:36
- Label: Warner Bros.
- Songwriters: Dua Lipa; MNEK; Larzz Principato; Skyler Stonestreet; Whiskey Water
- Producer: Koz

Dua Lipa singles chronology
"New Rules" (2017)	"IDGAF" (2018)	"One Kiss" (2018)

Music video
- "IDGAF" on YouTube

"IDGAF" (an initialism for "I don't give a fuck") is a song by English singer Dua Lipa from her eponymous debut studio album (2017). The song was written by Lipa, MNEK, Larzz Principato, Skyler Stonestreet, and Whiskey Water, with Koz handling the production. It was released for digital download and streaming on 12 January 2018 as the eighth and final single from the album. A pop song, Lipa uses a deadpan vocal delivery, backed by an electro palm-muted electric guitar riff and a militaristic drum line. Lyrically, the song is about an ex-boyfriend who intends to get back with the singer, who is uninterested.

Several music critics complimented the strong production and post-breakup lyrics of "IDGAF". The song was viewed as a sequel to "New Rules", Lipa's previous single. It was nominated for British Single of the Year at the 2019 Brit Awards. Commercially, the song reached the top 10 of charts in 20 territories worldwide, including Croatia and Ireland where it reached the summit. On the UK Singles Chart the song peaked at number 3. It is certified multi-platinum in six countries. This includes a triple platinum award in the United Kingdom, double platinum awards in Italy, Norway, and the United States, a quadruple platinum award in Australia, and a six-times platinum certification in Canada.

The music video for "IDGAF" accompanied its single release and was directed by Henry Scholfield. It features two versions of Lipa, a vulnerable romantic and an empowered spirit, who perform a dance battle against one another with their respective girl groups. One group wears purple and the other wears orange. Several critics praised its self-love message and the choreography. The video was nominated for Best Choreography at the 2018 MTV Video Music Awards and British Video of the Year at the 2019 Brit Awards. Lipa promoted the song with numerous live performances, including ones on The Ellen DeGeneres Show, Jimmy Kimmel Live!, and The Late Show with Stephen Colbert. Remixes by Anna of the North, Young Franco, and featuring Saweetie were released for further promotion.

== Background and composition ==
"IDGAF" was written by Dua Lipa alongside MNEK, Larzz Principato, Skyler Stonestreet and Whiskey Water, with production from Koz. The song was originally written by MNEK and was later picked up by Lipa who made adjustments with him in the studio; she did this to make the lyrics more relevant to her. The rewrites took place in Los Angeles in February 2017. The song was one of the last songs recorded for Lipa's eponymous debut studio album (2017). Lipa was inspired after an ex-boyfriend who was really mean to her, messaged her saying "Hi" and expressing his enjoyment of her music, which made her think, "What gives him the right to call me now and see how I'm doing? Does he not realize the damage he's done?" Lipa stated that parts of the song are true and parts are false. The song was recorded at Paramount Studios in Los Angeles and the vocal recording and engineering took place at Sarm Music Village in London. Mixing was done by Josh Gudwin and mastering was handled by John Davis at Metropolis Studios in London.

Musically, "IDGAF" is a pop song, running for 3 minutes and 36 seconds.The song is composed 4/4 time and the key of E minor, with a tempo of 100 beats per minute and a chord progression of Em–D–G/Bm–C. The track is backed by an electro palm-muted electric guitar riff, a militaristic drum line, a piano and a multi-tracked chorus. Lipa uses a deadpan vocal delivery, ranging two octaves from D_{3} to D_{5}. Lyrically in "IDGAF", the female protagonist's former lover comes back and attempts to rekindle things with her, but she sends him on his way and makes sure he knows that she is not thinking about him. The song was viewed as a sequel to "New Rules", another song by Lipa.

== Release and promotion ==
"IDGAF" was released through Warner Bros. Records on 2 June 2017 as the fifth track on Lipa's eponymous debut studio album. In November of that year, Lipa confirmed that it would serve as a single, to be released in 2018 due to the rising success of "New Rules". On 8 January 2018, she announced its official single release and revealed the cover art. The song was released for digital download and streaming on 12 January 2018 as the eighth and final single from Dua Lipa. The same day, a radio edit was digitally released. It was sent for radio airplay in Italy a week later. On 27 February 2018, the song impacted contemporary hit radio formats in the United States as the album's fourth single in the country.

On 23 February 2018, a remix extended play (EP) was released which includes remixes by Hazers, Anna of the North, Darius, and Young Franco. The Austrian, German and Swiss version of the EP added an additional remix by B-Case. A second remix EP was released on 4 May 2018. It features the B-Case remix alongside remixes by Diablo and Rich Brian as well as Initial Talk. It also included a remix featuring Saweetie and an acoustic version. The Hazers and Initial Talk remixes appear on the Japanese special edition of Dua Lipa and the Japanese edition of the album's 2018 reissue, Dua Lipa: Complete Edition. On 17 July 2018, Lipa released a demo to YouTube of the song where she sings in French in the pre-chorus. The track was intended to be released to music platforms featuring Maître Gims, however, went unreleased. A live version of the song is included on Lipa's Deezer Sessions EP as the third track, released on 11 April 2019.

== Critical reception ==
Jamie Milton of NME labelled the song a "post-breakup punch," while Dork's Jamie Muir stated that it "[drops] the bubblegum sharpness." For Clash, Alex Green categorized the drums as "crisp" and the lyrics "cutting," while calling it "likely the best track off the album." In AllMusic, Neil Z. Yeung called the song "cheeky" and compared it to the works of Ed Sheeran. He concluded by stating it is a "perfect anthem for anyone who has ever been burned by love." Sean Ward from The 405, praised the song for being a "stadium stomper" and predicted it to be a "dormant hit," while also viewing it as "a bright indicator to the longevity of [Lipa's] chart domination." He concluded by labelling the chorus "gigantic," the hook "memorable," and praising those aspects for being "radio A-list whilst retaining a subtle cool."

Ben Hogwood of musicOMH praised "IDGAF" for being "decisive" and Lipa's "don't mess" attitude, while commenting that it "[cuts] through the texture." For the Evening Standard, Rick Pearson stated the song shows Lipa's "edgier side." Max Mazonowicz of The Digital Fix called melody "terrific" and the chorus "punchy" and "not safe for work." Sebas E. Alonso from Jenesaispop called the track a "hymn of self-sufficiency" and compared the guitar to "Shape of You" (2017) by Sheeran and TLC's "No Scrubs" (1999). In a negative review from The Line of Best Fit, Claire Biddles thought the song felt "forced," further elaborating writing "like she's convincing herself that she doesn't care." She went on to call it a "relatable charade" that "falls a little flat," while also criticizing her lack of "carefree persona," unlike other tracks on Dua Lipa. "IDGAF" was a winning song at the 2019 BMI Pop Awards (Note: Only for share holdings owned by Larzz Principato, Skyler Stonestreet and Whiskey Water; shares of Dua Lipa and MNEK are ASCAP-controlled.) and it was nominated for British Single of the Year at the 2019 Brit Awards.

== Commercial performance ==
"IDGAF" debuted at number 55 on the UK Singles Chart issue dated 5 January 2018. In its eighth week on the chart, the song peaked at number 3. It departed the chart 21 weeks later, lasting a total of 29 weeks on the chart. In February 2023, the song was awarded a triple platinum certification by the British Phonographic Industry (BPI) for track-equivalent sales of 1,800,000 units. On the Irish Singles Chart, the song debuted at number 92 on the issue dated 29 December 2017. It eventually reached the summit of the chart the following month and lasted a total of 24 weeks. Elsewhere in Europe, the song entered the top 10 in Austria, Belgium, Croatia, Greece, the Netherlands, Norway, Poland, Portugal, Scotland, and Slovenia.

In Australia, "IDGAF" entered the ARIA Singles Chart at number 23 on the chart issue dated 4 February 2018. It peaked at number 3 on the charted issue dated 8 April 2018. It spent 9 weeks in the chart's top 10 and a total of 21 weeks on the chart. The song performed similarly in New Zealand, debuting at number 38, and eventually lasting 2 weeks at its peak of 5. It received a four times multi-platinum certification from Recorded Music New Zealand (RMNZ) and Australian Recording Industry Association (ARIA) for selling 120,000 and 280,000 track-equivalent units, respectively. The song additionally entered the top 10 on official charts in Israel, Malaysia, and Singapore.

"IDGAF" debuted at number 92 on the Billboard Hot 100 issue dated 27 January 2018. It eventually reached a peak of 49 on the chart issue dated 9 June 2018. The song also reached the summit of the US Dance Club Songs chart, becoming her fourth number 1 on the chart. For adult contemporary and contemporary hit radio charts in the country, the song reached number 36 and 12 respectively on the Adult Top 40 and Mainstream Top 40 charts. It received a double platinum award from the Recording Industry Association of America (RIAA) for track-equivalent sales of 2,000,000 units. It also entered the Canadian Hot 100 at number 29 and received a seven times multi-platinum award from Music Canada (MC) for selling 560,000 track-equivalent units.

== Music video ==
=== Background and release ===
The music video for "IDGAF" premiered via YouTube on 12 January 2018. It was directed by Henry Scholfield and uses VFX. Lipa described filming it as her "toughest and most challenging video to film," taking 22 hours to do so, using a single continuous tracking shot. Creative direction was handled by Mosaert while Marion Motin choreographed it.

We wanted to embody the sense of empowerment in the track, whilst going beyond the literal breakup context. We had in mind a visual of the internal struggle, showing the two sides of Dua's emotive state, like an argument with someone you love. The strong Dua at first berating then eventually persuading her weaker alter ego that they both don't give a fuck.

— Scholfield on the video.

=== Synopsis ===
Lipa and her backup dancers battle their clones in the music video

The video opens by panning around a solid-coloured lapis blue room, underneath a white oval light. Two versions of Lipa are seen wearing pantsuits with button down crop-tops underneath, one in purple and one in orange, with the orange having slicked-back hairdo and the blue having a tidy bun. They represent the vulnerable romantic and the empowered spirit stages that follow a break-up. Viewers are the slowly shown Lipa's backup dancers, who, like Lipa, have alternate versions that wear orange and purple. The two groups (orange and purple) begin shuffling between one and the other, with the two versions of Lipa portraying an annoyed conversation. The two groups eventually take their respective colours side, with Lipa as the head. They begin to perform aggravated gestures and expressive choreography.

The blue team jumps up, while the red team put their hands under their chins, pointing them at the blues. The blues walk to the corner looking backwards while Lipa looks to the camera, with the group eventually walking towards the reds and leaning over them. They all roll their shoulders before putting their hands in front of each other. The backup dancers then leave and the two Lipas are seen staring at each other while laying on the floor. When they are seen standing up again, the groups run up to each other, before each dancer takes a turn, spinning around their alter ego and going the way their alter ego came. The room turns back to a lapis blue light before the reds fall to the floor, watching the blues dance. The blue Lipa then turns towards the camera as the red one looks backwards at a closing door. The blue Lipa then kisses the red Lipa on the forehead. The doors open again and each group goes in separate lines to perform a dance, before joining as a full group to continue their dance. The visual closes with the two Lipas nodding at one other before turning to face their group.

=== Reception ===
In V, Rayne H. Ellis summarized the video as "a clear tale of self-love and empowerment," while also praising its storyline. Billboard editor Nicholas Rice wrote that it sees Lipa "visualizing the internal struggle one faces through her hot and cold outfit color choices and interpretive dancing." Sara Cristiano of Much called the backup dancers "extremely talented" and compared their "realness" to Annie Lennox. Teen Vogue's Gabe Bergado labelled the dancers "stunning" and compared its ethos to that of "New Rules". Writing for Rolling Stone, Ryan Reed viewed the video as "kinetic" and "heavily choreographed."

Nora-Grayce Orosz from Complex stated that Lipa "bringing all the sass of her previous releases times two," and named the "[expert]" choreography "old-school." Reviewing for Spin, Tosten Burks called the video "bold-hued." Nylon's Hafeezah Nazim complimented the "intense interpretative" choreography and regarded the video as a whole "a visual representation of Lipa's internal struggle with herself." The Staff for Promotion Music News commended the video for "perfectly [encapsulating] those struggles that one faces during a breakup," and for ending on a positive note. In his review for Idolator, Mike Wass called the video "emo" and "striking," while Mar Maldonado of Soundigest viewed it as "unique" and "visually appealing."

On 28 November 2019, Lipa—who's ethnically Kosovo Albanian—used a still from the music video, depicting the blue Lipa kissing the red Lipa on the forehead, to mark that year's Albanian Flag Day. The still was edited to show the coat of arms of Kosovo on the blue Lipa, and the coat of arms of Albania on the red Lipa.

The "IDGAF" music video was nominated for British Video of the Year at the 2019 Brit Awards. At the 2018 MTV Video Music Awards, it received a nomination for Best Choreography. The video was longlisted for Music Video of 2018 at the 44th People's Choice Awards in 2018, and won Best Pop Video – UK at the 2018 UK Music Video Awards. It was a winning video at the 2018 MTV Video Play Awards.

== Live performances ==
Lipa performed "IDGAF" for the first time on 23 June at the Glastonbury Festival 2017. The song was included on the setlist for Lipa's Self-Titled Tour (2017–18). Before performing it on the tour, a message that wrote "You are about to experience some explicit language and behaviour. This is a song for all the fuckboys that have done you wrong. If you would like to participate in the next activity please put your middle fingers up" appeared on the screen. Lipa performed it in a BBC Radio 1 Live Lounge performance in Los Angeles, released 21 February 2018, with Charli XCX, Zara Larsson, Alma, and MØ performing backing vocals.

Lipa performed "IDGAF" on The Ellen DeGeneres Show on 14 March 2018. She wore an oversized suit and created several formations with her backup dancers, maneuvering around the stage. Lipa performed the song for Jimmy Kimmel Live! on 20 March 2018. She was accompanied by two backup singers and a full band and the song's lyrics appeared on the screen behind her as she sang. On 26 July 2018, Lipa performed the song on The Late Show with Stephen Colbert. It began with Lipa singing to herself in a mirror before being joined by four background dancers and a full band that included an electric guitarist.

== Track listings ==
- Digital download and streaming
1. "IDGAF" – 3:36
- Digital download and streaming – radio edit
1. "IDGAF" (radio edit) – 3:36
- Digital EP – remixes
1. "IDGAF" (Hazers remix) – 4:00
2. "IDGAF" (Anna of the North remix) – 3:40
3. "IDGAF" (Darius remix) – 6:46
4. "IDGAF" (Young Franco remix) – 3:14
- Digital EP – remixes – Austrian, German and Swiss version
1. "IDGAF" (B-Case remix) – 3:14
2. "IDGAF" (Hazers remix) – 4:00
3. "IDGAF" (Anna of the North remix) – 3:40
4. "IDGAF" (Darius remix) – 6:46
5. "IDGAF" (Young Franco remix) – 3:14
- Digital EP – remixes II
1. "IDGAF" (Initial Talk remix) – 3:27
2. "IDGAF" (Diablo and Rich Brian remix) – 3:12
3. "IDGAF" (B-Case remix) – 3:15
4. "IDGAF" (featuring Saweetie) – 3:58
5. "IDGAF" (acoustic) – 3:37

== Personnel ==
- Dua Lipa – vocals
- Stephen "Koz" Kozmeniuk – production, bass, drums, piano, synth
- Larzz Principato – co-production, guitar
- Todd Clark – additional backing vocals
- MNEK – additional backing vocals
- Lorna Blackwood – vocal production
- Kim Katz – record engineering
- Joel Peters – engineering
- Jeff Gunnell – assistant engineering
- Josh Gudwin – mixing
- John Davis – mastering

== Charts ==
=== Weekly charts ===
Weekly chart performance
Chart (2018)	Peak position
Argentina Anglo (Monitor Latino)	8
Australia (ARIA)	3
Austria (Ö3 Austria Top 40)	6
Belgium (Ultratop 50 Flanders)	4
Belgium (Ultratop 50 Wallonia)	3
Bolivia (Monitor Latino)	10
Brazil International Pop (Crowley Charts)	7
Canada Hot 100 (Billboard)	29
Canada CHR/Top 40 (Billboard)	26
CIS Airplay (TopHit)	96
Croatia International Airplay (Top lista)	1
Colombia (National-Report)	46
Czech Republic Airplay (ČNS IFPI)	11
Czech Republic Singles Digital (ČNS IFPI)	4
Denmark (Tracklisten)	17
Ecuador (National-Report)	54
Euro Digital Song Sales (Billboard)	7
Finland (Suomen virallinen lista)	17
France (SNEP)	71
Germany (GfK)	12
Greece International (IFPI)	6
Hungary (Editors' Choice Top 40)	13
Hungary (Single Top 40)	21
Hungary (Stream Top 40)	3
Ireland (IRMA)	1
Israel International Airplay (Media Forest)	2
Italy (FIMI)	12
Latvia (DigiTop100)	78
Luxembourg Digital (Billboard)	9
Malaysia (RIM)	4
Mexico (Billboard Mexican Airplay)	26
Netherlands (Dutch Top 40)	4
Netherlands (Single Top 100)	8
New Zealand (Recorded Music NZ)	5
Norway (VG-lista)	5
Poland Airplay (ZPAV)	3
Poland Dance (ZPAV)	38
Portugal (AFP)	7
Romania (Airplay 100)	55
Scottish Singles Sales (Official Charts)	5
Singapore (RIAS)	7
Slovakia Airplay (ČNS IFPI)	12
Slovakia Singles Digital (ČNS IFPI)	3
Slovenia (SloTop50)	9
South Korea International (Gaon)	26
Spain (Promusicae)	12
Sweden (Sverigetopplistan)	15
Switzerland (Schweizer Hitparade)	19
UK Singles (Official Charts)	3
US Billboard Hot 100	49
US Adult Pop Airplay (Billboard)	36
US Dance Club Songs (Billboard)	1
US Dance Airplay (Billboard)	30
US Pop Airplay (Billboard)	12
Venezuela (National-Report)	57

=== Monthly charts ===
Monthly chart performance
Chart (2018)	Peak position
Brazil Streaming (Pro-Música Brasil)	45

=== Year-end charts ===
2018 Year-end chart performance for "IDGAF"
Chart (2018)	Position
Australia (ARIA)	18
Argentina (Monitor Latino)	83
Austria (Ö3 Austria Top 40)	41
Belgium (Ultratop Flanders)	10
Belgium (Ultratop Wallonia)	46
Canada (Canadian Hot 100)	64
Denmark (Tracklisten)	40
El Salvador (Monitor Latino)	78
France (SNEP)	123
Germany (Official German Charts)	48
Iceland (Tónlistinn)	20
Ireland (IRMA)	5
Israel (Galgalatz)	6
Italy (FIMI)	32
Netherlands (Dutch Top 40)	24
Netherlands (Single Top 100)	35
New Zealand (Recorded Music NZ)	14
Poland (ZPAV)	40
Portugal (AFP)	21
Slovenia (SloTop50)	27
Spain (PROMUSICAE)	71
Sweden (Sverigetopplistan)	43
Switzerland (Schweizer Hitparade)	66
UK Singles (OCC)	11
US Billboard Hot 100	98
US Dance Club Songs (Billboard)	7
US Mainstream Top 40 (Billboard)	43

2019 Year-end chart performance for "IDGAF"
Chart (2019)	Position
Portugal (AFP)	171

== Certifications ==
Certifications and sales
Region	Certification	Certified units/sales
Australia (ARIA)	4× Platinum	280,000^{‡}
Austria (IFPI Austria)	Platinum	30,000^{‡}
Belgium (BRMA)	Platinum	40,000^{‡}
Canada (Music Canada)	9× Platinum	720,000^{‡}
Denmark (IFPI Danmark)	Platinum	90,000^{‡}
France (SNEP)	Platinum	200,000^{‡}
Germany (BVMI)	Gold	200,000^{‡}
Ireland	—	84,500 (Note: Ireland sales figures for "IDGAF" as of November 2018)
Italy (FIMI)	2× Platinum	100,000^{‡}
New Zealand (RMNZ)	5× Platinum	150,000^{‡}
Norway (IFPI Norway)	2× Platinum	120,000^{‡}
Poland (ZPAV)	4× Platinum	200,000^{‡}
Portugal (AFP)	3× Platinum	30,000^{‡}
Spain (Promusicae)	3× Platinum	180,000^{‡}
United Kingdom (BPI)	3× Platinum	1,800,000^{‡}
United States (RIAA)	5× Platinum	5,000,000^{‡}
Streaming
Sweden (GLF)	Platinum	8,000,000^{†}
^{‡} Sales+streaming figures based on certification alone.^{†} Streaming-only figures based on certification alone.

== Release history ==
Release dates and formats
Region	Date	Format(s)	Version	Label	Ref.
Various	12 January 2018	Digital download; streaming	Original	Warner Bros.	
Various	12 January 2018	Digital download; streaming	Radio edit	Warner Bros.	
Italy	19 January 2018	Radio airplay	Radio edit	Warner Bros.	
Various	23 February 2018	Digital download; streaming	Remixes EP	Warner Bros.	
Austria	23 February 2018	Digital download; streaming	Remixes EP	Universal	
Germany	23 February 2018	Digital download; streaming	Remixes EP	Universal	
Switzerland	23 February 2018	Digital download; streaming	Remixes EP	Universal	
United States	27 February 2018	Contemporary hit radio	Radio edit	Warner Bros.	
Various	4 May 2018	Digital download; streaming	Remixes II EP	Warner Bros.	

== See also ==
- List of Live Lounge cover versions
- List of one-shot music videos
- List of million-selling singles in the United Kingdom
- List of Platinum singles in the United Kingdom awarded since 2000
- List of Billboard Dance Club Songs number ones of 2018
- List of UK top-ten singles in 2018
- List of number-one singles of 2018 (Ireland)
- List of top 10 singles in 2018 (Australia)
- List of top 25 singles for 2018 in Australia
- List of most-streamed songs on Spotify
