= Promises (Calvin Harris and Sam Smith song) =

2018 single by Calvin Harris and Sam Smith

Single by Calvin Harris and Sam Smith
- Released: 17 August 2018
- Genre: House; dance-pop
- Length: 3:33
- Label: Columbia; Sony
- Songwriters: Adam Wiles; Jessie Reyez; Sam Smith
- Producer: Calvin Harris

Calvin Harris singles chronology
"One Kiss" (2018)	"Promises" (2018)	"I Found You" (2018)

Sam Smith singles chronology
"Baby, You Make Me Crazy" (2018)	"Promises" (2018)	"Fire on Fire" (2018)

Music video
- "Promises" on YouTube

"Promises" is a song by the Scottish DJ and record producer Calvin Harris and the English singer and songwriter Sam Smith. It was released by Columbia Records and Sony Music on 17 August 2018, and included on Smith's third studio album Love Goes (2020), and Harris' first compilation album, 96 Months (2024). Both artists co-wrote the song with Canadian singer-songwriter Jessie Reyez, who also provided additional vocals to the song, while the song's production was handled solely by Harris. It reached number one on the UK Singles Chart on 7 September 2018, having debuted at number four two weeks earlier. It became Harris' tenth British chart-topper and Smith's seventh. In the United States, the single became Harris' twelfth and Smith's first number-one on Billboard's Dance/Mix Show Airplay Chart in its 6 October 2018 issue.

== Release ==
Both artists announced the song via Twitter on 13 August 2018. "Very excited about this one", Harris wrote. Smith added: "Surprise! I'm so excited for you all to hear this song." The announcement was accompanied by a Japanese-inspired retro single artwork, which depicts a lone tree rising up in front of the ocean against a faded pink backdrop. The song marks Smith's third foray into electronic dance music, after being featured on Disclosure's singles "Latch" and "Omen" in 2012 and 2015, respectively. On 15 August, Smith posted a promotional photo on Twitter ahead of the single's release, showing them and Harris relaxing on a rooftop while sharing a bottle of wine and a pizza. The single was released alongside a lyric video.

== Composition ==
"Promises" is a house and dance-pop song recorded in the key of D♯ minor with a tempo of 123 beats per minute in common time. It follows a chord progression of Bmaj7–D♯m7–C♯sus2, and Smith's vocals span from C♯_{3} to A♯_{4}.

== Critical reception ==
Brandy Robidoux of Hollywood Life called the song "a music match made in heaven", writing that Smith's "smooth vocals" provides a "soulful vibe", while retaining the "classic Calvin thumping beat". Tom Ewing of Freaky Trigger named it the second best UK number-one hit of 2018, writing: "People sometimes look back on a golden age when record labels let talent develop at its own pace and kept the faith. Those times are gone, but we have all collectively spent a decade watching Calvin Harris gradually evolve from a massive irritant to a reliable delivery mechanism for pleasant pop-garage."

== Music video ==
The music video for "Promises" was released on 4 September, directed by Emil Nava, and it honors the LGBT community with references to the ball scene and voguing.

== Track listing ==
- Digital download
1. "Promises" – 3:33
- 12-inch single

Side A: "Promises" – 3:33
Side B: "Promises" (extended mix) – 8:27

- Digital download – remixes
1. "Promises" (David Guetta remix) – 3:10
2. "Promises" (MK remix) – 4:19
3. "Promises" (Sonny Fodera remix) – 3:57
4. "Promises" (Illyus & Barrientos remix) – 4:42
5. "Promises" (Franky Rizardo remix) – 4:26
6. "Promises" (Mousse T.'s Disco Shizzle remix) – 3:30
7. "Promises" (Offaiah remix) – 3:09
8. "Promises" (Sonny Fodera Disco mix) – 3:57
- Digital download – extended remixes
1. "Promises" (David Guetta extended remix) – 7:53
2. "Promises" (MK extended remix) – 8:01
3. "Promises" (Sonny Fodera extended remix) – 6:19
4. "Promises" (Illyus & Barrientos extended remix) – 6:00
5. "Promises" (Franky Rizardo extended remix) – 7:13
6. "Promises" (Mousse T.'s extended Disco Shizzle remix) – 6:26
7. "Promises" (Offaiah extended remix) – 7:02
8. "Promises" (Sonny Fodera extended disco mix) – 7:05
9. "Promises" (extended mix) – 8:27

== Personnel ==
Credits adapted from Tidal.

- Calvin Harris – production, mix engineering, record engineering
- Sam Smith – vocals
- Jessie Reyez – vocals
- Mike Marsh – master engineering

== Charts ==
=== Weekly charts ===
Chart (2018–2019)	Peak position
Argentina (Argentina Hot 100)	34
Australia (ARIA)	4
Australia Dance (ARIA)	1
Austria (Ö3 Austria Top 40)	6
Belarus Airplay (Eurofest)	4
Belgium (Ultratop 50 Flanders)	1
Belgium Dance (Ultratop Flanders)	1
Belgium (Ultratop 50 Wallonia)	2
Belgium Dance (Ultratop Wallonia)	1
Bolivia Airplay (Monitor Latino)	11
Brazil Airplay (Top 100 Brasil)	88
Canada Hot 100 (Billboard)	15
Canada AC (Billboard)	12
Canada CHR/Top 40 (Billboard)	3
Canada Hot AC (Billboard)	23
CIS Airplay (TopHit)	1
Colombia Airplay (National-Report)	38
Croatia International Airplay (HRT)	1
Czech Republic Airplay (ČNS IFPI)	14
Czech Republic Singles Digital (ČNS IFPI)	6
Denmark (Tracklisten)	4
Euro Digital Song Sales (Billboard)	1
Finland (Suomen virallinen lista)	8
France (SNEP)	12
Germany (GfK)	2
Greece (IFPI)	3
Hungary (Dance Top 40)	7
Hungary (Rádiós Top 40)	1
Hungary (Single Top 40)	3
Hungary (Stream Top 40)	3
Iceland (Tónlistinn)	1
Ireland (IRMA)	1
Israel International Airplay (Media Forest)	1
Italy (FIMI)	6
Japan Hot 100 (Billboard)	71
Lebanon (OLT20)	1
Lithuania (AGATA)	1
Luxembourg Digital Song Sales (Billboard)	1
Mexico Airplay (Billboard)	1
Netherlands (Dutch Top 40)	2
Netherlands (Single Top 100)	4
Netherlands (Dance Top 30)	2
New Zealand (Recorded Music NZ)	7
Norway (VG-lista)	5
Poland Airplay (ZPAV)	1
Portugal (AFP)	9
Romania (Airplay 100)	4
Russia Airplay (TopHit)	1
Scottish Singles Sales (Official Charts)	1
Singapore (RIAS)	15
Slovakia Airplay (ČNS IFPI)	2
Slovakia Singles Digital (ČNS IFPI)	3
Slovenia Airplay (SloTop50)	1
Spain (Promusicae)	52
Sweden (Sverigetopplistan)	3
Switzerland (Schweizer Hitparade)	3
UK Singles (Official Charts)	1
UK Dance (Official Charts)	1
Ukraine Airplay (TopHit)	3
US Billboard Hot 100	65
US Dance Club Songs (Billboard)	1
US Hot Dance/Electronic Songs (Billboard)	4
US Pop Airplay (Billboard)	20

2024–2026 weekly chart performance
Chart (2024–2026)	Peak position
Estonia Airplay (TopHit)	120
Lithuania Airplay (TopHit)	93
Romania Airplay (TopHit)	131

=== Year-end charts ===
Chart (2018)	Position
Australia (ARIA)	51
Austria (Ö3 Austria Top 40)	43
Belgium (Ultratop Flanders)	23
Belgium (Ultratop Wallonia)	40
Denmark (Tracklisten)	49
El Salvador (Monitor Latino)	91
Germany (Official German Charts)	38
Hungary (Dance Top 40)	42
Hungary (Rádiós Top 40)	37
Hungary (Single Top 40)	19
Iceland (Plötutíóindi)	7
Ireland (IRMA)	20
Italy (FIMI)	92
Netherlands (Dutch Top 40)	10
Netherlands (Single Top 100)	29
Poland (Polish Airplay Top 100)	22
Portugal (AFP)	100
Romania (Airplay 100)	57
Slovenia (SloTop50)	37
Sweden (Sverigetopplistan)	76
Switzerland (Schweizer Hitparade)	32
UK Singles (OCC)	25
US Dance Club Songs (Billboard)	36
US Hot Dance/Electronic Songs (Billboard)	14
Chart (2019)	Position
Australia (ARIA)	87
Belgium (Ultratop Flanders)	59
Belgium (Ultratop Wallonia)	92
CIS (Tophit)	39
Hungary (Dance Top 40)	30
Hungary (Rádiós Top 40)	8
Hungary (Single Top 40)	44
Iceland (Tónlistinn)	29
Netherlands (Dutch Top 40)	91
Portugal (AFP)	122
Romania (Airplay 100)	64
Russia Airplay (Tophit)	53
Slovenia (SloTop50)	28
Switzerland (Schweizer Hitparade)	79
Ukraine Airplay (Tophit)	27
UK Singles (OCC)	47
US Hot Dance/Electronic Songs (Billboard)	27
Chart (2022)	Position
Hungary (Rádiós Top 40)	72
Chart (2025)	Position
Hungary (Rádiós Top 40)	89

== Certifications and sales ==
Region	Certification	Certified units/sales
Australia (ARIA)	6× Platinum	420,000^{‡}
Austria (IFPI Austria)	Platinum	30,000^{‡}
Belgium (BRMA)	Platinum	40,000^{‡}
Brazil (Pro-Música Brasil)	2× Diamond	320,000^{‡}
Canada (Music Canada)	Platinum	80,000^{‡}
Denmark (IFPI Danmark)	2× Platinum	180,000^{‡}
France (SNEP)	Diamond	333,333^{‡}
Germany (BVMI)	Platinum	400,000^{‡}
Italy (FIMI)	2× Platinum	100,000^{‡}
Mexico (AMPROFON)	Diamond+4× Platinum	540,000^{‡}
New Zealand (RMNZ)	4× Platinum	120,000^{‡}
Poland (ZPAV)	4× Platinum	80,000^{‡}
Portugal (AFP)	2× Platinum	20,000^{‡}
Spain (Promusicae)	2× Platinum	120,000^{‡}
United Kingdom (BPI)	3× Platinum	2,100,000
United States (RIAA)	Platinum	1,000,000^{‡}
^{‡} Sales+streaming figures based on certification alone.

== Release history ==
Region	Date	Format	Version	Label	Ref.
Various	17 August 2018	Digital download; streaming	Original	Columbia; Sony	
United Kingdom	17 August 2018	Contemporary hit radio	Original	Columbia	
United States	21 August 2018	Contemporary hit radio	Original	Columbia	
Italy	31 August 2018	Contemporary hit radio	Original	Sony	
Various	12 October 2018	12-inch single	Original	Columbia; Sony	
Various	19 October 2018	Digital download; streaming	Remixes	Columbia; Sony	
Various	19 October 2018	Digital download; streaming	Extended remixes	Columbia; Sony	
