= 2019 in British music =

This is a summary of the year 2019 in British music.

== Events ==
- 3 January – The Royal College of Organists announces Hans Fagius and Nicolas Kynaston as the recipients of the RCO Medal for 2019.
- 10 January – The Brodsky Quartet announces the appointment of Gina McCormack as its new violinist, to replace the departing Daniel Rowland.
- 17 January – The Ernst von Siemens Music Foundation announces Rebecca Saunders as the recipient of the Ernst von Siemens Musikpreis 2019, the second woman and the first female composer ever to be honoured with the award.
- 21 January – The Barbican Centre, London Symphony Orchestra, and Guildhall School of Music and Drama jointly unveil initial designs for the proposed privately-funded centre for music in the City of London.
- 24 January – Tasmin Little announces her intention to retire from classical music performance in the summer of 2020.
- 25 January
  - The BBC Symphony Orchestra announces the appointment of Dalia Stasevska as its next principal guest conductor, the first woman to be named to the post and the second female conductor ever to be given a titled post with a BBC orchestra.
  - The Ulster Orchestra announces the appointment of Daniele Rustioni as its next chief conductor, effective September 2019.
  - The city of Schwäbisch Gmünd announces John Rutter as the recipient of the Preis der Europäischen Kirchenmusik 2019.
- 20 February – Future Talent announces Sheku Kanneh-Mason as its newest Ambassador.
- 4 March – Scala Radio, a new classical radio station, begins transmission.
- 8 March
  - A British Phonographic Industry report indicates that with respect to music provision, state schools have seen a 21% decrease over the past 5 years, compared to a net increase of 7% in independent schools during the same period.
  - Birmingham Contemporary Music Group announces the appointment of Seb Huckle as its new executive director.
- 29–31 March – The BBC Radio 6 Music Festival takes place in Liverpool.
- 17 April
  - English National Opera announces the resignation of Daniel Kramer as its artistic director, effective at the end of July 2019.
  - The Court of Appeal unanimously upholds the earlier ruling by the High Court of Justice in the case of Christopher Goldscheider v. Royal Opera House Covent Garden Foundation, in favour of Goldscheider.
- 22 April – The Lark Ascending by Ralph Vaughan Williams regains its position at number 1 in the Classic FM Top 300, revealed over the Easter weekend.
- 25 April – The Development Management Sub-Committee of the City of Edinburgh Council approves plans for the construction of Dunard Centre, the first purpose-built music and performance venue in Edinburgh in over 100 years.
- 29 April – The PRS Foundation announces that Vanessa Reed is to stand down as its executive director, effective with the summer of 2019.
- 7 May – BBC Radio 3 announces the musicians for its New Generation Artists scheme from 2019-21:
  - Eric Lu, piano
  - Alexander Gadjiev, piano
  - Timothy Ridout, viola
  - Consone Quartet
  - Johan Dalene, violin
  - Rob Luft, jazz guitar
  - Ema Nikoslovska, mezzo-soprano
- 10 May – The Philharmonia Orchestra announces that Helen Sprott is to stand down as its managing director.
- 22 May
  - The Philharmonia Orchestra announces the appointment of Santtu-Matias Rouvali as its next principal conductor, effective with the 2021-2022 season, with an initial contract of 5 years.
  - The Benedetti Foundation announces the appointment of Michael Garvey as its first-ever executive director.
  - The BBC National Orchestra of Wales (BBC NOW) announces that Michael Garvey is to stand down as director of the BBC NOW and the BBC National Chorus of Wales.
- 7 June
  - Queen's Birthday Honours:
    - Stephen Cleobury, Ian Stoutzker, and David Pountney are each made a Knight Bachelor.
    - Jonathan Dove, Joanna MacGregor, Mitch Murray and Mark Padmore are each made a Commander of the Order of British Empire.
    - Elvis Costello, Kathryn Harries, Feargal Sharkey and Robin Ticciati are each made an Officer of the Order of the British Empire.
    - Mary Bevan, Sophie Bevan, Alfie Boe, Jacqui Dankworth, Andy Heath, Anna Meredith, and Timothy Reynish are each made a Member of the Order of the British Empire.
- 14–16 June – Download Festival 2019 takes place at Donington Park in Leicestershire. The main stage is headlined by Def Leppard, Slipknot and Tool, the Zippo encore stage by Rob Zombie, Halestorm and Slayer (in their final UK appearance), the Avalanche stage by Me First and the Gimme Gimmes, Simple Creatures and Enter Shikari, and the Dogtooth stage by At the Gates, Carcass and Municipal Waste.
- 17 June – The Royal Philharmonic Society (RPS) announces the appointments of Alexander Goehr and Sir David Pountney as honorary members of the RPS.
- 22 June – The BBC Cardiff Singer of the World 2019 competition results are announced:
  - Main Prize – Andrei Kymach
  - Song Prize – Mingjie Lei
  - Audience Prize – Katie Bray
- 24 June – Opera North announces the appointment of Garry Walker as its next music director, effective with the 2020-21 season.
- 26 June – Opera Rara announces the appointment of Carlo Rizzi as its next artistic director, effective June 2020.
- 19 July – Karina Canellakis conducts the First Night of the Proms at the Royal Albert Hall, the first female conductor ever to conduct the First Night.
- 25 July – The London Philharmonic Orchestra announces the appointment of Edward Gardner as its next principal conductor, effective with the 2021-22 season, with an initial contract of 5 years.
- 3 September – At the Proms, Bernard Haitink conducts his 90th and final Prom, with the Vienna Philharmonic Orchestra and pianist Emanuel Ax.
- 11 September – The BBC National Orchestra of Wales announces the appointment of Ryan Bancroft as its next principal conductor, effective with the 2020-21 season, with an initial contract of 3 years.
- 16 September
  - The BBC announces the appointment of Lisa Tregale as the new Director of the BBC National Orchestra of Wales and the BBC National Chorus of Wales, effective in 2020. Tregale is the first woman to be named to the post.
  - Wigmore Hall awards Iestyn Davies the Wigmore Medal, after a concert at Wigmore Hall on his 40th birthday.
- 5 October – Lucia Lucas becomes the first transgender singer to perform with the English National Opera in London.
- 8 October – English National Opera announces the appointment of Annilese Miskimmon as its next artistic director, effective September 2020.
- 8 November – The Royal Albert Hall announces a new 5-year partnership with the Royal Philharmonic Orchestra as its new associate orchestra for year-round orchestral programmes.
- 9 December – The Yehudi Menuhin School announces the appointment of Tasmin Little as its new co-president.
- 27 December – UK New Year's Honours 2020:
  - Sir Elton John is made a Member of the Order of the Companions of Honour.
  - Olivia Newton-John is made a Dame Commander of the Order of the British Empire.
  - Humphrey Burton is made a Knight Bachelor.
  - Timothy Walker and Errollyn Wallen are each made a Commander of the Order of British Empire.
  - Judith Bingham, Nicola Killean, Gary Lightbody and Roger Taylor are each made an Officer of the Order of the British Empire.
  - Helen Grime, Sheku Kanneh-Mason, and Charles Kennard are each made a Member of the Order of the British Empire.

== Television programmes ==
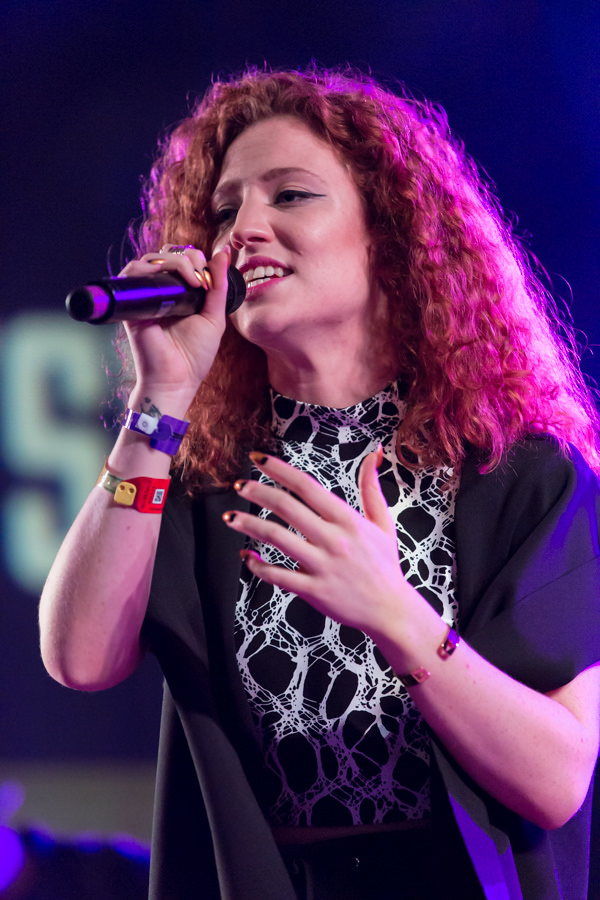
Jess Glynne

- 1 January – Jools' Annual Hootenanny features Marc Almond, George Ezra, Junior Giscombe, Jess Glynne and others.
- 24 February – Pappano's Greatest Arias, presented by Antonio Pappano
- 1 March – Say Hello, Wave Goodbye, documentary about Soft Cell
- 14 April – Janet Baker in her own words, documentary about Janet Baker
- 7 September – Strictly Come Dancing 2019 series, introducing new judge Motsi Mabuse.
- 12 October
  - The X Factor: Celebrity; competitors include Brendan Cole, Martin Bashir and Hayley Hasselhoff The series is won by Megan McKenna, with Max and Harvey second and Jenny Ryan third.
  - Mark Ronson: From the Heart (BBC4 documentary)
- 10 December – Lucy Worsley's Christmas Carol Odyssey (BBC4 documentary)

== Artists and groups ==
=== Formed ===
- Flo
- Sault
- Wet Leg

=== Reformed ===
- Doves
- The Futureheads
- Goodbye Mr Mackenzie
- JLS
- Lighthouse Family
- McFly
- Monaco
- Roxy Music
- Shakespears Sister
- Sugababes (original line up)
- Supergrass

=== Disbanded ===
- Arms Race
- Estrons
- The Good, the Bad & the Queen
- Mallory Knox
- Otherkin
- The Searchers
- Spandau Ballet
- The Spook School
- Superfood

== Classical works ==
- Thomas Adès – Concerto for Piano and Orchestra
- Sally Beamish – Nine Fragments (for string quartet)
- Michael Berkeley – Epitaphs of War
- Sir Harrison Birtwistle – Duet for 8 Strings (for viola and cello)
- Mark David Boden – Descent
- Jay Capperauld – Egalitair
- John Casken – Madonna of Silence (Trombone Concerto)
- Jonathan Dove
  - Accordion Concerto ('Northern Lights')
  - We Are One Fire
- David Fennessy – The Ground (commissioned by BBC; premièred on 12 January at Glasgow City Hall
- Helen Grime – Percussion Concerto
- Gavin Higgins – Book of Miracles (Trombone Concerto)
- Robin Holloway – Phaeton’s Journey: Son of the Sun (Trumpet Concerto)
- Dani Howard – Gates of Spring
- Emily Howard (music) and Michael Symmons Roberts (text) – The Anvil – An elegy for Peterloo
- Daniel Kidane – Woke
- John Woolrich – A Book of Inventions
- Nicholas Korth – Harmoniae Naturales VI
- Sir James MacMillan – Symphony No 5 ('Le grand Inconnu')
- Grace-Evangeline Mason – Midnight Spires
- Colin Matthews – Octet
- Tom Poster – The Turning Year
- André Previn and Tom Stoppard – Penelope
- Joby Talbot – A Sheen of Dew on Flowers
- Mark-Anthony Turnage – Massarosa (for bassoon and string quartet)
- Huw Watkins – The Moon
- Ryan Wigglesworth – Piano Concerto
- Scott Wilson – À Mezza Voce
- John Woolrich – A Book of Inventions

== Opera ==
- Iain Bell and Mark Campbell – Stonewall
- Iain Bell and Emma Jenkins – The Women of Whitechapel
- Gavin Higgins and Francesca Simon – The Monstrous Child
- Dani Howard (music), Zoe Palmer and Rebecca Hurst (libretto) – Robin Hood
- Stuart MacRae and Louise Welsh – Anthropocene
- Gabriel Prokofiev and David Pountney – Elizabetta
- Philip Venables and Ted Huffman – Denis & Katya

== Musical theatre ==
- Only Fools and Horses The Musical, by Paul Whitehouse and Jim Sullivan, with additional music by Chas Hodges and John Sullivan

== Musical films ==
- Blinded by the Light, starring Hayley Atwell and Kulvinder Ghir, with music by Bruce Springsteen.
- Cats, starring James Corden, Idris Elba, Ian McKellen and Judi Dench, with music by Andrew Lloyd Webber, due for release on 20 December.
- Rocketman, starring Taron Egerton, produced by Elton John, David Furnish and Matthew Vaughn
- Yesterday, starring Himesh Patel and Ed Sheeran, with songs by Paul McCartney and John Lennon

== Film scores and incidental music ==
=== Film ===
- Soumik Datta – Around India with a Movie Camera
- Steven Price – Wonder Park
- Vik Sharma & Graham Coxon – Fighting with My Family

=== Television ===
- David Arnold – Good Omens
- Ewen Henderson – Sanditon
- Dominik Scherrer – The Widow

== British music awards ==
- Brit Awards – see 2019 Brit Awards

== Charts and sales ==
=== Number-one singles ===
The singles chart includes a proportion for streaming.

Key
†	Best performing single of the year

Chart date (week ending)	Song	Artist(s)	Chart sales	References
3 January	"Sweet but Psycho"	Ava Max	65,156	
10 January	"Sweet but Psycho"	Ava Max	71,139	
17 January	"Sweet but Psycho"	Ava Max	68,320	
24 January	"Sweet but Psycho"	Ava Max	70,721	
31 January	"7 Rings"	Ariana Grande	126,240	
7 February	"7 Rings"	Ariana Grande	86,143	
14 February	"7 Rings"	Ariana Grande	71,909	
21 February	"Break Up with Your Girlfriend, I'm Bored"	Ariana Grande	84,701	
28 February	"7 Rings"	Ariana Grande	61,891	
7 March	"Someone You Loved" †	Lewis Capaldi	57,698	
14 March	"Someone You Loved" †	Lewis Capaldi	65,216	
21 March	"Someone You Loved" †	Lewis Capaldi	62,336	
28 March	"Someone You Loved" †	Lewis Capaldi	65,177	
4 April	"Someone You Loved" †	Lewis Capaldi	66,725	
11 April	"Someone You Loved" †	Lewis Capaldi	63,990	
18 April	"Someone You Loved" †	Lewis Capaldi	69,076	
25 April	"Old Town Road"	Lil Nas X	80,314	
2 May	"Old Town Road"	Lil Nas X	84,648	
9 May	"Vossi Bop"	Stormzy	94,495	
16 May	"Vossi Bop"	Stormzy	84,646	
23 May	"I Don't Care"	Ed Sheeran and Justin Bieber	123,825	
30 May	"I Don't Care"	Ed Sheeran and Justin Bieber	98,270	
6 June	"I Don't Care"	Ed Sheeran and Justin Bieber	83,477	
13 June	"I Don't Care"	Ed Sheeran and Justin Bieber	78,206	
20 June	"I Don't Care"	Ed Sheeran and Justin Bieber	67,959	
27 June	"I Don't Care"	Ed Sheeran and Justin Bieber	65,420	
4 July	"I Don't Care"	Ed Sheeran and Justin Bieber	65,002	
11 July	"I Don't Care"	Ed Sheeran and Justin Bieber	63,836	
18 July	"Señorita"	Shawn Mendes and Camila Cabello	69,321	
25 July	"Beautiful People"	Ed Sheeran featuring Khalid	73,397	
1 August	"Señorita"	Shawn Mendes and Camila Cabello	68,159	
8 August	"Señorita"	Shawn Mendes and Camila Cabello	61,712	
15 August	"Señorita"	Shawn Mendes and Camila Cabello	58,597	
22 August	"Señorita"	Shawn Mendes and Camila Cabello	54,934	
29 August	"Señorita"	Shawn Mendes and Camila Cabello	53,157	
5 September	"Take Me Back to London"	Ed Sheeran featuring Stormzy	66,953	
12 September	"Take Me Back to London"	Ed Sheeran featuring Stormzy	66,610	
19 September	"Take Me Back to London"	Ed Sheeran featuring Stormzy	59,683	
26 September	"Take Me Back to London"	Ed Sheeran featuring Stormzy	58,783	
3 October	"Take Me Back to London"	Ed Sheeran featuring Stormzy	53,251	
10 October	"Dance Monkey"	Tones and I	50,468	
17 October	"Dance Monkey"	Tones and I	70,713	
24 October	"Dance Monkey"	Tones and I	84,580	
31 October	"Dance Monkey"	Tones and I	81,198	
7 November	"Dance Monkey"	Tones and I	85,820	
14 November	"Dance Monkey"	Tones and I	84,488	
21 November	"Dance Monkey"	Tones and I	82,944	
28 November	"Dance Monkey"	Tones and I	82,796	
5 December	"Dance Monkey"	Tones and I	80,230	
12 December	"Dance Monkey"	Tones and I	75,075	
19 December	"Dance Monkey"	Tones and I	68,165	
26 December	"I Love Sausage Rolls"	LadBaby	92,896	

=== Number-one albums ===
The albums chart includes a proportion for streaming.

Key
†	Best performing album of the year

Chart date (week ending)	Album	Artist(s)	Chart sales	References
3 January	The Greatest Showman	Various artists	61,328	
10 January	The Greatest Showman	Various artists	40,901	
17 January	The Greatest Showman	Various artists	30,364	
24 January	The Greatest Showman	Various artists	28,879	
31 January	The Greatest Showman	Various artists	22,435	
7 February	Amo	Bring Me the Horizon	26,934	
14 February	Encore	The Specials	18,199	
21 February	thank u, next	Ariana Grande	65,214	
28 February	thank u, next	Ariana Grande	31,404	
7 March	thank u, next	Ariana Grande	21,659	
14 March	What a Time to Be Alive	Tom Walker	36,679	
21 March	Psychodrama	Dave	26,390	
28 March	Singing to Strangers	Jack Savoretti	32,264	
4 April	Coming Home to You	Michael Ball	18,039	
11 April	When We All Fall Asleep, Where Do We Go?	Billie Eilish	48,410	
18 April	When We All Fall Asleep, Where Do We Go?	Billie Eilish	23,982	
25 April	Map of the Soul: Persona	BTS	26,498	
2 May	When We All Fall Asleep, Where Do We Go?	Billie Eilish	15,134	
9 May	Hurts 2B Human	Pink	48,861	
16 May	Hurts 2B Human	Pink	16,713	
23 May	Hurts 2B Human	Pink	11,582	
30 May	Divinely Uninspired to a Hellish Extent †	Lewis Capaldi	89,506	
6 June	Divinely Uninspired to a Hellish Extent †	Lewis Capaldi	39,741	
13 June	Divinely Uninspired to a Hellish Extent †	Lewis Capaldi	29,429	
20 June	Divinely Uninspired to a Hellish Extent †	Lewis Capaldi	27,590	
27 June	Western Stars	Bruce Springsteen	52,290	
4 July	Divinely Uninspired to a Hellish Extent †	Lewis Capaldi	19,003	
11 July	Step Back in Time: The Definitive Collection	Kylie Minogue	31,980	
18 July	Divinely Uninspired to a Hellish Extent †	Lewis Capaldi	18,491	
25 July	No.6 Collaborations Project	Ed Sheeran and Various Artists	125,031	
1 August	No.6 Collaborations Project	Ed Sheeran and Various Artists	60,902	
8 August	No.6 Collaborations Project	Ed Sheeran and Various Artists	41,372	
15 August	No.6 Collaborations Project	Ed Sheeran and Various Artists	32,114	
22 August	We Are Not Your Kind	Slipknot	31,828	
29 August	No.6 Collaborations Project	Ed Sheeran and Various Artists	23,611	
5 September	Lover	Taylor Swift	53,015	
12 September	Norman Fucking Rockwell!	Lana Del Rey	31,539	
19 September	Hollywood's Bleeding	Post Malone	33,728	
26 September	Hypersonic Missiles	Sam Fender	40,913	
3 October	Why Me? Why Not.	Liam Gallagher	68,327	
10 October	Abbey Road	The Beatles	34,680	
17 October	Without Fear	Dermot Kennedy	20,061	
24 October	Giants of All Sizes	Elbow	27,257	
31 October	Everything Not Saved Will Be Lost – Part 2	Foals	20,505	
7 November	Kind	Stereophonics	29,844	
14 November	From Out of Nowhere	Jeff Lynne's ELO	21,062	
21 November	Sunsets & Full Moons	The Script	31,946	
28 November	Spectrum	Westlife	62,621	
5 December	Everyday Life	Coldplay	80,974	
12 December	The Christmas Present	Robbie Williams	52,909	
19 December	You're in My Heart	Rod Stewart	44,776	
26 December	You're in My Heart	Rod Stewart	71,330	

=== Number-one compilation albums ===
Chart date (week ending)	Album	Chart sales	References
3 January	Now 101		
10 January	Now 101		
17 January	Now 101		
24 January	Now 101		
31 January	Now 101		
7 February	Now 101		
14 February	80s Soul Jams – Vol II		
21 February	Now 101		
28 February	Now 101		
7 March	Now 100 Hits – 80s		
14 March	MTV Rocks – Indie Revolution		
21 March	Now 101		
28 March	Sing Your Heart Out 2019		
4 April	Country Forever		
11 April	Now 100 Hits – Power Ballards		
18 April	Now 100 Hits – Power Ballards		
25 April	Now 102		
2 May	Now 102		
9 May	Now 102		
16 May	Now 102		
23 May	Now 102		
30 May	Now 102		
6 June	Now 102		
13 June	Now 100 Hits – Forgotten 80s		
20 June	Now 100 Hits – Forgotten 80s		
27 June	Now 100 Hits – Forgotten 80s		
4 July	Now 102		
11 July	Now Summer Party 19		
18 July	Now Summer Party 19		
25 July	Reggae Summer Soundsystem		
1 August	Now 103		
8 August	Now 103		
15 August	Now 103		
22 August	Now 103		
29 August	Now 103		
5 September	Now 103		
12 September	Now 103		
19 September	Now 103		
26 September	Now 103		
3 October	Now 103		
10 October	Now 103		
17 October	Now 103		
24 October	Now 103		
31 October	Now 103		
7 November	Now 103		
14 November	BBC Children in Need – Got It Covered		
21 November	Now 104		
28 November	Now 104		
5 December	Now 104		
12 December	Now 104		
19 December	Now 104		
26 December	Now 104		

=== Top singles of the year ===
This chart was published by the Official Charts Company on 1 January 2020

Combined	Title	Artist(s)	Peak position	Combined
1	"Someone You Loved"	Lewis Capaldi	1	2,330,000
2	"Old Town Road"	Lil Nas X	1	1,750,000
3	"I Don't Care"	Ed Sheeran & Justin Bieber	1	1,490,000
4	"Bad Guy"	Billie Eilish	2	1,400,000
5	"Giant"	Calvin Harris & Rag'n'Bone Man	2	1,390,000
6	"Sweet but Psycho"	Ava Max	1	1,250,000
7	"Vossi Bop"	Stormzy	1	1,140,000
8	"Dance Monkey"	Tones and I	1	1,120,000
9	"Don't Call Me Up"	Mabel	3	
10	"Señorita"	Shawn Mendes & Camila Cabello	1	1,070,000
11	"Piece of Your Heart"	Meduza featuring Goodboys	2	1,010,000
12	"Shotgun"	George Ezra	7 (Note: Reached number 1 in 2018)	
13	"Location"	Dave featuring Burna Boy	6	
14	"Hold Me While You Wait"	Lewis Capaldi	4	
15	"Sunflower"	Post Malone & Swae Lee	3	
16	"7 rings"	Ariana Grande	1	
17	"Wow"	Post Malone	3	
18	"Ladbroke Grove"	AJ Tracey	3	
19	"Just You and I"	Tom Walker	3	
20	"Shallow"	Lady Gaga & Bradley Cooper	11 (Note: Reached number 1 in 2018)	837,000
21	"Beautiful People"	Ed Sheeran featuring Khalid	1	
22	"Dancing with a Stranger"	Sam Smith & Normani	3	
23	"Take Me Back to London"	Ed Sheeran featuring Stormzy	1	
24	"3 Nights"	Dominic Fike	3	
25	"Bruises"	Lewis Capaldi	6	
26	"Higher Love"	Kygo & Whitney Houston	2	
27	"Grace"	Lewis Capaldi	9	
28	"Nothing Breaks Like a Heart"	Mark Ronson featuring Miley Cyrus	2	
29	"Sucker"	Jonas Brothers	4	
30	"thank u, next"	Ariana Grande	2 (Note: Reached number 1 in 2018)	
31	"High Hopes"	Panic! at the Disco	37 (Note: Reached number 12 in 2018)	
32	"Options"	NSG featuring Tion Wayne	7	
33	"break up with your girlfriend, i'm bored"	Ariana Grande	1	
34	"SOS"	Avicii featuring Aloe Blacc	6	
35	"Keisha & Becky"	Russ & Tion Wayne	7	
36	"Bury a Friend"	Billie Eilish	6	
37	"Happier"	Marshmello & Bastille	26 (Note: Reached number 2 in 2018)	
38	"Ride It"	Regard	2	
39	"Strike a Pose"	Young T & Bugsey featuring Aitch	9	
40	"Without Me"	Halsey	10 (Note: Reached number 3 in 2018)	
41	"Sorry"	Joel Corry	6	
42	"Eastside"	Benny Blanco, Halsey & Khalid	29 (Note: Reached number 1 in 2018)	
43	"Talk"	Khalid	9	
44	"Cross Me"	Ed Sheeran featuring Chance the Rapper & PnB Rock	4	
45	"Taste (Make It Shake)"	Aitch	2	
46	"Perfect"	Ed Sheeran	40 (Note: Reached number 1 in 2017)	
47	"Promises"	Calvin Harris & Sam Smith	21 (Note: Reached number 1 in 2018)	
48	"Baby Shark"	Pinkfong	6	
49	"Wish You Well"	Sigala & Becky Hill	8	
50	"Boasty"	Wiley, Stefflon Don & Sean Paul featuring Idris Elba	11	
51	"Thursday"	Jess Glynne	13 (Note: Reached number 3 in 2018)	
52	"All Day and Night"	Jax Jones, Martin Solveig & Madison Beer	10	
53	"Ransom"	Lil Tecca	7	
54	"This Is Me"	Keala Settle and Ensemble	16 (Note: Reached number 3 in 2018)	
55	"South of the Border"	Ed Sheeran featuring Camila Cabello & Cardi B	4	
56	"Here with Me"	Marshmello featuring Chvrches	9	
57	"Walk Me Home"	Pink	8	
58	"Mad Love"	Mabel	8	
59	"So High"	Mist featuring Fredo	7	
60	"Lost Without You"	Freya Ridings	9	
61	"Leave a Light On"	Tom Walker	31 (Note: Reached number 7 in 2018)	
62	"How Do You Sleep?"	Sam Smith	7	
63	"Mr. Brightside"	The Killers	54 (Note: Reached number 10 in 2004)	
64	"Bohemian Rhapsody"	Queen	48 (Note: Reached number 1 in 1975)	
65	"Body"	Loud Luxury featuring Brando	39 (Note: Reached number 4 in 2018)	
66	"Circles"	Post Malone	3	
67	"No Guidance"	Chris Brown featuring Drake	6	
68	"Good as Hell"	Lizzo	7	
69	"Outnumbered"	Dermot Kennedy	6	
70	"One Kiss"	Calvin Harris & Dua Lipa	22 (Note: Reached number 1 in 2018)	
71	"ME!"	Taylor Swift featuring Brendon Urie	3	
72	"I'm So Tired..."	Lauv & Troye Sivan	8	
73	"Fashion Week"	Steel Banglez featuring AJ Tracey & MoStack	7	
74	"When the Party's Over"	Billie Eilish	61 (Note: Reached number 21 in 2018)	
75	"Sicko Mode"	Travis Scott	33 (Note: Reached number 9 in 2018)	
76	"Shape of You"	Ed Sheeran	82 (Note: Reached number 1 in 2017)	
77	"Hold My Girl"	George Ezra	8	
78	"Funky Friday"	Dave featuring Fredo	38 (Note: Reached number 1 in 2018)	
79	"Goodbyes"	Post Malone featuring Young Thug	5	
80	"Paradise"	George Ezra	46 (Note: Reached number 2 in 2018)	
81	"Going Bad"	Meek Mill featuring Drake	13	
82	"So Am I"	Ava Max	13	
83	"If I Can't Have You"	Shawn Mendes	9	
84	"All I Want for Christmas Is You"	Mariah Carey	2 (Note: Reached number 1 in 2020)	
85	"These Days"	Rudimental featuring Jess Glynne, Macklemore & Dan Caplen	53 (Note: Reached number 1 in 2018)	

=== Best-selling albums ===
No.	Title	Artist	Peak position	Combined sales
1	Divinely Uninspired to a Hellish Extent	Lewis Capaldi	1	641,000
2	No.6 Collaborations Project	Ed Sheeran	1	568,000
3	The Greatest Showman	Various artists	1	524,000
4	When We All Fall Asleep, Where Do We Go?	Billie Eilish	1	370,000
5	Staying at Tamara's	George Ezra	2 (Note: Reached number 1 in 2018)	
6	Bohemian Rhapsody: The Original Soundtrack	Queen	3	
7	thank u, next	Ariana Grande	1	293,000
8	What a Time to Be Alive	Tom Walker	1	270,000
9	A Star Is Born	Lady Gaga and Bradley Cooper	3 (Note: Reached number 1 in 2018)	
10	You're in My Heart: Rod Stewart with the Royal Philharmonic Orchestra	Rod Stewart with the Royal Philharmonic Orchestra	1	
11	÷	Ed Sheeran	6 (Note: Reached number 1 in 2017)	
12	The Christmas Present	Robbie Williams	1	
13	50 Years – Don't Stop	Fleetwood Mac	5	
14	Everyday Life	Coldplay	1	
15	Diamonds	Elton John	6 (Note: Reached number 2 in 2023)	
16	Always In Between	Jess Glynne	5 (Note: Reached number 1 in 2018)	
17	The Platinum Collection	Queen	8 (Note: Reached number 2 in 2000)	
18	Don't Smile at Me	Billie Eilish	12	
19	Dua Lipa	Dua Lipa	9 (Note: Reached number 3 in 2018)	
20	Hollywood's Bleeding	Post Malone	1	
21	Back Together	Michael Ball and Alfie Boe	2	
22	Psychodrama	Dave	1	
23	Hurts 2B Human	Pink	1	
24	Lover	Taylor Swift	1	
25	Beerbongs & Bentleys	Post Malone	13 (Note: Reached number 1 in 2018)	
26	Why Me? Why Not.	Liam Gallagher	1	
27	Scorpion	Drake	16 (Note: Reached number 1 in 2018)	
28	Singing to Strangers	Jack Savoretti	1	
29	Spectrum	Westlife	1	
30	Rumours	Fleetwood Mac	17 (Note: Reached number 1 in 1978)	
31	Curtain Call: The Hits	Eminem	27 (Note: Reached number 1 in 2005)	
32	ABBA Gold: Greatest Hits	ABBA	27 (Note: Reached number 1 in 1992)	
33	Christmas	Michael Bublé	2 (Note: Reached number 1 in 2011)	
34	Snacks	Jax Jones	9	
35	Western Stars	Bruce Springsteen	1	
36	What Is Love?	Clean Bandit	9	
37	Time Flies... 1994–2009	Oasis	25 (Note: Reached number 1 in 2010)	
38	Abbey Road	The Beatles	1	
39	Mamma Mia! Here We Go Again: The Movie Soundtrack	Various artists	7 (Note: Reached number 1 in 2018)	
40	Hypersonic Missiles	Sam Fender	1	
41	×	Ed Sheeran	18 (Note: Reached number 1 in 2014)	
42	AJ Tracey	AJ Tracey	3	
43	Legacy	David Bowie	27 (Note: Reached number 5 in 2017)	
44	Odyssey	Take That	3 (Note: Reached number 1 in 2018)	
45	Phoenix	Rita Ora	16 (Note: Reached number 11 in 2018)	
46	Erratic Cinematic	Gerry Cinnamon	17	
47	Direct Hits	The Killers	5	
48	Legend	Bob Marley and the Wailers	32 (Note: Reached number 1 in 1984)	
49	1	The Beatles	21 (Note: Reached number 1 in 2000)	
50	Sweetener	Ariana Grande	16 (Note: Reached number 1 in 2018)	
51	Step Back in Time: The Definitive Collection	Kylie Minogue	1	
52	You Know I Know	Olly Murs	10 (Note: Reached number 2 in 2018)	
53	(What's the Story) Morning Glory?	Oasis	41 (Note: Reached number 1 in 1995)	
54	A Brief Inquiry into Online Relationships	The 1975	10 (Note: Reached number 1 in 2018)	
55	?	XXXTentacion	31 (Note: Reached number 3 in 2018)	

== Deaths ==
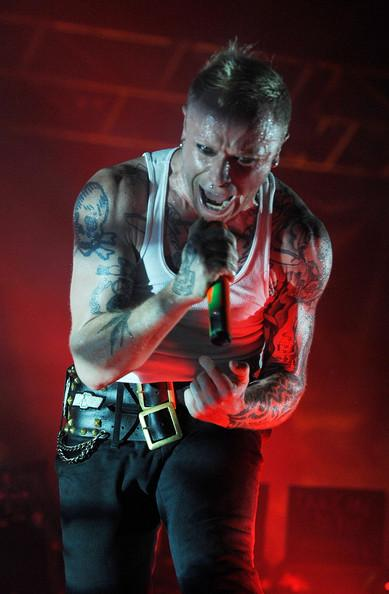
Keith Flint

- 1 January – Dean Ford, singer, songwriter and musician with Marmalade, 72 (Parkinson's disease)
- 3 January – Donald Froud, orchestral administrator and French horn player, and first general manager of the Ulster Orchestra, 86
- 7 January – John Joubert, South Africa-born composer, 91
- 19 January – Ted McKenna, drummer (The Sensational Alex Harvey Band), 68 (cerebral haemorrhage)
- 28 January – Noel Rawsthorne, organist, 89
- 6 February – Gerald English, tenor, 93
- 9 February – Cadet, rapper, 28 (car accident)
- 25 February – Mark Hollis, 64, singer and songwriter (Talk Talk) (death reported on this date)
- 26 February – Andy Anderson, 68, rock drummer (cancer)
- 28 February – André Previn KBE, conductor (past principal conductor of the London Symphony Orchestra and music director of the Royal Philharmonic Orchestra), composer, and pianist, 89
- 1 March – Paul Williams, singer, 78
- 3 March – Peter Hurford, organist and composer, 88
- 4 March – Keith Flint, singer, musician (The Prodigy), 49
- 6 March – Grayston Burgess, countertenor and conductor, 86
- 19 March – Anthony Hedges, composer, 88
- 26 March – Ranking Roger, ska musician, 56 (cancer)
- 27 March – Stephen Fitzpatrick, singer and musician (Her's), 24 (road accident)
- 8 April – Sue Revill, classical record company financial administrator, 63
- 15 April – Les Reed, songwriter, 83
- 22 April – Heather Harper, soprano, 88
- 27 April – Joseph Ward, 76, English tenor
- 30 April – Boon Gould, English musician (Level 42), 64.
- 28 May – Ralph Murphy, 75, British-born Canadian country musician, cancer.
- 2 July – Duncan Lamont, 87, saxophonist, composer and bandleader
- 3 July – Alan Rogan, 68, English guitar technician (The Who), cancer.
- 16 July – Johnny Clegg, 66, British-born South African singer and musician (Juluka, Savuka), pancreatic cancer.
- 30 July – Lol Mason, 69, English singer (City Boy, The Maisonettes).
- 1 August – Ian Gibbons, 67, English keyboardist (The Kinks), bladder cancer.
- 3 August – Joe Longthorne, 64, English singer and entertainer, throat cancer.
- 11 August – Freddy Bannister, 84, English rock concert promoter, cancer.
- 20 August – Timmy Walsh, English guitarist, (Northside), 51, suicide (death announced in 2020).
- 25 August – Jonathan Goldstein, 50, English composer, plane crash.
- 7 September – Volodymyr Luciv, 90, Ukrainian-born British bandurist and tenor.
- 14 September – Julian Piper, 72, English blues guitarist.
- 18 September – Tony Mills, 57, English rock singer (Shy, TNT), pancreatic cancer.
- 19 September – Larry Wallis, 70, English musician (Pink Fairies, Motörhead).
- 6 October – Ginger Baker, 80, English drummer (Cream, Blind Faith, Ginger Baker's Air Force).
- 8 October – Molly Duncan, 74, saxophonist (Average White Band), cancer.
- 22 November – Sir Stephen Cleobury, 70, English organist, director of the Choir of King's College, Cambridge, since 1982
- 24 November – Colin Mawby, 83, English organist, choral conductor and composer
- 27 November – Sir Jonathan Miller, British theatre and opera director, satirist, and physician, 85
- 28 November – Christopher Finzi, British conductor and son of Gerald Finzi, 85
- 7 December – Simon Streatfeild, 90, conductor and violist
- 29 December
  - Susanne Beer, German-born orchestral cellist resident in the United Kingdom and principal cello of the London Philharmonic Orchestra, 52
  - Neil Innes, 75, singer, musician, writer (Bonzo Dog Doo-Dah Band), (The Rutles)

== See also ==
- 2019 in British radio
- 2019 in British television
- 2019 in the United Kingdom
