= Staying at Tamara's =

Studio album by George Ezra
- Released: 23 March 2018
- Recorded: 2017–18
- Studios: Voltaire Road, Clapham, London
- Genres: Folk pop; stadium rock; indie folk
- Length: 37:13
- Label: Columbia
- Producers: Cam Blackwood; Joel Pott; Fred

George Ezra chronology
Wanted on Voyage (2014)	Staying at Tamara's (2018)	Gold Rush Kid (2022)

Singles from Staying at Tamara's
- 1. "Don't Matter Now" Released: 16 June 2017; 2. "Paradise" Released: 19 January 2018; 3. "Shotgun" Released: 18 May 2018; 4. "Hold My Girl" Released: 28 September 2018; 5. "Pretty Shining People" Released: 8 March 2019

Staying at Tamara's is the second studio album by English singer-songwriter George Ezra. It was released on 23 March 2018. The album reached number one in the UK as well as the top ten of several other countries including Australia and New Zealand. The album includes the singles "Paradise" and "Shotgun", which peaked at number two and number one on the UK Singles Chart, respectively.

It was the UK's best-selling artist album of the year in 2018 and was nominated for British Album of the Year at the 2019 Brit Awards.

In support of the album, Ezra embarked on a 2018 world tour entitled, Staying at Tamara's Tour, mostly visiting cities across North America and Europe.

== Background ==
Ezra finished touring his debut album Wanted on Voyage (2014) in December 2016. Following this, he realised "he had to write another record". He went to Barcelona for a month, but instead of booking a hotel or apartment, he found a stranger on the Internet whose name was Tamara. "[She] was renting her spare room," he told The Sydney Morning Herald. "I thought, if she's a bit crazy, if she's a bit unhinged, I can just leave. Her friends were all musicians, artists and designers and her apartment really felt like their HQ. It helped slow me down. There was a point about halfway through the trip where I was like, this trip has proved to be really important ... and the album's name came to me like that. I love it."

== Singles ==
Five singles have been released from the album. "Don't Matter Now" was released as the lead single on 16 June 2017. It was a moderate success in Belgium, Iceland and the Netherlands and gave Ezra his seventh top 75 entry on the UK Singles Chart. The second single released from the album was "Paradise", which peaked at number two, being kept off the top spot by Rudimental's "These Days". It also reached the top ten in Ireland, Belgium, Austria and Scotland.

"Shotgun" was released as the third single from the album on 18 May 2018; it reached number one on the UK Singles Chart on 29 June 2018 and gave Ezra his first UK number-one single. "Hold My Girl" was released as the fourth single from the album in late-September. "Pretty Shining People" was released as the fifth single in early-March.

=== Promotional singles ===
"Pretty Shining People" was released as the first promotional single from the album on 2 March 2018; it reached number 54 on the UK Singles Chart.The track was later selected as the album's fifth single in March 2019. "Hold My Girl" was released as the second and final promotional single on 9 March 2018, and reached number 81 on the UK Singles Chart. The track was later selected as the album's fourth single, and impacted radio in September 2018.

== Critical reception ==
Professional ratings
Aggregate scores
Source	Rating
Metacritic	61/100
Review scores
Source	Rating
DIY	4/5 stars
Dork	4/5 stars
God is in the TV	8/10 stars
The Guardian	3/5 stars
musicOMH	2.5/5 stars
NME	4/5 stars
The Observer	3/5 stars
The Times	3/5 stars

At Metacritic, which assigns a normalised rating out of 100 to reviews from mainstream critics, the album has an average score of 61 based on seven reviews, indicating "generally favorable reviews".

== Track listing ==
All tracks are written by George Ezra Barnett and Joel Pott, except where noted.

No.	Title	Length
1.	"Pretty Shining People" (Barnett)	3:32
2.	"Don't Matter Now"	2:56
3.	"Get Away"	2:34
4.	"Shotgun" (Barnett, Pott, Fred Gibson)	3:21
5.	"Paradise" (Barnett)	3:42
6.	"All My Love"	2:40
7.	"Sugarcoat"	3:22
8.	"Hold My Girl"	3:31
9.	"Saviour" (featuring First Aid Kit)	3:32
10.	"Only a Human"	3:34
11.	"The Beautiful Dream"	4:29
Total length:		37:20

== Personnel ==
Musicians

- George Ezra – vocals, guitar (all tracks); keyboards (tracks 1, 3–11), bass guitar (1, 3–7, 11); percussion, synthesizer (2); harmonium (3), drums (7)
- Cam Blackwood – programming, synthesizer (all tracks); guitar (1–4, 6–11), percussion (1, 3, 5–11), piano (1, 5), bass guitar (1, 8, 9), keyboards (1), vocals (2, 3, 8), organ (2), background vocals (4, 6, 11), performance arrangement (8, 10), strings (8)
- Matthew Racher – drums, percussion, programming (all tracks); background vocals (6)
- Dan Grech-Marguerat – programming (tracks 1–7, 9–11)
- Liam Thorne – percussion (tracks 1, 3–6), programming (2, 4–6, 9–11), synthesizer (2), vocals (2)
- Florrie Arnold – vocals (tracks 2, 4, 5, 7, 11), drums (5), vocals (11)
- The Atlantic Horns – brass (tracks 2, 4)
- Billie Marten – vocals (track 2)
- Joel Pott – background vocals (tracks 3, 4, 6, 7)
- Rob Blackham – background vocals (track 3)
- Jamie Sefton – flute (tracls 3, 10); flugelhorn, trombone, trumpet (3)
- James Wyatt – organ (track 4), piano (8)
- Ollie Hodge – background vocals (track 4)
- Fred – bass guitar, drums, keyboards (track 4)
- Emma Corby – brass (track 4)
- Jaleesa Gemerts – drums (track 4)
- Daniel Thomas – background vocals (track 6)
- Derek Green – background vocals (track 6)
- Juliet Roberts – background vocals (track 6)
- Mary Pearce – background vocals (track 6)
- Rebecca Goulding – background vocals (track 6)
- Sylvia Mason – background vocals (track 6)
- Dan Caplen – cello (track 8)
- Davide Rossi – performance arrangement (track 8)
- First Aid Kit – background vocals (track 9)
- Duncan Eagles – alto saxophone, baritone saxophone, soprano saxophone, tenor saxophone (track 10)
- Jimmy Sims – bass guitar (track 10)
- Rae Morris – piano (track 10)

Technical

- Cam Blackwood – production (all tracks), engineering (tracks 2, 6)
- Fred – production (track 8)
- Dave Kutch – mastering
- Dan Grech-Marguerat – mixing (tracks 1–7, 9–11)
- Michael H. Brauer – mixing (track 8)
- Liam Thorne – engineering
- Dan Trachtenberg – engineering (track 4)
- Jon Bailey – engineering (track 6)
- Fernando Reyes – engineering (track 8)
- Steve Vealey – engineering (track 8)
- Charles Hicks – mixing assistance (1–7, 9–11)
- Joel Davies – mixing assistance (1–7, 9–11)
- Fiona Cruickshank – engineering assistance (track 6)

Visuals

- Steve Stacey – design
- Alex Eden-Smith – photography

== Charts ==
=== Weekly charts ===
Chart (2018–19)	Peak position
Australian Albums (ARIA)	7
Austrian Albums (Ö3 Austria)	6
Belgian Albums (Ultratop Flanders)	19
Belgian Albums (Ultratop Wallonia)	50
Croatian International Albums (HDU)	23
Czech Albums (ČNS IFPI)	23
Danish Albums (Hitlisten)	7
Dutch Albums (Album Top 100)	7
French Albums (SNEP)	40
German Albums (Offizielle Top 100)	10
Irish Albums (IRMA)	2
Italian Albums (FIMI)	57
New Zealand Albums (RMNZ)	7
Norwegian Albums (VG-lista)	27
Scottish Albums (Official Charts)	1
Spanish Albums (Promusicae)	99
Swedish Albums (Sverigetopplistan)	25
Swiss Albums (Schweizer Hitparade)	6
UK Albums (Official Charts)	1
US Billboard 200	68

=== Year-end charts ===
Chart (2018)	Position
Australian Albums (ARIA)	40
Austrian Albums (Ö3 Austria)	50
Belgian Albums (Ultratop Flanders)	58
Danish Albums (Hitlisten)	51
Dutch Albums (MegaCharts)	69
German Albums (Offizielle Top 100)	54
Irish Albums (IRMA)	4
New Zealand Albums (RMNZ)	43
Swedish Albums (Sverigetopplistan)	77
Swiss Albums (Schweizer Hitparade)	66
UK Albums (OCC)	2

Chart (2019)	Position
Australian Albums (ARIA)	44
Belgian Albums (Ultratop Flanders)	60
Danish Albums (Hitlisten)	63
Dutch Albums (Album Top 100)	71
Irish Albums (IRMA)	9
New Zealand Albums (RMNZ)	36
Swedish Albums (Sverigetopplistan)	89
UK Albums (OCC)	5

Chart (2020)	Position
Belgian Albums (Ultratop Flanders)	193
UK Albums (OCC)	43

Chart (2022)	Position
UK Albums (OCC)	72

=== Decade-end charts ===
Chart (2010–2019)	Position
UK Albums (OCC)	49

== Certifications ==
Certifications for Staying at Tamara's
Region	Certification	Certified units/sales
Australia (ARIA)	Platinum	70,000^{‡}
Canada (Music Canada)	Gold	40,000^{‡}
Denmark (IFPI Danmark)	2× Platinum	40,000^{‡}
France (SNEP)	Gold	50,000^{‡}
Germany (BVMI)	Gold	100,000^{‡}
Italy (FIMI)	Gold	25,000^{‡}
New Zealand (RMNZ)	3× Platinum	45,000^{‡}
Poland (ZPAV)	Platinum	20,000^{‡}
United Kingdom (BPI)	4× Platinum	1,200,000^{‡}
^{‡} Sales+streaming figures based on certification alone.

== See also ==
- List of 2018 albums
- List of UK Albums Chart number ones of the 2010s
