= Pretty Shining People =

Single by George Ezra

from the album Staying at Tamara's
- Released: 8 March 2019
- Recorded: 2017
- Length: 3:32
- Label: Columbia; Sony Music
- Songwriter: George Ezra
- Producer: Cam Blackwood

George Ezra singles chronology
"Hold My Girl" (2018)	"Pretty Shining People" (2019)	"Come on Home for Christmas" (2021)

"Pretty Shining People" is a song by English singer-songwriter George Ezra. The song was written by Ezra and produced by Cam Blackwood. It was released as a digital download on 2 March 2019, as the first promotional single from Ezra's second studio album Staying at Tamara's. The song peaked at number 25 on the UK Singles Chart and number 40 on the Irish Singles Chart. On 8 March 2019 it became the fifth single from the album.

== Critical reception ==
In a review for NME, Nick Reilly said, "Opener 'Happy Smiling [sic] People' sees Ezra anchoring an infectious chorus around dark and world-weary lyrics: "What a terrible time to be alive if you're prone to overthinking", he croons, before offering a message of upbeat and hearty resilience ("Hey pretty smiling people, we're alright together")."

== Music video ==
A lyric video to accompany the release of "Pretty Shining People" was first released onto YouTube on 2 March 2019 at a total length of three minutes and forty-one seconds.

The official music video, directed by Michael Cumming, was released on 8 March 2019. It begins with Ezra sitting nervously in a room labelled as "Record label HQ, London" while holding a white disk with "Pretty Shining People Demo George Ezra" written on it in permanent marker. A young girl then approaches Ezra, shakes his hand and takes him to another room. Ezra then begins auditioning the song in front of a table of young children who begin to take notes and appear to look unimpressed with Ezra's performance. The children then begin to softly lip sync the song. As Ezra begins performing the chorus, the scene changes to a young child in a suit presenting a presentation to the children from the previous scene. The presentation covers topics such as Ezra's interests; these are jigsaws, metal detecting, trains and badminton, Ezra's genre and Ezra's personality, which is labelled as "BORING". The scene then returns to Ezra looking confused that the children aren't impressed by his audition. The scene then changes to Ezra in a suit and two children in a room called the "smile chamber" where Ezra is shown a card with different smiles that he has to then copy as photographers take photographs of him. Similarly to his audition, the children are not impressed with Ezra's efforts and one child begins to help him adjust his smile. The scene then returns to the presentation, this time about Ezra's image with a bar chart with the labels "catchiness" and "edginess". The bars begin to increase and decrease melodically and the word "EDGINESS" appears on the presentation screen. The scene then changes to Ezra trying on different outfits as two of the children continue to lip sync the song and look unimpressed by Ezra's original clothing. He then comes out wearing a camouflage tracksuit which is approved by the children. The scene is then changed to a room called the "Dance Zone" where Ezra, in the tracksuit, is dancing to the song with some of the children. It then returns to Ezra's audition, where the children are still not impressed. Slowly, however, the children get into the song and eventually get up and begin jumping, singing and dancing. The scene then changes repeatedly between Ezra's audition, Ezra taking a selfie with two girls, a young boy showcasing some possible Ezra album cover ideas and two young boys dressing Ezra with a man bag. Ezra's audition then ends and the children applaud him. The video then ends with a short clip of Ezra signing a recording contract.

== Track listing ==
Digital download
No.	Title	Length
1.	"Pretty Shining People"	3:32

== Charts ==
=== Weekly charts ===
Chart (2018–19)	Peak position
Belgium (Ultratop 50 Flanders)	15
Belgium (Ultratip Bubbling Under Wallonia)	11
Czech Republic Airplay (ČNS IFPI)	99
Ireland (IRMA)	40
Netherlands (Dutch Top 40)	28
New Zealand Hot Singles (RMNZ)	15
Scotland Singles (Official Charts)	12
Slovakia Airplay (ČNS IFPI)	70
UK Singles (Official Charts)	25

=== Year-end charts ===
Chart (2019)	Position
Belgium (Ultratop Flanders)	65

== Certifications ==
Region	Certification	Certified units/sales
New Zealand (RMNZ)	Gold	15,000^{‡}
South Africa (RISA)	Platinum	20,000^{‡}
United Kingdom (BPI)	Platinum	600,000^{‡}
^{‡} Sales+streaming figures based on certification alone.

== Release history ==
Region	Date	Format	Label
United Kingdom	2 March 2018	Digital download	Columbia; Sony Music
Australia	14 June 2019	Contemporary Hit Radio	Columbia; Sony Music
