= Let Me Live (Rudimental and Major Lazer song) =

Single by Rudimental and Major Lazer featuring Anne-Marie and Mr Eazi

from the album Toast to Our Differences
- Released: 15 June 2018
- Recorded: 2018
- Length: 3:25
- Label: Asylum
- Songwriters: Thomas Wesley Pentz; Philip Meckseper; Jasper Helderman; Kesi Dryden; Piers Aggett; Amir Amor; Leon Rolle; Cesar Ovalle Jr.; Bas van Daalen; Oluwatosin Oluwole Ajibade; Anne-Marie
- Producers: Rudimental; Major Lazer

Rudimental singles chronology
"These Days" (2018)	"Let Me Live" (2018)	"Walk Alone" (2018)

Major Lazer singles chronology
"Loko" (2018)	"Let Me Live" (2018)	"All My Life" (2018)

Anne-Marie singles chronology
"2002" (2018)	"Let Me Live" (2018)	"Don't Leave Me Alone" (2018)

Mr Eazi singles chronology
"London Town" (2018)	"Let Me Live" (2018)	"Timkere" (2018)

"Let Me Live" is a song by English drum and bass band Rudimental and American DJ trio Major Lazer, featuring guest vocals from English singer Anne-Marie and Nigerian singer Mr Eazi. The song was released as a digital download on 15 June 2018, as the third single from Rudimental's third studio album, Toast to Our Differences (2019). The song was written by Thomas Pentz, Philip Meckseper, Jasper Helderman, Kesi Dryden, Piers Aggett, Amir Amor, Leon Rolle, Cesar Ovalle Jr., Bas van Daalen, Oluwatosin Oluwole Ajibade and Anne-Marie.

== Background ==
"We started this song when Mr Eazi came through London and did a session with us," the group told Clash Music. "We ended up changing the key and got Anne-Marie to the studio, which took the song to a whole new level. We then ended up sending it to our friends Major Lazer who flew to London to work with us on it. After that, we heard Ladysmith Black Mambazo were in town and they ended up recording the BVs in the middle eight. Again this track sums up the theme of the album - we have West African, South African, British and American influences on it. It's so much fun to play this one live!"

== Charts ==
=== Weekly charts ===
Chart (2018)	Peak position
Australia (ARIA)	77
Belgium (Ultratop 50 Flanders)	16
Belgium (Ultratop 50 Wallonia)	32
Croatia Airplay (HRT)	44
Ireland (IRMA)	43
Netherlands (Dutch Top 40)	28
Netherlands (Single Top 100)	73
Romania (Airplay 100)	54
Scotland Singles (OCC)	29
Slovakia (Rádio Top 100)	72
Sweden Heatseeker (Sverigetopplistan)	2
Switzerland (Schweizer Hitparade)	99
UK Singles (OCC)	42
UK Dance (OCC)	7
US Hot Dance/Electronic Songs (Billboard)	20

=== Year-end charts ===
Chart (2018)	Position
Belgium (Ultratop Flanders)	75
US Hot Dance/Electronic Songs (Billboard)	96

== Certifications ==
Region	Certification	Certified units/sales
Australia (ARIA)	Gold	35,000^{‡}
New Zealand (RMNZ)	Gold	15,000^{‡}
United Kingdom (BPI)	Silver	200,000^{‡}
^{‡} Sales+streaming figures based on certification alone.
