= I Am (Tom Walker album) =

Studio album by Tom Walker
- Released: 20 September 2024
- Length: 35:20
- Label: Relentless
- Producer: Cam Blackwood; Connor McDonough; Riley McDonough; Serban Cazan; Jacob Manson; Jim Abbiss; Patrick Salmy; Ricardo Muñoz; Rupert Christie; Ryan Daly; Stuart Price; Tom Walker

Tom Walker chronology
What a Time to Be Alive (2019)	I Am (2024)

Singles from I Am
- 1. "Wait for You" Released: 13 June 2020; 2. "The Best Is Yet to Come" Released: 13 October 2022; 3. "Burn" Released: 22 September 2023; 4. "Freaking Out" Released: 3 November 2023; 5. "Head Underwater" Released: 2 February 2024; 6. "Lifeline" Released: 29 March 2024; 7. "Holy Ghost" Released: 19 July 2024

I Am (stylized in all caps) is the second studio album by British singer-songwriter Tom Walker, released on 20 September 2024 through Relentless Records. The album peaked at number 1 on the Scottish Albums Chart and number 4 on the UK Albums Chart. It also landed at number 2 on the UK Albums Sales Chart.

== Background and release ==
Speaking about the album, Walker stated, “’I Am’ is a culmination of me trying to figure out who I am for the last four years. This record is a snapshot of what’s been going on in my life, and what’s been happening around me – what’s made me happy or sad, ecstatic or miserable.” He then declared, “I will die for these songs. It’s the first time in a long time I’ve felt like that. You’ve got to ignore what everyone else wants from you, and you’ve got to back yourself.”

Walker officially announced the album on 3 November 2023. The album was officially released on 20 September 2024, with an album launch tour in the United Kingdom shortly after.

== Critical reception ==
Professional ratings
Review scores
Source	Rating
Clash	8/10
The Upcoming	4/5 stars

Reviewing the album for Clash, Emma Harrison calls it "Confessional, visceral and emotional", and serves as "a fine follow up to ‘What a Time to Be Alive’ and in many respects transcends it, thanks to the sophisticated and impassioned songwriting and delivery." Writing for The Upcoming, Talitha Stowell admits that "The different sounds may be jarring for some and thrilling for others, but they certainly hold their own as individual tracks," and states that "'I Am' is a solid album, with Tom Walker diving deeper into himself than ever before and experimenting with sound."

== Track listing ==
No.	Title	Writer(s)	Producer(s)	Length
1.	"Holy Ghost"	Connor McDonough; Riley McDonough; Ryan Daly; Toby McDonough; Thomas Walker; Joel Castillo	Daly; Connor McDonough; Riley McDonough	2:38
2.	"Burn"	Connor McDonough; Riley McDonough; Daly; Toby McDonough; Walker; Castillo	Connor McDonough; Riley McDonough	2:21
3.	"Head Underwater"	Connor McDonough; Riley McDonough; Daly; Toby McDonough; Walker; Castillo	Connor McDonough; Daly	3:17
4.	"Freaking Out"	Walker; Jamie Hartman; Tofer Brown; Jon Green	Stuart Price	2:24
5.	"Kissed By God"	Connor McDonough; Riley McDonough; Daly	Toby Gad; Walker	3:06
6.	"Lifeline"	Toby McDonough; Riley McDonough; Connor McDonough; Daly; Walker; Castillo	Connor McDonough; Daly	2:55
7.	"I Am (Interlude)"	Walker	Walker; Daly; Connor McDonough; Riley McDonough	1:05
8.	"I Am"	Connor McDonough; Riley McDonough; Daly; Toby McDonough; Walker; Castillo	Daly; Connor McDonough; Riley McDonough	2:41
9.	"Echoes"	Gerard O'Connell; Serban Cazan; Walker	Jacob Manson; Cazan	2:50
10.	"Wait for You" (featuring Zoe Wees)	Patrick Salmy; Ricardo Muñoz; Cam Blackwood	Walker; Blackwood; Joel Pott	2:34
11.	"Stigma"	Walker	Jim Abbiss	3:09
12.	"SOS"	Walker	Rupert Christie	3:31
13.	"The Best Is Yet to Come"	Walker; Jez Ashursth	Walker	2:44
Total length:				35:20

== Charts ==
Chart performance for "I Am"
Chart (2024)	Peak position
Scottish Albums (OCC)	1
UK Albums (OCC)	4
UK Albums Sales Chart (OCC)	2
