= Walk Alone (song) =

Single by Rudimental featuring Tom Walker

from the album Toast to Our Differences and What a Time to Be Alive
- Released: 26 October 2018
- Recorded: May–August 2015
- Length: 3:25
- Label: Sony
- Songwriter(s): Amir Izadkhah; Piers Aggett; Kesi Dryden; Leon "DJ Locksmith" Rolle; Cass Lowe; Ilsey Juber; Dacoury Natche; Thomas Walker; Jesse Shatkin; Jonathan Mensah
- Producer(s): Rudimental; Mike Spencer; Shatkin; JAE5

Rudimental singles chronology
"Let Me Live" (2018)	"Walk Alone" (2018)	"Summer Love" (2018)

Tom Walker singles chronology
"Angels" (2018)	"Walk Alone" (2018)	"Just You and I" (2019)

"Walk Alone" is a song by British drum and bass band Rudimental, featuring vocals from British singer and songwriter Tom Walker. The song was released as a digital download on 26 October 2018, as the fourth single from Rudimental's third studio album, Toast to Our Differences. The song was written by Amir Izadkhah, Piers Aggett, Kesi Dryden, Leon "DJ Locksmith" Rolle, Cass Lowe, Ilsey Juber, Dacoury Natche, Thomas Walker, Jesse Shatkin and Jonathan Mensah. It's also included on Walker's debut album, What a Time to Be Alive.

== Music video ==
A music video to accompany the release of "Walk Alone" was first released onto YouTube on 1 November 2018. Filmed in Auckland, New Zealand, it follows two rugby players who develop a genuine friendship.

== Track listing ==
Digital download
No.	Title	Length
1.	"Walk Alone" (featuring Tom Walker)	3:25

Digital download
No.	Title	Length
1.	"Walk Alone" (featuring Tom Walker) (acoustic)	3:28

Digital download (Remixes)
No.	Title	Length
1.	"Walk Alone" (featuring Tom Walker) (Alle Farben remix)	3:13
2.	"Walk Alone" (featuring Tom Walker) (Nathan Dawe remix)	4:29
3.	"Walk Alone" (featuring Tom Walker) (Burak Yeter remix)	2:52
4.	"Walk Alone" (featuring Tom Walker) (YOUNOTUS remix)	3:13

== Charts ==
=== Weekly charts ===
Chart (2018–2019)	Peak position
Hungary (Rádiós Top 40)	30
Ireland (IRMA)	92
Scotland (OCC)	80
Slovakia (Rádio Top 100)	95
UK Singles (OCC)	80

=== Year-end charts ===
Chart (2019)	Position
Hungary (Rádiós Top 40)	63

== Certifications ==
Certifications for Walk Alone
Region	Certification	Certified units/sales
United Kingdom (BPI)	Silver	200,000^{‡}
^{‡} Sales+streaming figures based on certification alone.

== Release history ==
Region	Date	Format	Label
United Kingdom	26 October 2018	Digital download	Sony
