= Now You're Gone (Tom Walker song) =

Song by Tom Walker

Single by Tom Walker featuring Zara Larsson

from the album What a Time to Be Alive
- Released: 31 May 2019
- Length: 3:32
- Label: Relentless Records
- Songwriters: Tom Walker; Chelcee Grimes; Steve McCutcheon
- Producer: Steve Mac

Tom Walker singles chronology
"Not Giving In" (2019)	"Now You're Gone" (2019)	"Better Half of Me" (2019)

Zara Larsson singles chronology
"Don't Worry Bout Me" (2019)	"Now You're Gone" (2019)	"A Brand New Day" (2019)

Music videos
- "Now You're Gone" on YouTube; "Now You're Gone" (Acoustic version) on YouTube

"Now You're Gone" is a song by Scottish singer-songwriter Tom Walker featuring vocals from Swedish singer Zara Larsson. The song was released as a digital download on 31 May 2019 as the seventh single from his debut studio album What a Time to Be Alive. The song was written by Tom Walker, Chelcee Grimes and Steve McCutcheon who also produced the song. In 2019 during concert Jingle Bell Ball he performed a Christmassy rendition of Basshunter's "Now You're Gone".

== Music video ==
A music video to accompany the release of "Now You're Gone" was first released onto YouTube on 31 May 2019.

== Track listing ==
Digital download
No.	Title	Length
1.	"Now You're Gone" (Radio Edit) (feat. Zara Larsson)	2:53

Digital download – Kiasmos Remix
No.	Title	Length
1.	"Now You're Gone" (feat. Zara Larsson) (Kiasmos Remix)	5:00

Digital download – Jerome Price Remix
No.	Title	Length
1.	"Now You're Gone" (feat. Zara Larsson) (Jerome Price Remix)	3:29

Digital download – Acoustic version
No.	Title	Length
1.	"Now You're Gone" (feat. Zara Larsson) (Acoustic)	3:01

== Charts ==
Chart (2019)	Peak position
Ireland (IRMA)	77
New Zealand Hot Singles (RMNZ)	24
Scotland Singles (OCC)	37
Sweden (Sverigetopplistan)	84
UK Singles (OCC)	79

== Certifications ==
Region	Certification	Certified units/sales
United Kingdom (BPI)	Silver	200,000^{‡}
^{‡} Sales+streaming figures based on certification alone.
