= Better Half of Me =

2019 Song by Tom Walker

Single by Tom Walker

from the album What a Time to Be Alive (Deluxe Edition)
- Released: 4 October 2019
- Length: 3:15
- Label: Relentless Records
- Songwriter(s): Tom Walker; Joel Laslett Pott; Cam Blackwood
- Producer(s): Cam Blackwood; Mark Ralph

Tom Walker singles chronology
"Now You're Gone" (2019)	"Better Half of Me" (2019)	"Heartbeats" (2019)

"Better Half of Me" is a song by Scottish singer-songwriter Tom Walker. The song was released as a digital download on 4 October 2019 as the fourth single from the deluxe edition of his debut studio album, What a Time to Be Alive. The song was written by Tom Walker, Joel Laslett Pott and Cam Blackwood.

== Music video ==
A music video to accompany the release of "Better Half of Me" was first released onto YouTube on 11 October 2019.

== Track listing ==
Digital download – R3HAB Remix
No.	Title	Length
1.	"Better Half of Me" (R3HAB Remix)	2:46

Digital download – Acoustic version
No.	Title	Length
1.	"Better Half of Me" (Acoustic)	3:48

Digital download – Todd Terry Remix
No.	Title	Length
1.	"Better Half of Me" (Todd Terry Remix)	3:35

Digital download – MJ Cole Remix
No.	Title	Length
1.	"Better Half of Me" (MJ Cole Remix)	5:16

Digital download – Ferreck Dawn Remix
No.	Title	Length
1.	"Better Half of Me" (Ferreck Dawn Remix)	2:37

Digital download – Etherwood Remix
No.	Title	Length
1.	"Better Half of Me" (Etherwood Remix)	3:12

== Charts ==
Chart (2019)	Peak position
Belgium (Ultratip Bubbling Under Wallonia)	31
Ireland (IRMA)	55
Scotland (OCC)	6
Slovakia (Singles Digitál Top 100)	34
UK Singles (OCC)	30

== Certifications ==
Region	Certification	Certified units/sales
United Kingdom (BPI)	Platinum	600,000^{‡}
^{‡} Sales+streaming figures based on certification alone.
