= What a Time to Be Alive (Tom Walker album) =

Studio album by Tom Walker
- Released: 1 March 2019
- Length: 48:26
- Label: Relentless
- Producer: Mike Spencer; Jim Abbiss; Steve Mac; Hight; Jonathan Quarmby; Rudimental; Jesse Shatkin; JAE5; Mark Ralph

Tom Walker chronology
| Blessings (2017) | What a Time to Be Alive (2019) | I Am (2024) |

Singles from What a Time to Be Alive
- 1. "Just You and I (acoustic)" Released: 7 April 2017; 2. "Blessings" Released: 19 May 2017; 3. "Leave a Light On" Released: 13 October 2017; 4. "My Way" Released: 22 June 2018; 5. "Angels" Released: 7 September 2018; 6. "Not Giving In" Released: 17 May 2019; 7. "Now You're Gone" Released: 31 May 2019; 8. "Better Half of Me" Released: 4 October 2019; 9. "Heartbeats" Released: 2 November 2019

What a Time to Be Alive is the debut studio album by British singer-songwriter Tom Walker, released on 1 March 2019 through Relentless Records. It was preceded by the single "Leave a Light On", which reached the top 10 of the UK Singles Chart, as well as "My Way" and "Angels". It also includes "Walk Alone", released as a single from Rudimental's 2019 album Toast to Our Differences, and the original acoustic version of "Just You and I", which was re-released in a different version for single release in early 2019, also reaching the top 10 in the UK.

The album debuted atop the UK Albums Chart with first week sales of 37,000.

== Background ==
Walker originally tweeted in July 2018 that the album would be released on 19 October 2018. On its delay, he said to Idolator that he felt like he had "been sat on this album for a little while". He also spoke about the title, and how it is either interpreted as being "depressing" or "hopeful", but that he named it "because we've come so far, the human race, but also, I think we keep making the same mistakes over and over again, and not learning sometimes. It's a thought provoking title, that's why I like it."

== Critical reception ==
Professional ratings
Review scores
| Source | Rating |
|---|---|
| Clash | 7/10 |
| The Guardian | 2/5 stars |
| The Times | 2/5 stars |

Writing for The Guardian, Alexis Petridis scored the album two out of five stars and called Walker "algorithmically designed for our times", comparing his sound to that of Ed Sheeran, in that the two share a "predilection for a percussive style of guitar playing, vaguely hip-hop beats and rap-influenced vocal cadences". Petridis also characterised the songwriting as either being "bullish assertions of Walker's own talent in the face of apathy and adversity ('I'll be dead before they change me, my guitar's the only one that ever paid me') and empathetic I'm-your-mate vignettes involving booze, drugs and lean times." Reviewing the album for Clash, Malvika Padin described it as "an assured, controlled debut album" featuring "a mix of slow instrumentals and soaring vocals, that make an impact track after track", summarising it as a "perfect representation of him – cheerful, genuine, heartfelt and talented". In a two-star review, Will Hodgkinson of The Times also compared Walker to Sheeran and Rag'n'Bone Man, saying that "the public appetite for earnest bearded troubadours who look as if they work in a microbrewery shows no sign of abating". Hodgkinson further noted that the album is "perfectly pleasant" but with its team of songwriters writing for mass audience appeal, "almost wilfully dull".

== Track listing ==
| No. | Title | Writer(s) | Producer(s) | Length |
|---|---|---|---|---|
| 1. | "Angels" | Thomas Walker; James Eliot; Emma Davidson-Dillon | Mike Spencer | 3:29 |
| 2. | "Leave a Light On" | Walker; Steve McCutcheon | Steve Mac | 3:05 |
| 3. | "Not Giving In" | Walker | Spencer | 3:48 |
| 4. | "How Can You Sleep at Night?" | Walker; Samuel Romans; Steve Robson | Spencer | 3:36 |
| 5. | "Now You’re Gone" (featuring Zara Larsson) | Walker; Chelcee Grimes; McCutcheon | Mac | 3:32 |
| 6. | "My Way" | Walker; Fiona Bevan; Timothy Deal | Spencer; Hight^{[b]} | 3:56 |
| 7. | "Blessings" | Walker; Jez Ashurst; Mark Vallance | Jim Abbiss | 3:17 |
| 8. | "Cry Out" | Walker; Paul Barry | Abbiss | 3:25 |
| 9. | "Dominoes" | Walker; Thomas AD Fuller | Abbiss | 4:03 |
| 10. | "Fade Away" | Walker | Abbiss | 4:43 |
| 11. | "Just You and I" (acoustic) | Walker | Jonathan Quarmby | 3:18 |
| 12. | "The Show" | Walker; Paul O'Duffy | Abbiss | 4:49 |
| 13. | "Walk Alone" (Rudimental featuring Tom Walker) | Amir Izadkhah; Piers Aggett; Kesi Dryden; Leon "DJ Locksmith" Rolle; Cass Lowe; Ilsey Juber; Dacoury Natche; Walker; Jesse Shatkin; Jonathan Mensah | Rudimental; Spencer; Shatkin; JAE5^{[a]} | 3:25 |
| Total length: | | | | 48:26 |

Tidal and Spotify bonus track
| No. | Title | Writer(s) | Producer(s) | Length |
|---|---|---|---|---|
| 14. | "Just You and I" | Walker | Mark Ralph | 2:55 |

=== Deluxe Edition ===
The deluxe edition of the album was released on 8 November 2019 and features the song "Better Half of Me", released on 4 October 2019.

| No. | Title | Writer(s) | Producer(s) | Length |
|---|---|---|---|---|
| 1. | "Just You and I" | Thomas Walker | Mark Ralph | 2:54 |
| 2. | "Leave a Light On" | Walker; Steve McCutcheon | Steve Mac | 3:05 |
| 3. | "Better Half of Me" | Walker; Joel Laslett Pott; Cam Blackwood | Blackwood; Ralph | 3:15 |
| 4. | "Not Giving In" | Walker | Mike Spencer | 3:48 |
| 5. | "How Can You Sleep at Night?" | Walker; Samuel Romans; Steve Robson | Spencer | 3:36 |
| 6. | "Angels" | Walker; James Eliot; Emma Davidson-Dillon | Spencer | 3:29 |
| 7. | "Now You're Gone" (featuring Zara Larsson) | Walker; Chelcee Grimes; McCutcheon | Mac | 3:32 |
| 8. | "My Way" | Walker; Fiona Bevan; Timothy Deal | Spencer; Hight^{[b]} | 3:56 |
| 9. | "Blessings" | Walker; Jez Ashurst; Mark Vallance | Jim Abbiss | 3:17 |
| 10. | "Cry Out" | Walker; Paul Barry | Abbiss | 3:25 |
| 11. | "Dominoes" | Walker; Thomas AD Fuller | Abbiss | 4:03 |
| 12. | "Fade Away" | Walker | Abbiss | 4:43 |
| 13. | "Just You and I" (acoustic) | Walker | Jonathan Quarmby | 3:18 |
| 14. | "The Show" | Walker; Paul O'Duffy | Abbiss | 4:49 |
| 15. | "Walk Alone" (Rudimental featuring Tom Walker) | Amir Izadkhah; Piers Aggett; Kesi Dryden; Leon "DJ Locksmith" Rolle; Cass Lowe; Ilsey Juber; Dacoury Natche; Walker; Jesse Shatkin; Jonathan Mensah | Rudimental; Spencer; Shatkin; JAE5^{[a]} | 3:25 |
| 16. | "Heartbeats" | Walker; Romans; Thomas Barnes; Peter Kelleher; Benjamin Kohn | TMS | 3:12 |
| 17. | "Something to Believe In" | Walker; Simon Aldred | Blackwood | 3:40 |
| 18. | "Be Myself" | Walker; Fuller | Abbiss | 4:01 |
| 19. | "All That Matters" (acoustic) | Walker; Bevan; Deal | | 3:14 |
| 20. | "Fly Away with Me" | Walker; John Fortis; Robert Harvey | Walker; Fortis^{[a]} | 3:31 |
| 21. | "Leave a Light On" (Sony Bravia version) | Walker; McCutcheon | | 3:38 |

== Charts ==
=== Weekly charts ===
| Chart (2019) | Peak position |
|---|---|
| Australian Albums (ARIA) | 18 |
| Austrian Albums (Ö3 Austria) | 34 |
| Belgian Albums (Ultratop Flanders) | 31 |
| Belgian Albums (Ultratop Wallonia) | 86 |
| Dutch Albums (Album Top 100) | 18 |
| French Albums (SNEP) | 35 |
| German Albums (Offizielle Top 100) | 19 |
| Irish Albums (IRMA) | 14 |
| Italian Albums (FIMI) | 35 |
| Lithuanian Albums (AGATA) | 60 |
| New Zealand Albums (RMNZ) | 32 |
| Portuguese Albums (AFP) | 43 |
| Scottish Albums (OCC) | 1 |
| Spanish Albums (PROMUSICAE) | 23 |
| Swedish Albums (Sverigetopplistan) | 51 |
| Swiss Albums (Schweizer Hitparade) | 8 |
| UK Albums (OCC) | 1 |

=== Year-end charts ===
| Chart (2019) | Position |
|---|---|
| UK Albums (OCC) | 8 |
| Chart (2020) | Position |
| UK Albums (OCC) | 38 |

== Certifications ==
Certifications for What a Time to Be Alive
| Region | Certification | Certified units/sales |
|---|---|---|
| Denmark (IFPI Danmark) | Gold | 10,000^{‡} |
| Italy (FIMI) | Gold | 25,000^{‡} |
| Norway (IFPI Norway) | Gold | 10,000^{‡} |
| Poland (ZPAV) | Gold | 10,000^{‡} |
| United Kingdom (BPI) | Platinum | 300,000^{‡} |
^{‡} Sales+streaming figures based on certification alone.
