= Wait for You (Tom Walker song) =

Single by Tom Walker

from the album I Am
- Released: 13 June 2020
- Length: 2:52
- Label: Relentless Records
- Songwriters: Tom Walker; Cam Blackwood; Joel Laslett Pott
- Producer: Cam Blackwood

Tom Walker singles chronology
"Heartbeats" (2019)	"Wait for You" (2020)	"Something Beautiful" (2021)

"Wait for You" is a song by Scottish singer-songwriter Tom Walker. The song was released as a digital download on 13 June 2020 as the lead single from his upcoming second studio album, I Am. The song was written by Tom Walker, Cam Blackwood and Joel Laslett Pott. A remix of the song featuring German singer Zoe Wees was released on 11 September 2020.

== Background ==
Walker said, "This song is about a mate of mine who went through a life-changing event as a teenager. It took a long time for him to heal… now he's one of the most outgoing, positive people you could ever meet." Walker performed the song during a 'Zoom World Tour' in six countries over 12 hours.

== Music video ==
A music video to accompany the release of "Wait for You" was first released onto YouTube on 19 June 2020.

== Track listing ==
Digital download
No.	Title	Length
1.	"Wait for You"	2:52

Digital download
No.	Title	Length
1.	"Wait for You (Steve Void Remix)"	2:47
2.	"Wait for You"	2:53

Digital download
No.	Title	Length
1.	"Wait for You (Acoustic)"	2:57

== Charts ==
Chart (2020)	Peak position
Ireland (IRMA)	90
New Zealand Hot Singles (RMNZ)	39
Scotland Singles (OCC)	11
UK Singles (OCC)	47

== Certifications ==
Region	Certification	Certified units/sales
United Kingdom (BPI)	Silver	200,000^{‡}
^{‡} Sales+streaming figures based on certification alone.
