= Sun Comes Up =

Single by Rudimental featuring James Arthur

from the album Toast to Our Differences
- Released: 30 June 2017
- Studio: Hoxton
- Genre: Dance-pop; dance
- Length: 3:52
- Label: Asylum; East West
- Songwriters: Amir Amor; Kesi Dryden; Piers Aggett; Cass Lowe; Leon "DJ Locksmith" Rolle
- Producers: Rudimental; Lowe

Rudimental singles chronology
"Common Emotion" (2016)	"Sun Comes Up" (2017)	"These Days" (2018)

James Arthur singles chronology
"Go for Broke" (2017)	"Sun Comes Up" (2017)	"Naked" (2017)

"Sun Comes Up" is a song by English drum and bass band Rudimental, featuring British singer-songwriter James Arthur, released on 30 June 2017 through Asylum Records and East West Records as the lead single from the band's third studio album Toast to Our Differences (2018). It was written and produced by Kesi Dryden, Leon Rolle, Piers Aggett, Amir Amor and Cass Lowe.

"Sun Comes Up" peaked at number 6 in the UK Singles Chart, and charted moderately in several other countries.

== Background ==
The band said in a statement that the song is about overcoming adversity. "We're so excited to announce our new single Sun Comes Up, a song we wrote about overcoming adversity. We spent a long time looking for the right singer for it, and were close to giving up until we met James Arthur, he sang it and we were blown away. We aren't afraid of taking new directions, and our new material has stepped up to another level. We've travelled the world far and wide and finally we feel like we've returned home on this album." "We wanted to work with him [James Arthur] from the first time we saw him on TV. We didn't care where he came from. We thought his voice was amazing, unique," Rudimental told London Evening Standard. Kesi Dryden of Rudimental said that the song is about "a relationship breakup and how there is a new day when the sun comes up". "But when James heard the song he said the message he got from it was there has been a lot of negative times in the past but when the sun comes up it is a new day, you have a new chance. There was a new lease of life he got from it."

== Music video ==
The music video for "Sun Comes Up" was directed by Canadian filmmaker Amos Le Blanc. Shot across the landscapes of South Africa, the video follows a dancer who overcomes self-doubt before being joined by a group of fellow dancers. Neither Rudimental nor James Arthur appear in the video. The video accumulated over 34.6 million YouTube views.

== Critical reception ==
Robin Murray of Clash magazine described the song as "fusing underground sounds with some of the freshest pop hooks in the land". "James Arthur voices new single 'Sun Goes Up', and it's summertime feel is much-needed following a few dark weeks for the capital." Philippine Daily Inquirer wrote: "'Sun Comes Up' is a touching glimpse into how they've grown, both as individuals and as a band, and the various struggles they have been through to overcome adversity to get where they are today." Katrina Rees of CelebMix wrote: "The track opens with a gentle melody before an infectious beat kicks in which complements James' vocals. The chorus is euphoric and tinged with steel drums which creates the perfect summer atmosphere. We can already imagine that this song will be electric live and we can't wait to bop along to it at future festivals."

== Track listing ==
- Digital download
1. "Sun Comes Up" (featuring James Arthur) – 3:52
- Digital download
1. "Sun Comes Up" (Steel Banglez Remix) (featuring James Arthur and MIST) – 3:51
- Digital download
1. "Sun Comes Up" (Acoustic) (featuring James Arthur) – 4:15
- Digital download
1. "Sun Comes Up" (Heyder Remix) (featuring James Arthur) – 4:10
- Digital download
1. "Sun Comes Up" (Tritonal Remix) (featuring James Arthur) – 4:13
- Digital download – Remixes, Pt. 1
1. "Sun Comes Up" (Offaiah Remix) (featuring James Arthur) – 3:13
2. "Sun Comes Up" (Ofenbach Remix) (featuring James Arthur) – 3:10
3. "Sun Comes Up" (Coldabank Remix) (featuring James Arthur) – 4:16
4. "Sun Comes Up" (Leon Lour Remix) (featuring James Arthur) – 3:56
- Digital download – Remixes, Pt. 2
1. "Sun Comes Up" (Steel Banglez Remix) (featuring James Arthur and MIST) – 3:51
2. "Sun Comes Up" (Murdock Remix) (featuring James Arthur) – 3:51
3. "Sun Comes Up" (Distinkt Remix) (featuring James Arthur) – 3:29
4. "Sun Comes Up" (House of Mizchif Remix) (featuring James Arthur) – 6:43

== Credits and personnel ==
Credits adapted from Tidal.

- Piers Aggett – composing, producing, background vocals, piano, synthesizer
- Amir Amor – composing, producing, background vocals, drum programming, guitar
- Cass Lowe – composing, producing, background vocals
- Kesi Dryden – composing, producing, background vocals, bass, strings
- Leon "Locksmith" Rolle – composing, producing, keyboard, background vocals, percussion
- Stuart Hawkes – mastering engineering
- Dave Emery – mixing
- Michael Freeman – mixing
- Spike Stent – mixing

== Charts ==
=== Weekly charts ===
Chart (2017–18)	Peak position
Australia (ARIA)	55
Austria (Ö3 Austria Top 40)	50
Belgium (Ultratip Bubbling Under Flanders)	1
Belgium (Ultratip Bubbling Under Wallonia)	27
Czech Republic Airplay (ČNS IFPI)	22
Czech Republic Singles Digital (ČNS IFPI)	90
Germany (GfK)	76
Hungary (Rádiós Top 40)	7
Hungary (Single Top 40)	33
Ireland (IRMA)	15
Netherlands (Single Tip)	21
Poland Airplay (ZPAV)	6
Romania (Airplay 100)	69
Scottish Singles Sales (Official Charts)	6
Slovakia Airplay (ČNS IFPI)	8
Slovakia Singles Digital (ČNS IFPI)	84
Slovenia (SloTop50)	18
Sweden (Sverigetopplistan)	80
Switzerland (Schweizer Hitparade)	48
UK Singles (Official Charts)	6
US Hot Dance/Electronic Songs (Billboard)	33

=== Year-end charts ===
Chart (2017)	Position
Hungary (Rádiós Top 40)	90
Latvia Airplay (LaIPA)	95
Poland (ZPAV)	25
UK Singles (Official Charts Company)	75

== Certifications ==
Region	Certification	Certified units/sales
Australia (ARIA)	2× Platinum	140,000^{‡}
Germany (BVMI)	Gold	200,000^{‡}
New Zealand (RMNZ)	Platinum	30,000^{‡}
Poland (ZPAV)	Gold	25,000^{‡}
United Kingdom (BPI)	2× Platinum	1,200,000^{‡}
^{‡} Sales+streaming figures based on certification alone.
