= Kind (album) =

Studio album by Stereophonics
- Released: 25 October 2019
- Recorded: 29 June – 9 July 2019
- Studio: Ramsbury Brewery & Distillery (Marlborough, Wiltshire)
- Length: 42:12
- Label: Stylus; Parlophone
- Producer: Kelly Jones; George Drakoulias

Stereophonics chronology
Scream Above the Sounds (2017)	Kind (2019)	Oochya! (2022)

Singles from Kind
- 1. "Fly Like an Eagle" Released: 15 August 2019; 2. "Bust This Town" Released: 18 September 2019; 3. "Don't Let the Devil Take Another Day" Released: 21 October 2019; 4. "Hungover For You" Released: 21 February 2020

Kind is the eleventh studio album by Welsh rock band Stereophonics released on 25 October 2019 on Parlophone Records, nearly two years after their previous album, Scream Above the Sounds. Recorded over an eleven-day period between 29 June and 9 July 2019 at The Ramsbury Brewery & Distillery in Marlborough, Wiltshire, the album was produced by lead singer and guitarist Kelly Jones and George Drakoulias. Kind topped the UK Albums Chart, becoming the band's first to do so since Keep the Village Alive (2015) and their seventh overall.

== Background and writing ==
At the end of the band's last world tour frontman Kelly Jones considered quitting the band because he had no inspiration to write new music after feeling burnt out on the road. He said "Our last gig of the world tour was September 2018, in Brooklyn – I was done, had written no songs, nothing new, I thought I felt like quitting." Instead of quitting, however, Jones spent some time with his family and he got some ideas for new songs. "Then by November I had a load of songs that just came through me, lyrics just filling up pages, no crossings out, complete songs formed. They became a very open and to be honest, bunch of really vulnerable songs about things I hadn’t quite worked out for myself, the songs began to inform me how I was feeling. I didn’t know, or really mind if others wanted to hear them or like them, I just needed to get them out of me."

The first single, "Fly Like an Eagle", was one of the first songs to be written for the record. Jones said "I feel it covers a lot of ground on the record and the line came, ‘Wanna fly like an eagle, and dare to be reborn’ – not in a religious sense, but it’s about changing and growth, and learning not relying on the comfort zones of your life. And as people we all morph into new and different versions of ourselves. We don’t have to stay the same."

'Hungover For You' was written in a hotel in Scotland before the band headlined TRNSMT festival in 2018.

== Release and promotion ==
=== Artwork ===
The album artwork for Kind is a drawing of a tree by Jones’ eldest child Colby. The booklet for the album also features two paintings, I Just Wanted The Goods by Steve Goddard and Moon by Misty Jones.

=== Formats ===
The record was released on five major formats, including: standard CD, deluxe CD, vinyl, cassette and digital download. The deluxe CD features a bonus disc which contains demo versions of six of the songs present on the album. Kind was issued on three different vinyl editions, standard black vinyl, pink vinyl and on picture disc.

=== Singles ===
On 15 August 2019 the band debuted the song "Fly Like an Eagle" on Radio X and released the official music video for the track. The video is an emotionally affecting coming-of-age tale, which was shot by Charlotte Regan and stars Charlie Creed-Miles. On 18 September 2019 the single "Bust This Town" was released. An official video was released for "Bust This Town" on 30 September 2019. The video was directed by Kes Glozier and follows two lovers on the run, who build a love nest in a derelict manor house. During November and December 2019 the third single "Don't Let the Devil Take Another Day" was often played on most radio stations like BBC Radio 2 and an official video was released on 26 November 2019. The video features a montage of footage filmed during the recording of the album. "Hungover For You" was the fourth and final single taken from the album. It was released on 21 February 2020. A new version of the song was released featuring additional string arrangements.

== Reception ==
=== Critical response ===
Professional ratings
Aggregate scores
Source	Rating
Metacritic	60/100
Review scores
Source	Rating
Clash	8/10
Classic Rock	3/5 stars
Evening Standard	4/5 stars
Hot Press	6/10
Islington Gazette	3/5 stars
Q	2/5 stars
Uncut	3.5/5 stars

At Metacritic, which assigns a weighted average rating out of 100 to reviews from mainstream critics, the album received an average score of 60 based on 4 reviews, indicating "mixed or average reviews". Susan Hansen of Clash Music gave the album 8 out of 10 and said "‘Kind’ signifies some of the band’s finest work released to date."

=== Commercial performance ===
Kind topped the UK Album Chart giving Stereophonics their seventh number one album, selling just under 30,000 in its first week, including just over 3,000 copies on vinyl. In 2023, the album was certified Gold in the UK for 100,000 equivalent units.

== Track listing ==
All tracks written by Kelly Jones.

No.	Title	Length
1.	"I Just Wanted the Goods"	4:33
2.	"Fly Like an Eagle"	4:32
3.	"Make Friends with the Morning"	4:51
4.	"Stitches"	4:46
5.	"Hungover for You"	4:08
6.	"Bust This Town"	3:54
7.	"This Life Ain't Easy (But It's the One That We All Got)"	6:12
8.	"Street of Orange Light"	3:02
9.	"Don't Let the Devil Take Another Day"	3:04
10.	"Restless Mind"	3:10
Total length:		42:12

== Charts and certifications ==
=== Weekly charts ===
Chart (2019)	Peak position
Australian Digital Albums (ARIA)	26
French Albums (SNEP)	105
Hungarian Albums (MAHASZ)	11
Irish Albums (IRMA)	35
Japanese Albums (Oricon)	175
Scottish Albums (OCC)	1
Spanish Albums (PROMUSICAE)	97
Swiss Albums (Schweizer Hitparade)	54
UK Albums (OCC)	1

=== Certifications ===
Region	Certification	Certified units/sales
United Kingdom (BPI)	Gold	100,000^{‡}
^{‡} Sales+streaming figures based on certification alone.

== Release history ==
Region	Date	Version	Format	Label
United Kingdom	25 October 2019	Standard edition; deluxe edition	CD; vinyl; digital download; cassette	Parlophone Records
