= Leave a Light On (Tom Walker song) =

2017 single by Tom Walker

Single by Tom Walker

from the album What a Time to Be Alive
- Released: 13 October 2017
- Length: 3:05
- Label: Relentless
- Songwriter(s): Thomas Walker; Steve Mac
- Producer(s): Steve Mac; Cliff Masterson

Tom Walker singles chronology
"Heartland" (2017)	"Leave a Light On" (2017)	"My Way" (2018)

Music video
- "Leave a Light On" on YouTube

"Leave a Light On" is a song by British singer-songwriter Tom Walker. It was released to digital retailers on 13 October 2017. The song was co-written by Walker and Steve Mac. The song reached the top 10 in Austria, Wallonia, Germany, Italy and Switzerland, while reaching the top 40 in Australia, Flanders, France, Poland and the Netherlands. The song reached number 7 in the UK and number 34 on the Irish Singles Chart.

An acoustic version of the track, arranged and produced by Cliff Masterson was featured in the Sony Bravia TV advert.

== Background ==
In an interview with Idolator, Walker revealed that the song was about a friend of his who was struggling with addiction, and explained that he wrote it for his "family and [his] friends to let them know that [they] can talk about it".

== Charts ==
=== Weekly charts ===
Chart (2017–19)	Peak position
Australia (ARIA)	20
Austria (Ö3 Austria Top 40)	2
Belarus Airplay (Eurofest)	7
Belgium (Ultratop 50 Flanders)	2
Belgium (Ultratop 50 Wallonia)	3
Croatia (HRT)	52
Czech Republic (Rádio – Top 100)	2
Euro Digital Songs (Billboard)	2
France (SNEP)	12
Germany (GfK)	8
Hungary (Rádiós Top 40)	7
Hungary (Single Top 40)	8
Ireland (IRMA)	25
Italy (FIMI)	8
Netherlands (Dutch Top 40)	6
Netherlands (Single Top 100)	10
New Zealand (Recorded Music NZ)	40
Poland (Polish Airplay Top 100)	37
Portugal (AFP)	49
Romania (Airplay 100)	69
Russia Airplay (Tophit)	14
Scotland (OCC)	2
Slovakia (Rádio Top 100)	3
Slovakia (Singles Digitál Top 100)	54
Slovenia (SloTop50)	23
Spain (PROMUSICAE)	77
Sweden Heatseeker (Sverigetopplistan)	3
Switzerland (Schweizer Hitparade)	3
UK Singles (OCC)	7
Ukraine Airplay (TopHit)	3
US Adult Pop Airplay (Billboard)	20

=== Year-end charts ===
Chart (2018)	Position
Austria (Ö3 Austria Top 40)	27
Belgium (Ultratop Flanders)	5
Belgium (Ultratop Wallonia)	3
CIS (Tophit)	51
France (SNEP)	21
Germany (Official German Charts)	23
Hungary (Rádiós Top 40)	29
Iceland (Plötutíóindi)	78
Italy (FIMI)	44
Netherlands (Dutch Top 40)	33
Netherlands (Single Top 100)	55
Portugal (AFP)	138
Russia Airplay (Tophit)	51
Slovenia (SloTop50)	28
Switzerland (Schweizer Hitparade)	10
UK Singles (Official Charts Company)	36

Chart (2019)	Position
CIS (Tophit)	86
Hungary (Rádiós Top 40)	30
Ukraine Airplay (Tophit)	8
UK Singles (Official Charts Company)	61

== Certifications ==
Region	Certification	Certified units/sales
Australia (ARIA)	3× Platinum	210,000^{‡}
Austria (IFPI Austria)	2× Platinum	60,000^{‡}
Belgium (BRMA)	Platinum	40,000^{‡}
Canada (Music Canada)	Platinum	80,000^{‡}
Denmark (IFPI Danmark)	Gold	45,000^{‡}
France (SNEP)	Diamond	333,333^{‡}
Germany (BVMI)	3× Gold	600,000^{‡}
Italy (FIMI)	2× Platinum	100,000^{‡}
Netherlands (NVPI)	Gold	20,000^{‡}
Poland (ZPAV)	Platinum	50,000^{‡}
Spain (PROMUSICAE)	Platinum	60,000^{‡}
Switzerland (IFPI Switzerland)	3× Platinum	60,000^{‡}
United Kingdom (BPI)	4× Platinum	2,400,000^{‡}
^{‡} Sales+streaming figures based on certification alone.

== Release history ==
Region	Date	Format	Label	Ref.
Various	13 October 2017	Digital download	Relentless	
United States	22 January 2018	Hot adult contemporary radio	Epic	
United States	1 May 2018	Contemporary hit radio	Epic	
