= Tom Walker (singer) =

British singer-songwriter

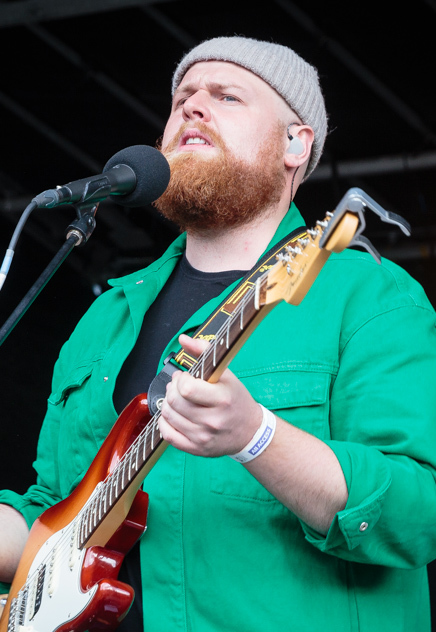
- Walker in 2018

Background information
- Born: Thomas Alexander Walker; 17 December 1991 (age 34); Kilsyth, Scotland
- Origin: Chelford, England
- Genres: Folk; rock; pop-rock
- Occupations: Musician; singer; songwriter
- Instruments: Vocals; guitar
- Years active: 2015–present
- Label: Relentless
- Website: iamtomwalker.com

Thomas Alexander Walker (born 17 December 1991) is a Scottish singer-songwriter from Kilsyth, Scotland. He rose to fame after the release of his single "Leave a Light On", which peaked at number seven on the UK Singles Chart in June 2018.

== Early life and education ==
Walker was born in Kilsyth. Despite relocating with his family to Chelford, England, when he was three, Walker claims his upbringing was still 'Glaswegian', due to his Scottish background. He speaks with a Glasgow accent when with family or in Scotland. His favourite artists while growing up included Ray Charles, Muddy Waters and Paolo Nutini. In 2014, prior to fame, Walker graduated from the London College of Creative Media.

== Career ==
=== 2017–2019: What a Time to Be Alive and collaborations ===
In 2017, Walker released "Just You and I", which was picked as Elvis Duran's Artist of the Month appearing on NBC's Today show with Kathie Lee Gifford where he performed the song. His follow-up single was "Blessings", the title track from his debut EP Blessings. On 13 June 2017, Walker released the single "Heartland", which was co-written and produced by Naughty Boy. On 22 August 2017, the single was added to the BBC Radio 1 playlist. Later in 2017, Walker was named as one of the new additions to the BBC Radio 1 Brit List. Walker has played support slots for artists such as George Ezra, Gallant and Jake Bugg. On 28 September, Walker began his US tour, in Connecticut, supporting The Script.

On 13 October 2017, Walker released his single "Leave a Light On" on Relentless Records. The single was co-written and produced by Steve Mac. The music video for "Leave a Light On" was produced by Charles Mehling, and filmed in Croatia. It impacted numerous international charts and was included in his debut studio album What a Time to Be Alive. In 2019, Walker won the Best Breakthrough Act at the 2019 Brit Awards. The song "Leave a Light On" was also nominated for "Best British Single".

=== 2020–present: I Am ===
In November 2019, Walker confirmed he had begun working on his second studio album. Following this, in early 2020, What a Time to Be Alive achieved platinum accreditation by the British Phonographic Industry for sales of over 300,000 units in the UK.

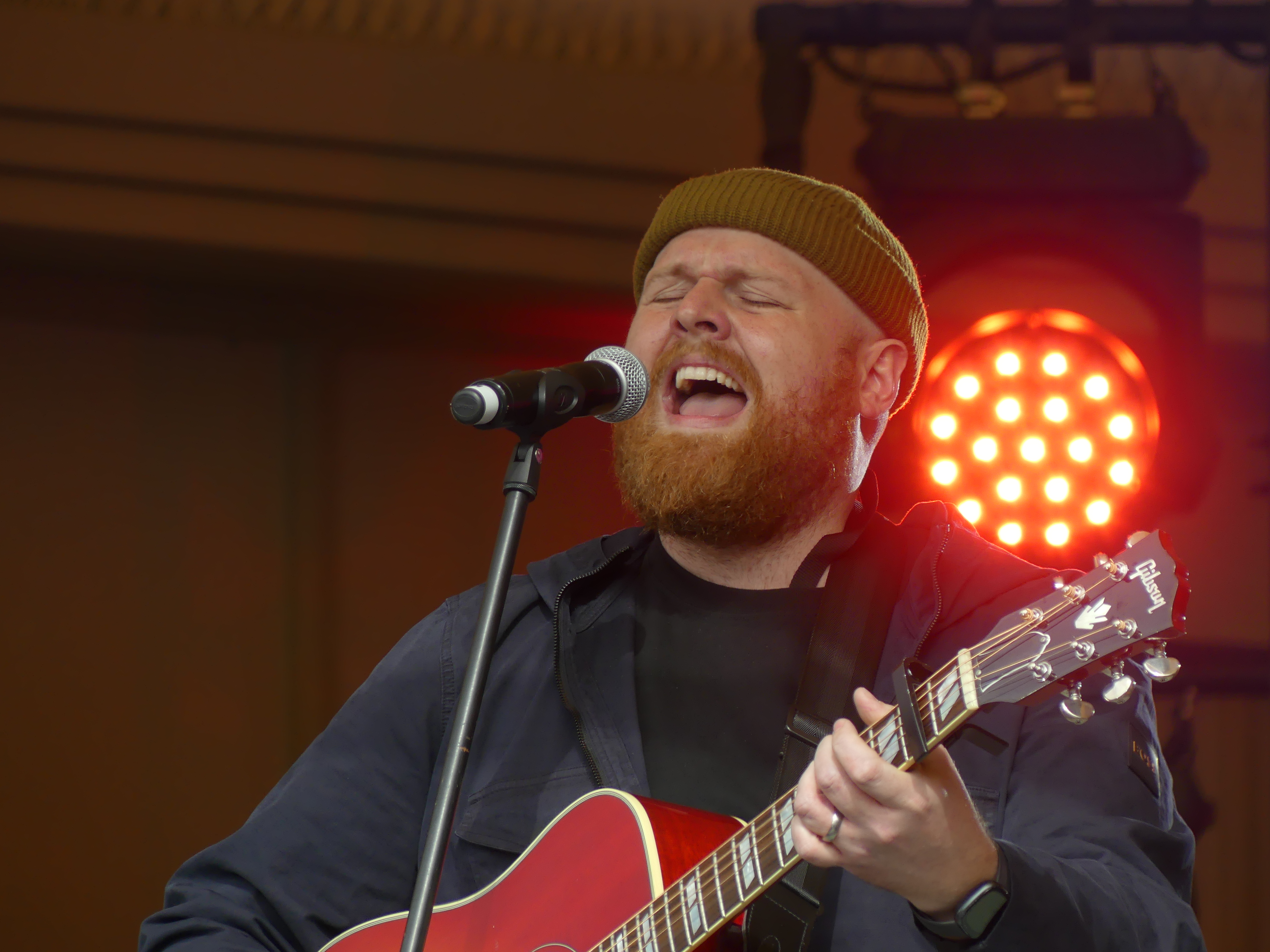
Walker performing at SWR3 New Pop Festival 2024

As part of "Royal Carols: Together at Christmas" in December 2021, Tom Walker performed "For Those Who Can't Be Here" with Catherine, Princess of Wales (at the time styled the Duchess of Cambridge) playing piano.

Walker's single "The Best Is Yet to Come" was released on 13 October 2022, and peaked at number 23 on the UK Singles Downloads Chart and the UK Singles Sales Chart. It was then followed by the single "Burn", released on 22 September 2023. On 3 November 2023, Walker officially announced his sophomore studio album, I Am. That same day, he released his single "Freaking Out". The next single, "Head Underwater" was released on 2 February 2024, and peaked at number 95 on the UK Singles Chart. He then released two more songs: "Lifeline" on 29 March 2024, and "Holy Ghost" on 19 July 2024. I Am was released on 20 September 2024 and peaked at number 4 on the UK Albums Chart.

== Discography ==
=== Studio albums ===
List of studio albums, with release date, label, selected chart positions and certifications shown
Title	Details	Peak chart positions								Certifications
Title	Details	UK	AUS	AUT	FRA	GER	IRE	NZ	SWI	Certifications
What a Time to Be Alive	Released: 1 March 2019; Label: Relentless; Format: CD, digital download, streaming	1	18	34	35	19	14	32	8	BPI: Platinum
I Am	Released: 20 September 2024; Label: Relentless; Format: CD, digital download, streaming	4	—	—	—	—	—	—	—	

=== Extended plays ===
List of EPs, with release date and label shown
Title
Blessings
Details
- Released: 19 May 2017
- Label: Relentless
- Format: Digital download, streaming
Notes

No.	Title	Length
1.	"Blessings" (EP Version)	3:17
2.	"Karma"	3:03
3.	"Rapture"	3:06
4.	"Play Dead" (The 4AM Mix)	3:54
5.	"Just You and I" (Acoustic)	3:16

=== Singles ===
==== As lead artist ====
List of singles, with year released, selected chart positions, certifications, and album name shown
Title	Year	Peak chart positions												Certifications	Album
Title	Year	UK	UK Down.	UK SS	AUS	AUT	BEL (FL)	FRA	GER	IRE	ITA	NL	SWI	Certifications	Album
"Sun Goes Down" (featuring Kojey Radical)	2016	—	—	—	—	—	—	—	—	—	—	—	—		Non-album single
"Fly Away with Me" (Note: "Fly Away with Me", "All That Matters" (acoustic release), "Better Half of Me", and "Heartbeats" only appear on the deluxe edition of What a Time to Be Alive.)	2016	—	—	—	—	—	—	—	—	—	—	—	—		What a Time to Be Alive
"Play Dead"	2016	—	—	—	—	—	—	—	—	—	—	—	—		Blessings (Note: "Just You and I" (acoustic release) and "Blessings" also feature on Tom Walker's debut studio album What a Time to Be Alive.)
"Just You and I" (acoustic release)	2017	—	—	—	—	—	—	—	—	—	—	—	—		Blessings
"Blessings"	2017	—	—	—	—	—	—	—	—	—	—	—	—		Blessings
"Rapture"	2017	—	—	—	—	—	—	—	—	—	—	—	—		Blessings
"Heartland"	2017	—	—	—	—	—	—	—	—	—	—	—	—		Non-album single
"Leave a Light On"	2017	7	1	1	20	2	2	12	8	10	8	8	3	BPI: 4× Platinum; ARIA: Platinum; BEA: Gold; BVMI: 3× Gold; FIMI: 2× Platinum; IFPI AUT: Gold; SNEP: Platinum	What a Time to Be Alive
"My Way"	2018	—	—	—	—	—	—	—	—	—	—	—	—		What a Time to Be Alive
"Angels"	2018	—	87	87	—	—	—	—	—	—	—	—	—	BPI: Silver	What a Time to Be Alive
"Just You and I" (2019 re-release) (Note: The 2019 version of "Just You and I" appears on some digital versions, as well as the deluxe version, of What a Time to Be Alive.)	2019	3	3	3	97	64	51	164	93	7	54	—	58	BPI: 3× Platinum; ARIA: Gold; BVMI: Gold	What a Time to Be Alive
"All That Matters" (acoustic release)	2019	—	—	—	—	—	—	—	—	—	—	—	—		What a Time to Be Alive
"Not Giving In"	2019	—	50	50	—	—	—	—	—	—	—	—	—		What a Time to Be Alive
"Now You're Gone" (featuring Zara Larsson)	2019	79	50	50	—	—	—	—	—	77	—	—	—	BPI: Silver	What a Time to Be Alive
"Better Half of Me"	2019	30	6	6	—	—	—	—	—	55	—	—	—	BPI: Platinum	What a Time to Be Alive
"Heartbeats"	2019	—	—	—	—	—	—	—	—	—	—	—	—		What a Time to Be Alive
"Wait for You"	2020	47	16	16	—	—	—	—	—	71	—	—	—	BPI: Silver	I Am
"Wait for You" (featuring Zoe Wees)	2020	—	—	—	—	—	—	—	—	—	—	—	—		I Am
"Something Beautiful" (featuring Masked Wolf)	2021	—	—	—	—	—	—	—	—	—	—	—	—		Non-album singles
"For Those Who Can't Be Here"	2021	—	6	6	—	—	—	—	—	—	—	—	—		Non-album singles
"Serotonin"	2022	—	75	84	—	—	—	—	—	—	—	—	—		Non-album singles
"Number 10"	2022	—	8	9	—	—	—	—	—	—	—	—	—		Non-album singles
"Sun Will Shine" (with Robin Schulz)	2022		—	—	—	—	—	—	—	—	—	—	—		Pink
"The Best Is Yet to Come"	2022	—	23	23	—	—	—	—	—	—	—	—	—		I Am
"Castles" (with Hybrid Minds)	2022	—	—	—	—	—	—	—	—	—	—	—	—		Tides
"Burn"	2023	—	44	46	—	—	—	—	—	—	—	—	—		I Am
"Freaking Out"	2023	—	—	—	—	—	—	—	—	—	—	—	—		I Am
"Head Underwater"	2024	—	95	83	—	—	—	—	—	—	—	—	—		I Am
"Lifeline"	2024	—	—	—	—	—	—	—	—	—	—	—	—		I Am
"Holy Ghost"	2024	—	—	—	—	—	—	—	—	—	—	—	—		I Am
"—" denotes a single that did not chart or was not released.

==== As featured artist ====
List of singles, with year released, selected chart positions, certifications, and album name shown
Title	Year	Peak chart positions		Certifications	Album
Title	Year	UK	IRE	Certifications	Album
"Human" (DODIE featuring Tom Walker)	2018	—	—		Human
"Walk Alone" (Rudimental featuring Tom Walker)	2018	80	92	BPI: Silver	Toast to Our Differences and What a Time to Be Alive
"Leave a Light On" (Red Hot Chilli Pipers featuring Tom Walker)	2019	7 (Note: Sales of this version were combined with the original by the Official Charts Company.)	10	BPI: 4× Platinum	Fresh Air
"Home" (Glockenbach featuring Tom Walker)	2025	—	—		Non-album single
"—" denotes a single that did not chart or was not released.

=== Guest appearances ===
List of guest appearances, with year released, artist(s), and album name shown
Title	Year	Artist(s)	Album
"Where the Heart Is"	2017	The HeavyTrackerz and Mikill Pane	Odyssey "a Musical Journey"
"Tant que rien ne m'arrête"	2018	Claudio Capéo	Tant que rien ne m'arrête
"Hola (I Say)"	2019	Marco Mengoni	Atlantico

=== Songwriting credits ===
List of songwriting credits, with year released, artist(s), co-writer(s), and album name shown
Title	Year	Artist(s)	Co-writer(s)	Album
"Faithless Love"	2019	Will Young	Dan McDougall	Lexicon
