= Shotgun (George Ezra song) =

2018 single by George Ezra

Single by George Ezra

from the album Staying at Tamara's
- Released: 18 May 2018
- Genre: Pop rock
- Length: 3:26
- Label: Columbia; Sony
- Songwriters: George Ezra; Joel Pott; Fred Gibson
- Producer: Cam Blackwood

George Ezra singles chronology
"Paradise" (2018)	"Shotgun" (2018)	"Hold My Girl" (2018)

"Shotgun" is a song by British singer-songwriter George Ezra. The song was written by Ezra, Fred Gibson and Joel Pott and produced by Cam Blackwood. It was released as a digital download on 18 May 2018, as the third single from Ezra's second studio album, Staying at Tamara's. The song reached number one on the UK Singles Chart, becoming Ezra's first number-one song in the United Kingdom and was certified septuple platinum there. In addition, it topped the ARIA Singles Chart in Australia, also becoming Ezra's first number-one there, as well as the Irish Singles Chart and New Zealand Singles Chart.

== Composition ==
"Shotgun" is originally in the key of F major, with a tempo of 116 beats per minute and a chord progression of F–B♭–Dm–C.

In 2019, it was revealed that Irish country music singer Derek Ryan will be awarded royalties (of seven and a half per cent) for the song due to its similarity to the chorus of Ryan's song Flowers In Your Hair released in 2014.

== Critical reception ==
In a review for NME, Rhian Daly described the song as "anthemic" with a "balmy sound". Tom Ewing of Freaky Trigger named it "a song about summer travel which sounds, like all [of Ezra's] songs, exactly like it was first written on a borrowed acoustic in a rented villa on the Adriatic. You play the role of a fellow guest trying to sleep."

== Music video ==
A lyric video, which has Ezra performing the song in multiple locations, was first released on YouTube on 18 May 2018 and has over 300 million views as of March 2022. The official music video was also released on YouTube on 14 June 2018 and has over 70 million views as of March 2022.

== Charts ==
=== Weekly charts ===
Chart (2018–19)	Peak position
Australia (ARIA)	1
Austria (Ö3 Austria Top 40)	4
Belgium (Ultratop 50 Flanders)	1
Belgium (Ultratop 50 Wallonia)	3
Canada Hot 100 (Billboard)	71
Canada AC (Billboard)	34
Canada Hot AC (Billboard)	35
Croatia Airplay (HRT)	3
Czech Republic Airplay (ČNS IFPI)	1
Czech Republic Singles Digital (ČNS IFPI)	22
Denmark (Tracklisten)	2
France (SNEP)	30
Germany (GfK)	12
Hungary (Editors' Choice Top 40)	16
Ireland (IRMA)	1
Israel (Media Forest)	3
Italy (FIMI)	96
Luxembourg Digital Songs (Billboard)	3
Netherlands (Dutch Top 40)	1
Netherlands (Single Top 100)	3
New Zealand (Recorded Music NZ)	1
Poland Airplay (ZPAV)	2
Scottish Singles Sales (Official Charts)	1
Slovakia Airplay (ČNS IFPI)	6
Slovakia Singles Digital (ČNS IFPI)	50
Sweden (Sverigetopplistan)	98
Switzerland (Schweizer Hitparade)	4
UK Singles (Official Charts)	1
US Adult Pop Airplay (Billboard)	15
US Dance Club Songs (Billboard)	5
US Hot Rock & Alternative Songs (Billboard)	7
US Pop Airplay (Billboard)	35

=== Year-end charts ===
Chart (2018)	Position
Australia (ARIA)	9
Austria (Ö3 Austria Top 40)	18
Belgium (Ultratop Flanders)	8
Belgium (Ultratop Wallonia)	24
Denmark (Tracklisten)	29
Germany (Official German Charts)	66
Iceland (Tónlistinn)	79
Ireland (IRMA)	1
Netherlands (Dutch Top 40)	3
Netherlands (Single Top 100)	22
New Zealand (Recorded Music NZ)	37
Poland (ZPAV)	16
Switzerland (Schweizer Hitparade)	34
UK Singles (OCC)	3
US Hot Rock Songs (Billboard)	39

Chart (2019)	Position
Australia (ARIA)	22
Belgium (Ultratop Flanders)	42
Belgium (Ultratop Wallonia)	84
Denmark (Tracklisten)	50
France (SNEP)	177
Iceland (Tónlistinn)	96
Ireland (IRMA)	24
New Zealand (Recorded Music NZ)	16
Poland (ZPAV)	94
UK Singles (OCC)	12
US Hot Rock Songs (Billboard)	13

Chart (2020)	Position
Australia (ARIA)	100
UK Singles (OCC)	52

Chart (2021)	Position
UK Singles (OCC)	94

Chart (2022)	Position
UK Singles (OCC)	82

=== Decade-end charts ===
Chart (2010–2019)	Position
Australia (ARIA)	75
UK Singles (Official Charts Company)	15

== Certifications ==
Certifications for "Shotgun"
Region	Certification	Certified units/sales
Australia (ARIA)	13× Platinum	910,000^{‡}
Austria (IFPI Austria)	2× Platinum	60,000^{‡}
Belgium (BRMA)	Platinum	40,000^{‡}
Canada (Music Canada)	2× Platinum	160,000^{‡}
Denmark (IFPI Danmark)	3× Platinum	270,000^{‡}
France (SNEP)	Diamond	333,333^{‡}
Germany (BVMI)	Platinum	400,000^{‡}
Italy (FIMI)	Platinum	50,000^{‡}
Mexico (AMPROFON)	Gold	30,000^{‡}
Netherlands (NVPI)	Platinum	80,000^{‡}
New Zealand (RMNZ)	9× Platinum	270,000^{‡}
Poland (ZPAV)	3× Platinum	60,000^{‡}
Spain (Promusicae)	Platinum	60,000^{‡}
Switzerland (IFPI Switzerland)	2× Platinum	40,000^{‡}
United Kingdom (BPI)	8× Platinum	4,800,000^{‡}
United States (RIAA)	Platinum	1,000,000^{‡}
^{‡} Sales+streaming figures based on certification alone.

== Release history ==
Region	Date	Format	Label	Ref.
United States	13 August 2018	Hot adult contemporary	Columbia	
United States	22 January 2019	Contemporary hit radio	Columbia	

== See also ==
- List of best-selling singles in Australia
