= Just You and I (Tom Walker song) =

Song by Tom Walker

Single by Tom Walker

from the album What a Time to Be Alive (Deluxe Edition)
- Released: 7 April 2017 (acoustic); 11 January 2019
- Length: 2:54
- Label: Relentless
- Songwriter(s): Tom Walker
- Producer(s): Jonathan Quarmby; Mark Ralph

Tom Walker singles chronology
"Walk Alone" (2018)	"Just You and I" (2019)	"All That Matters" (2019)

"Just You and I" is a song by British singer-songwriter Tom Walker, originally released in an acoustic version in 7 April 2017 before achieving success when re-released in a different version in January 2019. It was included as a bonus track on various digital versions of Walker's debut album What a Time to Be Alive, and later included as the first track on the album's deluxe edition. The song reached the top three of the UK Singles Chart and the top 10 of the Irish Singles Chart in 2019.

== Music video ==
The music video was directed by Ollie Wolf and was also released in January 2019. It features a couple who wake up handcuffed together, starring Aggy K. Adams and Kenny Fullwood.

== Charts ==
=== Weekly charts ===
Weekly chart performance for "Just You and I"
Chart (2019)	Peak position
Australia (ARIA)	97
Austria (Ö3 Austria Top 40)	64
Belgium (Ultratip Bubbling Under Flanders)	1
Belgium (Ultratop 50 Wallonia)	21
Czech Republic (Rádio – Top 100)	51
France (SNEP)	164
Germany (GfK)	93
Hungary (Rádiós Top 40)	38
Iceland (Tónlistinn)	7
Ireland (IRMA)	7
Italy (FIMI)	54
Lithuania (AGATA)	39
Portugal (AFP)	97
San Marino (SMRRTV Top 50)	24
Scotland (OCC)	2
Slovakia (Rádio Top 100)	23
Slovakia (Singles Digitál Top 100)	82
Slovenia (SloTop50)	18
Switzerland (Schweizer Hitparade)	58
UK Singles (OCC)	3
US Adult Pop Airplay (Billboard)	24

=== Year-end charts ===
Year-end chart performance for "Just You and I"
Chart (2019)	Position
Belgium (Ultratop Wallonia)	74
Iceland (Tónlistinn)	72
Ireland (IRMA)	32
UK Singles (Official Charts Company)	19

== Certifications ==
Certifications for "Just You and I"
Region	Certification	Certified units/sales
Australia (ARIA)	Gold	35,000^{‡}
Canada (Music Canada)	Gold	40,000^{‡}
France (SNEP)	Gold	100,000^{‡}
Germany (BVMI)	Gold	200,000^{‡}
Italy (FIMI)	Platinum	50,000^{‡}
Spain (PROMUSICAE)	Gold	30,000^{‡}
Switzerland (IFPI Switzerland)	Platinum	20,000^{‡}
United Kingdom (BPI)	3× Platinum	1,800,000^{‡}
^{‡} Sales+streaming figures based on certification alone.
