= Paradise (George Ezra song) =

Single by George Ezra

from the album Staying at Tamara's
- B-side: "Ask Your Sister" (demo)
- Released: 19 January 2018
- Recorded: 2017
- Genre: Rock
- Length: 3:42
- Label: Sony
- Songwriters: George Ezra and Shane Marriott
- Producer: Cam Blackwood

George Ezra singles chronology
"Don't Matter Now" (2017)	"Paradise" (2018)	"Shotgun" (2018)

Music video
- "Paradise" on YouTube

"Paradise" is a song by English singer-songwriter George Ezra. The song was co-written by Ezra and Shane Marriott and produced by Cam Blackwood. It was released to digital retailers on 19 January 2018, as the second single from Ezra's second studio album Staying at Tamara's (2018). A music video was released the following week, on 24 January. Ezra performed the track live for the first time, on The Graham Norton Show on 2 February 2018.

The song reached the top ten in Austria, Belgium, Ireland, and the United Kingdom. It also peaked at number one in Scotland.

== Background ==
Ezra said the song was aiming to capture "a feeling that takes over when you've fallen in love", and was dedicated to his girlfriend and the early days of their relationship. He explained that the song's lyrics were "not looking at a particular love story, but more the effect that love has on your psyche. You become a mess, but it's good. It doesn't matter what's going on around you - you're in your own little world", and described "Paradise" as the "perfect love song version" of Staying at Tamara's themes of "escaping and dreaming and taking yourself away a little bit".

== Composition ==
According to the sheet music published on Musicnotes.com by Alfred Publishing Co., Inc, the song is written in the time signature of common time, with a tempo of 140 beats per minute. "Paradise" is composed in the key of B major while George Ezra's vocal range spans from the low-note of B_{3} to B_{5}.

== Personnel ==
Credits adapted from Tidal.

- George Ezra – composition, lyrics, vocals, keyboard, bass guitar, guitar
- Cam Blackwood – production, guitar, percussion, piano, programming, synthesizer
- Joel Davies – mix engineering
- Charles Hicks – mix engineering
- Dan Grech-Marguerat – mix engineering, programming
- Dave Kutch – mastering engineer
- Liam Thorne – engineering, programming
- Florrie Arnold – background vocals, drums
- Matthew Racher – drums, percussion, programming

== Charts ==
=== Weekly charts ===
Chart (2018)	Peak position
Austria (Ö3 Austria Top 40)	2
Belgium (Ultratip Bubbling Under Flanders)	7
Belgium (Ultratip Bubbling Under Wallonia)	6
Croatia Airplay (HRT)	7
Czech Republic Airplay (ČNS IFPI)	97
Germany (GfK)	24
Hungary (Rádiós Top 40)	30
Hungary (Single Top 40)	21
Ireland (IRMA)	5
Mexico Airplay (Billboard)	35
Scottish Singles Sales (Official Charts)	1
Slovenia (SloTop50)	12
Switzerland (Schweizer Hitparade)	38
UK Singles (Official Charts)	2
US Adult Alternative Airplay (Billboard)	14
US Adult Pop Airplay (Billboard)	39

=== Year-end charts ===
Chart (2018)	Position
Austria (Ö3 Austria Top 40)	23
Germany (Official German Charts)	83
Hungary (Rádiós Top 40)	71
Iceland (Plötutíóindi)	95
Ireland (IRMA)	7
Slovenia (SloTop50)	21
UK Singles (Official Charts Company)	8

Chart (2019)	Position
UK Singles (Official Charts Company)	80

=== Decade-end charts ===
Chart (2010–2019)	Position
UK Singles (Official Charts Company)	100

== Certificates ==
Region	Certification	Certified units/sales
Australia (ARIA)	2× Platinum	140,000^{‡}
Austria (IFPI Austria)	Platinum	30,000^{‡}
Canada (Music Canada)	Gold	40,000^{‡}
Germany (BVMI)	Gold	200,000^{‡}
Italy (FIMI)	Gold	25,000^{‡}
New Zealand (RMNZ)	Platinum	30,000^{‡}
Poland (ZPAV)	Gold	10,000^{‡}
South Africa (RISA)	2× Platinum	40,000^{‡}
United Kingdom (BPI)	4× Platinum	2,400,000^{‡}
^{‡} Sales+streaming figures based on certification alone.
