= Toast to Our Differences =

Studio album by Rudimental
- Released: 25 January 2019
- Studios: Major Tom's (London); Club Ralph (London); Coalhouse
- Genres: House; dance-pop
- Length: 48:15
- Labels: Asylum; Atlantic; Major Tom's
- Producers: Julian Bunetta; Cass Lowe; Major Lazer; Picard Brothers; Mark Ralph; Rudimental; John Ryan; Jesse Shatkin; Yogi

Rudimental chronology
We the Generation (2015)	Toast to Our Differences (2019)	Ground Control (2021)

Singles from Toast to Our Differences
- 1. "Sun Comes Up" Released: 30 June 2017; 2. "These Days" Released: 19 January 2018; 3. "Let Me Live" Released: 15 June 2018; 4. "Walk Alone" Released: 26 October 2018; 5. "Scared of Love" Released: 11 January 2019

Toast to Our Differences is the third studio album by English drum and bass band Rudimental, released on 25 January 2019 through Asylum Records. The album was originally planned to be released in September 2018, but was delayed to include more tracks. (Note: Despite this delay, the track list did not change after being announced in May 2018.)

It is supported by the singles "Sun Comes Up" featuring James Arthur, "These Days" featuring Macklemore, Jess Glynne and Dan Caplen, which reached number one on the UK Singles Chart, "Let Me Live" with Major Lazer and featuring Anne-Marie and Mr Eazi, and "Walk Alone" featuring Tom Walker. The band also played several shows in the lead-up to the album's release.

== Background and recording ==
The album was called "the rich fruit of the collective's past three years of work" as well as "an emphatic celebration of difference and a coming together of cultures and genres". Speaking about the features on the album, Kesi Dryden said the band are "always looking for up-and-coming talent. We've got this great opportunity to give people a platform", and called the vocalists featured "amazing". MTV called the track listing "hefty" and named it an album to look out for in 2019.

== Track listing ==
Standard edition
No.	Title	Writer(s)	Producer(s)	Length
1.	"Toast to Our Differences" (featuring Shungudzo, Protoje, and Hak Baker)	Amir Amor; Piers Aggett; Kesi Dryden; Leon Rolle; Alexandra Shungudzo Govere; Oje Ken Ollivierre; Hak Baker	Rudimental	4:14
2.	"Let Me Live" (with Major Lazer featuring Anne-Marie and Mr Eazi)	Amor; Aggett; Dryden; Rolle; Thomas Wesley Pentz; Philip Meckseper; Anne-Marie Nicholson; Bas van Daalen; Jasper Helderman; Oluwatosin Oluwole Ajibade	Rudimental; Major Lazer	3:25
3.	"Dark Clouds" (featuring Jess Glynne and Chronixx)	Amor; Aggett; Dryden; Rolle; Jamar McNaughton; Jess Glynne	Rudimental	4:28
4.	"Walk Alone" (featuring Tom Walker)	Amor; Aggett; Dryden; Rolle; Cass Lowe; Ilsey Juber; Dacoury Natche; Tom Walker; Jesse Shatkin	Rudimental; Shatkin^{[p]}; Jae5^{[c]}; Mike Spencer^{[v]}	3:25
5.	"Thula Ungakhlai" (featuring Ladysmith Black Mambazo)	Amor; Aggett; Dryden; Rolle; Daniel Caplen; Jamie Scott; Julian Bunetta; John Ryan; Ladysmith Black Mambazo	Rudimental	0:47
6.	"These Days" (featuring Jess Glynne, Macklemore, and Dan Caplen)	Amor; Aggett; Dryden; Rolle; Caplen; Ben Haggerty (Note: Haggerty is not credited on physical releases, but is credited on digital versions of the album and is registered as a songwriter in the online repertoires of ASCAP and BMI.); Scott; Bunetta; Ryan	Rudimental; Bunetta; Ryan; Mark Ralph	3:30
7.	"Sun Comes Up" (featuring James Arthur)	Amor; Aggett; Dryden; Rolle; Lowe	Rudimental; Lowe	3:52
8.	"1by1" (featuring Raye and Maleek Berry)	Amor; Aggett; Dryden; Rolle; Rachel Keen; Maleek Shoyebi; Clément Picard; Maxime Picard	Rudimental; Picard Brothers	4:08
9.	"Last Time" (featuring Raphaella)	Amor; Aggett; Dryden; Rolle; Lowe; Raphaella Mazaheri-Asadi	Rudimental	3:59
10.	"No Pain" (featuring Maverick Sabre, Kojey Radical, and Kabaka Pyramid)	Amor; Aggett; Dryden; Rolle; Michael Stafford; Keron Salmon; Kwadwo Adu Genfi Amponsah	Rudimental	4:06
11.	"Scared of Love" (featuring Ray BLK and Stefflon Don)	Amor; Aggett; Dryden; Rolle; Lowe; Alma-Sofia Miettinen; Stephanie Victoria Allen	Rudimental	3:23
12.	"Summer Love" (with Rita Ora)	Amor; Aggett; Dryden; Rolle; Rita Sahatçiu Ora; Deleon Blake; Yogesh Narindas Tulsiani; Romè Testa	Rudimental; Yogi	4:18
13.	"They Don't Care About Us" (featuring Maverick Sabre and Yebba)	Amor; Aggett; Dryden; Rolle; Stafford	Rudimental	4:40
Total length:				48:15

Deluxe edition bonus tracks
No.	Title	Writer(s)	Producer(s)	Length
14.	"Do You Remember" (featuring Kevin Garrett)	Amor; Aggett; Dryden; Rolle; Kevin Garrett	Rudimental	3:41
15.	"Leave It for Tomorrow" (featuring Elli Ingram)	Amor; Aggett; Dryden; Rolle; Yebba Smith	Rudimental	4:26
16.	"Adrenaline" (featuring Olivia)	Amor; Aggett; Dryden; Rolle; Sigrid Solbakk Raabe	Rudimental	3:57
Total length:				60:19

Note

- ^{^[p]} signifies a primary and vocal producer.
- ^{^[c]} signifies a co-producer.
- ^{^[v]} signifies a vocal producer.

== Personnel ==
Rudimental

- Piers Aggett – piano, synthesizer (all tracks); backing vocals (tracks 1, 3–16), mixing (5)
- Amir Amor – drum programming, guitar (all tracks); backing vocals (tracks 1, 3–16), mixing (5)
- Kesi Dryden – bass guitar (all tracks), keyboards (tracks 1–6, 8–16), backing vocals (1, 3–16), mixing (5), strings (7)
- Leon Rolle – keyboards, percussion (all tracks); backing vocals (1, 3–16), mixing (5)

Additional musicians

- Mark Crown – trumpet (tracks 1, 2, 4, 6, 10)
- Taurean Antoine-Chagar – saxophone (tracks 1, 2, 10)
- Harry Brown – trombone (tracks 1, 2, 10)
- Shungudzo Kuyimba – lead vocals, backing vocals (track 1)
- Oje Ollivierre – lead vocals (track 1)
- Hak Baker – lead vocals (track 1)
- Ladysmith Black Mambazo – guest vocals (track 2)
- Major Lazer – programming (track 2)
- Anne-Marie – lead vocals (track 2)
- Mr Eazi – lead vocals (track 2)
- Jess Glynne – lead vocals (tracks 4, 6)
- Chronixx – lead vocals (track 4)
- Ava Ralph – alto saxophone (track 4), saxophone (6)
- Scott Ralph – trumpet, bass trombone (track 4); horns (6)
- Erick Serna – guitar (track 4)
- Tom Walker – lead vocals, backing vocals (track 4)
- John Ryan – backing vocals, drum programming, piano (track 6)
- Julian Bunetta – backing vocals, drum programming (track 6)
- Jamie Scott – backing vocals (track 6)
- Jess Glynne – lead vocals (track 6)
- Macklemore – lead vocals (track 6)
- Chris Aldridge – saxophone (track 6)
- Dan Caplen – vocals (track 6)
- Cass Lowe – backing vocals (track 7)
- James Arthur – lead vocals (track 7)
- Raye – lead vocals (track 8)
- Maleek Berry – lead vocals (track 8)
- Raphaella – lead vocals (track 9)
- Maverick Sabre – lead vocals (tracks 10, 13)
- Kojey Radical – lead vocals (track 10)
- Kabaka Pyramid – lead vocals (track 10)
- Stefflon Don – lead vocals (track 11)
- Ray BLK – lead vocals (track 11)
- Yogi – keyboards, programming (track 12)
- Rita Ora – lead vocals (track 12)
- Andrew Gangadeen – drums (track 13)
- Yebba – lead vocals (track 13)
- Kevin Garret – lead vocals (track 14)
- Elli Ingram – lead vocals (track 15)
- Olivia – lead vocals (track 16)

Technical

- Stuart Hawkes – mastering (tracks 1–11, 13–16)
- Dave Kutch – mastering (track 12)
- James Lewis – mixing (tracks 1, 3, 8–10, 13, 14, 16)
- Fabian Lenssen – mixing (track 2)
- Mark "Spike" Stent – mixing (tracks 4, 7, 11, 12)
- Mark Ralph – mixing, engineering (track 6)
- Geoff Swan – mixing (track 15)
- Steven Weston – engineering
- Conor Bellis – engineering assistance
- Michael Freeman – mixing assistance (tracks 4, 6, 7, 11, 12)
- Dave Emery – mixing assistance (tracks 6, 7, 11)

Visuals

- Harris Elliot – creative direction, design
- Eleanor Barreau – painting
- Ben Quinton – cover and landscape photography
- Dean Chalkley – band photography
- Bevan Agyemang – styling

== Charts ==
Chart (2019)	Peak position
Australian Albums (ARIA)	41
Belgian Albums (Ultratop Flanders)	66
Dutch Albums (Album Top 100)	68
Hungarian Albums (MAHASZ)	5
Irish Albums (IRMA)	31
Lithuanian Albums (AGATA)	50
New Zealand Albums (RMNZ)	20
Scottish Albums (Official Charts)	18
Swiss Albums (Schweizer Hitparade)	31
UK Albums (Official Charts)	5
US Top Dance Albums (Billboard)	25

== Certifications ==
Certifications for Toast to Our Differences
Region	Certification	Certified units/sales
New Zealand (RMNZ)	Platinum	15,000^{‡}
United Kingdom (BPI)	Silver	60,000^{‡}
^{‡} Sales+streaming figures based on certification alone.
