= Hold My Girl =

Single by George Ezra

from the album Staying at Tamara's
- Released: 28 September 2018
- Recorded: 2017
- Genre: Soft rock
- Length: 3:31
- Label: Columbia; Sony Music
- Songwriters: George Ezra; Joel Pott
- Producer: Cam Blackwood

George Ezra singles chronology
| "Shotgun" (2018) | "Hold My Girl" (2018) | "Pretty Shining People" (2019) |

"Hold My Girl" is a song by English singer-songwriter George Ezra. The song was written by Ezra and Joel Pott, and produced by Cam Blackwood. It was initially released as the second promotional single from Ezra's second studio album Staying at Tamara's on 9 March 2018 but later selected to be the album's fourth single and released to radio on 28 September 2018. The song spent 26 weeks on the UK Singles Chart. The song was added to Australian radio in January 2019.

== Critical reception ==
In a review for NME, Nick Reilly said, "The emotional thread gets a lot more serious during the final third, notably on the soft cut 'Hold My Girl', which sees Ezra ditching the twanging guitars for his most soul-baring song yet – one destined to become first-dance material."

== Music video ==
A lyric video to accompany the release of "Hold My Girl" was first released onto YouTube on 9 March 2018 at a total length of three minutes and thirty-five seconds and has about 8 million views as of February 2019. This was followed by a stripped back performance of the track at Abbey Road Studios being uploaded a week later on 16 March 2018. The official music video for the single was released in Autumn 2018 and has over 2 million views as of December 2018.

== Track listing ==
Digital download
| No. | Title | Length |
|---|---|---|
| 1. | "Hold My Girl" | 3:31 |

== Charts ==
=== Weekly charts ===
| Chart (2018–19) | Peak position |
|---|---|
| Australia (ARIA) | 55 |
| Austria (Ö3 Austria Top 40) | 53 |
| Belgium (Ultratop 50 Flanders) | 26 |
| Belgium (Ultratip Bubbling Under Wallonia) | 34 |
| Czech Republic Airplay (ČNS IFPI) | 66 |
| Ireland (IRMA) | 33 |
| Scottish Singles Sales (Official Charts) | 4 |
| Slovenia (SloTop50) | 32 |
| UK Singles (Official Charts) | 8 |

=== Year-end charts ===
| Chart (2019) | Position |
|---|---|
| UK Singles (Official Charts Company) | 77 |

== Certifications ==
| Region | Certification | Certified units/sales |
|---|---|---|
| Australia (ARIA) | 3× Platinum | 210,000^{‡} |
| Austria (IFPI Austria) | Platinum | 30,000^{‡} |
| Canada (Music Canada) | Gold | 40,000^{‡} |
| Denmark (IFPI Danmark) | Gold | 45,000^{‡} |
| France (SNEP) | Gold | 100,000^{‡} |
| Germany (BVMI) | Gold | 200,000^{‡} |
| Italy (FIMI) | Gold | 50,000^{‡} |
| New Zealand (RMNZ) | Platinum | 30,000^{‡} |
| Poland (ZPAV) | Gold | 10,000^{‡} |
| South Africa (RISA) | Platinum | 40,000^{‡} |
| Switzerland (IFPI Switzerland) | Gold | 10,000^{‡} |
| United Kingdom (BPI) | 3× Platinum | 1,800,000^{‡} |
^{‡} Sales+streaming figures based on certification alone.

== Release history ==
| Region | Date | Format | Label |
|---|---|---|---|
| Various | 9 March 2018 | Digital download; streaming | Columbia; Sony Music |
| United Kingdom | 28 September 2018 | Airplay | Columbia; Sony Music |
| Australia | January 2019 | Airplay | Columbia; Sony Music |
