= These Days (Rudimental song) =

Single by Rudimental featuring Jess Glynne, Macklemore, and Dan Caplen

from the album Toast to Our Differences
- Released: 19 January 2018
- Recorded: 2017
- Genre: Pop; R&B
- Length: 3:30
- Label: Asylum
- Songwriters: Amir Amor; Kesi Dryden; Piers Aggett; Leon "DJ Locksmith" Rolle; Daniel Caplen; Jamie Scott; Julian Bunetta; John Ryan; Ben Haggerty
- Producers: Rudimental; Bunetta; Ryan; Mark Ralph

Rudimental singles chronology
"Sun Comes Up" (2017)	"These Days" (2018)	"Let Me Live" (2018)

Jess Glynne singles chronology
"I Can Feel It" (2016)	"These Days" (2018)	"Mind on It" (2018)

Macklemore singles chronology
"Good Old Days" (2017)	"These Days" (2018)	"I Don't Belong in This Club" (2019)

Dan Caplen singles chronology
"Two Fingers" (2017)	"These Days" (2018)	"Trouble" (2018)

Music video
- "These Days" on YouTube

"These Days" is a song by English drum and bass band Rudimental, featuring British singers Jess Glynne and Dan Caplen as well as American rapper Macklemore. It was released on 19 January 2018 as the second single from Rudimental's third studio album, Toast to Our Differences, following their UK top 10 hit "Sun Comes Up".

After spending a record-tying seven weeks at number two, the song reached number one in the UK on 30 March 2018, becoming Rudimental's third UK number-one single, Glynne's sixth, and both Macklemore (as a solo artist) and Caplen's first. This also made Glynne the British female solo artist with the most UK chart-toppers in history. The song also reached number one in Austria, Czech Republic, Latvia, Norway and Scotland, as well as the top 10 in numerous countries including Australia, Belgium, Denmark, Germany, Ireland, Italy, Netherlands, New Zealand, Sweden, and Switzerland.

== Background ==
Dan Caplen, Jamie Scott, Julian Bunetta, and John Ryan wrote a demo for "These Days" in 2016. After it was produced by Rudimental, Caplen showed it to Macklemore in Los Angeles and he was excited to feature on it. The final vocalist to join was Jess Glynne, who added her vocals to the song after a studio session in 2017.

== Music video ==
An official music video was released to Rudimental's YouTube channel on 25 January 2018. The video was filmed in London, directed by Johnny Valencia and produced by Shabana Mansuri.

== Chart performance ==
On 26 January 2018, "These Days" entered the UK Singles Chart at number 33. Two weeks later it charted at number 2, held off the top spot by Drake's song "God's Plan". Drake kept Rudimental at bay for a total of seven weeks, giving the latter a record-equalling stint at number 2; the only other songs in UK chart history to spend that number of weeks at number 2 are All-4-One's "I Swear" (1994) and "Moves Like Jagger" (2011) by Maroon 5 featuring Christina Aguilera. On 30 March, "God's Plan" became subject to accelerated chart ratio (ACR) and "These Days" finally reached number 1.

Glynne and Cheryl previously jointly held the record for most number-one singles by a British woman, with five each, but Glynne gained the record in her own right when "These Days" reached the summit.

Rudimental, Glynne and Caplen performed the song live for the first time on The One Show on 7 February 2018.

== Track listing ==
Digital download
No.	Title	Length
1.	"These Days"	3:30

Digital download – Remixes EP
No.	Title	Length
1.	"These Days" (AJR Remix)	3:51
2.	"These Days" (R3hab Remix)	2:07
3.	"These Days" (GRiZ Remix)	3:56
4.	"These Days" (Neiked Remix)	3:22
5.	"These Days" (CamelPhat Remix)	3:06

Digital download
No.	Title	Length
1.	"These Days" (DJ Premier Remix)	3:43

Digital download
No.	Title	Length
1.	"These Days" (Rudimental VIP)	2:57

Digital download
No.	Title	Length
1.	"These Days" (Mr Jukes Remix)	4:26

Digital download
No.	Title	Length
1.	"These Days" (Live from Abbey Road Studios)	3:40

Digital download
No.	Title	Length
1.	"These Days" (R3hab Remix)	2:07

Digital download
No.	Title	Length
1.	"These Days" (Acoustic)	3:32

Digital download
No.	Title	Length
1.	"These Days" (CamelPhat Remix)	3:06

== Charts ==
=== Weekly charts ===
Chart (2018)	Peak position
Australia (ARIA)	2
Australia Dance (ARIA)	1
Austria (Ö3 Austria Top 40)	1
Belgium (Ultratop 50 Flanders)	3
Belgium (Ultratop 50 Wallonia)	4
Canada Hot 100 (Billboard)	31
Canada AC (Billboard)	16
Colombia (National-Report)	56
Croatia Airplay (HRT)	5
Czech Republic Airplay (ČNS IFPI)	1
Czech Republic Singles Digital (ČNS IFPI)	2
Denmark (Tracklisten)	3
Ecuador (National-Report)	80
Europe (Euro Digital Songs)	1
France (SNEP)	15
Germany (GfK)	3
Germany Dance (Official German Charts)	1
Greece (IFPI Greece)	14
Hungary (Rádiós Top 40)	4
Hungary (Single Top 40)	5
Hungary (Stream Top 40)	2
Iceland (Tónlistinn)	1
Ireland (IRMA)	2
Israel (Media Forest)	2
Italy (FIMI)	4
Luxembourg Digital Songs (Billboard)	3
Mexico Airplay (Billboard)	13
Netherlands (Dutch Top 40)	6
Netherlands (Single Top 100)	10
New Zealand (Recorded Music NZ)	4
Norway (VG-lista)	1
Poland (Polish Airplay Top 100)	2
Portugal (AFP)	19
Romania Airplay (Media Forest)	6
Scotland Singles (OCC)	1
Singapore (RIAS)	13
Slovakia Airplay (ČNS IFPI)	4
Slovakia Singles Digital (ČNS IFPI)	5
Slovenia (SloTop50)	1
Spain (PROMUSICAE)	28
Sweden (Sverigetopplistan)	2
Switzerland (Schweizer Hitparade)	2
UK Singles (OCC)	1
US Bubbling Under Hot 100 (Billboard)	5
US Pop Airplay (Billboard)	31

=== Year-end charts ===
Chart (2018)	Position
Australia (ARIA)	14
Austria (Ö3 Austria Top 40)	5
Belgium (Ultratop Flanders)	9
Belgium (Ultratop Wallonia)	16
Canada (Canadian Hot 100)	80
Denmark (Tracklisten)	6
France (SNEP)	42
Germany (Official German Charts)	13
Hungary (Rádiós Top 40)	14
Hungary (Single Top 40)	22
Iceland (Plötutíóindi)	4
Ireland (IRMA)	4
Italy (FIMI)	13
Netherlands (Dutch Top 40)	14
Netherlands (Single Top 100)	14
New Zealand (Recorded Music NZ)	13
Poland (ZPAV)	32
Romania (Airplay 100)	63
Slovenia (SloTop50)	6
Spain (PROMUSICAE)	66
Sweden (Sverigetopplistan)	2
Switzerland (Schweizer Hitparade)	8
UK Singles (Official Charts Company)	5

Chart (2019)	Position
Hungary (Rádiós Top 40)	83
UK Singles (Official Charts Company)	85

=== Decade-end charts ===
Chart (2010–2019)	Position
UK Singles (Official Charts Company)	66

== Certifications ==
Region	Certification	Certified units/sales
Australia (ARIA)	5× Platinum	350,000^{‡}
Austria (IFPI Austria)	Platinum	30,000^{‡}
Belgium (BRMA)	Platinum	20,000^{‡}
Canada (Music Canada)	4× Platinum	320,000^{‡}
Denmark (IFPI Danmark)	3× Platinum	270,000^{‡}
France (SNEP)	Diamond	333,333^{‡}
Germany (BVMI)	3× Gold	600,000^{‡}
Italy (FIMI)	3× Platinum	150,000^{‡}
New Zealand (RMNZ)	6× Platinum	180,000^{‡}
Poland (ZPAV)	3× Platinum	150,000^{‡}
Portugal (AFP)	Platinum	10,000^{‡}
Spain (PROMUSICAE)	2× Platinum	120,000^{‡}
United Kingdom (BPI)	5× Platinum	3,000,000^{‡}
United States (RIAA)	Platinum	1,000,000^{‡}
^{‡} Sales+streaming figures based on certification alone.
