= Dan Caplen =

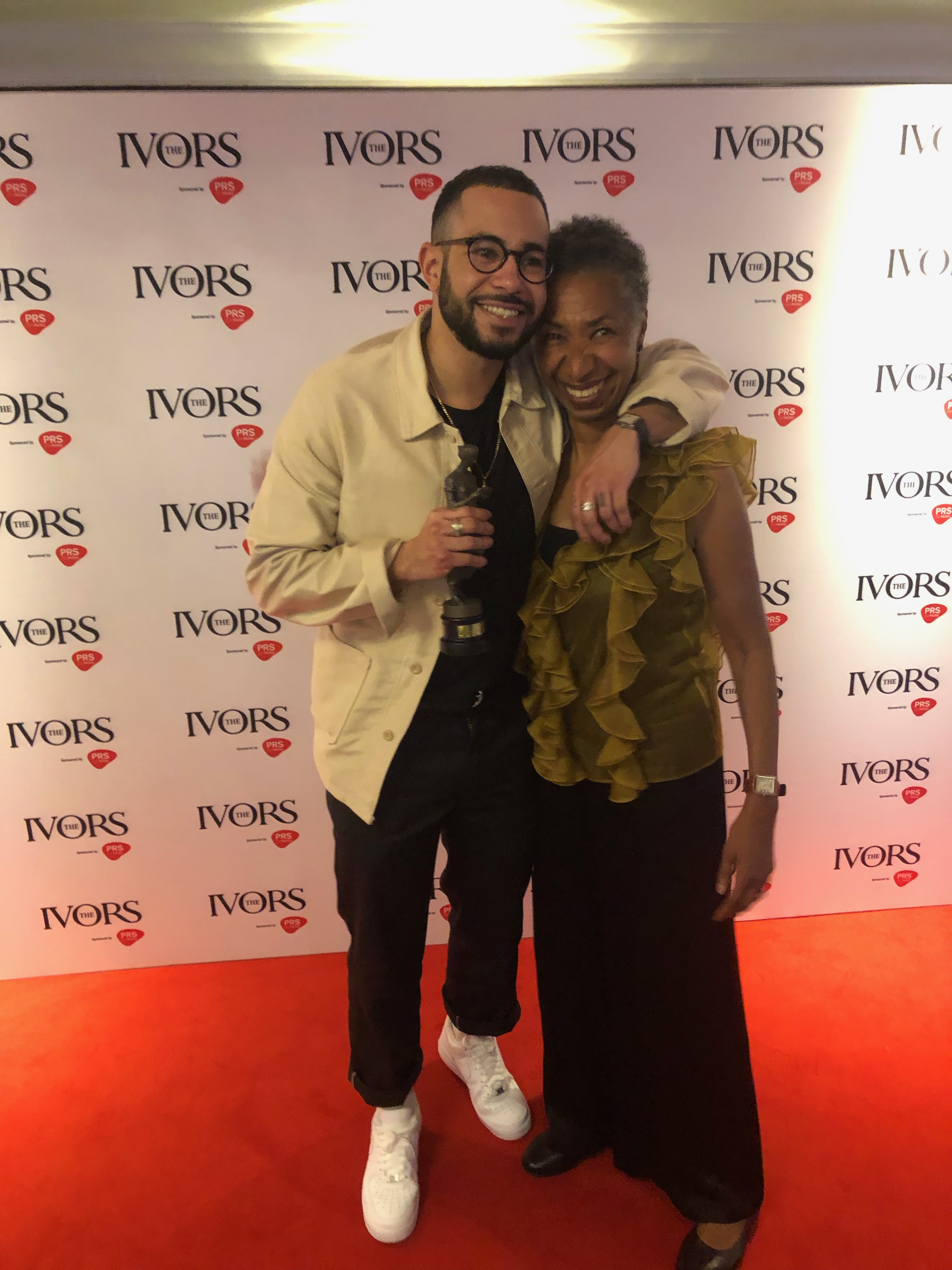
- Caplen (left) at the 2019 Ivor Novello Awards

Background information
- Born: Daniel Caplen; 27 March 1992 (age 34); London, England
- Genres: Neo soul; R&B
- Occupations: Singer; songwriter; musician
- Years active: 2015–present
- Label: Atlantic UK
- Website: dancaplen.co.uk

Daniel Caplen (born 27 March 1992), also known as his stage name D/C, is a British R&B singer, songwriter and musician based in Brixton in London. He was educated at St Edmund's School Canterbury. He is signed to Atlantic Records UK and released his first track "Longing for You" on the label on 19 February 2016.

In 2019 Caplen won an Ivor Novello Award for PRS for Music Most Performed Work for collaborating with Rudimental on their 2018 song "These Days", which also featured Jess Glynne and Macklemore.

== Early life ==
Caplen was born in London to a mother from Saint Vincent and the Grenadines and an English father, and was educated at St Edmund's School Canterbury. He started playing the piano and the cello in his early teens, before getting interested in production and remixing. Caplen briefly left Britain to study at Lewis & Clark College in Portland, Oregon, a move which helped to inspire his approach as an artist.

== Music career ==
In 2014, D/C self-released his debut EP, Epiphany, gaining the attention of Atlantic Records, who signed him to the label in the following year. He then released his first single “Longing for You” on the label in February 2016. The track is taken from his first Atlantic Records EP Badman released in 2016.

D/C supported UK electronic duo Honne on their UK tour in October 2015 as well as Anne-Marie on her UK tour in January/February 2016.

D/C also performed at The Great Escape 2016 festival in Brighton, United Kingdom.

In 2018, Caplen achieved his first UK number-one single, "These Days", alongside Rudimental, Jess Glynne and Macklemore.

== Discography ==
=== Extended plays ===
Title	Details
Epiphany (as D/C)	Released: 31 March 2014; Label: Independent; Format: Digital download
Badman	Released: 29 July 2016; Label: Atlantic Records UK; Format: Digital download
Flat Champagne	Released: 30 June 2017; Label: Atlantic Records UK; Format: Digital download

=== Singles ===
==== As lead artist ====
Year	Title	Album
2015	"I Love Gold"	Non-album single
2016	"Longing for You"	Badman
2016	"Blinded by the Lights" (The Streets cover)	Badman
2017	"Flat Champagne" (featuring Ray BLK)	Flat Champagne
2017	"My Hood" (Ray BLK cover)	Flat Champagne
2017	"Two Fingers"	Flat Champagne
2018	"Trouble" (featuring Ms Banks)	Non-album singles
2018	"4AM" (with Caitlyn Scarlett)	Non-album singles
2018	"Hosanna" (featuring Dave B)	Non-album singles
2018	"Closer to You" (featuring Sinead Harnett)	Non-album singles
2019	"Love Me the Same"	Non-album singles
2020	"Feel It Again" (with Seeb and Svidden)	Sad in Scandinavia
2021	"No Letting Go"	Non-album singles
2021	"LKFD"	Non-album singles
2021	"Lie to Myself"	Non-album singles
2021	"Loud"	Non-album singles
2025	"Lost the Feeling"	Non-album singles
2025	"Long Road" (with Jacaranda)	Non-album singles
2025	"Lose You Tonight" (with VAVO)	Non-album singles
2025	"Oceans Apart"	Non-album singles
2026	"Brotherman" (with VAVO)	Non-album singles

==== As featured artist ====
List of singles as featured artist, showing year released and album name
Title	Year	Album
"Intentions" (Macklemore featuring Dan Caplen)	2017	Gemini
"Miracle" (Macklemore featuring Dan Caplen)	2017	Gemini
"These Days" (Rudimental featuring Jess Glynne, Macklemore and Dan Caplen)	2018	Toast to Our Differences
"It's Christmas Time" (Macklemore featuring Dan Caplen)	2019	Non-album single
"Roads" (KREAM featuring Dan Caplen)	2021	Non-album single
"Move Like Me" (Jafunk featuring Dan Caplen and Triple H Horns)	2025	Non-album single
