= Misty Eye =

Studio album by Aiden Grimshaw
- Released: 20 August 2012
- Recorded: 2011–2012
- Genre: Pop, soul, alternative, electronic, drum and bass
- Length: 45:18
- Label: Sony Music
- Producer: Jarrad Rogers, Joel Pott

Singles from Misty Eye
- 1. "Is This Love" Released: 3 June 2012; 2. "Curtain Call" Released: 13 August 2012

Misty Eye is the debut studio album released by British singer-songwriter Aiden Grimshaw on 20 August 2012. The album was produced by Jarrad Rogers, Joel Pott and includes the singles "Is This Love" and "Curtain Call". It received mostly very positive reviews. It peaked at number 19 on the UK albums chart.

== Background ==
In April 2012, Grimshaw's debut single, "Is This Love", premiered. The track marked Grimshaw's first official material release since his participation in the seventh series of The X Factor, where he lost out to act Katie Waissel in the sixth week of the live finals. Speaking about his time on the show, Grimshaw stated: "I didn't really know what I wanted from it. I love music, and I knew I could sing, but I didn't think I was X Factor material. I'd been given this opportunity and I didn't want to waste it. But I had no idea what sort of music was really me. Everyone else had their own ideas, but all I knew was what I didn't want."

Since his time on The X Factor, Grimshaw has relocated from Blackpool to London, and has spent two years writing and recording demos with various writers and producers. Grimshaw has cited many tracks on the album were inspired by his time on the X Factor and weight problems as a teenager. Misty Eye has been recorded with songwriter and producer Jarrad Rogers, who has previously worked with the likes of Lana Del Rey and Tinchy Stryder. The album's track listing was confirmed via iTunes on 12 July 2012. "Undercurrent", a track written by Grimshaw and Joel Pott, did not make the final cut of the album.

== Reception ==
Professional ratings
Review scores
Source	Rating
NME	6/10 stars
Sugarscape	9/10 stars
Digital Spy	4/5 stars
The Guardian	4/5 stars
OK!	4/5 stars
Metro	2/5 stars
Express	3/5 stars
Female First	5/5 stars
Virgin Media	4/5 stars

"Misty Eye" received generally good reviews. Nick Levine from BBC gave the album a positive review, saying "the production is consistently slick...Vocally, he can switch between quivering intimacy and a belting falsetto, but his intensity never waivers." Haley Fox from Contact Music gave the album a favourable review, calling it "a record that will surprise you". Lauren Franklin from Sugarscape calls it "an incredibly strong debut album." Lewis Corner of Digital Spy gave it 4 out of 5 stars calling it a "surprisingly solid debut." Jon o'Brien from Yahoo was also positive suggesting that "Grimshaw appears to have effortlessly produced the most subversive and intriguing X-Factor release to date." OK! Magazine is similar in praise calling it "Easily one of the best albums from an X Factor graduate!"

However, Metro was less favourable claiming the album has "none of the subversion or mystery that even the most banal pop requires to succeed." Simon Gage from Express gave it 3 out of 5, saying "There's plenty of drama, quite a few beats, some gorgeous quiet moments and one would think quite a promising future." Helen Earnshaw of Female First gave it 5 out of 5, stating "He has mixed traditional pop songs with dancier elements as well as throwing in some great ballads to show that he is a very rounded and versatile artist." Matthew Horton from Virgin Media gave it 4 out of 5 stars and Michael Baggs from Gig Wise asks listeners to "Put aside your feelings on The X Factor and listen without prejudice...'Misty Eye' is the year's most unexpectedly brilliant album."

== Singles ==
On 3 June 2012, "Is This Love" was officially released, debuting at number thirty-five on the UK Singles Chart. Shortly after, the release of his second single, "Curtain Call" was announced. The single was released on 13 August 2012, making its debut at number 49. A third single from the album, "Nothing At All", was set to be released on 13 January 2013 but was abandoned.

== Track listing ==
No.	Title	Writer(s)	Producer(s)	Length
1.	"Hold On"	Aiden Grimshaw; Jarrad Rogers	Jarrad Rogers	3:27
2.	"Is This Love"	Grimshaw; Rogers; Joel Pott	Jarrad Rogers	3:22
3.	"What We Gonna Be"	Grimshaw; Rogers; Joseph Bartlett		4:28
4.	"Misty Eye"	Grimshaw; Rogers; Steve Rushton	Jarrad Rogers	3:39
5.	"Be Myself"	Grimshaw; Rogers; Jack McManus	Jarrad Rogers	3:24
6.	"This Island"	Grimshaw; Rogers	Jarrad Rogers	4:08
7.	"Breathe Me"	Sia Furler; Dan Carey	Jarrad Rogers	4:13
8.	"Poacher's Timing"	Grimshaw; Rogers; Rushton	Jarrad Rogers	4:00
9.	"Nothing at All"	Grimshaw; Rogers	Jarrad Rogers	4:09
10.	"Curtain Call"	Grimshaw; Rogers; Rushton	Jarrad Rogers	3:59

Deluxe edition bonus tracks
No.	Title	Length
11.	"Misty Eye" (acoustic version)	4:00
12.	"Is This Love" (acoustic version)	3:48
13.	"This Island" (acoustic version)	3:51
14.	"Chokehold"	3:49

Notes

- "What We Gonna Be" features uncredited vocals from Smiler.
- "Breathe Me" is a cover of the Sia song.
- "Nothing At All" features uncredited vocals from ShezAr.
- "Curtain Call" features uncredited vocals from ShezAr.

== Charts ==
Chart (2012)	Peak position
Irish Albums (IRMA)	45
UK Albums (OCC)	19

== Release history ==
Region	Date	Format	Label
United Kingdom	17 August 2012	Digital download, CD	Sony Music
