= Sheila Vogel-Coupe =

English escort, oldest prostitute in the United Kingdom (1929–2022)

- Born: Sheila R Davis; January 1929; Hampstead, Greater London, England
- Died: 25 November 2022 (aged 93); Westminster, Greater London, England
- Other names: Sheila Vogel; Grand Dame Cecilia Bird; Anthea
- Occupations: Escort, media personality
- Years active: 2010–2020
- Agent: Max Clifford
- Known for: Superannuated sex worker
- Television: My Granny the Escort
- Spouses: Jimmy Vogel (m. 1950; died 1952) Noel Coupe (m. 1999; died 2001)
- Children: 4
- Relatives: Katie Waissel (granddaughter)

Sheila R Vogel-Coupe (née Davis; January 1929 – 25 November 2022) was an English escort and media personality. She was known for being the oldest sex worker in the United Kingdom.

== Early life ==
Sheila R Davis was born in Hampstead, Greater London, England in January 1929, as the elder child to Stuart Hyam Davis and his wife, Elizabeth Beatrice (née Drage). She had a younger brother, Brian Davis.

Vogel-Coupe was born into a Jewish family. She was the granddaughter of Polish Jewish immigrants. She regularly attended the synagogue and had visited Israel.

== Career ==
Vogel-Coupe started escorting in November 2010, at the age of 81, after appearing in the hard-core pornographic film Freddie's Great British Granny Bang. The film was screened on an adult channel earlier that year. The film was repeated on the Red Hot 40+ channel on 4 December 2010. Her agent was the PR guru Max Clifford.

Vogel-Coupe made two appearances on the ITV daytime magazine programme This Morning in 2011. Her first appearance, she was interviewed by Eamonn Holmes and Ruth Langsford. Her second appearance, she was interviewed by Phillip Schofield and Holly Willoughby.

In 2014, Vogel-Coupe was entertaining up to ten clients per week at £250 an hour. She went by the name Grand Dame Cecilia Bird on the website for the escort agency Mature Courtesans. Some reports from 2014 stated that, at the age of 85, she was the oldest sex worker in the world.

Channel 4 released a documentary entitled My Granny the Escort, about Vogel-Coupe and two other elderly sex workers. The documentary was broadcast on 29 May 2014.

In 2016, it was reported that Vogel-Coupe was still active in her field at the age of 87. She worked under the pseudonym Anthea for an online website offering 'mature escorts'.

Vogel-Coupe retired in 2020, at the age of 91, amid the COVID-19 pandemic.

== Personal life ==
Vogel-Coupe married her first husband, Abraham 'Alfred' Joseph "Jimmy" Vogel, who was also Jewish, in Paddington, London, in April 1950. She gained two stepchildren, Evalyn and Ann. They had three daughters together; Susan K Tausig (née Vogel; born 1951), Carolyn E Vogel (born 1953) and Diana J Waissel (née Vogel; born 1959). She had three grandchildren and two great-grandchildren. She was widowed in 8 June 1952, after two years of marriage.

Vogel-Coupe married her second husband, Noel Parker Coupe , an aeronautical engineer, in Westminster, Greater London, in November 1999. She gained two stepchildren, Catherine and Charles. She was widowed on 24 January 2001, after fourteen months of marriage.

In 2010, it was reported by The Mirror in a statement from Vogel-Coupe's granddaughter, Natalie Davis, stating: "We were completely shocked and devastated to hear of the news that my grandmother, Sheila Vogel, has been conducting immoral activities, including prostitution and pornography. We, as a family, disassociate ourselves wholly from these activities and from any further stories that arise from them. It is a personal family matter and we would ask that during this difficult time we are allowed space to deal with it as a family. There will be no further comment." Her granddaughter, Katie Waissel, a singer-songwriter, appeared as a contestant the seventh series of the reality television music competition, The X Factor. In 2010, it was reported that Katie had cut off relations with her grandmother, accusing her grandmother of sabotaging her chance at stardom. In 2016, during her appearance on the eighteenth series of the Channel 5 reality television series, Celebrity Big Brother, Katie, in an argument with her fellow housemate, Heavy D, a television personality, said: "I know for me I'm better than you... you're an embarrassment. My grandma is more famous than you and she sucks dick!" After her grandmother's death, Katie, said: "I never had an issue with what she did. I had an issue with the fact I messaged her and said grandma, 'we will work through this as a family'. The next day she said I ruined her life as a prostitute and a porn star on national TV at the height of my vulnerability after we had spoken about it by text message.

Vogel-Coupe had an operation to have 13 inches of her intestine removed.

=== Death ===
Vogel-Coupe died in Westminster, Greater London on 25 November 2022. She was 93. Her death was announced by her daughter, Josie, in a statement to The Sun, stating: "We were so proud of her. Her passing deserves a mention because she was so unique." She had been diagnosed with dementia in 2020, amid the COVID-19 pandemic.

After Vogel-Coupe's death, her granddaughter, Katie, said: "I have been made aware of the news about my 93-year-old grandmother passing away. It is understandably a sad and sensitive time. It's a very sensitive subject to be made public unbeknownst to any of us. It is very disrespectful for someone in the family to disclose that information without anybody knowing."
