= Do You Think of Me (disambiguation) =

"Do You Think of Me?" is a 2012 song by Misha B.

Do You Think of Me may also refer to:

- "Do You Think of Me", a 1980 song by Anne Murray from the album Somebody's Waiting
- "Do You Think of Me", a 1993 song by Mariah Carey from the single release of "Dreamlover"
- "Do You Think of Me", a 2010 song by Daisy Mallory
