= Here's to Everything (Ooh La La) =

Single by Misha B
- Released: 28 April 2013
- Recorded: 2012
- Genre: R&B, drum and bass
- Length: 2:47
- Label: Relentless
- Songwriters: Misha B, Talay Riley
- Producer: Scribz Riley

Misha B singles chronology
"Do You Think of Me?" (2012)	"Here's to Everything (Ooh La La)" (2013)	"Rosa Parks Flow" (2018)

"Here's to Everything (Ooh La La)" is a song recorded by British recording artist Misha B, released as her third official single on 28 April 2013. The song was produced by Mike 'Scribz' Riley and written by Misha B and Talay Riley. The song fuses R&B with dubstep, reggae, pop, and drum and bass elements, whilst also sampling the hook from the Fugees' 1996 single "Fu-Gee-La", which itself is based on Teena Marie's 1988 hit "Ooo La La La".

The single was featured on Digital Spy's 10 tracks you need to hear playlist. So So Gay listed it on their Singles of the Week.

== Background ==
=== Composition ===
"Here's to Everything" was written by Misha B and Talay Riley and produced by Scribz Riley. According to Misha, the concept of the track is "here's to all the lows that make beautiful highs". On sampling, she revealed that Lauryn Hill is one of her musical inspirations; "I had to be cautious, she's one of my inspirations."

In an interview with on BBC 1xtra Misha B informed CJ Beatz that from the age of nine she had always wanted to produce a song about "what life meant to me", to "write a song entitled or just surrounding the concept here’s to everything"; the track is a "toast to life! It’s a feel good song celebrating everything life throws at you. I loved making it and had been waiting to write a song like this for ages. Here it is! Here’s to everything!".

Soul Culture noted that "the upbeat single" was fused R&B with reggae, pop, drum & bass elements, while Digital Spy mentioned "bouncy drums that burst on the drum 'n' bass-pop chorus". Misha B described the sound of the track as "dub step infused with a splash reggae and dance", with "a dancey reggae style which I hope will get everyone dancing. Reggae is a style close to my heart, and I love to draw on my Jamaican roots. So Drums and rhythm are a real priority to me."

=== Release ===
On 8 February 2013, Misha B announced that "Here's to Everything (Ooh La La)" would be released as the third single from her forthcoming debut album. On 15 February 2013, the song received its worldwide premier on The Hits Radio. On 19 March 2013, the artwork was released.

== Critical reception ==
The single has had mixed reviews. 4music wrote a positive review, commenting, "With lyrics like Dee Dee Dee Dee Dum and Ooh La La, the song is lighthearted, optimistic and is sure to put you in a good mood." Robert Copsey from Digital Spy gave the song 3 out of 5 stars in a mixed-to-positive review saying that "The sentiment may not be the most original, but come summer, we'll no doubt find ourselves raising a glass or two, or three..." Mark Blankenship of NewNowNext.com wrote a positive review calling it "a heart-exploding command to dance your ass off and have a good time." Sarah Dean writing for HuffPost called the track "perfect happy music" and regarded it as the closest the UK is going to get to a Nicki Minaj hit at the moment. EQ Music reviewed it as an upbeat tune and a "monster swaggering anthem set by a drum and bass beat... It’s going to make you bump, bump, your hump, hump resolutely in happiness at it’s [sic] every which way, crash and bang burst of positivity." Greg White of So So Gay labelled the single as "a booming, drum n bass, pop number that’s obviously vying to be a song of the summer." Whilst noting that the track was "slick and well-crafted", he didn't find the song catchy and labelled it generic. He also expressed that it was too similar to Rihanna's sound and that Misha B tried too hard to flavour the track with a thick island accent. He continued to say that her signature "powerful and heartfelt" vocals were not present and labelled the lyrics as "extremely common" and lacking personality. Paul Leake of ClickMusic.com stated that with each single release she delivers a "quality far above the norm for an X Factor alum." He went on to praise the track, which shows off "both her talent as a pop artist and her musical influences, occasionally colliding with mixed results". However, he thought the sampling felt "more calculated than shrewd".

== Live performances ==
Misha B performed this song live on Blue Peter. She also performed acoustic versions for several music sites including grammy.com, the Virgin Red Room (Virgin Group), Kiss 100 London, Shazam.com and Planet Notion.

== Commercial performance ==
In the United Kingdom, "Here's To Everything (Ooh La La)" debuted on the UK R&B Chart at number 7 on 5 May 2013. It also entered the UK singles chart at number 35 in the same week, but did not stay in the top 40.

== Music video ==
=== Background ===
The music video was directed by Justin Dickel and produced by Alex Bedford, and was filmed from 24 to 26 February 2013. A different version of the video was accidentally posted on Vimeo in early February but was quickly removed. On 27 February 2013, a lyric video for the single was uploaded to Misha B's official VEVO page. The official music video was uploaded to her VEVO account on 20 March 2013.

=== Synopsis ===
The accompanying music video sees Misha B dancing in water and fire, while another scene sees her sitting on a giant sphere. 500 paint powder bombs were used to create the music video, whilst 60 protective face masks were supplied for her, the dancers and crew. The video features five specially trained gymnastic dancers and required 12 hours of rehearsals in ankle-deep water.

=== Reception ===
So So Gay felt that the video tried too hard "to over-sexualize Misha", but complimented the use of wind, rain, hair-flipping, and pyrotechnics. SoulCulture.com called it a fitting energetic visual packed with dancers, water and fire and clever effects. Promo News praised the director Justin Dickel's "high concept, visually stunning video" that "explores the fire and water themes in the lyric to produce some blinding visual effects that complement the uptemp message of the song".

== Track listing ==
- Digital remixes
1. "Here's to Everything (Ooh La La)" (Radio Edit) – 2:47
2. "Here's to Everything (Ooh La La)" (Bimbo Jones Remix) – 3:54
3. "Here's to Everything (Ooh La La)" (Sweater Beats Remix) – 4:02
4. "Here's to Everything (Ooh La La)" (Motez (producer) Remix) – 3:48
5. "Here's to Everything (Ooh La La)" (Sharoque Remix) – 4:08

== Chart performance ==
=== Weekly charts ===
Chart (2013)	Peak position
Scottish Singles Sales (Official Charts)	36
Slovakia Airplay (ČNS IFPI)	57
UK Singles (Official Charts)	35
UK Hip Hop/R&B (Official Charts)	7

== Release history ==
Country	Date	Format	Label	Ref
United Kingdom	28 April 2013	Digital download	Relentless Records	
United Kingdom	15 February 2013	Radio impact	Relentless Records	
