= Curtain Call (Aiden Grimshaw song) =

Single by Aiden Grimshaw featuring ShezAr

from the album Misty Eye
- Released: 13 August 2012
- Recorded: 2012
- Genre: Pop, soul, alternative
- Length: 4:00
- Label: RCA Records
- Songwriter(s): Aiden Grimshaw, Jarrad Rogers, Steve Rushton

Aiden Grimshaw singles chronology
"Is This Love" (2012)	"Curtain Call" (2012)	"Satisfy Me" (2013)

"Curtain Call" is a single by English singer-songwriter Aiden Grimshaw. The song was written by Grimshaw, Jarrad Rogers and Steve Rushton. It was released on 13 August 2012 via RCA Records. It was released as the second single from Grimshaw's debut album Misty Eye. The song features vocals from Labrinth's sister ShezAr.

== Music video ==
A music video to accompany the release of "Curtain Call" was first released onto YouTube on 11 July 2012 at a total length of three minutes and fifty-nine seconds.

== Critical reception ==
Robert Copsey of Digital Spy gave the song a positive review, stating:

'Curtain Call' opens with similar intensity levels to his previous track, laying his heart on the line over a backdrop of cooing strings as he asks his gal to "lose control with me tonight" with alcohol-infused numbness. Fortunately, his acuteness is countered by an epic, lighter-waving chorus that soars majestically with the aid of Labrinth's sister Sherelle. The result, like a generous dose of morphine, will draw a smile every time..

== Track listing ==
Digital download
No.	Title	Length
1.	"Curtain Call"	4:00
2.	"Curtain Call" (Kat Krazy Remix)	4:11
3.	"Curtain Call" (RackNRuin Remix)	4:23
4.	"Curtain Call" (II Figures Remix)	5:17

== Chart performance ==
Chart (2012)	Peak position
UK Singles (Official Charts Company)	49

== Release history ==
Region	Date	Format	Label
United Kingdom	13 August 2012	Digital download	RCA Records
