= Aiden Grimshaw =

British singer

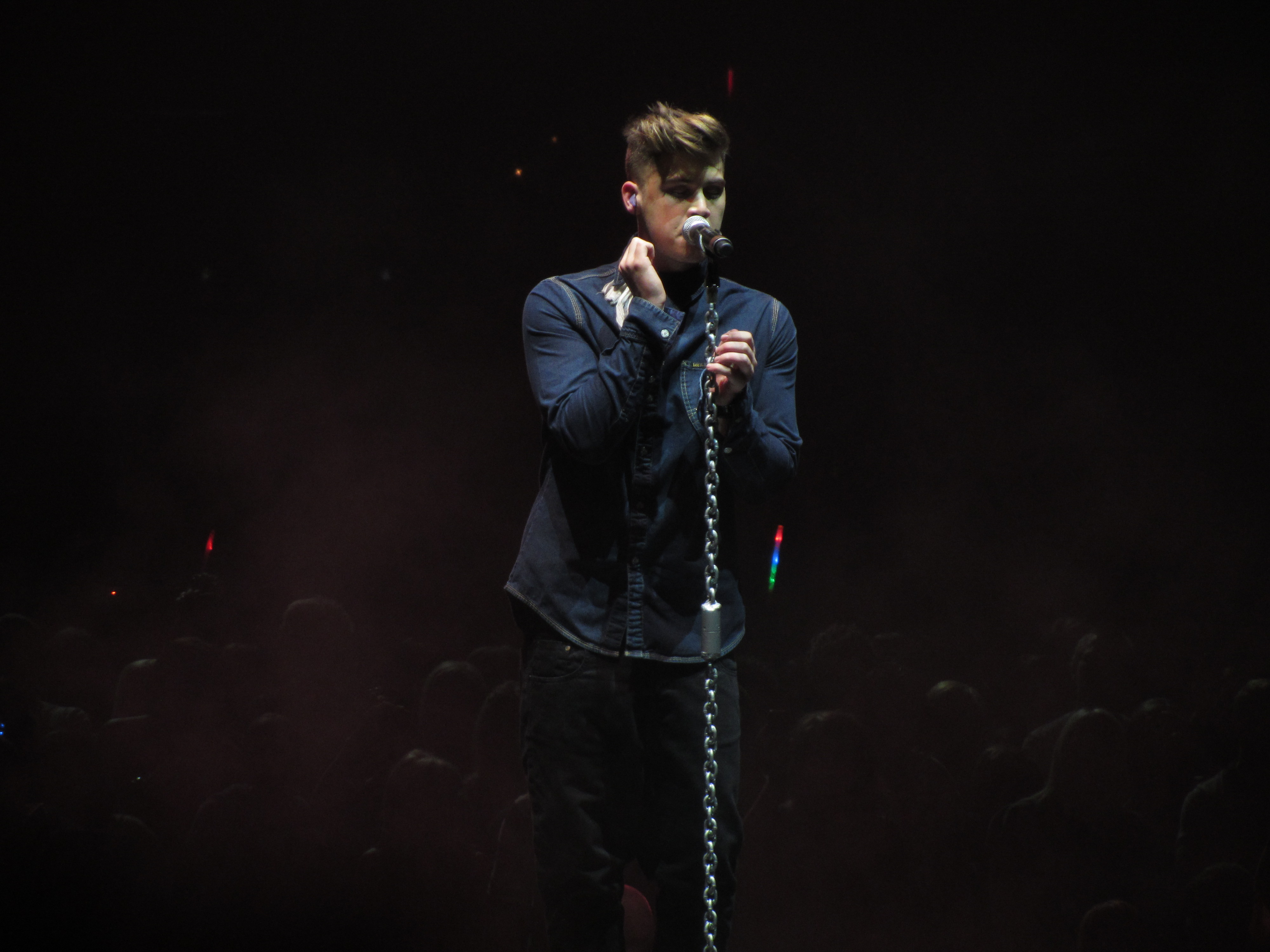

Background information
- Born: Aiden Samuel Grimshaw; 4 December 1991 (age 34); Blackpool, Lancashire, England
- Genre: Pop/Indie
- Occupations: Musician, songwriter, actor
- Instrument: Vocals
- Years active: 2010–present
- Labels: RCA, Sony, Syco (2010–12)

Aiden Samuel Grimshaw (born 4 December 1991) is an English singer, songwriter and actor who was formerly known by the stage name Butterjack. He successfully made it to the live shows in the seventh series of The X Factor in 2010 and was the eighth contestant eliminated. After his elimination, Grimshaw was signed by RCA Records.

On 3 June 2012, he released his debut single "Is This Love", which debuted at number 35 on the UK singles chart. His debut album Misty Eye was released on 20 August 2012 and reached number 19 on the UK Albums Chart.

== Biography ==
=== Early life ===
Grimshaw was born in Blackpool, Lancashire, England and studied at the Michael Hall Theatre School in North Shore, Blackpool. He played Tom Holmes in an episode of CBBC show Half Moon Investigations.

=== 2010: The X Factor ===
He auditioned with "Gold Digger", prompting Simon Cowell to say, "Now that's what I call a pop star!". He then auditioned with "This Year's Love" during Bootcamp, and "Cannonball" at Judge's Houses. Dannii Minogue selected Grimshaw as one of her three contestants to continue in the competition for the live shows. For the first live show he sang "Mad World", which the judges praised. In the second live show he sang "Jealous Guy". In the third live show, his performance of "Diamonds Are Forever" was praised by the judges. In live show 4 he sang a slower rendition of Michael Jackson's "Thriller". Grimshaw sang "Nothing Compares 2 U" in week 5, and in week 6, Grimshaw sang "Rocket Man". Grimshaw ended up in the final showdown that week, along with Katie Waissel. Cowell and Cheryl Cole voted to save Waissel, Minogue and Louis Walsh voted to save Grimshaw and the result went to deadlock. Grimshaw received the fewest public votes and he was eliminated. His exit is considered one of the most shocking in the history of the show and weekly results show he had been far from the bottom two in all previous weeks, always in the top 6.

Also during Grimshaw's tenure on The X Factor, he and his fellow series seventh contestants released a cover of David Bowie's "'Heroes'" in aid of Help for Heroes. The song, said to have been recorded in the week beginning 18 October 2010, was released as a charity single in aid of Help for Heroes, a charity which supports injured servicemen and women. The music video for the charity single was filmed on 2 November at Three Mills Studios. All sixteen contestants performed the song on 20 November's results show. The single entered both the Irish Singles Chart on 25 November 2010 and the UK singles chart on 28 November 2010 at number 1.

Despite previous years only including the top 8, the X Factor Live Tour 2011 was extended to add Aiden to the set.

=== 2011–13: Misty Eye and Aiden ===
In April 2012, "Is This Love", his debut single premiered on the Request Show on BBC Radio 1 by Matt Edmondson, who was at the time covering for Jameela Jamil. The track marked Grimshaw's first material since his participation in the 2010 series of The X Factor, where he lost out to act Katie Waissel in the sixth week of the live finals. Speaking of his time on the ITV1 series, Grimshaw stated: "I didn't really know what I wanted from it. I love music, and I knew I could sing, but I didn't think I was X Factor material. I'd been given this opportunity and I didn't want to waste it. But I had no idea what sort of music was really me. Everyone else had their own ideas, but all I knew was what I didn't want." Since his time on the show, Grimshaw has relocated from Blackpool to London, and has spent two years writing and recording demos with various writers and producers. The album has been recorded with songwriter/producer Jarrad Rogers, who has previously worked with the likes of Lana Del Rey and Tinchy Stryder.

On 3 June 2012, he released "Is This Love", which debuted at number 35 on the UK singles chart. His debut album Misty Eye was released on 20 August, debuting and peaking at number 19 on the UK Album Chart.

In early 2013, Grimshaw stated he was currently in the studio recording the follow-up to Misty Eye. On 10 August 2013, he tweeted "I think its nearly time for Round two!!! Music coming soon!! Contenders are you ready, #TheWayWeAre". Two days later he released a free download track entitled "The Way We Are". On 28 October, his Twitter account was wiped and a new one created, dropping his surname and revealing new artwork for his forthcoming EP. He also premiered a new song called "Satisfy Me". On 7 November, another track called "The Cleaner" appeared online. On 18 November, the track "Fire & Ice" was unveiled. "Better Man" was unveiled on 24 November 2013. The Aiden extended play featuring all four tracks was released for free download on 26 November 2013.

=== 2015–16: Return to Music and Second EP ===
After a year long absence from Music following the Aiden EP, Grimshaw uploaded an image to his Twitter page with the caption 'New Music', On 30 July 2015, he unveiled a new track called Virtually Married under his original name of Aiden Grimshaw. The track was written by Grimshaw, Dan Dare, Paul Harris & MEMEB, the latter was also producer of the track, Virtually Married was met with positive reviews from fans and many of them believe that this is Grimshaws 'come back' track. Several weeks later, Grimshaw posted another image to his Twitter with the caption "#GivingItUp", prompting speculation that it would be his next single. On 1 September, he uploaded the new song entitled Giving It Up, which he again collaborated with producer MEMEB on. Later that month, he unveiled the third song from his 4-song EP, called Animal, It was also announced that he was writing and collaborating with former One Direction singer Zayn Malik on his upcoming solo album.

=== 2017–present: Butterjack and new record deal ===
On 14 November 2018, he announced that he has been releasing music under the alias 'Butterjack' for the last year.

On 5 April 2023, it was announced via social media that he had signed a new deal with Dutch label Revanche Records. Under his Aiden Grimshaw name, he released the single "I Couldn't Love You Anymore", on 31 May 2024.

On 7 February 2026, he released the single "Better Place". Grimshaw followed this with the single "You & I" on 10 April 2026.

== Discography ==
=== Studio albums ===
Album Title	Album details	Peak chart positions	
Album Title	Album details	UK	IRE
Misty Eye	Released: 20 August 2012; Label: Syco, Sony, RCA; Format: CD, Digital download	19	45

=== Extended plays ===
Title	Album details
Aiden	Release date: 26 November 2013; Format: Free digital download

=== Singles ===
Title	Year	Peak chart positions			Album
Title	Year	UK	IRE	SCO	Album
"Is This Love"	2012	35	87	39	Misty Eye
"Curtain Call"	2012	49	—	—	Misty Eye
"Virtually Married	2015	—	—	—	Non-album singles
"Pretender"	2023	—	—	—	Non-album singles
"Better Off"	2023	—	—	—	Non-album singles
"I Couldn't Love You Anymore"	2024	—	—	—	Non-album singles
"Better Place"	2026	—	—	—	Non-album singles
"You & I"	2026	—	—	—	Non-album singles
"Talk"	2026	—	—	—	Non-album singles
"—" denotes release that did not chart or was not released in that territory.

=== As featured artist ===
Title	Year	Peak chart positions			Album
Title	Year	UK	IRE	SCO	Album
"Heroes" (as part of The X Factor finalists)	2010	1	1	1	Non-album singles
"A Better Man" (Glenn Morrison featuring Aiden Grimshaw)	2019	—	—	—	Non-album singles
"—" denotes release that did not chart or was not released in that territory.

== Filmography ==
=== Television ===
Year	Title	Role	Notes
2009	Half Moon Investigations	Tom Holmes	
2010	The X Factor	Contestant	Seventh series, came ninth in the competition.
2012	Unzipped	Guest	Named Weirdo of the Week.
2012	Never Mind the Buzzcocks	Guest	Won on Noel's team with 9 points
