= The X Factor (British TV series) =

British television series (2004–2018)

- Genre: Reality competition
- Created by: Simon Cowell
- Showrunner: Simon Cowell
- Directed by: Phil Heyes
- Creative directors: Brian Friedman; Brian Burke; Elizabeth Honan; Jerry Reeve; Mark Swanhart; Ashley Evans; Antony Ginandjar
- Presented by: Kate Thornton; Dermot O'Leary; Caroline Flack; Olly Murs
- Judges: Louis Walsh; Sharon Osbourne; Simon Cowell; Dannii Minogue; Cheryl; Gary Barlow; Tulisa; Kelly Rowland; Nicole Scherzinger; Mel B; Nick Grimshaw; Rita Ora; Robbie Williams; Ayda Field; Louis Tomlinson
- Voices of: Peter Dickson; Redd Pepper
- Country of origin: United Kingdom
- Original language: English
- No. of series: 15
- No. of episodes: 445

Production
- Executive producers: Simon Cowell; Richard Holloway; Beth Hart; Mark Sidaway; Cheryl; Caroline Davies; Lee McNicholas; Iona Mackenzie
- Running time: 60–150 minutes
- Production companies: Thames Television (2004–2005); Talkback Thames (2006–2011); Thames (2012–2018); Syco Entertainment (Note: Credited as SYCOtv from 2004 to 2012)

Original release
- Network: ITV
- Release: 4 September 2004 – 2 December 2018

Related
- Franchise; The Xtra Factor; Xtra Bites

The X Factor is a British reality television music competition – that spawned the global X Factor franchise – created by Simon Cowell. Premiering on 4 September 2004, it was produced by Fremantle's British entertainment company, Thames (Talkback Thames until 2011), and Cowell's production company Syco Entertainment for ITV, as well as simulcast on Virgin Media One in Ireland. The programme ran for around 445 episodes across 15 series, each one primarily broadcast late in the year, until its final episode in December 2018. The majority of episodes were presented by Dermot O'Leary, with some exceptions: the first three series were hosted by Kate Thornton, while Caroline Flack and Olly Murs hosted the show for the twelfth series.

Each year of the competition saw contestants of all ages and backgrounds auditioning for a place, in hopes of proving that they had singing talent. Auditionees attempted to do so before a panel of judges, each selected for their background in the music industry – these have included Cowell, Louis Walsh, Sharon Osbourne, Dannii Minogue, Cheryl, Gary Barlow, Tulisa, Kelly Rowland, Nicole Scherzinger, Mel B, Rita Ora, and Robbie Williams. Those acts who survived the auditions entered a bootcamp stage in which the judges each took charge of a category of contestants to mentor, determining who may move on to the live stages of the contest, with a public vote in the live rounds eliminating these contestants one by one. The winner of the live show received a recording contract with record label Syco Music and a cash payment, though the majority was allocated to marketing and recording costs.

At the same time of its premiere, The X Factor was accompanied by spin-off behind-the-scenes show called The Xtra Factor on ITV2, which focused on the recent episode's performances; this was replaced in 2016 with an online spin-off show, Xtra Bites, on ITV Hub. The programme itself proved popular on British television, attracting high viewing figures at its peak – over 14 million on average in the seventh series – leading to the formation of an international franchise. In addition, many of its acts, including JLS, Olly Murs, One Direction, Little Mix, and Ella Henderson, went on to release singles that entered number-one in the UK charts.

From 2011, viewing figures began to decline, and Cowell opted to rest the programme in 2019, assigning two spin-offs as mini-series that year – The X Factor: Celebrity and The X Factor: The Band. On 28 July 2021, ITV announced that there were no plans to air another series of the programme, effectively meaning it was cancelled.

== History ==
Simon Cowell, creator of The X Factor and the second longest-serving judge in the programme's history

The programme's format was devised by Sony Music executive Simon Cowell in 2004. The concept for The X Factor stemmed from his involvement as a judge on Pop Idol, another music talent competition that ITV aired from 2001 to 2003. While the programme had been massively successful in its own right, Cowell disliked the lack of control that he and the judges had on the contestant's progress – several individuals, including fellow judge Pete Waterman, agreed with him that Michelle McManus who won the second series of Pop Idol had been unworthy to earn victory compared to others who had participated.

Cowell eventually made plans to devise a new televised competition, in which he would own the television rights and thus maintain control on decisions held on the new programme. In 2004, ITV secured the rights to broadcast The X Factor after Cowell approached them with his concept, despite a legal challenge by Simon Fuller, the creator of Pop Idol, over perceived similarities between the two shows.

== Format ==
=== Auditions ===
Each year's competition begins with auditions round, which consists of three stages held several months prior to the series premiere, and within venues around the United Kingdom; in some series, auditions were also allowed within the Republic of Ireland. Participants are required to provide a performance across each stage, focused on singing a piece from another artist to gauge their musical talent. The first round consists of auditionees performing before production staff – either by application and appointment, or at "open" auditions that anyone can attend. Those wishing to apply could do so via postal or online applications, with The X Factor having no upper-age limit and no restriction on groups participating. If an auditionee passes this stage, they then move on to the second stage in which they perform before a senior production member. Both of these stages are not filmed, but shots of the crowds waiting to audition are spliced into audition episodes during final editing; the televised version can sometimes misrepresent the process in this fashion by implying that huge crowds all perform before the judges.

Participants that make it to the third stage of auditions then conduct their performance and potential singing talent before the judges for that year's competition. To proceed into the next round of the contest, each participant must secure a majority vote from the judges, otherwise they are eliminated at this point; the judges themselves will usually comment on what they heard first, before they cast their vote. For the majority of series (Series 1–5, 10–11, and 13–14), the third stage auditions were conducted in a closed room in which performance were done without a backing track, while for other series, they were conducted before a live audience (similar to Britain's Got Talent), with performances either done a cappella or over a backing track. Filming takes place during this stage, with the final edits for audition episodes focusing on the best, the worst and the most bizarre.

=== Bootcamp and judges' houses ===
In the second round, participants who reach this stage are sent to a "bootcamp" to refine their performances, while they are organised into categories based on the conditions of their application. The first category consists of men and women solo contestants aged under 24 – both genders were conjoined in early series until split into individual gender in the fourth series – with the minimum age allowed being 16 (except for the fourth to sixth series where it was lowered to 14). The second category consists of men and women solo acts aged 25 and older (with the exception of a few series where the minimum age was raised to 26, 27, 28 and 29). The third and final category consists of group contestants, which include two or more contestants within each group. During this time, the producers decide on which judge for that year's competition is assigned to mentoring one of the category of participants. After the judges receive their assigned category, they then oversee two stages of performances from participants in each category, in which they must whittle down the number of participants to around six per category (eight for the seventh and eighth series). The process varies across the programme's history – in most cases, their performances during this stage determines whether they move on to the next round or not; in some series, audition tapes are reviewed before the round with the judges making their choices before this stage of the competition.

Once the judges each have their selected participants for their category to mentor, these participants then move on to the "judges' houses" stage of the competition, which is held in private residences for each judge; according to Louis Walsh, these homes tend to not belong to the judges, but rented out for this purpose. In this stage, the participants each conduct a performance to their category's judge, who must decide which of their category's participants will proceed into the live rounds.

Both the bootcamp and the judges' homes stages of the contest are pre-recorded, though in some cases, either between the first and second stages of Bootcamp or prior to judges' houses, judges may look at certain rejected individual contestants who they feel have potential but may be better suited in a group, and in an attempt to give them a lifeline, then send these contestants into a room to form a number of different groups, each depending on size, height, fashion and chemistry. Lineup changes may also sometimes occur depending on what the judges feel the group is missing or which members they think work well with others. In the tenth series, the bootcamp stage was changed to a new format called "Six-Chair Challenge" in which participants had to secure a majority vote to sit in one of six empty chairs for their category, to move into the next stage; if all six seats were filled, the judge of that category must replace one of these participants with another they wish to see through. This new format, despite some tweaks, was not well received by viewers after its introduction.

=== Elimination stages and Final ===
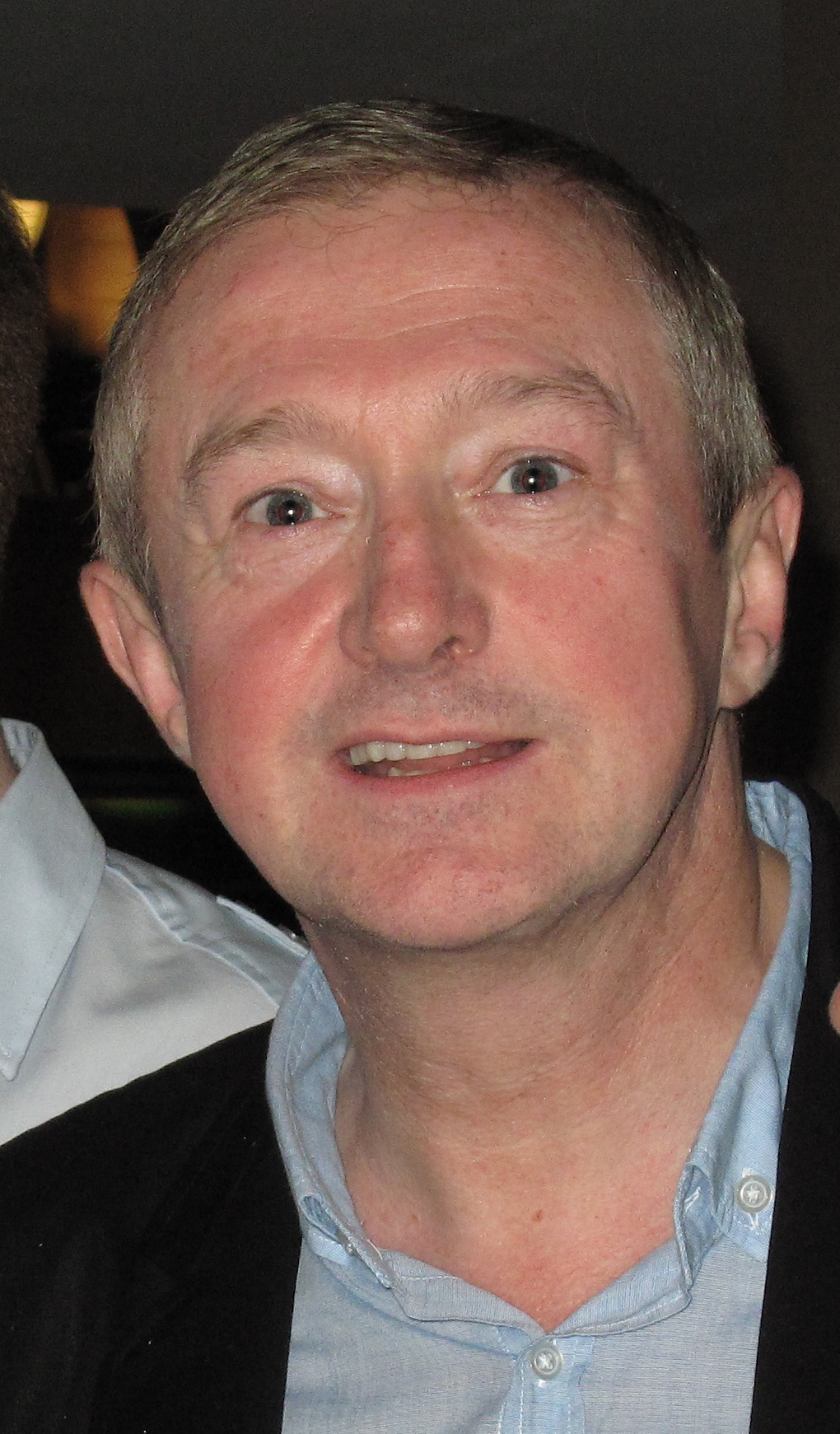
Louis Walsh, longest-serving judge on The X Factor in all but two series.

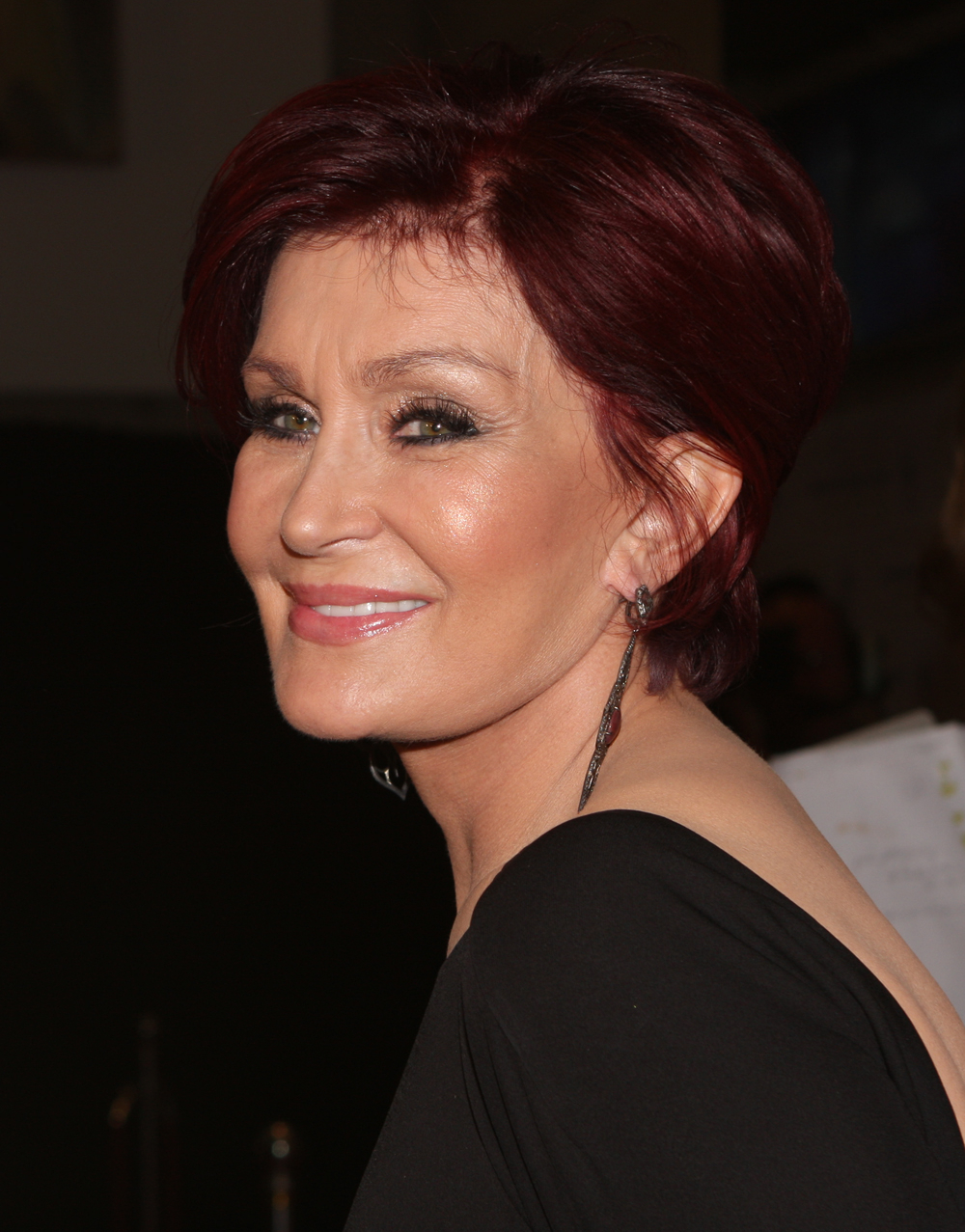
Sharon Osbourne, a judge for the first four series, and then again in 2013, and 2016–17

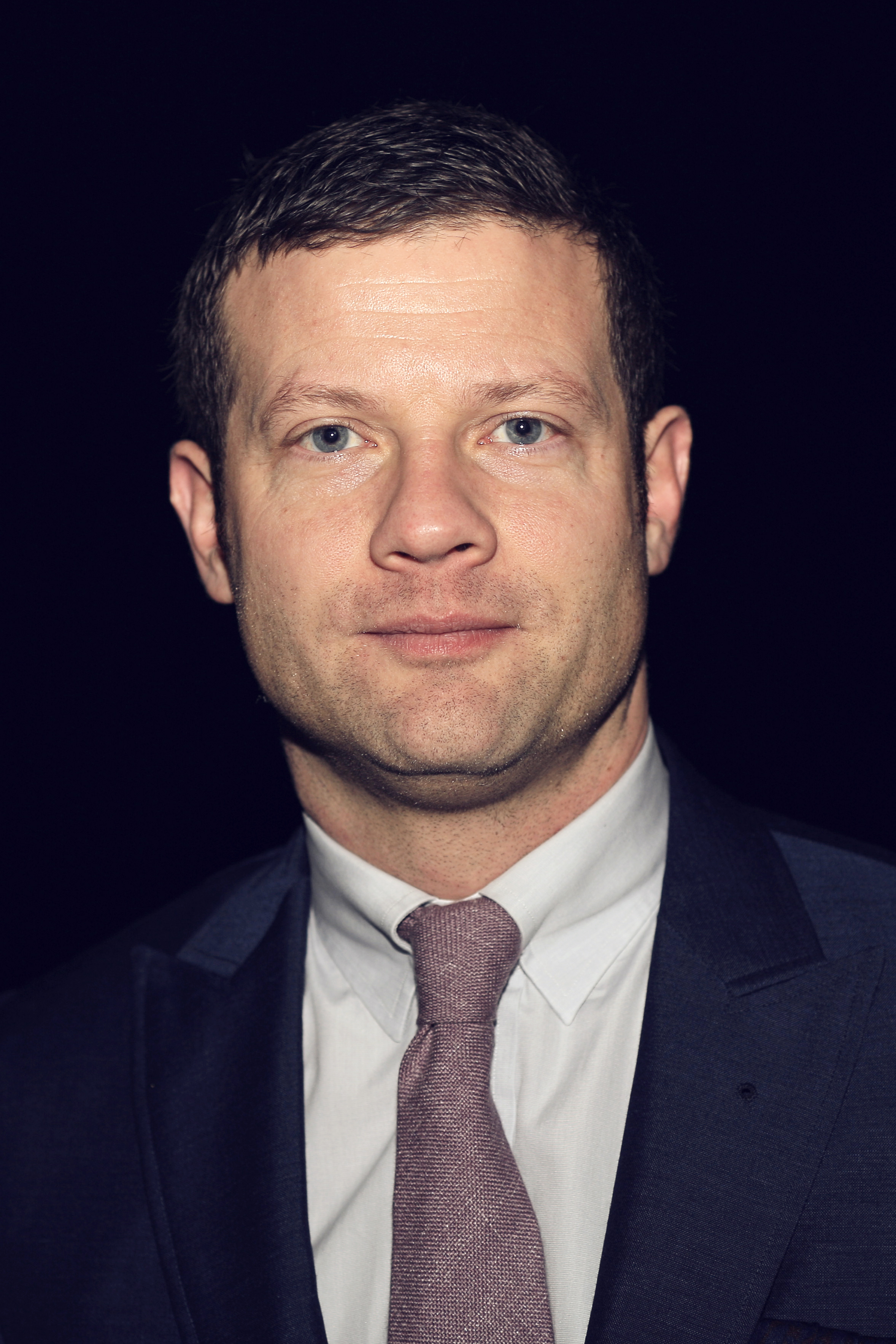
Dermot O'Leary served the longest as the programme's host from 2007, with a one-year break in 2015

Contestants who make it through both the second and third stages eventually enter the live rounds of the competition. By this stage they compete against each other over a series of elimination heats, with those that make it through competition to win in a live final, with these filmed in two parts in a fixed studio venue (except for the final after the eighth series): a performance episode featuring all active participants; and a results episode, which includes a live or pre-recorded performances by celebrity performers. During this time, they move into shared accommodation while involved in the live episodes, sharing this with production staff; filming "behind-the-scenes" within the accommodation is frequently down and used in live episodes for The Xtra Factor. In some series, some additional participants are sometimes selected from the rejects to contestants as wildcards in these stages, alongside those who progressed to the live episodes.

In these stages, each participant not only performs on live television, but also before the judges and a live studio audience. Their routine is often designed to fully judge their singing talent, appearance, personality and stage presence that may not have been noticeable during auditions, with their routine focusing a performance to a specific song – originally a pop or contemporary hit from the charts in early series, before being later assigned based on the musical theme for the episode. Performance may sometimes be accompanied by backing dancers and musicians, and, in some cases, participants may also provide their own music and/or dance routines. At the end of each performance, the judges provide feedback on each performance, with their discussions often regularly adding entertainment value to each live episode. However, success is determined by the public vote in each episode. The system involves the same phone number, with exception for the last two digits which, beginning at "01", is assigned to each participant by order of appearance. The phone number is displayed twice for viewers – once after a participant's performance is over, and a second time after all performances are completed and phone lines opened. Voting is conducted over a set time period, and closed before the results are announced of each stage of the live shows is shown, with the public vote results not detailing the actual number of votes or the ranked order (first to last) the public placed each act in).

In the elimination stages, the two contestants to be the lowest ranked in the public vote are revealed, and thus face off against each other in a "final showdown". This consists of conducting a new performance primarily for the judges – while earlier series focused on reprisal of their earlier songs, producers changed this after the fourth series to allow them to pick new songs to perform to. After their performances are completed, the judges vote on which act to eliminate. When the fourth series saw the introduction of a fourth judge, the result was given the chance to be tied. In the event of a tie, the result goes to deadlock, where the earlier public vote determines the elimination of the contestabts in the final showdown which means, of the two contestants in the final showdown, the act who received the lowest number of votes in the public vote is eliminated. Sometimes in certain years, starting with the third series, due to an increased number of contestants in the live shows or reduced weeks, a double elimination is featured where the three contestants who were the lowest ranked in the public vote are revealed, with the act who received the lowest votes is immediately eliminated with the other two contestants in the bottom two perform in the final showdown for the judges' votes. After only five (series 2, 4–6), or four (series, 1, 3, 7–9), or three (series 10–13, 15) contestants remain, no final showdown is involved – the act who has the lowest vote in the public vote is automatically eliminated. In the final, the public vote decides the winner, who receives at the end of the competition a £1 million recording contract with Syco Music, in association with Sony Music, which, by the beginning of the fifth series, included a £150,000 cash advance with the balance covering the costs of recording and marketing. Other highly placed contestants may also be offered recording deals, but this is not guaranteed.

== Judges and presenters ==
Presenters	Kate Thornton: 2004–2006; Dermot O'Leary: 2007–2014, 2016–2018; Caroline Flack: 2015; Olly Murs: 2015
Main Judges	Simon Cowell: 2004–2010, 2014–2018; Sharon Osbourne: 2004–2007, 2013, 2016–2017; Louis Walsh: 2004–2014, 2016–2017; Dannii Minogue: 2007–2010; Cheryl: 2008–2010, 2014–2015; Gary Barlow: 2011–2013; Tulisa: 2011–2012 (Note: Tulisa returned as a guest judge for a single live episode in 2014. She covered for Mel B, who was unable to attend due to illness.); Kelly Rowland: 2011; Nicole Scherzinger: 2012–2013, 2016–2017 (Note: Scherzinger was a guest judge in the 2010 series.); Mel B: 2014 (Note: Mel B was a guest judge in the 2012 series. She returned as a guest for a single audition episode in 2016 that Scherzinger could not attend due to scheduling conflicts.); Nick Grimshaw: 2015; Rita Ora: 2015; Ayda Field: 2018; Robbie Williams: 2018; Louis Tomlinson: 2018
Guest Judges	Paula Abdul: 2006; Brian Friedman: 2007 (Note: Friedman was originally recruited to be a permanent judge to replace Walsh, but was denoted as a guest judge when he was reassigned as a creative director on the programme and Walsh agreed to return for the fourth series.); Geri Halliwell: 2010, 2012 (Note: Stood in for Dannii Minogue during her maternity leave.); Natalie Imbruglia: 2010; Katy Perry: 2010; Pixie Lott: 2010; Nicole Scherzinger: 2010; Alexandra Burke: 2011 (Note: Only as a stand-in for Rowland in live episodes of this series that she was unable to attend for medical reasons.); Leona Lewis: 2012 (Note: Guest judge for the auditions.); Rita Ora: 2012; Mel B: 2012, 2016; Anastacia: 2012; Tulisa: 2014; Alesha Dixon: 2017 (Note: Dixon served as a guest judge on three separate occasions during this series as a stand-in for another judge: for Scherzinger, who could not attend an audition episode due to other commitments; for Osbourne, who could not attend an audition episode due a long-standing back injury; and for Cowell, who could not attend a live episode.); Nile Rodgers: 2018 (Note: Rogers served as guest judge for three live episodes, as a substitute for Williams, who had other arrangements during each episodes scheduled airdate.); Björn Ulvaeus: 2018 (Note: Ulvaeus joined the judging panel during the contestants second performance on the semi final, where the theme was ABBA songs.)

=== Judges ===
Judges	Series														
Judges	1	2	3	4	5	6	7	8	9	10	11	12	13	14	15
Simon Cowell															
Sharon Osbourne															
Louis Walsh															
Dannii Minogue															
Cheryl															
Gary Barlow															
Kelly Rowland															
Tulisa											★				
Nicole Scherzinger							★								
Mel B									★				★		
Nick Grimshaw															
Rita Ora									★						
Ayda Field															
Louis Tomlinson															
Robbie Williams															

=== Judging history ===
For the first three series after the programme began in 2004, the judging panel consisted of music executive and TV producer Simon Cowell, and music managers Sharon Osbourne and Louis Walsh, while it was presented by Kate Thornton. In March 2007, Thornton was dropped from the programme, with Dermot O'Leary offered a two-year contract, worth £1 million, to take over as host, which eventually led to him ending his involvement in the Big Brother franchise later that year to concentrate on his new role. In June that same year, the judging panel was expanded to include a fourth judge, and saw changes in the lineup: Brian Friedman took over from Walsh when he chose to leave the programme, while Australian singer Dannii Minogue joined the panel. However, Friedman dropped out of the panel during auditions for the fourth series, being reassigned as a creative director for the programme, while Walsh agreed to return as a result of this situation. Osbourne left the programme before the fifth series in 2008, with ITV replacing her with Cheryl. During the seventh series, Minogue went on maternity leave, leaving the production staff to fill her place on the panel with a series of guest judges during auditions – these included Geri Halliwell, Natalie Imbruglia, Katy Perry, Pixie Lott and Nicole Scherzinger.

In May 2011, Cowell and Cheryl announced their decision to leave the programme before the eighth series, in order to concentrate on the American edition of the programme. That same month, Minogue also left the programme, citing that her schedule for the live episodes of Australia's Got Talent that year would conflict with her involvement with The X Factor. Several celebrities in the music industry were approached to replace all three, before the producers opted for their replacements to be Gary Barlow, Tulisa, and Kelly Rowland. During the eighth series, Rowland was unable to attend live episodes for medical reasons, leading to previous X Factor winner Alexandra Burke standing in for her. After the series concluded, Rowland opted to drop out of the programme due to other commitments, leading to a series of guest judges being used during the ninth series, before Nicole Scherzinger was chosen as her replacement. In May 2013, Tulisa announced she was leaving The X Factor, with Osbourne revealed to be returning, but later clarifying it was for the tenth series only, with Barlow announcing during its live episodes that he would also be leaving The X Factor after the series' conclusion.

In February 2014, Cowell announced his return as a judge for the eleventh series, as he worked to reinvent the programme. The panel saw him bring back Cheryl as Osbourne's replacement, while replacing Scherzinger with Spice Girls member Mel B. In March 2015, O'Leary announced that he was quitting the show in order to pursue other projects, and was replaced a month later by both Olly Murs and Caroline Flack as co-presenters, the latter having served as a backstage presenter since 2013. Walsh left the programme in May 2015, after revealing that he had spent enough time on The X Factor. With Mel B not signing up for another series, both judges were replaced by Nick Grimshaw and Rita Ora.

In February 2016, Murs quit the programme to focus on his music career, with Flack departing the programme around the same time. The following month, O'Leary rejoined the programme as presenter. Alongside the change in presenters, the judging panel was also changed again – after Grimshaw left in February 2016, Cheryl in April, and Ora in May, Cowell was rejoined by Walsh, Osbourne and Scherzinger, for the next two years, though the latter two cast doubts on this arrangement. Cowell was joined on the judging panel by Robbie Williams, Ayda Field and Louis Tomlinson for the fifteenth and final series in 2018.

== Series overview ==
Series	No. of episodes	Originally aired		Winner^{1}	Runner-up^{1}	Average UK viewers (millions)^{2}	Winning Mentor
Series	No. of episodes	First episode	Last episode	Winner^{1}	Runner-up^{1}	Average UK viewers (millions)^{2}	Winning Mentor
1	24	4 September 2004	11 December 2004	Steve Brookstein; Over 25s	G4; Groups	7.40	Simon Cowell
2	30	20 August 2005	17 December 2005	Shayne Ward; 16–24s	Andy Abraham; Over 25s	8.73	Louis Walsh
3	30	19 August 2006	16 December 2006	Leona Lewis; 16–24s	Ray Quinn; 16–24s	8.27	Simon Cowell
4	28	18 August 2007	15 December 2007	Leon Jackson; Boys	Rhydian Roberts; Boys	8.57	Dannii Minogue
5	30	16 August 2008	13 December 2008	Alexandra Burke; Girls	JLS; Groups	10.51	Cheryl Cole
6	30	22 August 2009	13 December 2009	Joe McElderry; Boys	Olly Murs; Over 25s	13.00	Cheryl Cole
7	30	21 August 2010	12 December 2010	Matt Cardle; Boys	Rebecca Ferguson; Girls	14.13	Dannii Minogue
8	31	20 August 2011	11 December 2011	Little Mix; Groups	Marcus Collins; Boys	12.41	Tulisa
9	31	18 August 2012	9 December 2012	James Arthur; Boys	Jahméne Douglas; Boys	9.92	Nicole Scherzinger
10	32	31 August 2013	15 December 2013	Sam Bailey; Over 25s	Nicholas McDonald; Boys	9.69	Sharon Osbourne
11	34	30 August 2014	14 December 2014	Ben Haenow; Over 26s	Fleur East; Over 26s	8.98	Simon Cowell
12	28	29 August 2015	13 December 2015	Louisa Johnson; Girls	(Ghana) Reggie 'n' Bollie; Groups	8.02	Rita Ora
13	32	27 August 2016	11 December 2016	Matt Terry; Boys	(Finland) Saara Aalto; Over 25s	7.62	Nicole Scherzinger
14	28	2 September 2017	3 December 2017	Rak-Su; Groups	Grace Davies; Girls	6.34	Simon Cowell
15	28	1 September 2018	2 December 2018	(Jamaica) Dalton Harris; Boys	Scarlett Lee; Girls	5.75	Louis Tomlinson

- ^1 Winner and runner-up fields include both the participant's name and the category they were placed under in that year's competition.
- ^2 Viewing figure information is provided by the Broadcasters' Audience Research Board (BARB).

== Reception ==
=== Ratings ===
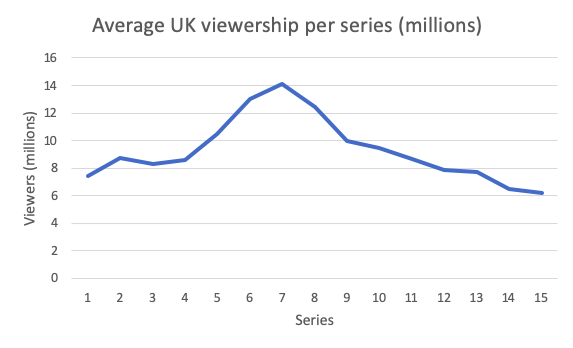
Graph showing the trend in UK viewership across the fifteen series, with The X Factor reaching its ratings peak by the seventh series in 2010.

When the programme initially began in 2004, its viewing figures fell behind those for the BBC's rival talent show Strictly Come Dancing. However, the situation changed in the following year, when the second series began to attract a larger audience share. While the second series attracted an average of over 8 million viewers during its broadcast, consecutive series increased these figures – peak audience figures for the fourth series' live final surpassed over 12.7 million viewers, achieving a share of 55% share of the terrestrial TV audience, while the sixth series achieved a peak audience of 19.1 million viewers and over 63% of the audience share during its broadcast. Viewing figures reached their peak by 2010, with the seventh series achieving average viewing figures of over 14 million viewers, and its live final achieving a peak audience of 19.4 million viewers.

In 2011, the eighth series achieved an average viewing figure of 12.4 million viewers during its broadcast, and was effectively overtaken in the ratings battle by Strictly Come Dancing, especially for its live final showing the beginning of a steep ratings decline. From 2012 onwards, ratings of The X Factor went into sharp decline – the tenth series achieved an average viewing audience of 8.5 million viewers, much less than Strictly Come Dancing, with later series proving less popular on Saturday evenings compared to other programmes, such as Michael McIntyre's Big Show and Planet Earth II.

By 2017, ratings for the programme were worse, with The X Factor achieving low average viewing figures of less than seven million viewers, effectively placing its future in doubt after the fifteenth series, and leading to its eventual cancellation.

=== Awards ===
At the 2005 British Comedy Awards, The X Factor beat Friday Night with Jonathan Ross and Ant & Dec's Saturday Night Takeaway to take the award for Best Comedy Entertainment Programme. This prompting Cowell to remark, "We're not a comedy programme, we're a serious factual drama". In both 2005 and 2006, The X Factor won the award for "Most Popular Entertainment Programme" at the National Television Awards. At the same awards in 2007, the show also won the award for "Most Popular Talent Show". In 2008 it lost out to Strictly Come Dancing at the TV Quick Awards, TRIC Awards and National Television Awards, despite beating it in the ratings. In 2010, The X Factor won "Best Talent Show" at the National Television Awards.

The show won the Entertainment award at the 2010 Royal Television Society Awards, described as "Undeniably a brilliant, genre-defining piece of television; the team behind this show never rest on their laurels and are determined to continually raise the bar and set new standards. Must-see television, which everyone talks about on a Monday morning." At the 2011 National Television Awards, The X Factor won the Talent Show award, beating Strictly Come Dancing, Britain's Got Talent and Dancing on Ice. At the 2012 National Television Awards, The X Factor again beat Strictly Come Dancing, Britain's Got Talent and Dancing on Ice to the award. The show also won Best UK TV Show at the 2012 Kids' Choice Awards. At the 2015 National Television Awards, The X Factor won Best Talent Show for the first time in three years, beating Strictly Come Dancing, Britain's Got Talent and The Voice UK.

== Controversies and criticism ==
From the outset, The X Factor has attracted heavy criticism. Recurring allegations include: that the excessive commercialism of the show detracts from its supposed purpose of unearthing musical talent and even actively damages and distorts the UK music industry; that auditionees at mass auditions are shabbily treated; that controversy is deliberately courted and orchestrated, and supposedly spontaneous scenes are staged and scripted; that problems with phone lines leave members of the public unable to vote for their favourite acts; and that contestants are manipulated and unfairly edited.

This criticism became very public in 2009 when a Facebook campaign targeted against The X Factor and its effect on British music took "Killing in the Name" by Rage Against the Machine to the Christmas number one spot at the expense of the X Factor winner's single by Joe McElderry.

The X Factor usually has at least one "novelty" or "joke" act in the live shows, which help to boost ratings and add some fun into the live shows, although they tend to be controversial due to the show being primarily a singing competition. Former judge Gary Barlow reportedly had an issue with joke acts when asked to mentor the Over 28s category in the ninth series, because "Gary doesn't like joke acts and the Overs category is often full of novelty acts." Despite controversially being part of the format, their non-involvement in the tenth series drew criticism, with Olly Mann of The Daily Telegraph arguing, "The fact that the joke contestants made it through to the live shows used to be the most gloriously British part of The X Factor. We love an underdog... It was a vital part of the format."

== International broadcasts ==
Country	Channel	Premiere date
Australia	Fox8	2017
Brazil	Sony	2014
Canada	CHEK-DT, Yes TV, Family Channel (29 July 2015)	2014
Denmark	DR3 (2014–2017), TV 2 Zulu (2018–)	2014
Ireland	TV3	2014
Malta	TVM	2014
Poland	Fox Life	2014
United States	AXS TV	2014
Singapore	Mediacorp Channel 5	2014
Slovakia	JOJ Plus	2015
Southeast Asia	Blue Ant Entertainment (formerly RTL CBS Entertainment)	2014
New Zealand	TV3	2015
New Zealand	TVNZ 1	2017
Finland	Sub	2016
Turkey	TV8,5	2017
Jamaica	TVJ	2018
Spain	TEN	2017

== Spin-offs ==
=== The Xtra Factor (2004–2016) ===
The Xtra Factor (known as The Xtra Factor Live in 2016) was a behind-the-scenes companion show that was broadcast on ITV2 in the UK and on TV3 in Ireland, usually on Saturday and Sunday nights after the main show, this aired from 4 September 2004 to 11 December 2016. On 18 January 2017, it was announced that The Xtra Factor would be axed after 13 years and would be replaced by an online show instead.

=== The X Factor: Battle of the Stars (2006) ===
The X Factor: Battle of the Stars was a celebrity special edition of The X Factor, which screened on ITV, starting on 29 May 2006 and lasting for eight consecutive nights. Pop Idol was intended to be broadcast in its place as Celebrity Pop Idol but was stopped shortly before transmission, when ITV selected The X Factor instead.

Nine celebrity acts participated, singing live in front of the nation and facing the judges of the previous The X Factor series: Cowell, Osbourne and Walsh. Voting revenues were donated to the celebrities' chosen charities. The contestants were Michelle Marsh, Nikki Sanderson, Matt Stevens, Lucy Benjamin, Gillian McKeith, Chris Moyles, Paul Daniels and Debbie McGee, James Hewitt and Rebecca Loos, and "The Chefs", a quartet of celebrity chefs comprising Jean-Christophe Novelli, Aldo Zilli, Paul Rankin and Ross Burden. The winner of the show was Lucy Benjamin, mentored by Walsh.

=== Xtra Bites (2017–2019) ===
Xtra Bites is the second companion and spin-off show to The X Factor which replaced The Xtra Factor, although Xtra Bites is an online spin-off show which started airing in 2017. The show looks at all the action from the show including behind the scenes footage of the judges and interviews with contestants from the show. It is uploaded onto ITV Hub, the show's YouTube channel, and the X Factor page on the Just Eat website. There were 13 episodes uploaded altogether for the first series, all presented by Becca Dudley. On 23 August 2018, it was announced that Xtra Bites would return for another series after a successful first series, with new presenters Dudley and Tinea Taylor. Vick Hope took over as host for the celebrity series in 2019.

=== The X Factor: Celebrity (2019) ===
A second edition of Battle of the Stars was confirmed in the latter half of 2019 as The X Factor: Celebrity and began in October 2019. The show was won by Megan McKenna, with Max and Harvey and Jenny Ryan finishing as runners-up.

=== The X Factor: The Band (2019) ===
In November 2019, Cowell announced that The X Factor: The Band would launch on 9 December 2019, with the premise of finding either the biggest male or female group. Each episode lasted for 90 minutes. The show was won by Real Like You, a girl group composed of Jess Folley, Virginia Hampson, Luena Martinèz, Seorsia Jack, Halle Williams and Kellimarie Willis.

== Music releases by The X Factor contestants ==
As of June 2015, the show has spawned a total of 35 number-one singles: 10 winners' singles (six of which have been the Christmas number one), four charity singles (one each by the finalists of series 5, 6, 7 and 8), and 21 other number-ones by contestants who have appeared on the show (including winners and runners-up).

By series 6 in 2009, it had seemingly become such a certainty that the X Factor winner would gain the Christmas number one slot every year that bookmakers William Hill were considering withdrawing from the 30-year tradition of betting on the outcome. However, hostility to the show's stranglehold on the Christmas number one slot from some quarters had prompted attempts to propel an alternative song to the 2008 Christmas number one spot, and in 2009 a similar internet-led campaign was successful, taking Rage Against the Machine's "Killing in the Name" to Christmas number one at the expense of The X Factor winner Joe McElderry. McElderry's single climbed to the top of the chart a week later.

In series 1–2, the winner's debut album would be released a few months after their victory in the show. The album would contain some new material but would consist largely of cover versions. This format changed with series 3 winner Leona Lewis. Cowell, Lewis's X Factor mentor and newly appointed manager, said: "We could have gone into the studio for a month, made the record quick, and thrown it out. It would have been the wrong thing to do." The success of Lewis's debut album Spirit ensured that the debut albums of future series winners (such as series 4 winner Leon Jackson) would consist more of new material than of cover versions. Series 10 winner Sam Bailey, however, released her debut album of covers, The Power of Love, in March 2014, just three months after winning – the earliest ever debut album release by an X Factor winner.

=== Charity singles ===
During the fifth series of the show, the contestants released a cover of Mariah Carey's "Hero" in aid of Help for Heroes which reached number one in the UK singles charts. Following the success of the song, Cowell announced that a charity single would be released annually (though the process was discontinued in series 9). He is quoted as saying: "Following last year's record we made with the X Factor finalists in aid of Help for Heroes, we decided we wanted to do something annually on the show to help good causes."

The 2009 contestants released a cover of Michael Jackson's "You Are Not Alone" which was released in aid of Great Ormond Street Hospital and reached number one.

The 2010 contestants released a cover of David Bowie's "'Heroes", with proceeds once again going to the Help for Heroes charity.

In 2011, the contestants released Rose Royce's "Wishing on a Star" and the proceeds were donated to Together for Short Lives. This song features previous contestants JLS and One Direction. In 2012, it was announced that the winner's single would also be the charity single.

The charity single was scrapped after series 8, although the winner's singles from series 9 onwards were all released for charity.

Year	Song	Peak chart positions		Certifications (sales thresholds)	Charity
Year	Song	UK	IRL	Certifications (sales thresholds)	Charity
2008	"Hero" (X Factor Finalists 2008)	1	1	UK: 2× Platinum	Help for Heroes
2009	"You Are Not Alone" (X Factor Finalists 2009)	1	1	UK: Gold	Great Ormond Street Hospital
2010	"Heroes" (X Factor Finalists 2010)	1	1	UK: Silver	Help for Heroes
2011	"Wishing on a Star" (X Factor Finalists 2011 featuring JLS and One Direction)	1	1		Together for Short Lives
2012	"Impossible" (James Arthur – series 9 winner's single)	1	1	UK: 2× Platinum	Together for Short Lives
2013	"Skyscraper" (Sam Bailey – series 10 winner's single)	1	1	UK: Silver	Together for Short Lives, Great Ormond Street Hospital
2014	"Something I Need" (Ben Haenow – series 11 winner's single)	1	2	UK: Platinum	Together for Short Lives
2015	"Forever Young" (Louisa Johnson – series 12 winner's single)	9	5		Together for Short Lives
2016	"When Christmas Comes Around" (Matt Terry – series 13 winner's single)	3	28		Together for Short Lives, Shooting Star Chase
2017	"Dimelo" (Rak-Su featuring Wyclef Jean and Naughty Boy – series 14 winner's single)	2	29		Together for Short Lives, Shooting Star Chase
2018	"The Power of Love" (Dalton Harris featuring James Arthur – series 15 winner's single)	4	35		Together for Short Lives, Shooting Star Chase

=== The X Factor – The Greatest Hits ===
In celebration of the show's 10th series, The X Factor – The Greatest Hits was released on 25 November 2013. The album features 34 songs from 21 of the show's contestants.

Disc 1
No.	Title	Writer(s)	Producer(s)	Length
1.	"Bleeding Love (Radio Edit)" (Leona Lewis)	Jesse McCartney; Ryan Tedder	Ryan Tedder	3:58
2.	"What Makes You Beautiful" (One Direction)	Rami Yacoub; Carl Falk; Savan Kotecha; Jim Jacobs; Warren Casey	Rami Yacoub; Carl Falk	3:18
3.	"Heart Skips a Beat" (Olly Murs featuring Rizzle Kicks)	Alex Smith; Samuel Preston; Jim Eliot; Jordan Stephens; Harley Alexander-Sule	Jim Eliot	3:22
4.	"Beat Again (Radio Edit)" (JLS)	Wayne Hector; Steve Mac	Steve Mac	3:19
5.	"Wings" (Little Mix)	Thomas Barnes; Peter Kelleher; Ben Kohn; Iain James; Perrie Edwards; Jesy Nelson; Leigh-Anne Pinnock; Jade Thirlwall; Erika Nuri; Michelle Lewis; Mischke Butler; Heidi Rojas	TMS	3:40
6.	"Bad Boys" (Alexandra Burke featuring Flo Rida)	Melvin K. Watson Jr; Larry Summerville Jr; busbee; Lauren Evans; Alex James; Tramar Dillard	The Phantom Boyz	3:26
7.	"Impossible" (James Arthur)	Arnthor Birgisson; Ina Wroldsen	Graham Stack; Matt Furmidge	3:29
8.	"Nothing's Real but Love" (Rebecca Ferguson)	Rebecca Ferguson; Eg White	Eg White	2:56
9.	"The Climb" (Joe McElderry)	Jessi Alexander; Jon Mabe	Quiz & Larossi	3:36
10.	"When We Collide" (Matt Cardle)	Simon Neil	Richard "Biff" Stannard; Ash Howes	3:43
11.	"Once" (Diana Vickers)	Cathy Dennis; Eg White	Mike Spencer	3:05
12.	"You Bring Me Joy" (Amelia Lily)	Annie Yuill; Brian Higgins; Carla Marie Williams; Fred Falke; Luke Fitton; Matt Gray; Miranda Cooper; Owen Parker; Toby Scott	Xenomania	3:51
13.	"No Promises" (Shayne Ward)	Jonas Schrøder; Lucas Sieber	Cutfather; Jonas Schrøder; Lucas Sieber	3:44
14.	"Carry You" (Union J)	Steve Mac; Claude Kelly		3:06
15.	"Do You Think of Me (Radio Edit)" (Misha B)	Misha B; Ben Kohn; Tom Barnes; Pete Kelleher; Ayak Thiik	TMS	3:50
16.	"Last Night (Beer Fear)" (Lucy Spraggan)	Lucy Spraggan	James Falnnigan; Samuel Preston	2:13
17.	"Swagger Jagger" (Cher Lloyd)	Cher Lloyd; Autumn Rowe; Jermaine Jackson; Andrew Harr; Andre Davidson; Sean Davidson; Marcus Lomax; Clarence Coffee Jr.	The Runners; The Monarch	3:12

Disc 2
No.	Title	Writer(s)	Producer(s)	Length
1.	"Troublemaker" (Olly Murs featuring Flo Rida)	Olly Murs; Steve Robson; Claude Kelly; Tramar Dillard	Steve Robson	3:03
2.	"Everybody in Love" (JLS)	Jonathan Rotem; Wayne Hector; Felicia Jensen; David D.A. Doman	J.R. Rotem	3:16
3.	"Little Things" (One Direction)	Fiona Bevan; Ed Sheeran	Jake Gosling	3:39
4.	"Run (Single Mix)" (Leona Lewis)	Gary Lightbody; Jonathan Quinn; Mark McClelland; Nathan Connolly; Iain Archer	Steve Robson	4:39
5.	"Cannonball" (Little Mix)	Damien Rice	Richard "Biff" Stannard; Ash Howes; Steve Mac	3:25
6.	"Hallelujah" (Alexandra Burke)	Leonard Cohen	Quiz & Larossi	3:39
7.	"You're Nobody 'til Somebody Loves You" (James Arthur)	James Arthur; Tom Barnes; Pete Kelleher; Ben Kohn	TMS	3:20
8.	"That's My Goal" (Shayne Ward)	Jörgen Elofsson; Jem Godfrey; Bill Padley	Per Magnusson; David Kreuger	3:40
9.	"With Ur Love" (Cher Lloyd featuring Mike Posner)	Shellback; Savan Kotecha; Max Martin; Mike Posner	Shellback	3:46
10.	"Backtrack" (Rebecca Ferguson)	Rebecca Ferguson; Jonny Lattimer	Jonny Lattimer; Tim Baxter	3:07
11.	"Seven Nation Army" (Marcus Collins)	Jack White	Matt Furmidge; Alex Smith; Brian Rawling	2:56
12.	"Run for Your Life" (Matt Cardle)	Gary Barlow	Gary Barlow	4:08
13.	"Home Run" (Misha B)	Misha B; MNEK	Misha B; MNEK	3:20
14.	"Lighthouse" (Lucy Spraggan)	Lucy Spraggan; Samuel Preston; James Flannigan	Samuel Preston; James Flannigan	3:21
15.	"Is This Love" (Aiden Grimshaw)	Aiden Grimshaw; Jarrad Rogers; Joel Pott	Jarrad Rogers	3:25
16.	"Ambitions" (Joe McElderry)	Cato Sundberg; Kent Sundberg; Simen M Eriksrud; Simone Larsen	Ray Hedges; Nigel Butler	2:57
17.	"Titanium" (Jahméne Douglas)	Sia Furler; David Guetta; Giorgio Tuinfort; Nick van de Wall		3:52

=== The X Factor Songbook ===
The X Factor Songbook is a 60-song compilation album released 24 November 2014.

Disc 1
No.	Title	Artist(s)	Length
1.	"Make You Feel My Love"	Adele	3:32
2.	"Listen"	Beyoncé	3:39
3.	"Stay with Me"	Sam Smith	2:52
4.	"All of Me"	John Legend	2:59
5.	"Ghost"	Ella Henderson	3:33
6.	"The A Team"	Ed Sheeran	4:18
7.	"Story of My Life" (Radio Edit)	One Direction	3:38
8.	"The One That Got Away"	Katy Perry	3:46
9.	"Fight for This Love"	Cheryl Cole	3:42
10.	"Just Give Me a Reason"	Pink featuring Nate Ruess	4:02
11.	"I Will Never Let You Down"	Rita Ora	3:23
12.	"All About That Bass"	Meghan Trainor	3:07
13.	"Only Love Can Hurt Like This"	Paloma Faith	3:52
14.	"Beneath Your Beautiful"	Labrinth featuring Emeli Sandé	3:56
15.	"Fallin'" (Radio Edit)	Alicia Keys	3:15
16.	"Say Something"	A Great Big World	3:49
17.	"Change Your Life" (Single Mix)	Little Mix	3:21
18.	"My Heart Will Go On"	Celine Dion	5:08
19.	"I Didn't Know My Own Strength"	Whitney Houston	3:39
20.	"Run" (Single Mix)	Leona Lewis	4:40

Disc 2
No.	Title	Artist(s)	Length
1.	"Home"	Michael Bublé	3:46
2.	"Angels"	Robbie Williams	4:20
3.	"Dance with Me Tonight"	Olly Murs	3:22
4.	"Locked Out of Heaven"	Bruno Mars	3:52
5.	"Hall of Fame"	The Script featuring will.i.am	3:21
6.	"Moves Like Jagger"	Maroon 5 featuring Christina Aguilera	3:21
7.	"She Makes Me Wanna"	JLS featuring Dev	3:39
8.	"I Want You Back"	Melanie B featuring Missy Elliott	3:26
9.	"Bad Boys"	Alexandra Burke featuring Flo Rida	3:26
10.	"A Moment Like This"	Kelly Clarkson	3:46
11.	"Your Song"	Ellie Goulding	3:08
12.	"Nothing's Real but Love"	Rebecca Ferguson	2:51
13.	"Skyscraper"	Demi Lovato	3:39
14.	"Angel"	Sarah McLachlan	4:00
15.	"Un-Break My Heart"	Toni Braxton	4:05
16.	"A Thousand Years"	Christina Perri	3:58
17.	"Impossible"	Shontelle	3:46
18.	"Valerie"	Mark Ronson featuring Amy Winehouse	3:36
19.	"Hey, Soul Sister"	Train	3:36
20.	"Rude"	Magic!	3:45

Disc 3
No.	Title	Artist(s)	Length
1.	"Back for Good"	Take That	4:02
2.	"Read All About It, Pt. III"	Emeli Sandé	4:43
3.	"Back to Black" (Radio Edit)	Amy Winehouse	3:12
4.	"Leave Right Now"	Will Young	3:30
5.	"Beautiful"	Christina Aguilera	3:59
6.	"The Climb"	Miley Cyrus	3:51
7.	"I Believe I Can Fly"	R. Kelly	3:15
8.	"I Can't Make You Love Me"	George Michael	5:20
9.	"Dance with My Father" (Radio Version)	Luther Vandross	4:25
10.	"Flying Without Wings"	Westlife	3:34
11.	"All by Myself" (Remastered)	Eric Carmen	4:31
12.	"Eternal Flame"	The Bangles	3:55
13.	"Whenever, Wherever"	Shakira	3:16
14.	"Torn"	Natalie Imbruglia	4:04
15.	"How You Remind Me"	Nickelback	3:41
16.	"Don't Stop Believin'"	Journey	4:10
17.	"Wherever You Will Go"	The Calling	3:27
18.	"How to Save a Life" (Single Mix)	The Fray	3:59
19.	"Many of Horror"	Biffy Clyro	4:17
20.	"Hallelujah"	Jeff Buckley	4:17

== Merchandise ==
DVDs

- Series 1: The X Factor Revealed: The Greatest Auditions Ever (2005)
- Series 2: The X Factor: The Greatest Auditions Ever (2006)
- Series 3: The X Factor Revealed (2007)

Games

- Series 4: The X Factor – interactive DVD game (2007)
- Series 4: The X Factor Sing – karaoke console game (2007)
- Series 5: The X Factor: The Board Game (2009)
- Series 5: Top Trumps X Factor – card game (2008)
- Series 7: The X Factor – karaoke console game (2010)

Books

- Series 1–3: The X Factor: Access All Areas (2007)
- Series 6: The X Factor Annual (2009)
- Series 7: The X Factor Annual (2010)
- Series 7: The Xtra Factor Annual (2010)
- Series 8: The X Factor Annual (2011)

Magazines

- X Magazine – weekly publication to accompany the seventh series in 2010.

Other

The X Factor brand has also appeared on clothing, jewellery, perfume, make-up, toiletries, bedding, gifts, confectionery, soft drinks and pizzas.

== Cancellation ==
While The X Factor had attracted a large degree of mass appeal from among the British public, and become a synonymous part of Saturday night television, after its peak in 2010, viewing figures declined by more than 50% over the next decade, with its final series aired in 2018. Although the programme was put into hiatus by Cowell in 2019, to give the format a break and determine how best to proceed with it, this hiatus continued on throughout 2020, until ITV formally announced in July 2021 that it had 'no current plans' for another series. At the time of its cancellation, the programme's overall format and presentation was described as having gone 'slightly stale' towards the end, with no major appeal to television audience.
