= National Diversity Awards =

British annual awards ceremony

- Sponsored by: Johnson & Johnson
- Country: United Kingdom
- Presented by: The Diversity Group
- First award: 2012
- Website: www.nationaldiversityawards.co.uk

The National Diversity Awards is an awards ceremony which honours positive role models, entrepreneurs and community organisations across several different strands within the equality and diversity sector. It is held annually in various venues across the United Kingdom.

Founded by CEO, Paul Sesay, the National Diversity Awards launched in 2012.

The National Diversity Awards 2019 took place at The Anglican Cathedral in Liverpool on 20 September 2019.

== Award strands and categories ==
The awards are honoured to individuals, charities and community organisations across five different strands: Age; Disability; Gender; LGBT; and Race, Faith and Religion.

The National Diversity Award categories include the Positive Role Model Award, the Community Organisation award, the Entrepreneur of Excellence Award, the Diverse Company award and Lifetime Achiever award.

Both the Positive Role Model Award and the Community Organisation Award are split into 5 individual categories, each representing an individual strand of diversity including Age, Disability, Gender, LGBT, Race/Faith/Religion. The Community Organisation category also has an additional multi-strand award.

The Entrepreneur of Excellence award "recognises individuals who have best demonstrated managerial expertise in assembling resources, creating an organisation, decision making under uncertainty, being forward looking, and creatively solving problems."

In addition to this, the Diverse Company award is an individual honour which recognises a company’s commitment to encouraging "people from the most deprived areas to further their careers"

The prestigious Lifetime Achiever award recognises a person’s "significant, innovative and cumulatively outstanding contributions to enhancing the practice of equality and diversity, devoting a major portion of their professional career to the cause."

== Nominations and judges ==
Nominations for the National Diversity Awards typically run between February and June of each year, with the awards being held annually in September.

The National Diversity Awards are judged each year by esteemed and highly experienced diversity professionals across the United Kingdom. Judges include Carol Jordan Head of Planning at ITV News, Manisha Mehrotra of Bloomberg LP, Former international Paralympian Ade Adepitan, Comedian and TV Presenter Alex Brooker, Writer, Director & Actor Jake Graf, and Writer, Activist and TV Presenter Katie Piper. Judges participate in an annual evaluation of all nominees with their shortlist being announced in July and their official award category winners being announced annually at the National Diversity Awards ceremony.

== Hosts ==
2012 saw the launch of the National Diversity Awards and was hosted by Irish television presenter and winner of the second series of Big Brother, Brian Dowling.

In 2013, Dowling was invited back to host the awards and was joined by co-host and CBeebies presenter, Cerrie Burnell, who was previously a celebrity patron of the event in 2012.

Dowling and Burnell were the official hosts of the National Diversity Awards 2014.

In 2015, Dowling was invited to yet again host the awards and was joined by co-host and ITV presenter, Charlene White.

== Venues ==
The National Diversity Awards are hosted in a different venue across the United Kingdom each year. The Awards launched at The Midland Hotel in Manchester on 21 September 2012, before moving to The Queens Hotel in Leeds on 20 September 2013. The Awards were then taken to the city's capital where the 2014 ceremony was held in The Hurlingham Club in London on 26 September.

The National Diversity Awards 2015 took place in The Anglican Cathedral in Liverpool on 18 September.

== Celebrity patrons ==
Since its launch in 2012, the National Diversity Awards has attracted support from several celebrity patrons who either represent or support the equality and diversity sector.

Amongst the National Diversity Awards celebrity patrons are contemporary R&B and hip hop artist, Misha B, Peter Tatchell; wheelchair Paralympic Quad double Gold medallist, Peter Norfolk OBE; Paralympic Gold medallist, cyclist and former swimmer, Jody Cundy; Paralympian volleyball player, Claire Harvey; stars of Channel 4 television documentary, My Transsexual Summer, Drew-Ashlyn Cunningham and Lewis Hancox; and transsexual beauty queen, Jackie Green.

Television presenter Cerrie Burnell was also a celebrity patron of the National Diversity Awards before taking on co-hosting duties with Brian Dowling in 2013.

== Celebrity endorsers ==
The National Diversity Awards has received a number of endorsements from celebrities across the United Kingdom, including Stephen Fry, who said:

"The UK is becoming more and more diverse. It is valuable that a national event is being held to celebrate our differences. Even now in today’s modern society we are still tackling issues of prejudice and discrimination so it is important to come together and focus on those who have demonstrated an outstanding work ethic in order to enhance equality, diversity and inclusion. I am sure The National Diversity Awards will have nothing but a positive outcome for years to come, I wish the event every success."

R&B and soul singer, Beverley Knight, is also an endorser of The National Diversity Awards, who supported the event by saying, "I love the idea that there is an awards ceremony that celebrates our differences and their positive effect on all our lives."

Other celebrities to give public backing towards the National Diversity Awards include Brian Blessed, Katie Piper, Trevor Nelson, Meera Syal, Gareth Thomas, Javine Hylton, Gina Yashere, Saira Choudhry, Lemar, Ross Adams, Philip Olivier, Tessa Sanderson, Chris Boardman, Ade Adepitan, Danny Crates, Karen Darke, Sarah Storey, Barney Storey Lenny Henry, Tom Daley, Ashley Walters, Letitia Hector, Alex Beresford and Amal Fashanu.

== Sponsors, media Sponsors and associates ==
The National Diversity Awards has been supported by current headline sponsor, Microsoft, since its launch in 2012.

Other organisations to have supported the National Diversity Awards through sponsorship include The Diversity Group, I Spoil U Media, Lloyds Banking Group, MI5 Security Service, Penna plc, The Army, PwC, Barclays, London School of Academics, Liverpool City Council, Mouchel/Kier Group, Financial Ombudsman Service, The Open University, Transport for London, ThoughtWorks, Riverside Housing, Easy Internet Solutions, Veredus, PSS, Cardiff School of Education, Merseyside Police Authority, The Co-Operative, Sky, The Excellence in Diversity Awards and Q Hotels.

The Awards have also been supported through several media sponsors including Gaydio, Gay Star News, The Voice (newspaper), Asian Lite, Gay Times and Able Magazine.

Associates and judges of the Awards have included Platform 51, The Fawcett Society, Runnymede Trust, DIVA, ENEI and Disability Rights UK.
