= Katie Waissel (album) =

Studio album by Katie Waissel
- Released: 14 March 2011
- Recorded: 2008–2010
- Genre: Rock, jazz, pop, folk, funk
- Length: 28:44
- Label: Chamberlain Records

Katie Waissel chronology
Songs from Under the Covers (2009)	Katie Waissel (2011)

Katie Waissel is the debut studio album by British singer-songwriter Katie Waissel, released on 14 March 2011.

== Background ==
The song "The Ugly Truth" premiered four days before the release of Katie Waissel. The day before the release of the album, she performed the song "The Ugly Truth" on The Alan Titchmarsh Show. The entire album is composed of songs recorded during her time on Green Eyed World, when she was signed to Chamberlain Records, this release concluding her two-record contract. Several of the songs can be heard as background music or as Katie performing them on Green Eyed World. Waissel spoke on the album:

“I’m so excited that this album is ready for a release. I co-wrote these songs so they mean a lot to me. To have the opportunity to share them with everyone is a dream come true for me.”

Other songs recorded with Chamberlain Records that have not featured on any release by Waissel but are available online are: a cover of "Love Me Tender", "Love, Life and Money", "Crystal Lagoon", "Ray of Light", "Whole Lotta Love", "Rock Steady!", and "Maybe". Katie Waissel did not chart on the UK Albums Chart, or see a full physical release. Since the album's release, Waissel has formed a four-member rock band named "Red Velvet", who are expected to release their own debut album.

== Track listing ==
No.	Title	Length
1.	"What's It Gonna Be"	3:30
2.	"He's in Love"	2:17
3.	"Daddy Didn't Want You"	3:59
4.	"The Ugly Truth"	3:07
5.	"A Little Strange"	3:06
6.	"Moving Mountains" (featuring The Private Life of David Reed ^{[a]})	4:56
7.	"Bone to Pick"	3:09
8.	"Love Is a Jungle"	3:38
9.	"Brighter than Sunshine"	3:09
10.	"Acapella Love ^{[b]}"	2:18
Total length:		28:44

=== Notes ===
a "Moving Mountains" was also previously included on The Private Life of David Reed's self-titled debut album, with Waissel under the alias of "Lola Fontaine".

b Acoustic version of "He's In Love"
