= Is This Love (Aiden Grimshaw song) =

Single by Aiden Grimshaw

from the album Misty Eye
- Released: 3 June 2012
- Recorded: 2012
- Genre: Pop; breakbeat
- Length: 3:25
- Label: RCA Records
- Songwriter(s): Aiden Grimshaw; Jarrad Rogers; Joel Pott
- Producer(s): Jarrad Rogers

Aiden Grimshaw singles chronology
"Is This Love" (2012)	"Curtain Call" (2012)

"Is This Love" is the debut single by English singer-songwriter Aiden Grimshaw, who finished ninth in the seventh series of The X Factor in 2010. The song was written by Grimshaw, Jarrad Rogers and Athlete frontman Joel Pott and was released on 3 June 2012 via RCA Records. It was released as the lead single from Grimshaw's debut album Misty Eye which was released 20 August 2012.

== Music video ==
The official music video was released on YouTube on 30 April 2012. Though being that of Grimshaw's song, the video only features Grimshaw himself for approximately two seconds, as an "extra". He is in a corridor of a club walking past two of the video's central actors.

== Critical reception ==
Robert Copsey of Digital Spy gave the song a positive review, stating:

Almost two years later, and he appears to have achieved the seemingly impossible. For those who remember his rendition of 'Mad World', the haunting and intensity levels have been dialled up a few more notches here as he struggles to deal with a difficult breakup. "The air is moving around me, but I can't breathe," he admits over a gritty and hectic melody of plinky synths and hardline D&B. For a man with dark problems, he makes this post-X Factor malarkey look remarkably simple..

== Track listing ==
Digital download
No.	Title	Length
1.	"Is This Love"	3:25
2.	"Is This Love" (Dorian Remix)	4:32
3.	"Is This Love" (DubVision Remix)	5:07
4.	"Is This Love" (Muffler Remix)	3:52

== Charts ==
Chart (2012)	Peak position
Ireland (IRMA)	87
Scotland (OCC)	39
UK Dance (OCC)	8
UK Singles (OCC)	35

== Release history ==
Region	Date	Format	Label
United Kingdom	3 June 2012	Digital download	RCA Records
