= The Excellence in Diversity Awards =

British award for employers

Excellence in Diversity Awards Logo

The Excellence in Diversity Awards is an awards ceremony which honours Inclusive Employers and Diversity Champions across all five different sectors. It is held annually in various venues across the United Kingdom.

Founded by current CEO, Paul Sesay, who is also the founder and CEO of I Spoil U Media, The National Diversity Awards and The Diversity Group, The Excellence in Diversity Awards launched in 2015.

The Excellence in Diversity Awards 2016 will take place at The Queens Hotel, Leeds on 12 May.

== Award Sectors & Categories ==
The awards are honoured to individuals & organisations across five different sectors: Charity; Education; Housing; Public; and Private. The Excellence in Diversity Awards consists of The Diversity Champion Award, The Diverse Company Award, The Employee of The Year Award, The Best Diversity Resource Award, Marketing Campaign of the Year Award, Outstanding Diversity Network Award, Head of Diversity & Inclusion Award and the Lifetime Achiever award.

The Diversity Champion and The Diverse Company award categories are split across five sectors: Housing, Education, Charity, Public and Private.

The Employee of The Year Award showcases the excellent commitment an employee has made into actively developing an inclusive workplace for fellow employees – where fairness, respect, equality, dignity, and autonomy are at the forefront of their values and promoted as part of their everyday goals and behaviour.

In addition to this, Best Diversity Resource Award recognises an organisation that has shown outstanding dedication to supplying diversity related resources such as jobsites, diversity training programmes, e-learning and diversity marks.

The Outstanding Diversity Network Award identifies the outstanding contribution of an employee network that has tackled issues internally or externally to influence change in the field of equality and diversity.

The Diversity Marketing Campaign of The Year Award identifies an innovative marketing campaign that has challenged discrimination and reflected the diversity of the UK through radio, television or print campaigns.

The Head of Diversity & Inclusion Award highlights the excellent achievements of the Head of Diversity within a particular organisation that has shown leadership, commitment and motivation – driving the diversity agenda throughout an organisation and the wider community.

The Lifetime Achiever award is another individual honours an individual who has devoted a major portion of their professional life to enhancing the practice of equality and diversity, making significant, innovative, and cumulatively outstanding contributions to the cause.

== Nominations & Judges ==
Nominations for The Excellence in Diversity Awards typically run between September and February of each year, with the awards being held later in May. The Excellence in Diversity Awards are judged each year by leading figures in diversity across the United Kingdom. Judges include Andy Woodfield of PwC, Miranda Wayland of ITV, Nate Parker of J.P. Morgan, Kasia Allan of CBI, Dianah Worman OBE of CIPD, Sharron Pegg of The Co-operative Group, Martin Hilditch of Inside Housing, Max Hyde of NUT, Andrew Hargreaves of UCAS, Jane Susan Campbell/Baroness Campbell of Surbiton, Mark Shrimpton of Disability Rights UK and Founder & CEO of The Excellence in Diversity Awards, Paul Sesay, who participate in an evaluation of nominees. Their recommendations for winners in various award categories are announced annually at The Excellence in Diversity Awards ceremony.

== Hosts ==
2015 saw the launch of The Excellence in Diversity Awards and was hosted by BBC Breakfast Presenter, Steph McGovern. The Excellence in Diversity Awards 2016 hosts are still yet to be confirmed.

== Venues ==
The Excellence in Diversity Awards are hosted in a different venue across the United Kingdom each year. The Awards launched at The Midland Hotel in Manchester on 14 May 2015.

The Excellence in Diversity Awards 2016 will be held at The Queens Hotel, Leeds, on 12 May 2016.

== Sponsors, Media Sponsors & Associates ==
The Excellence in Diversity Awards 2015 is supported by top inclusive employers such as J.P. Morgan, ITV & Action for Children.

Other organisations to have supported The Excellence in Diversity Awards through sponsorship and/or partnership include The National Diversity Awards, The Diversity Group, Diversity Today, I Spoil U Media, PwC, The Co-operative Group, UCAS, CIPD, Thomson Reuters, Northern Power Women, Inside Housing, NUT, Disability Rights UK & Q Hotels.

== History ==
The Excellence in Diversity Awards was founded by current CEO, Paul Sesay, who launched the awards in 2015. It is held annually in the United Kingdom to recognise and honour inclusive employers and diversity champions for their achievements within the equality and diversity sector.

=== 2015 ===
The first ceremony was held at The Midland Hotel in Manchester on 14 May 2015 and was hosted by Steph McGovern. The Awards were held in association with J.P. Morgan, with entertainment coming from 2014 UK Voice Winner, Jermain Jackman and Birmingham-based Bhangra Dance Group, Nachda Sansaar.

=== 2015 winners ===
The 2015 winners were as follows:

- Diversity Champion for Charity: Rev. Fred Osei Annin – Actionplus Foundation (UK)
- Diversity Champion for Education: Jiten Patel – The Open University
- Diversity Champion for Housing: Cam Kinsella – Merlin Housing Society
- Diversity Champion for Private: Jane Hatton – Evenbreak
- Diversity Champion for Public: Lindsey Ambrose – St Andrew's Healthcare
- Employee of the Year: Damian Kitson – ASDA
- Best Diversity Resource: Special iApps
- Outstanding Diversity Network: HSBC Balance Network
- Diverse Company for Charity: St Giles Trust
- Diverse Company for Education: The Open University
- Diverse Company for Housing: Gentoo
- Diverse Company for Private: ASDA
- Diverse Company for Public: Centro
- Diversity Marketing Campaign of the Year: Youth Media Agency #PressChange4Youth
- Head of Diversity & Inclusion: Sarah Churchman – PwC
- Lifetime Achiever: Julie Charles – Equalities National Council
