= Misha B =

British singer

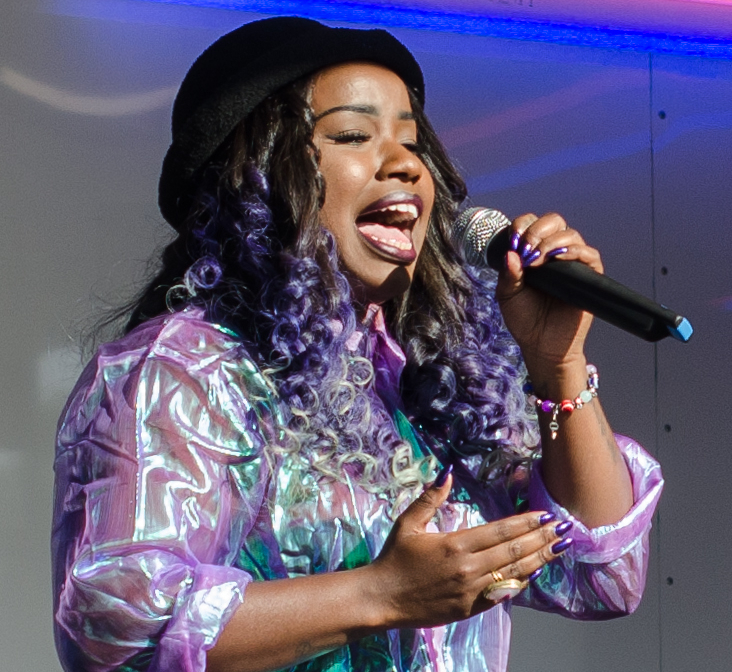
- Misha B at the Scottish Afro-Caribbean Carnival 2014

Background information
- Born: Misha Amber Bryan Garraway; 10 February 1992 (age 34); Manchester, England
- Genres: R&B; hip hop; pop; soul; dance
- Occupations: Singer; rapper; songwriter
- Years active: 2011–present
- Labels: Emboom; Relentless; RCA

Misha Amber Bryan (born 10 February 1992), known by her stage name Misha B, is a British singer. She rose to notability as a contestant on the eighth series of The X Factor in 2011, where she was the thirteenth contestant eliminated. Several publications have praised her use of rap-singing.

In April 2012, Misha B released a free mixtape entitled Why Hello World; it contained a sample of her debut single "Home Run", which charted at number 11 on the UK Singles Chart in July. Misha B released "Do You Think of Me" on 4 November 2012, which reached number 9 on the UK Singles Chart. In Autumn 2012, she supported American rapper Nicki Minaj on the United Kingdom leg of her Pink Friday: Reloaded Tour and was nominated as Best Newcomer at the MOBO Awards. In 2013, she released her second mixtape Knock Knock and her third single "Here's to Everything (Ooh La La)" which peaked at number 35 on the UK Singles Chart. Misha B is a joint patron of the UK's annual National Diversity Awards.

== Early life ==
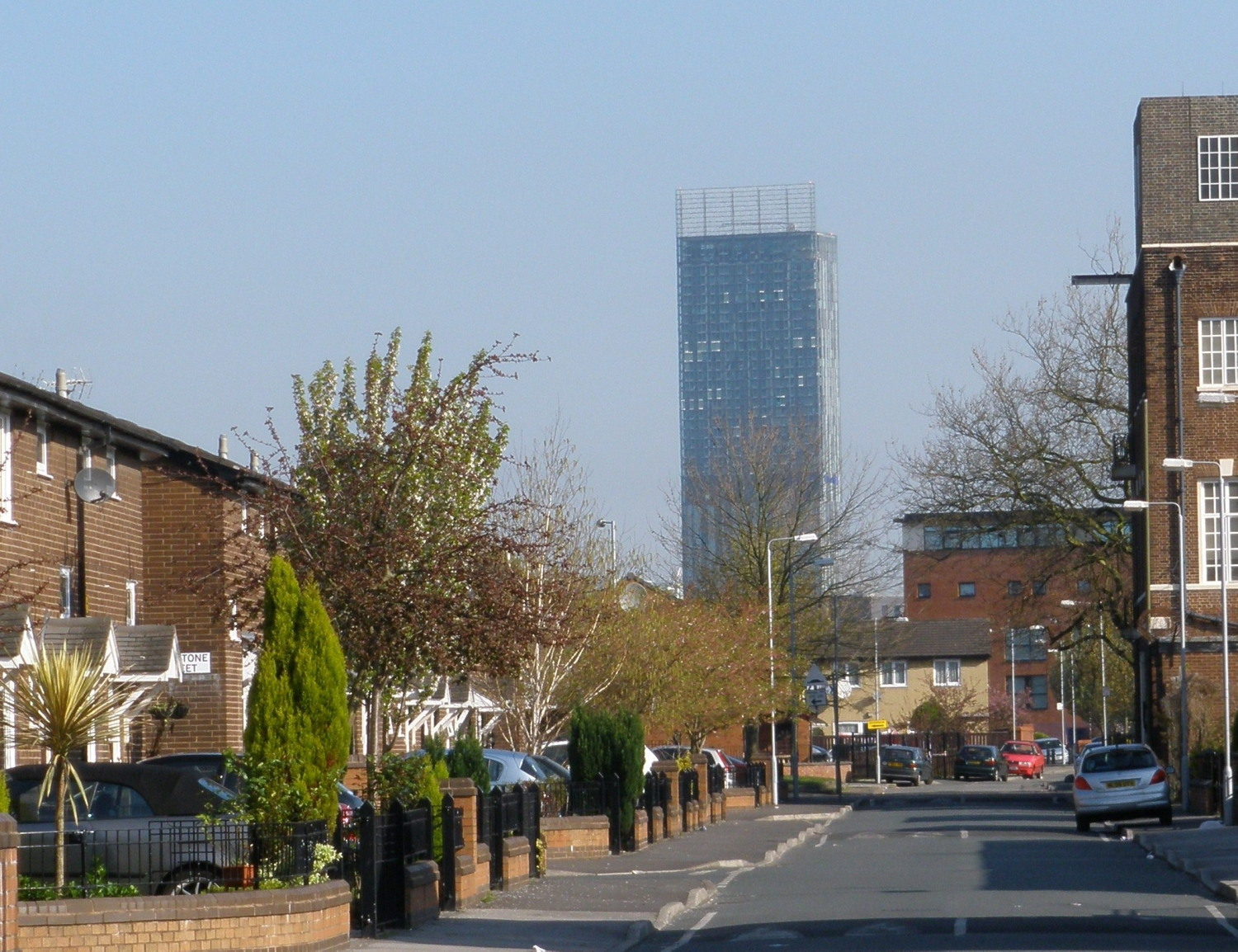
Misha B grew up in the Moss Side area of Manchester

Misha B was born Misha Amber Bryan on 10 February 1992, to Florence Bryan and an unknown father. She is of Jamaican heritage. From three months old Misha B and her sister were raised by their maternal aunt Lily. Misha B spoke of her upbringing, "I will always look upon Lily as my mum, I've never had that relationship with my birth mum... we don't know each other. But I respect the fact she carried me for all those months, but when it comes to my mum Lil...she's a great role model in everything she does."

Misha B grew up in the Longsight, Hulme and Moss Side districts of Greater Manchester. As a teenager Misha B attended Trinity C.E. High School in Hulme, where she played football for the Manchester United under-16s. She started by writing poetry, moved on to rapping and then progressed to singing. Misha B began to take her vocals abilities more seriously aged fourteen - describing music as her only outlet and saying that singing assisted her self-understanding.

Aged 18, in 2010 she joined a vocal artist course at the Manchester Music Base, at Trafford College in Manchester. There, she was coached by Leanne Brown, who as part of Sweet Female Attitude, had a hit in 2000 with "Flowers". Misha B entered the Manchester open mic circuit aged eighteen, and performed as a busker outside Manchester's Arndale Centre to tackle her stage fright.

== Career ==
=== The X Factor ===
Misha B's breakthrough into the music industry came in 2011, through her appearance on the eighth series of The X Factor. In her first audition in front of judges Louis Walsh, Gary Barlow, Kelly Rowland and Tulisa, she sang Aretha Franklin's cover of "Respect". The Voice recounted her performance as being "confident" and "show-stopping", and as a promising sign of Misha B's future in the competition. Noted for her "Lauryn Hill-like rap-singing style", she progressed through to bootcamp and then to judges' houses, where she was put through to the live shows by Rowland in her Girls category (individual female contestants aged 16–24) alongside Amelia Lily, Janet Devlin and Sophie Habibis. A variety of sources including The Daily Telegraph, Digital Spy and bluesandsoul.com have regarded Misha B as one of the more gifted and exciting acts ever to have come out of a talent competition. BBC 1xtra noting her "show-stopping performances", considered her to be one of the most credible artists to emerge from the show and a "break from the traditional X Factor contestant". In a review of the series, The Daily Telegraph picked her performance of "Rolling in the Deep" (Adele) as one of the highlights of the series, saying she "oozed star quality from the start... Like a 21st century Grace Jones or an urban Lady Gaga, the teenager seemed like a proper pop star already."

Misha B was in the bottom two in week 4 with Sophie Habibis but was saved by Walsh, Tulisa and Rowland, later Barlow confirmed he would have saved her if he had to vote. However voting statistics revealed that Habibis received more votes than Misha B meaning if the result went to deadlock, Habibis would have been saved. Misha B ended up in the bottom two a second time in week 6, this time with Kitty Brucknell and was saved again. However, Brucknell received more votes from the public than Misha B meaning if the result went to deadlock, Brucknell would have been saved. The following week, Misha B finished second in the public vote, receiving 22.5% which gave her a place in the quarter-final in week 8. Misha B was in the bottom two for the third time in the quarter-final with Janet Devlin but was saved, as Walsh and Tulisa voted to send her through while Rowland abstained from voting between her two acts, and Barlow confirmed he would have voted to send her through if he had to vote. However, voting statistics revealed that Devlin received more votes than Misha B meaning if the result went to deadlock, Devlin would have advanced to the semi-final. After receiving the fewest votes in the semi-final in week 9, Misha B was eliminated from the show.

Misha B was involved in a controversy during the third live show when Tulisa accused her of making "mean comments" and Louis Walsh accused her of being a "bully" to other contestants backstage. No evidence was ever provided to support either allegation and both accusers apologised the next day. The other two judges and her fellow contestants defended Misha B during and after the show, and Barlow later said he believed the wrongful allegations had ended Misha B's chances of winning the competition. Misha B was asked about her experience on The X Factor and said "I one hundred percent appreciate the platform it gave me...but it's not for the faint-hearted lol. You have to remember that at the end of the day it's an entertainment show for TV." "Things are said which are out of all of our hands as contestants. I wasn't asked any questions, I was just accused."

Misha B's performances during The X Factor

Show	Song choice	Theme	Result
Auditions	"Respect" (Aretha Franklin)	Free choice	Advanced
Bootcamp 1	"Born This Way" (Lady Gaga)	Bootcamp challenge	Advanced
Bootcamp 2	"Survivor" (Destiny's Child)	Bootcamp songs	Advanced
Judges' houses	"Fly" (Nicki Minaj featuring Rihanna)	Free choice	Advanced
Live show 1	"Rolling in the Deep" (Adele)	Britain vs America	Saved by Rowland
Live show 2	"Would I Lie to You?" (Charles & Eddie)	Love and heartbreak	Safe (5th)
Live show 3	"Purple Rain" (Prince)	Rock	Safe (3rd)
Live show 4	"Tainted Love" (Soft Cell)	Halloween	Bottom two (10th)
Live show 5	"Proud Mary" (Creedence Clearwater Revival)	Dancefloor fillers	Safe (3rd)
Live show 6	"Born this Way" (Lady Gaga)	Lady Gaga vs. Queen	Bottom two (7th)
Live Show 7	"I Have Nothing" (Whitney Houston)	Movies	Safe (2nd)
Quarter-Final	"Girls Just Want To Have Fun" (Cyndi Lauper)	Guilty pleasures	Bottom two (5th)
Quarter-Final	"Killing Me Softly With His Song" (Roberta Flack)	Musical heroes	Bottom two (5th)
Semi-Final	"Dancing in the Street" (Martha and the Vandellas)	Motown	Eliminated (4th)
Semi-Final	"Perfect" (P!nk)	Song to get you to the final	Eliminated (4th)

=== Why Hello World ===
Shortly after Misha B left The X Factor, she performed a live freestyle F64 for SB.TV on 24 December 2011. In February 2012 it was announced that she had signed a record deal with the Relentless Records; Charlene Grant from Modest! Management was responsible for her management. She then began touring as part of The X Factor Top 9 contestants from 25 February to 4 April. Whilst on the tour, Misha B spent time working on her first mixtape, Why Hello World, mixed by DJ Stylus and released for free download on 27 April. The following week it became BBC Radio 1Xtra's mixtape of the week. The mixtape features a collection of original material including samples of original songs – "Big Dreaming", "Last Forever" and "Home Run" (plus covers of "Rolling in the Deep", "Mirror", "Unpretty", "Run the World", "Crew Love" and "Climax"). The mixtape received positive reviews and gained over 16,000 downloads and 25,000 streams.

Her debut single "Home Run", co-written and produced by British songwriter MNEK, was released on 15 July by Relentless Records and charted at number 11 on the UK Singles Chart. The music video for the single which was directed by Rohan Blair-Mangat, premiered on 15 June. An accompanying EP was released, with remixes from artists including Kat Krazy and Zed Bias; and she recorded various performances of "Home Run", including an acoustic version for i-D magazine and for SB.TV on 11 July. Misha B performed "Home Run" at both the nominations and awards ceremony for the MOBO Awards. She also performed "Home Run" at the BBC 1Xtra Live 2012 concert at the Manchester Apollo, singing Adele's "Rolling in the Deep" and a new song "Runway"; duetting with Daley on his single Remember Me covering for Jessie J.

Misha B headlined Manchester Pride on 27 August with crowds of 150,000 to celebrate LGBT culture. 21 October to 7 November 2012, Misha B toured as Nicki Minaj's support act on the United Kingdom leg of the Pink Friday: Reloaded Tour.

Her second single, "Do You Think of Me", co-written by herself, Ayak Thiik and TMS and co-produced by herself and TMS, was released on 4 November, and the music video was released on 8 October. "Do You Think of Me" peaked at number 9 on the UK Singles Chart on 11 November. The Official Charts Company recorded that the single reached numbers 3 and 2 on their 1Xtra Singles Top 40 chart and VH1 Urban Chart Top 20, respectively on 10 November. In October, performed an acoustic version for Trevor Nelson's 1Xtra Live Lounge, plus a cover of Labrinth and Emeli Sande's "Beneath Your Beautiful". Misha B also performed an acoustic cover for MSN, plus a Halloween-themed acoustic cover of Michael Jackson's Thriller.

"Ride or Die", the B-side to Angel's "Time After Time", featured Misha B and was released on 29 November, with a music video published a week later on 6 December. The track was composed by Misha B, Sirach Charles (Angel) and Kassa Alexander. 4music described their joint work as "pretty impressive, pretty soulful and pretty darn emotional too!"

=== Knock Knock ===
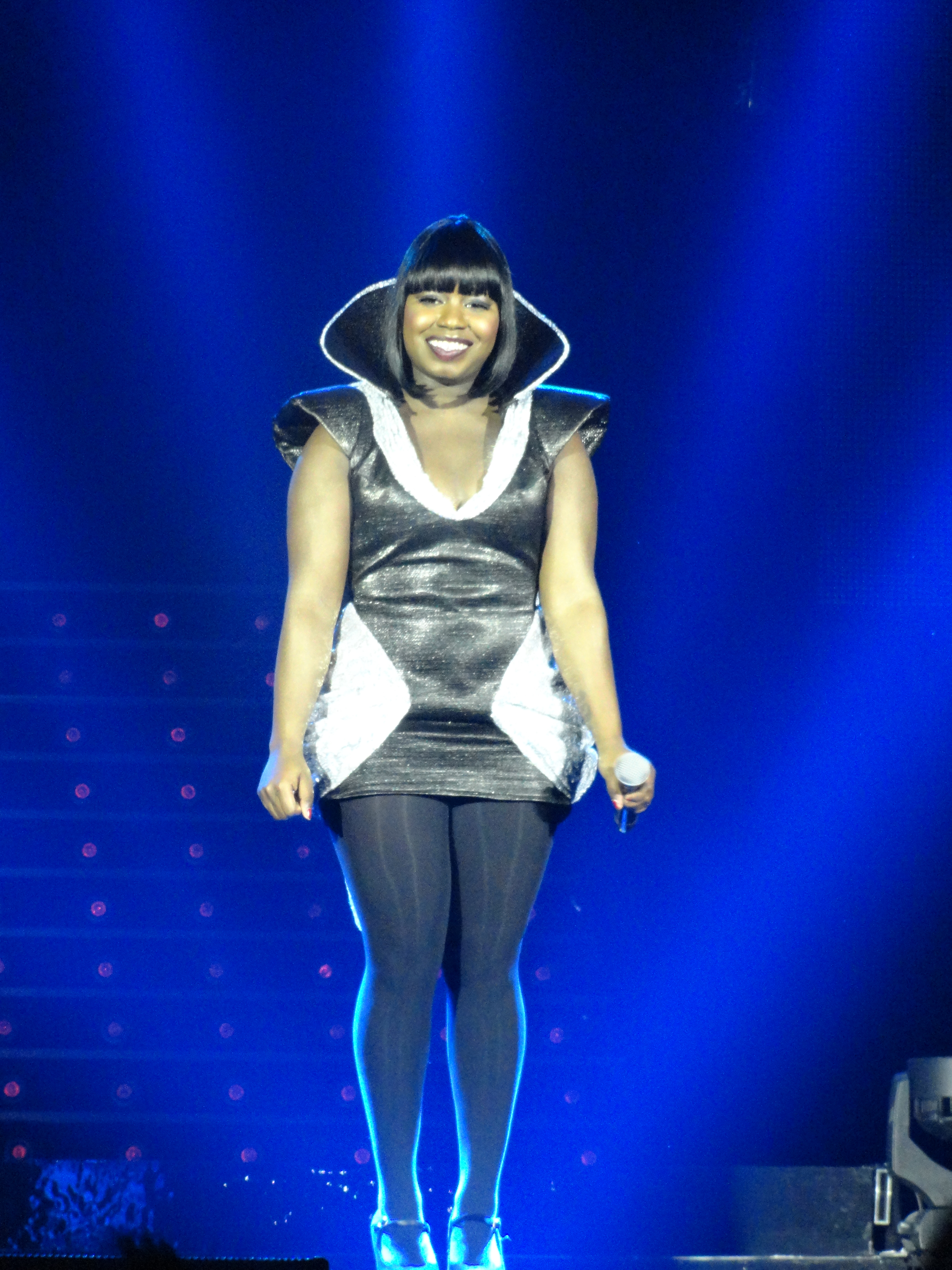
Misha B in 2012

In January 2013, Misha B headlined the half-time show for the American National Basketball Association (NBA) game between the Detroit Pistons and New York Knicks in London. "Here's to Everything (Ooh La La)" was premiered on The Hits Radio in February. A lyric video and an official video followed in February and March, respectively. On 12 February, she released her second mixtape, Knock Knock, which contained six snippets of original songs (including "Here's To Everything", "Alien Avenue / I Need a Dollar", "Ugly Love" and "Silent Cry") and two covers Otis Redding's "Respect" and an a cappella version of American girl-group SWV's song "Weak".

During 2013, Misha B performed at various locations including Clyde Auditorium, the farewell party for Lord Mayor Gavin Robinson and the JLS Foundation and Cancer Research UK fundraiser in London. She also performed her first non-European gig at the NRJ Music Tour 2013 in Beirut, Lebanon. She continued performing, including at the Yahoo Wireless Festival, V Festival and Manchester Pride Festival. On 10 August, she sang the National Anthem at Wembley Stadium for the annual FA Community Shield fixture.

On 21 August Misha released a free freestyle rap called "MishStyle". that revisited her "fiery" rap roots, while "proudly showcasing her versatility". In September, Misha B joined Krept and Konan in an acoustic session for SBTV of their "disturbingly evocative" autobiographical rap "My Story" from their UK top ten album charting "Young Kingz" mixtape. On 25 July 2013, her second single "Do You Think of Me" was included in The X Factor's "ultimate mash-up" (a video trailer for the show's tenth series) of tracks by 13 former contestants chosen to represent a decade of The X Factor's influence on the UK charts, and her first two singles were included on The X Factor - The Greatest Hits compilation. Autumn 2013 she released a video of a jam session of herself and some of her 'BombSquad' performing "Swimming Pools (Drank)" by Kendrick Lamar, and in an interview with on BBC 1xtra Misha B informed CJ Beatz that intended to release her debut album after her fourth official single release. For the delayed album she has collaborated with Emeli Sandé, MNEK, Mr Hudson, TMS, Cutfather and Naughty Boy.

On 4 March 2014 Misha B announced that she had left her old label and that she had set up her own label and brand, Emboom, under which intends to release her music, and in the future sign other acts and diversify. On 1 April 2014 Misha B released an original track called "Where Did We Go" from her forthcoming EP on SoundCloud. During the summer of 2014 Misha B appeared at Rock Assembly in Wembley arena.

== Musical style and influences ==
Misha B's has been described by 4 Music as having "powerful and soulful vocals", and "powerhouse R&B vocals". BBC 1xtra said she had a "huge soulful voice". NME's reviewing Do You Think of Me noted her "stupendous" vocals. The Redbrick student publication reviewing Misha B's live performance on the Nicki Minaj tour said "It was great to hear that her voice, which sounds powerful on recordings and post-production, was just as good, if not even better, when performing live." Misha B has been compared to several female artists, grammy.com noted that her singing and rapping abilities were similar to Lauryn Hill. She has also been compared to American rapper and singer Missy Elliott, fellow American singers Chaka Khan, Jennifer Hudson, Trinidadian rapper Nicki Minaj, and American singers Tina Turner, Grace Jones and Eartha Kitt. SoulBounce described her vocals as "stylistically speaking... falling in line somewhere between Missy Elliott's quirkiness and Lauryn Hill's raw soulfulness". Misha B has noted the comparisons to Missy Elliott, but considers them to be artistically different. Misha B has recognised the musical influences of growing up in Moss Side (especially during the local carnival and parade season) and the influence of American entertainer and pop icon Michael Jackson and other artists including musicians Stevie Wonder, Tina Turner, Missy Elliott and rapper-singer Lauryn Hill.

Misha B has said that her music style can best be described as "free", and that she does not want to be boxed in by any one style. SBTV considered Misha B capable of performing in any genre. Regarding her own releases Home Run is a fusion of multiple genres – R&B, hip-hop, dance, pop, soul, reggae, drum and bass, combined with Misha's 'soulful vocals'. Do You Think of Me is an up-tempo R&B track that fuses urban and dance music, with its "90s club-meets-tribal-flavour". While her third release fused R&B with reggae, pop, drum & bass elements. In separate interviews she has said "one thing that's the same in all my songs is that drum beat, that kick" and "drums and rhythm are a real priority to me". Misha B frequently performs covers - amongst them in September 2012, she covered Alicia Keys' track "Girl on Fire" described by one critic as that "awkward moment when someone sings your new song better than you", the following month she covered "Diamonds" (Rihanna song). She also covered Hip Hop hits - Jay Z and Kanye West's "No Church in the Wild", and in July 2014 Tupac's 1998 hit Do for Love "breathing harmony into the song with a refreshingly unadorned approach that's transcended by her relentless passion and drive for self-expression." Bryan has said that while soul was the 'foundation', she loved combining singing and rapping and is noted for adding her own raps to covers - "how do you make Aretha Franklin's 'Respect' even more sassy? with a rap, of course!" Bryan also included rap breaks in her covers of Adele's "Rolling in the Deep" and Cyndi Lauper’s "Girls Just Want To Have Fun" while she was on The X Factor. and Drake's "Started from the Bottom", again Misha B "drops her own lyrics on the song" "reflecting on the harsh realities of her childhood" - she spits: 'Mummy was a crack fiend, I was crack born, Daddy never has been Daddy at all' and reflects on her musical career post X Factor.

== Charity work ==
Misha B, alongside Jody Cundy, Peter Norfolk, Peter Tatchell, is a joint patron of the UK's National Diversity Awards, an annual event which recognises positive role models and organisations who are connected to diversity in the United Kingdom. In 2013 she was quoted as saying that the awards were a "great opportunity to recognise and celebrate diversity."

In December 2012, Misha B appeared in "The Taking Care of Christmas" on 4Music (as part of a partnership with youth charity vinspired) which highlighted the benefits of volunteering for a good cause and how it can make job applicants more attractive to prospective employers. Noting that "busking played such an important part at the beginning" of her career, in 2013 Misha took part in an annual busking competition which in March 2013 attracted 4,500 entrants. Later that year Misha B supported the launch of an initiative by The Children's Society on 19 November 2013, that seeks to tackle the high levels of poverty and neglect faced by an estimated 150,000 vulnerable children and young people living in the Greater Manchester area. "I can relate to what some of these young people are going through and now, I'm in a position to raise awareness of the issues behind problems." "I know that, like me, they can escape the poverty trap if they have the right support, and if services work together more so that less children slip through the net." In 2013 Misha B also designed a cushion for BBC Children in Need annual children's charity event.

She actively supports the BT Digital Champions initiative, a project set up by BT's Better Future programme and children's charity the Transformation Trust, that encourages young people to share their internet knowledge to help others get on-line. As a reward for helping others, the pupils win the chance to attend the Rock Assembly concert at Wembley in which Misha B along with other artists performed in 2013 and 2014.

== Nominations ==
Misha B has received three nominations for her work in music, including Best Newcomer at the 2012 MOBO Awards.

Year	Organisation	Award	Nominated work	Result
2012	MOBO Awards	Best Newcomer	Herself	Nominated
2012	4music Video Honours	Best Breakthrough Artist	Herself	Nominated
2013	Official Mixtape Awards	Best Female Artist of 2012	Herself	Nominated

== Discography ==
=== Mixtapes ===
Title	Details
Why Hello World	Release date: 27 April 2012; Label: Relentless; Formats: digital download
Knock Knock	Release date: 12 February 2013; Label: Relentless; Formats: digital download

=== Singles ===
Title	Year	Peak chart positions			
Title	Year	UK	UK R&B	IRE	SCO
"Home Run"	2012	11	2	46	13
"Do You Think of Me?"	2012	9	1	57	11
"Here's to Everything (Ooh La La)"	2013	35	7	—	36
"Rosa Parks Flow"	2018	—	—	—	—
"Letter to my Sistars"	2019	—	—	—	—
"—" denotes single that did not chart or were not released.

=== Promotional singles ===
List of featured singles
Single	Year
"For Love"	2014
"Herbal Tea"	2019

=== As featured artist ===
Single	Year	Peak chart positions			Note
Single	Year	UK	IRL	SCO	Note
"Wishing on a Star" (as part of The X Factor finalists 2011 featuring JLS and One Direction)	2011	1	1	1	Charity single
"Ride or Die" (Angel featuring Misha B)	2012	—	—	—	Time After Time (Remixes) – EP
"Floodgates (Part 2)" (Charlie Brown featuring Misha B)	2013	—	—	—	Floodgates (Remixes) – EP
The Ultimate X Factor Mash Up (featuring Misha B)	2013	—	—	—	–
"—" denotes single that did not chart or were not released.

=== Music videos ===
Song	Year	Director(s)
"Wishing on a Star"	2011	
"F64"	2011	Jamal Edwards
"Home Run"	2012	Rohan Blair-Mangat
"Do You Think of Me?"	2012	Ben And Nicole
"Ride or Die" (Angel featuring Misha B)	2012	Adam Deacon & Paul Akinrinlola
"Started From The Bottom (Drake Cover)"	2013	Joshua Reeves
"Here's to Everything (Ooh La La)"	2013	Justin Dickel

== Tours ==
Opening act

- Pink Friday: Reloaded Tour (2012)

Headlining

- The X Factor Live Tour (2012)
