= Katie Waissel =

English singer-songwriter (born 1986)

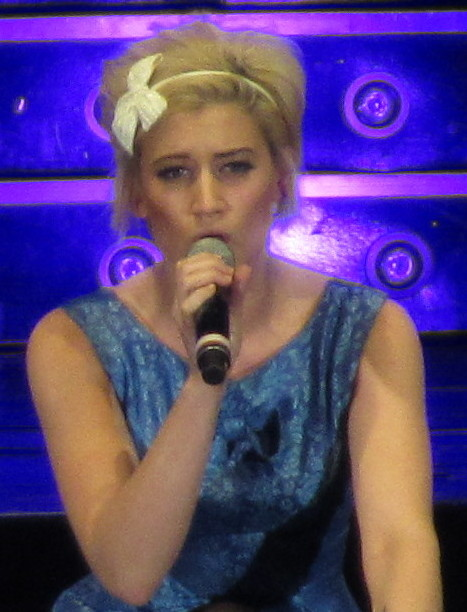
- Waissel in Glasgow on The X Factor 2011
- Born: 24 January 1986 (age 40); London, England
- Occupations: Singer, Television Personality, Founder of O.W.H.L - Revolutionising Safety for all in the Creative Industries
- Years active: 2010–present
- Spouses: Brad Alphonso (m. 2012; div. 2012) Brian Moote (m. 2015; div. 2017)
- Children: 1
- Website: www.owhl.co.uk

Katie Waissel (born 24 January 1986) is an English singer-songwriter, television personality, entrepreneur and campaigner for safeguarding the creative industries. She first became widely known as a contestant on the seventh series of The X Factor in 2010 and later appeared on Celebrity Big Brother. Waissel subsequently studied law and founded O.W.H.L, an organisation focused on welfare, human rights and safeguarding within the creative industries. She has contributed to public discussions on industry reform, including submitting evidence to the UK Parliament’s Women and Equalities Committee inquiry into misogyny in music.

== Career ==
=== 2008–10: Early career and Green Eyed World ===
In mid-to-late 2009, Waissel starred in an interactive, online reality show Green Eyed World, sponsored by Sprite. The show focused on her journey in the US and Europe in hopes of a record label in 14 episodes of roughly 5 minutes in length each. Sprite experimented with the world's first YouTube/Facebook digital connection.

During her time on the show, Waissel shot a music video for her song "Live and Learn" and released a five-track EP, Songs from Under the Covers under "KatieVRecords". A song recorded at the time, a duet with The Private Life of David Reed "Moving Mountains", later appeared on their self-titled album during her time on The X Factor under the alias "Lola Fontaine". Waissel has been on tour with East 17 and Andy Abraham Sometime after the show, Waissel performed in Hollywood for Paris Hilton together with friend and fellow contestant X Factor Storm Lee.

=== 2010: The X Factor ===
Before auditioning for The X Factor, Waissel had worked as a receptionist, waitress and once worked at OK! magazine. At her audition, she wanted to sing "At Last" by Etta James, but Simon made her pick another song before she even started singing. Eventually, after forgetting the lyrics to We Are the Champions, she was allowed to sing her original song. She then sang At Last by Etta James, and was put through to bootcamp by Cheryl and Simon Cowell. At bootcamp, she sang "Make You Feel My Love" and reacted with shock when she was the first girl put through to the judges houses. She performed the song "Smile" in front of Cheryl and will.i.am at the judges' houses stage, and had to stop to compose herself after crying, stating that "it's an emotional song for me". Despite stumbling through her song for the second time, Cheryl picked her as one of her final three girls.

In week 1 of the live shows, she sang "We Are the Champions". She was put in the bottom three as a result of the public vote, but because Nicolo Festa polled the fewest votes, Waissel had to sing in the final showdown with F.Y.D., the other bottom three act from week 1. She sang "Don't Let Me Down" in the final showdown and was saved from elimination by the judges by a majority vote, with only Cowell (F.Y.D.'s mentor) voting against her while Cole, Dannii Minogue and Louis Walsh voted to save Waissel. Voting statistics revealed that F.Y.D. received more votes than Waissel meaning if Walsh sent the result to deadlock, F.Y.D. would have been saved.

In the second week of the live shows, Katie sang "I'd Rather Go Blind". She managed to avoid the bottom three this week and secured a place to the third week, where she sang "I Wan'na Be Like You". In the fourth week, she sang "Bewitched" and was in the final showdown with Belle Amie. The result went to deadlock this time, but Waissel was announced as safe when it was revealed that Belle Amie had the fewest votes. She was in the final showdown again the next week after performing "Don't Speak" but was saved by a majority vote over Treyc Cohen when Cole refused to vote against either acts of hers but wanted to vote last to send the result to deadlock but wasn't allowed to. Cowell and Walsh voted to eliminate Cohen and only Minogue voted to eliminate Waissel. Voting statistics revealed that Cohen received more votes than Waissel meaning if Cole was allowed to send the result to deadlock, Cohen would have been saved.

Waissel was in the final showdown for a third successive week when she sang "Saturday Night's Alright for Fighting", and this had been the fourth time Waissel had been in the final showdown. The result went to deadlock, but the public vote showed Aiden Grimshaw received fewer votes and he was eliminated. This was the first time in the show's history that a contestant was put into the final showdown four times and survived. In the quarter-final, she performed "Sex on Fire" and "Everybody Hurts". In the series' third double elimination, Waissel received the fewest votes and was automatically eliminated.

Waissel performed the following songs on The X Factor:

Show	Song choice	Theme	Result
Auditions	"At Last"	Free choice	Through to bootcamp
Bootcamp	"Make You Feel My Love"	Free choice	Through to home visits
Home visits	"Smile"	Free choice	Through to live shows
Live show 1	"We Are the Champions"	Number-one singles	Bottom three (15th)
Final Showdown (Live Show 1)	"Don't Let Me Down"	Free choice	Saved by judges' vote
Live show 2	"I'd Rather Go Blind"	Heroes	Safe (8th)
Live show 3	"I Wan'na Be Like You"	Guilty Pleasures	Safe (8th)
Live show 4	"Bewitched"	Halloween	Bottom two (10th)
Final Showdown (Live Show 4)	"Trust in Me"	Free choice	Saved by public vote
Live show 5	"Don't Speak"	American anthems	Bottom two (10th)
Final Showdown (Live Show 5)	"Don't Give Up on Me"	Free choice	Saved by judges' vote
Live show 6	"Saturday Night's Alright for Fighting"	Songs by Elton John	Bottom two (8th)
Final Showdown (Live Show 6)	"Save Me From Myself"	Free choice	Saved by public vote
Live show 7	"Help!"	Songs by The Beatles	Safe (2nd)
Quarter-Final	"Sex on Fire"	Rock	Eliminated (7th)
Quarter-Final	"Everybody Hurts"	Rock	Eliminated (7th)

=== 2011–13: Katie Waissel, Red Velvet and X Factor 2011 Live Tour ===
Shortly before her elimination, it was revealed Jay-Z had an interest in signing Waissel and fellow X Factor contestant Cher Lloyd to his label, Takeover Roc Nation. These plans did not materialise. On 17 March 2012 Waissel released her self-titled debut album on Chamberlain Records, which consists of recordings from her time on Green Eyed World. The song "The Ugly Truth" was used to promote the album – she performed the song on The Alan Titchmarsh Show, The Late Late Show, and embarked on a short shopping mall tour – although it was not released as a single. In June 2011, Waissel announced she was working on another album, and promised it would be a "dirty, sexy, rock 'n' roll" album. In July, she revealed her new band, called "Red Velvet Lovers".

In May 2013, Red Velvet released their first song for free download, entitled "I'm Fine", about Waissel's failed marriage to Alphonso, adding a message on her Twitter page thanking her fans for their support. Three more songs, "F*ck You", "High Fashion", and "Say It", were released for free download in June.

=== 2016: Celebrity Big Brother ===
Katie Waissel competed in Celebrity Big Brother 18 in 2016. Fellow housemate Christopher Biggins was removed after making remarks which Channel 5 said were "capable of causing widespread offence". He told Waissel, who is Jewish: "You better be careful or they'll be putting you in a shower and taking you to a room." Biggins later apologised to Waissel, stating: "I am mortified by what's happened. I love Jewish people." She was evicted on Day 27, finishing in eighth place.

=== Other television appearances ===
Waissel made two appearances in Vanderpump Rules as herself in Series 4 Episode 1 at Scheana Shay's decade themed 30th birthday party, alongside Kristen Doute. Secondly in Episode 10, where it showed her in her real life role as an office manager of a tattoo removal company in Los Angeles.

On 4 July 2024, Waissel appeared in the audience in an episode of Question Time, where she asked a question about the UK's energy security following the Russian invasion of Ukraine.

== Personal life ==
Waissel is Jewish. Her mother, Diana (née Vogel), is the daughter of Sheila Vogel-Coupe. In July 2018, she gave birth to her first child, a boy named Hudson. In 2021, Waissel won a scholarship and completed the postgraduate law course at BPP University.

In January 2023, it was reported that she was trying to sue Syco Entertainment for breach of duty of care, and had founded the OWHL Foundation, a charity "overseeing welfare, human rights and liberty within the creative industry sector".

In July 2025, she joined policy college of Advance UK.

== Discography ==
=== Albums ===
Title	Album details
Katie Waissel	Released 17 March 2011; Label: Chamberlain Records; Formats: Digital download
Real Talk	Released: 16 August 2020; Label: 1830697 Records; Formats: Digital download

=== Extended plays ===
Title	Album details
Songs from Under the Covers	Released 30 November 2009; Label: KV Recordings; Formats: CD, digital download

=== Studio Singles ===
==== As featured performer ====
Title	Year	Peak chart positions			Album
Title	Year	UK	IRE	SCO	Album
"Heroes" (with The X Factor finalists)	2010	1	1	1	Non-album single

=== Guest appearances ===
Title	Year	Album
"I Don't Know Why" (River Gods feat. Katie Vogel)	2006	Chilled Winter Classics
"Moving Mountains" (The Private Life of David Reed feat. Lola Fontaine)^{[a]}	2010	The Private Life of David Reed

a "Moving Mountains" was later also included on Waissel's self-titled album, as "Katie Waissel feat. David Reed".

== Tours ==
- 2011: The X Factor Live Tour 2011

== See also ==
- List of The X Factor finalists (UK series 7)
