= Home Run (Misha B song) =

Single by Misha B
- Released: 13 July 2012
- Genre: Dancehall; R&B; grime; drum and bass
- Length: 3:20
- Label: Relentless Records
- Songwriters: Misha Bryan; Uzoechi Emenike
- Producers: Misha B; MNEK

Misha B singles chronology
"Wishing on a Star" (2011)	"Home Run" (2012)	"Do You Think of Me?" (2012)

"Home Run" is the debut single by British singer Misha B. It was officially released on 15 July 2012, and written and produced by Uzoechi Osisioma Emenike (MNEK) and Misha Bryan. The music video was released on 15 June 2012.

== Background ==
Home Run first appears briefly on Misha B's debut mixtape Why Hello World which was released for free download on 27 April. which became BBC Radio 1Xtra's mixtape of the week, the following week. The mixtape features a collection of original material including samples of original songs – "Big Dreaming", "Last Forever" and "Home Run" (plus covers of "Rolling in the Deep", "Mirror", "Unpretty", "Run the World", "Crew Love" and "Climax"). The mixtape received positive reviews and gained over 16,000 downloads and 25,000 streams.

On 2 May 2012, she announced that her debut official single would be "Home Run", a full version of the song was made available to stream via SoundCloud on 1 June 2012. The music video for the single which was directed by Rohan Blair-Mangat, premiered on 15 June. On 19 June she revealed the artwork for the single. The single was added to both BBC Radio One and BBC Radio 1Xtra playlists, as well as the video being on the MTV playlist.

The song was officially released on 15 July 2012 by Relentless Records and charted at No. 11, on the Official UK singles chart.

== Composition ==
"Home Run" was co-written and produced by British songwriter MNEK and Misha Bryan. According to Bryan, Home Run "is based on a ballad I wrote about my ex and I just changed it up to give it a fresh, fun vibe."

"Home Run is about that special someone who gets you so excited, so hyped that you lose control! When I perform it, I feel that same energy on stage – it makes you wanna dance," Misha explained.

4 Music described "It has a catchy hook combined with reggae-infused, drum and bass influenced beats, and this combined with Misha's powerful and soulful vocals has got us moving" . "The song starts off with a typical power ballad style, before quickly transitioning into a glitch drum and bass beat, perfectly complementing Misha B’s brazen, soulful vocal delivery" "Home Run" has been described as a fusion of multiple genres – "R&B, hip-hop, grime, dance, pop and soul", "chucking soul, R&B, grime and pop into the kitchen sink", "dancehall/soul-tinged" "funky dancehall".

== Critical reception ==
'Home Run' received mixed to generally positive reviews from critics. Flavour Magazine previewed the single and said "Combined with her soulful vocals, it brims over at its catchy hook to electric effect." Digital Spy rated the single 4 out of 5 stars, describing the "military drums and swirling sirens that plots somewhere between Nicki Minaj and Missy Elliott", as "fresh, exciting and best of all, unmistakably Misha." iMediamonkey praised the song: "Home Run is a promising offer and is one that is not lacking in personality, attitude and style... The track is a catchy one in which it showcases the star positively, not only demonstrating the fresh rap side of Misha B but the silky smooth diva-esque voice too." However, they also suggested the single was a bit rushed.

== Music video ==
=== Background and development ===
The music video which was directed by Rohan Blair-Mangat, was filmed in Middlesex on 31 May 2012. Ten cans of hairspray, 20 tins of neon paint, five red lipsticks, 75 sandwiches, 80 packets of crisps, 100 cups of tea, 40 bacon sandwiches, 45 cans of Coke and two pairs of curling tongs were needed for the shoot. The music video premiered on 15 June 2012 and was first released on YouTube, at a total length of three minutes and twenty-two seconds. "Rohan Blair-Mangat captures controversial X Factor finalist Misha B in full 'British Chaka' mode for the fierce, urban pop of Homerun, with some excellent facial designs and neon suits by Hattie Stewart."

=== Synopsis ===
The music video begins with Misha standing alone in silhouette form, showcasing her huge vocals against the acoustic piano, before suddenly breaking into uptempo beat. 4Music said "things really start to kick off when we see Misha rapping, singing and throwing some serious shapes in neon face paint". Soon she is accompanied by a group of energetic dancers and multi-coloured backgrounds. Various scenes from the second chorus onwards show Misha performing routines with her dancers in brightly coloured neon paint under UV lighting. During the bridge, she is seen up close against a light blue background with only her face and hair visible to the camera; whilst simultaneously, colourful patterns are being projected upon her face. The song ends with her silhouette shown walking away from the camera.

== Live performances ==
Misha B performed Home Run at both the nominations and awards ceremony for the MOBO 2012 Awards, where she received a Best Newcomer nomination. She also performed at the BBC 1Xtra Live 2012 concert at the Manchester Apollo and at her headline half-time performance of the American National Basketball Association (NBA) game between the Detroit Pistons and New York Knicks in London. On 25 June 2012, she performed an acoustic version of the song live for i-D magazine at Red Bull studios. On the day of 29 June 2012, she didn't perform the track, but appeared on CBBC's hit series Friday Download to promote it, taking part in the "Dance Download", "Music Download" (in which the music video for the track was shown) and "Star Download". On 11 July 2012, Bryan performed an acoustic rendition of it for SB.TV, receiving tens of thousands of views on YouTube. And on the day of release, she also appeared on T4 to promote the single. On 17 July 2012, she performed an acoustic version of the song for Ustream.

== Chart performance ==
The song was originally released on 15 July 2012 by Relentless Records and charted at No. 11, making it Bryan's first Top 20 hit. It went on to spend two more weeks in the Top 20, and further weeks in the Official UK Top 40. It spent a total of 5 weeks in the top 100.

== Track listing ==
- Digital remix EP
1. "Home Run" (Radio Edit) – 3:16
2. "Home Run" (Kat Krazy Remix) – 3:37
3. "Home Run" (Zed Bias Remix) – 4:04
4. "Home Run" (DC Breaks Remix) – 5:04
5. "Home Run" (Taiki & Nulight Remix) – 5:05

== Charts ==
Chart (2012)	Peak position
Ireland (IRMA)	46
Scotland Singles (OCC)	13
UK Singles (OCC)	11
UK Hip Hop/R&B (OCC)	2
UK Official Streaming Chart Top 100	87

== Release history ==
Country	Date	Format	Label
Ireland	13 July 2012	Digital download	Relentless Records
United Kingdom	15 July 2012	Digital download	Relentless Records
United Kingdom	31 May 2012	Radio impact	Relentless Records
