= Do You Think of Me? =

Single by Misha B
- Released: 4 November 2012
- Recorded: 2012
- Genre: Dance-pop; R&B; house
- Length: 3:50
- Label: Relentless
- Songwriters: Misha B, Ben Kohn, Tom Barnes, Pete Kelleher, Ayak Thiik
- Producer: TMS

Misha B singles chronology
"Home Run" (2012)	"Do You Think of Me?" (2012)	"Here's to Everything (Ooh La La)" (2013)

"Do You Think of Me?" is a song recorded by British recording artist Misha B, released as her second official single on 4 November 2012. In an interview Misha B stated that the song's concept was about "missing somebody who’s a loved one".

== Promotion and release ==
In August 2012, "Do You Think of Me?" was revealed as the name of the second single on Misha B's official Twitter. Before confirming the name, Misha set her fans a challenge to guess the name of the song by rearranging mixed-up words of the track to get the official title. On 14 September 2012, Misha unveiled the artwork for the single on her Twitter.

Misha B stated that she "really loved working on" the track and said that the record is "one of those songs where everyone will take away something different from it." She also revealed that she has "an emotional connection to the song – it has a very special meaning for me, which I hope comes across in the lyrics and the vocals".

== Live performances ==
On 1 August 2012, Misha performed the song for the first time at a gig in London. On 10 September 2012, she performed the single at the M.E.N. Diary Party along with her debut single "Home Run" and her reworked version of "Rolling in the Deep". In October 2012, she performed "Do You Think of Me?" for Trevor Nelson's 1Xtra Live Lounge and for The Xtra Factor Results Show on 18 November. Misha B performed an acoustic version for grammy.com. and MTV recorded her singing the song live at the Wireless Festival both August 2013

== Critical reception ==
"Do You Think of Me?" received generally positive reviews from music critics upon its release. According to 4music "Misha takes her powerhouse R&B vocals out into the open", they went on to call the single "a proper club banger, but unlike a lot of commercial pop and dance around right now, it's actually chock-full of real soul and raw emotion." The NME called it a "EDM-influenced mid-tempo ballad," comparative to Leona Lewis and Swedish DJ Avicii, where Misha B's "stupendous voice is left mostly intact, triumphantly storming the middle eight." KISS-FM depicted the song as an "Uptempo R&B track" which "shows of the vocalist’s soulful voice whilst still being the kind of tune you can dance to." Blues & Soul described it as a "soulfully-heartfelt and edgily-pounding" track. Digital Spy gave the song 5 stars out of 5, a "refreshing to hear an artist spill their guts over a stomping club-thumper rather than the usual dancefloor and DJ antics; the result is a euphoric urban paean that places Misha as one of the most exciting acts ever to have come out of a talent competition".

Holy Moly compared the song with Donna Summer's "I Feel Love" and Robin S's "Show Me Love"; while Jeremy Williams from So So Gay comparing the track to Vanessa Amorosi's "Absolutely Everybody" said that the track displays Misha's impressive vocals perfectly "Misha’s latest effort more than proves she has credible pop prowess." and "While not the most instant of this year’s post X Factor releases, it is easily the most impressive." Flavour Magazine acclaimed the song, stating that it "is a track that will have you bopping your head, clapping the beat, whilst skanking your shoulders". Thatgrapejuice.net described the song as a "delicious blend of Urban and Dance, 'Think of Me' – with its 90′s club-meets-tribal-flavour – taps into what’s "hot" without compromising Misha's soulful core." The backstagepass. biz felt that the second single was "like a total liberation for Misha; a real release of heart, soul and emotion." Also adding that; "while it will have you out of your seat and on the dance floor, it’s not your typical club banger. Opening humbly, its hidden depths are revealed as her exceptional vocals connect with instrumental rapture. Plunging even deeper as the dirty bass drops headfirst into the chorus."

== Music video ==
The official lyric video premiered via Misha's official Vevo on 14 September 2012. The official music video premiered on 8 October 2012 and sees Misha performing the track across a city skyline, while other scenes tell the story of parent-child relationships.

== Track listing ==
- Digital remix EP
1. "Do You Think of Me?" (Radio Edit) – 3:49
2. "Do You Think of Me?" (Benny Page Remix) – 4:12
3. "Do You Think of Me?" (Liam Keegan Remix)[Radio Edit] – 3:22
4. "Do You Think of Me?" (Jamie Grind Remix) – 3:48
5. "Do You Think of Me?" (featuring Cashtastic) (Pre-order only) – 3:54
- Limited CD single
1. "Do You Think of Me?" (Radio Edit) – 3:49
2. "Do You Think of Me?" (Liam Keegan Remix) – 3:22

== Charts ==
Chart (2012)	Peak position
Ireland (IRMA)	57
Scotland Singles (OCC)	11
Slovakia Airplay (ČNS IFPI)	55
UK Hip Hop/R&B (OCC)	1
UK Singles (OCC)	9

== Release history ==
Country	Date	Format	Label
Ireland	4 November 2012	Digital download	Relentless Records
United Kingdom	4 November 2012	Digital download	Relentless Records
United Kingdom	September 2012	Radio impact	Relentless Records
