= IMI International Top 20 Singles =

Song chart in India

The IMI International Top 20 Singles is a weekly record chart in India for international singles, published by the Indian Music Industry (IMI) and supported by the International Federation of the Phonographic Industry (IFPI). Launched on 21 June 2021, it is the first official music industry recognised record chart in India. The chart is reviewed by the IMI Charts committee, comprising representatives from Universal Music Group, Sony Music Entertainment, Times Music, and Warner Music Group. The chart is formulated by BMAT Music Innovators using streaming data from Amazon Music, Apple Music, and Spotify.

The weekly tracking period is from Friday to Thursday, with the chart published the following Monday. "Butter" by BTS was the first number-one song on the chart's inaugural issue dated 21 June 2021. The current number-one on the chart, as of the issue dated 17 August 2026, is "Loser" by Tame Impala.

== Number-one singles ==
| Issue date | Song | Artist(s) | Wks. | Ref. |
|---|---|---|---|---|
| 21 June 2021 | "Butter" | BTS | 4 | |
| 19 July 2021 | "Permission to Dance" | BTS | 5 | |
| 23 August 2021 | "Stay" | The Kid Laroi and Justin Bieber | 6 | |
| 4 October 2021 | "Love Nwantiti" (Remix) | CKay featuring Axel and DJ Yo | 14 | |
| 10 January 2022 | "Stay" | The Kid Laroi and Justin Bieber | 1 | |
| 17 January 2022 | "Heat Waves" | Glass Animals | 15 | |
| 2 May 2022 | "As It Was" | Harry Styles | 7 | |
| 20 June 2022 | "Yet to Come (The Most Beautiful Moment)" | BTS | 1 | |
| 27 June 2022 | "Heat Waves" | Glass Animals | 1 | |
| 4 July 2022 | "Left and Right" | Charlie Puth featuring Jungkook | 2 | |
| 18 July 2022 | "Heat Waves" | Glass Animals | 4 | |
| 15 August 2022 | "Dandelions" | Ruth B. | 1 | |
| 22 August 2022 | "Heat Waves" | Glass Animals | 1 | |
| 29 August 2022 | "Pink Venom" | Blackpink | 1 | |
| 5 September 2022 | "Dandelions" | Ruth B. | 2 | |
| 19 September 2022 | "Under the Influence" | Chris Brown | 7 | |
| 7 November 2022 | "Unholy" | Sam Smith and Kim Petras | 6 | |
| 19 December 2022 | "Until I Found You" | Stephen Sanchez and Em Beihold | 3 | |
| 9 January 2023 | "Calm Down" | Rema and Selena Gomez | 18 | |
| 22 May 2023 | "Cupid (Twin version)" | Fifty Fifty | 3 | |
| 12 June 2023 | "Calm Down" | Rema and Selena Gomez | 1 | |
| 19 June 2023 | "Take Two" | BTS | 1 | |
| 26 June 2023 | "Calm Down" | Rema and Selena Gomez | 4 | |
| 24 July 2023 | "Seven" | Jungkook featuring Latto | 8 | |
| 18 September 2023 | "Slow Dancing" | V | 3 | |
| 9 October 2023 | "3D" | Jungkook | 3 | |
| 30 October 2023 | "Lover" | Taylor Swift | 1 | |
| 6 November 2023 | "Hass Hass" | Diljit Dosanjh, Sia, and Greg Kurstin | 20 | |
| 25 March 2024 | "Fri(end)s" | V | 2 | |
| 8 April 2024 | "Hass Hass" | Diljit Dosanjh, Sia, and Greg Kurstin | 3 | |
| 29 April 2024 | "Fortnight" | Taylor Swift featuring Post Malone | 1 | |
| 6 May 2024 | "Hass Hass" | Diljit Dosanjh, Sia, and Greg Kurstin | 1 | |
| 13 May 2024 | "Espresso" | Sabrina Carpenter | 1 | |
| 21 May 2024 | "Come Back to Me" | RM | 1 | |
| 27 May 2024 | "Espresso" | Sabrina Carpenter | 9 | |
| 29 July 2024 | "Who" | Jimin | 2 | |
| 12 August 2024 | "Big Dawgs" | Hanumankind and Kalmi | 8 | |
| 7 October 2024 | "Timeless" | The Weeknd and Playboi Carti | 1 | |
| 14 October 2024 | "Big Dawgs" | Hanumankind and Kalmi | 2 | |
| 28 October 2024 | "APT." | Rosé and Bruno Mars | 4 | |
| 25 November 2024 | "Running Wild" | Jin | 1 | |
| 2 December 2024 | "APT." | Rosé and Bruno Mars | 1 | |
| 9 December 2024 | "Die with a Smile" | Lady Gaga and Bruno Mars | 25 | |
| 2 June 2025 | "Don't Say You Love Me" | Jin | 1 | |
| 9 June 2025 | "Die with a Smile" | Lady Gaga and Bruno Mars | 1 | |
| 16 June 2025 | "Sapphire" | Ed Sheeran | 17 | |
| 13 October 2025 | "The Fate of Ophelia" | Taylor Swift | 2 | |
| 27 October 2025 | "Sapphire" | Ed Sheeran | 1 | |
| 3 November 2025 | "Spaghetti" | Le Sserafim featuring J-Hope | 1 | |
| 10 November 2025 | "The Fate of Ophelia" | Taylor Swift | 1 | |
| 17 November 2025 | "Die with a Smile" | Lady Gaga and Bruno Mars | 2 | |
| 1 December 2025 | "No Batidão" | Zxkai | 2 | |
| 15 December 2025 | "Fa9la" | Flipperachi | 11 | |
| 3 March 2026 | "No Batidão" | Zxkai | 2 | |
| 16 March 2026 | "Fa9la" | Flipperachi | 1 | |
| 23 March 2026 | "No Batidão" | Zxkai | 1 | |
| 30 March 2026 | "Swim" | BTS | 12 | |
| 22 June 2026 | "Come Over" | BTS | 1 | |
| 29 June 2026 | "Swim" | BTS | 4 | |
| 27 July 2026 | "Dai Dai" | Shakira and Burna Boy | 1 | |
| 3 August 2026 | "Freaked Out" | Fat Papi and Prodshushy | 1 | |
| 10 August 2026 | "Loser" | Tame Impala | 2 | |
