= Gracie Gold =

American figure skater (born 1995)

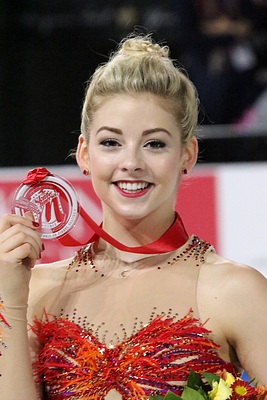
- Gracie Gold at the 2015 Skate America

Personal information
- Full name: Grace Elizabeth Gold
- Born: August 17, 1995 (age 31) Newton, Massachusetts, U.S.
- Home town: Wilmington, Delaware, U.S.
- Height: 5 ft 6 in (1.68 m)

Figure skating career
- Country: United States
- Discipline: Women's singles
- Coach: Alex Zahradnicek; Pavel Filchenkov
- Skating club: IceWorks Skating Club, Aston
- Began skating: 2003
- Highest WS: 6th (2014–15 & 2015–16)

Medal record
Olympic Games
Bronze medal – third place	2014 Sochi	Team
U.S. Championships
Gold medal – first place	2014 Boston	Singles
Gold medal – first place	2016 Saint Paul	Singles
Silver medal – second place	2013 Omaha	Singles
Silver medal – second place	2015 Greensboro	Singles
World Team Trophy
Gold medal – first place	2013 Tokyo	Team
Gold medal – first place	2015 Tokyo	Team
Silver medal – second place	2012 Tokyo	Team
World Junior Championships
Silver medal – second place	2012 Minsk	Singles

Grace Elizabeth Gold (born August 17, 1995) is an American figure skater. She is a 2014 Olympic bronze medalist in the team event, a six-time Grand Prix medalist (2 gold, 2 silver, 2 bronze), and a two-time U.S. national champion (2014, 2016). She placed 4th at the 2014 Winter Olympics in Sochi, Russia. At the junior level, Gold is the 2012 World Junior silver medalist, the 2011 JGP Estonia champion, and the 2012 U.S. junior national champion.

In 2014, Gold became the first American woman to win the NHK Trophy title on the Grand Prix Series circuit and holds the record for the highest short program score ever recorded by an American woman (76.43) which she achieved at the 2016 World Championships in Boston. She is a mental health advocate and was recognized with the 2022 Bell of Hope Award. She was featured in the HBO sports documentary The Weight of Gold (2020), and her memoir Outofshapeworthlessloser: A Memoir of Figure Skating, F*cking Up, and Figuring It Out released in February 2024, was on the New York Times Bestseller list.

== Personal life ==
Grace Elizabeth Gold was born on August 17, 1995, in Newton, Massachusetts. She is the daughter of Denise, an ER nurse, and Carl Gold, an anesthesiologist. Gracie's fraternal twin sister, Carly Gold (named after their father), is younger by 40 minutes and also competed in figure skating.

Gold grew up in Springfield, Missouri before she and her family moved to Springfield, Illinois. She said that she has lived in Corpus Christi, Texas. She attended ninth grade at Glenwood High School in Chatham, Illinois, before switching to online education through the University of Missouri. She has taken ballet lessons to improve her performance in skating.

Gold has been open about her mental health struggles, including her treatment for anxiety, depression, and an eating disorder. She discussed having suicidal thoughts after moving alone to Michigan in 2017 and isolating herself in her apartment. She said that she slept for as long as 24 hours at a time and then stayed up for the next 3 nights (as well as days). Her electric bill was once less than $20 for a month because she had all the lights turned off so often. Teammate Ashley Wagner first prompted U.S. Figure Skating officials to seek treatment for Gold in 2016, but Gold did not accept their help until she snapped in front of judges at the USFSA event in 2017. After returning to skating, she redefined her goals and aimed to find a healthier approach to the sport. Reflecting on her journey, Gold told reporters in December 2019: "Yes, things could be better, but look how far I've come." She was featured in The Weight of Gold (2020), an HBO Sports Documentary which explores "the mental health challenges that Olympic athletes often face."

In her memoir, Outofshapeworthlessloser: A Memoir of Figure Skating, F*cking Up, and Figuring It Out, Gold alleged that she was raped by a fellow figure skater at an event after-party when she was twenty-one years old. She said that she had reported the incident to a U.S. Figure Skating official, who passed this on to the U.S. Center for SafeSport. However, she didn't hear anything from the organization until two years later only to be informed that her case was being looked at by different case manager. Eight years after the incident and three months after the release of Gold's memoir, SafeSport released a ruling on Gold's case, permanently banning the skater that had allegedly assaulted her from participating in any future U.S. Figure Skating event. The public ruling revealed that the man Gold accused of sexual assault was Australian figure skater Brendan Kerry.

She also came out as bisexual in her memoir, having dated both men and women. She said that during her days of competitive figure skating, her agent told her to hide her sexuality, believing that her coming out would be detrimental to her career.

Gold briefly dated British ice dancer, James Hernandez. She also had a brief relationship with former Canadian men's singles skater Nam Nguyen.

== Career ==
Gold started skating at age 8 after attending a friend's birthday party at her local rink in Springfield, Missouri. She then began training with Amy Vorhaben and Max Liu before changing coaches to work with Alexia Griffin. Later she picked Susan Liss to coach her and then switched to Toni Hickey in Springfield, Illinois. Alex Ouriashev was her next coach; he worked with her at two rinks in the Chicago area.

Gold competed in pairs with Sean Hickey. They placed eighth in juvenile pairs at the 2007 U.S. Junior Championships. She was fourth on the novice level at the 2010 U.S. Championships. The next season she competed on the junior level but finished sixth at the Midwestern Sectionals and failed to qualify for the national championships. After the event she began preparing for the upcoming season by working to increase the technical .

=== 2011–12 season: International debut and World Junior Silver Medalist ===
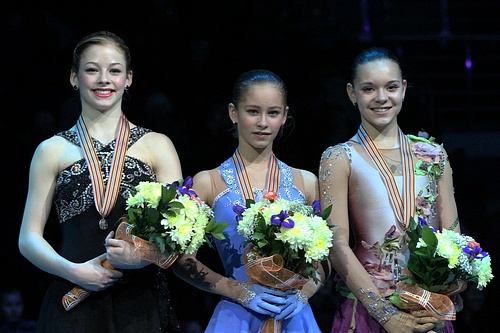
Gold (left) won the silver medal at the 2012 Junior World Championships

Gold made her international debut at the Junior Grand Prix in Tallinn, Estonia, winning gold. She qualified for the 2012 U.S. Championships at the junior level, where she won both the short and long programs to win the gold medal. She scored 178.92 points, a record for a junior in the women's U.S. Championships. She won gold in all seven of her competitions for the season leading into the U.S. Championships. She competed at the 2012 World Junior Championships in Minsk, Belarus. Gold won the silver medal at the event. She signed with IMG (International Management Group).

Gold was named to the U.S. team for the 2012 World Team Trophy. At her senior international debut, she finished fifth overall behind fellow Junior Worlds medalist Adelina Sotnikova. Team USA finished second overall.

=== 2012–13 season: Senior debut ===
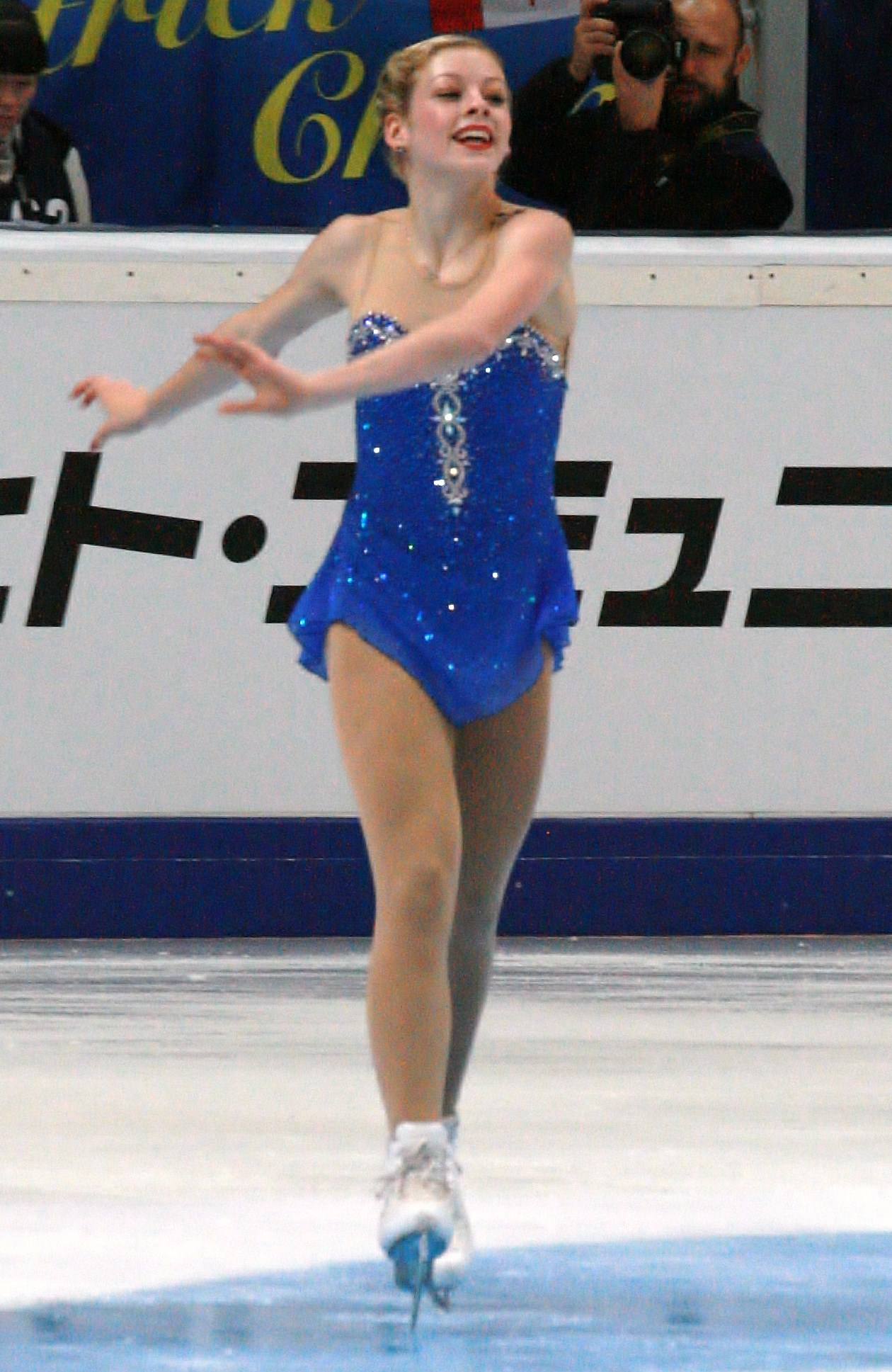
Gracie Gold skates her free program at the 2012 Rostelecom Cup

Gold finished seventh in her senior Grand Prix debut at the 2012 Skate Canada. She then worked with a sports psychologist on her focus and refined her programs in Canton, Michigan. At her second event, the 2012 Rostelecom Cup, she won the silver medal. At her first senior U.S. Nationals, she placed ninth in the short program and first in the free skate, winning the silver medal overall with a score of 186.57 points. She was named to compete at the 2013 Four Continents, where she finished sixth. At the 2013 World Championships, she placed ninth in the short program, fifth in the free skate, and sixth overall setting a new personal best total score of 184.25 points. Gold's sixth-place finish along with teammate Ashley Wagner's fifth-place finish secured three spots for the U.S. women at the 2014 Winter Olympics.

At the 2013 World Team Trophy in Tokyo, Gold placed third in the short program and third in the free skate to finish third overall, setting a personal and season best score total of 188.03 points. Team USA won the team gold for the second time since 2009. In July 2013, Gold became a Pandora Jewelry ambassador.

=== 2013–14 season: First national title & Olympic medal ===
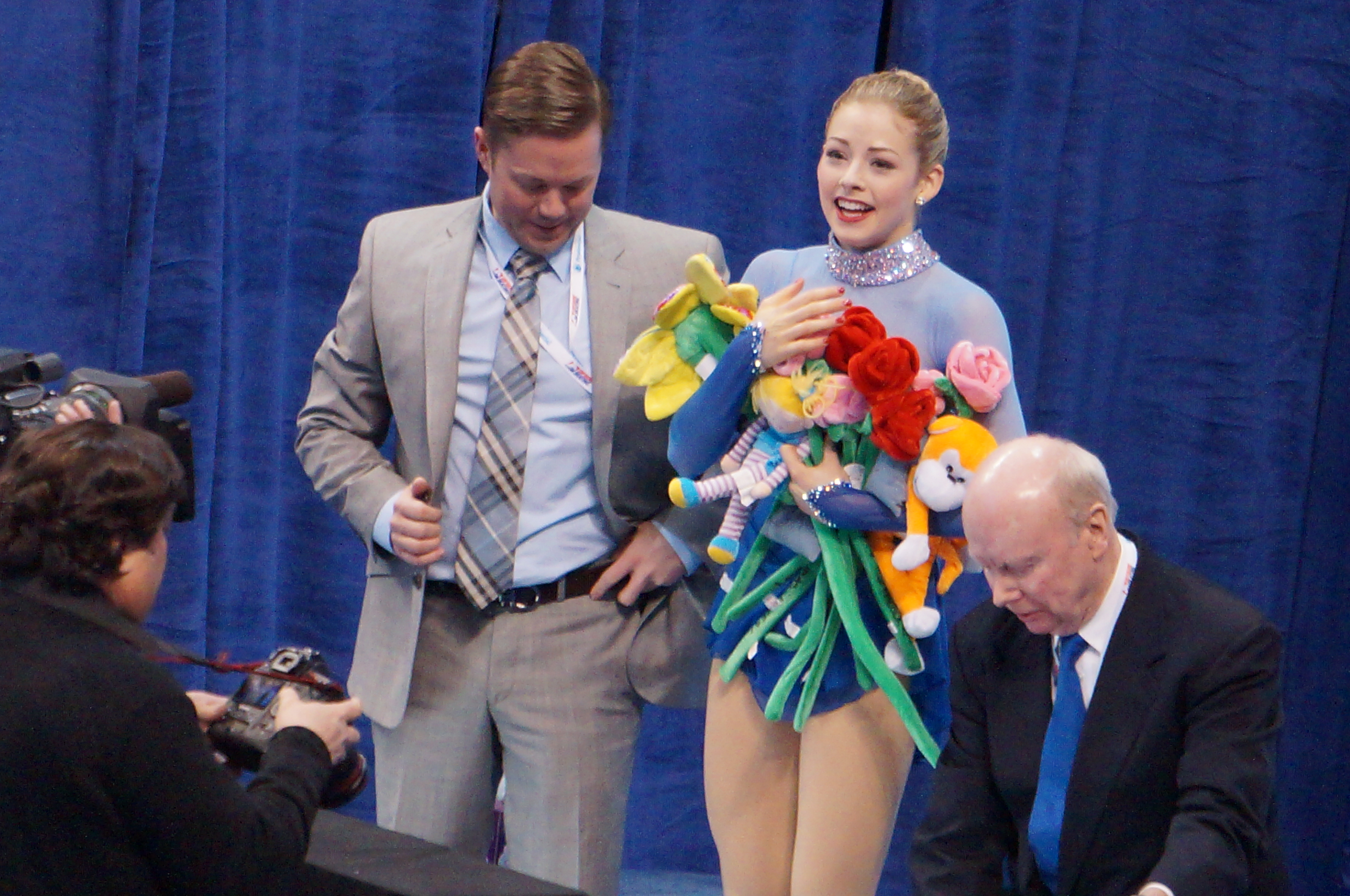
Gold at the 2014 US Championships

After parting ways with coach Alex Ourashiev in late August 2013, Gold trained with Marina Zoueva and Oleg Epstein in Canton, Michigan, while searching for a new permanent coach. She took silver at her first event of the season, the U.S. International Figure Skating Classic. After the event she traveled to El Segundo, California for a week-long tryout with Frank Carroll at the Toyota Sports Center. On September 25, 2013, it was announced that Carroll would be her permanent coach.

During the 2013–14 ISU Grand Prix series, Gold competed at 2013 Skate Canada, placing first in the short program with a personal best of 69.45 and third in the free skate, winning the bronze medal overall. At the 2013 NHK Trophy she finished fourth. She was the third alternate for the Grand Prix Final.

At the 2014 U.S. Championships, Gold placed first in the short program with 72.12 points, the highest-ever ladies' score earned at the U.S. Championships under the ISU Judging System. She won the free skate with another record score of 139.57, securing her first senior national title. She was named to the U.S. team for the 2014 Winter Olympics in Sochi, Russia. She won a bronze medal in the Olympic team event and controversially finished fourth and off the podium in the ladies singles event with a score of 205.53 points. Gold was assigned to the 2014 World Championships in Saitama, Japan where she placed fifth overall. At the end of the season, she performed with Stars on Ice.

=== 2014–15 season: NHK Trophy title ===
Gold began her season at the 2014 Nebelhorn Trophy, an ISU Challenger Series event, winning the bronze medal behind Russians Elizaveta Tuktamysheva and Alena Leonova. For the 2014–15 ISU Grand Prix season, Gold was assigned 2014 Skate America and the 2014 NHK Trophy.

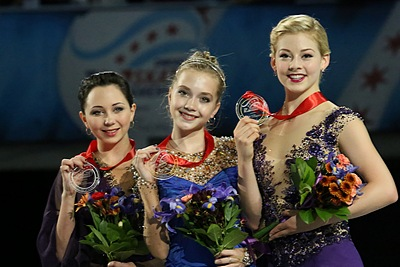
Elizaveta Tuktamysheva, Elena Radionova, and Gold (left to right) during the medal ceremony at Skate America 2014

Gold won bronze at Skate America and gold at the NHK Trophy, the latter marking her first win at a Grand Prix event, and the first time an American woman won the event. She qualified for her first Grand Prix Final, but withdrew on December 4, 2014 due to a stress fracture in her left foot. She won a silver medal at the 2015 U.S. Championships with a score of 205.54 after finishing second in both the short program and free skate. At the 2015 Four Continents Championships, Gold placed second in the short program with a score of 62.67 but fifth in the free skate with a score of 113.91, finishing fourth overall with a score of 176.58. At the 2015 World Championships, she placed eighth place in the short program with a score of 60.73, her lowest score of the season. She came back in the free skate with a score of 128.23, which was her season's best and the second highest free skate score of the ladies event. She finished fourth overall, her highest placement at a World Championship so far. She competed on Team USA at the 2015 World Team Trophy. She placed first in the short program with a score of 71.26, the highest score ever recorded for an American woman in an ISU event. However, she placed fifth in the free skate. Overall Team USA placed first.

=== 2015–16 season: Second national title ===
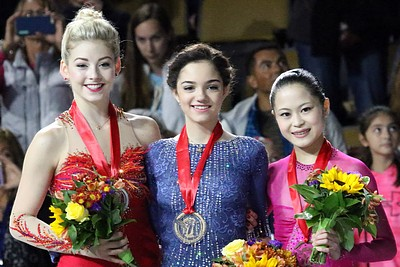
Gold (left) on the podium at 2015 Skate America, with Evgenia Medvedeva (center) and Satoko Miyahara (right)

Gold's 2015–16 Grand Prix Series assignments were 2015 Skate America and the 2015 Trophée Éric Bompard. She won the silver medal at Skate America, behind Russia's Evgenia Medvedeva. She continued her season placing first in the short program at Trophée Éric Bompard, with a score of 73.32.

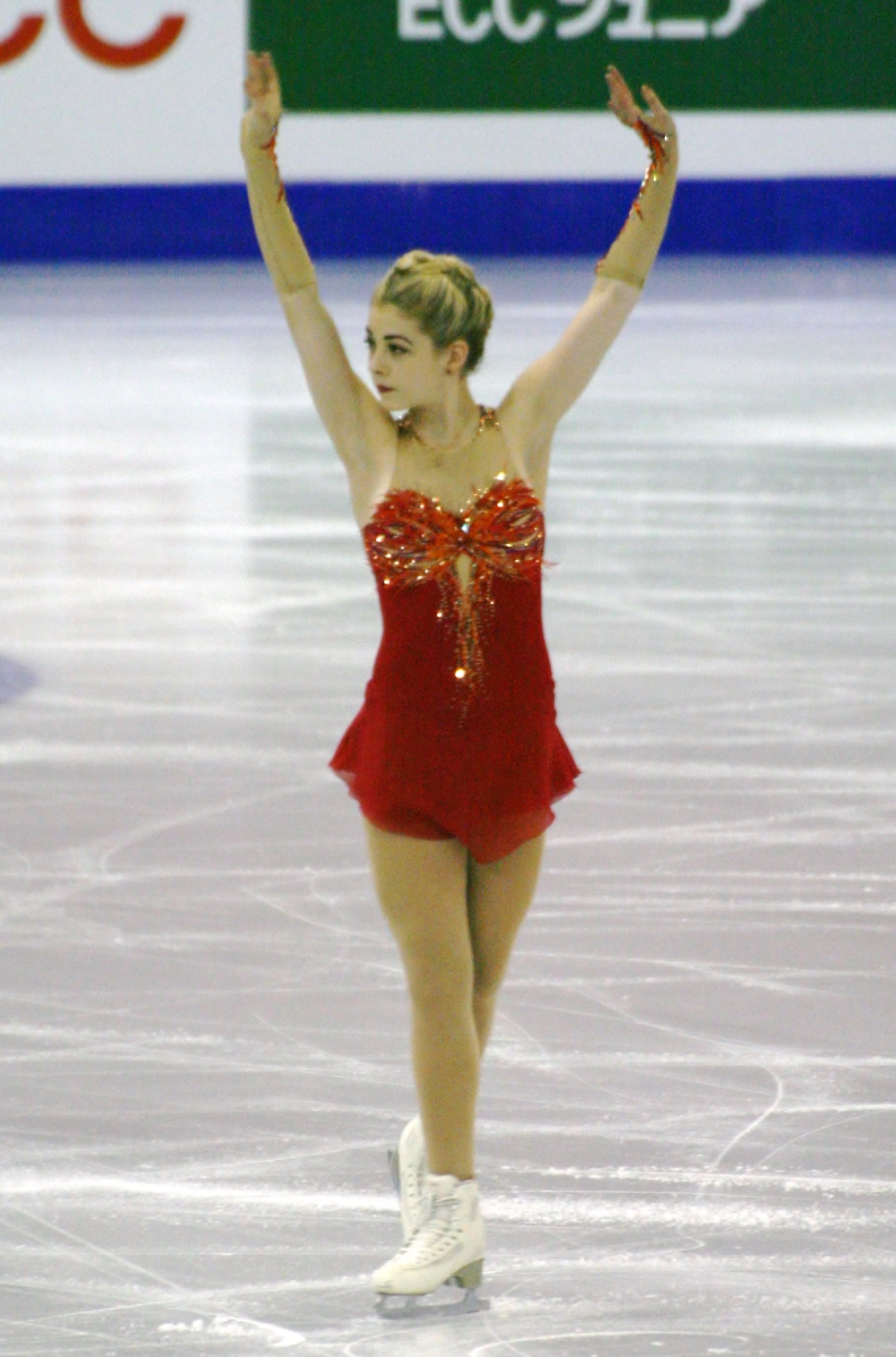
Gold performing her free skate at the 2015 GPF

The event was canceled on November 14 due to a state of emergency in France after the November 2015 Paris attacks. On November 23, the ISU announced that the short program standings would stand as final placements securing Gold a spot in the 2015 Grand Prix Final, where she placed 5th in both the short and free programs, ranking 5th overall.

On January 23, Gold earned her second National title at the 2016 U.S. Championships in Saint Paul. After regaining her national crown she placed fifth at the 2016 Four Continents Championships in Taipei, Taiwan. She then competed at the 2016 World Championships in Boston where she placed first in the short program with a score of 76.43, the highest short program score ever recorded by an American woman. Placing sixth in the free program, she dropped to fourth place overall. Finishing the season, Gold competed at the inaugural 2016 KOSÉ Team Challenge Cup, helping Team North America win the gold medal.

=== 2016–17 season: Personal struggles ===
Gold was assigned to two Grand Prix events, 2016 Skate America and the 2016 Trophée de France. She began her season at the 2016 Japan Open. In the free skate, she earned a score of 108.24 and helped Team North America win the bronze medal. At 2016 Skate America, she placed third in the short program with a score of 64.87 behind American Ashley Wagner and Japan's Mai Mihara after a fall on her triple flip. Gold struggled in the free skate, suffering multiple falls and dropped to 5th overall with a total score of 184.22. She cited "post worlds summer depression" as a reason for not being prepared, commenting she had only recently "felt like herself again". Her struggles continued at the Tropheé de France; she scored a combined total of 165.89 for 8th place, the worst Grand Prix finish of her career.

In late December 2016, Gold resumed her collaboration with her former coach, Alex Ouriashev, training with him in Chicago before returning to Los Angeles, where she was coached by Frank Carroll. She finished 6th at the 2017 U.S. Championships, and was left off the Four Continents and World Championship teams for the first time in her senior career; she had previously been on every world championship team beginning in 2013. Carroll announced after the event that they would part company. He didn't inform Gold before telling the media, causing major backlash on social media. However, Gold still said that despite being surprised about Carroll's decision to tell the media before informing her, she maintained the "upmost respect for Frank" and would take the time to make the right decision on coaching arrangements heading into the Olympic season.

On February 8, 2017, Gold announced that Marina Zoueva and Oleg Epstein would be her trainers (Epstein is also a choreographer) at the Arctic Edge ice rink in Canton. According to Lindsay Crouse, a writer with The New York Times, Nike had a pattern of pushing the young women it sponsored to lose excessive amounts of weight. She wrote that pressure from Nike's coaches helped to trigger Gold to show disordered eating so profound that she considered taking her own life.

=== 2017–18 season ===
Gold withdrew from the 2017 Japan Open, set to be her season opening and also withdrew from the 2017 CS Ondrej Nepela Trophy for personal reasons. Gold had been assigned to two Grand Prix events, the 2017 Cup of China and the 2017 Internationaux de France, both of which she withdrew from in October due to ongoing treatment for anxiety, depression, and an eating disorder. Gold later withdrew from U.S. nationals saying that she would not have proper training beforehand. At the end of the season, it was reported that Gold was hired as a coach in Arizona.

=== 2018–19 season: Comeback ===
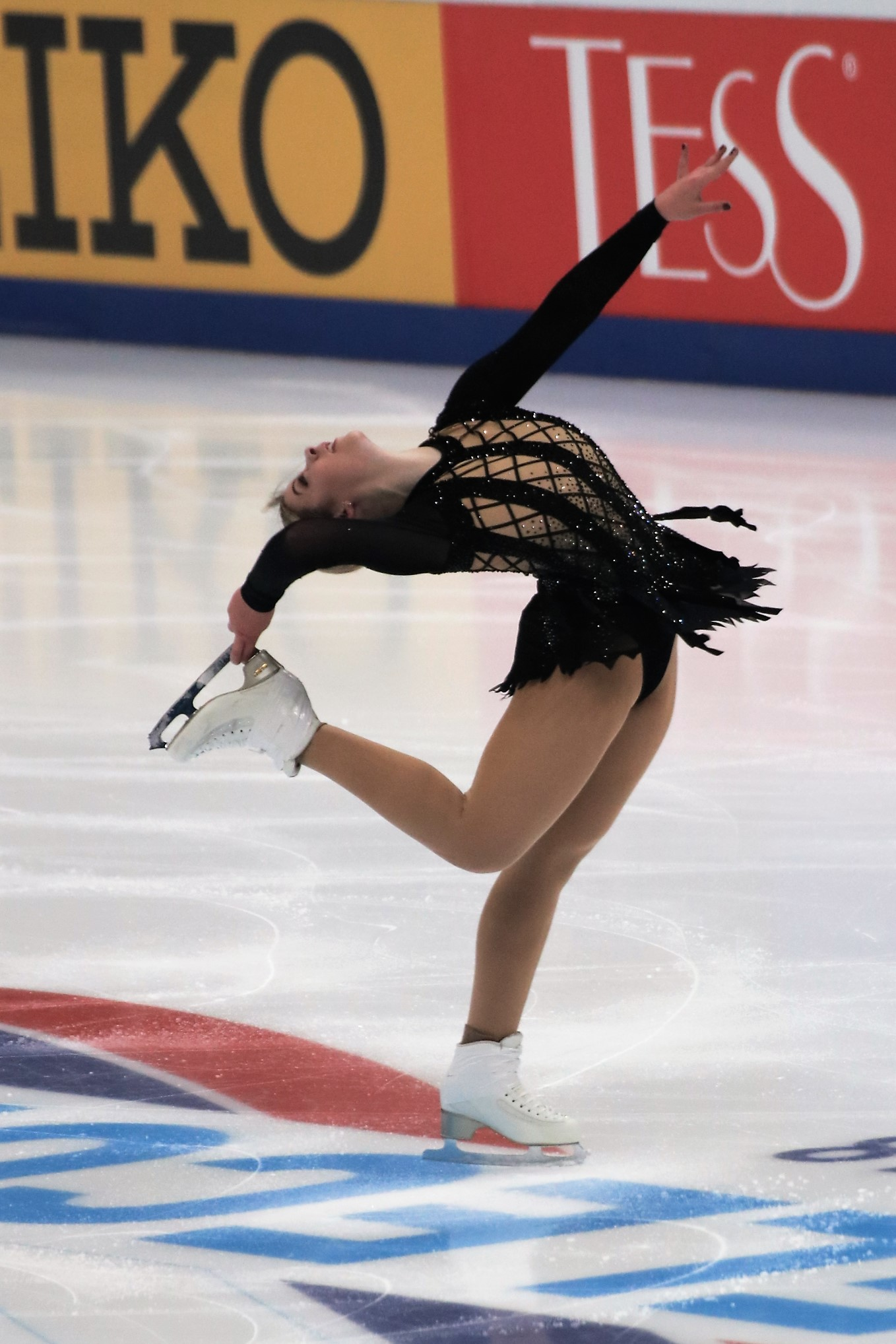
Gracie Gold at the 2018 Rostelecom Cup

After rumors that she would be returning to the sport, it was announced on June 28, 2018 that Gold was assigned to compete at the 2018 Rostelecom Cup. Her coach was Vincent Restencourt based at IceWorks in Aston, Pennsylvania southwest of Philadelphia. Former figure skater Jeremy Abbott choreographed her short and long programs. It was said that Gold's new short program portrayed a more playful and sexy character and her free program showed her journey from her personal struggles to her comeback. At the 2018 Rostelecom Cup, in the short program, she doubled the triple Lutz-triple toe loop combination, under-rotated, and fell on her triple flip. She also popped her planned double Axel. She scored 37.51, the lowest short program score that she has ever received since the start of her junior career, placing her in 10th and last place. Gold announced her withdrawal from the free skate via Twitter saying it would benefit her mental health to leave because of her failure in the short program. She later said that she was planning to compete in the 2019 US Championships; however on January 9, 2019, she announced her withdrawal from nationals in order to further prepare for the 2019–2020 season. She said she was working towards the 2022 Winter Olympics in Beijing. Videos taken by her coach posted on Instagram showed that she had begun practicing jumps without the harness and was successfully landing them.

=== 2019–2020 season ===
Being ineligible for a spot at a Grand Prix event, Gold competed at domestic regional competitions in an attempt to earn a spot at the 2020 U.S. Championships. Restencourt began posting promising videos of Gold attempting triple Axels and quadruple salchows in harness on his Instagram, as well as all of her triple jumps. At the 2020 U.S. South Atlantic Regional Atlantic Championships, Gold placed third in the short program and fourth in the free program after making significant errors in both programs. However she placed third overall and advanced to the 2020 Eastern Sectional Championships, where she won the bronze medal. That earned her a qualifying spot for the 2020 U.S. Championships. She placed twelfth at the national championships.

=== 2020–2021 season ===
Gold was named to U.S. Figure Skating's international selection pool, meaning that she was eligible to compete at international events in the 2020–2021 figure skating season and would be considered for assignment to such events. She was assigned to compete at 2020 Skate America. The ISU decided to run the 2020-2021 Grand Prix based mainly on where skaters training locations were to limit international travel during the coronavirus pandemic. She finished twelfth. Gold placed thirteenth at the 2021 U.S. Championships.

=== 2021–2022 season ===
Gold was sixth in the short program at the 2022 U.S. Championships, but dropped to tenth place overall after the free skate.

=== 2022–2023 season ===
Approaching the new season, Gold said that "I really want to transition from the 'good for her for being out there' mentality... to, 'Oh, she's really, really good... she's really competitive.'" She won the bronze medal at the Philadelphia Summer International, in the process becoming the oldest female skater to land a triple Lutz-triple toe loop combination in international competition, at age 27. Gold was twelfth at the 2022 CS Nebelhorn Trophy, and placed sixth at 2022 Skate America. At the 2023 U.S. Figure Skating Championships, Gold again landed a triple Lutz-triple toe loop combination in her short program and placed 5th. She was 11th in the free skate to place 8th overall, her best result since 2017.

== Endorsements ==
In October 2013, Gold was named as a face of CoverGirl. She appeared on the cover of Sports Illustrated's February 2014 issue, GQ Japan, and Teen Vogue. Later, she was named the 2014 Sportswoman of the Year by the Los Angeles Council, and received an award in March 2014 during the L.A. Sports ceremony. She is an ambassador for KOSÉ Infinity, a beauty product.

Gold is sponsored by John Wilson, her blade manufacturer, Pattern-99 (she is the brand ambassador); Edea, her skating boot manufacturer; Visa; United Airlines; Procter & Gamble; Red Bull; and Nike.

== Programs ==
Competition and exhibition programs by season
Season	Short program	Free skate program	Exhibition program
2009–10	The Firebird: Composed by Igor Stravinsky	Music from Romeo and Juliet: Composed by Nino Rota	—N/a
2010–11	Tango de los Exilados: Composed by Walter Taieb; Performed by Vanessa-Mae	Ennio Morricone Medley: 1. The Mission; 2. The Untouchables; Composed by Ennio Morricone	—N/a
2011–12	Dance of The Sugar Plum Fairy: From The Nutcracker; Composed by Pyotr Ilyich Tchaikovsky; Performed by The Deviations Project	Ennio Morricone Medley	"The Show: By Lenka
2012–13	"Hernando's Hideaway": From The Pajama Game; Composed by Jerry Ross; Choreo. by Scott Brown	Life Is Beautiful: Composed by Nicola Piovani; Choreo. by Scott Brown	"The Show"
2012–13	"Hernando's Hideaway": From The Pajama Game; Composed by Jerry Ross; Choreo. by Scott Brown	Life Is Beautiful: Composed by Nicola Piovani; Choreo. by Scott Brown	"Girl on Fire": By Alicia Keys
2013–14	Three Preludes: Composed by George Gershwin; Choreo. by Marina Zoueva and Oleg Epstein	The Sleeping Beauty: Composed by Pyotr Ilyich Tchaikovsky; Choreo. by Marina Zoueva and Oleg Epstein	"All That Jazz": From Chicago
2013–14	Adagio: From Piano Concerto in A minor; Composed by Edvard Grieg; Choreo. by Lori Nichol	The Sleeping Beauty	"All That Jazz"
2014–15	Adagio (from Piano Concerto in A minor)	The Phantom of the Opera: Composed by Andrew Lloyd Webber; Choreo. by Lori Nichol; Tracks used: 1. "Phantasia"; 2. "Wishing You Were Somehow Here Again"	"Let It Go": From Frozen; Performed by Idina Menzel
2014–15	Adagio (from Piano Concerto in A minor)	The Phantom of the Opera: Composed by Andrew Lloyd Webber; Choreo. by Lori Nichol; Tracks used: 1. "Phantasia"; 2. "Wishing You Were Somehow Here Again"	"Shake It Off": By Taylor Swift
2014–15	Adagio (from Piano Concerto in A minor)	The Phantom of the Opera: Composed by Andrew Lloyd Webber; Choreo. by Lori Nichol; Tracks used: 1. "Phantasia"; 2. "Wishing You Were Somehow Here Again"	"I Was Here": By Beyoncé
2015–16	"El Choclo": Composed by Ángel Villoldo; Performed by The Cello Project; Choreo. by Lori Nichol	The Firebird: Composed by Igor Stravinsky; Choreo. by Lori Nichol	"I Was Here"
2015–16	"El Choclo": Composed by Ángel Villoldo; Performed by The Cello Project; Choreo. by Lori Nichol	The Firebird: Composed by Igor Stravinsky; Choreo. by Lori Nichol	"Maybe This Time": Performed by Lea Michele and Kristin Chenoweth
2016–17	"Assassin's Tango": From Mr. & Mrs. Smith; Composed by John Powell; Choreo. by Lori Nichol	Daphnis et Chloé: Composed by Maurice Ravel; Choreo. by Lori Nichol	Medley: 1. "Best Mistake"; Performed by Ariana Grande feat. Big Sean; 2. "Bang Bang"; Performed by Jessie J, Nicki Minaj, and Ariana Grande; Choreo. by Misha Ge
2016–17	"Assassin's Tango": From Mr. & Mrs. Smith; Composed by John Powell; Choreo. by Lori Nichol	Daphnis et Chloé: Composed by Maurice Ravel; Choreo. by Lori Nichol	"Golden": Performed by Ruth B.
2017–18	"People": From Funny Girl; Performed by Barbra Streisand; Choreo. by Marina Zoueva	La Bayadère: Composed by Ludwig Minkus; Choreo. by Marina Zoueva	—N/a
2018–19	"I Put a Spell on You": Performed by Annie Lennox; Choreo. by Jeremy Abbott	"She Used to Be Mine": From Waitress; Performed by Sara Bareilles; Choreo. by Jeremy Abbott	—N/a
2019–20	"I Put a Spell on You"	"She Used to Be Mine"	—N/a
2020-21	"Survivor": By Destiny's Child; Performed by 2WEI; Choreo. by Jeremy Abbott	"War in My Mind": Performed by Beth Hart; Choreo. by Jeremy Abbott	—N/a
2021–22	East of Eden Soundtrack: Composed by Lee Holdridge; Choreo. by Jeremy Abbott	Daphnis et Chloé: Composed by Maurice Ravel; Choreo. by Jeremy Abbott	—N/a
2022–23	East of Eden Soundtrack	Rachmaninoff Medley: 1. Rhapsody on a Theme of Paganini; 2. "Piano Concerto No. 2"; Composed by Sergei Rachmaninoff; Choreo. by Jeremy Abbott and Michael Solonoski	"Uphill Battle": Performed by Rozzi

== Competitive highlights ==
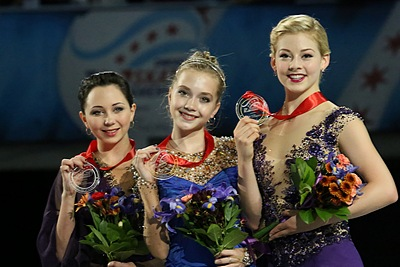
Gracie Gold (right) at the 2014 Skate America podium

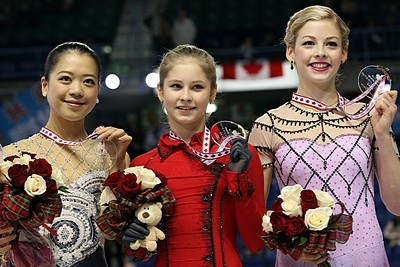
Gracie Gold (right) at the 2013 Skate Canada podium

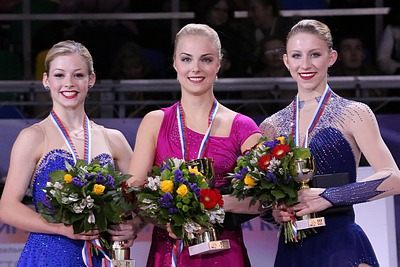
Gracie Gold (left) at the 2012 Rostelecom Cup podium

- GP – Event of the ISU Grand Prix Series
- JGP – Event of the ISU Junior Grand Prix Series
- CS – Event of the ISU Challenger Series
- WD – Withdrew from competition
- Medals at team events are awarded for the team results only. Individual placements at team events are listed in parentheses.

Competition placements at senior level
Season	2011–12	2012–13	2013–14	2014–15	2015–16	2016–17	2018–19	2019–20	2020–21	2021–22	2022–23
Winter Olympics			4th								
Winter Olympics (Team event)			3rd								
World Championships		6th	5th	4th	4th						
Four Continents Championships		6th		4th	5th						
Grand Prix Final					5th						
U.S. Championships		2nd	1st	2nd	1st	6th		12th	13th	10th	8th
World Team Trophy	2nd (5th)	1st (3rd)		1st (3rd)							
GP NHK Trophy			4th	1st							
GP Rostelecom Cup		2nd					WD				
GP Skate America				3rd	2nd	5th			12th		6th
GP Skate Canada		7th	3rd								
GP Trophée de France					1st	8th					
CS Golden Spin of Zagreb						6th					
CS Ice Challenge											9th
CS Nebelhorn Trophy				3rd							12th
Cranberry Cup										13th	
Japan Open					2nd	3rd					
Philadelphia Summer											3rd
Team Challenge Cup					1st (4th)						
U.S. Classic		2nd	2nd								

Competition placements at junior level
Season	2011–12
World Junior Championships	2nd
U.S. Championships	1st
JGP Estonia	1st

== Detailed results ==
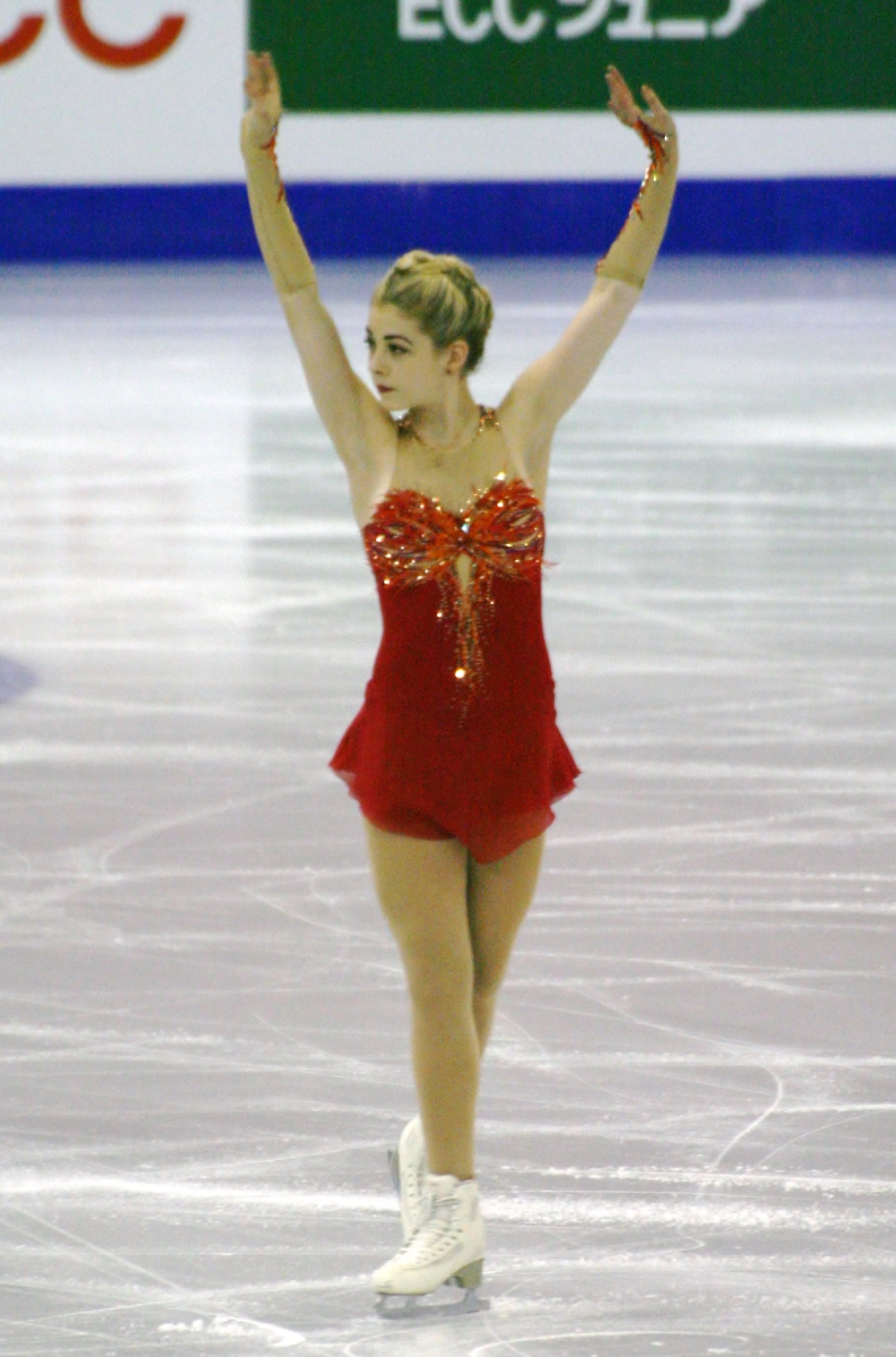
Gold at the 2015–16 Grand Prix Final

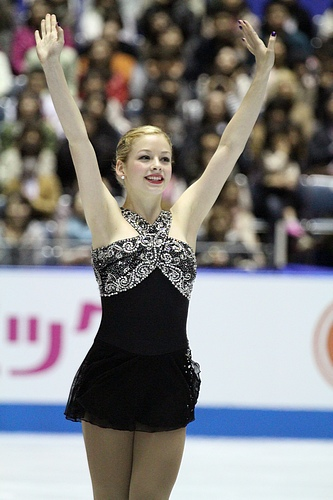
Gold at the 2012 World Team Trophy

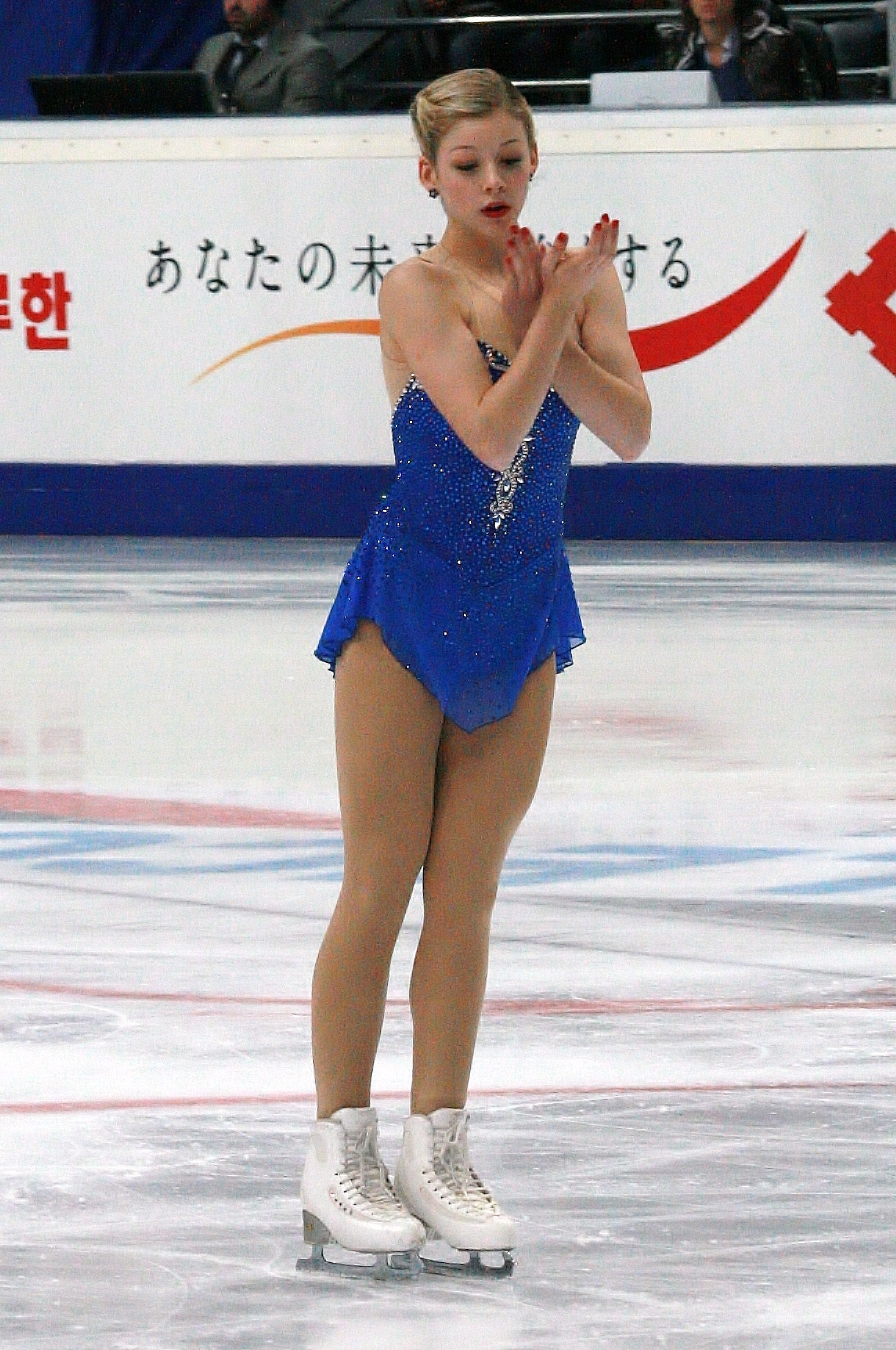
Gold at the 2012 Rostelecom Cup

- Small medals for the short program and free skating are only awarded at ISU Championships.
- At national events in the United States, pewter medals are awarded for fourth place.
- Medals at team events are awarded for the team results only. Individual placements at team events are listed in parentheses.

=== Senior level ===
Results in the 2011–12 season
Date	Event	SP		FS		Total	
Date	Event	P	Score	P	Score	P	Score
Apr 18–22, 2012	(Japan) 2012 World Team Trophy	4	59.07	5	110.58	2 (5)	169.65

Results in the 2012–13 season
Date	Event	SP		FS		Total	
Date	Event	P	Score	P	Score	P	Score
Sep 12–16, 2012	(United States) 2012 U.S. International Classic	2	59.37	1	111.78	2	171.15
Oct 26–28, 2012	2012 Skate Canada International	9	52.19	6	99.38	7	151.57
Nov 9–11, 2012	(Russia) 2012 Rostelecom Cup	1	62.16	2	112.87	2	175.03
Jan 19–27, 2013	(United States) 2013 U.S. Championships	9	54.08	1	132.49	2	186.57
Feb 8–11, 2013	(Japan) 2013 Four Continents Championships	5	60.36	6	106.30	6	166.66
Mar 11–17, 2013	(Canada) 2013 World Championships	9	58.85	5	125.40	6	184.25
Apr 11–14, 2013	(Japan) 2013 World Team Trophy	3	60.98	3	127.05	1 (3)	188.03

Results in the 2013–14 season
Date	Event	SP		FS		Total	
Date	Event	P	Score	P	Score	P	Score
Sep 11–15, 2013	(United States) 2013 U.S. International Classic	1	58.49	3	106.19	2	164.68
Oct 25–27, 2013	2013 Skate Canada International	1	69.45	3	117.20	3	186.65
Nov 8–10, 2013	(Japan) 2013 NHK Trophy	4	62.83	3	114.98	4	177.81
Jan 5–12, 2014	(United States) 2014 U.S. Championships	1	72.12	1	139.57	1	211.69
Feb 6–9, 2014	(Russia) 2014 Winter Olympics (Team event)	–	–	2	129.38	3	–
Feb 19–20, 2014	(Russia) 2014 Winter Olympics	4	68.63	5	136.90	4	205.53
Mar 24–30, 2014	(Japan) 2014 World Championships	5	70.31	7	124.27	5	194.58

Results in the 2014–15 season
Date	Event	SP		FS		Total	
Date	Event	P	Score	P	Score	P	Score
Sep 25–27, 2014	(Germany) 2014 Nebelhorn Trophy	3	61.82	2	120.49	3	182.31
Oct 24–26, 2014	(United States) 2014 Skate America	3	60.81	3	118.57	3	179.38
Nov 28–30, 2014	(Japan) 2014 NHK Trophy	1	68.16	1	123.00	1	191.16
Jan 18–25, 2015	(United States) 2015 U.S. Championships	2	67.02	2	138.52	2	205.54
Feb 9–15, 2015	(South Korea) 2015 Four Continents Championships	2	62.67	5	113.91	4	176.58
Mar 23–29, 2015	(China) 2015 World Championships	8	60.73	2	128.23	4	188.96
Apr 16–19, 2015	(Japan) 2015 World Team Trophy	1	71.26	5	124.29	1 (3)	195.55

Results in the 2015–16 season
Date	Event	SP		FS		Total	
Date	Event	P	Score	P	Score	P	Score
Oct 3, 2015	2015 Japan Open	–	–	6	114.53	2	–
Oct 23–25, 2015	(United States) 2015 Skate America	2	65.39	1	137.41	2	202.80
Nov 13, 2015	(France) 2015 Trophée Éric Bompard	1	73.32	–	–	1	–
Dec 10–13, 2015	(Spain) 2015–16 Grand Prix Final	5	66.52	5	128.27	5	194.79
Jan 15–23, 2016	(United States) 2016 U.S. Championships	2	62.50	1	147.96	1	210.46
Feb 16–21, 2016	(Taiwan) 2016 Four Continents Championships	9	57.26	3	121.13	5	178.39
Mar 28 – Apr 3, 2016	(United States) 2016 World Championships	1	76.43	6	134.86	4	211.29
Apr 22–24, 2016	(United States) 2016 Team Challenge Cup	2	71.34	1	142.00	1 (4)	213.34

Note: The 2015 Trophée Éric Bompard was cancelled after the November 2015 Paris attacks. The short programs had been completed on November 13, but the free skating was to be held the next day. On November 23, the International Skating Union announced that the short program results would be considered as the final results for the competition.

Results in the 2016–17 season
Date	Event	SP		FS		Total	
Date	Event	P	Score	P	Score	P	Score
Oct 1, 2016	2016 Japan Open	–	–	6	108.24	3	–
Oct 21–23, 2016	(United States) 2016 Skate America	3	64.87	5	119.35	5	184.22
Nov 11–13, 2016	2016 Trophée de France	10	54.87	8	111.02	8	165.89
Dec 8–11, 2016	(Croatia) 2016 CS Golden Spin of Zagreb	8	54.04	5	104.98	6	159.02
Jan 14–22, 2017	(United States) 2017 U.S. Championships	5	64.85	9	114.77	6	179.62

Results in the 2018–19 season
Date	Event	SP		FS		Total	
Date	Event	P	Score	P	Score	P	Score
Nov 16–18, 2018	(Russia) 2018 Rostelecom Cup	10	37.51	–	–	–	WD

Results in the 2019–20 season
Date	Event	SP		FS		Total	
Date	Event	P	Score	P	Score	P	Score
Jan 20–26, 2020	(United States) 2020 U.S. Championships	13	54.51	12	107.24	12	161.75

Results in the 2020–21 season
Date	Event	SP		FS		Total	
Date	Event	P	Score	P	Score	P	Score
Oct 23–24, 2020	(United States) 2020 Skate America	12	46.36	12	81.46	12	127.82
Jan 11–21, 2021	(United States) 2021 U.S. Championships	12	53.88	13	95.17	13	149.05

Results in the 2021–22 season
Date	Event	SP		FS		Total	
Date	Event	P	Score	P	Score	P	Score
Aug 11–15, 2021	(United States) 2021 Cranberry Cup International	15	44.94	12	93.75	13	138.69
Jan 2–9, 2022	(United States) 2022 U.S. Championships	6	67.61	12	104.31	10	171.92

Results in the 2022–23 season
Date	Event	SP		FS		Total	
Date	Event	P	Score	P	Score	P	Score
Aug 4–7, 2022	(United States) 2022 Philadelphia Summer International	3	67.01	3	113.25	3	180.26
Sep 21–24, 2022	(Germany) 2022 CS Nebelhorn Trophy	15	45.08	12	93.81	12	138.89
Oct 21–23, 2022	(United States) 2022 Skate America	5	64.18	6	109.91	6	174.09
Nov 9–13, 2022	(Austria) 2022 CS Ice Challenge	7	55.00	12	99.22	9	154.22
Jan 26–28, 2023	(United States) 2023 U.S. Championships	5	67.44	11	106.54	8	173.98

=== Junior level ===
Results in the 2011–12 season
Date	Event	SP		FS		Total	
Date	Event	P	Score	P	Score	P	Score
Oct 12–15, 2011	2011 JGP Estonia	1	60.18	1	112.51	1	172.69
Jan 22–29, 2012	(United States) 2012 U.S. Championships (Junior)	1	60.21	1	118.71	1	178.92
Feb 27 – Mar 4, 2012	(Belarus) 2012 World Junior Championships	2	58.00	2	113.85	2	171.85

== Bibliography ==
- Outofshapeworthlessloser: A Memoir of Figure Skating, F*cking Up, and Figuring It Out (2024)
