= Moments in Between =

- Standard cover

Studio album by Ruth B
- Released: September 24, 2021
- Genre: Pop-soul
- Length: 34:33
- Label: Downtown; BMG
- Producer: Patrick Wimberly; Doug Schadt; Justin Raisen; Sad Pony; Ido Zmishlany; D-Mile; Homer Steinweiss; Paul Spring; Khaya Cohen

Ruth B chronology
Maybe I'll Find You Again (2019)	Moments in Between (2021)	Peace to Make (2026)

Singles from Moments in Between
- 1. "Dirty Nikes" Released: August 28, 2020; 2. "Situation" Released: April 16, 2021; 3. "Die Fast" Released: May 20, 2021

Moments in Between is the second studio album by Canadian singer-songwriter Ruth B. It was released on September 24, 2021, through Downtown Records and BMG Rights Management. Patrick Wimberly executively produced the album, which was supported by three singles "Dirty Nikes", "Situation", and "Die Fast".

== Background ==
Executively produced by Patrick Wimberly, Moments in Between was released on September 24, 2017, via Downtown Records and BMG Rights Management as the follow-up to Ruth B's debut studio album, Safe Haven (2017). Discussing the album, Ruth stated that songwriting had long served as a "therapeutic" outlet for her, and described the record as exploring feelings of being "lonely or heartbroken or happy".

== Composition ==
Moments in Between is composed of pop-soul songs and combines elements of R&B, pop, folk, and guitar-driven sounds. Its songs are characterized by warm vocals, hazy harmonies, and shifting textures, while its lyrics explore themes of anxiety, uncertainty, and personal growth experienced during Ruth B's mid-twenties.

== Promotion and release ==
Ruth B debuted "Dirty Nike" as the lead single of Moments in Between on August 28, 2020, along with the accompanying music video. She announced the album Moments in Between on April 16, 2021, sharing the second single "Situation" and its music video. On May 20, "Die Fast" was premiered on Nylon, becoming the album's third single.

== Critical reception ==
Professional ratings
Review scores
Source	Rating
Beats per Minute	70%
MusicOMH	3/5 stars

JT Early of Beats per Minute considered Moments in Between a mature progression from Safe Haven, describing it as "more grandiose, sweeping and mature" while retaining the intimacy associated with her earlier work. Although he felt that the track sequencing occasionally seemed unbalanced, he concluded that the album demonstrates Ruth B's willingness to "deviate from expectations while still keeping the essence of her sound". Reviewing for MusicOMH, John Murphy described Moments in Between as a "pretty smooth sequel" to Safe Haven, as he praised its collection of "flawlessly produced and performed pop-soul songs". He commended the album's broader sonic range and highlighted "Situation" and "Die Fast" among its strongest tracks, while arguing that parts of the record could sound "a bit samey" and criticizing several songs for lacking personality. Nevertheless, Murphy concluded that Ruth B's voice was capable of carrying even the album's "weaker moments".

== Track listing ==
Standard edition
No.	Title	Producer(s)	Length
1.	"Princess Peach"	Patrick Wimberly; Doug Schadt	3:33
2.	"Holiday Interlude"	Justin Raisen; Sad Pony; Wimberly	0:32
3.	"Holiday"	Pony; Raisen; Wimberly	2:35
4.	"Situation"	Ido Zmishlany	3:31
5.	"Sweet Chamomile"	Raisen; Wimberly	3:29
6.	"Favourite"	D-Mile	3:45
7.	"Spaceship"	Homer Steinweiss; Paul Spring; Wimberly	3:32
8.	"Die Fast"	Wimberly; Raisen; Khaya Cohen	3:40
9.	"Dirty Nikes"	Wimberly	3:19
10.	"Moments in Between"	Wimberly	3:54
11.	"Share"	Wimberly	2:51
Total length:			34:33

Deluxe special edition
No.	Title	Producer(s)	Length
12.	"Dandelions" (NY Rooftop Sessions Live)	Ruth B	4:00
13.	"Spaceship" (Acoustic NY Rooftop Sessions Live)	Ruth B	3:56
14.	"Dirty Nikes" (Lupe Fiasco remix)	Wimberly	3:28
15.	"Situation" (Smle remix)		2:44
Total length:			48:40
