= Villainous Freestyle =

2025 single by Hanumankind and ColorsxStudios

Single by Hanumankind

from the album Monsoon Season
- Released: July 11, 2025
- Recorded: 2025
- Genre: Hip hop; trap
- Length: 2:34
- Label: Capitol Records
- Songwriter: Sooraj Cherukat
- Producer: Kalmi

Hanumankind singles chronology
"Holiday - A COLORS SHOW" (2025)	"Villainous Freestyle" (2025)	"Ez-Ez" (2025)

Music video
- "Villainous Freestyle" on YouTube

Villainous Freestyle is a single by Indian rapper Hanumankind. Produced by Kalmi, it was released under Capitol Records and UMG Recordings. "Villainous Freestyle" serves as one of the lead singles to Hanumankind's mixtape, Monsoon Season. The track was released on July 11, 2025, two weeks before the mixtape's official release.

The track fuses Indian hip hop with Southern hip-hop.

== Background ==
The track was originally released as a freestyle onto the On The Radar YouTube channel on October 24, 2024.

== Release ==
Following the freestyle's release on October 24, 2024, Hanumankind would later release it nine months later on July 11, 2025, as one of the lead singles for his upcoming mixtape, which he announced in the video.

== Music video ==
The cinematic music video for the track, directed by Bijoy Shetty, sees Hanumankind jump off a cliff to announce the release and debut of his next mixtape, titled Monsoon Season. In the video, a slow-motion cinematic teaser features him leaping off a cliff with a crew of friends.

== Critical response ==
"Villainous Freestyle" received positive reviews from critics. Bryson "Boom" Paul of HotNewHipHop wrote how the track "is short but explosive—packed with razor-edged bars, commanding delivery, and the kind of unfiltered confidence that’s become a staple in his catalog". Paul also gave praise to Hanumankind's vocal flows, writing how "his flow cuts through the track like a blade, navigating rapid-fire cadences and bold declarations". To end off his review, Paul wrote how "the freestyle doesn't rely on hooks or gimmicks—it’s all muscle, all movement. Hanumankind’s tone remains both grounded and godlike, balancing his underground roots with cinematic vision".

The track also went viral on platforms such as Reddit and YouTube, with fans calling the track “pure heat” and “one of the best freestyles in recent memory".

Luna of Rating Games Music wrote how "Villainous Freestyle" is one of the most fun tracks off the mixtape. She wrote how "upbeat, dramatic, and cinematic" the song is; "like something straight out of a movie soundtrack. It strikes that perfect balance where you could either dance along or just rock your head to the rhythm". Following her review, she wrote how the track showcases Hanumankind's ability to deliver sharp, fast, and commanding bars and flows, making his voice stand out.

== Credits ==
Credits adapted from Apple Music.

- Vocals - Sooraj Cherukat
- Composer - Sooraj Cherukat, Sai Nikhil Kalmireddy
- Recording engineer - Sai Nikhil Kalmireddy
- Mastering engineer - Akash Shravan, Chennai
- Mixing engineer - Akash Shravan, Chennai
- Immersive mixing engineer - Brian Stanley
