= Run It Up =

Run It Up may refer to:

== Songs ==
- "Run It Up" (Hanumankind song), 2025
- "Run It Up" (Lil Tjay song), 2021
- "Run It Up", by Coi Leray from Coi, 2023
- "Run It Up", by Marshmello from Joytime III, 2019
- "Run It Up", by Nav from Good Intentions, 2020
- "Run It Up", by the Game from The Documentary III, 2026
- "RunItUp", by Tyler, the Creator from Call Me If You Get Lost, 2021

== Other uses ==
- Run It Up, a live poker series by Jason Somerville
