= Superficial Love =

Single by Ruth B

from the album Safe Haven
- Released: February 24, 2017
- Length: 3:27 (EP version); 3:39 (single version)
- Label: Columbia; Sony
- Songwriter: Ruth Berhe
- Producer: Berhe

Ruth B singles chronology
"Lost Boy" (2015)	"Superficial Love" (2017)	"Rare" (2018)

Music video
- "Superficial Love" on YouTube

"Superficial Love" is a single by Canadian singer Ruth B. It was originally released on November 27, 2015, alongside her debut extended play (EP), The Intro. The song was then released in a single version on February 24, 2017. The music video for "Superficial Love" was released on March 31, 2017 on YouTube.

== Background ==
According to Ruth B, "Superficial Love" was written while she was feeling angry and served as an outlet for her emotions. She explained that the song conveys a message about refusing to settle for superficial relationships and recognizing people who "don't have the best intentions".

== Release and promotion ==
Ruth B revealed a lyric video of "Superficial Love" exclusively on the Billboard magazine on February 23, 2017. The video incorporates animated lyrics, shifting color palettes, and playful visual elements.

== Music video ==
The music video for "Superficial Love" was released on March 31, 2017, on Ruth B's Vevo channel on YouTube. As of June 2021, the video has over 21 million views.

== Charts ==
Chart (2017)	Peak position
Canada AC (Billboard)	19
Canada Hot AC (Billboard)	29
Canada CHR/Top 40 (Billboard)	44

== Certifications ==
Region	Certification	Certified units/sales
Canada (Music Canada)	Gold	40,000^{‡}
New Zealand (RMNZ)	Gold	15,000^{‡}
United States (RIAA)	Gold	500,000^{‡}
^{‡} Sales+streaming figures based on certification alone.
