= Lost Boy (song) =

Single by Ruth B

from the album The Intro and Safe Haven
- Released: February 12, 2015
- Recorded: 2014
- Genre: Pop
- Length: 4:36 (album version); 4:11 (radio edit)
- Label: Columbia; Sony
- Songwriter: Ruth B

Ruth B singles chronology
"Lost Boy" (2015)	"Superficial Love" (2017)

Music video
- "Lost Boy" on YouTube

"Lost Boy" is the debut single by Canadian singer Ruth B. It was released on February 12, 2015. She first released it by singing a six-second video on Vine in January 2015.

== Composition and history ==
The piano pop ballad is written in the key of G major in cut time with a tempo of 62 beats per minute. It follows a chord progression of Em – G/D – C – G, and Berhe's vocals span from F♯_{3} to B_{4}.

In November 2014, she posted a Vine of her singing a line that she had made up, which was inspired by the television series Once Upon a Time. The video went viral, and garnered around 84,000 likes within a week. Taking note of its popularity and with encouragement from her followers, she adapted it into a full song titled "Lost Boy", which she posted on YouTube on January 18, 2015 and was released on iTunes on February 12, 2015. Dozens of Vine and YouTube users posted covers, which helped further its popularity and increased Berhe's following on social media. Record labels took notice and she then signed with Columbia Records in July 2015.

Her debut EP, The Intro, was released on November 27, 2015. It has four songs including "Lost Boy".

== Music video ==
A music video for the song was released on YouTube on May 9, 2016. As of May 2026, the video has garnered over 194 million views.

== Critical reception ==
Mike Wass of Idolator called it a "pretty ballad" and went on to say that "[Lost Boy] is nostalgic, more than a little bittersweet and aptly showcases Ruth's smooth vocals."

== Charts ==
=== Weekly charts ===
Chart (2015–2016)	Peak position
Belgium Urban (Ultratop Flanders)	28
Canada Hot 100 (Billboard)	14
Canada AC (Billboard)	16
Canada CHR/Top 40 (Billboard)	18
Canada Hot AC (Billboard)	9
Denmark (Tracklisten)	14
Ireland (IRMA)	89
Netherlands (Single Top 100)	41
Scottish Singles Sales (Official Charts)	57
Sweden (Sverigetopplistan)	19
UK Singles (Official Charts)	97
US Billboard Hot 100	24
US Adult Contemporary (Billboard)	13
US Adult Pop Airplay (Billboard)	6
US Pop Airplay (Billboard)	16

=== Year-end charts ===
Chart (2016)	Position
Canada (Canadian Hot 100)	46
Denmark (Tracklisten)	57
Netherlands (Single Top 100)	95
Sweden (Sverigetopplistan)	48
US Billboard Hot 100	76
US Adult Contemporary (Billboard)	35
US Adult Top 40 (Billboard)	32

== Certifications ==
Region	Certification	Certified units/sales
Canada (Music Canada)	6× Platinum	480,000^{‡}
Denmark (IFPI Danmark)	3× Platinum	270,000^{‡}
Germany (BVMI)	Gold	200,000^{‡}
Italy (FIMI)	Gold	25,000^{‡}
Mexico (AMPROFON)	Gold	30,000^{‡}
Netherlands (NVPI)	Platinum	30,000^{‡}
New Zealand (RMNZ)	2× Platinum	60,000^{‡}
Poland (ZPAV)	Gold	25,000^{‡}
Sweden (GLF)	3× Platinum	120,000^{‡}
United Kingdom (BPI)	Platinum	600,000^{‡}
United States (RIAA)	4× Platinum	1,300,000
^{‡} Sales+streaming figures based on certification alone.
