= No Batidão =

Single by Zxkai and Slxughter
- Released: 5 September 2025
- Length: 1:29 (original)
- Label: Rubix
- Songwriters: Zxkai; Slxughter
- Producers: Zxkai; Slxughter

Zxkai singles chronology
"Sem Prada" (2025)	"No Batidão" (2025)	"Whisky Batendo" (2025)

Slxughter singles chronology
"Greed" (2025)	"No Batidão" (2025)	"Wrath" (2026)

"No Batidão" is a song by Zxkai and Slxughter, released by Rubix Records on 5 September 2025.

== Commercial performance ==
Released in early September 2025, the song began appearing on some official charts in Europe about two months after its release, starting with Switzerland, France, Austria, and Germany in the first half of November. At the end of the month, the single achieved its first number one by reaching the top of the International Top 20 Singles published by the Indian Music Industry (IMI). Debuting at number 171 on the Billboard Global 200 dated 22 November 2025, the song reached the top 50 on the chart dated 10 January 2026.

== Track listing ==
- Digital download and streaming
1. "No Batidão" – 1:29
2. "No Batidão" (slowed) – 1:47
3. "No Batidão" (super slowed) – 1:57
- Digital download and streaming – ultra slowed
1. "No Batidão" (ultra slowed) – 2:06
- Digital download and streaming – remix
1. "No Batidão" (remix) – 2:39

== Charts ==
=== Weekly charts ===
Weekly chart performance for "No Batidão"
Chart (2025–2026)	Peak position
Austria (Ö3 Austria Top 40)	15
Canada Hot 100 (Billboard)	52
Czech Republic Singles Digital (ČNS IFPI)	56
France (SNEP)	32
Germany (GfK)	10
Germany Dance (GfK)	1
Global 200 (Billboard)	28
Greece International (IFPI)	79
India International (IMI)	1
Ireland (IRMA)	78
Israel (Mako Hitlist)	66
Italy (FIMI)	71
Japan Hot Overseas (Billboard Japan)	4
Luxembourg (Billboard)	11
Malaysia International (RIM)	12
Middle East and North Africa (IFPI)	9
Netherlands (Single Top 100)	61
Norway (IFPI Norge)	50
Poland (Polish Streaming Top 100)	69
Portugal (AFP)	27
Russia Streaming (TopHit)	12
Saudi Arabia (IFPI)	11
Singapore (RIAS)	14
Slovakia Singles Digital (ČNS IFPI)	53
Sweden (Sverigetopplistan)	42
Switzerland (Schweizer Hitparade)	12
United Arab Emirates (IFPI)	16
UK Singles (Official Charts)	69
UK Dance (Official Charts)	12
UK Independent (Official Charts)	24
US Hot Dance/Electronic Songs (Billboard)	3
US World Digital Song Sales (Billboard)	7

=== Monthly charts ===
Monthly chart performance for "No Batidão"
Chart (2026)	Peak position
Russia Streaming (TopHit)	10

== Certifications ==
Certifications and sales for "No Batidão"
Region	Certification	Certified units/sales
Belgium (BRMA)	Platinum	40,000^{‡}
France (SNEP)	Platinum	200,000^{‡}
Italy (FIMI)	Gold	100,000^{‡}
New Zealand (RMNZ)	Gold	15,000^{‡}
Portugal (AFP)	Platinum	25,000^{‡}
Spain (Promusicae)	Gold	50,000^{‡}
United Kingdom (BPI)	Silver	200,000^{‡}
United States (RIAA)	Gold	500,000^{‡}
^{‡} Sales+streaming figures based on certification alone.
