= Big Dawgs =

2024 single by Hanumankind and Kalmi

Single by Hanumankind and Kalmi

from the album Monsoon Season
- Released: July 9, 2024
- Genre: Hip hop
- Length: 3:10
- Label: Universal India
- Songwriter: Sooraj Cherukat
- Producer: Kalmi

Hanumankind singles chronology
"Ayyayyo" (2023)	"Big Dawgs" (2024)	"Run It Up" (2025)

Kalmi singles chronology
"Move with Meaning" / "Beyond Everyday" (2024)	"Big Dawgs" (2024)	"Run It Up" (2025)

Music video
- "Big Dawgs" on YouTube

ASAP Rocky remix cover

ASAP Rocky singles chronology
"Ruby Rosary" (2024)	"Big Dawgs" (Remix) (2024)	"Pray4DaGang" (2025)

"Big Dawgs" is a song recorded by Indian rapper Hanumankind together with producer Kalmi. It was released on July 9, 2024, by Universal Music India. The music video, in which Hanumankind performs within a classic carnival attraction known as the "well of death", was released on the same day. A remix featuring American rapper ASAP Rocky was released on December 5, 2024.

== Music video ==
=== Development ===
The music video for "Big Dawgs", directed by Bijoy Shetty, was shot in Ponnani, Kerala in a well of death. According to creative director Bijoy Shetty, Cherukat initially proposed using cars and bikes in the video. Shetty was against this idea, believing it would blend in with other content and lack originality. This resistance led to a moment of inspiration: While Shetty was in a rickshaw; he heard a bike engine that resonated with the song's sample. Afterward, Shetty researched and conceptualized the video. Shetty remarked, "It was an idea that everybody had in their mind but never executed. It was an idea waiting to be done". All of the framework was planned for the eventual filming which was done in one day; Cherukat experienced motion sickness after frequent riding on one of the stunt-cars.

=== Synopsis ===
In the video, the opening screen displays a typical "Warning" message indicating that the stunts were performed by professionals and advising viewers not to attempt them. However, Hanumankind interrupts this warning by saying, "Hey, shut the f*ck up", effectively dismissing the message. The video cuts to Hanumankind standing at the edge of a well of death, surrounded by a group of stunt performers. As the song begins, the performers ride their motorcycles and drive a car around the well at high speeds. The performance scenes are interspersed with shots of the audience, who are mesmerized by the show.

== Commercial performance ==
"Big Dawgs" reached number 23 on the US Billboard Hot 100 on the most recent chart. In Australia, it reached number 9 on the ARIA Singles Chart. The song reached number 9 on the Canadian Hot 100 and number 2 on the Official New Zealand Music Chart, respectively to-date. Additionally, it peaked at number 9 on the Billboard Global 200.

=== Reception ===
"Big Dawgs" quickly gained international acclaim, debuting at number 57 on the US Billboard Hot 100. The song has amassed over 400 million streams on Spotify and went viral on TikTok with 150 million views, and over 2,000,000 searches on Shazam. Its success led to Hanumankind being featured on the cover of Spotify's Global Hip Hop Playlist and signing with Capitol Records. Outside of India, the song peaked within the top ten in countries including Australia, Austria, Canada, Singapore, Switzerland, and Brazil.

The song's music video went viral, with content creators sharing reaction videos online; one of them from streamer Shaquille Davis notably praised its production, identifying Hanumankind's Texas rap influences as well as his fashion reminiscent of Freddie Mercury. Samaah Noor Sheikh, writing for The Print, criticized the American streamer IShowSpeed for repeatedly asking "Why does he sound good?" in his reaction— "as if it was hard for him to believe that an Indian rapper could actually be good". Despite this, Sheikh acknowledged that IShowSpeed's reaction helped platform the Indian music scene.

Some accused the song of ripping off the flow of American rapper Project Pat, although Hanumankind makes a direct reference to Project Pat in the lyrics.

== Remix ==
Following the success of the original "Big Dawgs", Hanumankind then teamed up with A$AP Rocky for the remix. On the remix, the track is extended by another forty seconds, featuring Rocky's verse, and an extended two verses by Hanumankind. The track remix sees Hanumankind blend his Keralan roots with Rocky's signature New York swagger.

=== Background ===
The track was first previewed at Rolling Loud, Thailand, where Rocky brought out Hanumankind to perform the song together. Following the track's performance, Hanumankind would go on Instagram to announce via a post stating that the single will be released soon.

=== Reception ===
"Big Dawgs (Remix)" was well-received amongst music critics and fans. Marcus Aurelius of LiFTED wrote how "Hanumankind of A$AP Rocky made history with this one" writing how Rocky "goes straight from the jump and gets into his pocket", and how Hanumankind shows to fans worldwide why he's "next level" now. Aurelius also wrote that Rocky "felt so motivated by the banging beat" that he decided to "double-dip and go for seconds" on the song, referring to the fact that he wrote two verses rather than just one.

== Usage in media ==
In the popular Battle royale game, Fortnite, "Big Dawgs" had its own emote within the game, with the emote being a part of Fortnite's Icon Series. It is available for 500 Vbucks.

In 2025, it was used in an advertisement for Lenovo Legion, and in the credits of the fifth episode of Goosebumps: The Vanishing. in early 2026, in an advertisement from Papa Johns.

== Charts ==
=== Weekly charts ===
Weekly chart performance for "Big Dawgs"
Chart (2024)	Peak position
Australia (ARIA)	9
Australia Hip Hop/R&B (ARIA)	1
Austria (Ö3 Austria Top 40)	5
Canada (Canadian Hot 100)	9
Czech Republic Singles Digital (ČNS IFPI)	5
Finland (Suomen virallinen lista)	48
France (SNEP)	170
Germany (GfK)	11
Global 200 (Billboard)	9
Greece International (IFPI)	23
Hungary (Single Top 40)	38
Iceland (Tónlistinn)	19
India (Billboard)	3
India International (IMI)	1
Ireland (IRMA)	30
Latvia (LaIPA)	1
Lithuania (AGATA)	7
Lithuania Airplay (TopHit)	57
Luxembourg (Billboard)	20
Malaysia (Billboard)	7
Malaysia International (RIM)	7
MENA (IFPI)	2
Netherlands (Single Top 100)	66
New Zealand (Recorded Music NZ)	2
Norway (VG-lista)	26
Philippines (Philippines Hot 100)	72
Poland (Polish Streaming Top 100)	13
Portugal (AFP)	110
Saudi Arabia (IFPI)	17
Singapore (RIAS)	8
Slovakia Singles Digital (ČNS IFPI)	4
South Africa (Billboard)	10
South Korea Download (Circle)	171
Sweden (Sverigetopplistan)	44
Switzerland (Schweizer Hitparade)	9
UAE (IFPI)	2
UK Singles (Official Charts)	15
UK Asian Music (OCC)	1
UK Hip Hop/R&B (Official Charts)	2
US Billboard Hot 100	23
US Hot R&B/Hip-Hop Songs (Billboard)	5
US Rhythmic (Billboard)	25

=== Monthly charts ===
Monthly chart performance for "Big Dawgs"
Chart (2024)	Position
Czech Republic (Singles Digitál – Top 100)	14

=== Year-end charts ===
2024 year-end chart performance for "Big Dawgs"
Chart (2024)	Position
Australia Hip Hop/R&B (ARIA)	36
Canada (Canadian Hot 100)	86
Global 200 (Billboard)	180
India International (IMI)	6
US Hot R&B/Hip-Hop Songs (Billboard)	53

2025 year-end chart performance for "Big Dawgs"
Chart (2025)	Position
US Hot R&B/Hip-Hop Songs (Billboard)	96

== Certifications ==
Certifications for "Big Dawgs"
Region	Certification	Certified units/sales
Brazil (Pro-Música Brasil)	Platinum	40,000^{‡}
Canada (Music Canada)	3× Platinum	240,000^{‡}
New Zealand (RMNZ)	Platinum	30,000^{‡}
Poland (ZPAV)	Platinum	50,000^{‡}
United Kingdom (BPI)	Silver	200,000^{‡}
^{‡} Sales+streaming figures based on certification alone.
