= Monsoon Season =

Mixtape by Hanumankind
- Released: July 25, 2025
- Genre: Hip hop
- Length: 39:57
- Labels: Capitol; Def Jam India; Universal
- Producers: Hisab, Kalmi, Parimal Shais

Singles from Monsoon Season
- 1. "Big Dawgs" Released: July 9, 2024; 2. "Run It Up" Released: March 6, 2025; 3. "Holiday" Released: May 29, 2025; 4. "Villainous Freestyle" Released: July 11, 2025

Monsoon Season is the debut mixtape from Hanumankind. The mixtape was released on July 25, 2025, via Capitol Records, Def Jam Recordings, and Universal Music Group. The project features collaborations with artists such as A$AP Rocky, Denzel Curry, Maxo Kream, Roisee, and Rudy Mukta.

== Background and recording ==
There were no mentions of the mixtape until July 11, 2025, apart from a teasing while performing "Holiday" at A Colors Show, when Hanumankind posted the official music video for "Villainous Freestyle". In the music video, he announced the mixtape title, revealed the track list, and confirmed the release date.

"Big Dawgs" was the first lead single from the mixtape, produced by Kalmi. Released on July 9, 2024, by Universal Music India, the track gained international acclaim, debuting at number 57 on the US Billboard Hot 100. The music video, directed by Bijoy Shetty, was filmed inside a traditional "well of death" carnival attraction in Ponnani, Kerala. The single amassed over 400 million streams on Spotify. Its success led to Hanumankind being featured on the cover of Spotify's Global Hip Hop Playlist and signing with Capitol Records.

A remix featuring American rapper A$AP Rocky was released on December 5, 2024. The track was first previewed when the two performed it together at Rolling Loud Thailand. The remix featured new verses from Hanumankind, as well as a slowed-down part midway through the song, which was originally heard at the end of the original one.

Released in March 2025, "Run It Up", the second lead single, reunited Hanumankind with producer Kalmi and director Bijoy Shetty. Drawing on traditional chenda drums of Kerala, its music video showcases martial art forms such as Kalaripayattu, Mardani khel, Gatka, Thang Ta, and Theyyam.

Hanumankind released the track “Holiday” through the live performance platform A Colors Show. Produced by Parimal Shais and Kalmi, the song featured a performance that combined lyrics with a forceful delivery. Following its release, Hanumankind appeared at Netflix’s Tudum live event. The performance received coverage in the press as a “bold and commanding” display of his artistic range.

Originally performed at "On The Radar", the track that later became widely known as "Villainous Freestyle" was released on October 24, 2024, on YouTube and re-released on all streaming platforms under the new title on July 11, 2025, just a week before the album's release.

== Release ==
Monsoon Season was released on July 25, 2025, featuring production from longtime collaborators Parimal Shais and Kalmi.

== Critical reception ==
Professional ratings
Review scores
| Source | Rating |
|---|---|
| Rolling Stone India | 4/5 stars |

Critics have praised Monsoon Season for its fusion of cultural elements and modern rap, highlighting Hanumankind's lyrical prowess and innovative production. Critics praised “Run It Up” as a powerful ode to Indian culture, spotlighting resilience, cultural pride, and stunning visuals, and "Villainous Freestyle" for his confident delivery, rapid-fire cadences, and cultural duality, recognizing it as an early defining moment in his rise. The rebranding helped him reach a broader audience and solidified Hanumankind's reputation as a rising global talent.

== Impact ==
The song "Goons", featuring Maxo Kream, was featured on the soundtrack of the American drama series Deli Boys.

== Track listing ==
Monsoon Season – Standard edition track listing
| No. | Title | Writer(s) | Producer(s) | Length |
|---|---|---|---|---|
| 1. | "Reckless" (featuring Denzel Curry) | Hanumankind; Denzel Curry | Kalmi, Hisab | 2:33 |
| 2. | "Big Dawgs" (featuring Kalmi) | Hanumankind; Kalmi | Kalmi | 3:11 |
| 3. | "Goons" (featuring Maxo Kream) | Hanumankind; Maxo Kream | Parimal Shais | 3:09 |
| 4. | "Run It Up" | Hanumankind; Kalmi | Kalmi | 2:54 |
| 5. | "Someone Told Me" (featuring Roisee) | Hanumankind; Roisee | Kalmi | 5:10 |
| 6. | "Cause" (featuring Rudy Mukta) | Hanumankind; Rudy Mukta | Kalmi | 3:00 |
| 7. | "29.11.23" | Hanumankind | Kalmi | 2:30 |
| 8. | "Monsoon Season" | Hanumankind | Kalmi | 3:00 |
| 9. | "Holiday" | Hanumankind | Kalmi, Parimal Shais | 3:30 |
| 10. | "Villainous Freestyle" | Hanumankind | Kalmi | 3:00 |
| 11. | "Sicko" | Hanumankind | Kalmi | 3:00 |
| 12. | "Big Dawgs (Remix)" (featuring A$AP Rocky) | Hanumankind; A$AP Rocky | Kalmi | 3:30 |
| Total length: | | | | 39:57 |
