= Victory Lap (Fred Again, PlaqueBoyMax and Skepta song) =

Single by Fred Again, PlaqueBoyMax and Skepta

from the album The Fork and Knife & USB
- Released: 17 June 2025
- Genre: Hip hop; dubstep; grime
- Length: 2:46
- Label: Atlantic Records
- Songwriters: Fred Gibson; Jaylah Ji'mya Hickmon; Joseph Adenuga; Kaylon Berry; Maria-Cecilia Simone Kelly
- Producers: Berwyn Du Bois; Blake Cascoe; Dan Mayo; Darcy Lewis; Fred Again; PlaqueBoyMax

Fred Again singles chronology
"Light Dark Light" (2024)	"Victory Lap" (2025)	"Air Maxes" (2025)

Skepta singles chronology
"Cops & Robbers" (2025)	"Victory Lap" (2025)	"Friendly Fire" (2025)

PlaqueBoyMax singles chronology
"4 Doors" (2025)	"Victory Lap" (2025)	"Yea Yea / 5 Star" (2025)

Music video
- "Victory Lap" on YouTube

"Victory Lap" is a song by British record producer Fred Again, American online streamer and producer PlaqueBoyMax and British rapper Skepta. It was released on 17 June 2025, through Atlantic, and included on Skepta's sixth studio album, The Fork and Knife, and Fred Again's compilation album, USB. The song samples "Swamp Bitches" by Doechii and Rico Nasty and received nomination for Best Dance/Electronic Recording at the 68th Annual Grammy Awards.

== Background and release ==
Fred Again began teasing the song during his Twitch livestreams prior to its official release. On 17 June 2025, Skepta joined Fred Again in New York, where they debuted the single during a four-hour Twitch livestream. A pop-up rave was also announced at the Brooklyn Paramount, drawing a large crowd of fans who gathered outside the venue.

On 9 July 2025, a remix of the song featuring Denzel Curry, titled "Victory Lap Two", was released. On 16 July 2025, a second remix featuring an additional verse from Hanumankind, titled "Victory Lap Three", was released. On 23 July 2025, a fourth version of the song featuring a verse from That Mexican OT was released. "Victory Lap Five", featuring D Double E and Lyny, was released on 5 September 2025.

== Composition ==
"Victory Lap" is a dubstep song, which blends Skepta's grime style with electronic production. The song samples Doechii's verse from her collaborative track with Rico Nasty, "Swamp Bitches", which was released in 2022.

== Remixes ==
Four remixes of Victory Lap were released, titled Victory Lap Two through Five, each one adding additional featured artists such as That Mexican OT, Denzel Curry, Hanumankind, D Double E, and LYNY.

== Use in other media ==
Victory Lap was one of many songs featured on the soundtrack for EA Sports FC 26, though multiple elements of the song were censored.

The song was also featured in the second trailer for the 2026 crime thriller film Crime 101, which was written and directed by Bart Layton and starred Chris Hemsworth, Mark Ruffalo, Barry Keoghan and Halle Berry.

== Charts ==
=== Weekly charts ===
Weekly chart performance for "Victory Lap"
Chart (2025)	Peak position
Australia (ARIA)	3
Australia Dance (ARIA)	1
Canada Hot 100 (Billboard)	75
Estonia Airplay (TopHit)	59
Global 200 (Billboard)	112
Ireland (IRMA)	14
Latvia Streaming (LaIPA)	9
Lithuania Airplay (TopHit)	24
New Zealand (Recorded Music NZ)	2
UK Singles (Official Charts)	4
UK Hip Hop/R&B (Official Charts)	1
US Hot Dance/Electronic Songs (Billboard)	4

=== Monthly charts ===
Monthly chart performance for "Victory Lap"
Chart (2025)	Peak position
Estonia Airplay (TopHit)	67
Lithuania Airplay (TopHit)	43

=== Year-end charts ===
Year-end chart performance for "Victory Lap"
Chart (2025)	Position
Australia (ARIA)	48
New Zealand (Recorded Music NZ)	39
UK Singles (OCC)	81
US Hot Dance/Electronic Songs (Billboard)	8

== Certifications ==
Certifications for "Victory Lap"
Region	Certification	Certified units/sales
Australia (ARIA)	2× Platinum	140,000^{‡}
New Zealand (RMNZ)	2× Platinum	60,000^{‡}
United Kingdom (BPI)	Platinum	600,000^{‡}
^{‡} Sales+streaming figures based on certification alone.
