= Run It Up (Hanumankind song) =

Single by Hanumankind

from the album Monsoon Season
- Released: March 6, 2025
- Recorded: 2025
- Genre: Hip hop
- Label: Capitol Records; Universal Music
- Songwriters: Sooraj Cherukat, Nikhil Kalimireddy
- Producer: Kalmi

Hanumankind singles chronology
"The Game Don't Stop - Squid Game 2" (2024)	"Run It Up" (2025)	"Holiday - A COLORS SHOW" (2025)

"Run It Up" is a song recorded by Indian rapper Hanumankind, released on March 6, 2025, through Capitol Records, and Universal Music. It is the fourth track to his debut mixtape, Monsoon Season, and was one of the five promotional singles for the album.

== Background, artistry, and lyricism ==
The track was produced by Kalmi, and invokes Theyyam rituals by pairing the modern hip-hop production with chenda drums.

Lyrically, the song sees Hanumankind vows to "run it up" for himself, others, and for his ancestors. Despite the negativity he's experienced, he's willing to place a bet on himself and push through, which is something that he doesn't want to lose.

== Music video ==
The music video, directed by Bijoy Shetty, features traditional Indian martial arts such as the kalaripayattu, gatka, thang ta and the Garudan thukkam. Additionally to the Garuda in the latter art, the music video references the tribal deities Kandanar Kelan and Muthappan.

== Critical reception ==
On their year-end charts, Rolling Stone ranked "Run It Up" at #91 out of #100. Reviewer Clayton Purdom wrote about how the track sees Hanumankind go "bigger than "Big Dawgs", employing a cast of dozens for a martial-arts brawl". Purdom also cites how the beat keeps pace while staying filled with classical Chenda drums, which grow more "manic" by the second. The beat sees Hanumankind "stand square in the middle of the chaos, fighting against the beat and winning". Additionally, on their "The 25 Best Hip-Hop Songs of 2025" list, Purdom ranked the song at #18 out of #25.

=== In other media ===
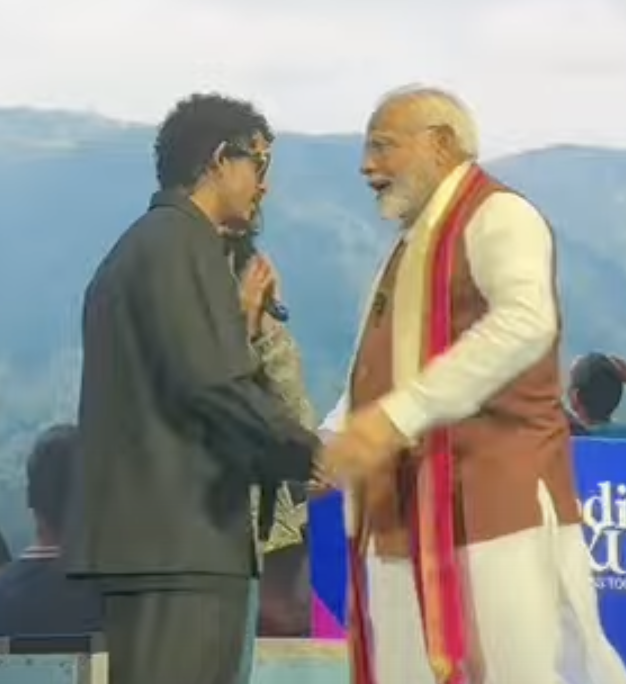
Hanumankind meeting Narendra Modi.

Prime Minister of India Narendra Modi praised Hanumankind and the music video on his radio show Mann Ki Baat for promoting Indigenous martial arts.

Fox 11 Los Angeles meteorologist Adam Kreuger referenced the song in social media posts on Instagram. Hanumankind commented "Legend" under the post, with Kalmi replying "thank u sir".

== Charts ==
Chart performance for “Run It Up”
Chart (2025)	Peak position	Debut position	Weeks on chart
New Zealand Hot Singles (Recorded Music NZ)	24	24	1

== Credits and personnel ==
All credits received from Tidal.

- Vocals - Hanumankind
- Producer - Kalmi
- Composer - Hanumankind, Kalmi
- Engineer - Amrith Raghunathan, Jordan Rugo
- Mixing engineer - Akash Sharavan
