= John Wilson (ice skating company) =

John Wilson is a British company that is engaged in the design, development, manufacturing and selling of figure skating blades since 1696. John Wilson is owned by parent company HD Sports who also owns MK Blades.

The company is headquartered in Sheffield; a city in South Yorkshire, England. Sheffield gained an international reputation in the 19th century for steel production.

== History ==
The company traces its history to 1696. John Wilson was a royal toolmaker and Sheffield engineer. He came to the attention of the British royal family who commissioned a pair of blades to be made by Wilson for King William III. Wilson's reputation grew and in 1841, Queen Victoria instructed the company to make a pair of ice skates for her and her husband, Prince Albert.

Engineers Hattersley & Davidson (est. 1894) acquired the John Wilson in the early 20th century and further developed John Wilson's reputation for innovation. Skate company Mitchel & King then joined the stable in 1997, combining to make HD Sports, as it is now known.

In October 2014, HD Sports was bought by a US-based private investor group based in Boston, Massachusetts for an undisclosed sum. The new owner plans to keep all manufacturing, research and development in Sheffield.

== Figure skaters competing on John Wilson blades ==
John Wilson sponsors many skaters. In December 2014, Gracie Gold was named as John Wilson's official spear head for its marketing campaign, signing a two-year deal.

- Jeremy Abbott – Gold Seal
- Gracie Gold – Pattern 99
- Yuzuru Hanyu – Pattern 99 Revolution
- Yuna Kim
- Evgenia Medvedeva – Gold Seal
- Kimmie Meissner – Pattern 99
- Elena Radionova – Gold Seal
- Denis Ten – Pattern 99
- Ashley Wagner – Pattern 99
