= Hanumankind =

Indian rapper (born 1992)

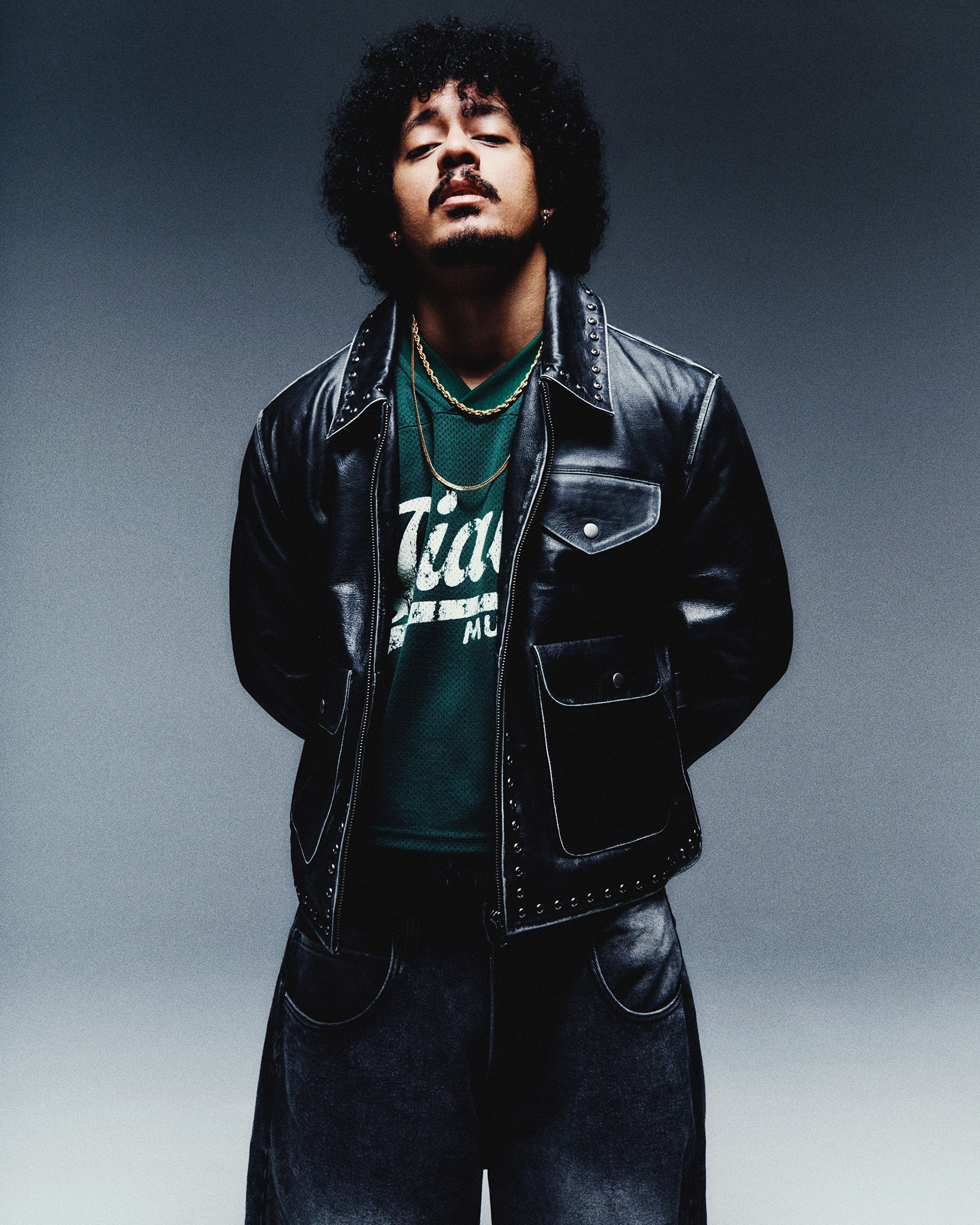
- Hanumankind in 2025

Background information
- Also known as: H.M.K
- Born: Sooraj Cherukat; October 17, 1992 (age 34); Malappuram, Kerala, India
- Occupations: Rapper; singer; songwriter; actor
- Years active: 2018–present
- Musical career
- Origin: Kerala, India
- Genres: Hip hop; R&B
- Labels: Def Jam India; Universal; Think; Capitol

Sooraj Cherukat (born October 17, 1992), known professionally as Hanumankind, is a rapper, singer, songwriter, and actor from Kerala, India. He released his first single "Daily Dose" from his debut EP Kalari in 2019. He received mainstream popularity in India and internationally with his track "Big Dawgs", which features the Hyderabad-based artist and producer Kalmi and American rapper ASAP Rocky on its remix. He acted in the 2024 Malayalam film, Rifle Club, directed by Aashiq Abu.

== Early life and education ==
Sooraj Cherukat was born on October 17 1992, in the city of Malappuram in Kerala, India. His father worked in the oil industry and the family moved frequently. As a child, Cherukat lived in Nigeria, Saudi Arabia, Dubai, Egypt, Qatar, and Italy before settling in Houston, Texas, United States, when he was in second grade. He attended Houston Community College in 2011. In 2012, he returned to India, enrolling at PSG College in Coimbatore, Tamil Nadu, to pursue a degree in business administration. He worked at Goldman Sachs in 2014, and also as a personal trainer.

== Music career ==
=== 2018–2023: Career beginnings ===
Cherukat officially began his career as a professional rapper by performing at NH7 Weekender, which is held in multiple cities and releasing his debut EP Kalari, in 2019. Before the release of Kalari, he had released a mixtape consisting of him rapping on YouTube beats, called the 959 Mixtape on Soundcloud and a single "Super Mario", where he rapped over a beat which sampled the video game Super Mario's soundtrack in 2018. The name Hanumankind is a portmanteau of the Hindu deity Hanuman and "mankind".

Cherukat released his sophomore EP, Surface Level, in 2020, which was succeeded by the release of some singles, such as "DAMNSON", "Go To Sleep", as well as collaborations, like "THAT'S A FACT" and "Enemies" with Yashraj.

He collaborated with Charan Raj and Sanjith Hegde for the song "Maadeva" featuring on the Kannada movie Popcorn Monkey Tiger. His 2021 single, "Genghis", focuses on themes of police brutality and social commentary.

=== 2024-present: Breakthrough with "Big Dawgs" and debut mixtape ===
His song "The Last Dance" is featured on the official soundtrack for the Malayalam-language film Aavesham.

He was featured in Rolling Stone India's first edition of the "Future of Music" list in March 2024. He gained widespread recognition both with the release of the single and its music video "Big Dawgs", featuring Kalmi, in July 2024. The accompanying music video directed by Bijoy Shetty, features Cherukat performing in a classic carnival attraction with motorcycles known as the well of death. The video was shot in Ponnani, his hometown district in Kerala, India.

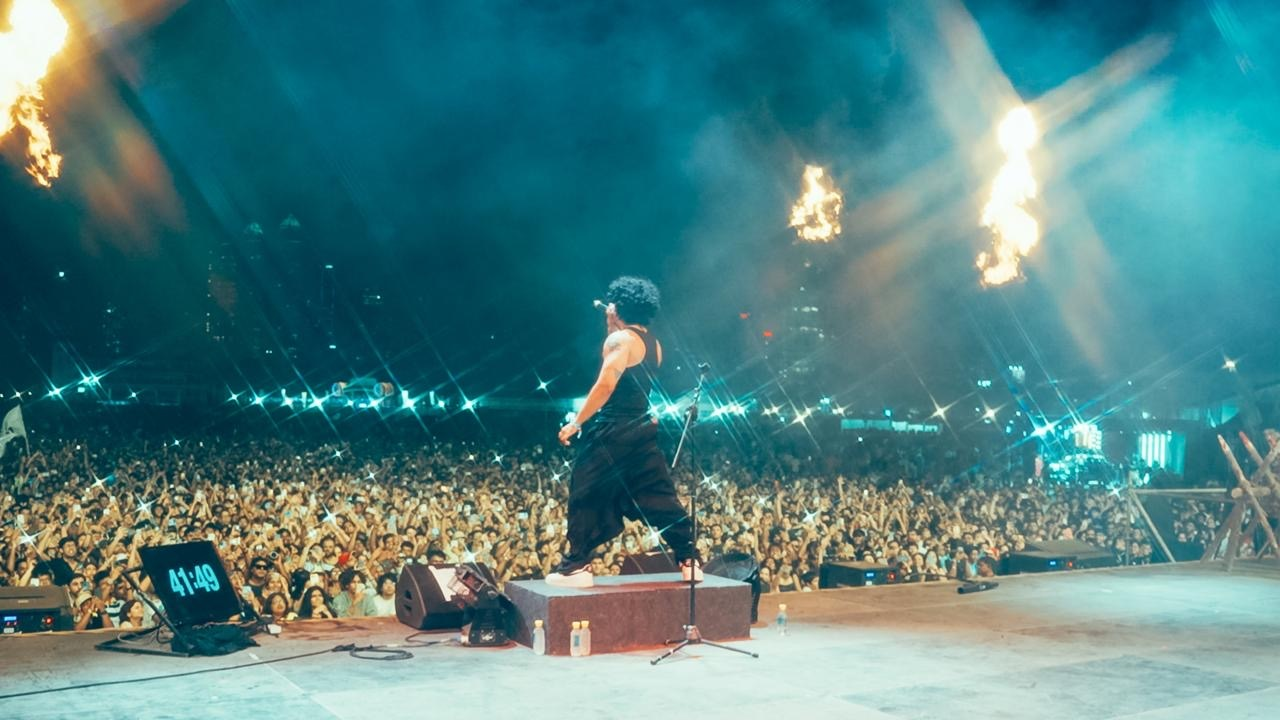
Hanumankind performing in 2024.

He also acted in the 2024 Malayalam film, Rifle Club, directed by Aashiq Abu. In 2025, he released his song "Run It Up", which features chenda drums in its instrumental, and performed the song at Netflix's 2025 Tudum event. He performed the single "Holiday" on the Colors Show and headlined the "OTW Tour" in support of his debut mixtape, Monsoon Season, in the summer of 2025. On July 17, 2025, before his debut mixtape release, Cherukat was featured on "Victory Lap Three" by Skepta, Fred Again, and PlaqueBoyMax. Monsoon Season released on July 25, 2025, featuring guest appearances from Denzel Curry, Roisee, ASAP Rocky, Rudy Mukta and Maxo Kream and production from longtime collaborators Parimal Shais and Kalmi. On November 22, 2025, Cherukat made his second appearance at Rolling Loud in his home country, India, where he performed alongside other notable names within the music scene and industry; it was also his first headlining Rolling Loud performance.

Hanumankind collaborated with Indian composer Shashwat Sachdev for the soundtrack of the 2025 Hindi film Dhurandhar, on which he was featured on two tracks, "Dhurandhar (Title Track)" alongside Jasmine Sandlas and Sudhir Yaduvanshi, and "Ez-Ez" alongside Diljit Dosanjh.

He also collaborated with Indian composer Anirudh Ravichander for Thalapathy Vijay's final movie Jana Nayagan which was released in 2026. He featured in the song 'The True Leader'.

In April 2026, it was announced that Hanumankind would contribute to the soundtrack of the second season of the Netflix animated series Devil May Cry, entitled "See U in Hell" alongside Papa Roach, which released on May 7. In the same month, he was featured in GQ India's list of "Most Influential Young Indians of 2026". During the 2026 Delhi Jantar Mantar protests, he joined the Sansad Chalo March to show his solidarity with the protestors and their cause.

== Artistry ==
While living in Houston, Cherukat was exposed to Southern hip hop and listened to artists like Chamillionaire, Three 6 Mafia, Project Pat, UGK, and DJ Screw. He is also a fan of System of a Down. His musical style is significantly influenced by Kendrick Lamar, J. Cole, and Logic.

== Personal life ==
As of July 2025, Cherukat lives in Bengaluru.

== Discography ==
=== Mixtapes ===
Title	Details
Monsoon Season	Released: 25 July 2025; Label: Capitol, Def Jam India, SLDM; Formats: Digital download, streaming

=== Extended plays ===
Title	Details
Kalari	Released: 27 December 2019; Label: Monopoly; Formats: Digital download, streaming
Surface Level	Released: 2 October 2020; Label: The Illage, Create Music Group; Formats: Digital download, streaming

=== Singles ===
List of singles, with selected peak chart positions
Title	Year	Peak chart positions										Certifications	Album
Title	Year	IND	AUS	CAN	GER	IRE	NZ	SWI	UK	US	WW	Certifications	Album
"Super Mario"	2018	—	—	—	—	—	—	—	—	—	—		Non-album single
"Daily Dose"	2019	—	—	—	—	—	—	—	—	—	—		Kalari
"S.L.A.B"	2020	—	—	—	—	—	—	—	—	—	—		Non-album single
"Options"	2020	—	—	—	—	—	—	—	—	—	—		Non-album single
"Beer and Biryani"	2020	—	—	—	—	—	—	—	—	—	—		Non-album single
"Genghis"	2021	—	—	—	—	—	—	—	—	—	—		Non-album single
"Damnson"	2021	—	—	—	—	—	—	—	—	—	—		Non-album single
"Skyline"	2021	—	—	—	—	—	—	—	—	—	—		Non-album single
"Lola's Chant" (with Kalmi)	2022	—	—	—	—	—	—	—	—	—	—		Non-album single
"Third Eye Freeverse (Red Bull 64 Bars)"	2022	—	—	—	—	—	—	—	—	—	—		Non-album single
"Go To Sleep"	2023	—	—	—	—	—	—	—	—	—	—		Non-album single
"Ayyayyo"	2023	—	—	—	—	—	—	—	—	—	—		Non-album single
"Big Dawgs" (with Kalmi, remixed by ASAP Rocky)	2024	3	9	9	11	30	2	9	15	23	9	BPI: Silver; MC: 3× Platinum; RMNZ: Gold	Monsoon Season
"Run It Up" (with Kalmi)	2025	—	—	—	—	—	— (Note: "Run It Up" did not enter the NZ Top 40 Singles Chart, but peaked at number 24 on the NZ Hot Singles Chart.)	—	—	—	—		Monsoon Season
"Holiday"	2025	—	—	—	—	—	—	—	—	—	—		Monsoon Season
"Villainous Freestyle"	2025	—	—	—	—	—	—	—	—	—	—		Monsoon Season

=== Guest appearances ===
Title	Year	Album
Tangents (Arshaq Malik, 47K ft. Hanumankind)	2019	Joint Custody
Pharmaceutical (Parimal Shais ft. Hanumankind)	2019	Kumari Kandam Traps, Vol.1
9 (Lojal ft. Hanumankind)	2020	Phase
Namma Stories (Arivu, SIRI, Hanumankind, NJ, Kartik Shah)	2021	Non-album single
THAT'S A FACT (Yashraj, Hanumankind)	2023	Ladke Convict
Enemies (KSHMR, Yashraj, Hanumankind)	2023	Karam
Victory Lap Five (Fred Again, Skepta, PlaqueBoyMax, Denzel Curry, That Mexican OT, Hanumankind, D Double E, LYNY)	2025	USB
Don't Look Down (Ed Sheeran, Hanumankind, Dhee, Santhosh Narayanan)	2025	Play (The Remixes)
Tequila Dance (DIVINE, Hanumankind)	2025	Walking on Water
Life Be Lifing (Project Pat, Juicy J, Hanumankind)	2026	Dem Goats
Dead and Alive (Luke 15:32) (Recoechi, Hanumankind)	2026	Act 2: Body of God

=== Soundtracks ===
List of Soundtracks
Year	Film	Song	Performer(s)	Composer(s)	Ref.
2020	Popcorn Monkey Tiger	"Maadeva"	Charan Raj, Hanumankind, Sanjith Hegde	Charan Raj	
2023	Kuttey	"Ek Aur Dhan Te Nan"	Jyoti Nooran, Hanumankind	Vishal Bhardwaj, Gulzar, Hanumankind	
2024	Aavesham	"The Last Dance"	Hanumankind	Sushin Shyam	
2024	Squid Game	"The Game Don't Stop"	Hanumankind	Hanumankind, Kalmi, Parimal Shais	
2025	Dhurandhar	"Dhurandhar Title Track"	Hanumankind, Jasmine Sandlas, Shashwat Sachdev	Shashwat Sachdev, Charanjit Ahuja	
2025	Dhurandhar	"Ez-Ez"	Hanumankind, Diljit Dosanjh	Shashwat Sachdev, Raj Ranjodh, Hanumankind	
2026	Devil May Cry	"See U in Hell"	Hanumankind, Papa Roach	Jacoby Shaddix, Hanumankind	

=== Promotional singles ===
Year	Song	Performer(s)	Composer(s)	Promoting	Ref.
2026	"Taste the Thunder"	Vishal Dadlani, Hanumankind	Sushin Shyam	Thums Up	

== Filmography ==
As actor
Year	Film	Role	Language	Notes	Ref.
2024	Por	Student	Tamil	Guest appearance	
2024	Rifle Club	Bheera Bare	Malayalam		
