= Dandelions (song) =

- "Slowed + reverb" version cover

Promotional single by Ruth B.

from the album Safe Haven
- Released: April 28, 2017
- Genre: Contemporary R&B
- Length: 3:53
- Label: Columbia; Sony
- Songwriter: Ruth Berhe
- Producer: Joel Little

"Dandelions" is a song by Canadian singer Ruth B., originally released as a promotional single from her 2017 album Safe Haven. It was re-issued separately in a "slowed + reverb" version in August 2021. In 2022, the song charted internationally after going viral on TikTok.

== Background ==
Ruth B. called the track "probably the lightest and cutest song" on Safe Haven and said she started writing it after watching an interview with Sia, part of whose advice on songwriting was to choose a "pretty word" to "write around". Ruth B. then "look[ed] out the window" several weeks later and "saw a dandelion, and [...] started writing the song" in part because she thought "dandelion" was a "pretty word".

== Charts ==
=== Weekly charts ===
Weekly chart performance for "Dandelions"
Chart (2022)	Peak position
Australia (ARIA)	53
Canada Hot 100 (Billboard)	58
Global 200 (Billboard)	51
Greece International (IFPI Greece)	62
India International (IMI)	1
Ireland (IRMA)	80
Malaysia (RIM)	6
Netherlands (Single Top 100)	100
Philippines (Billboard)	16
Portugal (AFP)	63
Singapore (RIAS)	4
South Africa Streaming (TOSAC)	71
Sweden (Sverigetopplistan)	100
Switzerland (Schweizer Hitparade)	80
UK Singles (OCC)	42
US Bubbling Under Hot 100 (Billboard)	9
US Adult Contemporary (Billboard)	28
US Adult Pop Airplay (Billboard)	28

=== Year-end charts ===
2022 year-end chart performance for "Dandelions"
Chart (2022)	Position
Global 200 (Billboard)	69

2023 year-end chart performance for "Dandelions"
Chart (2023)	Position
Global 200 (Billboard)	136

== Certifications ==
Certifications for "Dandelions"
Region	Certification	Certified units/sales
Denmark (IFPI Danmark)	Platinum	90,000^{‡}
France (SNEP)	Platinum	200,000^{‡}
Germany (BVMI)	Gold	200,000^{‡}
Italy (FIMI)	Gold	50,000^{‡}
New Zealand (RMNZ)	3× Platinum	90,000^{‡}
Poland (ZPAV)	Platinum	50,000^{‡}
Portugal (AFP)	2× Platinum	20,000^{‡}
Spain (Promusicae)	Platinum	60,000^{‡}
United Kingdom (BPI)	2× Platinum	1,200,000^{‡}
United States (RIAA)	3× Platinum	3,000,000^{‡}
Streaming
Greece (IFPI Greece)	Gold	1,000,000^{†}
^{‡} Sales+streaming figures based on certification alone.^{†} Streaming-only figures based on certification alone.

== Release history ==
Release history and formats for "Dandelions"
Region	Date	Version	Format	Label	Ref.
Various	April 28, 2017	Original	Digital download; streaming	Columbia; Sony	
Various	August 27, 2021	Slowed + reverb	Digital download; streaming	Columbia; Sony	
