= Safe Haven (album) =

Studio album by Ruth B
- Released: May 5, 2017
- Length: 46:32
- Label: Columbia
- Producer: Joel Little; Mike Elizondo; Ruth Berhe

Ruth B chronology
The Intro (2015)	Safe Haven (2017)	Maybe I'll Find You Again (2019)

Singles from Safe Haven
- 1. "Superficial Love" Released: February 24, 2017

Safe Haven is the debut studio album by Canadian singer-songwriter Ruth B. Released on May 5, 2017, the album has been certified gold by Music Canada. Two of the songs from her debut extended play (EP), The Intro, are included in the album. Those are "Lost Boy" and "Superficial Love", though the production for "Superficial Love" is different from that of the EP. The album was produced by Joel Little, Mike Elizondo and Ruth Berhe.

== Background ==
In a 2017 interview, Ruth B stated: "I have put the last couple years of my life into this album. My memories and stories all make appearances in the melodies and hooks. My greatest hope is that these songs will resonate with listeners and find homes in their hearts". With producer Joel Little, she began recording the album in 2016 after the success of her debut EP, The Intro. Little remarked that he became interested in working with Ruth B. after an acquaintance sent him some of her songs. "She had this phenomenal catalogue," he said, and compared her vocal style favorably with Lorde's. Ruth B produced the album's tracks with him, including Mike Elizondo.

== Release ==
On November 11, 2016, the first promotional single "In My Dreams" was released, alongside a lyric video. "If This Is Love" followed on April 20, 2017, as the second promotional single with the accompanying lyric video and a live performance of the song. "Dandelions", the third promotional single, was released a week later. Safe Haven was released on the CD, vinyl LP, and MP3 formats on May 5, via Columbia Records.

== Critical reception ==
Professional ratings
Review scores
Source	Rating
Music Connection	8/10

Jonathan Widran of Music Connection wrote that the album is a perfect showcase for her "soulful and dusky voice", and that the ballads and more uptempo songs are balanced perfectly.

== Track listing ==
All tracks were written by Ruth B and produced by Joel Little, except where noted.

Safe Haven track listing
No.	Title	Producer(s)	Length
1.	"Mixed Signals"		4:15
2.	"Dandelions"		3:54
3.	"Unrighteous"		4:01
4.	"Superficial Love"	Mike Elizondo	3:39
5.	"If This Is Love"		3:50
6.	"Lost Boy"	Ruth B	4:36
7.	"Young"		3:45
8.	"If by Chance"		5:04
9.	"World War 3"		3:55
10.	"Safe Haven"		3:24
11.	"In My Dreams"		4:09
12.	"First Time"		3:17
Total length:			46:32

== Charts ==
2017 weekly chart performance
Chart (2017)	Peak position
Canadian Albums (Billboard)	17
US Heatseekers Albums (Billboard)	13

2025 weekly chart performance
Chart (2025)	Peak position
Nigerian Albums (TurnTable)	66

== Certifications ==
Region	Certification	Certified units/sales
Canada (Music Canada)	Gold	40,000^{‡}
Denmark (IFPI Danmark)	Gold	10,000^{‡}
New Zealand (RMNZ)	Platinum	15,000^{‡}
Poland (ZPAV)	Gold	10,000^{‡}
United States (RIAA)	Platinum	1,000,000^{‡}
^{‡} Sales+streaming figures based on certification alone.
