= PlaqueBoyMax =

American online streamer and rapper (born 2003)

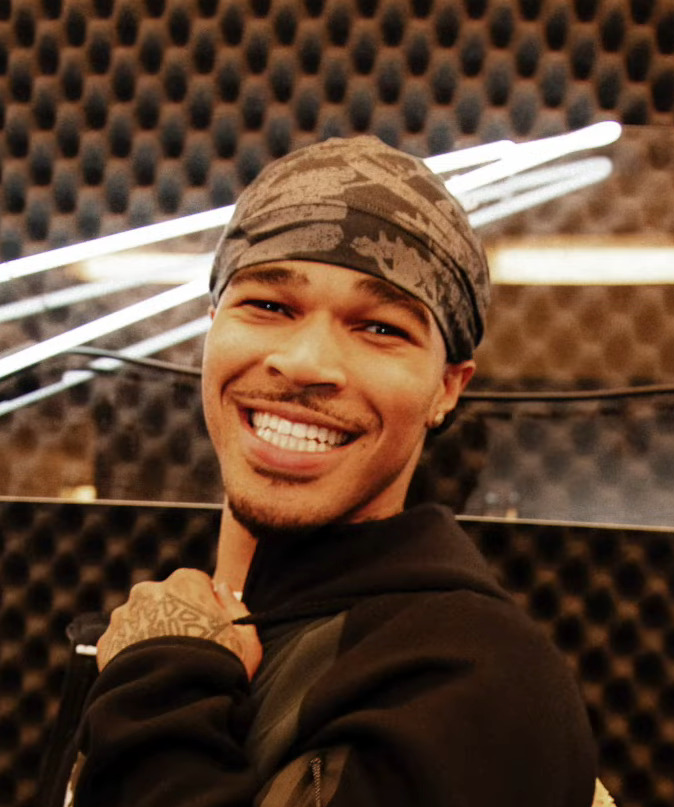
- Dent in 2025
- Born: Maxwell Elliot Dent; April 3, 2003 (age 23); West Orange, New Jersey, U.S.
- Education: West Orange High School
- Occupations: Online streamer; record producer; rapper

Twitch information
- Channel: PlaqueBoyMax
- Years active: 2021–present
- Genres: Just Chatting, Music
- Followers: 2.2 million

YouTube information
- Channel: PlaqueBoyMax
- Subscribers: 1.8 million
- Views: 345.3 million
- Musical career
- Genres: Hip hop; trap; rage
- Labels: 5$TAR; Field Trip; Capitol
- Last updated: June 24, 2026

Maxwell Elliot Dent (born April 3, 2003), known professionally and online as PlaqueBoyMax, is an American online streamer, record producer, and rapper.

He began his streaming career on Twitch in 2021 but did not gain mainstream attention until April 2024 following his joining of the esports and entertainment organization FaZe Clan.

As a rapper, he is currently signed to Field Trip Recordings and released his debut solo mixtape Five Forever in May 2025. He has also released four extended plays (EP). He has been credited with popularizing the UK underground rap scene among American audiences by collaborating with members of the scene on his livestreams.

== Early life ==
Maxwell Elliot Dent was born on April 3, 2003 in West Orange, New Jersey, and is the second of three children born to Keith and Priscilla Dent. He has an older sister named Olivia and a younger brother named Nicholas.

Dent graduated in 2021 from West Orange High School, where he played on the varsity basketball team. He took a gap year after graduation to pursue live-streaming full-time, creating a Google Slides presentation to convince his parents to allow him to do so. He is a Christian.

== Career ==
=== 2019–2021: Basement Boyz ===
While in high school, Dent was the editor and featured in videos for the Basement Boyz, a YouTube channel formed by him and his friends. Videos they posted included pranks and rap-related content. The channel reached nearly 200,000 subscribers before the group disbanded.

=== 2021–2023: Initial popularity ===
In April 2021, Dent created his Twitch account under the moniker PlaqueBoyMax, inspired by YouTube Creator Awards, otherwise known as plaques. His live-streamed content initially consisted of reaction videos, community events via Discord, and gaming. During this time, Dent began to host shows such as Song Wars, where artists would send music that would be ranked in a tournament.

Around this period, Dent formed the 5$TAR collective, which included artists and friends who frequently participated in his streams and Song Wars competitions. Members of the group included gawsxo, Skreet2x, Wayne Almighty, NIKOWOODYEAR, and YoungDabo. The collective collaborated regularly on streams and hosted competitive events.

=== 2024: FaZe Clan and In The Booth ===
In May 2024, Dent was added to FaZe Clan following a revamp of the organization. Shortly afterwards, he began his In The Booth series of streams, in which he invites artists to create songs to be engineered by him and uploaded to streaming services. Songs such as "Laced Max" by Lazer Dim 700 and "Pink Dreads" by DDG gained popularity, boosting the profiles of the artists and Dent. Dent developed a reputation as a notable promoter in hip hop as a result of his streaming presence.

=== 2025: Departure from FaZe Clan and EPs ===
On January 24, Dent reached his second-highest concurrent view-count of over 127,000 viewers during a stream with Central Cee. In March, American actor and rapper Will Smith appeared on Max's stream to promote his album Based on a True Story.

On March 20, Dent independently released the EP London, which included songs recorded on-stream in the aforementioned city with Nemzzz, Skepta, Lancey Foux, YT, and Len. On May 23, Dent released the EP Atlanta through Field Trip Recordings, which included contributions from Quavo, DJ Drama, Tana, 1300Saint, ApolloRed1, Flo Milli, Lazer Dim 700, and Hardrock. A week later, his debut solo mixtape, Five Forever, was released.

In June 2025, Dent released "Victory Lap", in collaboration with Fred Again and Skepta. It was later nominated for Best Dance/Electronic Recording at the 68th Annual Grammy Awards.

On August 5, Dent announced his departure from FaZe Clan to focus on his own brand, 5$TAR.

On September 15, Dent was hospitalized for an undisclosed health condition, which was later revealed to be an infection caused from the lack of proper care for his recent tattoos. Dent took a three-week hiatus from streaming due to the illness.

On October 24, 2025 Dent, Rakai, and BunnaB released the track "Turn Up". On October 26, 2025 Dent, Young Dabo, Che, and Xaviersobased met at ComplexCon 2025 to record their track "Motto". On December 5, 2025 Dent released his third EP, Too Much Music.

=== 2026-present: EP releases, focus on album, Streamer University ===
On May 1, 2026, he released his fourth EP, Crash Dummy. On Complex's "Hip Hop Media Power Ranking: The 2026 Edition", Dent was ranked at #10 out of #35.

In July 2026, Dent participated as a student in the second installment of Kai Cenat's Streamer University creator bootcamp. He was officially announced as part of the 2026 class alongside other notable creators like DreamDoll and JasonTheWeen. During the multi-day live-streamed event, Dent was involved in a viral roommate dispute with TikTok creator WardrobeWinter that was ultimately mediated on-stream by fellow creator Josh "YourRAGE" Thurmond. Dent was also involved in a conflict with streamer Ojay Suave after Suave heavily criticized Dent's sexuality and fashion style, stating that Dent needed "a church bath" and referred to him as a "demon". Dent later clarified that he was "a straight man who likes to wear wigs". Several creators attending the event defended Dent and confronted Suave over the remarks.

== Discography ==
=== Mixtapes ===
List of mixtapes, with selected details
Title	Album details
Five Forever	Released: May 30, 2025; Label: 5$TAR, Field Trip, Capitol; Format: Digital download, streaming

=== Extended plays ===
List of extended plays, with selected details
Title	Album details
London	Released: March 20, 2025; Label: Self-released; Format: Digital download, streaming
Atlanta	Released: May 23, 2025; Label: 5$TAR, Field Trip, Capitol; Format: Digital download, streaming
Too Much Music	Released: December 5, 2025; Label: 5$TAR, Field Trip, Capitol; Format: Digital download, streaming
Crash Dummy	Released: May 1, 2026; Label: 5$TAR, Field Trip, Capitol; Format: Digital download, streaming

=== Singles ===
List of singles, with selected chart positions and certifications
Title	Year	Peak chart positions							Certifications
Title	Year	US Bub.	US R&B/HH	AUS	CAN	IRE	UK	WW	Certifications
"Rino Hercules" (with Summrs)	2024	—	—	—	—	—	—	—	
"Pink Dreads" (with DDG)	2024	10	46	—	—	—	—	—	
"InTheJ" (with D. Savage)	2025	—	—	—	—	—	—	—	
"Man of the Year" (with UnoTheActivist)	2025	—	—	—	—	—	—	—	
"YN" (with Sexyy Red, BabyChiefDoit, and Lazer Dim 700)	2025	—	—	—	—	—	—	—	
"4 Doors" (featuring 41, Bay Swag, and D Lou)	2025	—	—	—	—	—	—	—	
"Victory Lap" (with Fred again... and Skepta)	2025	—	—	3	75	14	4	112	BPI: Platinum; ARIA: 2× Platinum; RMNZ: 2× Platinum
"Yea Yea/5Star" (featuring Rob49 and Veeze)	2025	—	—	—	—	—	—	—	
"No Dreads" (with DDG)	2025	—	—	—	—	—	—	—	
"Turn Up" (with Rakai and BunnaB)	2025	—	—	—	—	—	—	—	
"Oasis"	2025	—	—	—	—	—	—	—	
"Wyd" (featuring Bryson Tiller)	2026	—	—	—	—	—	—	—	
"Thong Song"	2026	—	—	—	—	—	—	—	
"Diva"	2026	—	—	—	—	—	—	—	
"1v1" (with Slayr)	2026	—	—	—	—	—	—	—	

== Awards and nominations ==
Awards and nominations for PlaqueBoyMax
Year	Ceremony	Category	Work	Result	Ref.
2023	The Streamer Awards	Best Breakthrough Streamer	Himself	Nominated	
2024	The Streamer Awards	Best Creative Arts Streamer	Himself	Won	
2025	The Streamer Awards	Best Music Streamer	Himself	Won	
2025	The Streamer Awards	Best Streamed Collab	Fred Again and Himself	Nominated	
2025	The Streamer Awards	Best Streamed Series	In The Booth	Won	
2025	The Streamer Awards	Streamer of the Year	Himself	Nominated	
2026	The Streamer Awards	Best Music Streamer	Himself	Nominated	
2026	Grammy Awards	Best Dance/Electronic Recording	"Victory Lap" (with Fred Again and Skepta)	Nominated	
2026	Brit Awards	Song Of The Year	"Victory Lap" (with Fred Again and Skepta)	Nominated	
2026	Brit Awards	Best Dance Act	Fred Again, Skepta & Himself	Won	
2026	MOBO Awards	Song Of The Year	"Victory Lap" (with Fred Again and Skepta)	Nominated	
2026	Billboard	Disruptor Award	Himself	Won	
