= Ruth B. =

Canadian singer and songwriter (born 1995)

Ruth B
- Born: Ruth Berhe; July 2, 1995 (age 31); Edmonton, Alberta, Canada
- Occupations: Singer; songwriter
- Instruments: Vocals; piano
- Years active: 2013–present
- Labels: Columbia; REB Music Productions; Downtown
- Website: ruthbofficial.com

Ruth Berhe (born July 2, 1995) is a Canadian singer and songwriter from Edmonton, Alberta. She started by singing songs on Vine in early 2013. In November 2015, she released her debut extended play (EP), The Intro. On May 5, 2017, she released her debut studio album, Safe Haven. It has gathered over 2.5 billion overall streams globally as of June 2024. Her double-platinum single "Lost Boy" has accumulated over 850 million streams on Spotify.

In 2022, her song "Dandelions" from Safe Haven became a sleeper hit, when it grew in popularity due to TikTok and charted internationally, including chart debuts in India, Indonesia, Malaysia, Brazil, and Germany. It has accumulated over 2 billions streams on Spotify alone.

== Early life and education ==
Ruth Berhe was born on July 2, 1995, and raised in Edmonton, Alberta. Her parents emigrated from Ethiopia in the 1980s. At the age of eight, Berhe began playing the piano. Berhe speaks her parents' native language Amharic fluently. She spent some of her teenage years working at a local Reitmans clothing store and described herself in an interview with The Canadian Press as an "introvert". She said she was "never the big party chick." While working part-time she started posting videos on Vine. She says she chose the six-second video service because it took less effort to upload short clips, compared to other popular services like YouTube.

Berhe graduated from Ross Sheppard High School in 2013. She attended MacEwan University, but took time off her studies to focus on music.

== Career ==
=== 2013–2018: Debut and Safe Haven ===
Berhe posted her first Vine video in May 2013, and started making singing Vines about a year later. Her singing Vines, typically six second covers of popular songs, helped her grow a following. In November 2014, she posted a Vine of herself singing a line that she had made up, which was inspired by the television series Once Upon a Time. It garnered around 84,000 likes within a week, which was unusual for her at the time. She took note of its popularity, with some of her followers commenting that she should make it into a full song. It became "Lost Boy", which she shared to YouTube on January 18, 2015. The song "Superficial Love" was featured on her debut EP The Intro later that year and on her 2017 debut album Safe Haven, which also included the song "Dandelions".

In September 2017, she performed Neil Young's "Heart of Gold" for Bryan Adams's induction into the Canadian Songwriters Hall of Fame. The CBC Kids television series Addison debuted in 2018, with a theme song performed by Ruth B. In May, her song "Shadows" appeared in the second season of the Netflix series Dear White People.

=== 2019–present: Subsequent releases ===
In 2019, Ruth B released an EP called Maybe I'll Find You Again, which includes the song "Slow Fade" that she co-wrote with the British alternative group, Oh Wonder. In the summer of 2020, she released the song "If I Have a Son" as a response to the George Floyd Murder in Minneapolis. "Dirty Nikes" was the first single released from her then upcoming second studio album. On December 3, she performed a virtual concert representing the MusicCares Foundation to raise money during the COVID-19 pandemic.

In 2021, her second album, Moments in Between was released. In August 2022, her song "Paper Airplanes" was featured as the leading original song for the Tyler Perry Netflix film, A Jazzman's Blues soundtrack.

== Artistry ==
Incorporating elements of pop, R&B, alternative, and soul, Ruth B has listed Lauryn Hill, The Beatles, Carole King, Grouplove, Adele, Taylor Swift and Ed Sheeran as some of her musical influences. She said that "the one thing all my favourite artists have in common is they are all storytellers. Something that I try to incorporate in my music", in an interview with Idolator.

== Discography ==
=== Studio albums ===
Title	Album details	Peak chart positions	Certifications
Title	Album details	CAN	Certifications
Safe Haven	Released: May 5, 2017; Label: Columbia; Formats: CD, digital download, vinyl	17	MC: Gold; RIAA: Platinum
Moments in Between	Released: June 11, 2021; Label: Reb Music Productions, Downtown Records; Formats: Digital download, streaming	—	
Peace to Make	Released: August 21, 2026; Label: Reb Music Productions, Alter; Formats: Digital download, streaming	TBA	

=== EPs ===
Title	Extended play details	Peak chart positions		Certifications
Title	Extended play details	CAN	US	Certifications
The Intro	Released: November 27, 2015; Label: Columbia; Formats: CD, digital download	20	52	MC: Gold
Maybe I'll Find You Again	Released: March 22, 2019; Label: Columbia; Formats: Digital download, streaming	—	—	

=== Singles ===
==== As lead artist ====
Title	Year	Peak chart positions							Certifications	Album
Title	Year	CAN	DEN	IRE	NLD	SWE	UK	US	Certifications	Album
"Lost Boy"	2015	14	14	89	41	19	97	24	MC: 6× Platinum; BPI: Platinum; IFPI DEN: 3× Platinum; IFPI SWE: 3× Platinum; NVPI: Platinum; RIAA: 4× Platinum	The Intro and Safe Haven
"Superficial Love"	2017	— (Note: "Superficial Love" did not chart on the Canadian Hot 100, though did peak at number 44 on the CHR/Top 40 chart.)	—	—	—	—	—	—	MC: Gold; RIAA: Gold	The Intro and Safe Haven
"Rare"	2018	—	—	—	—	—	—	—		Maybe I'll Find You Again
"Slow Fade"	2019	—	—	—	—	—	—	—		Maybe I'll Find You Again
"Dirty Nikes"	2020	—	—	—	—	—	—	—		Moments in Between
"Situation"	2021	—	—	—	—	—	—	—		Moments in Between
"28" (with Dean Lewis)	2023	—	—	—	—	—	—	—		Non-album single
"Storm"	2025	—	—	—	—	—	—	—		Non-album single
"Bad Combination"	2026	—	—	—	—	—	—	—		Peace to Make
"Didn't I"	2026	—	—	—	—	—	—	—		Peace to Make
"Best Days"	2026	—	—	—	—	—	—	—		Peace to Make
"Clocks"	2026	—	—	—	—	—	—	—		

==== Promotional singles ====
Title	Year	Peak chart positions										Certifications	Album
Title	Year	CAN	AUS	IRE	MYS	NLD	SGP	SWI	UK	US Bub.	WW	Certifications	Album
"In My Dreams"	2016	—	—	—	—	—	—	—	—	—	—		Safe Haven
"If This Is Love"	2017	—	—	—	—	—	—	—	—	—	—		Safe Haven
"Dandelions"	2017	58	53	80	10	100	9	90	42	9	51	BPI: 2× Platinum; RIAA: 2× Platinum	Safe Haven
"Crave"	2018	—	—	—	—	—	—	—	—	—	—		Maybe I'll Find You Again
"If I Have a Son"	2020	—	—	—	—	—	—	—	—	—	—		Non-album single
"Die Fast"	2021	—	—	—	—	—	—	—	—	—	—		Moments in Between

== Awards and nominations ==
Ruth B was nominated for the Juno Fan Choice Award and Songwriter of the Year, and won Breakthrough Artist of the Year at the 2017 Juno Awards. In June 2017, she honoured National Arts Centre Award winner Michael Bublé at the Governor General's Performing Arts Awards gala by performing his song "Home" as well as Adams's "Heaven" during his induction for the Lifetime Achievement Award at the SOCAN Awards. At the 2018 Juno Awards, she was nominated for three awards including Artist of the Year, Album of the Year, and Pop Album of the Year.

Year	Award	Category	Work	Result
2016	Shorty Awards	Best Vine Musician	Herself	Nominated
2016	iHeartRadio Much Music Video Awards	Fan Fave Vine Musician	Herself	Nominated
2016	Teen Choice Awards	Next Big Thing	Herself	Nominated
2016	BET Awards	BET FANdemonium Award	Herself	Nominated
2017	Juno Awards	Juno Fan Choice Award	Herself	Nominated
2017	Juno Awards	Breakthrough Artist of the Year	Herself	Won
2017	Juno Awards	Songwriter of the Year	Herself — •"Lost Boy" •"Superficial Love" •"2 Poor Kids"	Nominated
2017	Canadian Radio Music Awards	Best New Group or Solo Artist: Hot AC	"Lost Boy"	Won
2017	Canadian Radio Music Awards	Best New Group or Solo Artist: Mainstream AC	"Lost Boy"	Nominated
2017	Canadian Radio Music Awards	Best New Group or Solo Artist: CHR	"Lost Boy"	Won
2017	Western Canadian Music Awards	Pop Artist of the Year	Herself	Nominated
2018	Juno Awards	Artist of the Year	Herself	Nominated
2018	Juno Awards	Album of the Year	Safe Haven	Nominated
2018	Juno Awards	Pop Album of the Year	Safe Haven	Nominated
2023	Black Reel Awards	Outstanding Original Song	"Paper Airplanes"	Nominated
