= The Intro (EP) =

EP by Ruth B
- Released: November 27, 2015
- Recorded: 2015
- Length: 16:26
- Label: Columbia
- Producer: Ruth B

Ruth B chronology
| The Intro (2015) | Safe Haven (2017) |

Singles from The Intro
- 1. "Lost Boy" Released: February 12, 2015

The Intro is the debut extended play (EP) by Canadian singer and songwriter Ruth B. Columbia Records released it on November 27, 2015. She recorded the EP at a studio located in Brooklyn for two days. Prior to the release of The Intro, Ruth B gained attention through her singing videos on Vine, which inspired her to write the EP's lead single "Lost Boy". Despite receiving little to no promotion, the single met commercial success and subsequently led to her signing a recording contract with Columbia Records.

== Background ==
Ruth B had initially gained popularity by posting six-second snippets of her singing on Vine; she was encouraged by her fans to write a full-length song, so she wrote "Lost Boy", which ended up being her first hit. The song entered the Top 100 of the iTunes chart without promotion, and she began receiving offers for recording contracts from various record labels. She signed to Columbia Records and shortly after began recording music for "The Intro." B stated in an interview with the Rookie magazine that being signed "felt really validating and cool that people in the business thought that [she] could do it, not just [her] friends and family."

== Writing and recording ==
Ruth B began writing music after being signed to her record label; she stated that she wanted to take an "honest, real, and vulnerable" approach when writing the music. Ruth B self-produced her entire EP, and three of the EP's songs ("Lost Boy", "Golden", and "2 Broke Kids") were written prior to Ruth B's signing to the record label; she wrote "Superficial Love" shortly after being signed. The EP was recorded in two days at a music studio in Brooklyn.

== Release ==
The Intro was released as an MP3 on 27 November 2015, and re-released on CD in 2016, following the success of "Lost Boy".

== Critical reception ==
Professional ratings
Review scores
| Source | Rating |
|---|---|
| AllMusic | 3/5 stars |

Andy Kellman, writing for AllMusic, calls the lyrics "elegant and direct" and concludes that the EP is "all aching love songs that are nonetheless comforting." The Diamondback admin viewed the EP's raw production as a strength and predicted that Ruth B would attract greater attention as her career continued to develop beyond her early popularity on Vine.

== Commercial performance ==
The Intro debuted at number 20 on the Canadian Albums Chart and number 52 on the US Billboard 200. It also reached number 7 on the Americana/Folk Albums chart.

== Track listing ==
All tracks are written by Ruth B.

Standard edition
| No. | Title | Length |
|---|---|---|
| 1. | "2 Poor Kids" | 3:47 |
| 2. | "Lost Boy" | 4:36 |
| 3. | "Golden" | 4:36 |
| 4. | "Superficial Love" | 3:26 |
| Total length: | | 16:26 |

== Charts ==
=== Weekly charts ===
| Chart (2015–2016) | Peak position |
|---|---|
| Canadian Albums (Billboard) | 20 |
| US Billboard 200 | 52 |
| US Americana/Folk Albums (Billboard) | 7 |

=== Year-end charts ===
| Chart (2016) | Position |
|---|---|
| US Billboard 200 | 166 |
