= Kalmi =

Indian music producer

- Born: Nikhil Kalimireddy
- Origin: Visakhapatnam, Andhra Pradesh, India
- Genres: Electronic; hip-hop
- Occupations: Music producer; DJ; songwriter
- Years active: 2013-present

Nikhil Kalimireddy, known professionally as Kalmi, is an Indian music producer and DJ based in Hyderabad. He is best known for his song "Big Dawgs" with rapper Hanumankind. It entered the Billboard Canadian Hot 100 chart at number 9 and peaked at number 23 on the Billboard Hot 100, marking an achievement for both artists.

== Early life ==
Kalimireddy was born in Hyderabad and attended an engineering college.

== Early career ==
Kalimireddy began taking music production seriously when he was in college, where he would start to engineer and produce tracks off of his mom's laptop. This, and a succession of his roommates with eclectic electronic music tastes opened him up to a world of new possibilities. They allowed him to draw on inspiration from pioneering artists like Flume and Odesza.

== Discography ==
=== Singles ===
Title	Year	Peak chart positions										Certifications	Album
Title	Year	IND	AUS	CAN	GER	IRE	NZ	SWI	UK	US	WW	Certifications	Album
"Lola's Chant" (with Hanumankind)	2022	—	—	—	—	—	—	—	—	—	—		Non-album singles
"Matha Garam" (with DG Immortals featuring Raga)	2024	—	—	—	—	—	—	—	—	—	—		Non-album singles
"Big Dawgs" (with Hanumankind, remixed by ASAP Rocky)	2024	3	9	9	11	30	2	9	15	23	9	BPI: Silver; MC: Platinum; RMNZ: Gold	Monsoon Season
"Love & Limerance" (with Rudy)	2025	—	—	—	—	—	—	—	—	—	—		Non-album single
