= List of number-one country albums of 2024 (Australia) =

ARIA Charts number-one country albums of 2024 < 2023 2025 >

Other Australian number-one charts of 2024
- albums
- singles
- urban singles
- dance singles
- club tracks
- digital tracks
- streaming tracks

Top Australian singles and albums of 2024
- Triple J Hottest 100
- top 25 singles
- top 25 albums

These are the Australian Country number-one albums of 2024, per the ARIA Charts.

== Chart history ==
Issue date	Album	Artist
1 January	Speak Now (Taylor's Version)	Taylor Swift
8 January	One Thing at a Time	Morgan Wallen
15 January	One Thing at a Time	Morgan Wallen
22 January	One Thing at a Time	Morgan Wallen
29 January	One Thing at a Time	Morgan Wallen
5 February	One Thing at a Time	Morgan Wallen
12 February	One Thing at a Time	Morgan Wallen
19 February	One Thing at a Time	Morgan Wallen
26 February	Red (Taylor's Version)	Taylor Swift
4 March	Red (Taylor's Version)	Taylor Swift
11 March	One Thing at a Time	Morgan Wallen
18 March	One Thing at a Time	Morgan Wallen
25 March	One Thing at a Time	Morgan Wallen
1 April	One Thing at a Time	Morgan Wallen
8 April	Cowboy Carter	Beyoncé
15 April	Cowboy Carter	Beyoncé
22 April	Cowboy Carter	Beyoncé
29 April	Cowboy Carter	Beyoncé
6 May	One Thing at a Time	Morgan Wallen
13 May	One Thing at a Time	Morgan Wallen
20 May	Between the Fires	Troy Cassar-Daley
27 May	One Thing at a Time	Morgan Wallen
3 June	One Thing at a Time	Morgan Wallen
10 June	One Thing at a Time	Morgan Wallen
17 June	One Thing at a Time	Morgan Wallen
24 June	Fathers & Sons	Luke Combs
1 July	One Thing at a Time	Morgan Wallen
8 July	One Thing at a Time	Morgan Wallen
15 July	The Great American Bar Scene	Zach Bryan
22 July	One Thing at a Time	Morgan Wallen
29 July	One Thing at a Time	Morgan Wallen
5 August	One Thing at a Time	Morgan Wallen
12 August	One Thing at a Time	Morgan Wallen
19 August	One Thing at a Time	Morgan Wallen
26 August	F-1 Trillion	Post Malone
2 September	F-1 Trillion	Post Malone
9 September	F-1 Trillion	Post Malone
16 September	F-1 Trillion	Post Malone
23 September	F-1 Trillion	Post Malone
30 September	High	Keith Urban
7 October	This One's for You	Luke Combs
14 October	Backbone	Kasey Chambers
21 October	One Thing at a Time	Morgan Wallen
28 October	One Thing at a Time	Morgan Wallen
4 November	One Thing at a Time	Morgan Wallen
11 November	One Thing at a Time	Morgan Wallen
18 November	One Thing at a Time	Morgan Wallen
25 November	One Thing at a Time	Morgan Wallen
2 December	One Thing at a Time	Morgan Wallen
9 December	One Thing at a Time	Morgan Wallen
16 December	One Thing at a Time	Morgan Wallen
23 December	One Thing at a Time	Morgan Wallen
30 December	This One's for You	Luke Combs

== See also ==
- 2024 in music
- List of number-one albums of 2024 (Australia)
