= List of number-one urban albums of 2024 (Australia) =

ARIA Charts number-one urban albums of 2024 < 2023 2025 >

Other Australian number-one charts of 2024
- albums
- singles
- urban singles
- dance singles
- club tracks
- digital tracks
- streaming tracks

Top Australian singles and albums of 2024
- Triple J Hottest 100
- top 25 singles
- top 25 albums

The ARIA Hip Hop/R&B Albums Chart is a weekly chart that ranks the best-performing hip hop and R&B albums in Australia. It is published by the Australian Recording Industry Association (ARIA), an organisation that collects music data for the weekly ARIA Charts. To be eligible to appear on the chart, the recording must be an album of a predominantly urban nature.

== Chart history ==
Issue date	Album	Artist(s)	Reference
1 January	The Diamond Collection	Post Malone	
8 January	The Diamond Collection	Post Malone	
15 January	The Diamond Collection	Post Malone	
22 January	American Dream	21 Savage	
29 January	The Diamond Collection	Post Malone	
5 February	The Diamond Collection	Post Malone	
12 February	The Diamond Collection	Post Malone	
19 February	Vultures 1	Kanye West and Ty Dolla Sign	
26 February	Vultures 1	Kanye West and Ty Dolla Sign	
4 March	SOS	SZA	
11 March	SOS	SZA	
18 March	SOS	SZA	
25 March	SOS	SZA	
1 April	We Don't Trust You	Future and Metro Boomin	
8 April	SOS	SZA	
15 April	Might Delete Later	J. Cole	
22 April	SOS	SZA	
29 April	SOS	SZA	
6 May	SOS	SZA	
13 May	SOS	SZA	
20 May	SOS	SZA	
27 May	SOS	SZA	
3 June	Walking Under Stars (10th Anniversary Edition)	Hilltop Hoods	
10 June	SOS	SZA	
17 June	SOS	SZA	
24 June	New World Depression	Suicideboys	
1 July	SOS	SZA	
8 July	The Diamond Collection	Post Malone	
15 July	SOS	SZA	
22 July	The Death of Slim Shady (Coup de Grâce)	Eminem	
29 July	The Death of Slim Shady (Coup de Grâce)	Eminem	
5 August	The Death of Slim Shady (Coup de Grâce)	Eminem	
12 August	Vultures 2	¥$ Kanye West and Ty Dolla Sign	
19 August	Vultures 2	¥$ Kanye West and Ty Dolla Sign	
26 August	The Diamond Collection	Post Malone	
2 September	Days Before Rodeo	Travis Scott	
9 September	The Diamond Collection	Post Malone	
16 September	The Diamond Collection	Post Malone	
23 September	The Death of Slim Shady (Coup de Grâce)	Eminem	
30 September	The Diamond Collection	Post Malone	
7 October	The Diamond Collection	Post Malone	
14 October	The Diamond Collection	Post Malone	
21 October	Utopia	Travis Scott	
28 October	Utopia	Travis Scott	
4 November	Chromakopia	Tyler, the Creator	
11 November	Chromakopia	Tyler, the Creator	
18 November	Chromakopia	Tyler, the Creator	
25 November	Chromakopia	Tyler, the Creator	
2 December	GNX	Kendrick Lamar	
9 December	GNX	Kendrick Lamar	
16 December	GNX	Kendrick Lamar	
23 December	GNX	Kendrick Lamar	
30 December	SOS	SZA	

== See also ==
- 2024 in music
- List of number-one albums of 2024 (Australia)
