= Julie Higginbotham =

Australian photographer and painter (born 1953)

Julie E. Higginbotham
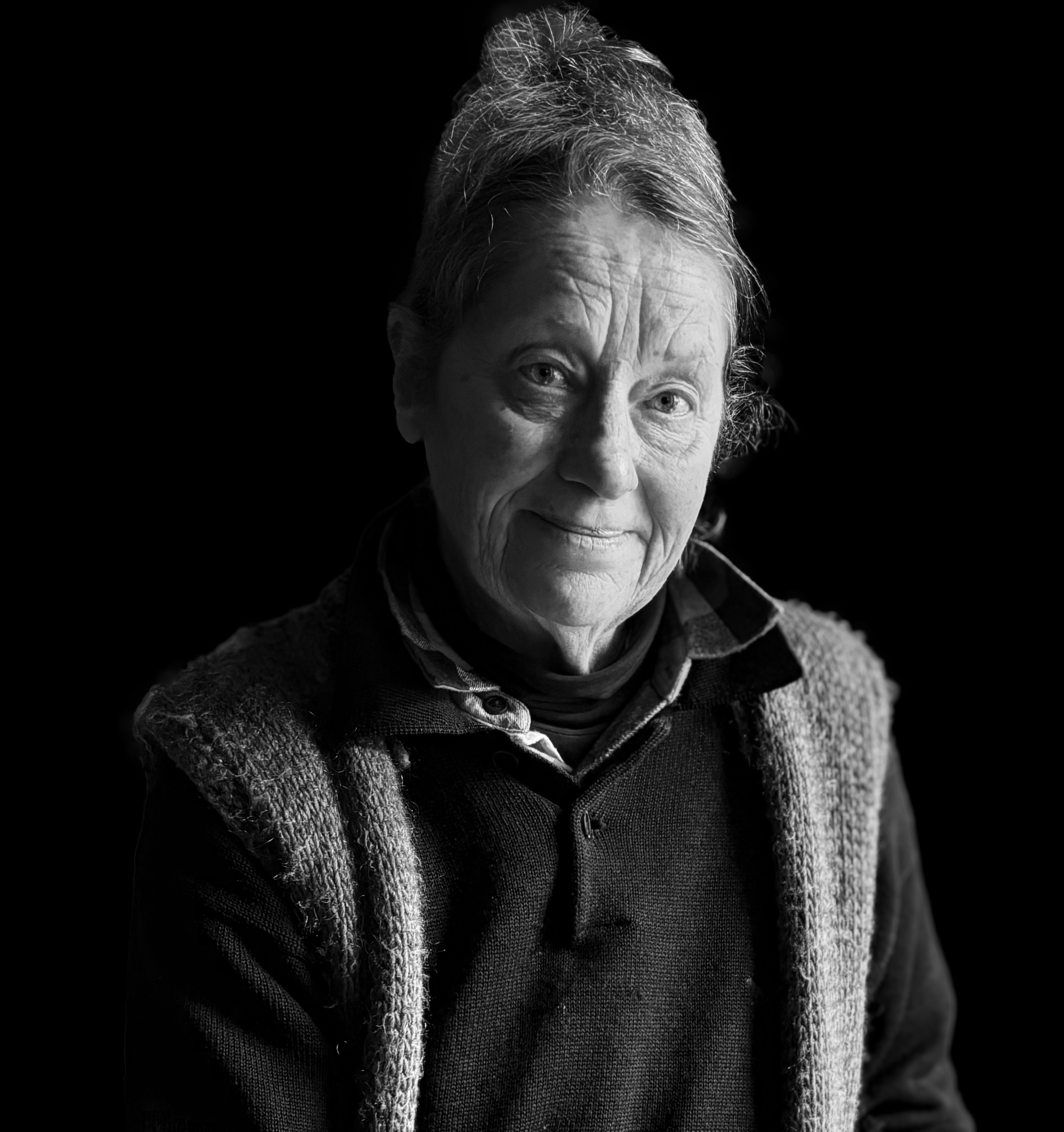
- Julie Higginbotham, 2024
- Born: June 17, 1953 (age 73); Coburg
- Education: Prahran College of Advanced Education, Preston Institute, Phillip Institute of Technology
- Known for: Gallery director and curator, photographer, printmaker
- Style: neo-expressionist
- Parents: Kenneth A. Higginbotham (father); Margery Ellen (née Rackham) (mother)

Julie Elizabeth Higginbotham is an Australian humanist documentary and artist photographer, printmaker and painter, and gallerist. She was born to Margery Ellen (née Rackham) and Kenneth A. Higginbotham, a real estate agent, in Coburg on 17 June 1953, and spent her childhood in Ascot Vale and Essendon.

== Education and early career ==
With a Voigtlander 35mm rangefinder camera given her by an aunt in 1970 Higginbotham made her first photographs with which she applied to enter the Diploma of Visual Arts and Design at Prahran College of Advanced Education. She studied photography and cinematography under lecturer and film director Paul Cox, later renting a room in his house in Murray Street South Yarra (1973-4). Head of photography Athol Shmith and lecturer John Cato submitted her final year work for publication by the Institute of Australian Photographers.

Portraiture has been part of Higginbotham's photographic practice from her early days. While still a student she was publicity photographer for several Melbourne ‘Soul’ bands including the Hot City Bump Band, Pantha, and Powerhouse, with images published in Juke and Ram, and at various live music venues photographed bands playing including Rock Granite, Renée Geyer, Marcia Hines, Chris McNulty, Dave Flett, and The Dugites, and satirist Tim McKew. To augment her student allowance she also worked part time during her final year at the college's media services department from which she also borrowed equipment.

She then rented a small shop residence opposite the Prahran Town Hall, and set up a studio and darkroom in a nearby space with Denise Officer, who had also attended Prahran College, and she documented events around the lively Greville Street precinct, its Saturday market and the Station Hotel music venue. After seeing her first solo show in December 1975 at Faraday Gallery in Carlton, Fred Milgrom of Outback Press commissioned a book cover for its publication The Institution by Walter Adamson. In 1976 her father died and Higginbotham moved in with her mother at Strathmore Heights. At Preston Institute under lecturer Daniel Moynihan, she trained as a printmaker in 1977.

After graduating in 1977 Higginbotham was employed as assistant to the photographer for Handbury Advertising in the McEwans building in Bourke Street. With that experience, over 1978-80 she conducted a business partnership, Double J Photographics with Julie Clark at Rankins Lane, Melbourne designing and publishing catalogues for the First Australian Sculpture Triennial and for George Paton Gallery, and in 1981 she was employed as a scenic artist at the Melbourne commercial television station GTV 9.

== Style and reception ==
Higginbotham's photography, printmaking and painting has a social activist, often feminist, purpose. Museum of Australian Photography curator Stella Loftus-Hills notes of her early work that was made when "part of a lively hippie community in Prahran [where] living conditions were squalid, the cheap rents attracted artists, musicians and alternative thinkers to the area, and...the atmosphere was tribal. Greville Street at this time was one of Melbourne's key counterculture locations, known for live music, organic food and second-hand clothes shops," where Higginbotham practiced "unobtrusive street photography" popular in the mid-1970s; "making candid expressive images such as Catching butterflies, Prahran Park (1974) which records a moment of human interaction with a keen eye for composition and synchronicity."

As noted by Mayhew, with Lesley Baxter, Ally Black, Linda Brassel, Julia Church, Zana Dare, Deej Fabyc, Maggie Fooke, Catriona Holyoake, Barbara Miles, Kate Reeves, Linda Rhodes, Julie Shiels, Lin Tobias, Julia Tobin, Kath Walters, Carole Wilson, and 'Chaz' and Karen, Higginbotham was a member of the radical Jill Posters group and produced political screenprints with them, effectively illustrated slogans that they pasted up in public sites, but so striking that they attracted a following and sales in alternative bookshops. Alongside works of other artists of similar convictions, Jane Crowley, Pat Bull, and Anna Liebzeit, her paintings and other prints appeared in shows across several venues at the 1999 Network of Women Students Australia's Feminist Art About Women conference.

Her collage images, some presented unconventionally in window frames with venetian blinds, and accompanied by text addressing the housing problem in Melbourne, were made for Condition Incorporated held at the George Paton Gallery at Melbourne University in 1979, which as Vivian notes "embraced the new paradigm of art as information," citing the exhibition as one using "art practice to formulate, arrange and examine" facts and issues. Higginbotham and collaborators Julie Clark and Peter Hannaford held poetry readings and discussions throughout the duration of the show. The group made school visits where they hung the work in libraries and gave introductory talks. Two of the photographs were purchased by the Australian National Gallery for the Phillip Morris Collection.

Of Higginbotham's 1983 solo exhibition of 22 etchings, linocuts and painting at Bitumen River Gallery, Sasha Grishin remarked in The Canberra Times that it brought with it "all the angst, sarcasm and expressionistic frenzy of the Melbourne art scene...[in] an attack on social inequities" of capitalism. Characterising her works as "inhabited with clumsy, bulky forms arranged with a cartoon-strip-like directness, accompanied by inscriptions making simple and unambiguous statements. I felt that her principal aim was to get the message across with maximum clarity; with least possible room for misinterpretation, like a political manifesto statement, angry and vibrant, being represented in a visual form." However, his ahistoric comparison of her imagery with that of German Expressionist George Grosz's artistic protest at injustice in the Weimar Republic found Higginbotham's lacking his "richness, subtlety and beauty."

A 1999 survey of her printmaking Come And See My Etchings! The art of Julie Higginbotham 1979-1995, at Kaleidoscope Cafe Gallery was reviewed in Imprint by art historian Margaret E. McGuire who taught at Prahran College, and like Grishin, comments that "like many of her peers she uses printmaking to communicate dissenting ideas about politics and Australian society (twenty years ago screenprint posters were the popular choice)...Higginbotham still prefers the workshop to the studio, shunning the isolation of the ego. As in music - a passion central to her working life - artists in a workshop have to cooperate and often influence each other. Wit and whimsy are her own characteristics - the title sends up the stereotyped sexual mastery of the cliché while keeping its invitation to seduction."

Having moved after an intense period of managing art galleries to care for her ageing mother at Point Lonsdale on the Bellarine Peninsula in 2001, where she continued to exhibit her printmaking and photography, Higginbotham became Borough of Queenscliffe's community representative for Recreation, and joined its Cultural & Arts Access Advisory Committee. James notes of her work of this period that "Julie's sometimes political and humorous titles compel the viewer to pause to understand the artists narrative inspiration...These facts are not necessary in order to enjoy the picture, but a little inside information certainly helps the viewer to understand the artist's message...Rebirth came after the artist's long recovery from a back injury."

== Gallerist 1981–2001 ==
=== Iceberg ===
In late 1978 Higginbotham took on a studio at 5 Rankins Lane (off Little Bourke Street) in the Melbourne CBD with some fellow artists then made it her residence as well. Neighbouring buildings were occupied by artists, of whom Higginbotham made photo-portraits over the 1978-1983 period, including of Mirka Mora. In 1981, Higginbotham and Richard Collis co-founded the artist-run space Iceberg Gallery in the same space. At the same time, over 1981-82, Higginbotham undertook postgraduate studies in Fine Art, majoring in printmaking and photography at Phillip Institute of Technology (an amalgamation of the State College of Victoria at Coburg and her former Preston Institute of Technology in Bundoora).

In a 1982 Age newspaper article, Susan McCulloch, later co-author of the Encyclopedia of Australian Art, describes two general ways in which art galleries were run: either with the gallery taking commission on works sold, or rental of the space to the artist at a flat fee for the duration of the exhibition. Most of Australia’s established galleries, she writes, worked on the commission system to cover costs, the gallery being responsible for promotion and advertising, negotiating sales, and sometimes arranging future commissions for the artist. McCulloch notes that at Iceberg, then one of Melbourne’s newest galleries, artists Collis, Higginbotham (known as “Brownie”), and Serena Nankivell rented its space to artists at A$100 per week (2025 value A$450) and usually for three weeks, for which the gallery would mail out invitations, install the work, and provide wine for the opening. Only sales exceeding $900 incurred a commission. They did not serve as artists' agents, leaving artists free to choose to show at other galleries after using Iceberg for exposure. The gallery was like an extension of their own studios and was ideally situated in Rankins Lane, then largely occupied by artists, and was also available for other activities such as music and performance. By 1983 Holloway was noting that Iceberg Gallery had become “one of the few important alternative galleries in Melbourne.”

Iceberg's calendar included performances of Not still lives. A play about Margaret Preston (1875-1963) & Thea Proctor (1879-1966) by Suzanne Spunner andMeredith Rogers, 25 August–12 September 1982; a controversial inclusion of Craig Haire's artwork consisting of human bones for the inaugural Melbourne Fringe Festival of 1982; the annual CICD Peace Art Exhibition, 15–27 November 1983, and shows from interstate such as that by Canberra's Bitumen River Collective in 1983. Artists represented in 1983 included the Fringe Network Artists, Peter Adams, Imelda Dover, Noel Hart, Lisa Roberts and Barbara Weiss, Caulfield Institute of Technology printmakers, Peter Rosson, Rosie Lugg, Richard Collis, Jill Orr, Shiralee Saul and Ann Ferguson.

=== Sydney ===
After leaving Iceberg for a study tour in Europe in late 1983, and then moving to Sydney in 1984, Higginbotham was a gallery assistant, first at Artbank, then part time at Garry Anderson Gallery, Darlinghurst, where her 1977 photograph of Peter Caddy was shown in Australian Photography in August –September 1988, while she was operating a sole trader business 'Positive Negative Photographics' over 1986-88 in the Trades Hall, Sydney undertaking press photography for union magazines.

=== Brunswick Mechanics' Institute ===
Returning to Melbourne, Higginbotham curated an exhibition in 1990 Artzwick ARTWORX I at the Brunswick Mechanics' Institute that assembled from a recently formed collective 94 works by 48 artists, plus tapestries created out of the Brunswick Patterns of Our Lives project of 1987, thus revealing the number of artists living in the northern suburb. Of the 94 works exhibited, seven pieces were purchased by the City of Brunswick, the basis of the Brunswick Art Collection.

Those contacts made in the show as well as encouragement from councillors, the Brunswick Music Festival and the local community, inspired Higginbotham’s directing of Brunswick Mechanics Institute Gallery (1993-99) where she secured annual schedules of exhibitions hosting such shows as the annual Women’s Salon, community group shows such as the Turkish Festival, Lebanese Festival, Refugee Week, Koori Festival, 18 Colours annual group exhibition, the Gabriela Mistral commemorative exhibition of the Chilean poet, June Mills' Images of a Larrakia Woman, and Desert Painters, by the Yappa Town mob, fourteen of whom traveled from Alice Springs for the opening, and performances by musicians, and many solo and group exhibitions by local Brunswick artists.

Higginbotham undertook art documentation, including Jill Orr's performance The Digging in and the Climbing Out at Lake Burley Griffin, Canberra, and for such magazines as Art + Australia.

=== Counihan ===
In 1999 the gallery was relocated to the Brunswick Town Hall and was rebadged The Counihan Gallery in Brunswick (named for prominent artist Noel Counihan). Through her company Julie Higginbotham Arts Management (1999-2001) she negotiated a contractual agreement with the City of Moreland, and was instrumental in its establishment. During the process art historian, Bernard Smith offered valuable encouragement.

The exhibition, more ... art in moreland, with 128 local artists aged 17 to 85, and 143 exhibits, marked the opening of the new Counihan Gallery in the revamped Brunswick Town Hall. Twenty works were sold, including 4 works that were purchased by the Moreland City Council for the Municipal Art Collection. It had been the gallery’s policy that no commission would be taken on the sales of the artwork. All proceeds going directly to the artist. Her knowledge of Brunswick history was recognised in consultations such as for the film Hope.

In addition, Higginbotham curated exhibitions freelance at such venues as the 1995 Stenopaeics (curated with Leonie Richardson) with examples of pinhole photography by Darren Glass, Tim Mackrell, Rhonda Stevens, Roger Skinner, Victoria Cooper, Ron Left, Mathew Cox, Andrew Craig Steinman, Leonie Richardson, Doug Spowart, Max Osborne at the Centre for Contemporary Photography.

== Educator ==
Until Prahran College was amalgamated with the VCA at the end of 1991 when three tenured technicians were transferred from Prahran along with all the heads of departments within the Art School, and her position was made redundant, Higginbotham was employed as a studio technician in printmaking over 1990-1992 at the Victorian College of the Arts.

She directed her energy into the Brunswick art community and coordinating an annual visual arts program at the inner Melbourne suburb's Mechanics Institute. To augment her salary she then started teaching in the National Gallery of Victoria Society's summer and winter schools from 1992, and then at tertiary institutions from 1991, in visual arts courses at Victorian College of the Arts and RMIT printmaking workshops through to 1996, while also lecturing from 1993 in printmaking at RMIT and Western Metropolitan College of TAFE (1993-4), and Swinburne University School of Design 1993-95 and 1998-99 as a sessional lecturer.

Since relocating to Castlemaine in 2003, Higginbotham has concentrated on her photography and art practice full time.

== Publications ==
Higginbotham contributed design and photography for catalogues and books:

- McCullough, Thomas G.; Clark, Julie; Higginbotham, Julie; Semmens, Sally; Adshead, Soosie; McCullough, Roma, eds. (1981). First Australian Sculpture Triennial at Preston Institute of Technology and La Trobe University. Melbourne: First Australian Sculpture Triennial Committee. ISBN 0959411208.
- Newton, Gael; Hall, Barbara (1981). Australian women photographers 1890-1950 (exhib. cat. ed.). Melbourne: George Paton Gallery. ISBN 0 9597254 7 4. OCLC 502141425.
- Painters Gallery; Smith, Treania (1985). Treania Smith collection, 18 June-6 July, 1985 (exhibition cat. ed.). Sydney, N.S.W.: Painters Gallery. ISBN 9780959052305. OCLC 27630508.

== Selected exhibitions ==
=== Solo ===
- 2001, July: Come and See my Etchings! Murston House, Geelong
- 1998, 27 July–28 August: Come and See My Etchings! the art of Julie Higginbotham 1979-1995. Kaleidoscope Cafe Gallery, Melbourne
- 1983, 13–31 July: Julie Higginbotham Etchings and Linocuts. Bitumen River Gallery, Manuka, ACT
- 1982, 14 November–5 December: Etchings, drawings and linocuts by Julie Higginbotham. Iceberg Gallery
- 1975, December: first solo show. Faraday Gallery, Carlton

=== Group ===
- 2025: Long Exposure: Legacy of Prahran College. 2025 Ballarat Foto Biennale
- 2025, 4-25 May: Beyond the Basement. Magnet Galleries, Docklands, Melbourne
- 2025, March–May: The Basement: Photography from Prahran College (1968-1981), Museum of Australian Photography
- 2020, 24 September–8 November: Art of the Flower & Garden- The Weird World of the Imagination. Burra Gallery
- 2001, December: Jo Voigt and Julie Higginbotham, In a Snapshot. Queenscliff Town Hall, opened by the Mayor Cr. Val Lawrence
- 2019, 2 - 17 August: Maggie Diaz Photography Prize For Women. Bright Space, St Kilda
- 1992, 28 October–8 November: Fact: An Installation, Higginbotham with Davida Allen, Andrew Arnaoutopoulos, Kate Brennan, Warren Burt, Colin Campbell, Alan Cruikshank, Carolyn Eskdale, Janet Gallagher, Marion Gaemers, Jane Graham, Paul Hewson, Stephen Hall, Timothy Hill (with Jack Price), Leigh Hobba, Clint Hurrell, Berni Janssen, Jane Kent, Penelope Lee, Michael J. Liddle, Anne Lord, Bruce Macdonald, David McDowell, Kim Mahood, Leon Marvell, Antony Moulis, Anne Neil, Marcus O’Donnell, Melissa Ogden, Simon O’Mallon, Emma Palmer, Andrew Petrusevics, Barbara Pitman, Ian Rhodes, Lyn Riddett, Neil Roberts, Bernhard Sachs, June Savage, Therese Stuart, Douglas Thomas, Hiram To, Kevin Todd, Jane Trengove, Katarina Vesterberg, Linda Marie Walker, Richard Ward, John Waller, Adam Wolter, Andrew Wright-Smith, Nicholas Zurbrugg. Australian Centre for Contemporary Art, Melbourne
- 1989: Seamans Mission Gallery, Melbourne
- 1989, from 17 August: Heidelberg And Heritage: Two Visions Of Australia - One Hundred Years Apart. A Memorial To Lloyd Rees (1895-1988). 200 artists, opened by Margaret Whitlam. Linden Gallery, St Kilda
- 1989 Published: [Melbourne] : Wilderness Society, 1989. Description: [20] p. : col. ill. ; 23 cm. Notes: Catalogue of an exhibition organised by the Wilderness Society and held at the Linden Gallery, St. Kilda, Aug. 17 - Sept. 3, 1989, for the centenary of the 9 x 5 exhibition. (2 copies).
- 1988, 4–6 May: Australia Illustrated: a reflection on Federation, Higginbotham with Graeme Peebles, Clive Dixon, Sally Armfield, Nicholas Nedelkopoulos, Eamonn Scott, Heather Shimmen, Barry Dickins, Mary Hammond, Geoff Faulkner, Gary James, Peter Walsh, Cathy Drummond, Richie Clendinnen, David Harley, Judith Harley, Bill Hay, Keith Looby, Steven Krahe, Alice Nixon, Bronwyn Dennis, Lewis Miller, Phillip Faulks , Gary Willis, Laurie Peterson, David Gregory, Tina Haynes, Karen Rhodes, Alex Zubryn, Debbie Mcrae, Glenn Morgan, Geoff Hogg. Brunswick South Primary School
- 1988, 16 August–3 September: Australian Photography 1928–1988. Garry Anderson Gallery, Darlinghurst
- 1984, 7–26 May: Arts Space shopfront installation Mark Foy’s window, Sydney
- 1980: Women and Work. Trades Hall, Melbourne (travelling 1981)
- 1980: Australian Student Printmakers. Print Council of Australia, Melbourne
- 1979: Latrobe University Gallery Snap It -Click It with Jenni Mather. Photographs
- 1978, 6–23 June: Condition Incorporated. A Study of Melbourne's Planning and Housing Problems. Julie Clarke, Julie Higginbotham, Peter Hannaford, mixed media, collage, drawing, photographs, sculpture, film, poetry readings. George Paton Gallery

== Cinematography ==
- 1970: Mirka Prahran College of Advanced Education students, dir. Paul Cox
- 1976: Stills photographer, Illuminations dir. Paul Cox
- 1985: Script writer, set design, camera operator, co-editor) Egami dir. Sue Ford

== Awards ==
- 2019: Finalist, Maggie Diaz Photography Prize For Women

== Collections ==
- National Gallery of Australia
- State Library Victoria
- Art Gallery of Ballarat
- Australian Print Council
- Victorian College of the Arts
- Museum of Australian Photography
- Represented in private collections
