= 2025 Electronic Dance Music Awards =

American music awards

- Awarded for: excellence on the EDM scene
- Date: March 28, 2025
- Venue: Eden Roc Miami Beach Hotel
- Country: United States
- Hosted by: Erin Webster
- Website: edmawardsmiami.com

The 2025 Electronic Dance Music Awards (also known as the EDMAs) took place on March 28, 2025, at the Eden Roc Hotel during the height of Miami Music Week.

The event, once again counted with iHeart Media for their extensive coverage. Erin Webster returned as the ceremony host. The awards celebrated the best songs, artists, and festivals from the global electronic dance music scene of 2024, chosen by the public on EDMAs official website. Voting were officially open on February 24, 2025. The winners were revealed on March 24. Afrojack and Crystal Waters were announced as this years Icon Awards recipient, while Mike Weiss was honored with the Industry Achievement award, and Above & Beyond with the Legend Award.

== Winners and nominees ==
Nominations were announced on February 24:

=== General ===
| Male Artist of the Year | Female Artist of the Year | Vocalist of the Year |
|---|---|---|
| Tiësto; John Summit; ILLENIUM; Dom Dolla; Anyma; Subtronics; Porter Robinson | HAYLA; Anabel Englund; LP Giobbi; Nora En Pure; HALIENE; Kaleena Zanders; Daya; REZZ; Amelie Lens; CloZee | Becky Hill; HAYLA; Zara Larsson; Ava Max; Anne-Marie; Clementine Douglas; Paige (BONNIE X CLYDE) |
| Favorite Album | Producer of the Year | Label of the Year |
| Zedd—Telos; Frank Walker—ORIGIN; Forester—Moonlight; BONNIE X CLYDE—There's No Tomorrow; Porter Robinson—SMILE! :D; RÜFÜS DU SOL—Inhale / Exhale; Lane 8—Childish; Fred again..—ten days; Louis The Child—The Sun Comes Up; Justice—Hyperdrama | Vintage Culture; Tiësto; Dom Dolla; LP Giobbi; Fred again..; Armin van Buuren; Skrillex; FISHER; PAWSA; Sara Landry | Armada Music; Spinnin’ Records; Ultra Records; Epic Records; mau5trap; Defected Records; Helix Records; Toolroom Records; Palm Tree Records |
| Music Video of the Year | Favorite Group | Best Collaboration |
| "Gravity" (featuring Tyler Shaw)—Frank Walker; "Throw Some Ass"—SOFI TUKKER; "We Are Family"—Cedric Gervais, Nile Rodgers; "I'm the Drama"—Bebe Rexha; "Hot Honey"—Tiësto, Alana Springsteen; "Satellite"—Dimension, Alison Wonderland; "Body Say"—XANDRA, Gigi Grombacher; "Last of Us" (featuring Rita Ora)—Gryffin; "Lucky" (featuring Remi Wolf)—Zedd | BONNIE X CLYDE; SOFI TUKKER; Above & Beyond; MEDUZA; Cheat Codes; Loud Luxury; ISOKNOCK; Chase & Status; Levity; Laszewo | "Stay High"—Diplo, HUGEL & Julia Church; "Not Even Love"—Seven Lions, ILLENIUM, ÁSDÍS; "Without You"—Kygo, HAYLA; "Never Letting Go"—Alok, Gryffin & Julia Church; "Like a G6"—Timmy Trumpet, POLTERGST with Naeleck; "Follow the Light"—Armin van Buuren, Hardwell; "Everything You Do"—Afroki (Steve Aoki & Afrojack), Aviella; "The Way It Is"—Cheat Codes, Two Friends; "Another World"—MEDUZA, HAYLA; "Push"—Skrillex, Hamdi, TAICHU, OFFAIAH |
| Best New Artist | Dubstep Artist of the Year | DnB (Drum and Bass) Song of the Year |
| D.O.D.; XANDRA; CYRIL; Levity; dot; Z3LLA; KASIA; KI/KI; Ben Hemsley; Rebūke | Subtronics; Excision; NGHTMRE; Wooli; LEVEL UP; Mersiv; Zeds Dead; Ray Volpe; Moody Good; Hamdi | "Wildfire"—Sub Focus; "CAVE"—Dom Dolla, Tove Lo; "Backbone"—Chase & Status, Stormzy; "The Unknown"—NERO; "Satellite"—Dimension, Alison Wonderland |
| Best Radio Show | Best Fan Army | |
| "A State of Trance"—Armin van Buuren; "Protocol Radio"—Nicky Romero; "Heldeep Radio"—Oliver Heldens; "#bpmMix"—StoneBridge; "Good Vibes Radio"—Vinny Vibe; "Powertools"—Richard Vission; "Desire Radio"—Joel Corry; "SINPHONY Radio"—Timmy Trumpet; "Club Life"—Tiësto; "Toolroom Radio"—Mark Knight | Marshmello—[Mellogang]; ILLENIUM—[Illenials]; deadmau5—[The Horde]; Martin Garrix—[Garrixers]; Excision—[Headbangers]; Subtronics—[CYCLOPS ARMY]; Alan Walker—[Walkers] | |
| Male Icon Award | Female Icon Award | Industry Achievement |
| Afrojack | Crystal Waters | Mike Weiss |
Legend Award
Above & Beyond

=== Breakout ===
| Breakout Artist of the Year | Breakout Female Vocalist |
|---|---|
| Levity; Jex; Hedex; Sara Landry; Beltran; Cassian; Disco Lines; Hamdi; Max Styler | Linney; CLOVES; Aviella; OAKS; Jex; Julia Church; PollyAnna; Sarah de Warren |
| Breakout Mashup Artist of the Year | Breakout Remixer of the Year |
| Spice; Aurelios; Cazes; Mister Gray; Netgate | Martial Simon; JPAN; DJ Dark; 5Hours; Silano; Deux Twins; Kastra |

=== Dance ===
| Dance Song of the Year | Dance Radio Song of the Year |
|---|---|
| MEDUZA, HAYLA—Another World; David Guetta, Alesso—Never Going Home Tonight (ft. Madison Love); Dom Dolla—girl$; Adam Port, Stryv—Move (ft. Malachiii); Justice—Neverender (with Tame Impala); Sonny Fodera, Jazzy, D.O.D—Somedays | Martin Garrix, Jex—Told You So; John Summit, HAYLA—Shiver; John Summit, Sub Focus—Go Back (ft. Julia Church); Seven Lions, ILLENIUM—Not Even Love (ft. ÁSDÍS); Bebe Rexha—I'm the Drama; Zedd—Lucky (ft. Remi Wolf); Enisa, Kaskade—Tears Don't Fall |
| Dance Radio Artist of the Year | Dance / Electro Pop Song of the Year |
| Martin Garrix; John Summit; Tiësto; Anabel Englund; Dom Dolla; RÜFÜS DU SOL; Alesso; SOFI TUKKER; Kygo | Cheat Codes, Two Friends—The Way It Is; Two Friends—Wrong Way (ft. Alexander Stewart); Martin Garrix, Jex—Told You So; Kiesza—I Go Dance; Galantis, David Guetta, 5 Seconds of Summer—Lighter; TELYKAST, x.o.anne—Free; Daya—Don't Call; XANDRA, Gigi Grombacher—Body Say; Diplo, Riva Starr—Heaven or Not (ft. Kareen Lomax) |
Pop-Dance Anthem of the Year
Make You Mine—Madison Beer; The Way It Is—Cheat Codes, Two Friends; Told You So—Martin Garrix, Jex; Free—Calvin Harris, Ellie Goulding; Don't Lie—The Chainsmokers, Kim Petras; Living in Color—Audien, Jeoff Harris; Still Into You—CYRIL, maryjo

=== Techno / House / Afro ===
| Tech House Artist of the Year | Tech House Song of the Year | House Song of the Year |
|---|---|---|
| Dom Dolla; Mau P; Chris Lake; James Hype; SIDEPIECE; FISHER; Tita Lau; Cloonee; Kaleena Zanders | "Boost Up"—FISHER, Flowdan; "Heavy Heart"—Loco Dice, Skrillex & Fireboy DML; "4U"—Matroda, Martin Ikin, Sian-Lee; "Taka"—SIDEPIECE, San Pacho; "Stephanie"—Cloonee, Young M.A, Inntraw; "BEATS FOR THE UNDERGROUND"—Mau P; "girl$"—Dom Dolla | "girl$"—Dom Dolla; "Somedays"—Sonny Fodera, Jazzy, D.O.D; "MERTHER"—Mau P; "PICK UP THE PHONE"—PAWSA, Nate Dogg; "Stephanie"—Cloonee, Young M.A, InntRaw; "She's Gone, Dance On"—Disclosure; "I Only Smoke when I Drink"—nimino |
| Techno House Song of the Year | Afro House Song of the Year | Afro House Remix of the Year |
| "Falling for You"—Amelie Lens; "Bloom at Night"—Miss Monique; "Play with Me"—Sara Landry, Shlømo; "New Generation"—Lilly Palmer; "RITMO"—Argy, Omiki, Son of Son; "Orion"—Space 92, HI-LO | "I Adore You"—HUGEL, Topic, Arash, Daecolm; "Mwaki"—Zerb, Sofiya Nzau; "Andalucia"—HUGEL, GROSSOMODDO; "Move"—Adam Port, Stryv, Malachiii; "Yamore"—MoBlack, Salif Keita, Benja, Franc Fala, Cesária Evora; "Sauti"—Francis Mercier, Faul & Wad Ad, African Children's Choir; "Amana"—Maz, VXSION | "Yo Voy" (DJ TEDDY-O Afro House Remix)—Zion & Lennox, Daddy Yankee; "You & Me" (Rivo Remix)—Disclosure, Eliza Doolittle; "Mwaki" (Sunnery James & Ryan Marciano Remix)—Zerb; "Houdini" (Adam Port Mix)—Dua Lipa; "One Dance" (Peace Control Remix)—Drake |

=== DJ / Club ===
| Club DJ of the Year | Favorite Club Track |
|---|---|
| Timmy Trumpet; Steve Aoki; James Hype; AFROJACK; John Summit; Diplo | James Hype—Wild; Kaleena Zanders, Tchami—DADDY KEEPS CALLING; Nathan Dawe, Joel Corry—HIGHER (ft. SACHA); David Guetta, Cedric Gervais—Switch; PLS&TY—Turning Tides; Tiësto, AFROJACK—Light It Up (ft. MC Ambush); HASKELL, Mark Knight, Gene Farris—Go Deep; Sebastian Ingrosso, Steve Angello—Skip; Local Singles & Sam Blacky—Hotsteppa |
| Favorite Nightclub Residency (U.S.) | Mixshow DJ of the Year (Top 40 / Dance) |
| Timmy Trumpet—FWD Day + Nightclub | Cleveland; Kaskade—BigNight Live | Boston; R3hab—Marquee Dayclub | Las Vegas; Steve Aoki—HQ | Atlantic City; Cash Cash—Zouk Nightclub + Ayu Dayclub | Las Vegas | Bodega Brad (103.5 WKTU); DJ Nurotic (103.5 Chicago); DJ GHOST (Q102 PHILLY); DJ Triple XL (KIIS FM Los Angeles); DJ Jaime Ferreira (93.3 FLZ); DJ GQ (Y100 Miami); DJ Sticky Boots (HyperMiXx); DJ Jay Mac (Most Requested Live); DJ AUDIO1—(Ghetto House Radio); DJ Oreo—(106.9 K-HITS) |

=== Mashup / Remix ===
| Best Use of Sample | Mashup Artist of the Year |
|---|---|
| Sam Feldt, Steve Aoki, Nile Rodgers—I'm Going Out; Mau P—MERTHER; David Guetta, Alphaville, Ava Max—Forever Young; Öwnboss, NXNJAS, Chamillionaire—Ridin Dirty; James Hype—7 Seconds | Sickick; DJs From Mars; Switch Disco; Rudeejays; Da Brozz; Arman Aveiru; Beatbreaker; The Anthem Kingz |
| Remix of the Year | Remixer of the Year |
| John Summit & HAYLA—Shiver (Cassian Remix); The Temper Trap—Sweet Disposition (John Summit & Silver Panda Remix); Marlon Hoffstadt—It's That Time (FISHER Remix); Dua Lipa—Houdini (Adam Port Mix); Loofy—Last Night (Anyma & Layton Giordani Remix) | Joel Corry; James Hype; VAVO; Tiësto; BVRNOUT |
| Remake of the Year | Remix Rewind |
| Cedric Gervais, Nile Rodgers—We Are Family; FISHER—Somebody; Mr. Belt & Wezol—It's Not Right but It's OK; Swedish House Mafia & Alicia Keys—Finally; Diplo & HUGEL ft. Julia Church—Stay High | Sean Paul—Get Busy (Odd Mob Remix); Don Omar, Lucenzo—Danza Kuduro (Tiesto Remix); Bob Marley & The Wailers—Jamming (FISHER Remix); Sharam—PATT (Party All the Time) (Adam Beyer, Layton Giordani & Green Velvet Remix); The Outfield—Your Love (Diplo Remix) |
Radio Remixer of the Year
J Bruus; Cosmic Dawn; Kue; Petedown; Charlie Lane

=== Festivals ===
| Main Stage/Festival Song of the Year | Best Performance |
|---|---|
| "Follow the Light"—Armin van Buuren, Hardwell; "Devotion"—KSHMR, 22Bullets; "Everything You Do" (featuring Aviella)—Afroki; "Monster"—Don Diablo, Felix Jaehn; "Hare Ram"—Lilly Palmer; "Switch"—David Guetta, Cedric Gervais | Alok—Tomorrowland Brazil | São Paulo | 2024; John Summit—Madison Square Garden, New York | 2024; Skrillex—Lollapalooza | Chicago | 2024; Tiesto—Ultra Music Festival | Miami 2024; ISOKNOCK—North Coast Music Festival | Chicago 2024; LSZEE [LSDREAM & CloZee]—Red Rocks | Colorado 2024; Odesza—The Gorge | Washington 2024; Keinemusik—The Pyramids of Giza | Egypt 2024 |

Notes

1. The "Rising" and "Breakthrough" categories were renamed as "Breakout".
2. The "Album of the Year" and "Best Group" categories will be presented as "Favorite Album" and "Favorite Group".
3. The following categories were added from this years nominations:
  - Afro House Remix
  - Afro House Song of the Year
  - Favorite Club Track
4. The following categories were absent from this years nominations:
  - Best Down Tempo Turned Up
  - Best Instrumental Non-Vocal Release
  - Breakthrough Trance Artist of the Year
  - DnB (Drum and Bass) Artist of the Year
  - Breakthrough Artist of the Year (Bass)
  - Nightlife DJ of the Year
  - Best B2B
  - Favorite Festival Series (U.S.)

== Most wins ==
The following individuals received two or more Electronic Dance Music Awards:

Three wins

- HAYLA

Two wins

- Armin van Buuren
- Nile Rodgers
- Timmy Trumpet
- Martin Garrix
- Dom Dolla
- HUGEL
