= List of number-one dance singles of 2024 (Australia) =

ARIA Charts number-one dance singles of 2024 < 2023 2025 >

Other Australian number-one charts of 2024
- albums
- singles
- urban singles
- club tracks
- digital tracks
- streaming tracks

Top Australian singles and albums of 2024
- Triple J Hottest 100
- top 25 singles
- top 25 albums

The ARIA Dance Chart is a chart that ranks the best-performing dance singles of Australia. It is published by Australian Recording Industry Association (ARIA), an organisation who collect music data for the weekly ARIA Charts. To be eligible to appear on the chart, the recording must be a single, and be "predominantly of a dance nature, or with a featured track of a dance nature, or included in the ARIA Club Chart or a comparable overseas chart".

== Chart history ==
Date	Song	Artist(s)	Ref.
1 January	"Prada"	Cassö, Raye and D-Block Europe	
8 January	"Prada"	Cassö, Raye and D-Block Europe	
15 January	"Prada"	Cassö, Raye and D-Block Europe	
22 January	"Prada"	Cassö, Raye and D-Block Europe	
29 January	"Prada"	Cassö, Raye and D-Block Europe	
5 February	"Prada"	Cassö, Raye and D-Block Europe	
12 February	"Prada"	Cassö, Raye and D-Block Europe	
19 February	"Prada"	Cassö, Raye and D-Block Europe	
26 February	"Prada"	Cassö, Raye and D-Block Europe	
4 March	"Prada"	Cassö, Raye and D-Block Europe	
11 March	"Prada"	Cassö, Raye and D-Block Europe	
18 March	"Prada"	Cassö, Raye and D-Block Europe	
25 March	"Prada"	Cassö, Raye and D-Block Europe	
1 April	"Stumblin' In"	Cyril	
8 April	"Stumblin' In"	Cyril	
15 April	"Stumblin' In"	Cyril	
22 April	"Stumblin' In"	Cyril	
29 April	"Stumblin' In"	Cyril	
6 May	"Stumblin' In"	Cyril	
13 May	"Stumblin' In"	Cyril	
20 May	"Stumblin' In"	Cyril	
27 May	"Stumblin' In"	Cyril	
3 June	"Stumblin' In"	Cyril	
10 June	"Stumblin' In"	Cyril	
17 June	"Stumblin' In"	Cyril	
24 June	"Stumblin' In"	Cyril	
1 July	"Stumblin' In"	Cyril	
8 July	"Stumblin' In"	Cyril	
15 July	"Stumblin' In"	Cyril	
22 July	"Stumblin' In"	Cyril	
29 July	"360"	Charli XCX	
5 August	"360"	Charli XCX	
12 August	"360"	Charli XCX	
19 August	"360"	Charli XCX	
26 August	"360"	Charli XCX	
2 September	"Backbone"	Chase & Status and Stormzy	
9 September	"Kisses"	Bl3ss and CamrinWatsin featuring Bbyclose	
16 September	"Backbone"	Chase & Status and Stormzy	
23 September	"Kisses"	Bl3ss and CamrinWatsin featuring Bbyclose	
30 September	"Kisses"	Bl3ss and CamrinWatsin featuring Bbyclose	
7 October	"Kisses"	Bl3ss and CamrinWatsin featuring Bbyclose	
14 October	"Kisses"	Bl3ss and CamrinWatsin featuring Bbyclose	
21 October	"Kisses"	Bl3ss and CamrinWatsin featuring Bbyclose	
28 October	"Kisses"	Bl3ss and CamrinWatsin featuring Bbyclose	
4 November	"Kisses"	Bl3ss and CamrinWatsin featuring Bbyclose	
11 November	"Kisses"	Bl3ss and CamrinWatsin featuring Bbyclose	
18 November	"Kisses"	Bl3ss and CamrinWatsin featuring Bbyclose	
25 November	"Kisses"	Bl3ss and CamrinWatsin featuring Bbyclose	
2 December	"Kisses"	Bl3ss and CamrinWatsin featuring Bbyclose	
9 December	"Kisses"	Bl3ss and CamrinWatsin featuring Bbyclose	
16 December	"Kisses"	Bl3ss and CamrinWatsin featuring Bbyclose	
23 December	"Kisses"	Bl3ss and CamrinWatsin featuring Bbyclose	
30 December	"Stumblin' In"	Cyril	

== See also ==
- 2024 in music
