= I'm the Drama =

Single by Bebe Rexha
- Released: June 28, 2024
- Length: 2:36
- Label: Warner
- Songwriters: Bebe Rexha; Caitlin Stubbs; Hannah Boleyn; Jimmy James
- Producers: Jimmy James; Punctual

Bebe Rexha singles chronology
"Chase It (Mmm Da Da Da)" (2024)	"I'm the Drama" (2024)	"My Oh My" (2024)

Music video
- "I'm the Drama" on YouTube

"I'm the Drama" is a song by American singer and songwriter Bebe Rexha. It was released as a single on June 28, 2024. It was Rexha's last single to be released under Warner Records, before parting ways with the record label.

== Background and release ==
Rexha previewed the track during her set at Coachella 2024, then she continued promoting the track throughout her social media accounts. The song was officially released on June 28, 2024.

== Commercial performance ==
On the week of November 16, 2024, "I'm the Drama" topped the US Dance/Mix Show Airplay chart, becoming Rexha third number-one single on the chart, and her first as a solo artist.

== Reception ==
"I'm the Drama" was met with positive reviews from music critics. ThatGrapeJuice listed the track on their "This Week's Hidden Gems", praising its empowering message, and Rexha performance, while calling it "an instant hit" that stands out of Rexha's discography. Nmesoma Okechukwu for EUPHORIA. highlighted Rexha's confidence on the track, stating that "she owns it like a champ". Drew H. of 100 Word Song Review described the song as "a masterclass in delivering high-quality addictive pop".

=== Accolades ===
List of awards and nominations for "I'm the Drama"
Awards	Year	Category	Result	Ref.
Electronic Dance Music Awards	2025	Dance Radio Song of the Year	Nominated	
Electronic Dance Music Awards	2025	Music Video of the Year	Nominated	

== Music video ==
The official music video for "I'm the Drama" premiered to YouTube on August 15, 2024. It was directed by Jak Payne, and was choreographed by Josh Pilmore. The video received positive reviews from critics who described it as "glamorous", praising the video's color palette, the fashion looks, as well for "capturing the song's essence through its dramatic visuals and Rexha's commanding presence". The music video was nominated for Music Video of the Year at the 2025 Electronic Dance Music Awards.

== Personnel ==
Credits adapted from Apple Music.

- Bebe Rexha — vocals, songwriter, backing vocals
- Caitlin Stubbs — songwriter
- Hannah Boleyn — songwriter, backing vocals,
- Jimmy James — producer, backing vocals, synthesizer programming, keyboards, drums
- Punctual — producer, drum, bass, synthesizer programming
- Devon Corey — engineer
- Chris Gehringer — mastering engineer
- Eric J — mixing engineer

== Charts ==
Weekly chart performance for "I'm the Drama"
Chart (2024)	Peak position
US Dance/Mix Show Airplay (Billboard)	1

== Release history ==
Release dates and formats for "I'm the Drama"
Region	Date	Format	Label	Ref.
Various	June 28, 2024	Digital download; Streaming	Warner Records	

== See also ==
- List of Billboard number-one dance songs of 2024
