= Girls (Dom Dolla song) =

2024 single by Dom Dolla

Single by Dom Dolla
- Released: 7 June 2024
- Length: 3:29
- Label: Three Six Zero; Sony Music
- Songwriter: Dominic Matheson
- Producer: Dom Dolla

Dom Dolla singles chronology
"Saving Up" (2023)	"Girls" (2024)	"Cave" (2024)

"Girls" (stylised as "girl$") is a song by Australian record producer Dom Dolla, featuring uncredited vocals by Caitlin Stubbs and released on 7 June 2024.

About the track, Dom Dolla said that the song is inspired from a conversation he had with his friends who had experienced bad dates. Dolla said "I recorded it and heavily affected my vocals, but felt it needed a strong female performance, so I reached out to my good pal Caitlin Stubbs and asked if she was keen to re-perform the vocal, her voice is fantastic and suits the record so well… I even left some crumbs of my vocal in there, too."

The song was shorted listed for Best Single at the 2025 Rolling Stone Australia Awards.

At the 2025 Electronic Dance Music Awards, the song was nominated for Dance Song of the Year, Tech House Song of the Year and won House Song of the Year.

== Critical reception ==
Rachel Narozniak from Beat Portal said "The single hits like a shot of pure adrenaline; it's saucy, it's empowering, it's unequivocally for the girls."

== Versions ==
Digital download

- "Girl$" – 3:29
- "Girl$" (Layton Giordani remix) – 3:04

== Charts ==
=== Weekly charts ===
Weekly chart performance for "Girls"
Chart (2024)	Peak position
Australia (ARIA)	71
Australia Club Tracks (ARIA)	1
New Zealand Hot Singles (RMNZ)	7
US Hot Dance/Electronic Songs (Billboard)	22

=== Year-end charts ===
2024 year-end chart performance for "Girls"
Chart (2024)	Position
Australian Artist (ARIA)	49
US Hot Dance/Electronic Songs (Billboard)	66

== Certifications ==
Certifications for "Girls"
Region	Certification	Certified units/sales
Australia (ARIA)	Platinum	70,000^{‡}
^{‡} Sales+streaming figures based on certification alone.

== See also ==
- List of number-one club tracks of 2024 (Australia)
