= List of number-one albums of 2024 (Australia) =

ARIA Charts number-one albums of 2024 < 2023 2025 >

Other Australian number-one charts of 2024
- singles
- urban singles
- dance singles
- club tracks
- digital tracks
- streaming tracks

Top Australian singles and albums of 2024
- Triple J Hottest 100
- top 25 singles
- top 25 albums

The ARIA Albums Chart ranks the best-performing albums and extended plays (EPs) in Australia. Its data, published by the Australian Recording Industry Association, is based collectively on the weekly physical and digital sales and streams of albums and EPs. In 2024, 24 albums claimed the top spot. The first number one of the year, Taylor Swift's 1989 (Taylor's Version), carried over from 2023 after spending the last eight weeks of the year at the top. Swift also achieved an additional three number-one albums, with Lover and Midnights returning to the top, and The Tortured Poets Department debuting at number one. Five artists, 21 Savage, Ty Dolla Sign, Gracie Abrams, Sabrina Carpenter and Tyler, the Creator achieved their first number-one album.

== Chart history ==
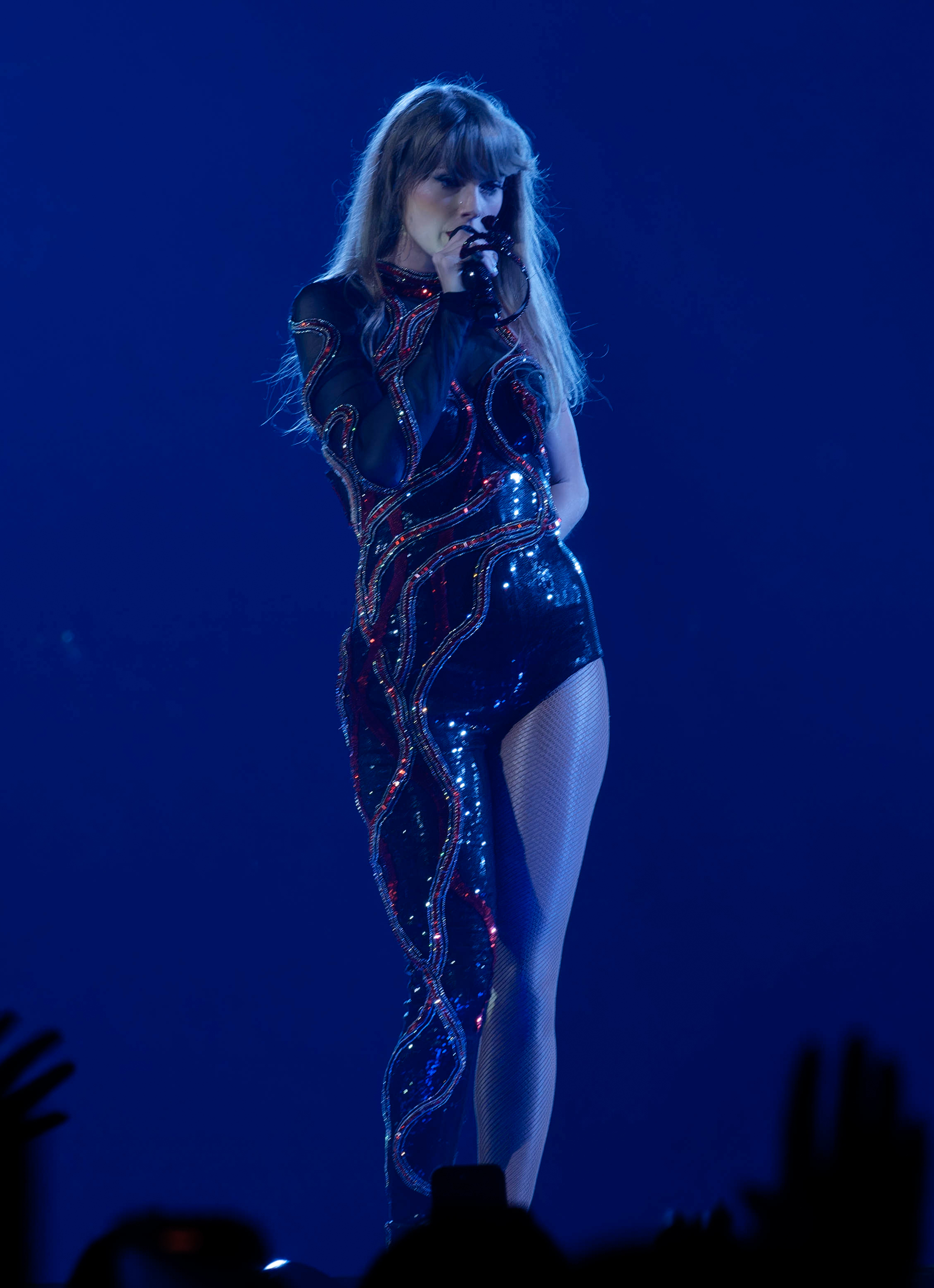
Taylor Swift's The Tortured Poets Department was the longest running and best selling album of the year.

Key
†	Indicates best-performing album of 2024

List of number-one albums
Date	Album	Artist(s)	Ref.
1 January	1989 (Taylor's Version)	Taylor Swift	
8 January	1989 (Taylor's Version)	Taylor Swift	
15 January	1989 (Taylor's Version)	Taylor Swift	
22 January	American Dream	21 Savage	
29 January	1989 (Taylor's Version)	Taylor Swift	
5 February	1989 (Taylor's Version)	Taylor Swift	
12 February	1989 (Taylor's Version)	Taylor Swift	
19 February	Vultures 1	Kanye West and Ty Dolla Sign	
26 February	Midnights	Taylor Swift	
4 March	Midnights	Taylor Swift	
11 March	Lover	Taylor Swift	
18 March	Eternal Sunshine	Ariana Grande	
25 March	Eternal Sunshine	Ariana Grande	
1 April	Eternal Sunshine	Ariana Grande	
8 April	Cowboy Carter	Beyoncé	
15 April	Cowboy Carter	Beyoncé	
22 April	Lover	Taylor Swift	
29 April	The Tortured Poets Department †	Taylor Swift	
6 May	The Tortured Poets Department †	Taylor Swift	
13 May	The Tortured Poets Department †	Taylor Swift	
20 May	The Tortured Poets Department †	Taylor Swift	
27 May	Hit Me Hard and Soft	Billie Eilish	
3 June	Clancy	Twenty One Pilots	
10 June	Hit Me Hard and Soft	Billie Eilish	
17 June	Hit Me Hard and Soft	Billie Eilish	
24 June	Hit Me Hard and Soft	Billie Eilish	
1 July	The Secret of Us	Gracie Abrams	
8 July	The Tortured Poets Department †	Taylor Swift	
15 July	Hit Me Hard and Soft	Billie Eilish	
22 July	The Death of Slim Shady (Coup de Grâce)	Eminem	
29 July	The Death of Slim Shady (Coup de Grâce)	Eminem	
5 August	Enough of the Sweet Talk	Lime Cordiale	
12 August	Beautifully Ordinary	Tones and I	
19 August	Sunday Sadness	Amy Shark	
26 August	50 Years – The Best Of	Cold Chisel	
2 September	Short n' Sweet	Sabrina Carpenter	
9 September	Short n' Sweet	Sabrina Carpenter	
16 September	The Second Act	Missy Higgins	
23 September	Short n' Sweet	Sabrina Carpenter	
30 September	Short n' Sweet	Sabrina Carpenter	
7 October	Short n' Sweet	Sabrina Carpenter	
14 October	Short n' Sweet	Sabrina Carpenter	
21 October	Brat	Charli XCX	
28 October	Tension II	Kylie Minogue	
4 November	Chromakopia	Tyler, the Creator	
11 November	Chromakopia	Tyler, the Creator	
18 November	Moon Music	Coldplay	
25 November	From Zero	Linkin Park	
2 December	GNX	Kendrick Lamar	
9 December	The Tortured Poets Department †	Taylor Swift	
16 December	The Tortured Poets Department †	Taylor Swift	
23 December	The Tortured Poets Department †	Taylor Swift	
30 December	Short n' Sweet	Sabrina Carpenter	

== Number-one artists ==
List of number-one artists, with total weeks spent at number one shown
Position	Artist	Weeks at No. 1
1	Taylor Swift	18
2	Sabrina Carpenter	7
3	Billie Eilish	5
4	Ariana Grande	3
5	Beyoncé	2
5	Eminem	2
5	Tyler, the Creator	2
6	21 Savage	1
6	Kanye West	1
6	Ty Dolla Sign	1
6	Twenty One Pilots	1
6	Gracie Abrams	1
6	Lime Cordiale	1
6	Tones and I	1
6	Amy Shark	1
6	Cold Chisel	1
6	Missy Higgins	1
6	Charli XCX	1
6	Kylie Minogue	1
6	Coldplay	1
6	Linkin Park	1
6	Kendrick Lamar	1

== See also ==
- 2024 in music
- List of number-one singles of 2024 (Australia)
