= List of number-one club tracks of 2024 (Australia) =

ARIA Charts number-one club tracks of 2024 < 2023 2025 >

Other Australian number-one charts of 2024
- albums
- singles
- urban singles
- dance singles
- digital tracks
- streaming tracks

Top Australian singles and albums of 2024
- Triple J Hottest 100
- top 25 singles
- top 25 albums

This is the list of number-one tracks on the ARIA Club Chart in 2024, and is compiled by the Australian Recording Industry Association (ARIA) from weekly DJ reports.

== 2024 ==
Date	Song	Artist(s)	Reference
1 January	"Saving Up"	Dom Dolla	
8 January	"Saving Up"	Dom Dolla	
15 January	"Saving Up"	Dom Dolla	
22 January	"Saving Up"	Dom Dolla	
29 January	"Saving Up"	Dom Dolla	
5 February	"Stars on 45 Theme"	Sgt Slick	
12 February	"Stars on 45 Theme"	Sgt Slick	
19 February	"Stars on 45 Theme"	Sgt Slick	
26 February	"Stars on 45 Theme"	Sgt Slick	
4 March	"Saving Up"	Dom Dolla	
11 March	"Saving Up"	Dom Dolla	
18 March	"Look At Me"	James Alexandr featuring Nada-Leigh	
25 March	"Look At Me"	James Alexandr featuring Nada-Leigh	
1 April	"Look At Me"	James Alexandr featuring Nada-Leigh	
8 April	"Look At Me"	James Alexandr featuring Nada-Leigh	
15 April	"Look At Me"	James Alexandr featuring Nada-Leigh	
22 April	"Look At Me"	James Alexandr featuring Nada-Leigh	
29 April	"Look At Me"	James Alexandr featuring Nada-Leigh	
6 May	"You Got the Love" (Extended/Croix Mix)	Dr. Packer	
13 May	"You Got the Love" (Extended/Croix Mix)	Dr. Packer	
20 May	"You Got the Love" (Extended/Croix Mix)	Dr. Packer	
27 May	"You Got the Love" (Extended/Croix Mix)	Dr. Packer	
3 June	"Sippin' Yak" (Extended/Morgan Seatree Mix)	Cloonee	
10 June	"Get Busy" (Odd Mob Mix)	Sean Paul and Odd Mob	
17 June	"Girls"	Dom Dolla	
24 June	"Girls"	Dom Dolla	
1 July	"Girls"	Dom Dolla	
8 July	"Girls"	Dom Dolla	
15 July	"Girls"	Dom Dolla	
22 July	"Girls"	Dom Dolla	
29 July	"She's Gone, Dance On"	Disclosure	
5 August	"Girls"	Dom Dolla	
12 August	"Girls"	Dom Dolla	
19 August	"She's Gone, Dance On"	Disclosure	
26 August	"She's Gone, Dance On"	Disclosure	
2 September	"Paint It Black"	Hiroshi Daisuki	
9 September	"Paint It Black"	Hiroshi Daisuki	
16 September	"Get Down" Jarred Baker / The Night Slug / Knight Horse mix)	Husky & Sydney Jo Jackson	
23 September	"Blow My Mind" (Nothing But Funk / Bromad & Oscar Jamo mix)	Ben Renna	
30 September	"Blow My Mind" (Nothing But Funk / Bromad & Oscar Jamo mix)	Ben Renna	
7 October	"Beautiful & Young" (Extended / James Hurr / Jordan Magro / Tommy Glasses / Iconn mix)	Harpoon	
14 October	"Tracey in My Room" (Original Extended / Mell Hall / Steve Hart / Lovless Youth mix)	Mark Maxwell featuring De Saint	
21 October	"Tracey in My Room" (Original Extended / Mell Hall / Steve Hart / Lovless Youth mix)	Mark Maxwell featuring De Saint	
28 October	"Tracey in My Room" (Original Extended / Mell Hall / Steve Hart / Lovless Youth mix)	Mark Maxwell featuring De Saint	
4 November	"Tracey in My Room" (Original Extended / Mell Hall / Steve Hart / Lovless Youth mix)	Mark Maxwell featuring De Saint	
11 November	"Tracey in My Room" (Original Extended / Mell Hall / Steve Hart / Lovless Youth mix)	Mark Maxwell featuring De Saint	
18 November	"Psycho Killer" (Extended / Market Memories / Nite Theory / Andy Murphy mix)	Dead Beat Pirates, Andy Murphy and Gaz Kempster	
25 November	"Paradise (Extended / Bruno Blanc / St. Croix mix)"	James Alexandr featuring Nada-Leigh	
2 December	"Paradise (Extended / Bruno Blanc / St. Croix mix)"	James Alexandr featuring Nada-Leigh	
9 December	"Paradise (Extended / Bruno Blanc / St. Croix mix)"	James Alexandr featuring Nada-Leigh	
16 December	"Dirty Cash"	Mind Electric	
23 December	"Dirty Cash"	Mind Electric	
30 December	"Dirty Cash"	Mind Electric	

== Number-one artists ==
Position	Artist	Weeks at No. 1
1	Dom Dolla	15
2	Nada-Leigh (as featuring)	10
3	James Alexandr	7
4	Mark Maxwell	6
4	De Saint (as featuring)	6
5	Sgt Slick	4
5	Dr. Packer	4
6	Disclosure	3
6	James Alexandr	3
8	Mind Electric	3
7	Hiroshi Daisuki	2
7	Ben Renna	2
8	Cloonee	1
8	Sean Paul	1
8	Odd Mob	1
8	Husky & Sydney Jo Jackson	1
8	Harpoon	1
8	Dead Beat Pirates	1
8	Andy Murphy	1
8	Gaz kempster	1

== See also ==
- 2024 in music
