= Hot City Bump Band =

Australian musical group

- Origin: Melbourne, Victoria, Australia
- Genres: Soul; funk
- Years active: 1973–1976
- Label: Wizard/WEA
- Past members: John Adolphus; Robert Ellis; David Green; Mick Holden; Chuck McKinney; Margaret McKinney; David McMaster; Noel Davis

Hot City Bump Band were an Australian soul, funk band which formed in late 1973 by Chuck McKinney (vocals), his wife, Margaret McKinney (vocals), John Adolphus (guitar), David McMaster (organ), Robert Ellis (congas), David Green (bass) and Mick Holden (drums; ex-the Mixtures). They released a studio album, Come Together (1975), that peaked at No. 11 on Melbourne album charts. They broke up in 1976. According to Australian musicologist, Ian McFarlane, they were "one of the first soul/funk bands ever assembled in Australia, and local audiences (having been brought up on a steady diet of rock, boogie and pop) took a while to warm to the band's dance-oriented sound." Chuck McKinney died in September 1994.

== History ==
Hot City Bump Band were formed in late 1973 in Melbourne as a soul, funk band by Chuck McKinney and his wife, Margaret McKinney, both on lead vocals, with John Adolphus on lead guitar, Robert Ellis on congas, David Green on bass guitar, Mick Holden on drums (ex-the Mixtures) and David McMaster on organ. Chuck, from Chicago, had arrived in Australia to perform in the Sydney stage production of Hair, in 1970. After it had finished its run, in 1973, they created "one of the first soul/funk bands ever assembled in Australia, and local audiences (having been brought up on a steady diet of rock, boogie and pop) took a while to warm to the band's dance-oriented sound."

The group performed cover versions of 1960s artists, with their debut single, "Come Together", appearing in 1974 via Wizard Records.

Tony Catterall of The Canberra Times observed their "laid-back soul that completely remakes the song and takes it away from its 'Beatles birth." It was followed later that year by a second single, "Time Is on Your Side". Hot City Bump Band issued their debut album, Come Together, in mid-1975, which was produced by Ern Rose. Catterall opined "I'd have sworn it was the product of a hot US soul combo... the three originals on Come Together are good examples of the soul genre that have won their way onto this album by their merits."

According to Catterall the members were adherents of Guru Maharaj Ji (see Prem Rawat of Divine Light Mission), who Catterall described as "that fat little fraud".

The group's third single, "Do What You Wanna Do" (August 1975), was popular on the local music charts. By that time Noel Davies had replaced Adolphus on lead guitar. The group issued their final single, "Ain't no Use", in January 1976 but disbanded soon after. Green and the McKinneys briefly formed City Strutt, before continuing with other artists and as session musicians.

Chuck McKinney died in September 1994.

== Discography ==
=== Albums ===
List of albums, with selected details
Title	Album details
Come Together	Released: 1975; Format: CD, Cassette; Label: Wizard Records (ZL 207)

=== Singles ===
- "Come Together" (1974) Wizard Records
- "Time Is on Your Side" (1974) Wizard Records
- "Do What You Wanna Do" (August 1975) Wizard Records - AUS #35
- "Ain't No Use" (January 1976) Wizard Records
