= List of number-one urban singles of 2024 (Australia) =

ARIA Charts number-one urban singles of 2024 < 2023 2025 >

Other Australian number-one charts of 2024
- albums
- singles
- dance singles
- club tracks
- digital tracks
- streaming tracks

Top Australian singles and albums of 2024
- Triple J Hottest 100
- top 25 singles
- top 25 albums

The ARIA Urban Chart is a chart that ranks the best-performing hip hop and R&B tracks of Australia. It is published by the Australian Recording Industry Association (ARIA), an organisation who collect music data for the weekly ARIA Charts. To be eligible to appear on the chart, the recording must be a single of a predominantly urban nature.

== Chart history ==
Issue date	Song	Artist(s)	Reference
1 January	"Lovin On Me"	Jack Harlow	
8 January	"Lovin On Me"	Jack Harlow	
15 January	"Lovin On Me"	Jack Harlow	
22 January	"Lovin On Me"	Jack Harlow	
29 January	"Lovin On Me"	Jack Harlow	
5 February	"Lovin On Me"	Jack Harlow	
12 February	"Lovin On Me"	Jack Harlow	
19 February	"Lovin On Me"	Jack Harlow	
26 February	"Lovin On Me"	Jack Harlow	
4 March	"Lovin On Me"	Jack Harlow	
11 March	"Carnival"	Kanye West and Ty Dolla Sign featuring Rich the Kid and Playboi Carti	
18 March	"Carnival"	Kanye West and Ty Dolla Sign featuring Rich the Kid and Playboi Carti	
25 March	"Carnival"	Kanye West and Ty Dolla Sign featuring Rich the Kid and Playboi Carti	
1 April	"Like That"	Future and Metro Boomin featuring Kendrick Lamar	
8 April	"Like That"	Future and Metro Boomin featuring Kendrick Lamar	
15 April	"Like That"	Future and Metro Boomin featuring Kendrick Lamar	
22 April	"Lovin On Me"	Jack Harlow	
29 April	"Saturn"	SZA	
6 May	"Saturn"	SZA	
13 May	"Million Dollar Baby"	Tommy Richman	
20 May	"Million Dollar Baby"	Tommy Richman	
27 May	"Million Dollar Baby"	Tommy Richman	
3 June	"Million Dollar Baby"	Tommy Richman	
10 June	"Houdini"	Eminem	
17 June	"Houdini"	Eminem	
24 June	"Houdini"	Eminem	
1 July	"Million Dollar Baby"	Tommy Richman	
8 July	"Million Dollar Baby"	Tommy Richman	
15 July	"Not Like Us"	Kendrick Lamar	
22 July	"Houdini"	Eminem	
29 July	"Not Like Us"	Kendrick Lamar	
5 August	"Not Like Us"	Kendrick Lamar	
12 August	"Not Like Us"	Kendrick Lamar	
19 August	"Big Dawgs"	Hanumankind featuring Kalmi	
26 August	"Big Dawgs"	Hanumankind featuring Kalmi	
2 September	"Big Dawgs"	Hanumankind featuring Kalmi	
9 September	"Big Dawgs"	Hanumankind featuring Kalmi	
16 September	"Big Dawgs"	Hanumankind featuring Kalmi	
23 September	"Million Dollar Baby"	Tommy Richman	
30 September	"Million Dollar Baby"	Tommy Richman	
7 October	"Timeless"	The Weeknd and Playboi Carti	
14 October	"Timeless"	The Weeknd and Playboi Carti	
21 October	"Timeless"	The Weeknd and Playboi Carti	
28 October	"Timeless"	The Weeknd and Playboi Carti	
4 November	"Noid"	Tyler, the Creator	
11 November	"Timeless"	The Weeknd and Playboi Carti	
18 November	"Timeless"	The Weeknd and Playboi Carti	
25 November	"Timeless"	The Weeknd and Playboi Carti	
2 December	"Luther"	Kendrick Lamar	
9 December	"Luther"	Kendrick Lamar	
16 December	"Luther"	Kendrick Lamar	
23 December	"Luther"	Kendrick Lamar	
30 December	"Luther"	Kendrick Lamar	

== See also ==
- 2024 in music
- List of number-one singles of 2024 (Australia)
