= Jillposters =

Australian feminist poster group

Jillposters, also known as Jill Posters, were an Australian feminist poster group which formed in Melbourne (Naarm) between 1983 and 1988. They were 'women-only' and one of the founding members was artist Carole Wilson with Deej Fabyc and Julia Church also being a members.

== Background ==
Jillposters formed with no government funding in response to a poster making movement in Australia throughout the 1960s to the 1980s. Posters were seen as an ideal medium for political messages that could be shared broadly and in a way that they would have complete control of the communication process.

The initial members of Jillposters met first in February 1983 at the University of Melbourne student union and each new member contributed $10 to open a bank account for the group and buy supplies. The name Jillposters was selected as a feminist twist on the regulation that 'bill posters will be prosecuted'.

They worked collectively and each poster produced did not include the names of the individuals involved and each is credited to them as a group. This was despite many of the posters being designed and executed individually, Julia Church stated that putting your name on things was seen as ‘bourgeois’ and ‘big-noting yourself’. Additionally there was a range of skills within the group and they had a policy of anti-censorship which meant that members could print and post as they wished to convey a range of concerns.

The first poster they released was to coincide with the 1983 Australian federal election was in support of Bob Hawke and stated that 'A change was as good as a holiday'. Other posters created were anti-apartheid, in support of the Pine Gap Women's Peace Camp, or asked women to reflect on the amount of housework they were doing.

The posters were shared on the streets of Melbourne and the bill posting of these was illegal so members were always at risk of arrest. Some of the posters were taken from the streets and into peoples homes and, after numerous requests from 'left-wing' bookshops in the region to stock them for sale, they also began being sold in retail outlets. Soon after they also began producing them as postcards, badges and calendars and these sales allowed them to be able to print more posters.

From their earliest posters their works were collected by the National Gallery of Australia, Art Gallery of Ballarat and the State Library Victoria.

The final pieces were produced in 1988 and the group wound up.

== Collections and exhibitions ==
As of 2020 works by the collective are included in the Know My Name (exhibition) through the National Gallery of Australia.
