= Home (Good Neighbours song) =

2024 song by Good Neighbours

Single by Good Neighbours

from the EP Good Neighbours and the album Blue Sky Mentality
- Released: 17 January 2024
- Genre: Alternative rock; indie rock
- Length: 2:37
- Label: Some Action
- Songwriters: Oli Fox; Scott Verrill
- Producers: Oli Fox; Scott Verrill

Good Neighbours singles chronology
"Home" (2024)	"Keep It Up" (2024)

Lyric video
- "Home" on YouTube

"Home" is the debut single by British duo Good Neighbours, released on 17 January 2024. The song was teased on TikTok for months leading up to its release, which contributed to its commercial performance. The song charted in a dozen countries, peaking at number 26 in the band's home nation and reaching as high as number 14 in Ireland.

== Background ==
"Home" is the first single in the collaboration between soloists Oli Fox and Scott Verrill, under the name Good Neighbours. Fox previously supported Norwegian singer Sigrid in 2018, while Verrill has released tracks under the pseudonyms Kyko, Kwassa and Good Scott. Verrill was also part of the teenage band Theory of 6 Degrees, collectively one of the youngest aged bands to have played Glastonbury Festival. "Home" debuted in the Official Charts Top 40 Singles Chart on 9 February 2024 and had moved up to number 34 a week later.

== Charts ==
=== Weekly charts ===
Weekly chart performance for "Home"
Chart (2024)	Peak position
Australia (ARIA)	20
Austria (Ö3 Austria Top 40)	37
Canada (Canadian Hot 100)	40
Germany (GfK)	58
Global 200 (Billboard)	89
Ireland (IRMA)	14
Lithuania (AGATA)	90
Netherlands (Single Top 100)	98
New Zealand (Recorded Music NZ)	16
Norway (VG-lista)	23
Sweden (Sverigetopplistan)	68
Switzerland (Schweizer Hitparade)	50
UK Singles (OCC)	26
US Billboard Hot 100	77
US Adult Pop Airplay (Billboard)	29
US Hot Rock & Alternative Songs (Billboard)	9
US Rock Airplay (Billboard)	10

=== Year-end charts ===
Year-end chart performance for "Home"
Chart (2024)	Position
Australia (ARIA)	76
Canada (Canadian Hot 100)	99
New Zealand (Recorded Music NZ)	45
US Hot Rock & Alternative Songs (Billboard)	18
US Rock Airplay (Billboard)	22

== Certifications ==
Certifications for "Home"
Region	Certification	Certified units/sales
Australia (ARIA)	Platinum	70,000^{‡}
Austria (IFPI Austria)	Gold	15,000^{‡}
Belgium (BRMA)	Gold	20,000^{‡}
Brazil (Pro-Música Brasil)	Platinum	40,000^{‡}
Canada (Music Canada)	3× Platinum	240,000^{‡}
New Zealand (RMNZ)	2× Platinum	60,000^{‡}
United Kingdom (BPI)	Platinum	600,000^{‡}
United States (RIAA)	Platinum	1,000,000^{‡}
Streaming
Sweden (GLF)	Gold	6,000,000^{†}
^{‡} Sales+streaming figures based on certification alone.^{†} Streaming-only figures based on certification alone.
