= Good Neighbours (duo) =

English indie rock band

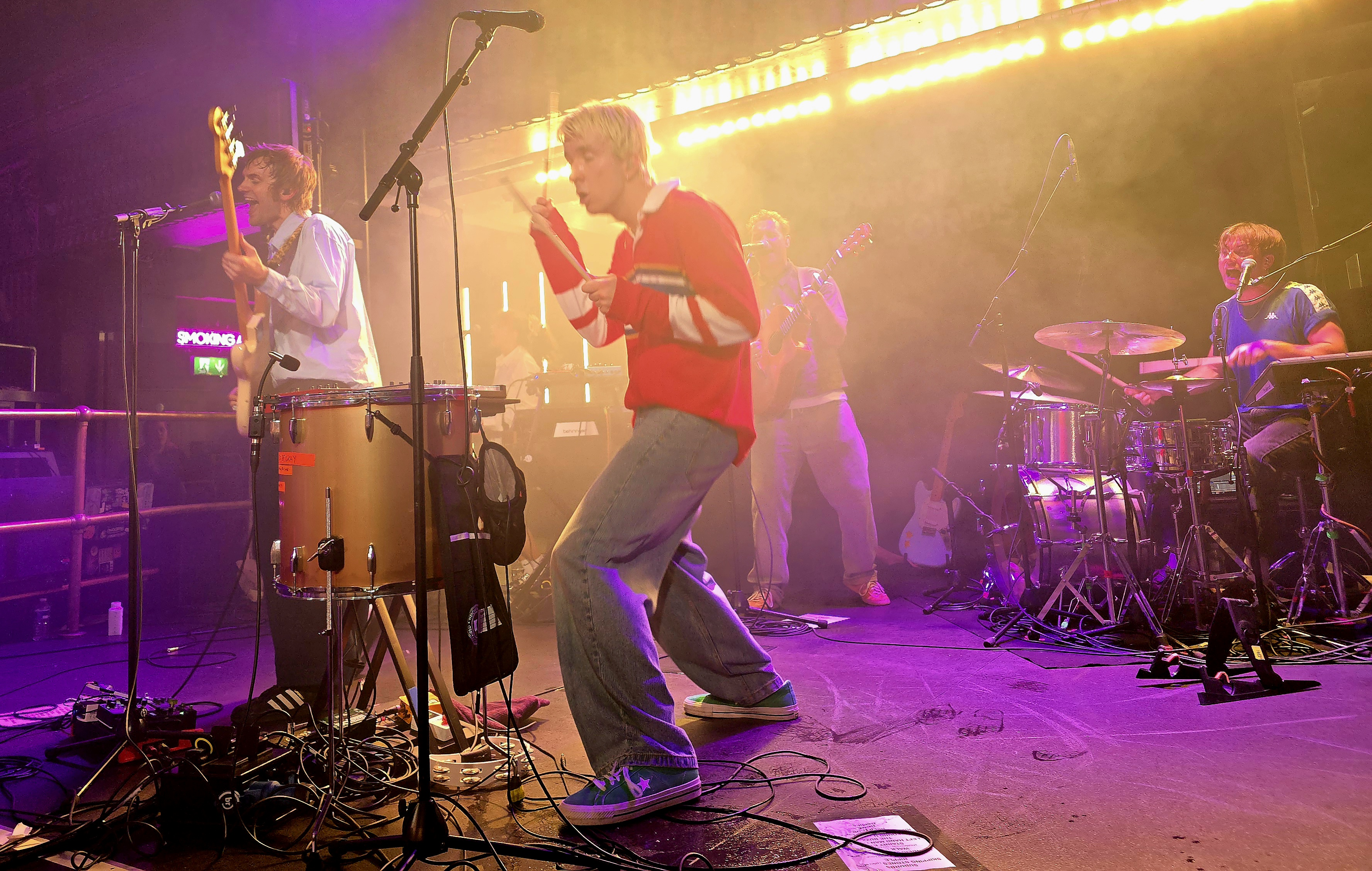
- Good Neighbours in 2025

Background information
- Origin: London, England
- Genres: Indie rock
- Years active: 2024–present
- Label: Polydor
- Members: Oli Fox; Scott Verrill
- Website: wearegoodneighbours.com

Good Neighbours are an English indie rock duo formed in London in 2024, comprising two members: Oli Fox and Scott Verrill. Their debut single and only international hit, "Home", was released on 17 January 2024 to commercial success; peaking at number 26 in the UK.

== Discography ==
=== Studio albums ===
List of extended plays, showing relevant details
Title	Details	Peak chart positions	
Title	Details	UK	SCO
Blue Sky Mentality	Release: 3 October 2025; Label: Polydor; Format: CD, Vinyl, Cassette, Digital download, streaming	24	8

=== Extended plays ===
List of extended plays, showing relevant details
Title	Details
Good Neighbours	Release: 4 October 2024; Label: Polydor; Format: CD, Vinyl, Digital download, streaming
Apple Music Sessions: Good Neighbours	Release: 14 February 2025; Label: Polydor; Format: Streaming

=== Singles ===
List of singles, with selected chart positions and certifications, showing year released and album name
Title	Year	Peak chart positions										Certifications	Album
Title	Year	UK	AUS	AUT	CAN	GER	IRE	NZ	SWE	US	WW	Certifications	Album
"Home"	2024	26	20	37	40	58	14	16	68	77	89	BPI: Platinum; ARIA: Platinum; GLF: Gold; IFPI AUT: Gold; MC: 3× Platinum; RIAA: Platinum; RMNZ: 2× Platinum	Good Neighbours
"Keep It Up"	2024	—	—	—	—	—	—	—	—	—	—		Good Neighbours
"Daisies"	2024	—	—	—	—	—	—	— (Note: "Daisies" did not enter the NZ Top 40 Singles Chart, but peaked at number 40 on the NZ Hot Singles Chart.)	—	—	—		Good Neighbours
"Ripple"	2025	—	—	—	—	—	—	—	—	—	—		Blue Sky Mentality
"Starry Eyed" (solo or featuring Chelsea Cutler)	2025	—	—	—	—	—	—	—	—	—	—		Blue Sky Mentality
"Suburbs"	2025	—	—	—	—	—	—	—	—	—	—		Blue Sky Mentality
"found u/me"	2025	—	—	—	—	—	—	—	—	—	—		Blue Sky Mentality
"People Need People"	2025	—	—	—	—	—	—	—	—	—	—		Blue Sky Mentality
"Superstar"	2026	—	—	—	—	—	—	—	—	—	—		TBA
"Mary Jane"	2026	—	—	—	—	—	—	—	—	—	—		TBA
"—" denotes release did not chart in that territory.

== Music videos ==
Year	Title	Director
2025	"Ripple"	Alex Lockett

== Awards and nominations ==
Organisation	Year	Work	Category	Result
BBC	2025	Good Neighbours	Sound of 2025	Nominated
Brit Awards	2025	Good Neighbours	Rising Star	Nominated
