= List of number-one singles of 2024 (Australia) =

ARIA Charts number-one singles of 2024 < 2023 2025 >

Other Australian number-one charts of 2024
- albums
- urban singles
- dance singles
- club tracks
- digital tracks
- streaming tracks

Top Australian singles and albums of 2024
- Triple J Hottest 100
- top 25 singles
- top 25 albums

The ARIA Singles Chart ranks the best-performing singles in Australia. Its data, published by the Australian Recording Industry Association, is based collectively on the weekly streams and digital and physical sales of singles.

Eighteen songs topped the chart in 2024, with "All I Want for Christmas Is You" by Mariah Carey being number one in a seventh consecutive year, and "Lovin on Me" by Jack Harlow reclaiming the top spot after six weeks at number one in 2023.

Nine artists, Noah Kahan, Benson Boone, Hozier, Sabrina Carpenter, Tommy Richman, Shaboozey, Charli XCX, Rosé and Gracie Abrams, reached the top for the first time.

== Chart history ==
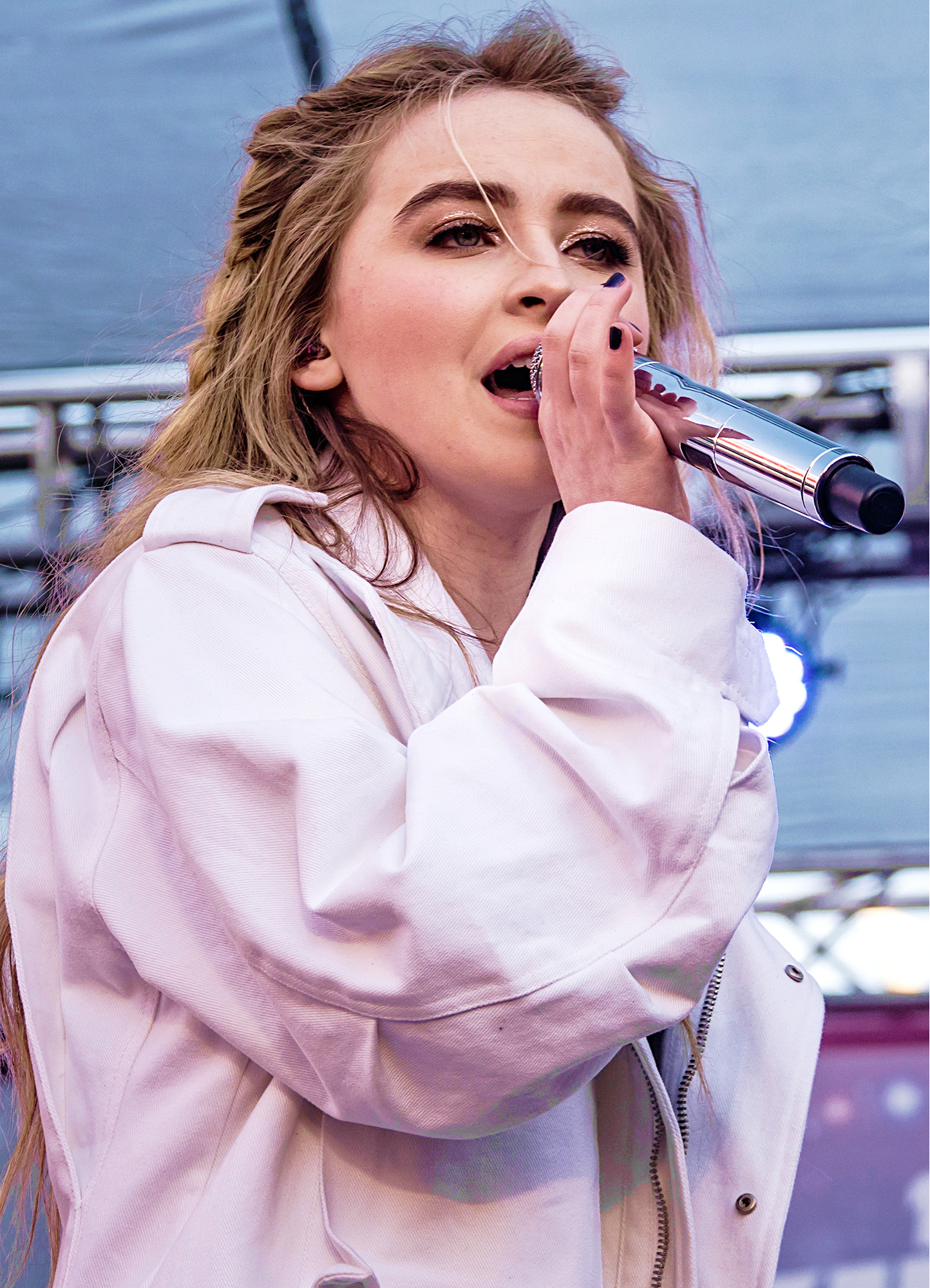
American singer-songwriter Sabrina Carpenter achieved the highest total of eleven weeks with three number-one singles including "Espresso", "Please Please Please", and "Taste".

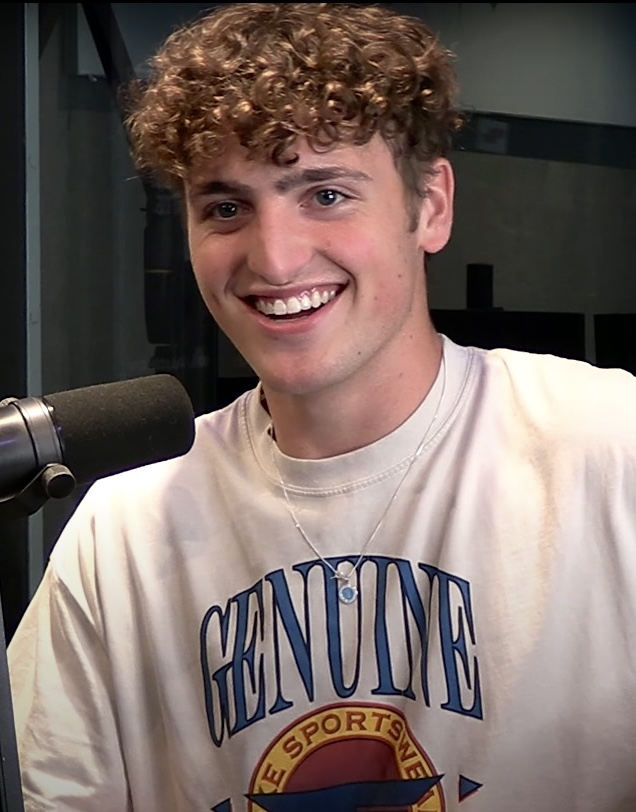
American singer Benson Boone earned his first number-one single with "Beautiful Things", which spent six consecutive weeks atop the ARIA singles chart and became the biggest song in Australia in 2024.

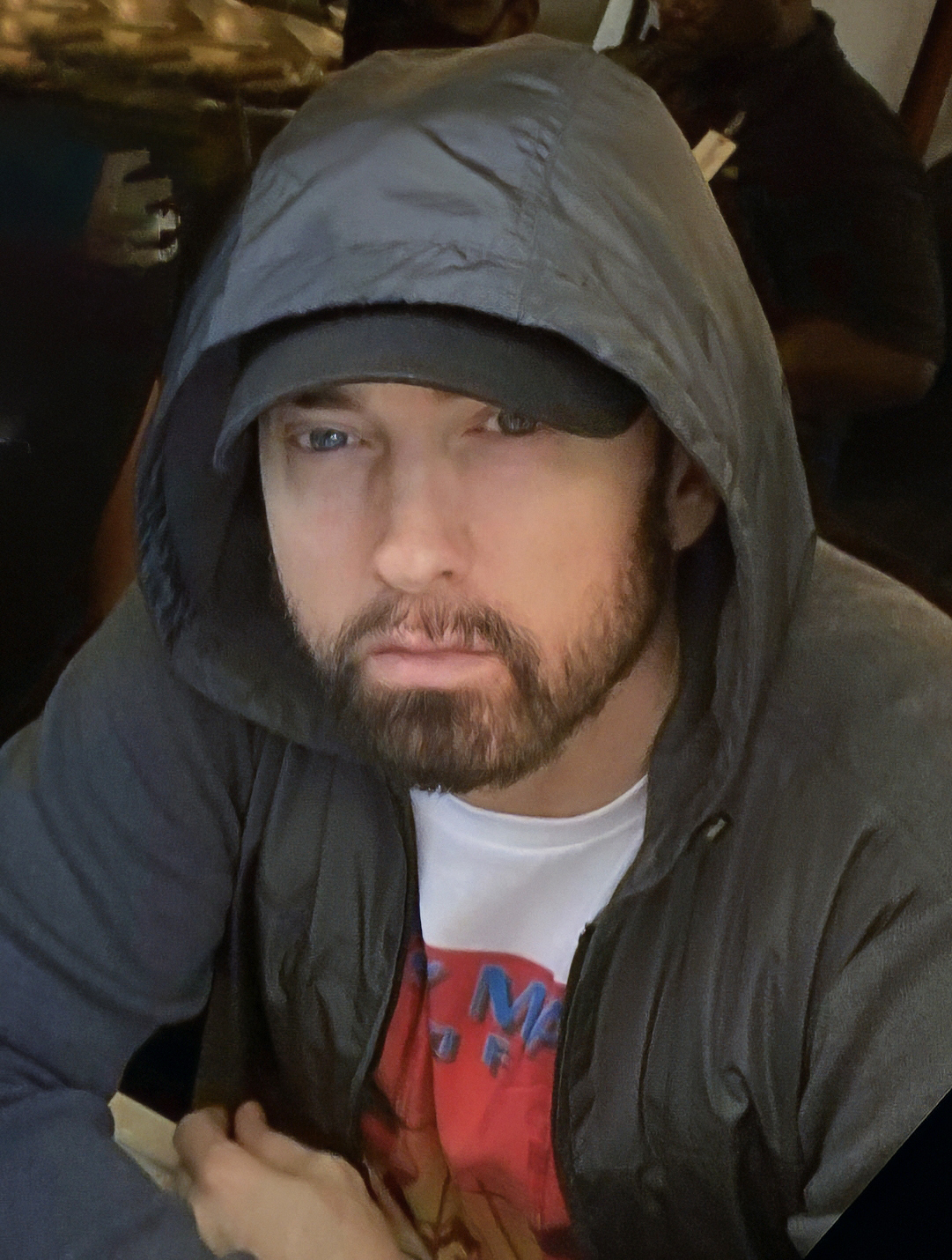
American rapper Eminem debuted at the top of the chart with "Houdini", which held the number-one spot for two consecutive weeks. This marks his first chart-topping single since "The Monster", his 2013 collaboration with Rihanna.

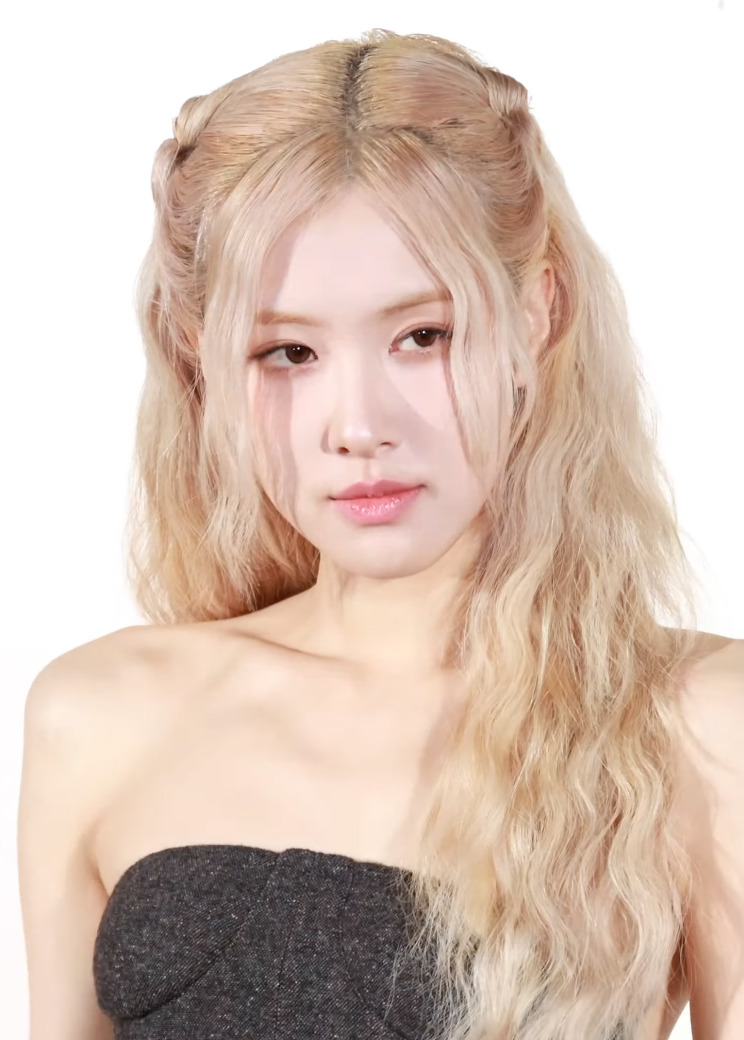
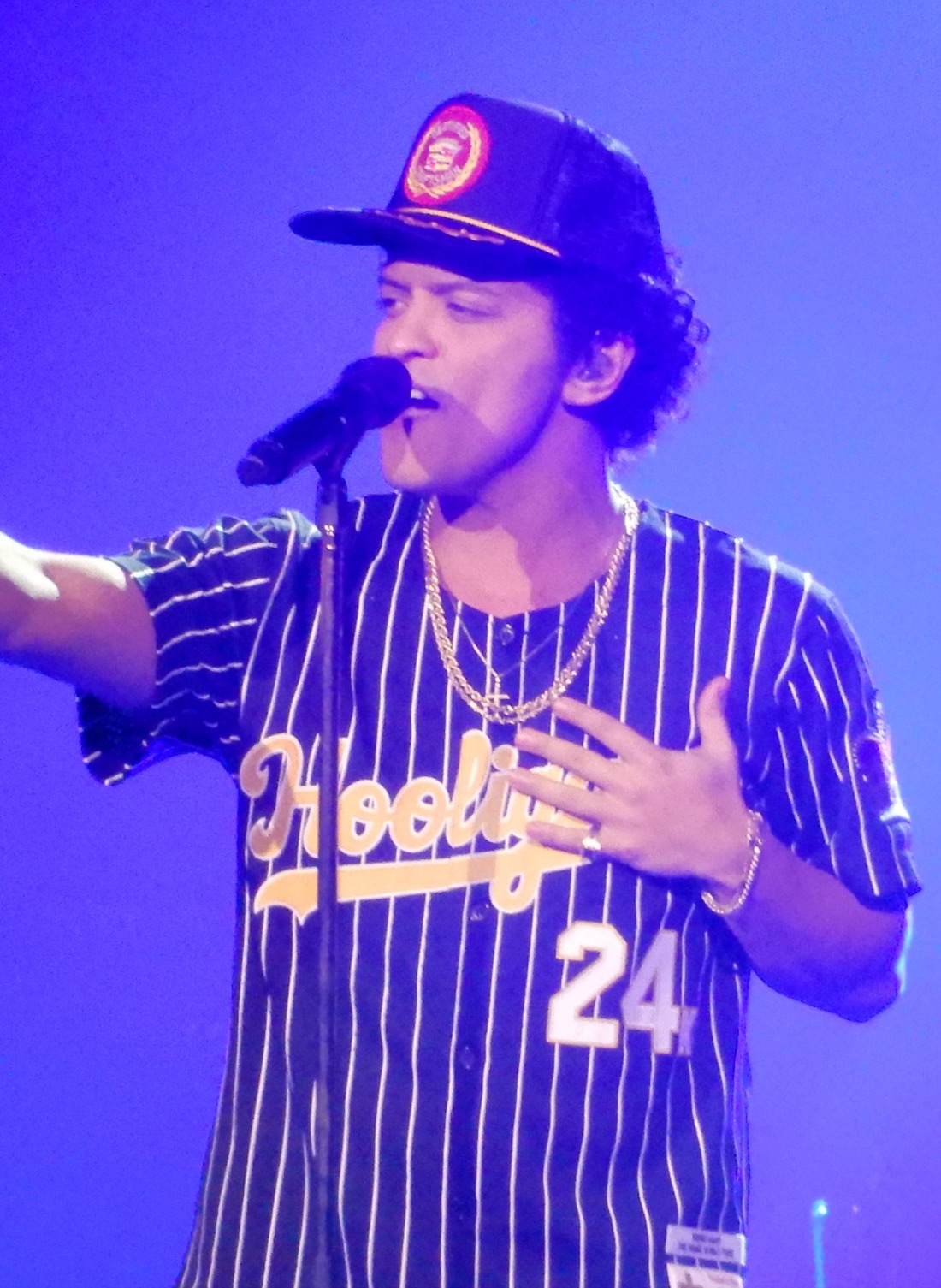
Rosé earned her first number-one as a K-pop soloist with Bruno Mars on their collab hit single "APT.", which topped the singles chart for fourteen non-consecutive weeks (seven in 2024).

Key
†	Indicates best-performing single of 2024

List of number-one singles
Issue date	Song	Artist(s)	Ref.
1 January	"All I Want for Christmas Is You"	Mariah Carey	
8 January	"Lovin on Me"	Jack Harlow	
15 January	"Lovin on Me"	Jack Harlow	
22 January	"Lovin on Me"	Jack Harlow	
29 January	"Lovin on Me"	Jack Harlow	
5 February	"Stick Season"	Noah Kahan	
12 February	"Stick Season"	Noah Kahan	
19 February	"Stick Season"	Noah Kahan	
26 February	"Cruel Summer"	Taylor Swift	
4 March	"Cruel Summer"	Taylor Swift	
11 March	"Beautiful Things" †	Benson Boone	
18 March	"Beautiful Things" †	Benson Boone	
25 March	"Beautiful Things" †	Benson Boone	
1 April	"Beautiful Things" †	Benson Boone	
8 April	"Beautiful Things" †	Benson Boone	
15 April	"Beautiful Things" †	Benson Boone	
22 April	"Too Sweet"	Hozier	
29 April	"Fortnight"	Taylor Swift featuring Post Malone	
6 May	"Fortnight"	Taylor Swift featuring Post Malone	
13 May	"Espresso"	Sabrina Carpenter	
20 May	"I Had Some Help"	Post Malone featuring Morgan Wallen	
27 May	"Million Dollar Baby"	Tommy Richman	
3 June	"Million Dollar Baby"	Tommy Richman	
10 June	"Houdini"	Eminem	
17 June	"Houdini"	Eminem	
24 June	"Please Please Please"	Sabrina Carpenter	
1 July	"Please Please Please"	Sabrina Carpenter	
8 July	"A Bar Song (Tipsy)"	Shaboozey	
15 July	"A Bar Song (Tipsy)"	Shaboozey	
22 July	"A Bar Song (Tipsy)"	Shaboozey	
29 July	"A Bar Song (Tipsy)"	Shaboozey	
5 August	"A Bar Song (Tipsy)"	Shaboozey	
12 August	"Guess"	Charli XCX featuring Billie Eilish	
19 August	"Birds of a Feather"	Billie Eilish	
26 August	"Birds of a Feather"	Billie Eilish	
2 September	"Taste"	Sabrina Carpenter	
9 September	"Taste"	Sabrina Carpenter	
16 September	"Taste"	Sabrina Carpenter	
23 September	"Taste"	Sabrina Carpenter	
30 September	"Taste"	Sabrina Carpenter	
7 October	"Taste"	Sabrina Carpenter	
14 October	"Taste"	Sabrina Carpenter	
21 October	"Taste"	Sabrina Carpenter	
28 October	"APT."	Rosé and Bruno Mars	
4 November	"APT."	Rosé and Bruno Mars	
11 November	"APT."	Rosé and Bruno Mars	
18 November	"That's So True"	Gracie Abrams	
25 November	"That's So True"	Gracie Abrams	
2 December	"APT."	Rosé and Bruno Mars	
9 December	"APT."	Rosé and Bruno Mars	
16 December	"APT."	Rosé and Bruno Mars	
23 December	"APT."	Rosé and Bruno Mars	
30 December	"All I Want for Christmas Is You"	Mariah Carey	

== Number-one artists ==
List of number-one artists, with total weeks spent at number one shown
Position	Artist	Weeks at No. 1
1	Sabrina Carpenter	11
2	Rosé	7
2	Bruno Mars	7
3	Benson Boone	6
4	Shaboozey	5
5	Jack Harlow	4
5	Taylor Swift	4
6	Noah Kahan	3
6	Post Malone	3
6	Billie Eilish	3
7	Tommy Richman	2
7	Eminem	2
7	Gracie Abrams	2
7	Mariah Carey	2
8	Hozier	1
8	Morgan Wallen	1
8	Charli XCX	1

== See also ==
- 2024 in music
- List of number-one albums of 2024 (Australia)
