= Nimino =

British musician and DJ

- Born: Milo Evans
- Years active: 2018–present
- Website: https://beacons.ai/niminomusic

Nimino (pronounced nih-mee-no), born Milo Evans, is a British producer and DJ. Nimino's music sits in the intersection of house, hip-hop, and garage music.

== Career ==
His first single and EP releases were in 2018.

In 2024, Nimino signed with Ninja Tune's Counter Records imprint.

His breakout single "I Only Smoke When I Drink" was "one of the biggest dance releases of summer 2024". The song was remixed by Claptone and placed at number 62 on the Triple J Hottest 100, 2024.

In 2025, he has released the singles "Shaking Things Up" and "Beside Of Me" featuring Maverick Sabre.

He describes "Opening Credits" (2022), "Save a Soul" (2022), and "No Sympathy" (2023) as "pillars of his sets".

== Discography ==
=== Singles ===
List of singles as a lead artist, with selected chart positions and certifications, showing year released and album name
Title	Year	Peak chart positions							Certifications	Album
Title	Year	UK	AUS	IRE	NZ Hot	PRY Ang. Air.	US Dance/ Elec.	URY Ang. Air.	Certifications	Album
"I Only Smoke When I Drink"	2024	48	99	84	—	—	15	—	BPI: Gold	Creek
"Better" (featuring Manta)	2025	—	—	—	21	15	—	13		TBA
"Rest Easy"	2025	—	—	—	—	—	—	—		TBA
"—" denotes recording did not chart in that territory.
