= Deej Fabyc =

UK-Australian performance artist (born 1960)

- Born: 1961; London, England
- Education: Southern Cross University University of New South Wales
- Known for: performance art, installation art, video
- Website: fabyc.co.uk

Deej Fabyc (born 1961) is a British-born, Australian performance video and installation artist. Fabyc is a former member of art collectives including Jillposters in Melbourne, FBI+ in London, and Elastic Residence in London. They were a member of the Bitumen River Gallery in Canberra, Australia.

Their work has been shown at Artspace, Sydney, the El Museo del Barrio, the National Gallery of Victoria, the Reina Sofia Museum, and the Whitechapel Gallery.Their work deals with three primary themes: gender, space and "forensic biography." It has been described, by the art writer Robert Preece, as being "demanding, aggressively thought-provoking, and sometimes shocking in its raw content."

During the past 30 years, they have held roles in education, curating, and project management, and are currently the CEO of Live Art Ireland.

== Early life and education ==
Fabyc was born in London and raised as a young child in England and Ireland. They attended secondary school in Australia. Fabyc went on to receive a BFA from Southern Cross University, and then earned an MFA degree at the University of New South Wales in the art and design program.

Fabyc lived in Ljubjana for a few months as a child in 1970 with their family, while their father worked as a consultant statistician under the Tito administration. Fabyc used their childhood memories of this period in their work as artist in residence at KUD Mreža in Ljubjana.

== Career ==
Fabyc has worked in education, teaching performance and fine art, for over 20 years, including in higher education, the community sector and prison system. Fabyc is currently a faculty member and lecturer at the School of Art, Media and Design at London Metropolitan University, London.

Fabyc is the founding director of Elastic Residence in London, a production house and gallery space for performance and projects established in 2004.

Fabyc is the Executive Director of Live Art Ireland - Elain Bheo Centre for Art Research and Development, located at Milford House in North Tipperary, Ireland.

Fabyc has held residencies at Artsadmin, London, the Dartington School of Art in Devon, the Cite Internationale des Arts in Paris, and A Space Gallery in Southhampton.

== Collections and public art ==
Their public art work Gateway to Mag Mell, is in the Home of the Arts (HOTA) Sculpture Park in Queensland, Australia.

Their work is held in the permanent collection of the National Gallery of Australia (NGA) in Canberra.

More recently, Fabyc's performance art includes the 2022 group performance One-Body at the Highlanes Gallery in Drogheda as part of artist group Bbeyond, and Rerooting Tallaght at the Rua Red Gallery in Dublin in 2024.

== Key Works ==
Sucking at the Sublime (1994), a 3-day performance installation created in a domestic space, commissioned by Nick Waterlow.

The White Room (1995–1998) a performance installation first shown in Sydney, then presented at the Experimental Art Foundation in Adelaide in 1997.

Fabyc's work was featured in the 1996 book Lesbian Art: An Encounter with Power by Elizabeth Ashburn, which documented the works of several lesbian artists in Australia.
