= Cave (Dom Dolla and Tove Lo song) =

2024 single by Dom Dolla and Tove Lo

Single by Dom Dolla and Tove Lo
- Released: 11 October 2024
- Length: 3:00
- Label: Three Six Zero; Sony Music
- Songwriters: Dominic Matheson, Tove Lo
- Producer: Dom Dolla

Dom Dolla singles chronology
"Girls" (2023)	"Cave" (2024)	"Dreamin'" (2025)

Tove Lo singles chronology
"My Oh My" (2024)	"Cave" (2024)	"I'm Your Girl Right?" (2026)

"Cave" is a song by Australian record producer Dom Dolla and Swedish singer Tove Lo released on 11 October 2024.

The song polled at number 14 on the Triple J Hottest 100, 2024.

At the APRA Music Awards of 2026, the song was nominated for Most Performed Dance/Electronic Work.

== Critical reception ==
Peter Volpe from EDM Maniac said "Complete with silky rolling drums and swollen low-end sub-bass, the liquid drum & bass tune marks a departure from the tech house and pop music stylings the Aussie house artist and superstar Swedish singer-songwriter are respectively known for, as global demand for the high-speed genre continues to swell."

== Versions ==
Digital download

- "Cave" – 3:00
- "Cave" (Partyboi69 & X CLUB mix) – 3:11

== Charts ==
Weekly chart performance for "Cave"
Chart (2024–2025)	Peak position
Australia Club Tracks (ARIA)	39
Czech Republic Airplay (ČNS IFPI)	43
New Zealand Hot Singles (RMNZ)	9
US Hot Dance/Electronic Songs (Billboard)	29

== Certifications ==
Certifications for "Cave"
Region	Certification	Certified units/sales
Australia (ARIA)	Gold	35,000^{‡}
^{‡} Sales+streaming figures based on certification alone.
