= Julia Church =

Australian artist

Julia Church (born 25 October 1959 in London, England) is a British-born Australian artist and has works in painting, printmaking, poster art and graphic design. She is also an author, having written many books and journal articles on Australian women's art and artistic culture. Her work is held in the collection of the National Gallery of Australia.

== Early life and education ==
Julia Church was born in England on 25 October 1959. She lived in London for the first 10 years of her life until her family moved to Australia in 1969.

In 1977, Church attended the Australian National University and achieved a Diploma of Art, majoring in photomedia at Canberra School of Art from 1979 to 1981.

== Career ==
Since 1981, Church has been a member of several print workshops and collectives such as Acme Ink in Canberra in 1981, Bloody Good Graffix, and Jillposters forming in Melbourne in 1983, as well as Another Planet Posters forming in Melbourne in 1985. Her practice is based mainly in screen printing and printmaking.

After being awarded an Australia Council Travel Grant, Church spent six months travelling and creating in Europe, and settled in Italy in 1990.

She is still active today.

== Art works ==
- Blind dates calendar 1982 (women), 1981, screen print, 42.8 x 32.8 cm.
- Canberra Youth Theatre's Troupe presents Treatment.Directed by Gail Kelly, 1981, screen print.
- Names witheld., 1981, screen print.
- Dim your headlights, 1981–83, screen print, 102 x 65 cm.
- Double dissolution, 1982, screen print.
- SuperDoreen, 1982, screen print.
- Fools Gallery Theatre presents: Original sin., 1982, screen print.
- Superdor-een (Yip)., 1982, screen print.
- Superdoreen is Miss Galaxy, 1982, screen print.
- Superdoreen asks: 'dear, do you lack confidence?', 1982, screen print.
- Superdor-een.presents An Exhibition of Canberra Women artists. 'The Women and Arts Festival', 1982, screen print.
- V.I.R.G.I.N. Press, 1982, screen print.
- Women's Weekly, c.1982, screen print.
- Beat, Australian pop and rock culture 1958-1984, 1983, screen print.
- The Garden State. ... Choking to death in Fitzroy. A true air-pollution epic, 1983, screen print.
- Lest we forget, 1983, screen print.
- A nuclear war for a radiation suntan, 1984, screen print.
- Life ... in the nuclear firing line, 1984, screen print.
- Postcard: Aloha from St Kilda, 1984, screen print.
- Technical skills are out of this world!, 1984, screen print.
- This is the way the world ends, not with a bang but a whimper. Stop uranium mining, 1984, screen print.
- Who cares for childcare workers?, 1984, screen print.
- Sacred object, 1987, screen print.
- Lizard dresses, 1988, screen print.
- L'egalite, la liberte, la surete, la propriete for all indigenous people in the Pacific, 1989.
- Peace Concert for victims of the Gulf war, 1991.

== Exhibitions ==
- The Last Ten Years of Australian Art, Australian National Gallery, 1982.
- Last Five Years of Womens Posters, Bitumen River Gallery, 1982.
- Images of Women Prints and Drawings of the Twentieth Century, University of Melbourne Art Gallery, 1983.
- Eighth British International Print Biennale, Cartwright Hall, 1984.
- Post-Atomic Card Show, Australia wide, 1984.
- Gallery 7 Serigraphy Collection, Australian National Gallery, 1985.
- With the Imprint of Another Culture, Print Council of Australia Gallery and Fine Arts Gallery (Hobart), 1988 and 1990.
- [Untitled], Linden Gallery, 1991.
- A little beastiary: Works on paper by Julia Church, aGOG, 1991.
- Right Here Right Now Australia, 1988–1998.

== Publications ==
Church has also written many books and journal articles on Australian women's art and artistic culture.

=== Books ===
- Melbourne : our city, our culture : profiling a city's arts and cultural achievements, 1995.
- Per lʹAustralia : the story of Italian migration, 2005–2006.
- True bird grit : a book about Canberra women in the arts 1982-83, coauthored with Alison Alder, 1983.
- An ear, an eye and a heart : Footscray Community Arts Centre in words and pictures, coauthored with Lin Tobais, 1992.
- Pressing issues : contemporary posters from local co-operative presses, 1990.
- A little bestiary works on paper, 1991.

=== Journal articles ===
- Fighting fire with fire: cultural movements, Can News, no.5, Mar 1988, p. 6-11.
- Ladies and bagpipes: the 'world's greatest novelty' [The history of the Australian Scottish Ladies Pipe Band], Memento (Canberra, A.C.T.), no.38, Jan 2010, p. 10-12.
- Greener than green, challenging the advertising myth. -Ecover's recycled advertising campaign for soap powder in Great Britain-, Habitat Australia, v.21, no.1, Feb 1993, p. 48-52.
- Somebody's daughter. -Melbourne theatre company whose members are predominantly ex prisoners from Fairlea Women's Prison-, OZ Arts Magazine, no.3, July/ Sept 1992, p. 68-71.
- Truth rules II: Experimental Art Foundation: February/ March 1986. -A review of an exhibition of political posters-, Artlink, v.6, no.1, Apr 1986, p. 3-5.
- Seagrass story: community theatre and conservation, Habitat Australia, v.19, no.6, Dec 1991, p. 24-28.

=== Posters ===
- Eden pair in computer dating scandal! : a handpainted calendar, 1982.

== Collections ==
Church's work is held in the following permanent public collection:

- National Gallery of Australia, Canberra
