= Backbone (Chase & Status and Stormzy song) =

Single by Chase & Status and Stormzy
- Released: 8 August 2024
- Length: 2:46
- Label: EMI
- Songwriters: Michael Omari; Saul Milton; William Kennard
- Producers: Chase & Status

Chase & Status singles chronology
"Gunfinger (Salute)" (2024)	"Backbone" (2024)

Stormzy singles chronology
"Cry No More" (2024)	"Backbone" (2024)

Music video
- "Backbone" on YouTube

"Backbone" is a song by British electronic music duo Chase & Status and rapper Stormzy. It was released on 8 August 2024 through EMI Records. After having been performed several times in the months leading up to the release, the song marks the first time the two acts have collaborated on record. "Backbone" entered at the top of the UK Singles Chart. Outside the United Kingdom, "Backbone" peaked within the top 10 of the charts of New Zealand. It also peaked at number 11 in Malaysia on 31 August 2024.

== Background and composition ==
The song was first performed as part of the band's Coachella set in April 2024 and again later at the Ushuaïa Ibiza Beach Hotel in June. It was further teased across a string of festival dates that summer. In a statement, Chase & Status expressed how "gassed" they were to collaborate with the "legend that is Stormzy", revealing that they always wanted to "bring his energy" into their world.

"Backbone" merges the "signature high-energy beats" of Chase & Status and Stormzy's "powerful and commanding lyricism" into an "electrifying anthem" as a clash of "two musical titans from different genres".

== Music video ==
An accompanying music video was filmed during a surprise performance at the Ushuaïa Ibiza Beach Hotel on 30 June 2024 and released alongside the song on 8 August.

== Charts ==
=== Weekly charts ===
Weekly chart performance for "Backbone"
Chart (2024–2025)	Peak position
Australia (ARIA)	36
Australia Dance (ARIA)	1
Czech Republic Singles Digital (ČNS IFPI)	84
Ireland (IRMA)	54
Latvia Airplay (TopHit)	51
Lithuania Airplay (TopHit)	8
New Zealand (Recorded Music NZ)	3
Slovakia Singles Digital (ČNS IFPI)	88
UK Singles (OCC)	1
UK Dance (OCC)	1

=== Monthly charts ===
Monthly chart performance for "Backbone"
Chart (2024)	Peak position
Latvia Airplay (TopHit)	53

=== Year-end charts ===
2024 year-end chart performance for "Backbone"
Chart (2024)	Position
UK Singles (OCC)	64

2025 year-end chart performance for "Backbone"
Chart (2025)	Position
New Zealand (Recorded Music NZ)	50

== Certifications ==
Certifications for "Backbone"
Region	Certification	Certified units/sales
New Zealand (RMNZ)	Gold	15,000^{‡}
United Kingdom (BPI)	Gold	400,000^{‡}
^{‡} Sales+streaming figures based on certification alone.
