= Triple J's Hottest 100 of 2024 =

32nd annual Australian music poll

2024 Triple J Hottest 100

Countdown details
- Date of countdown: 25 January 2025
- Charity partner: We Are Mobilise
- Votes cast: 2,489,446

Countdown highlights
- Winning song: Chappell Roan "Good Luck, Babe!"
- Most entries: Billie Eilish; Charli XCX (8 tracks each)

Chronology
← Previous; 2023	Next → Australian Songs (2025)

The 2024 Triple J Hottest 100 was broadcast on 25 January 2025. It was the 32nd annual countdown of the most popular songs of the year, as voted by listeners of Australian youth radio station Triple J. Two days later, on 27 January, the station announced the Hottest 200, counting down songs 200–101. Merchandise sales from the event will support homelessness charity, We Are Mobilise.

Chappell Roan's "Good Luck, Babe!" was voted in at number one on the countdown, receiving the most number of votes in the history of the Hottest 100. Meanwhile, Billie Eilish and Charli XCX scored the most entries, with eight each, breaking G Flip's record from the previous countdown. Over 2.4 million votes were counted.

== Background ==
The 2023 Triple J Hottest 100 culminated with "Paint the Town Red" by Doja Cat taking out the number one position. Meanwhile, Australian multi-instrumentalist G Flip secured seven tracks in the countdown, including number two with "The Worst Person Alive", setting the all-time record for most entries in a single Hottest 100.

For songs to be eligible in the 2024 countdown, they must have been released between 1 December 2023 and 30 November 2024. Voting began on 10 December 2024, and will end on 20 January 2025. Listeners can vote for up to ten songs. The official artwork for the 2024 countdown was created by West Sydney 3D artist Serwah Attafuah, who was influenced by Renaissance and Afrofuturist stylings.

== Predictions ==
In November 2024, Australian online bookmaker Sportsbet was favouring five key songs, with the lowest odds for "Good Luck, Babe!" by Chappell Roan and "Birds of a Feather" by Billie Eilish—both artists from the United States. Meanwhile, men's magazine GQ predicted that "Not Like Us" by American rapper Kendrick Lamar would take out the number-one position. Other frontrunners included Royel Otis' Like a Version cover of "Murder on the Dancefloor" and Charli XCX's "Guess". In articles written before the countdown, some music journalists wrote of their concern over the possible lack of Australian music at the top of the countdown, when "One Bad Day" by Spacey Jane was projected to be the only original Australian song in the top 10. On 9 January 2025, Triple J announced that two songs in the top five were separated by only 0.05% of the total votes.

== Full list ==
Note: Australian artists

#	Song	Artist	Country of origin
1	Good Luck, Babe!	Chappell Roan	United States
2	Murder on the Dancefloor (Like a Version)	Royel Otis	Australia
3	Birds of a Feather	Billie Eilish	United States
4	Messy	Lola Young	United Kingdom
5	That's So True	Gracie Abrams	United States
6	Guess	Charli XCX featuring Billie Eilish	United Kingdom/United States
7	Girls	Dom Dolla	Australia
8	Not Like Us	Kendrick Lamar	United States
9	Cruel Summer (Like a Version)	G Flip	Australia
10	Leavemealone	Fred Again and Baby Keem	United Kingdom/United States
11	Diet Pepsi	Addison Rae	United States
12	Places to Be	Fred Again, Anderson .Paak and Chika	United Kingdom/United States
13	Backbone	Chase & Status and Stormzy	United Kingdom
14	Cave	Dom Dolla and Tove Lo	Australia/Sweden
15	Tangerine	Ocean Alley	Australia
16	Sailor Song	Gigi Perez	United States
17	Lunch	Billie Eilish	United States
18	One Bad Day	Spacey Jane	Australia
19	A Bar Song (Tipsy)	Shaboozey	United States
20	Apple	Charli XCX	United Kingdom
21	I Like the Way You Kiss Me	Artemas	United Kingdom
22	I Love You, I'm Sorry	Gracie Abrams	United States
23	Girls	The Kid Laroi	Australia
24	Misses	Dominic Fike	United States
25	I Had Some Help	Post Malone featuring Morgan Wallen	United States
26	Girl, So Confusing	Charli XCX and Lorde	United Kingdom/New Zealand
27	Wildflower	Billie Eilish	United States
28	365	Charli XCX	United Kingdom
29	Saturn	SZA	United States
30	Sticky	Tyler, the Creator featuring GloRilla, Sexyy Red and Lil Wayne	United States
31	Talk Talk	Charli XCX featuring Troye Sivan	United Kingdom/Australia
32	Jerkin'	Amyl and the Sniffers	Australia
33	Chihiro	Billie Eilish	United States
34	U Should Not Be Doing That	Amyl and the Sniffers	Australia
35	360	Charli XCX	United Kingdom
36	Von Dutch	Charli XCX	United Kingdom
37	Obsessed	Olivia Rodrigo	United States
38	What You've Lost	Old Mervs	Australia
39	Heading for the Door	Royel Otis	Australia
40	Million Dollar Baby	Tommy Richman	United States
41	It's OK I'm OK	Tate McRae	Canada
42	Denial Is a River	Doechii	United States
43	Like Love	Ball Park Music	Australia
44	Foam	Royel Otis	Australia
45	Close to You	Gracie Abrams	United States
46	Physical Medicine	The Rions	Australia
47	2 Hands	Tate McRae	Canada
48	Starburster	Fontaines D.C.	Ireland
49	Risk	Gracie Abrams	United States
50	Baby I'm Back	The Kid Laroi	Australia
51	Sexy to Someone	Clairo	United States
52	Home	Good Neighbours	United Kingdom
53	Kool-Aid	Bring Me the Horizon	United Kingdom
54	Juna	Clairo	United States
55	L'Amour de Ma Vie	Billie Eilish	United States
56	Luther	Kendrick Lamar and SZA	United States
57	Homesick	Noah Kahan and Sam Fender	United States/United Kingdom
58	Music Is Better	Rüfüs Du Sol	Australia
59	The Greatest	Billie Eilish	United States
60	Cold Treatment	Lime Cordiale	Australia
61	Passionfruit	The Rions	Australia
62	I Only Smoke When I Drink	Nimino	United Kingdom
63	Texas Hold 'Em	Beyoncé	United States
64	Training Season	Dua Lipa	United Kingdom/Albania
65	Lithonia	Childish Gambino	United States
66	One of Your Girls (Like a Version)	Missy Higgins	Australia
67	A Little Closer	Diffrent	Germany
68	Favourite	Fontaines D.C.	Ireland
69	Let's Go Back	Jungle	United Kingdom
70	She's Gone, Dance On	Disclosure	United Kingdom
71	Us	Gracie Abrams featuring Taylor Swift	United States
72	A Tear in Space (Airlock)	Glass Animals	United Kingdom
73	Creatures in Heaven	Glass Animals	United Kingdom
74	It Boy	bbno$	Canada
75	Calling After Me	Wallows	United States
76	Lucy	Pacific Avenue	Australia
77	Run for the Hills	Tate McRae	Canada
78	The Feminine Urge	The Last Dinner Party	United Kingdom
79	Black Balloon	The Rubens	Australia
80	Break My Love	Rüfüs Du Sol	Australia
81	Darling, I	Tyler, the Creator featuring Teezo Touchdown	United States
82	Ratatata	Babymetal and Electric Callboy	Japan/Germany
83	People Watching	Sam Fender	United Kingdom
84	St. Chroma	Tyler, the Creator featuring Daniel Caesar	United States/Canada
85	Timeless	The Weeknd and Playboi Carti	Canada/United States
86	If Our Love Is Dead	Royel Otis	Australia
87	Lately	Rüfüs Du Sol	Australia
88	Boost Up	Fisher and Flowdan	Australia/United Kingdom
89	Enough of the Sweet Talk	Lime Cordiale	Australia
90	Euphoria	Kendrick Lamar	United States
91	Band4Band	Central Cee and Lil Baby	United Kingdom/United States
92	Blue	Billie Eilish	United States
93	Club Classics	Charli XCX	United Kingdom
94	Ocean	Fisher and Ar/Co	Australia/United Kingdom
95	Redrum	21 Savage	United States/United Kingdom
96	Nissan Altima	Doechii	United States
97	TV Off	Kendrick Lamar featuring Lefty Gunplay	United States
98	Top 10 Statues That Cried Blood	Bring Me the Horizon	United Kingdom
99	Iluv	Effy and Mall Grab	United Kingdom/Australia
100	Type Shit	Future, Metro Boomin, Travis Scott and Playboi Carti	United States

=== #101–200 list ===
On 27 January 2025, Triple J announced the songs that made the #101–200 positions.

#	Song	Artist	Country of origin
101	Untangling	Angie McMahon	Australia
102	Givin' It Up	South Summit	Australia
103	Reckless (Like a Version)	Angie McMahon	Australia
104	Go Back	John Summit and Sub Focus featuring Julia Church	United States/United Kingdom/South Africa
105	Parched	Old Mervs	Australia
106	Sympathy is a knife	Charli XCX and Ariana Grande	United Kingdom/United States
107	Freckles	Thelma Plum	Australia
108	Damager	Sammy Virji and Interplanetary Criminal	United Kingdom
109	Cinderella	Remi Wolf	United States
110	Claw Foot	Royel Otis	Australia
111	Strangers	Lime Cordiale	Australia
112	Secret	Peach PRC	Australia
113	Chewing Gum	Amyl and the Sniffers	Australia
114	Miss You Still	Allday featuring Cub Sport	Australia
115	Stayinit	Fred Again, Lil Yachty and Overmono	United Kingdom/United States
116	Base Camp	Hockey Dad	Australia
117	Changes	Empire of the Sun	Australia
118	Sorry I'm Late, I Didn't Want to Come	The Wombats	United Kingdom
119	Safety Pin	Hockey Dad	Australia
120	Squabble Up	Kendrick Lamar	United States
121	Noid	Tyler, the Creator	United States
122	Quick to Judge	Dice	Australia
123	Hind's Hall	Macklemore	United States
124	Blowing Smoke	Gracie Abrams	United States
125	Sweet Cocoon	The Rions	Australia
126	Wreck and Ruin	Hockey Dad	Australia
127	Nobody's Baby	Thelma Plum	Australia
128	Forget It	Old Mervs	Australia
129	Beaches	Beabadoobee	United Kingdom/Philippines
130	Peeps with the Goods	The Dreggs	Australia
131	Til the Morning	Royel Otis	Australia
132	Aquamarine	Addison Rae	United States
133	Deeply Still in Love	Role Model	United States
134	Shiver	John Summit and Hayla	United States/United Kingdom
135	Neverender	Justice and Tame Impala	France/Australia
136	Weather's Better	Rum Jungle	Australia
137	Nights Like This Pt 2	The Kid Laroi	Australia
138	Illusion	Dua Lipa	United Kingdom/Albania
139	Real Man	Beabadoobee	United Kingdom/Philippines
140	I Can't Lose You	Confidence Man	Australia
141	The Big Reveal; Ou L'Hypocrite	Lime Cordiale	Australia
142	Gimme the Wrench	Slowly Slowly	Australia
143	High Beaming	Skegss	Australia
144	Peace U Need	Fred Again and Joy Anonymous	United Kingdom
145	Your Apartment	Wallows	United States
146	For Cryin' Out Loud!	Finneas	United States
147	Image	Magdalena Bay	United States
148	Never Lose Me	Flo Milli	United States
149	Dancing in the Flames	The Weeknd	Canada
150	Hurricane	Thelma Plum	Australia
151	King	Baker Boy	Australia
152	Take a Bite	Beabadoobee	United Kingdom/Philippines
153	Time of My Life	Peach PRC	Australia
154	Youtopia	Bring Me the Horizon	United Kingdom
155	We're Not Alike	Tate McRae	Canada
156	Push 2 Start	Tyla	South Africa
157	Me and the Girls	Amyl and the Sniffers	Australia
158	Aperol Spritz	The Kid Laroi	Australia
159	Big Dawgs	Hanumankind and Kalmi	India
160	Somedays (song)	Sonny Fodera, Jazzy and D.O.D	Australia/Ireland/United Kingdom
161	I Will Survive (Like a Version)	Dice	Australia
162	Limousine	Bring Me the Horizon featuring Aurora	United Kingdom/Norway
163	Lifetime	Tobiahs	Australia
164	Baddy on the Floor	Jamie xx featuring Honey Dijon	United Kingdom/United States
165	Add Up My Love	Clairo	United States
166	Cats on the Ceiling	Ruel	Australia/United Kingdom
167	A Bullet w/ My Name On	Bring Me the Horizon featuring Underoath	United Kingdom/United States
168	Speyside	Bon Iver	United States
169	Time Will Try	The Rions	Australia
170	Doing in Me Head	Amyl and the Sniffers	Australia
171	Troopy	The Terrys	Australia
172	Boyfriend	Teenage Dads	Australia
173	Genesis, Pt II	Raye	United Kingdom
174	Whatchu Kno About Me	GloRilla and Sexyy Red	United States
175	Weaponz	Teenage Dads	Australia
176	Is It Ever Gonna Make Sense	Budjerah	Australia
177	Espresso	Sabrina Carpenter	United States
178	Stay the Same	Beddy Rays	Australia
179	Roxanne (Like a Version)	South Summit	Australia
180	Tough	Quavo and Lana Del Rey	United States
181	Out of My Head	Skegss	Australia
182	Skinny	Billie Eilish	United States
183	You Need Me Now?	Girl in Red featuring Sabrina Carpenter	Norway/United States
184	Criminal	Stand Atlantic featuring Polaris	Australia
185	Highjack	ASAP Rocky and Jessica Pratt	United States
186	Ego	Halsey	United States
187	Dull	Teen Jesus and the Jean Teasers featuring Softcult	Australia/Canada
188	Takes One to Know One	The Beaches	Canada
189	Southerly	King Stingray	Australia
190	Big Dreams	Amyl and the Sniffers	Australia
191	Bad Dream	Wallows	United States
192	Soup	Remi Wolf	United States
193	Espresso (Like a Version)	Good Neighbours	Australia
194	Touchy Subject	Peach PRC	Australia
195	Hurt My Feelings	Tate McRae	Canada
196	Linger (SiriusXM session)	Royel Otis	Australia
197	Fade into You (Like a Version)	The Rubens	Australia
198	Hold On	Beddy Rays	Australia
199	Goddess	Laufey	Iceland
200	Golden Wolf	Dope Lemon	Australia

== Statistics ==
=== Artists with multiple entries ===
#	Artist	Entries
8	Billie Eilish (Note: Seven times solo (3, 17, 27, 33, 55, 59, 92), once with Charli XCX (6))	3, 6, 17, 27, 33, 55, 59, 92
8	Charli XCX	6, 20, 26, 28, 31, 35, 36, 93
5	Gracie Abrams	5, 22, 45, 49, 71
4	Royel Otis	2, 39, 44, 86
4	Kendrick Lamar	8, 56, 90, 97
3	Tyler, the Creator	30, 81, 84
3	Tate McRae	41, 47, 77
3	Rüfüs Du Sol	58, 80, 87
2	Dom Dolla	7, 14
2	Fred Again	10, 12
2	The Kid Laroi	23, 50
2	SZA (Note: Once solo (29), once with Kendrick Lamar (56))	29, 56
2	Amyl and the Sniffers	32, 34
2	Doechii	42, 96
2	The Rions	46, 61
2	Fontaines D.C.	48, 68
2	Clairo	51, 54
2	Bring Me the Horizon	53, 98
2	Sam Fender (Note: Once with Noah Kahan (57), once solo (83))	57, 83
2	Lime Cordiale	60, 89
2	Glass Animals	72, 73
2	Playboi Carti (Note: Once with The Weeknd (85), and once with Future and Metro Boomin (100))	85, 100
2	Fisher	88, 94

=== Countries represented ===
Nation	Total
United States	43
United Kingdom	31
Australia	29
Canada	6
Ireland	2
Germany	2
Sweden	1
New Zealand	1
Albania	1
Japan	1

=== Records ===
- The 2024 countdown featured 29 tracks by Australian artists, a sharp decline from recent years and the fewest for an annual countdown since 1996. It also marked the first time since 1998 that more artists from the United States appeared in the countdown than from Australia.
- The United Kingdom contributed a record 31 entries to the 2024 Hottest 100. It was the third time that the United Kingdom had the second-most entries in the countdown (after 2009 and 2015), and the first time that there were more British than Australian entries.
- Chappell Roan became the third artist overall to both make their debut appearance at number 1 and also have no other songs in the countdown, following Denis Leary in 1993 and the Wiggles in 2021.
- "Good Luck, Babe!" received a greater number of votes than any prior Hottest 100 winner.
  - Furthermore, each song in the top four received enough votes to have won the 2023 countdown.
- Charli XCX and Billie Eilish set a new record for the most appearances in a single countdown, with eight entries each, including one song, "Guess", on which they both appear. This beat the previous record of seven, set in 2023 by G Flip.
- Billie Eilish equalled the record held by Hilltop Hoods for total entries across all annual countdowns, with 25.
- Billie Eilish made her eighth consecutive appearance in the Hottest 100, having featured in every annual countdown since 2017.
  - Similarly, Fisher, Lime Cordiale and Bring Me the Horizon made their seventh consecutive appearance, with all artists having featured since 2018.
  - Spacey Jane made their sixth consecutive appearance, having featured since 2019.
- Fontaines D.C. became the first Irish act to appear in the Hottest 100 in twenty years, the previous being U2 in 2004.
- Missy Higgins made her first appearance in a Hottest 100 since 2007, ending a seventeen-year absence.
  - Higgins's cover of "One of Your Girls" resulted in the song charting in the countdown for the second year in a row, after the original by Troye Sivan featured at #31 in 2023.
- Taylor Swift made her first Hottest 100 appearance, featuring on "Us" by Gracie Abrams. A decade earlier, Triple J had disqualified Swift's song "Shake It Off" after a corporate-backed social media campaign promoting its inclusion in the 2014 countdown.
