= Brit Award for Song of the Year =

British music award category created 1977

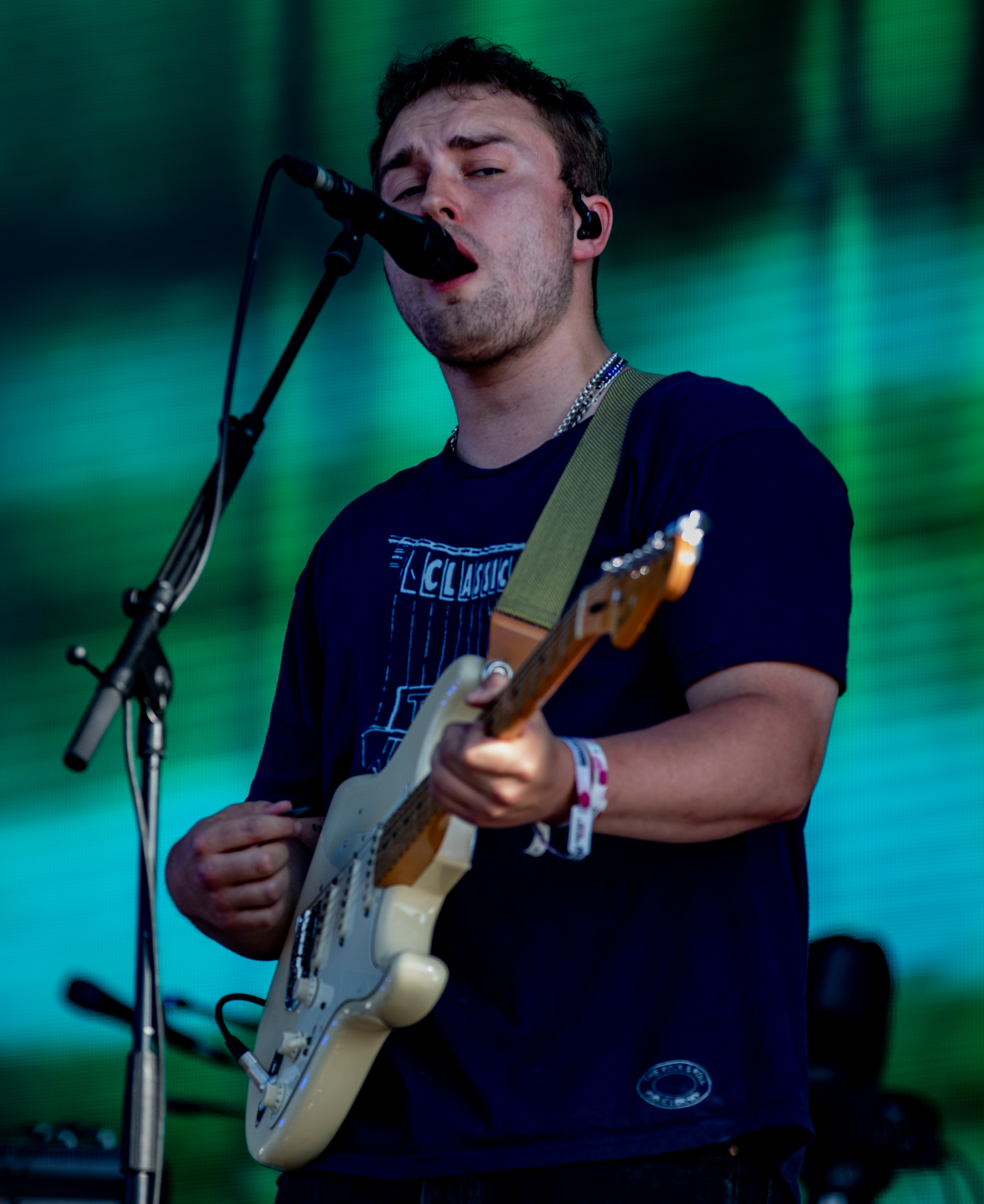
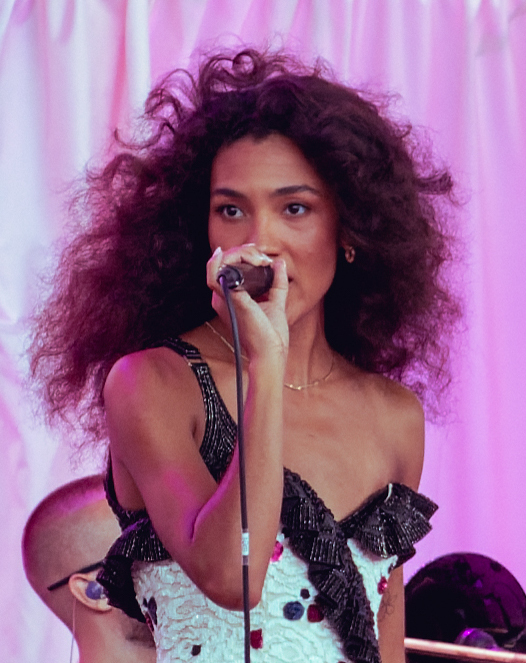
- 2026 winners Sam Fender (left) and Olivia Dean (right)
- Awarded for: Achievement in excellent song
- Country: United Kingdom
- Presented by: British Phonographic Industry (BPI)
- First award: 1977
- Currently held by: Sam Fender and Olivia Dean – "Rein Me In" (2026)

Highlights
- Most awards: Take That (5)
- Most nominations: Calvin Harris (8)
- Website: brits.co.uk

The Brit Award for Song of the Year is an award given by the British Phonographic Industry (BPI), an organisation which represents record companies and artists in the United Kingdom. The accolade is presented at the Brit Awards, an annual celebration of British and international music. The winners and nominees are determined by the Brit Awards voting academy with over one-thousand members, which comprise record labels, publishers, managers, agents, media, and previous winners and nominees. The award was first known as Brit Award for British Single, from the inaugural 1977 Brit Awards through to the 2019 Brit Awards, was first renamed as Song of the Year in 2020, returned to the name British Single in 2021, then returned to Song of the Year in 2022.

In 1984 and 1991, the category was non-competitive, with the award given directly to the highest-selling single of the year.

The inaugural recipients in this category were Queen and Procol Harum, who both won in 1977. The current holders of the award are Sam Fender and Olivia Dean, who won in 2026 for "Rein Me In".

== Achievements ==
Robbie Williams is the biggest winner in this category with six, including three as a member of Take That, who have five wins, the most of any group. They are followed by three-time winner Adele, and Harry Styles, who won twice as a solo artist and once as a member of One Direction. Queen are the only other act to win more than once, with two. Williams leads all performers with twelve nominations, followed by Calvin Harris, who has nine. Take That has the most nominations as a group, with seven. Dua Lipa has the most nominations among female artists, with seven. Ed Sheeran holds the record for most nominations without a win, with eight.

Nine artists have been nominated for multiple songs in the same year; Adam and the Ants for "Prince Charming" and "Stand and Deliver" in 1982; Jason Donovan for "Sealed with a Kiss" and "Too Many Broken Hearts" and Jive Bunny and the Mastermixers for "Let's Party", "Swing the Mood" and "That's What I Like", both in 1990; Take That for winning song "Could It Be Magic", "It Only Takes a Minute" and "A Million Love Songs" in 1993; Blur for winning song "Parklife" and "Girls & Boys" in 1995; Robbie Williams for winning song "Angels" and "Millennium" in 1999; Gareth Gates for "Anyone of Us (Stupid Mistake)" and "Unchained Melody" in 2003; Rita Ora for "Hot Right Now" as a featured artist and "R.I.P." as a lead artist in 2013, becoming the first female artist nominated for two songs in the same year; and David Guetta for "Bed" and "Remember", both as a co-lead artist, in 2022. "Do They Know It's Christmas?" is the only song nominated in two different versions; Band Aid II's recording in 1990 and Band Aid 20's version in 2005.

Take That were the first act to win British Single in two consecutive years: in 1993 ("Could It Be Magic") and 1994 ("Pray"), and they repeated this feat, winning in 2007 with "Patience" and 2008 with "Shine". That record was overtaken by Robbie Williams, a former member of the band, when he had three wins in a row with "Angels" (1999), "She's the One" (2000), and "Rock DJ" (2001).

The first female act to win the award was Spice Girls in 1997, for "Wannabe". Dido became the first female solo performer to win in 2004, for "White Flag". Adele is the first female artist to win the award twice, winning for "Skyfall" in 2013 and "Hello" in 2016 and then became the first woman to win three times with 2022's "Easy on Me".

The first and only tie in this category in Brits history happened at the inaugural ceremony in 1977, when both "Bohemian Rhapsody" by Queen and "A Whiter Shade of Pale" by Procol Harum won the award.

Unlike other categories, international artists are eligible for British Single/Song of the Year if the primary artist is British. The first foreign artist to win this award was American singer Bruno Mars in 2015 as a featured artist on Mark Ronson's "Uptown Funk". Since then, two more American artists have won the award: 070 Shake (as the featured artist in "Escapism" by Raye) in 2024 and Billie Eilish (as the featured artist in "Guess" by Charli XCX) in 2025.

Six foreign artists have been nominated as the sole lead artist; American artists Survivor for "Eye of the Tiger" and Irene Cara for "Fame" in 1983, Australian singer Jason Donovan for "Sealed with a Kiss" and "Too Many Broken Hearts" in 1990 and "Any Dream Will Do" in 1992, Jamaican-American singer Shaggy for "Oh Carolina" in 1994, Italian producer Spiller for "Groovejet (If This Ain't Love)" featuring English singer Sophie Ellis-Bextor in 2001, and Norwegian producer Alan Walker for "Faded" in 2017. Ten others have been nominated as co-leads with British artists; Irish band U2 for "Take Me to the Clouds Above" with LMC in 2005, Kosovan producer Regard for "Secrets" with Raye in 2021, French producer David Guetta for "Bed" with Joel Corry and Raye and "Remember" with Becky Hill in 2022, American singer Ashanti for "Baby" with Aitch and German singer Kim Petras for "Unholy" with Sam Smith in 2023, Irish producer CamrinWatsin for "Kisses" with Bl3ss and Bbyclose and Australian producer Sonny Fodera and Irish singer Jazzy for "Somedays" with D.O.D. in 2025, and American artists Ariana Grande for "Defying Gravity" with Cynthia Erivo and PlaqueBoyMax for "Victory Lap" with Fred Again and Skepta in 2026.

== Recipients ==
Non-British artists are indicated by the flag of their country.

=== 1970s ===
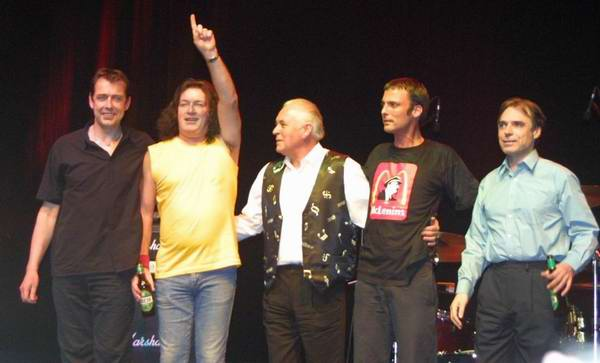
Joint-inaugural winners Procol Harum

Year	Single	Artist(s)
1977 (1st)
1977 (1st)	"A Whiter Shade of Pale"	Procol Harum
1977 (1st)	"Bohemian Rhapsody"	Queen
1977 (1st)	"I'm Not in Love"	10cc
1977 (1st)	"She Loves You"	The Beatles

=== 1980s ===
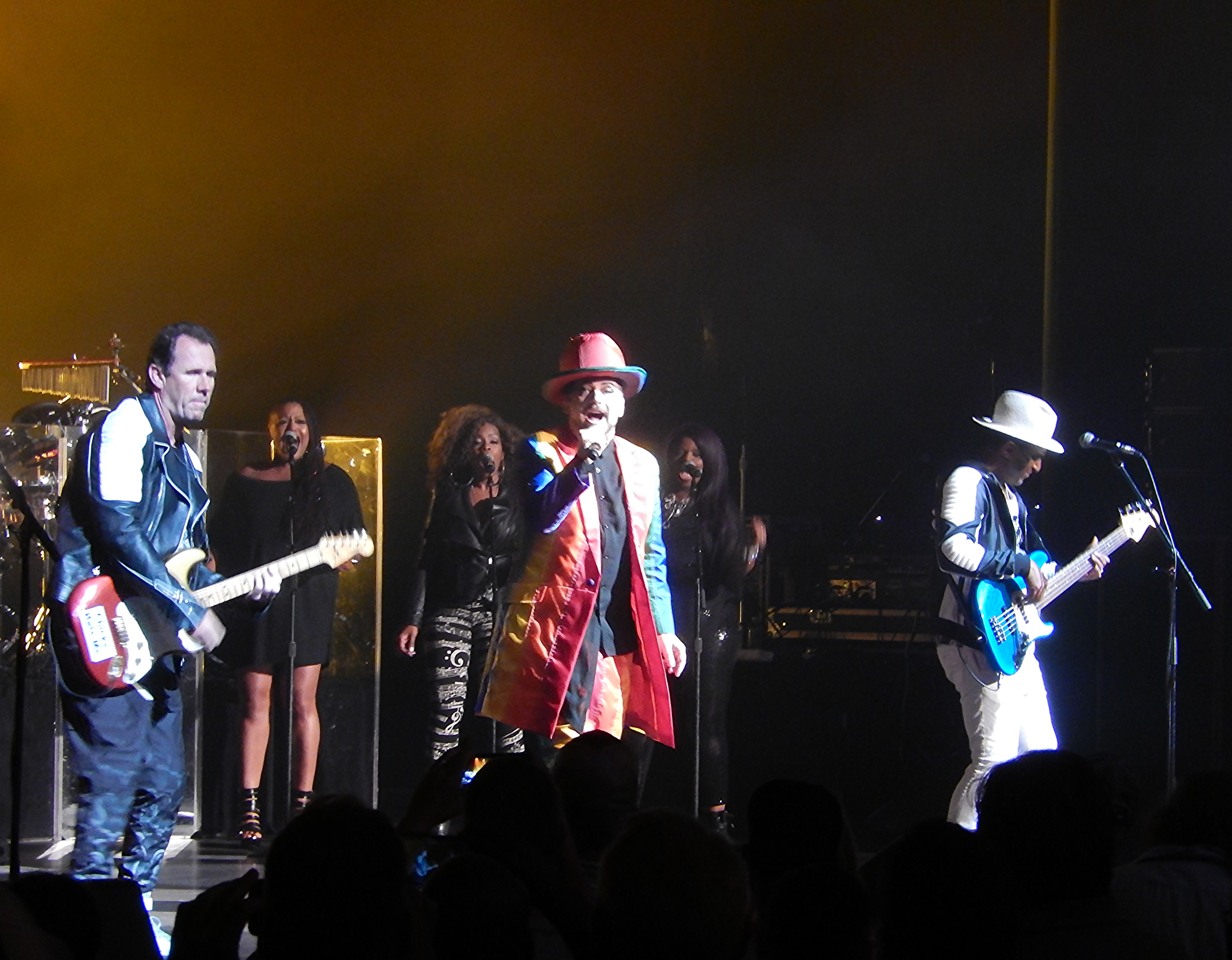
1984 winners Culture Club received the award for their iconic single "Karma Chameleon"

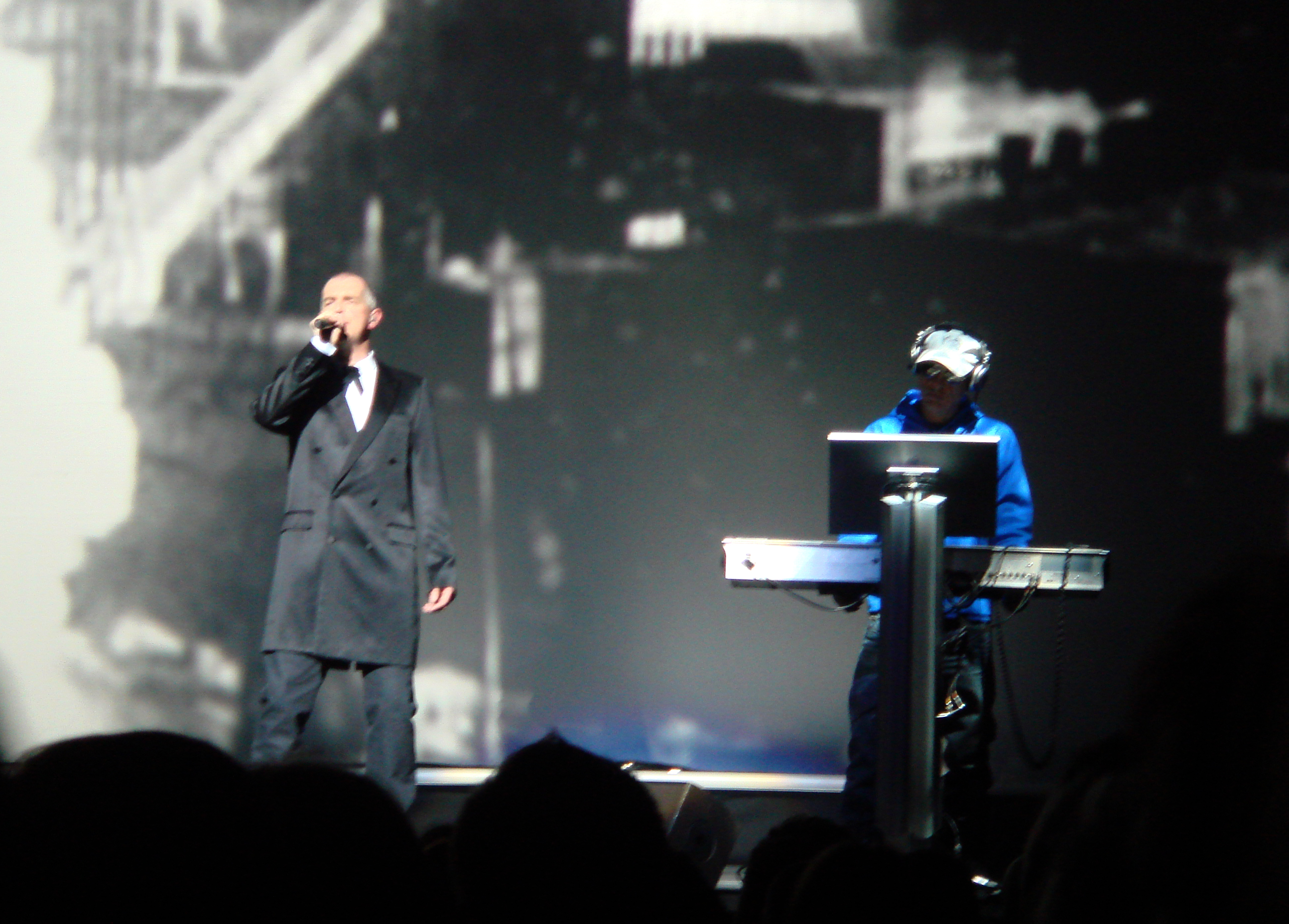
1987 recipients Pet Shop Boys

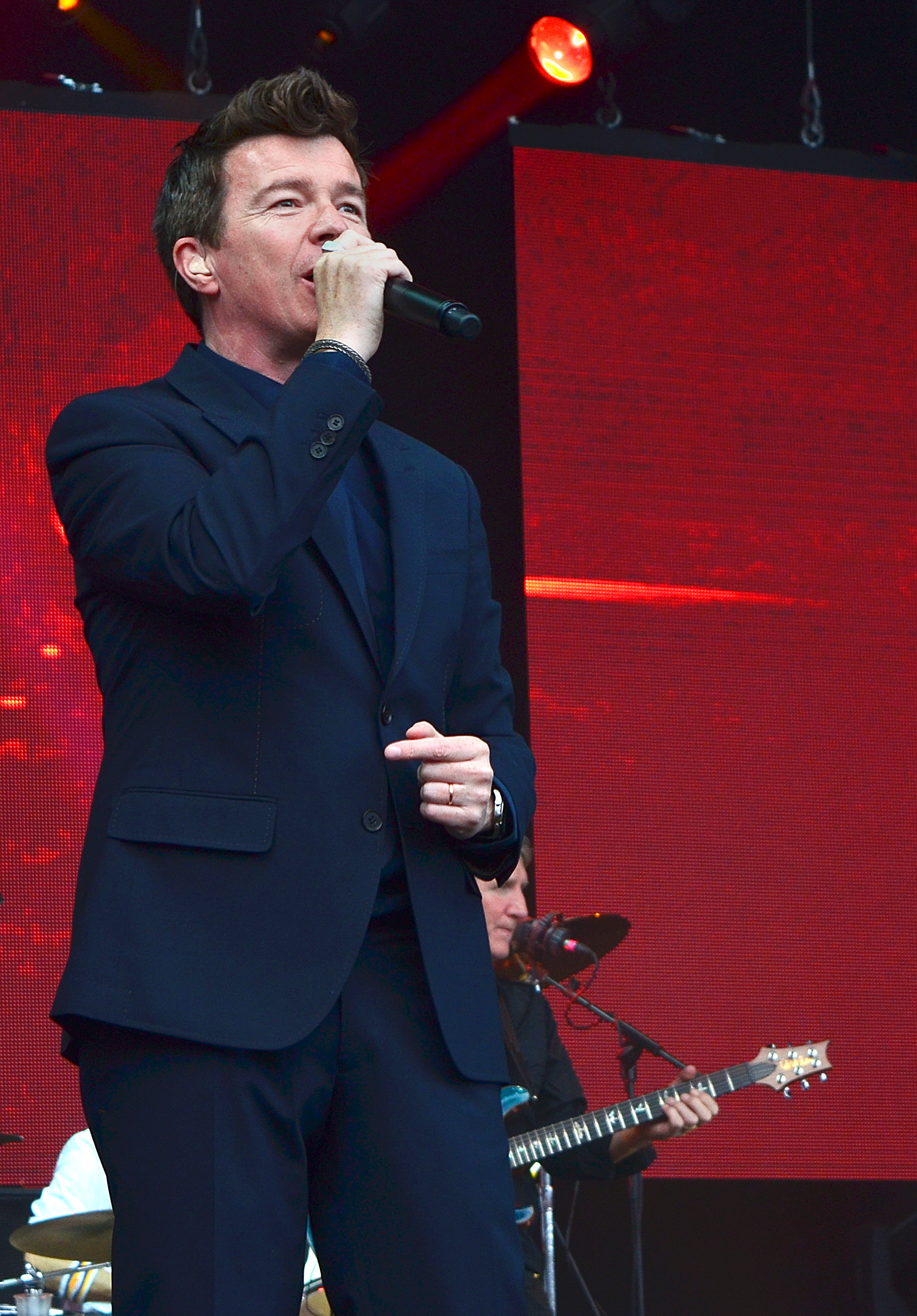
Rick Astley won in 1988 for "Never Gonna Give You Up"

Year	Single	Artist(s)
1982 (2nd)
1982 (2nd)	"Tainted Love"	Soft Cell
1982 (2nd)	"Prince Charming"	Adam and the Ants
1982 (2nd)	"Stand and Deliver"	Adam and the Ants
1983 (3rd)
1983 (3rd)	"Come On Eileen"	Dexys Midnight Runners
1983 (3rd)	"Eye of the Tiger"	Survivor
1983 (3rd)	"Fame"	Irene Cara
1984 (4th)
1984 (4th)	"Karma Chameleon"	Culture Club
1985 (5th)
1985 (5th)	"Relax"	Frankie Goes to Hollywood
1985 (5th)	"Careless Whisper"	Wham!
1985 (5th)	"Smalltown Boy"	Bronski Beat
1985 (5th)	"Smooth Operator"	Sade
1985 (5th)	"Two Tribes"	Frankie Goes to Hollywood
1986 (6th)
1986 (6th)	"Everybody Wants to Rule the World"	Tears for Fears
1986 (6th)	"19"	Paul Hardcastle
1986 (6th)	"Dancing in the Street"	David Bowie & Mick Jagger
1986 (6th)	"Money for Nothing"	Dire Straits
1986 (6th)	"Running Up That Hill"	Kate Bush
1987 (7th)
1987 (7th)	"West End Girls"	Pet Shop Boys
1987 (7th)	"Don't Leave Me This Way"	The Communards & Sarah Jane Morris
1987 (7th)	"Holding Back the Years"	Simply Red
1987 (7th)	"The Lady in Red"	Chris de Burgh
1987 (7th)	"Sledgehammer"	Peter Gabriel
1988 (8th)
1988 (8th)	"Never Gonna Give You Up"	Rick Astley
1988 (8th)	"China in Your Hand"	T'Pau
1988 (8th)	"It's a Sin"	Pet Shop Boys
1988 (8th)	"Love in the First Degree"	Bananarama
1988 (8th)	"Pump Up the Volume"	MARRS
1989 (9th)
1989 (9th)	"Perfect"	Fairground Attraction
1989 (9th)	"Kiss"	Art of Noise featuring Tom Jones
1989 (9th)	"Real Gone Kid"	Deacon Blue
1989 (9th)	"She Makes My Day"	Robert Palmer
1989 (9th)	"Twist in My Sobriety"	Tanita Tikaram

=== 1990s ===
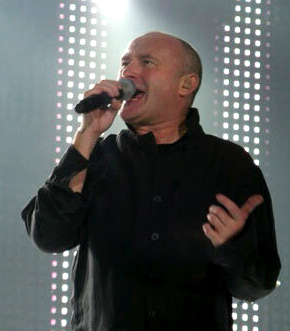
Phil Collins won the award in 1990

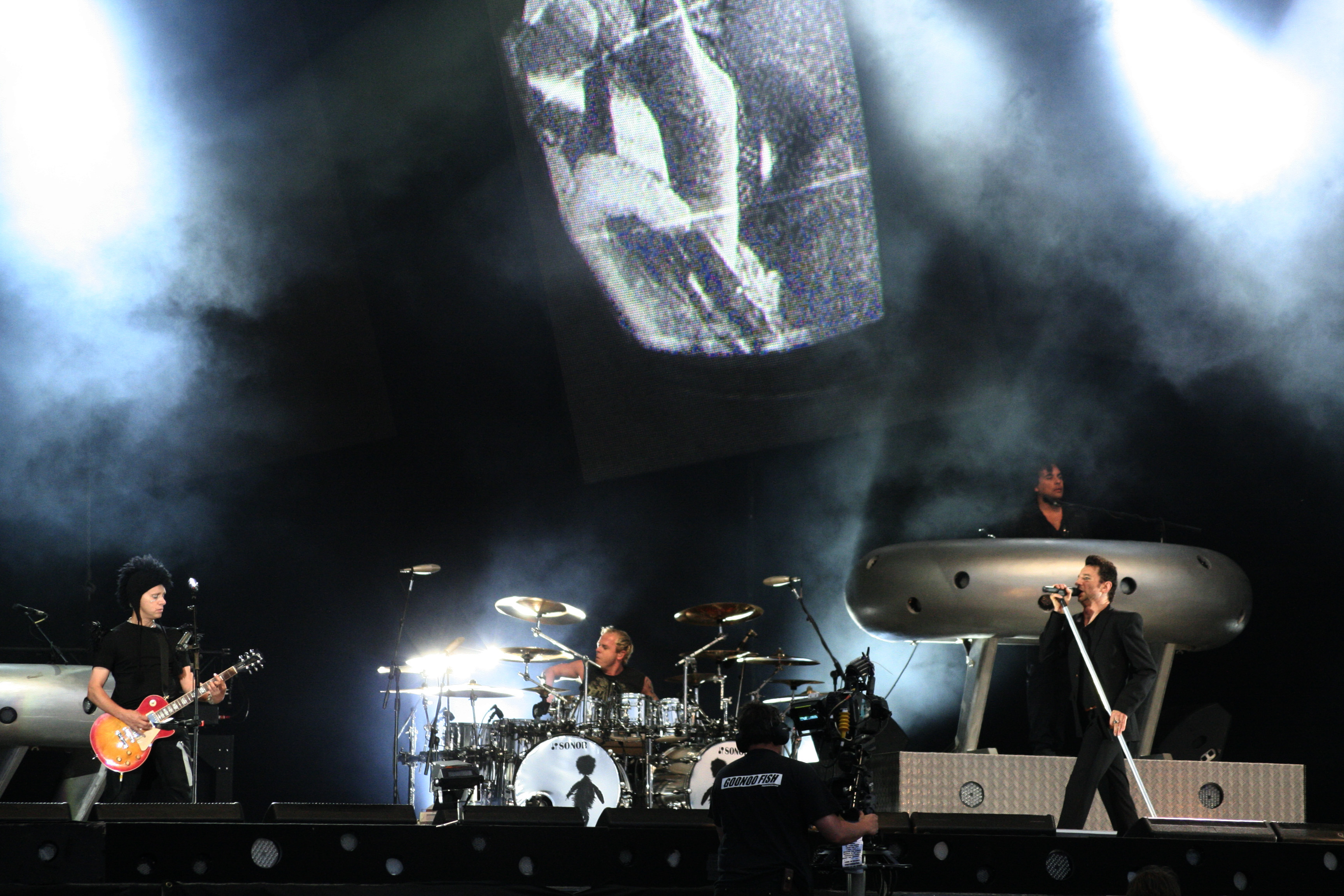
1991 recipients Depeche Mode

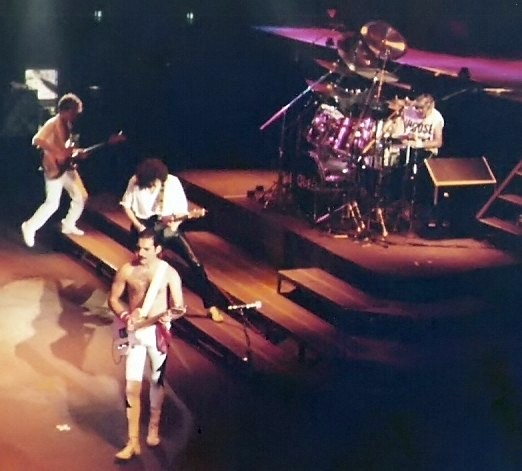
Two-time winners Queen

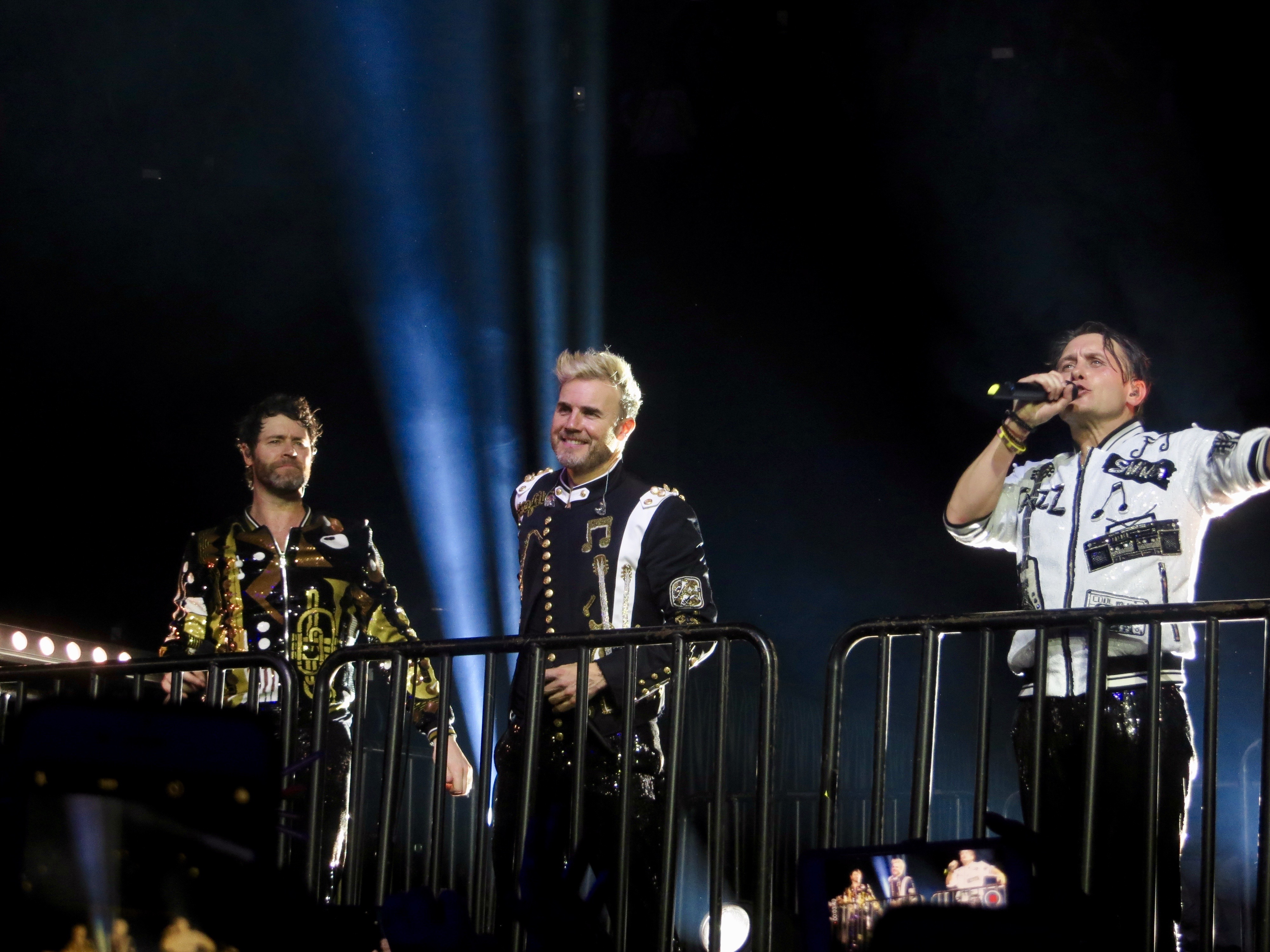
Five-time winners Take That

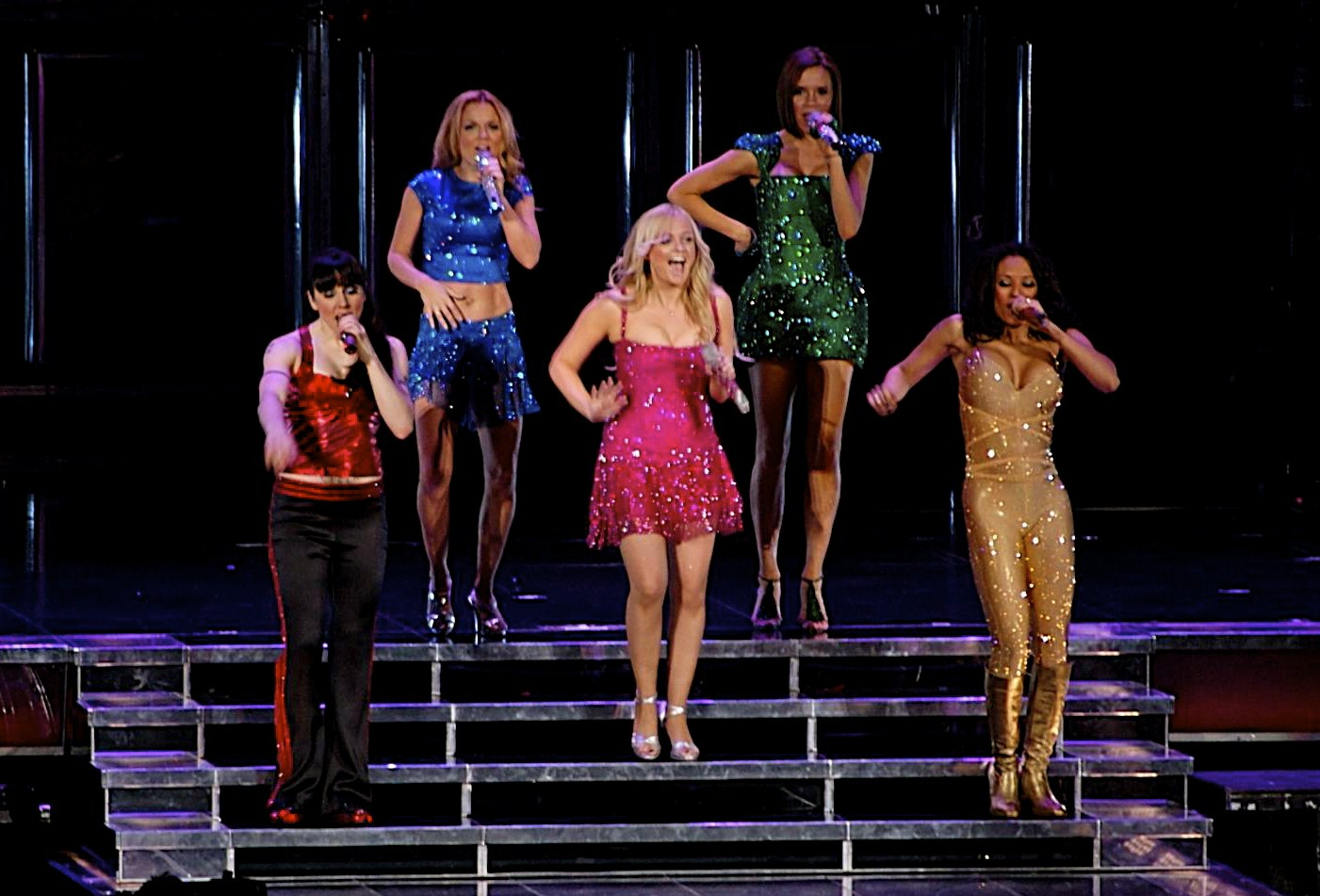
Spice Girls won for their worldwide smash "Wannabe"

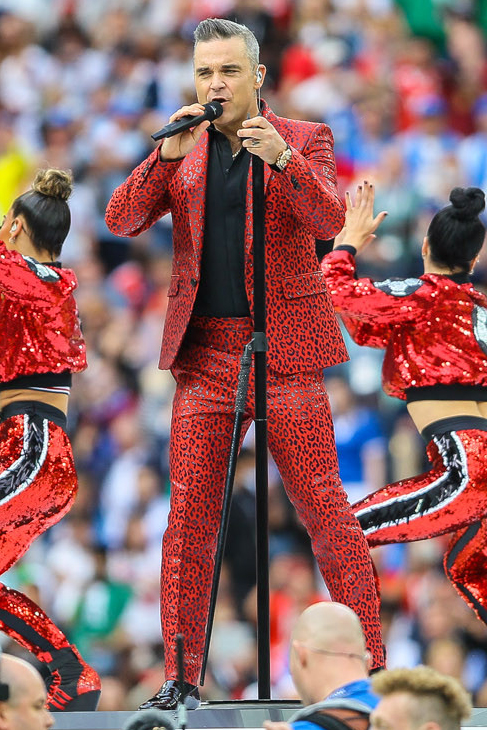
Robbie Williams holds the record for most wins in this category, with six. Williams won three of his awards as a member of Take That, and three as a solo artist.

Year	Single	Artist(s)
1990 (10th)
1990 (10th)	"Another Day in Paradise"	Phil Collins
1990 (10th)	"All Around the World"	Lisa Stansfield
1990 (10th)	"Back to Life (However Do You Want Me)"	Soul II Soul featuring Caron Wheeler
1990 (10th)	"Belfast Child"	Simple Minds
1990 (10th)	"Do They Know It's Christmas?"	Band Aid II
1990 (10th)	"Ferry Cross the Mersey"	The Christians, Holly Johnson, Paul McCartney, Gerry Marsden & Stock Aitken Waterman
1990 (10th)	"Let's Party"	Jive Bunny and the Mastermixers
1990 (10th)	"Sealed with a Kiss"	Jason Donovan
1990 (10th)	"Something's Gotten Hold of My Heart"	Marc Almond featuring Gene Pitney
1990 (10th)	"Swing the Mood"	Jive Bunny and the Mastermixers
1990 (10th)	"That's What I Like"	Jive Bunny and the Mastermixers
1990 (10th)	"Too Many Broken Hearts"	Jason Donovan
1990 (10th)	"You'll Never Stop Me Loving You"	Sonia
1991 (11th)
1991 (11th)	"Enjoy the Silence"	Depeche Mode
1992 (12th)
1992 (12th)	"These Are the Days of Our Lives"	Queen
1992 (12th)	"3 a.m. Eternal"	The KLF
1992 (12th)	"Any Dream Will Do"	Jason Donovan
1992 (12th)	"Bring Your Daughter... to the Slaughter"	Iron Maiden
1992 (12th)	"Dizzy"	Vic Reeves & The Wonder Stuff
1992 (12th)	"The Stonk"	Gareth Hale & Norman Pace
1993 (13th)
1993 (13th)	"Could It Be Magic"	Take That
1993 (13th)	"Goodnight Girl"	Wet Wet Wet
1993 (13th)	"It Only Takes a Minute"	Take That
1993 (13th)	"A Million Love Songs"	Take That
1993 (13th)	"Stay"	Shakespears Sister
1994 (14th)
1994 (14th)	"Pray"	Take That
1994 (14th)	"Animal Nitrate"	Suede
1994 (14th)	"Creep"	Radiohead
1994 (14th)	"Don't Be a Stranger"	Dina Carroll
1994 (14th)	"Wild Wood"	Paul Weller
1994 (14th)	Eliminated	
1994 (14th)	"Boom Shack-A-Lak"	Apache Indian
1994 (14th)	"Dreams"	Gabrielle
1994 (14th)	"Moving On Up"	M People
1994 (14th)	"Oh Carolina"	Shaggy
1994 (14th)	"Regret"	New Order
1995 (15th)
1995 (15th)	"Parklife"	Blur featuring Phil Daniels
1995 (15th)	"Girls & Boys"	Blur
1995 (15th)	"Live Forever"	Oasis
1995 (15th)	"Love Is All Around"	Wet Wet Wet
1995 (15th)	"Stay Another Day"	East 17
1995 (15th)	Eliminated	
1995 (15th)	"If I Only Knew"	Tom Jones
1995 (15th)	"Searching"	China Black
1995 (15th)	"Sweetness"	Michelle Gayle
1995 (15th)	"Texas Cowboys"	The Grid
1995 (15th)	"Things Can Only Get Better"	D:Ream
1996 (16th)
1996 (16th)	"Back for Good"	Take That
1996 (16th)	"Common People"	Pulp
1996 (16th)	"Country House"	Blur
1996 (16th)	"Missing"	Everything but the Girl
1996 (16th)	"Wonderwall"	Oasis
1996 (16th)	Eliminated	
1996 (16th)	"Alright"	Supergrass
1996 (16th)	"Fairground"	Simply Red
1996 (16th)	"A Girl Like You"	Edwyn Collins
1996 (16th)	"No More "I Love You's""	Annie Lennox
1996 (16th)	"Roll with It"	Oasis
1997 (17th)
1997 (17th)	"Wannabe"	Spice Girls
1997 (17th)	"Born Slippy"	Underworld
1997 (17th)	"A Design for Life"	Manic Street Preachers
1997 (17th)	"Don't Look Back in Anger"	Oasis
1997 (17th)	"Fastlove"	George Michael
1997 (17th)	"Firestarter"	The Prodigy
1997 (17th)	"Lifted"	Lighthouse Family
1997 (17th)	"Return of the Mack"	Mark Morrison
1997 (17th)	"Tattva"	Kula Shaker
1997 (17th)	"You're Gorgeous"	Babybird
1998 (18th)
1998 (18th)	"Never Ever"	All Saints
1998 (18th)	"Bitter Sweet Symphony"	The Verve
1998 (18th)	"I Wanna Be the Only One"	Eternal featuring BeBe Winans
1998 (18th)	"Old Before I Die"	Robbie Williams
1998 (18th)	"Paranoid Android"	Radiohead
1998 (18th)	"Say What You Want"	Texas
1998 (18th)	"Something About the Way You Look Tonight" / "Candle in the Wind 1997"	Elton John
1998 (18th)	"Song 2"	Blur
1998 (18th)	"Tubthumping"	Chumbawamba
1998 (18th)	"You're Not Alone"	Olive
1999 (19th)
1999 (19th)	"Angels"	Robbie Williams
1999 (19th)	"Brimful of Asha"	Cornershop
1999 (19th)	"If You Tolerate This Your Children Will Be Next"	Manic Street Preachers
1999 (19th)	"Life"	Des'ree
1999 (19th)	"Millennium"	Robbie Williams
1999 (19th)	"Outside"	George Michael
1999 (19th)	"Perfect 10"	The Beautiful South
1999 (19th)	"Road Rage"	Catatonia
1999 (19th)	"The Rockafeller Skank"	Fatboy Slim
1999 (19th)	"Teardrop"	Massive Attack

=== 2000s ===
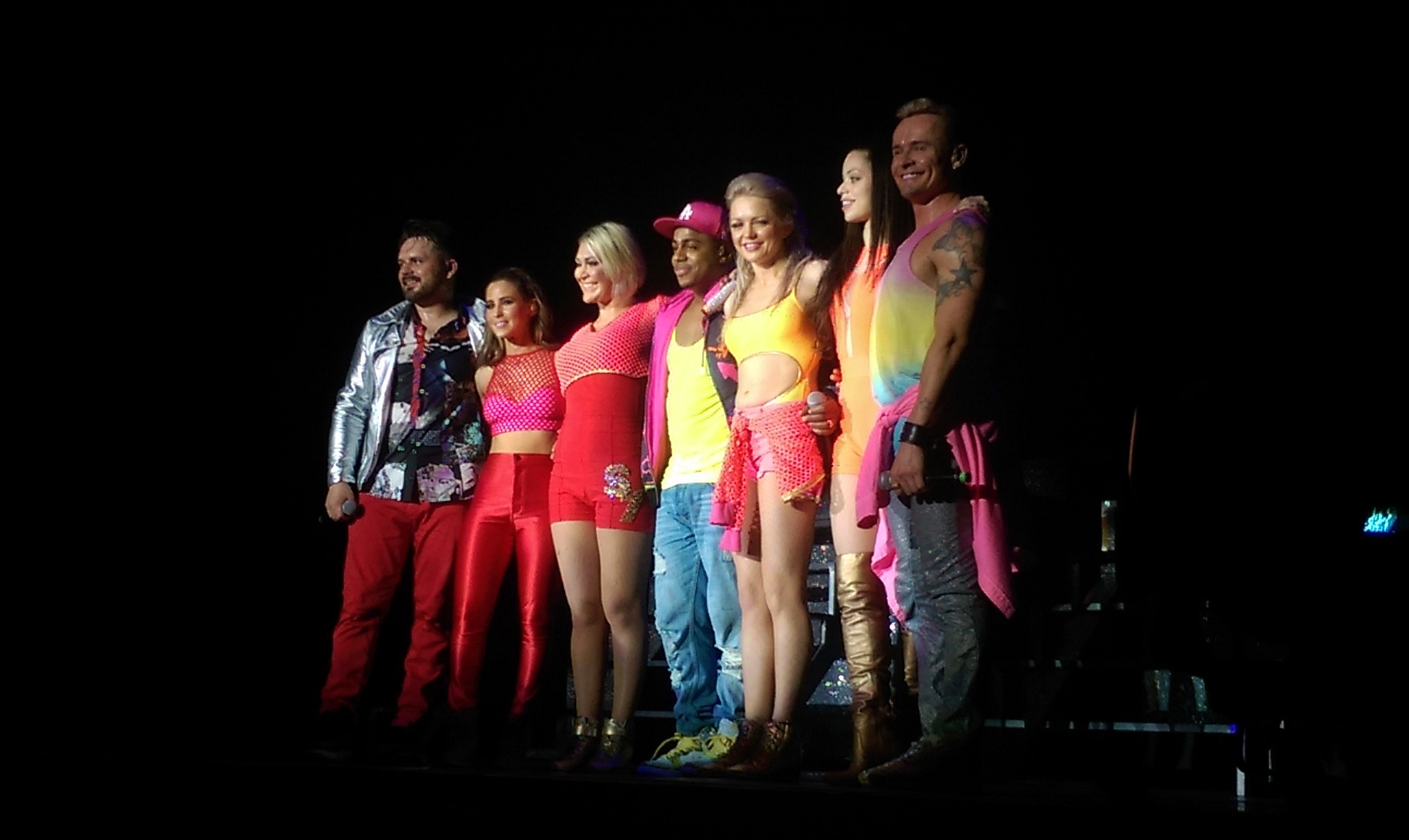
2002 winners S Club 7

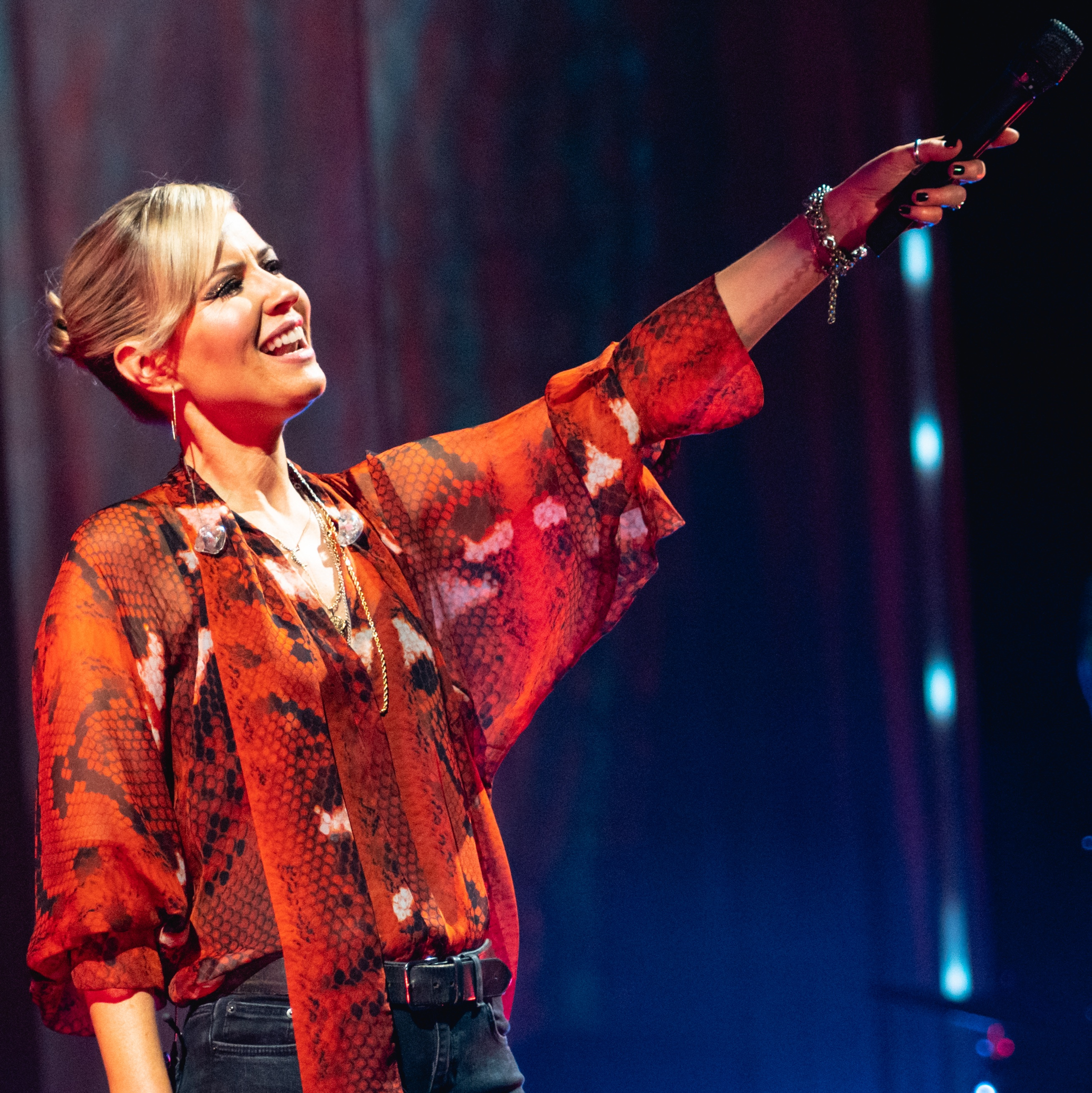
Dido became the first solo female winner in 2004 for "White Flag"

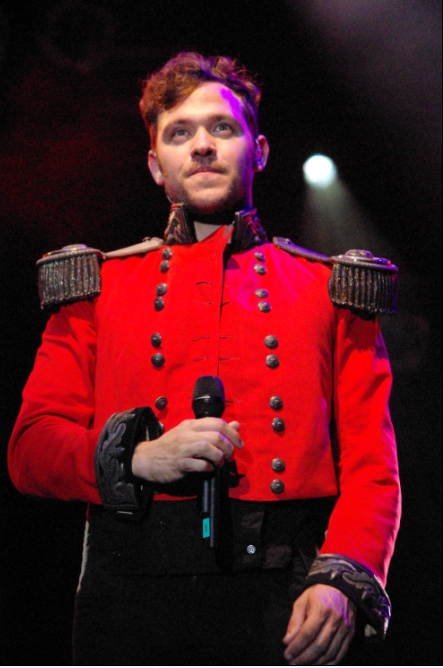
Will Young received the award in 2005

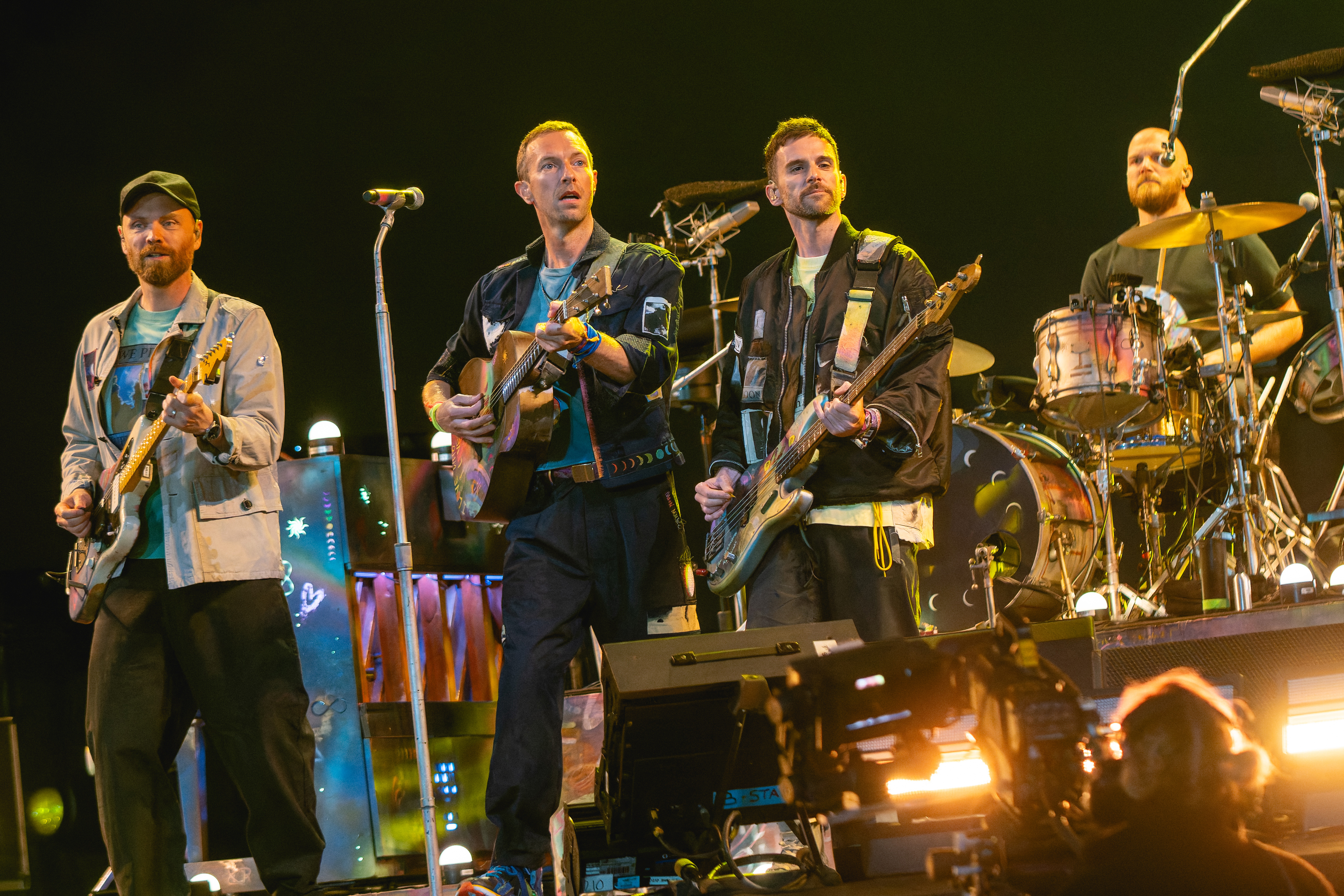
2006 winners Coldplay

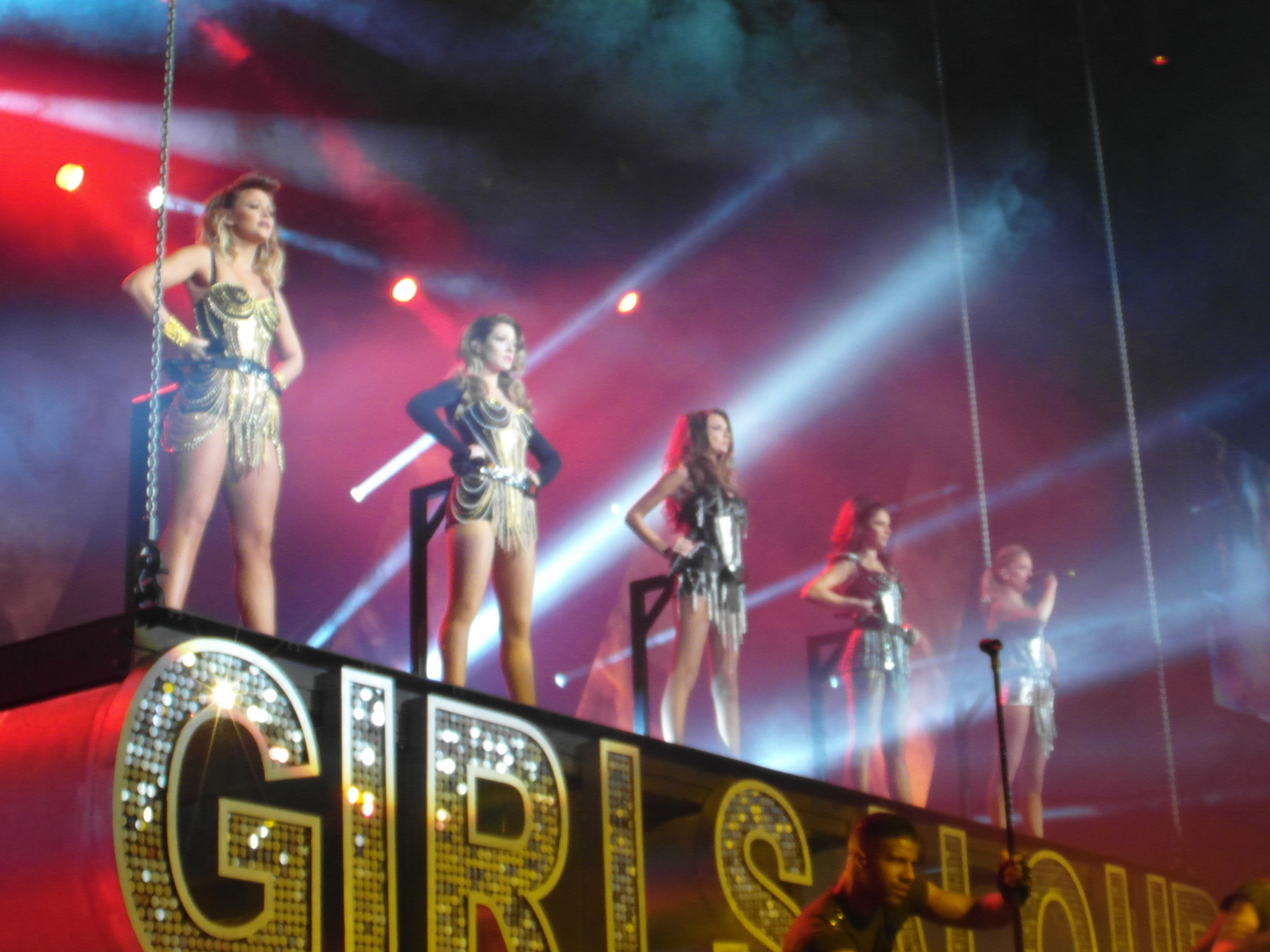
Girls Aloud won for their comeback single "The Promise"

Year	Single	Artist(s)
2000 (20th)
2000 (20th)	"She's the One"	Robbie Williams
2000 (20th)	"Hey Boy Hey Girl"	The Chemical Brothers
2000 (20th)	"Moving"	Supergrass
2000 (20th)	"Praise You"	Fatboy Slim
2000 (20th)	"Red Alert"	Basement Jaxx featuring Blu James
2000 (20th)	"Sing It Back"	Moloko
2000 (20th)	"Sweet like Chocolate"	Shanks & Bigfoot
2000 (20th)	"Tender"	Blur
2000 (20th)	"Why Does It Always Rain on Me?"	Travis
2000 (20th)	"You Stole the Sun from My Heart"	Manic Street Preachers
2001 (21st)
2001 (21st)	"Rock DJ"	Robbie Williams
2001 (21st)	"7 Days"	Craig David
2001 (21st)	"Babylon"	David Gray
2001 (21st)	"Dancing in the Moonlight"	Toploader
2001 (21st)	"Groovejet (If This Ain't Love)"	Spiller featuring Sophie Ellis-Bextor
2001 (21st)	"It Feels So Good"	Sonique
2001 (21st)	"Overload"	Sugababes
2001 (21st)	"Pure Shores"	All Saints
2001 (21st)	"The Time Is Now"	Moloko
2001 (21st)	"Yellow"	Coldplay
2002 (22nd)
2002 (22nd)	"Don't Stop Movin'"	S Club 7
2002 (22nd)	"21 Seconds"	So Solid Crew
2002 (22nd)	"Clint Eastwood"	Gorillaz featuring Del the Funky Homosapien
2002 (22nd)	"Do You Really Like It?"	DJ Pied Piper and the Masters of Ceremonies
2002 (22nd)	"Eternity/The Road to Mandalay"	Robbie Williams
2002 (22nd)	"Gotta Get Thru This"	Daniel Bedingfield
2002 (22nd)	"It's Raining Men"	Geri Halliwell
2002 (22nd)	"Mambo No. 5"	Bob the Builder
2002 (22nd)	"Pure and Simple"	Hear'Say
2002 (22nd)	"Whole Again"	Atomic Kitten
2003 (23rd)
2003 (23rd)	"Just a Little"	Liberty X
2003 (23rd)	"Anyone of Us (Stupid Mistake)"	Gareth Gates
2003 (23rd)	"Anything Is Possible"	Will Young
2003 (23rd)	"The Tide Is High"	Atomic Kitten
2003 (23rd)	"Unchained Melody"	Gareth Gates
2004 (24th)
2004 (24th)	"White Flag"	Dido
2004 (24th)	"Scandalous"	Mis-Teeq
2004 (24th)	"Spirit in the Sky"	Gareth Gates
2004 (24th)	"Superstar"	Jamelia
2004 (24th)	"Sweet Dreams My LA Ex"	Rachel Stevens
2005 (25th)
2005 (25th)	"Your Game"	Will Young
2005 (25th)	"Amazing"	George Michael
2005 (25th)	"Do They Know It's Christmas?"	Band Aid 20
2005 (25th)	"Dry Your Eyes"	The Streets
2005 (25th)	"Everybody's Changing"	Keane
2005 (25th)	"In the Middle"	Sugababes
2005 (25th)	"Lola's Theme"	The Shapeshifters
2005 (25th)	"Take Me to the Clouds Above"	LMC vs U2
2005 (25th)	"Thank You"	Jamelia
2005 (25th)	"These Words"	Natasha Bedingfield
2006 (26th)
2006 (26th)	"Speed of Sound"	Coldplay
2006 (26th)	"Is This the Way to Amarillo"	Tony Christie featuring Peter Kay
2006 (26th)	"Push the Button"	Sugababes
2006 (26th)	"That's My Goal"	Shayne Ward
2006 (26th)	"You're Beautiful"	James Blunt
2007 (27th)
2007 (27th)	"Patience"	Take That
2007 (27th)	"All Time Love"	Will Young
2007 (27th)	"America"	Razorlight
2007 (27th)	"Chasing Cars"	Snow Patrol
2007 (27th)	"Fill My Little World"	The Feeling
2007 (27th)	Eliminated	
2007 (27th)	"I Wish I Was a Punk Rocker (With Flowers in My Hair)"	Sandi Thom
2007 (27th)	"A Moment Like This"	Leona Lewis
2007 (27th)	"Put Your Records On"	Corinne Bailey Rae
2007 (27th)	"She Moves in Her Own Way"	The Kooks
2007 (27th)	"Smile"	Lily Allen
2008 (28th)
2008 (28th)	"Shine"	Take That
2008 (28th)	"Bleeding Love"	Leona Lewis
2008 (28th)	"Grace Kelly"	Mika
2008 (28th)	"Valerie"	Mark Ronson featuring Amy Winehouse
2008 (28th)	"Worried About Ray"	The Hoosiers
2008 (28th)	Eliminated	
2008 (28th)	"1973"	James Blunt
2008 (28th)	"About You Now"	Sugababes
2008 (28th)	"Foundations"	Kate Nash
2008 (28th)	"Real Girl"	Mutya Buena
2008 (28th)	"Ruby"	Kaiser Chiefs
2009 (29th)
2009 (29th)	"The Promise"	Girls Aloud
2009 (29th)	"Better in Time"	Leona Lewis
2009 (29th)	"Heartbeat"	Scouting for Girls
2009 (29th)	"Mercy"	Duffy
2009 (29th)	"Viva la Vida"	Coldplay
2009 (29th)	Eliminated	
2009 (29th)	"American Boy"	Estelle featuring Kanye West
2009 (29th)	"Chasing Pavements"	Adele
2009 (29th)	"Dance wiv Me"	Dizzee Rascal featuring Calvin Harris & Chrome
2009 (29th)	"Hallelujah"	Alexandra Burke
2009 (29th)	"Hero"	The X Factor Finalists 2008

=== 2010s ===
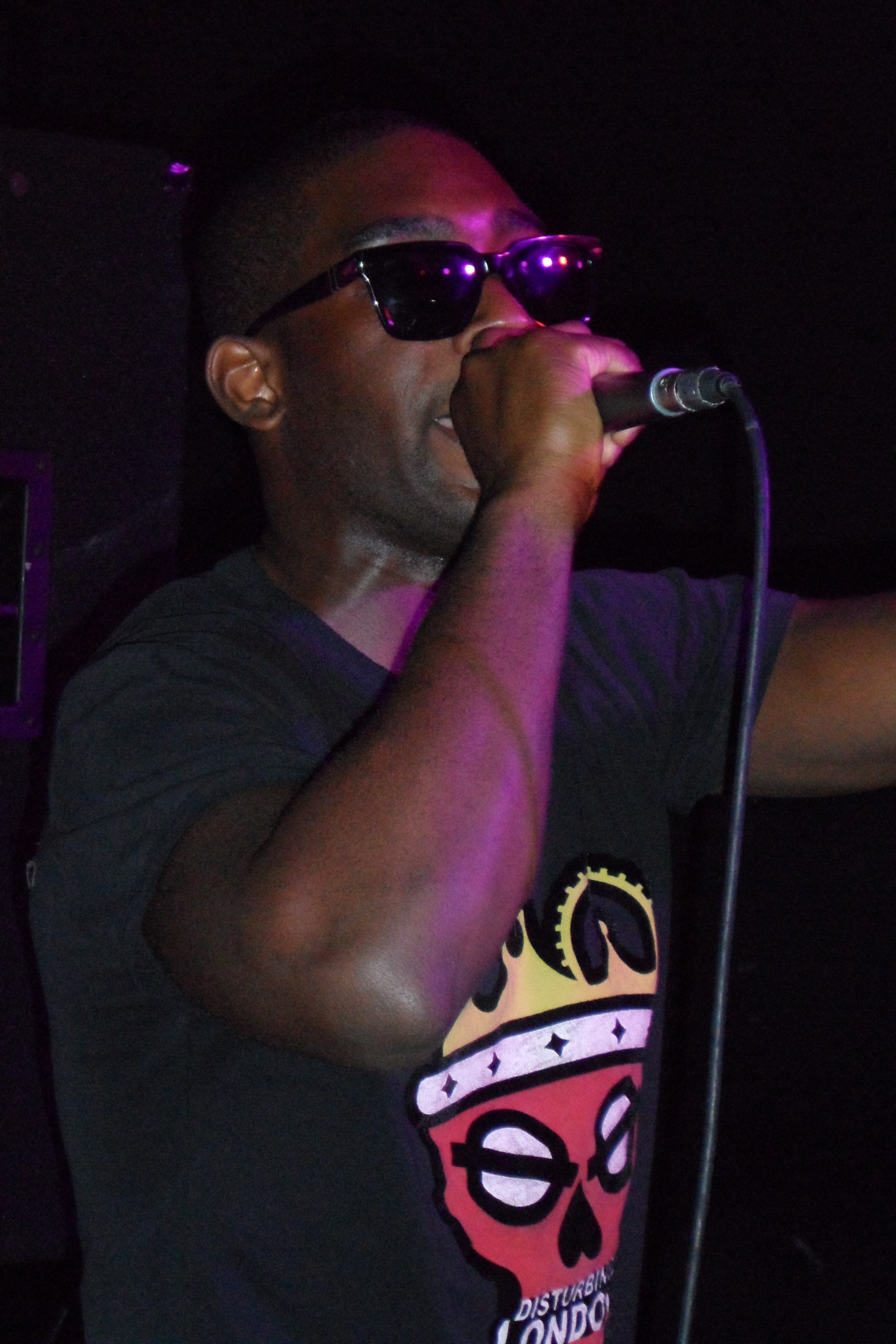
2011 winner Tinie Tempah

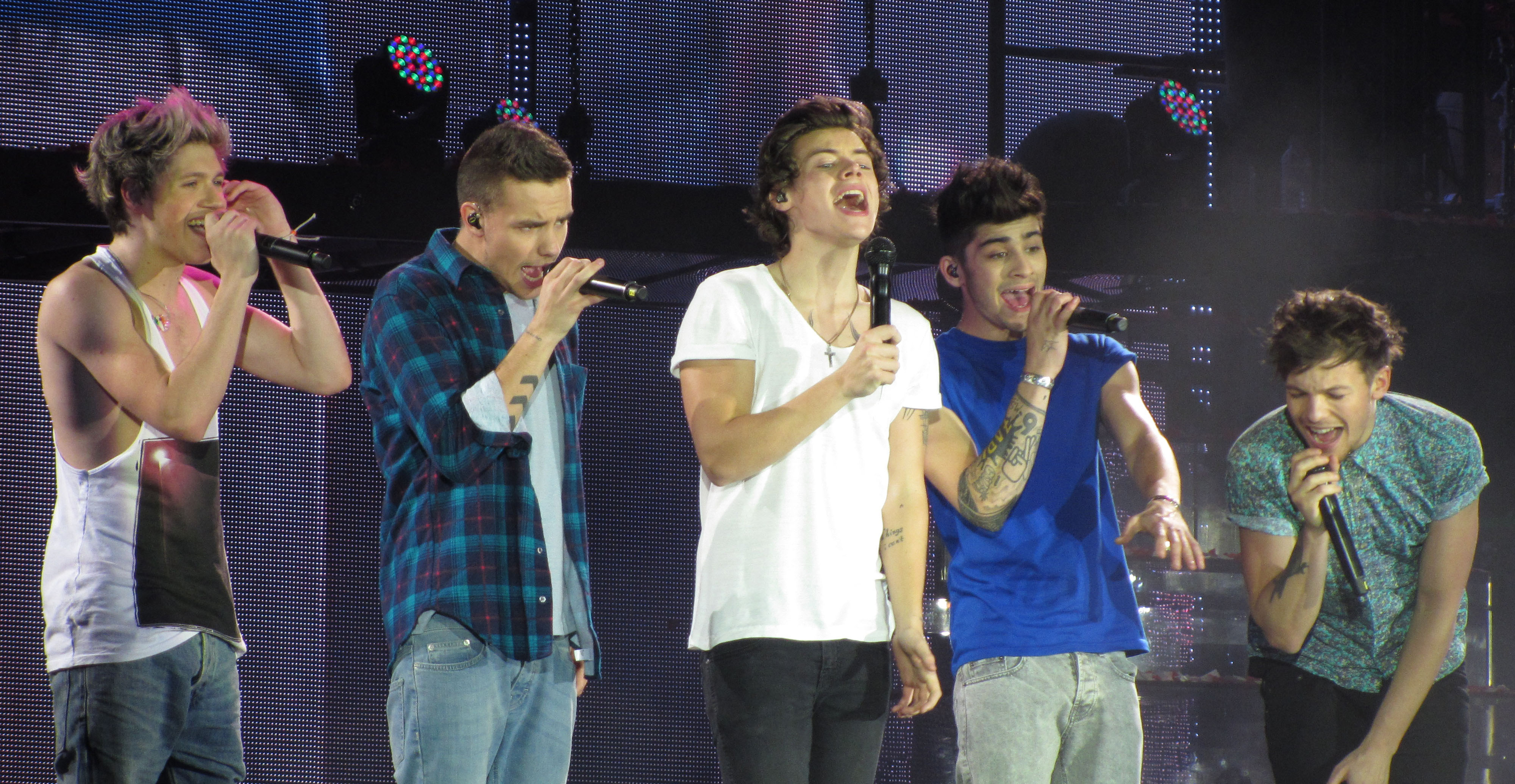
One Direction won for their debut single "What Makes You Beautiful"

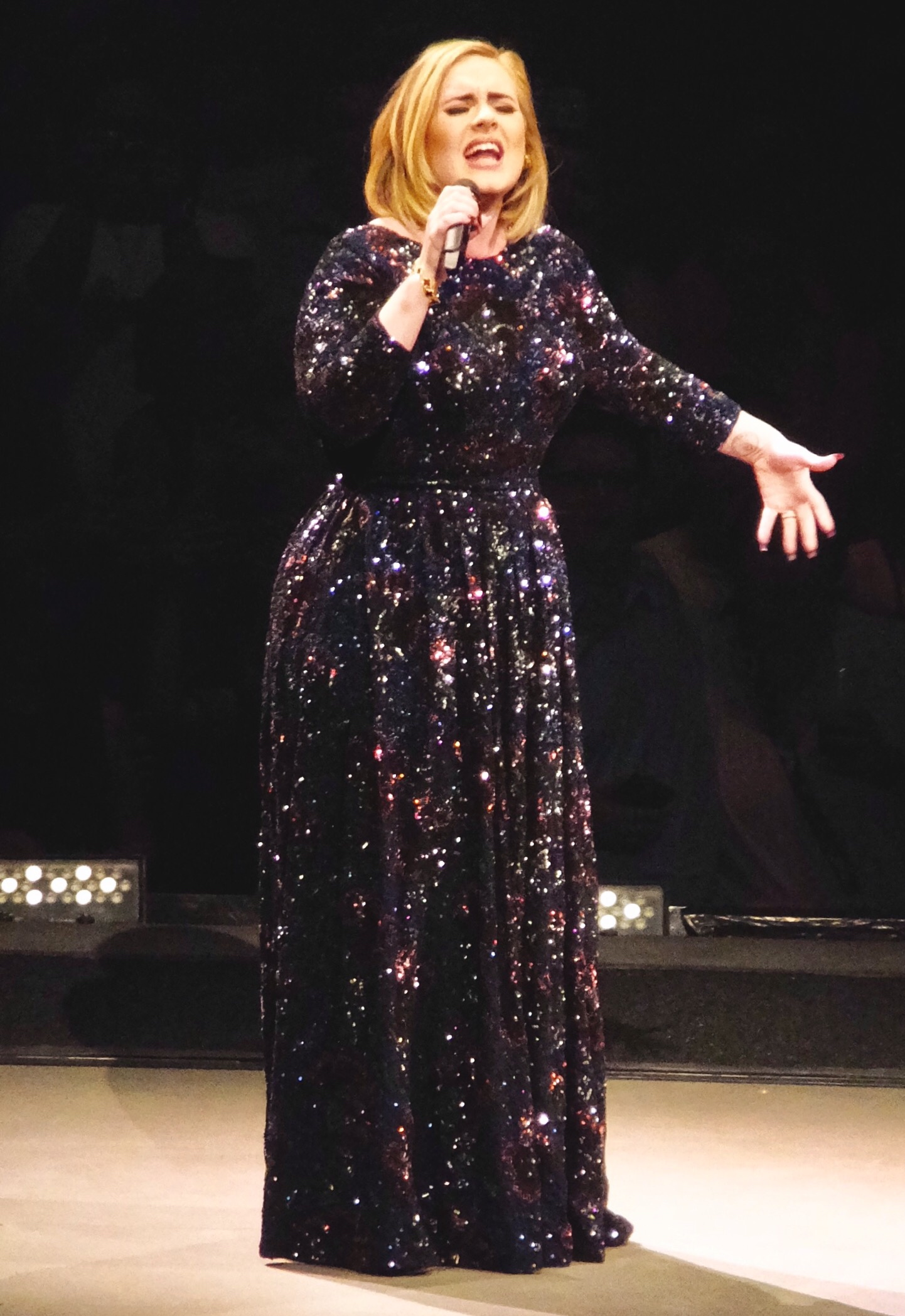
Three-time recipient Adele

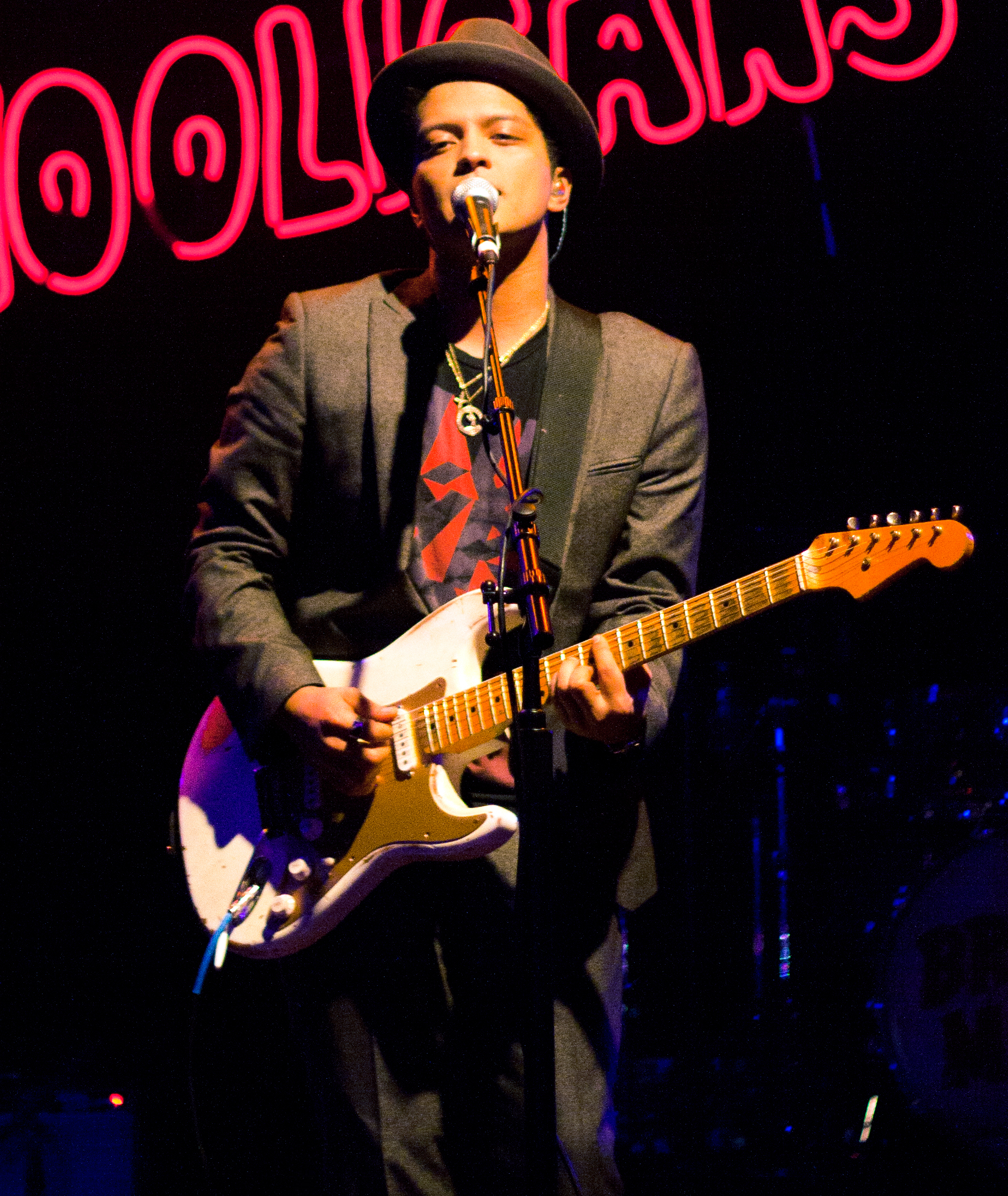
Bruno Mars is the first non-British recipient of the award, winning as a featured artist on Ronson's "Uptown Funk"

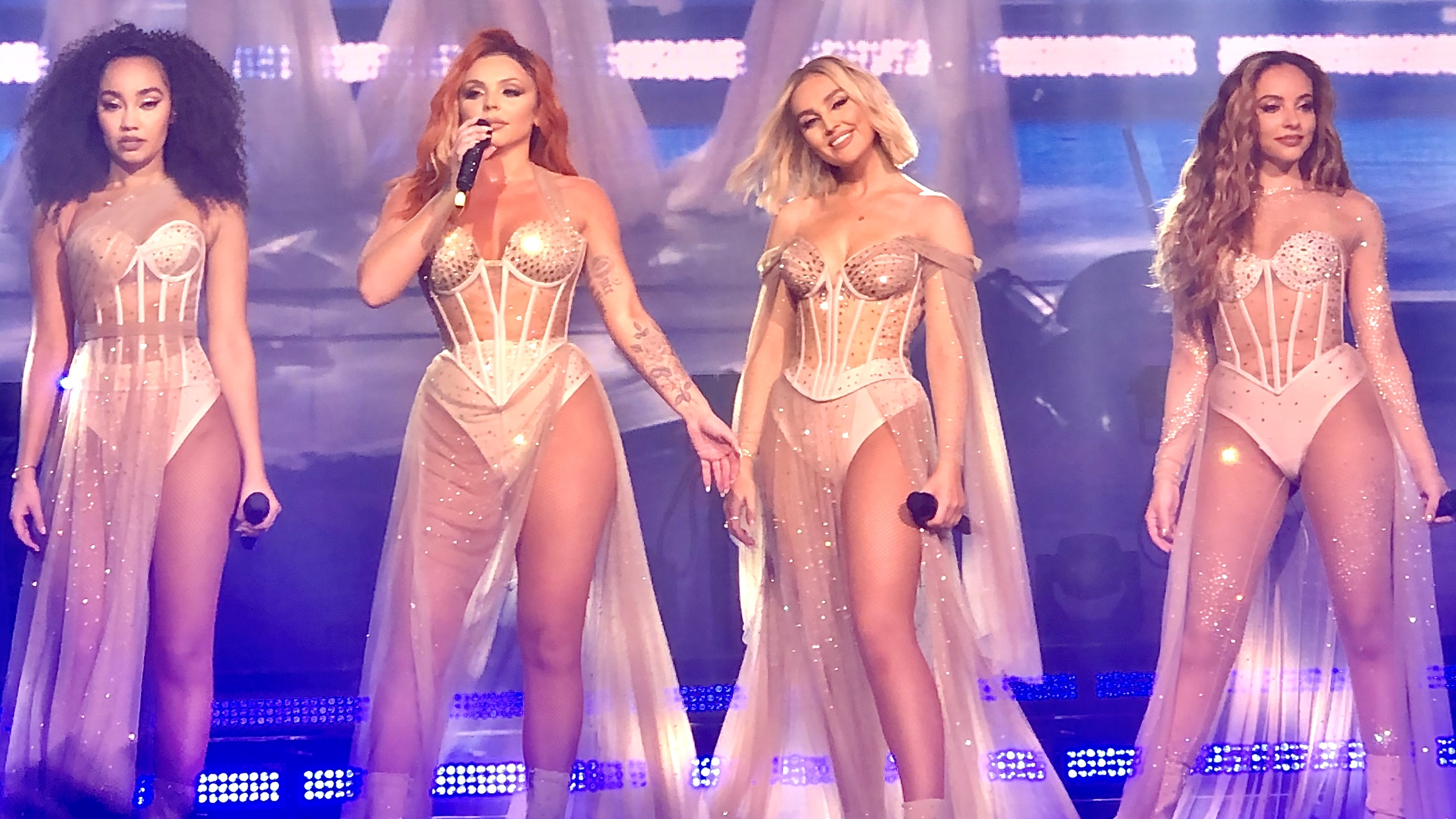
Little Mix won the award in 2017

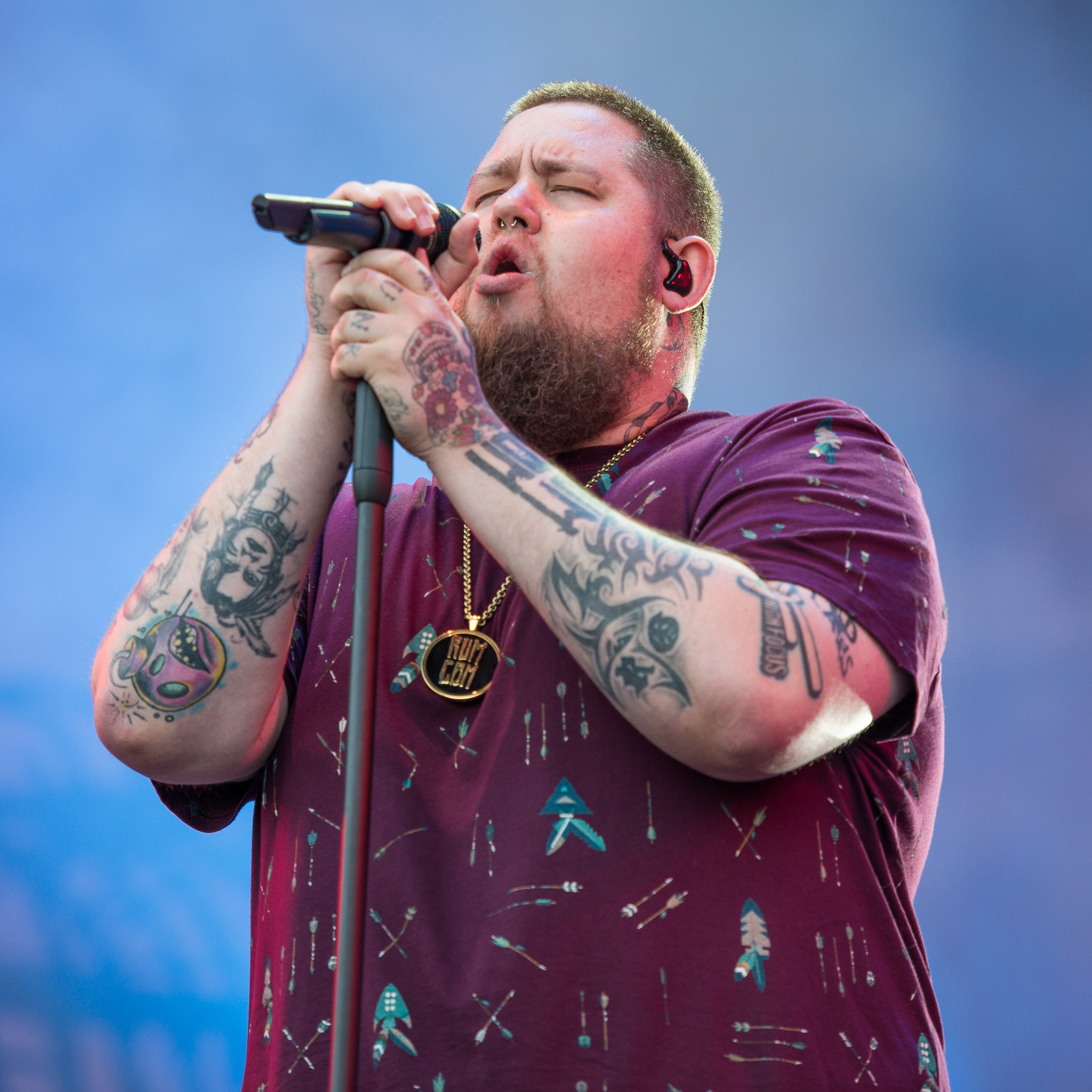
2018 winner Rag'n'Bone Man

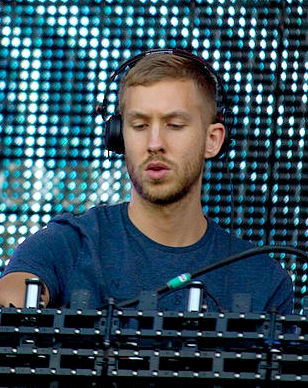
2019 winner and nine-time nominee Calvin Harris

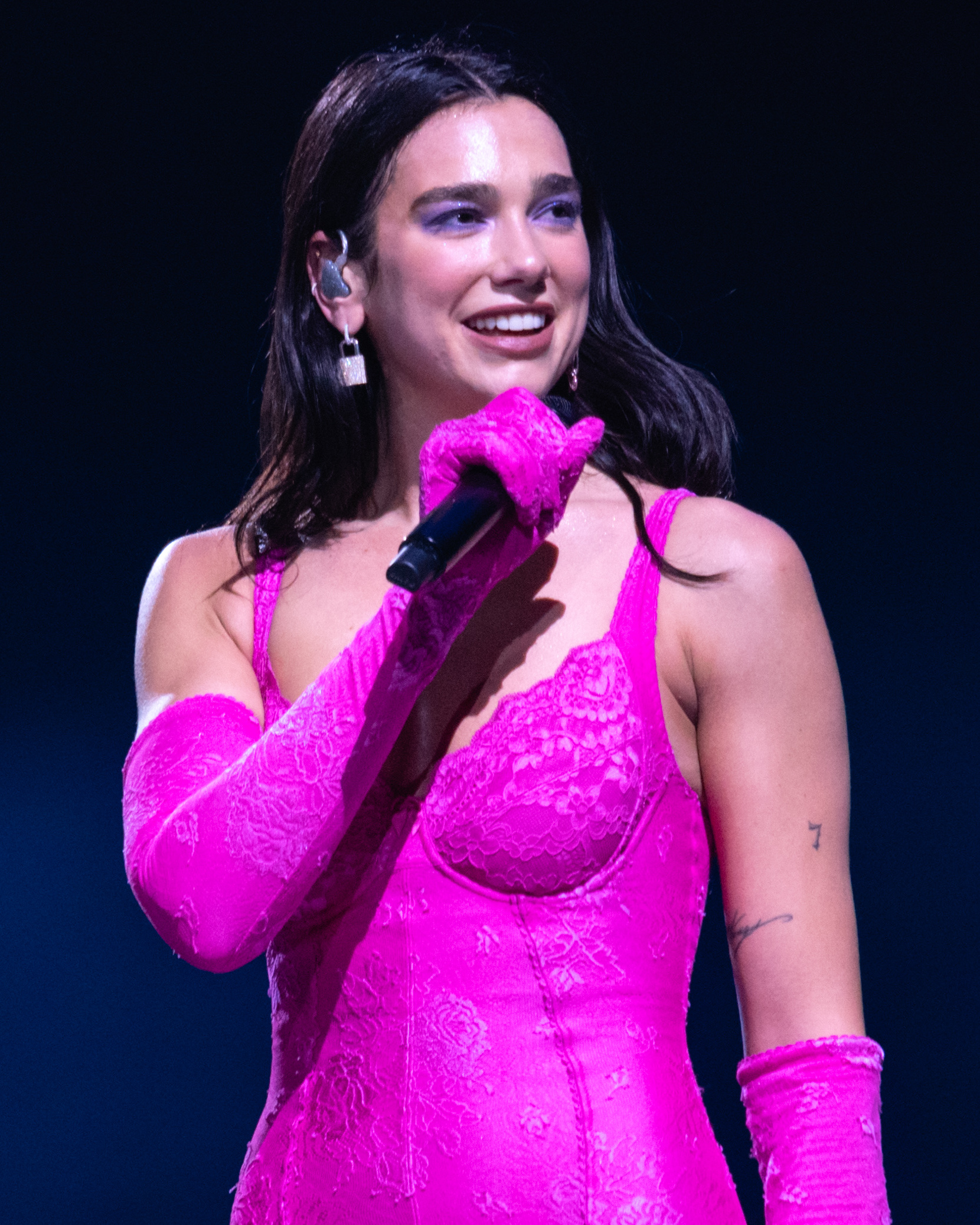
Dua Lipa won the award for featuring on Harris' "One Kiss", and is the most-nominated woman in the category

Year	Single	Artist(s)
2010 (30th)
2010 (30th)	"Beat Again"	JLS
2010 (30th)	"Bad Boys"	Alexandra Burke featuring Flo Rida
2010 (30th)	"Break Your Heart"	Taio Cruz
2010 (30th)	"Breathe Slow"	Alesha Dixon
2010 (30th)	"The Climb"	Joe McElderry
2010 (30th)	"The Fear"	Lily Allen
2010 (30th)	"Fight for This Love"	Cheryl
2010 (30th)	"In for the Kill"	La Roux
2010 (30th)	"Mama Do (Uh Oh, Uh Oh)"	Pixie Lott
2010 (30th)	"Number 1"	Tinchy Stryder featuring N-Dubz
2011 (31st)
2011 (31st)	"Pass Out"	Tinie Tempah featuring Labrinth
2011 (31st)	"All Night Long"	Alexandra Burke featuring Pitbull
2011 (31st)	"All Time Low"	The Wanted
2011 (31st)	"Dynamite"	Taio Cruz
2011 (31st)	"Many of Horror"	Matt Cardle
2011 (31st)	"Parachute"	Cheryl
2011 (31st)	"Please Don't Let Me Go"	Olly Murs
2011 (31st)	"She Said"	Plan B
2011 (31st)	"This Ain't a Love Song"	Scouting for Girls
2011 (31st)	"You Got the Love"	Florence and the Machine
2012 (32nd)
2012 (32nd)	"What Makes You Beautiful"	One Direction
2012 (32nd)	"The A Team"	Ed Sheeran
2012 (32nd)	"All About Tonight"	Pixie Lott
2012 (32nd)	"Changed the Way You Kiss Me"	Example
2012 (32nd)	"Glad You Came"	The Wanted
2012 (32nd)	"Heart Skips a Beat"	Olly Murs featuring Rizzle Kicks
2012 (32nd)	"Price Tag"	Jessie J featuring B.o.B
2012 (32nd)	"She Makes Me Wanna"	JLS featuring Dev
2012 (32nd)	"Someone like You"	Adele
2012 (32nd)	"Wherever You Are"	Military Wives featuring Gareth Malone
2013 (33rd)
2013 (33rd)	"Skyfall"	Adele
2013 (33rd)	"Beneath Your Beautiful"	Labrinth featuring Emeli Sandé
2013 (33rd)	"Black Heart"	Stooshe
2013 (33rd)	"Candy"	Robbie Williams
2013 (33rd)	"Domino"	Jessie J
2013 (33rd)	"Feel the Love"	Rudimental featuring John Newman
2013 (33rd)	"Hot Right Now"	DJ Fresh featuring Rita Ora
2013 (33rd)	"Impossible"	James Arthur
2013 (33rd)	"Mama Do the Hump"	Rizzle Kicks
2013 (33rd)	"Next to Me"	Emeli Sandé
2013 (33rd)	"Princess of China"	Coldplay & Rihanna
2013 (33rd)	"R.I.P."	Rita Ora featuring Tinie Tempah
2013 (33rd)	"Spectrum (Say My Name)"	Florence and the Machine
2013 (33rd)	"Too Close"	Alex Clare
2013 (33rd)	"Troublemaker"	Olly Murs featuring Flo Rida
2014 (34th)
2014 (34th)	"Waiting All Night"	Rudimental featuring Ella Eyre
2014 (34th)	"Burn"	Ellie Goulding
2014 (34th)	"Dear Darlin'"	Olly Murs
2014 (34th)	"I Need Your Love"	Calvin Harris featuring Ellie Goulding
2014 (34th)	"La La La"	Naughty Boy featuring Sam Smith
2014 (34th)	"Let Her Go"	Passenger
2014 (34th)	"Love Me Again"	John Newman
2014 (34th)	"One Way or Another (Teenage Kicks)"	One Direction
2014 (34th)	"Pompeii"	Bastille
2014 (34th)	"White Noise"	Disclosure featuring AlunaGeorge
2015 (35th)
2015 (35th)	"Uptown Funk"	Mark Ronson featuring Bruno Mars
2015 (35th)	"Budapest"	George Ezra
2015 (35th)	"Ghost"	Ella Henderson
2015 (35th)	"I Got U"	Duke Dumont featuring Jax Jones
2015 (35th)	"My Love"	Route 94 featuring Jess Glynne
2015 (35th)	"Nobody to Love"	Sigma
2015 (35th)	"Rather Be"	Clean Bandit featuring Jess Glynne
2015 (35th)	"Stay with Me"	Sam Smith
2015 (35th)	"Summer"	Calvin Harris
2015 (35th)	"Thinking Out Loud"	Ed Sheeran
2016 (36th)
2016 (36th)	"Hello"	Adele
2016 (36th)	"Black Magic"	Little Mix
2016 (36th)	"Bloodstream"	Ed Sheeran & Rudimental
2016 (36th)	"Hold Back the River"	James Bay
2016 (36th)	"Hold My Hand"	Jess Glynne
2016 (36th)	"How Deep Is Your Love"	Calvin Harris & Disciples
2016 (36th)	"King"	Years & Years
2016 (36th)	"Love Me like You Do"	Ellie Goulding
2016 (36th)	"Up"	Olly Murs featuring Demi Lovato
2016 (36th)	"Wish You Were Mine"	Philip George
2017 (37th)
2017 (37th)	"Shout Out to My Ex"	Little Mix
2017 (37th)	"Dancing on My Own"	Calum Scott
2017 (37th)	"Faded"	Alan Walker
2017 (37th)	"Fast Car"	Jonas Blue featuring Dakota
2017 (37th)	"Girls Like"	Tinie Tempah featuring Zara Larsson
2017 (37th)	"Hymn for the Weekend"	Coldplay
2017 (37th)	"Pillowtalk"	Zayn
2017 (37th)	"Rockabye"	Clean Bandit featuring Sean Paul & Anne-Marie
2017 (37th)	"Say You Won't Let Go"	James Arthur
2017 (37th)	"This Is What You Came For"	Calvin Harris featuring Rihanna
2018 (38th)
2018 (38th)	"Human"	Rag'n'Bone Man
2018 (38th)	"Did You See"	J Hus
2018 (38th)	"Feels"	Calvin Harris featuring Pharrell Williams, Katy Perry & Big Sean
2018 (38th)	"Mama"	Jonas Blue featuring William Singe
2018 (38th)	"New Rules"	Dua Lipa
2018 (38th)	"Shape of You"	Ed Sheeran
2018 (38th)	"Strip That Down"	Liam Payne featuring Quavo
2018 (38th)	"Symphony"	Clean Bandit featuring Zara Larsson
2018 (38th)	"Touch"	Little Mix
2018 (38th)	"You Don't Know Me"	Jax Jones featuring Raye
2019 (39th)
2019 (39th)	"One Kiss"	Calvin Harris & Dua Lipa
2019 (39th)	"2002"	Anne-Marie
2019 (39th)	"Barking"	Ramz
2019 (39th)	"I'll Be There"	Jess Glynne
2019 (39th)	"IDGAF"	Dua Lipa
2019 (39th)	"Leave a Light On"	Tom Walker
2019 (39th)	"Lullaby"	Sigala & Paloma Faith
2019 (39th)	"Shotgun"	George Ezra
2019 (39th)	"Solo"	Clean Bandit featuring Demi Lovato
2019 (39th)	"These Days"	Rudimental featuring Jess Glynne, Macklemore & Dan Caplen

=== 2020s ===
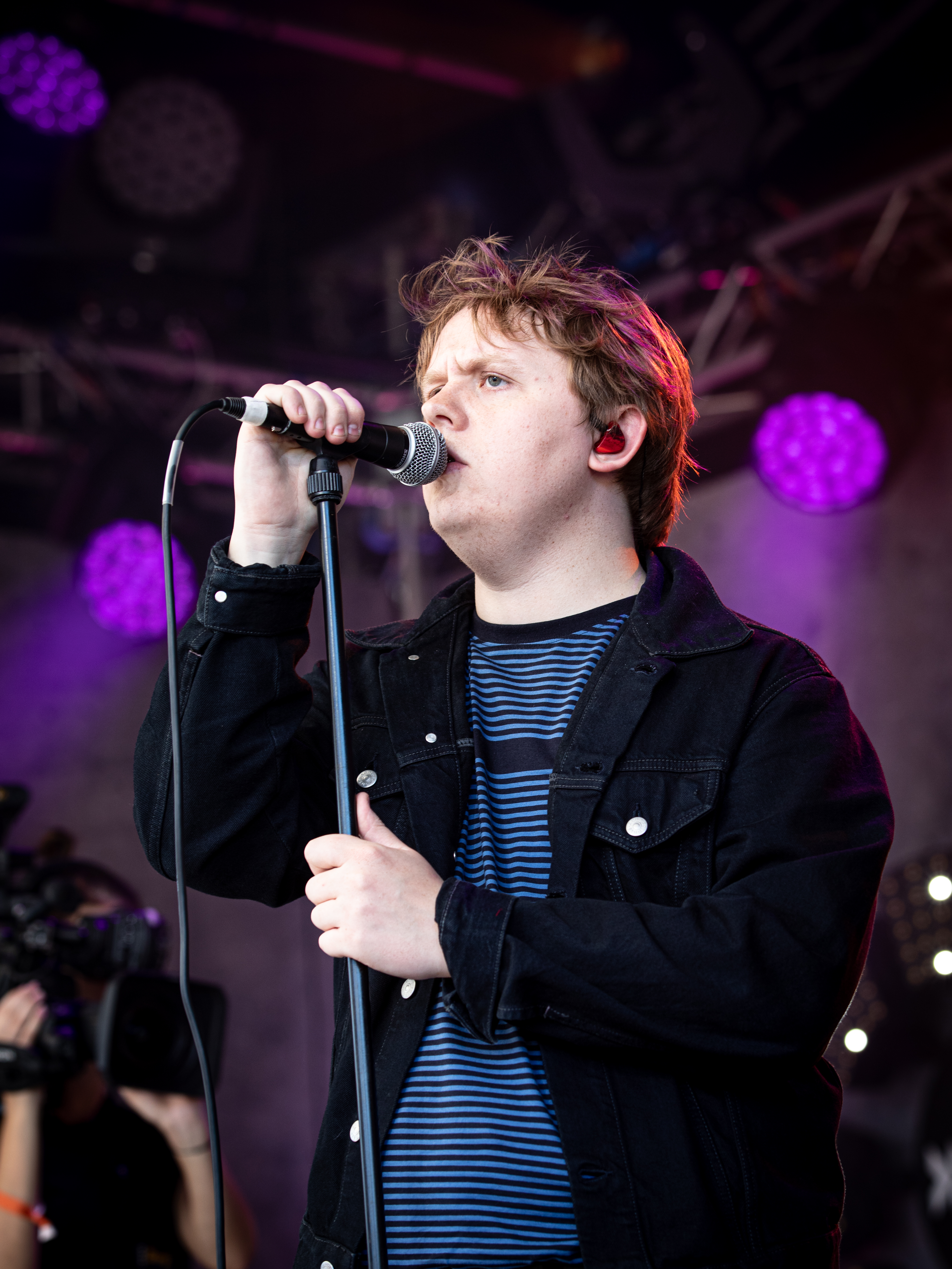
2020 award recipient Lewis Capaldi

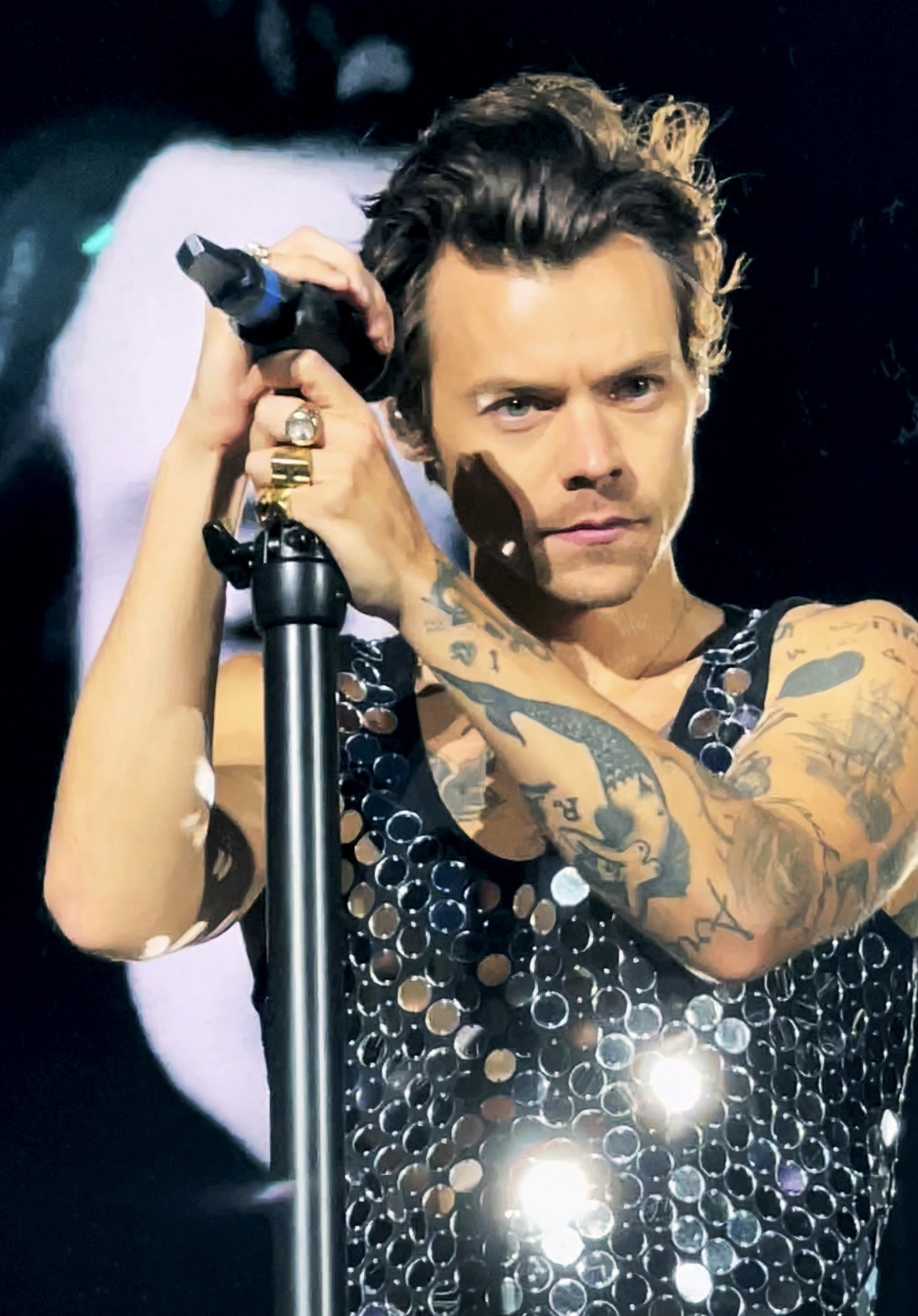
Three-time winner Harry Styles received the award in 2012 as a member of One Direction, and 2021 and 2023 as a solo artist

Year	Single	Artist(s)
2020 (40th)
2020 (40th)	"Someone You Loved"	Lewis Capaldi
2020 (40th)	"Dancing with a Stranger"	Sam Smith & Normani
2020 (40th)	"Don't Call Me Up"	Mabel
2020 (40th)	"Giant"	Calvin Harris & Rag'n'Bone Man
2020 (40th)	"I Don't Care"	Ed Sheeran & Justin Bieber
2020 (40th)	"Just You and I"	Tom Walker
2020 (40th)	"Ladbroke Grove"	AJ Tracey
2020 (40th)	"Location"	Dave featuring Burna Boy
2020 (40th)	"Nothing Breaks Like a Heart"	Mark Ronson featuring Miley Cyrus
2020 (40th)	"Vossi Bop"	Stormzy
2021 (41st)
2021 (41st)	"Watermelon Sugar"	Harry Styles
2021 (41st)	"Ain't It Different"	Headie One featuring AJ Tracey & Stormzy
2021 (41st)	"Don't Need Love"	220 Kid & Gracey
2021 (41st)	"Don't Rush"	Young T & Bugsey featuring Headie One
2021 (41st)	"Head & Heart"	Joel Corry featuring MNEK
2021 (41st)	"Lighter"	Nathan Dawe featuring KSI
2021 (41st)	"Physical"	Dua Lipa
2021 (41st)	"Rain"	Aitch & AJ Tracey featuring Tay Keith
2021 (41st)	"Rover"	S1mba featuring DTG
2021 (41st)	"Secrets"	Regard & Raye
2022 (42nd)
2022 (42nd)	"Easy on Me"	Adele
2022 (42nd)	"Bad Habits"	Ed Sheeran
2022 (42nd)	"Bed"	Joel Corry, Raye & David Guetta
2022 (42nd)	"Body"	Tion Wayne & Russ Millions
2022 (42nd)	"Clash"	Dave featuring Stormzy
2022 (42nd)	"Cold Heart"	Elton John & Dua Lipa
2022 (42nd)	"Don't Play"	Anne-Marie, KSI & Digital Farm Animals
2022 (42nd)	"Friday"	Riton & Nightcrawlers featuring Mufasa & Hypeman
2022 (42nd)	"Heat Waves"	Glass Animals
2022 (42nd)	"Holiday"	KSI
2022 (42nd)	"Latest Trends"	A1 x J1
2022 (42nd)	"Little Bit of Love"	Tom Grennan
2022 (42nd)	"Obsessed with You"	Central Cee
2022 (42nd)	"Remember"	Becky Hill & David Guetta
2022 (42nd)	"Wellerman (220 Kid x Billen Ted remix)"	Nathan Evans, 220 Kid & Billen Ted
2023 (43rd)
2023 (43rd)	"As It Was"	Harry Styles
2023 (43rd)	"Baby"	Aitch & Ashanti
2023 (43rd)	"Go"	Cat Burns
2023 (43rd)	"Starlight"	Dave
2023 (43rd)	"Merry Christmas"	Ed Sheeran & Elton John
2023 (43rd)	"B.O.T.A. (Baddest of Them All)"	Eliza Rose & Interplanetary Criminal
2023 (43rd)	"Green Green Grass"	George Ezra
2023 (43rd)	"Forget Me"	Lewis Capaldi
2023 (43rd)	"Afraid to Feel"	LF System
2023 (43rd)	"Unholy"	Sam Smith & Kim Petras
2024 (44th)
2024 (44th)	"Escapism"	Raye featuring 070 Shake
2024 (44th)	"Miracle"	Calvin Harris & Ellie Goulding
2024 (44th)	"Prada"	Cassö, Raye & D-Block Europe
2024 (44th)	"Let Go"	Central Cee
2024 (44th)	"Sprinter"	Dave & Central Cee
2024 (44th)	"Dance the Night"	Dua Lipa
2024 (44th)	"Eyes Closed"	Ed Sheeran
2024 (44th)	"Who Told You"	J Hus featuring Drake
2024 (44th)	"Strangers"	Kenya Grace
2024 (44th)	"Wish You the Best"	Lewis Capaldi
2024 (44th)	"Boy's a Liar"	PinkPantheress
2024 (44th)	"Dancing is Healing	Rudimental, Charlotte Plank & Vibe Chemistry
2024 (44th)	"Firebabe"	Stormzy featuring Debbie
2024 (44th)	"React"	Switch Disco & Ella Henderson
2024 (44th)	"Messy in Heaven"	Venbee & Goddard.
2025 (45th)
2025 (45th)	"Guess"	Charli XCX featuring Billie Eilish
2025 (45th)	"I Like the Way You Kiss Me"	Artemas
2025 (45th)	"Now and Then"	The Beatles
2025 (45th)	"Kisses"	Bl3ss with CamrinWatsin featuring Bbyclose
2025 (45th)	"Band4Band"	Central Cee featuring Lil Baby
2025 (45th)	"Backbone"	Chase & Status featuring Stormzy
2025 (45th)	"Feelslikeimfallinginlove"	Coldplay
2025 (45th)	"Training Season"	Dua Lipa
2025 (45th)	"Alibi"	Ella Henderson featuring Rudimental
2025 (45th)	"Angel of My Dreams"	JADE
2025 (45th)	"Kehlani"	Jordan Adetunji
2025 (45th)	"Thick of It"	KSI featuring Trippie Redd
2025 (45th)	"Stargazing"	Myles Smith
2025 (45th)	"You're Christmas to Me"	Sam Ryder
2025 (45th)	"Somedays"	Sonny Fodera with Jazzy and D.O.D.
2026 (46th)
2026 (46th)	"Rein Me In"	Sam Fender and Olivia Dean
2026 (46th)	"Blessings"	Calvin Harris and Clementine Douglas
2026 (46th)	"The Days (Notion Remix)"	Chrystal and Notion
2026 (46th)	"Defying Gravity"	Cynthia Erivo and Ariana Grande
2026 (46th)	"Azizam"	Ed Sheeran
2026 (46th)	"Victory Lap"	Fred Again, Skepta and PlaqueBoyMax
2026 (46th)	"Survive"	Lewis Capaldi
2026 (46th)	"Messy"	Lola Young
2026 (46th)	"Nice to Meet You"	Myles Smith
2026 (46th)	"Man I Need"	Olivia Dean
2026 (46th)	"Where Is My Husband!"	Raye
2026 (46th)	"Family Matters"	Skye Newman

== Artists with multiple wins ==
Artists that received multiple awards
Awards	Artist
6	Robbie Williams (Note: Including his three wins as a member of Take That.)
5	Take That
3	Adele
3	Harry Styles (Note: Including his 2012 win as a member of One Direction.)
2	Queen

== Artists with multiple nominations ==
12 nominations

- Robbie Williams (Note: Including five as a member of Take That.)

10 nominations

- Calvin Harris

9 nominations

- Ed Sheeran

8 nominations

- Dua Lipa

7 nominations

- Coldplay
- Rudimental
- Take That

6 nominations

- Raye

5 nominations

- Adele
- Blur
- Jess Glynne
- Olly Murs
- Stormzy

4 nominations

- Central Cee
- Clean Bandit
- Dave
- Ellie Goulding
- George Michael (Note: Including one as a member of Wham!.)
- Jade Thirlwall (Note: Including three as a member of Little Mix.)
- KSI
- Lewis Capaldi
- Oasis
- Sam Smith
- Harry Styles (Note: Including two as a member of One Direction.)
- Sugababes

3 nominations

- AJ Tracey
- Alexandra Burke
- Anne-Marie
- Cheryl (Note: Including one as a member of Girls Aloud.)
- Ella Henderson
- George Ezra
- Gareth Gates
- Jason Donovan
- Jive Bunny and the Mastermixers
- Leona Lewis
- Little Mix
- Manic Street Preachers
- Tinie Tempah
- Will Young

2 nominations

- 220 Kid
- Adam and the Ants
- Aitch
- All Saints
- Alesha Dixon (Note: Including one as a member of Mis-Teeq.)
- Atomic Kitten
- David Guetta
- Demi Lovato
- Elton John
- Emeli Sande
- Fatboy Slim
- Florence and the Machine
- Frankie Goes to Hollywood
- Geri Halliwell (Note: Including one as a member of the Spice Girls.)
- Headie One
- J Hus
- Jamelia
- James Arthur
- James Blunt
- Jax Jones
- Jessie J
- JLS
- Joel Corry
- John Newman
- Jonas Blue
- Labrinth
- Lily Allen
- Mark Ronson
- Moloko
- Myles Smith
- Olivia Dean
- One Direction
- Paul McCartney (Note: Including one as a member of The Beatles.)
- Pet Shop Boys
- Pixie Lott
- Queen
- Rachel Stevens (Note: Including one as a member of S Club 7.)
- Radiohead
- Rag'n'Bone Man
- Rihanna
- Rita Ora
- Rizzle Kicks
- Siobhan Fahey (Note: Including one as a member of Bananarama and one as a member of Shakespears Sister.)
- Taio Cruz
- Tom Jones
- Tom Walker
- Zara Larsson

== Notes ==
- "Do They Know It's Christmas?" (1990, 2005) Double Nominated
- "Pray" (1994), "Parklife" (1995), "Never Ever" (1998), "She's the One" (2000), "Rock DJ" (2001) also won Brit Award for British Video of the Year
- "Angels" (2005) also won Brit Award for British Song of Twenty Five Year
- "Wannabe" (2010) also won Brit Award for Live Performance of Thirty Year
