= Kisses (song) =

2024 single by Bl3ss and CamrinWatsin featuring bbyclose

Single by Bl3ss and CamrinWatsin featuring bbyclose
- Released: 22 March 2024
- Genre: Trance
- Length: 2:18
- Label: Signal >> Supply; Warner
- Songwriters: John Morgan; Sarah Close; Stevie Appleton; Will Lansley; Will Manning
- Producers: BL3SS; Camrinwatsin; Punctual

Bl3ss and CamrinWatsin featuring bbyclose singles chronology
"Losing My Head" (2023)	"Kisses" (2024)	"Craving 4 U" (2024)

"Kisses" is a song by Bl3ss and CamrinWatsin featuring bbyclose was released on 22 March 2024, becoming a viral hit and peaking at number five on the UK Singles Chart.

== Track listings ==
Remixes
No.	Title	Length
1.	"Kisses"	2:18
2.	"Kisses" (Bovski remix)	2:10
3.	"Kisses" (Kak Hatt remix)	1:28
4.	"Kisses" (sped up)	2:02
5.	"Kisses" (Evan McGee remix)	3:10
6.	"Kisses" (Badger remix)	2:06

== Charts ==
=== Weekly charts ===
Weekly chart performance for "Kisses"
Chart (2024–2025)	Peak position
Australia (ARIA)	26
Australia Dance (ARIA)	1
Austria (Ö3 Austria Top 40)	42
Belgium (Ultratop 50 Flanders)	16
CIS Airplay (TopHit)	182
Czech Republic Singles Digital (ČNS IFPI)	96
Estonia Airplay (TopHit)	22
Germany (GfK)	32
Ireland (IRMA)	7
Latvia Airplay (TopHit)	149
Lithuania (AGATA)	55
Lithuania Airplay (TopHit)	37
Netherlands (Dutch Top 40)	21
Netherlands (Single Top 100)	15
Poland (Polish Airplay Top 100)	26
Poland (Polish Streaming Top 100)	22
Slovakia Singles Digital (ČNS IFPI)	55
Switzerland (Schweizer Hitparade)	93
UK Singles (Official Charts)	5
UK Dance (Official Charts)	1
US Hot Dance/Electronic Songs (Billboard)	20

=== Monthly charts ===
Monthly chart performance for "Kisses"
Chart (2024)	Peak position
Estonia Airplay (TopHit)	25
Lithuania Airplay (TopHit)	55

=== Year-end charts ===
2024 year-end chart performance for "Kisses"
Chart (2024)	Position
Australia Dance (ARIA)	20
Belgium (Ultratop 50 Flanders)	93
Estonia Airplay (TopHit)	85
Netherlands (Dutch Top 40)	88
UK Singles (OCC)	34

2025 year-end chart performance for "Kisses"
Chart (2025)	Position
Australia (ARIA)	51
Belgium (Ultratop 50 Flanders)	41
Netherlands (Single Top 100)	87
Poland (Polish Streaming Top 100)	63
UK Singles (OCC)	63

== Certifications ==
Certifications for "Kisses"
Region	Certification	Certified units/sales
Australia (ARIA)	2× Platinum	140,000^{‡}
Austria (IFPI Austria)	Gold	15,000^{‡}
Belgium (BRMA)	Gold	20,000^{‡}
Denmark (IFPI Danmark)	Gold	45,000^{‡}
France (SNEP)	Gold	100,000^{‡}
Germany (BVMI)	Gold	300,000^{‡}
Netherlands (NVPI)	Platinum	93,000^{‡}
New Zealand (RMNZ)	2× Platinum	60,000^{‡}
Poland (ZPAV)	Platinum	125,000^{‡}
Switzerland (IFPI Switzerland)	Gold	15,000^{‡}
United Kingdom (BPI)	2× Platinum	1,200,000^{‡}
^{‡} Sales+streaming figures based on certification alone.
