= Bl3ss =

English electronic dance DJ

BL3SS
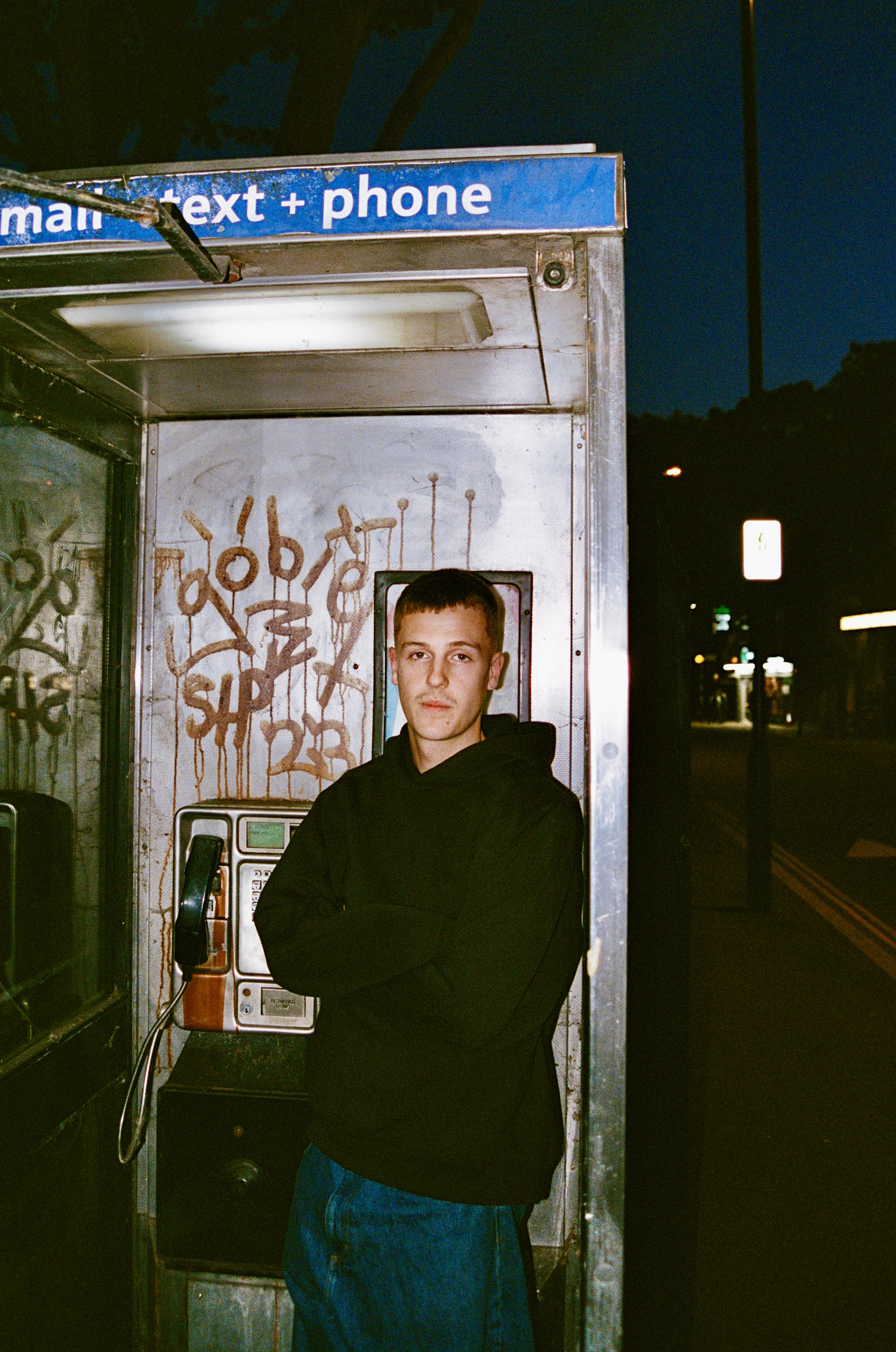
- BL3SS in a London phone box in 2024

Background information
- Born: Flynn Haddigan
- Origin: London, England
- Genres: Electronic; Trance; Dance; House
- Works: BL3SS discography
- Years active: 2022–present
- Labels: Signal >> Supply; Warner

Flynn Haddigan, known professionally as BL3SS, is a DJ and producer based in London, England. Flynn starting producing music while at the University of Manchester during the COVID-19 pandemic in the United Kingdom. When the pandemic's restrictions ended, Flynn began DJing at house parties under the stage name of BL3SS. He then went on to perform in clubs and at festivals across the country.

In March 2024, BL3SS released the song, "Kisses", together with CamrinWatsin and featuring bbyclose. It went viral and charted in Germany and the United Kingdom. Referred to as "the new generation of British talent", it reached the top 10 at number 5 in the British charts and was a candidate for Song of the Summer, but then only ranked at number 25. The song was also played at Tomorrowland. In November 2024, BL3SS, CamrinWatsin and bbyclose teamed up again to create "Craving 4 U".

Using the sampled vocals of the 2023 record "Artumi" by The Days singer Chrystal. BL3SS collaborated with French DJ and producer Tchami to create "R 2 ME", released in April 2025. Most recently, BL3SS joined forces with Luxembourg-born electronic DJ, Gravagerz, for their single "Afters" which came out in August 2025.

== Discography ==
=== Extended plays ===
List of EPs, with selected details
Title	Details
The Afters	Released: 7 November 2025

=== Charted singles ===
List of charted singles, with selected chart positions
Title	Year	Chart positions							Certification
Title	Year	UK	AUS	AUT	GER	IRE	LIT	SWI	Certification
"Kisses" (with CamrinWatsin featuring bbyclose)	2024	5	26	42	32	7	55	93	BPI: 2× Platinum; ARIA: 2× Platinum; BVMI: Gold; IFPI AUT: Gold; IFPI SUI: Gold
"Craving 4 U" (with CamrinWatsin featuring bbyclose)	2025	72	—	—	—	—	—	—	
