= Sarah Close =

English singer-songwriter

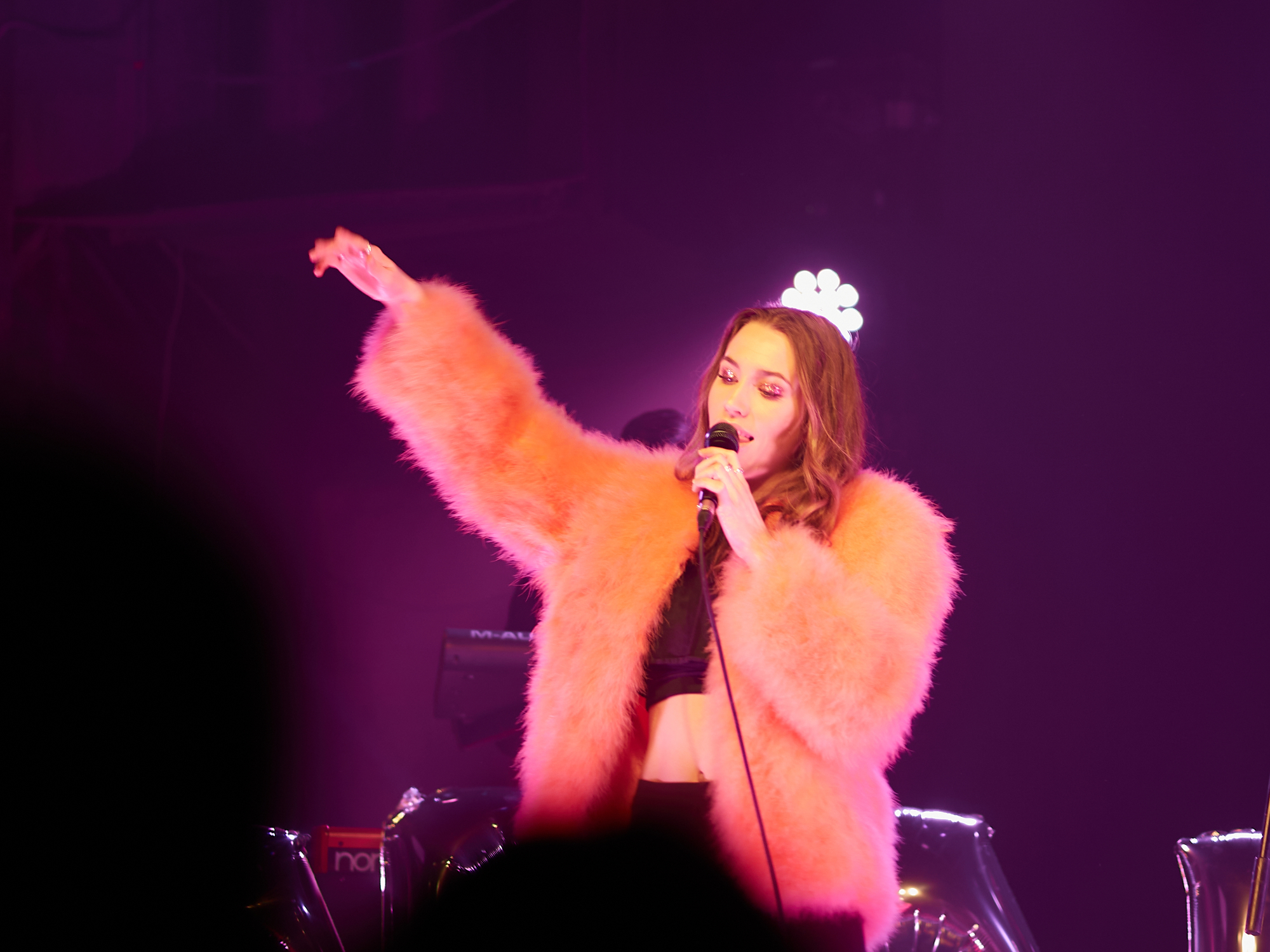
- Close in 2017

Background information
- Born: Sarah Elizabeth Close; 27 April 1995 (age 31); Isle of Wight, England
- Occupation: Singer-songwriter
- Instruments: Vocals; guitar; piano
- Years active: 2010–present
- Labels: Parlophone; The Kodiak Club; LAB Records
- Website: www.sarahclose.co.uk

Sarah Elizabeth Close (born 27 April 1995 is an English singer-songwriter. She gained popularity posting covers of songs on her YouTube channel. She released her debut single, "Call Me Out" on 3 March 2017, followed by her debut extended play Caught Up on 14 April 2017. In July 2017, she signed a record deal with Parlophone Records, but was dropped in 2018. Close then began releasing music under her own record label, The Kodiak Club. Close released her debut album And Now, We're Shining on 20 March 2020.

== Early life ==
Sarah Close was born on 27 April 1995 on the Isle of Wight. In 2009, she began posting covers of songs on YouTube. Close attended Ryde School where she completed her A-levels in Biology, English Literature and Spanish. At the age of 18, Close moved to London to attend The Institute of Contemporary Music Performance where she studied music and songwriting.

== Career ==
=== 2017: Caught Up ===
Close released her debut single "Call Me Out" on 3 March 2017. The song was accompanied by a music video on 8 March 2017. Her debut extended play, Caught Up, was released on 14 April 2017, and was shortly followed by the music video for the EP's title track "Caught Up" on 20 April 2017. Following the release of the Caught Up EP, "Call Me Out" charted at number one on the UK Official Physical Singles Chart. In July 2017, she performed at British Summer Time in Hyde Park.

=== 2017–present: And Now, We're Shining ===
Close released her second single, "Only You", on 15 September 2017. In February, Close was dropped by Parlophone Records, and later began releasing music under her own label, The Kodiak Club. She then released her third single, "You Say", on 18 July 2018. This was followed by two further singles, titled "Crazy Kind" and "London". On 29 November 2019, Close released her sixth single "Almost". On the day of its release, she announced that her debut mini-album, And Now, We're Shining, was set for release on 20 March 2020. She released two singles, "Cool" on 23 January 2020 and "If It Was Me" on 28 February 2020 before releasing the album.

== Discography ==
=== Albums ===
Title	Details	Chart peak
Title	Details	UK Ind.
Caught Up (EP)	Released: 14 April 2017; Label: The Kodiak Club; Format: CD, Digital download	—
And Now, We're Shining	Released: 20 March 2020; Label: The Kodiak Club; Format: CD, digital download, LP	16
And Now, We’re Shining (Acoustic) (EP)	Released: 3 July 2020; Label: The Kodiak Club; Format: Digital download	—

=== Singles ===
Title	Year	Album
"Call Me Out"	2017	Caught Up
"Only You"	2017	Non-album single
"You Say"	2018	And Now, We're Shining
"Crazy Kind"	2018	And Now, We're Shining
"This Christmas"	2018	Non-album single
"London"	2019	Non-album single
"Almost"	2019	And Now, We're Shining
"Cool"	2020	And Now, We're Shining
"If It Was Me"	2020	And Now, We're Shining
"Head & Heart"	2020	Non-album single
"Forgive or Forget"	2021	TBA
"I Can’t Trust Myself"	2021	TBA

=== Music videos ===
Title	Year	Director
"Call Me Out"	2017	Ed Moustafa
"Caught Up"	2017	Ed Moustafa
"Only You"	2017	Callum McGinley
"You Say"	2018	Sarah Close & Rvbberduck
"Crazy Kind"	2018	Sarah Close & Rvbberduck
"London"	2019	Unknown
"Almost (Acoustic)"	2020	Konstantin
"Cool"	2020	Dan French
"Forgive or Forget"	2021	Unknown

== Filmography ==
Music videos
Year	Title	Artist(s)	Role	Ref.
2025	"365"	Talia Mar	Herself	
