= List of number-one country albums of 2026 (Australia) =

ARIA Charts number-one country albums of 2026 < 2025

Other Australian number-one charts of 2026
- albums
- singles
- urban singles
- dance singles
- club tracks
- digital tracks
- streaming tracks

These are the Australian Country number-one albums of 2026, per the ARIA Charts.

== Chart history ==
Issue date	Album	Artist
5 January	I'm the Problem	Morgan Wallen
12 January	I'm the Problem	Morgan Wallen
19 January	With Heaven on Top	Zach Bryan
26 January	With Heaven on Top	Zach Bryan
2 February	I'm the Problem	Morgan Wallen
9 February	I'm the Problem	Morgan Wallen
16 February	I'm the Problem	Morgan Wallen
23 February	I'm the Problem	Morgan Wallen
2 March	Rockhampton Hangover	Tom Busby
9 March	I'm The Problem	Morgan Wallen
16 March	I'm The Problem	Morgan Wallen
23 March	I'm The Problem	Morgan Wallen
30 March	The Way I Am	Luke Combs
6 April	The Way I Am	Luke Combs
13 April	The Way I Am	Luke Combs
20 April	Dandelion	Ella Langley
27 April	Dandelion	Ella Langley
4 May	Dandelion	Ella Langley
11 May	Dandelion	Ella Langley
18 May	Dandelion	Ella Langley
25 May	Dandelion	Ella Langley
1 June	Dandelion	Ella Langley
8 June	Dandelion	Ella Langley
15 June	Dandelion	Ella Langley
22 June	Flow State	Keith Urban
29 June	Dandelion	Ella Langley
6 July	Dandelion	Ella Langley
13 July	Dandelion	Ella Langley
20 July	Dandelion	Ella Langley
27 July	Dandelion	Ella Langley
3 August	Dandelion	Ella Langley
10 August	Dandelion	Ella Langley
17 August	Made for This	Casey Barnes
24 August	Dandelion	Ella Langley
31 August	Long Way Home	Stella Lefty
7 September	Souls on Show	Brooke McClymont and Adam Eckersley
14 September	Dandelion	Ella Langley
21 September	Dandelion	Ella Langley
28 September	Dandelion	Ella Langley
5 October	Dandelion	Ella Langley
12 October	Dandelion	Ella Langley
19 October	Dandelion	Ella Langley
26 October	Young Manhood and Other Donatable Organs	Zach Bryan
2 November	Young Manhood and Other Donatable Organs	Zach Bryan
9 November	Traditions	Fanny Lumsden
16 November	Dandelion	Ella Langley
23 November	Dandelion	Ella Langley

== See also ==
- 2026 in music
- List of number-one albums of 2026 (Australia)
