= List of number-one Australian Artist singles of 2025 (Australia) =

ARIA Charts number-one Australian Artist singles of 2025 < 2024 2026 >

Other Australian number-one charts of 2025
- albums
- singles
- urban singles
- dance singles
- club tracks
- digital tracks
- streaming tracks

Top Australian singles and albums of 2025
- Triple J Hottest 100
- top 25 singles
- top 25 albums

The ARIA Singles Chart ranks the best-performing singles in Australia. Its data, published by the Australian Recording Industry Association, is based collectively on the weekly streams and digital and physical sales of singles.

To be eligible to appear on the chart, the recording must be a single produced by an artist of Australian nationality. Starting from 8 September, ARIA changed the eligibility to require the track have been released in the last two years. Older tracks were then placed on the On Replay Chart.

== Chart history ==
List of number-one singles
Issue date	Song	Artist(s)	Ref.
6 January	"Riptide"	Vance Joy	
13 January	"Riptide"	Vance Joy	
20 January	"Riptide"	Vance Joy	
27 January	"Riptide"	Vance Joy	
3 February	"Riptide"	Vance Joy	
10 February	"Riptide"	Vance Joy	
17 February	"Dreamin"	Dom Dolla and Daya	
24 February	"Dreamin"	Dom Dolla and Daya	
3 March	"Riptide"	Vance Joy	
10 March	"Riptide"	Vance Joy	
17 March	"Riptide"	Vance Joy	
24 March	"Riptide"	Vance Joy	
31 March	"Riptide"	Vance Joy	
7 April	"Riptide"	Vance Joy	
14 April	"Riptide"	Vance Joy	
21 April	"Riptide"	Vance Joy	
28 April	"Riptide"	Vance Joy	
5 May	"Riptide"	Vance Joy	
12 May	"Riptide"	Vance Joy	
19 May	"Riptide"	Vance Joy	
26 May	"Riptide"	Vance Joy	
2 June	"Riptide"	Vance Joy	
9 June	"Riptide"	Vance Joy	
16 June	"Don't Dream It's Over"	Crowded House	
23 June	"Don't Dream It's Over"	Crowded House	
30 June	"Don't Dream It's Over"	Crowded House	
7 July	"Don't Dream It's Over"	Crowded House	
14 July	"Don't Dream It's Over"	Crowded House	
21 July	"Don't Dream It's Over"	Crowded House	
28 July	"Don't Dream It's Over"	Crowded House	
4 August	"Don't Dream It's Over"	Crowded House	
11 August	"Don't Dream It's Over"	Crowded House	
18 August	"Don't Dream It's Over"	Crowded House	
25 August	"Don't Dream It's Over"	Crowded House	
1 September	"Don't Dream It's Over"	Crowded House	
8 September	"Dancing2"	Keli Holiday	
15 September	"A Cold Play"	The Kid Laroi	
22 September	"A Cold Play"	The Kid Laroi	
29 September	"A Cold Play"	The Kid Laroi	
6 October	"A Cold Play"	The Kid Laroi	
13 October	"A Cold Play"	The Kid Laroi	
20 October	"Dracula"	Tame Impala	
27 October	"Dracula"	Tame Impala	
3 November	"Dracula"	Tame Impala	
10 November	"Dracula"	Tame Impala	
17 November	"Dracula"	Tame Impala	
24 November	"Dracula"	Tame Impala	
1 December	"Dracula"	Tame Impala	
8 December	"Dracula"	Tame Impala	
15 December	"Dracula"	Tame Impala	
22 December	"Dracula"	Tame Impala	
29 December	"Dracula"	Tame Impala	

== On Replay Chart ==
List of number-one singles
Issue date	Song	Artist(s)	Ref.
8 September	"Don't Dream It's Over"	Crowded House	
15 September	"Don't Dream It's Over"	Crowded House	
22 September	"Don't Dream It's Over"	Crowded House	
29 September	"Don't Dream It's Over"	Crowded House	
6 October	"Don't Dream It's Over"	Crowded House	
13 October	"Don't Dream It's Over"	Crowded House	
20 October	"Don't Dream It's Over"	Crowded House	
27 October	"Don't Dream It's Over"	Crowded House	
3 November	"Don't Dream It's Over"	Crowded House	
10 November	"Don't Dream It's Over"	Crowded House	
17 November	"Don't Dream It's Over"	Crowded House	
24 November	"Thunderstruck"	AC/DC	
1 December	"Thunderstruck"	AC/DC	
8 December	"Don't Dream It's Over"	Crowded House	
15 December	"Snowman"	Sia	
22 December	"Snowman"	Sia	
29 December	"Snowman"	Sia	

== Number-one artists ==
List of number-one artists, with total weeks spent at number one shown - charts combined
Position	Artist	Weeks at No. 1
1	Crowded House	24
2	Vance Joy	21
3	Tame Impala	11
4	The Kid Laroi	5
5	Sia	3
6	Dom Dolla	2
6	AC/DC	2
7	Keli Holiday	1

== See also ==
- 2025 in music
