= List of number-one urban albums of 2026 (Australia) =

ARIA Charts number-one urban albums of 2026 < 2025

Other Australian number-one charts of 2026
- albums
- singles
- urban singles
- dance singles
- club tracks
- digital tracks
- streaming tracks

The ARIA Hip Hop/R&B Albums Chart is a weekly chart that ranks the best-performing hip hop and R&B albums in Australia. It is published by the Australian Recording Industry Association (ARIA), an organisation that collects music data for the weekly ARIA Charts. To be eligible to appear on the chart, the recording must be an album of a predominantly urban nature.

== Chart history ==
Issue date	Album	Artist(s)	Reference
5 January	Chromakopia	Tyler, the Creator	
12 January	Chromakopia	Tyler, the Creator	
19 January	Before I Forget	The Kid Laroi	
26 January	Don't Be Dumb	ASAP Rocky	
2 February	Don't Be Dumb	ASAP Rocky	
9 February	Octane	Don Toliver	
16 February	The Fall-Off	J.Cole	
23 February	Octane	Don Toliver	
2 March	Casino	Baby Keem	
9 March	Octane	Don Toliver	
16 March	Octane	Don Toliver	
23 March	Octane	Don Toliver	
30 March	Octane	Don Toliver	
6 April	Bully	Ye	
13 April	This Music May Contain Hope	Raye	
20 April	This Music May Contain Hope	Raye	
27 April	This Music May Contain Hope	Raye	
4 May	Kehlani	Kehlani	
11 May	Fenian	Kneecap	
18 May	Brown	Chris Brown	
25 May	Iceman	Drake	
1 June	Iceman	Drake	
8 June	Iceman	Drake	
15 June	Do That Again	Malcolm Todd	
22 June	Iceman	Drake	
29 June	Iceman	Drake	
6 July	Iceman	Drake	
13 July	Iceman	Drake	
20 July	Iceman	Drake	
27 July	Iceman	Drake	
3 August	Don't Tap The Glass	Tyler, the Creator	
10 August	Iceman	Drake	
17 August	Iceman	Drake	
24 August	Iceman	Drake	
31 August	Blackprint	Miss Kaninna	
7 September	Fall from the Light	Hilltop Hoods	
14 September	Iceman	Drake	
21 September	Iceman	Drake	
28 September	Iceman	Drake	
5 October	Happiness Anytime	Leon Bridges	
12 October	Habibti	Drake	
19 October	Iceman	Drake	
26 October	Iceman	Drake	
2 November	Iceman	Drake	
9 November	Iceman	Drake	
16 November	Before I Forget	The Kid Laroi	
23 November	Day of the Dog	Bliss n Eso	

== See also ==
- 2026 in music
- List of number-one albums of 2026 (Australia)
