= List of number-one Australian Artist singles of 2026 (Australia) =

ARIA Charts number-one Australian Artist singles of 2026 < 2025

Other Australian number-one charts of 2026
- albums
- singles
- urban singles
- dance singles
- club tracks
- digital tracks
- streaming tracks

The ARIA Singles Chart ranks the best-performing singles in Australia. Its data, published by the Australian Recording Industry Association, is based collectively on the weekly streams and digital and physical sales of singles.

To be eligible to appear on the chart, the recording must be a single produced by an artist of Australian nationality and released in the last two years. Older tracks are placed on the On Replay Chart.

== Chart history ==
List of number-one singles
| Issue date | Song | Artist(s) | Ref. |
|---|---|---|---|
| 5 January | "Dracula" | Tame Impala | |
| 12 January | "Dracula" | Tame Impala | |
| 19 January | "Think About Us" | Sonny Fodera, D.O.D and Poppy Baskcomb | |
| 26 January | "Dracula" | Tame Impala | |
| 2 February | "Dancing2" | Keli Holiday | |
| 9 February | "Dracula" | Tame Impala | |
| 16 February | "Dracula" | Tame Impala | |
| 23 February | "Dracula" | Tame Impala | |
| 2 March | "Dracula" | Tame Impala | |
| 9 March | "Dracula" | Tame Impala | |
| 16 March | "Dracula" | Tame Impala | |
| 23 March | "Dracula" | Tame Impala | |
| 30 March | "Dracula" | Tame Impala | |
| 6 April | "Dracula" | Tame Impala | |
| 13 April | "Dracula" | Tame Impala | |

== On Replay Chart ==
List of number-one singles
| Issue date | Song | Artist(s) | Ref. |
|---|---|---|---|
| 5 January | "Don't Dream It's Over" | Crowded House | |
| 12 January | "Don't Dream It's Over" | Crowded House | |
| 19 January | "Don't Dream It's Over" | Crowded House | |
| 26 January | "Don't Dream It's Over" | Crowded House | |
| 2 February | "Don't Dream It's Over" | Crowded House | |
| 9 February | "Don't Dream It's Over" | Crowded House | |
| 16 February | "Riptide" | Vance Joy | |
| 23 February | "Riptide" | Vance Joy | |
| 2 March | "Riptide" | Vance Joy | |
| 9 March | "Riptide" | Vance Joy | |
| 16 March | "Riptide" | Vance Joy | |
| 23 March | "Riptide" | Vance Joy | |
| 30 March | "Riptide" | Vance Joy | |
| 6 April | "Riptide" | Vance Joy | |
| 13 April | "Riptide" | Vance Joy | |

== Number-one artists ==
List of number-one artists, with total weeks spent at number one shown - charts combined
| Position | Artist | Weeks at No. 1 |
|---|---|---|
| 1 | Tame Impala | 13 |
| 2 | Vance Joy | 9 |
| 3 | Crowded House | 6 |
| 4 | Keli Holiday | 1 |
| 4 | Sonny Fodera | 1 |

== See also ==
- 2026 in music
