= List of number-one country albums of 2025 (Australia) =

ARIA Charts number-one country albums of 2025 < 2024 2026 >

Other Australian number-one charts of 2025
- albums
- singles
- urban singles
- dance singles
- club tracks
- digital tracks
- streaming tracks

Top Australian singles and albums of 2025
- top 25 singles
- top 25 albums

These are the Australian Country number-one albums of 2025, per the ARIA Charts.

== Chart history ==
Issue date	Album	Artist
6 January	One Thing at a Time	Morgan Wallen
13 January	One Thing at a Time	Morgan Wallen
20 January	This One's for You	Luke Combs
27 January	This One's for You	Luke Combs
3 February	This One's for You	Luke Combs
10 February	This One's for You	Luke Combs
17 February	This One's for You	Luke Combs
24 February	This One's for You	Luke Combs
3 March	This One's for You	Luke Combs
10 March	This One's for You	Luke Combs
17 March	This One's for You	Luke Combs
24 March	This One's for You	Luke Combs
31 March	This One's for You	Luke Combs
7 April	This One's for You	Luke Combs
14 April	This One's for You	Luke Combs
21 April	This One's for You	Luke Combs
28 April	One Thing at a Time	Morgan Wallen
5 May	One Thing at a Time	Morgan Wallen
12 May	One Thing at a Time	Morgan Wallen
19 May	One Thing at a Time	Morgan Wallen
26 May	I'm the Problem	Morgan Wallen
2 June	I'm the Problem	Morgan Wallen
9 June	I'm the Problem	Morgan Wallen
16 June	I'm the Problem	Morgan Wallen
23 June	I'm the Problem	Morgan Wallen
30 June	I'm the Problem	Morgan Wallen
7 July	I'm the Problem	Morgan Wallen
14 July	I'm the Problem	Morgan Wallen
21 July	I'm the Problem	Morgan Wallen
28 July	I'm the Problem	Morgan Wallen
4 August	I'm the Problem	Morgan Wallen
11 August	I'm the Problem	Morgan Wallen
18 August	I'm the Problem	Morgan Wallen
25 August	I'm the Problem	Morgan Wallen
1 September	Whirlwind	Lainey Wilson
8 September	I'm The Problem	Morgan Wallen
15 September	I'm The Problem	Morgan Wallen
22 September	I'm The Problem	Morgan Wallen
29 September	I'm The Problem	Morgan Wallen
6 October	Endemic Intelligence in Multiple Dimensions	Brad Cox
13 October	I'm The Problem	Morgan Wallen
20 October	I'm The Problem	Morgan Wallen
27 October	I'm The Problem	Morgan Wallen
3 November	Where You'll Find Me	James Johnson
10 November	I'm the Problem	Morgan Wallen
17 November	I'm the Problem	Morgan Wallen
24 November	I'm the Problem	Morgan Wallen
1 December	I'm the Problem	Morgan Wallen
8 December	I'm the Problem	Morgan Wallen
15 December	I'm the Problem	Morgan Wallen
22 December	I'm the Problem	Morgan Wallen
29 December	I'm the Problem	Morgan Wallen

== See also ==
- 2025 in music
- List of number-one albums of 2025 (Australia)
