= List of number-one urban albums of 2025 (Australia) =

ARIA Charts number-one urban albums of 2025 < 2024 2026 >

Other Australian number-one charts of 2025
- albums
- singles
- urban singles
- dance singles
- club tracks
- digital tracks
- streaming tracks

Top Australian singles and albums of 2025
- top 25 singles
- top 25 albums

The ARIA Hip Hop/R&B Albums Chart is a weekly chart that ranks the best-performing hip hop and R&B albums in Australia. It is published by the Australian Recording Industry Association (ARIA), an organisation that collects music data for the weekly ARIA Charts. To be eligible to appear on the chart, the recording must be an album of a predominantly urban nature.

== Chart history ==
Issue date	Album	Artist(s)	Reference
6 January	SOS	SZA	
13 January	SOS	SZA	
20 January	SOS	SZA	
27 January	SOS	SZA	
3 February	Can't Rush Greatness	Central Cee	
10 February	SOS	SZA	
17 February	GNX	Kendrick Lamar	
24 February	Some Sexy Songs 4 U	PartyNextDoor and Drake	
3 March	SOS	SZA	
10 March	SOS	SZA	
17 March	SOS	SZA	
24 March	Music	Playboi Carti	
31 March	SOS	SZA	
7 April	SOS	SZA	
14 April	SOS	SZA	
21 April	The Moon (The Light Side)	Bliss n Eso	
28 April	SOS	SZA	
5 May	SOS	SZA	
12 May	SOS	SZA	
19 May	SOS	SZA	
26 May	SOS	SZA	
2 June	Greatest Hits	Pitbull	
9 June	Greatest Hits	Pitbull	
16 June	Greatest Hits	Pitbull	
23 June	Look at Me Now	Onefour	
30 June	Greatest Hits	Pitbull	
7 July	Greatest Hits	Pitbull	
14 July	Greatest Hits	Pitbull	
21 July	Jack Boys 2	JackBoys and Travis Scott	
28 July	Don't Tap the Glass	Tyler, the Creator	
4 August	Don't Tap the Glass	Tyler, the Creator	
11 August	Fall From the Light	Hilltop Hoods	
18 August	Don't Tap the Glass	Tyler, the Creator	
25 August	Greatest Hits	Pitbull	
1 September	Cherry Bomb	Tyler, the Creator	
8 September	Chromakopia	Tyler, the Creator	
15 September	Don't Tap the Glass	Tyler, the Creator	
22 September	Don't Tap the Glass	Tyler, the Creator	
29 September	Am I the Drama?	Cardi B	
6 October	The Moon (The Dark Side)	Bliss n Eso	
13 October	Vie	Doja Cat	
20 October	Djandjay	Baker Boy	
27 October	Drinking from the Sun	Hilltop Hoods	
3 November	The Boy Who Played the Harp	Dave	
10 November	Chromakopia	Tyler, the Creator	
17 November	Chromakopia	Tyler, the Creator	
24 November	Chromakopia	Tyler, the Creator	
1 December	Chromakopia	Tyler, the Creator	
8 December	Chromakopia	Tyler, the Creator	
15 December	GNX	Kendrick Lamar	
22 December	Chromakopia	Tyler, the Creator	
29 December	Chromakopia	Tyler, the Creator	

== See also ==
- 2025 in music
- List of number-one albums of 2025 (Australia)
