= List of number-one singles in Australia =

List on music in Australia

This is a list of number-one singles in Australia from the Kent Music Report era to its current ARIA Charts.

== 1940s–1990s ==
- 1940s || 1950s || 1960s || 1970s || 1980s || 1990s

== 2000s ==
- 2000 || 2001 || 2002 || 2003 || 2004 || 2005 || 2006 || 2007 || 2008 || 2009

== 2010s ==
- 2010 || 2011 || 2012 || 2013 || 2014 || 2015 || 2016 || 2017 || 2018 || 2019

== 2020s ==
- 2020 || 2021 || 2022 || 2023 || 2024 || 2025 || 2026

== See also ==
- List of number-one albums in Australia
