= List of number-one albums in Australia =

This is a list of number-one albums in Australia from the Kent Music Report to the current ARIA Charts.

== 1960s ==
- 1965 || 1966 || 1967 || 1968 || 1969

== 1970s ==
- 1970 || 1971 || 1972 || 1973 || 1974 || 1975 || 1976 || 1977 || 1978 || 1979

== 1980s ==
- 1980 || 1981 || 1982 || 1983 || 1984 || 1985 || 1986 || 1987 || 1988 || 1989

== 1990s ==
- 1990 || 1991 || 1992 || 1993 || 1994 || 1995 || 1996 || 1997 || 1998 || 1999

== 2000s ==
- 2000 || 2001 || 2002 || 2003 || 2004 || 2005 || 2006 || 2007 || 2008 || 2009

== 2010s ==
- 2010 || 2011 || 2012 || 2013 || 2014 || 2015 || 2016 || 2017 || 2018 || 2019

== 2020s ==
- 2020 || 2021 || 2022 || 2023 || 2024 || 2025 || 2026

== See also ==
- List of number-one singles in Australia
