= Fallow (Fanny Lumsden album) =

Studio album by Fanny Lumsden
- Released: 13 March 2020
- Length: 40:15
- Label: Cooking Vinyl Australia

Fanny Lumsden chronology
Real Class Act (2017)	Fallow (2020)	Hey Dawn (2023)

Fallow is the third studio album by Australian country music singer, Fanny Lumsden. It was released in March 2020 and peaked at number 10 on the ARIA Charts.

At the ARIA Music Awards of 2020, the album won the ARIA Award for Best Country Album.

At the AIR Awards of 2021, the album won Best Independent Country Album or EP.

== Background and recording ==
Lumsden said, "I went into the record to make songs that were also a little more hopeful, because I'd talked about drought for so long and everyone in the music industry and my family are still going through it. It's not that I didn't want to acknowledge it, I just knew that the people going through it didn't want reminding. They know and they want an escape. I wanted to write about green grass, running water, mountains and sunsets. I was experiencing those things and it was giving me such joy. I wanted that glorious buzz in my songs."

== Reception ==
Professional ratings
Review scores
Source	Rating
The Music	4/5 stars

Liz Giuffre from The Music said "Fanny Lumsden's work covers the best of contemporary country music – acoustic story bases that reward close listening to the lyric sheets. It's rude to give away too much in a review, but let's just say she has a gift for matching the familiar with the unexpected in a chorus."

== Track listing ==
- All songs written by Edwina Lumsden
1. "Mountain Song" - 1:56
2. "This Too Shall Pass" - 3:20
3. "Peed in the Pool" - 3:41
4. "Grown Ups" - 3:27
5. "Fierce" - 2:38
6. "Tidy Town" - 4:26
7. "Fallow" - 4:39
8. "Wishing" - 2:34
9. "These Days" - 3:44
10. "Dig" - 3:24
11. "Black and White" - 3:57
12. "Mountain Song" (Reprise) - 2:29

== Charts ==
=== Weekly chart ===
Weekly chart performance for Fallow
Chart (2020)	Peak position
Australian Albums (ARIA)	10

=== Year-end chart ===
Year-end chart performance for Fallow
Chart (2020)	Position
Australian Country Albums (ARIA)	93
