= Hey Dawn =

Studio album by Fanny Lumsden
- Released: 4 August 2023
- Length: 37:19
- Label: Cooking Vinyl Australia

Fanny Lumsden chronology
Fallow (2020)	Hey Dawn (2023)	Traditions (2026)

Hey Dawn is the fourth studio album by Australian country music singer, Fanny Lumsden. The album was announced in April 2023 and released on 4 August 2023. In a statement upon announcement, Lumsden said, "I was a bit stuck after Fallow and didn't know where to go, and that unlocked it: 'Oh, you just need to wake up, it's a new day, it's a new moment, every day is a new moment, and you just need to be where you are right now. Forget about Fallow, forget about all the other things, just be now.'" Lumsden added, "I wanted it to feel good, I wanted to have fun, I didn't want to think too hard about it – I just wanted to feel."

At the 2023 ARIA Music Awards, the album won Best Country Album.

At the 2024 Country Music Awards of Australia, the album won Alt-Country Album of the Year.

At the AIR Awards of 2024, the album was nominated for Best Independent Country Album or EP.

== Critical reception ==
Professional ratings
Review scores
Source	Rating
Rolling Stone Australia	4/5 stars

Zanda Wilson from Rolling Stone Australia said "It's immediately obvious that Hey Dawn has its own unique, different personality. Songs like 'You'll Be Fine' demonstrate this exciting new trajectory, clearly crossing into pop-country territory, with melodic and rhythmic tropes that could easily see the track transition to more mainstream pop playlists.[…] 'Millionaire' then goes and treads more of a country-rock path, with heavier instrumentation including distorted guitar in parts. 'Great Divide' and 'When I Die' are classic upbeat-country affairs; twangy timbre, countermelodies, and call-and-response vocals. And then there are the ballads that Lumsden is so well known for."

Brydget Chrisfield from Beat Magazine called the album an "absolute swoon-fest".

== Track listing ==
All songs written by Edwina Lumsden, except where noted.

1. "Hey Dawn" – 2:08
2. "Great Divide" – 4:25
3. "You'll Be Fine" – 2:39
4. "Ugly Flowers" – 4:58
5. "When I Die" (Lumsden, Benjamin Corbett) – 4:17
6. "Lucky" (Lumsden, Matthew Fell) – 3:15
7. "Soar" (Lumsden, Corbett, Fell) – 4:43
8. "Millionaire" (Lumsden, Corbett, Fell, Dan Freeman) – 3:49
9. "Enjoy the Ride" – 3:56
10. "Stories" – 3:09

== Charts ==
=== Weekly charts ===
Weekly chart performance for Hey Dawn
Chart (2023)	Peak position
Australian Albums (ARIA)	10

=== Year-end chart ===
Year-end chart performance for Hey Dawn
Chart (2023)	Position
Australian Country Albums (ARIA)	44
