= Traditions (Fanny Lumsden album) =

Studio album by Fanny Lumsden
- Released: 30 October 2026
- Length: 40:07
- Label: Red Dirt Records
- Producer: Steven Schram

Fanny Lumsden chronology
Hey Dawn (2023)	Traditions (2026)

Traditions is the fifth studio album by Australian country music singer, Fanny Lumsden. The album was announced in August 2026 and released on 30 October 2026. The album debuted at number 6 on the ARIA Charts; her highest charting album to date.

The album was recorded live in the studio over nine days alongside her band, The Daddies. Upon announcement, Lumsden explained the title "As I've got older, I've begun to realise the value and meaning that can come from traditions; however, what I'm still learning is how to balance the ideas of who I am with those traditions and that they are all allowed to change as we go."

The album was launched on 31 October 2026 at a concert in Tooma, New South Wales, followed by dates across Victoria and NSW in November 2026.

== Critical reception ==
In the week of release, it was ABC Country's "feature album" with Courtney Fry saying, "Traditions is a collection of songs that recognise the rituals and lore of family and growing up."

Brydget Chrisfield from Beat Magazine said "The record asks how heritage shapes who you are, and Lumsden answers in close-up: heat haze, shadows falling on red gums, kids running amok with wet hair and food down their shirts". Chrisfield named "By the River" as the highlight.

James Daykin from Entertainment Focus said "Traditions is warm without being sentimental, reflective without becoming heavy and ambitious without losing its connection to the earth beneath its feet. It is the sound of an artist taking stock of the life she has built, recognising its imperfections and deciding that she wants to keep living it on her own terms."

== Track listing ==
1. "Prelude" – 0:15
2. "Traditions" – 3:37
3. "Mother's Eyes" – 4:11
4. "Chest First" – 3:17
5. "Salt of the Earth" – 4:14
6. "God or the Stars" – 4:06
7. "By the River" (featuring Paul Kelly) – 3:03
8. "Car Crash" – 4:04
9. "Summer Mountain Moon" – 4:01
10. "Sweet Hurt" – 3:19
11. "Monsters and Magpies" – 3:34
12. "Difficult Woman" – 2:21

== Charts ==
Chart performance for Traditions
Chart (2026)	Peak position
Australian Albums (ARIA)	6
Australian Country Albums (ARIA)	1

== See also ==
- List of number-one country albums of 2026 (Australia)
