= Real Class Act =

Studio album by Fanny Lumsden
- Released: 22 September 2017
- Length: 45:37
- Label: Red Dirt Road Records
- Producer: Matt Fell

Fanny Lumsden chronology
Small Town Big Shot (2015)	Real Class Act (2017)	Fallow (2020)

Real Class Act is the second studio album by Australian country music singer, Fanny Lumsden. It was released in September 2017 and peaked at number 23 on the ARIA Charts. Lumsden promoted the album with an Australian tour, lasting from September 2017 to March 2018.

At the AIR Awards of 2018, the album won Best Country Album. At the ARIA Music Awards of 2018, the album was nominated for Best Country Album.

== Reception ==
Tiffany Mitchell from Blank Gold Coast said "There is a definite likeness, personality and song savviness similar to US country twinkle star Kacey Musgraves. Lumsden confidently creates MGM grand musical numbers of little town observations. This is what we need in Australian country music right now; original instrumental intros and vibrant music production swirling with clever lyrics that are too good to throw away."

== Track listing ==
1. "Watershed" - 3:53
2. "Roll On - 2:57
3. "Real Class Act" - 3:53
4. "Elastic Waistband" - 3:22
5. "Big Ol' Dry" - 4:06
6. "Real Men Don't Cry (War on Pride)" - 4:07
7. "Pretty Little Fools" - 2:58
8. "Peppercorn Tree" - 3:26
9. "Shootin' the Breeze" - 3:41
10. "Perfect Mess" - 4:50
11. "Rain on Your Parade" - 4:39
12. "Here to Hear" - 3:45

== Charts ==
Chart (2017)	Peak position
Australian Albums (ARIA)	23
