= Fanny Lumsden =

Australian country music singer

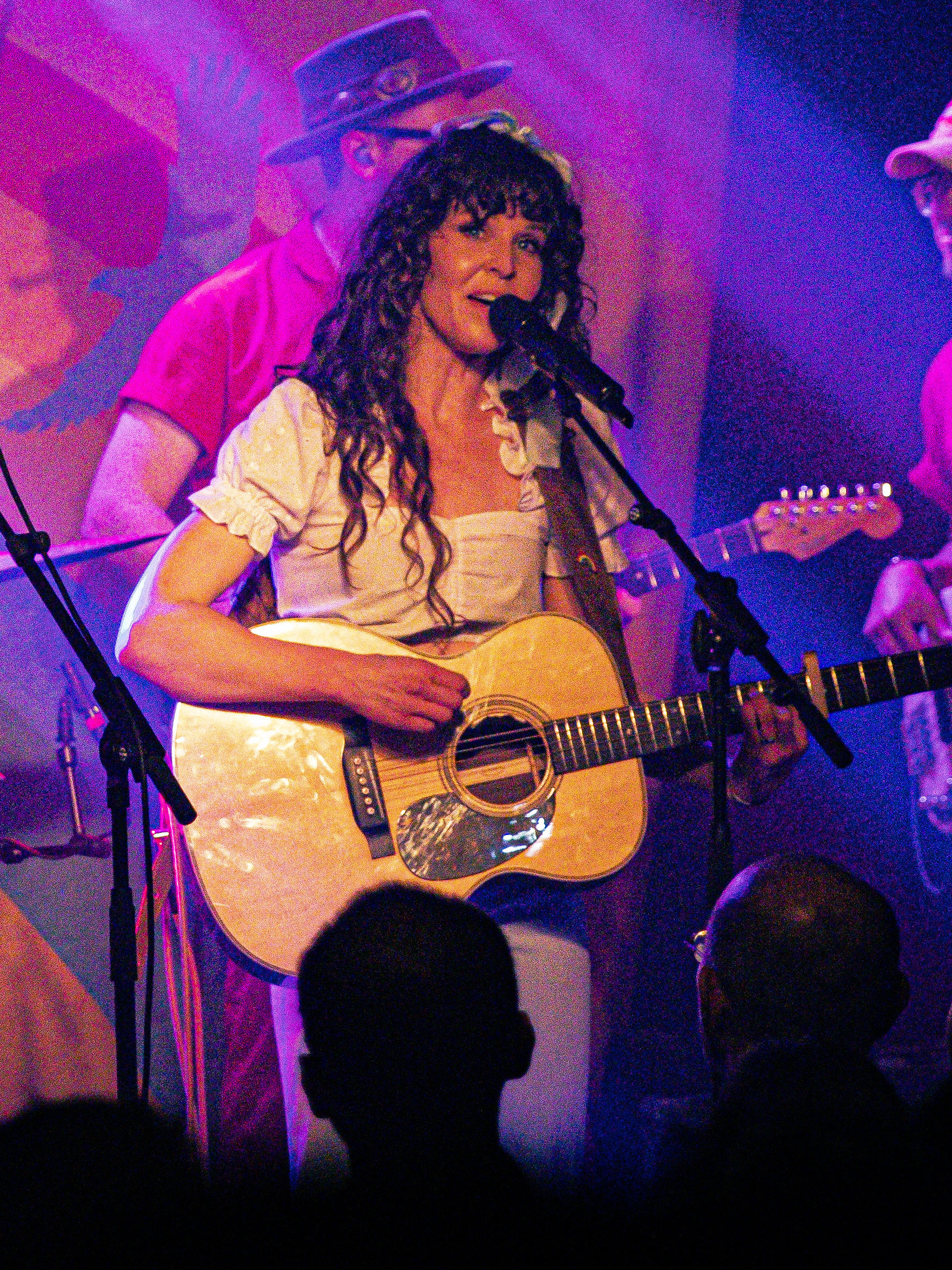

Background information
- Born: Edwina Margaret Lumsden; 18 December 1986 (age 39); New South Wales, Australia
- Genre: Country
- Years active: 2011-present
- Spouse: Dan Freeman (m. 2016)
- Website: www.fannylumsden.net

Edwina Margaret Lumsden, (born 18 December 1986) professionally known as Fanny Lumsden, is an Australian country music singer and songwriter. She has released 5 albums and 3 EPs.

== Biography ==
Lumsden was born in Tallimba, a tiny town in central New South Wales, Australia, 600 kilometers from the nearest city. She grew up on a wool farm and studied rural science at the University of New England in Armidale.

=== Career ===
In August 2012, Fanny Lumsden and the Thrillseekers released Autumn Lawn EP proceeded by the single "Firing Line".

Lumsden's debut album, Small Town Big Shot, was released in September 2015 and nominated for the ARIA Award for Best Country Album at the ARIA Music Awards of 2016. The album produced two singles, "Soapbox" and "Land of Gold". Lumsden also won the CMC New OZ Music artist of the Year award.

In 2017, Lumsden won her first Golden Guitar for New Talent of the Year. Later that year being nominated for another three Golden Guitars.

Her second album Real Class Act was released in September 2017. The album won Best Country Album at the AIR Awards of 2018 and was nominated for Best Country Album at the ARIA Music Awards of 2018.

On 13 March 2020, Lumsden released her third studio album titled Fallow. Fallow debuted at number 10 on the ARIA Charts. It won the ARIA Award for Best Country Album in 2020, 5 CMAA Golden Guitar Awards (including Album of the Year) in 2021 and the AIR Award for Best Country Album.

In April 2023, Lumsden announced the forthcoming release of Hey Dawn, released on 4 August 2023. In June 2023 Lumsden performed for the first time in the UK, at the Glastonbury festival.

In 2024, Lumsden performed a version of "Somebody That I Used to Know" on Spicks and Specks and began performing it at her shows to positive reactions. In June 2025, Lumsden released a recorded version.

In June 2026, Lumsden released the single "Difficult Woman", recorded live in one take with just Fanny and her acoustic guitar.

On 30 October 2026, Lumsden released her fifth studio album, Traditions, recorded in just nine days and released on her independent label, Red Dirt Road Records.

== Personal life ==
Lumsden commenced dating Dan Freeman in 2012. They were married in 2016 and have two sons.

== Discography ==
=== Studio albums ===
List of studio albums
Title	Album details	Peak chart positions
Title	Album details	AUS
Small Town Big Shot	Released: 18 September 2015 (Australia); Label: Fanny Lumsden; Formats: CD, digital download, streaming	—
Real Class Act	Released: 22 September 2017 (Australia); Label: Red Dirt Road; Formats: CD, digital download, streaming	23
Fallow	Released: 13 March 2020 (Australia); Label: Cooking Vinyl Australia; Formats: CD, digital download, streaming, vinyl	10
Hey Dawn	Released: 4 August 2023; Label: Cooking Vinyl Australia; Formats: CD, digital download, streaming, vinyl	10
Traditions	Released: 30 October 2026; Label: Red Dirt Road; Formats: CD, digital download, streaming, vinyl	6

=== EPs ===
List of EPs
Title	EP details
Autumn Lawn (Fanny Lumsden and the Thrillseekers)	Released: 28 August 2012; Label: MGM; Format: CD
Live at the Great	Released: 21 November 2021 (Australia); Label: Cooking Vinyl Australia; Format: digital

== Awards and nominations ==
=== AIR Awards ===
The Australian Independent Record Awards, commonly known informally as the AIR Awards, are annual awards to recognise, promote and celebrate the success of Australia's independent music sector. Lumsden has won one award.

Year	Nominee / work	Award	Result	Ref.
2018	Real Class Act	Best Country Album	Won	
2021	Fallow	Independent Album of the Year	Nominated	
2021	Fallow	Best Independent Country Album or EP	Won	
2024	Hey Dawn	Best Independent Country Album or EP	Won	

=== APRA Awards ===
The APRA Awards are held in Australia and New Zealand by the Australasian Performing Right Association to recognise songwriting skills, sales and airplay performance by its members annually.

Year	Nominee / work	Award	Result	Ref.
2022	"Dig"	Most Performed Country Song	Nominated	

=== ARIA Awards ===
The ARIA Music Awards is an annual awards ceremony that recognises excellence, innovation, and achievement across all genres of Australian music. Lumsden had been nominated for three ARIA Music Awards.

Year	Nominee / work	Award	Result	Ref.
2016	Small Town Big Shot	Best Country Album	Nominated	
2018	Real Class Act	Best Country Album	Nominated	
2020	Fallow	Best Country Album	Won	
2023	Hey Dawn	Best Country Album	Won	

=== Australian Music Prize ===
The Australian Music Prize (the AMP) is an annual award of $30,000 given to an Australian band or solo artist in recognition of the merit of an album released during the year of award. They commenced in 2005.

Year	Nominee / work	Award	Result	Ref.
2020	Fallow	Album of the Year	Nominated	

=== Australian Women in Music Awards ===
The Australian Women in Music Awards (AWMA) is an annual event that celebrates outstanding women in the Australian Music Industry who have made significant and lasting contributions in their chosen field. They commenced in 2018.

Year	Nominee / work	Award	Result	Ref.
2021	Fanny Lumsden	Live Production Touring Award	Nominated	

=== Country Music Awards (CMAA) ===
Fanny Lumsden has won seven Golden guitar awards at the Tamworth Country Music Awards of Australia.

Year	Nominee / work	Award	Result	Ref.
2017	"Land of Gold"	New Talent of the Year	Won	
2018	Real Class Act	Alt. Country Album of the Year	Nominated	
2018	herself	Female Artist of the Year	Nominated	
2018	"Roll On"	Heritage Song of the Year	Nominated	
2019	"Elastic Waistband"	Video Clip of the Year	Won	
2020	"Real Men Don't Cry (War on Pride)"	Video Clip of the Year	Won	
2021	Fallow	Country Album of the Year	Won	
2021	Fallow	Alt. Country Album of the Year	Won	
2021	herself for Fallow	Female Artist of the Year	Won	
2021	"Fierce"	Single of the Year	Won	
2021	"Mountain Song/This Too Shall Pass"	Video of the Year	Won	
2021	"Fierce"	APRA Song of the Year	Nominated	
2021	"These Days"	Heritage Song of the Year	Nominated	
2022	(unknown)	(unknown)	Nominated	
2024	"You'll be Fine" (directed by Anna Phillips)	Video of the Year	Nominated	
2024	Hey Dawn	Alt. Country Album of the Year	Won	
2024	"Ugly Flowers"	Heritage Song of the Year	Nominated	
2024	herself	Female Artist of the Year	Nominated	
2026	"Look At Me Now"	Music Video of the Year	Won	
2027	"Traditions"	Video of the Year	Pending	
2027	herself	Female Artist of the Year	Pending	

=== National Live Music Awards ===
The National Live Music Awards (NLMAs) are a broad recognition of Australia's diverse live industry, celebrating the success of the Australian live scene. The awards commenced in 2016.

Year	Nominee / work	Award	Result	Ref.
2017	Fanny Lumsden	Live Country or Folk Act of the Year	Nominated	
2018	Fanny Lumsden	Live Country or Folk Act of the Year	Nominated	

=== Tamworth Songwriters Awards ===
The Tamworth Songwriters Association (TSA) is an annual songwriting contest for original country songs, awarded in January at the Tamworth Country Music Festival. They commenced in 1986.

Year	Nominee / work	Award	Result (wins only)	Ref.
2019	"When Your Light Burns" by Chloe Styler and Fanny Lumsden	Alt Country Song of the Year	Won	
