= List of number-one dance singles of 2026 (Australia) =

ARIA Charts number-one dance singles of 2026 < 2025

Other Australian number-one charts of 2026
- albums
- singles
- urban singles
- club tracks
- digital tracks
- streaming tracks

The ARIA Dance Chart is a chart that ranks the best-performing dance singles of Australia. It is published by Australian Recording Industry Association (ARIA), an organisation who collect music data for the weekly ARIA Charts. To be eligible to appear on the chart, the recording must be a single, and be "predominantly of a dance nature, or with a featured track of a dance nature, or included in the ARIA Club Chart or a comparable overseas chart".

== Chart history ==
Date	Song	Artist(s)	Ref.
5 January	"No Broke Boys"	Disco Lines and Tinashe	
12 January	"No Broke Boys"	Disco Lines and Tinashe	
19 January	"No Broke Boys"	Disco Lines and Tinashe	
26 January	"No Broke Boys"	Disco Lines and Tinashe	
2 February	"No Broke Boys"	Disco Lines and Tinashe	
9 February	"No Broke Boys"	Disco Lines and Tinashe	
16 February	"No Broke Boys"	Disco Lines and Tinashe	
23 February	"No Broke Boys"	Disco Lines and Tinashe	
2 March	"No Broke Boys"	Disco Lines and Tinashe	
9 March	"No Broke Boys"	Disco Lines and Tinashe	
16 March	"No Broke Boys"	Disco Lines and Tinashe	
23 March	"No Broke Boys"	Disco Lines and Tinashe	
30 March	"No Broke Boys"	Disco Lines and Tinashe	
6 April	"No Broke Boys"	Disco Lines and Tinashe	
13 April	"No Broke Boys"	Disco Lines and Tinashe	
20 April	"No Broke Boys"	Disco Lines and Tinashe	
27 April	"No Broke Boys"	Disco Lines and Tinashe	
4 May	"No Broke Boys"	Disco Lines and Tinashe	
11 May	"No Broke Boys"	Disco Lines and Tinashe	
18 May	"No Broke Boys"	Disco Lines and Tinashe	
25 May	"No Broke Boys"	Disco Lines and Tinashe	
1 June	"No Broke Boys"	Disco Lines and Tinashe	
8 June	"No Broke Boys"	Disco Lines and Tinashe	
15 June	"No Broke Boys"	Disco Lines and Tinashe	
22 June	"No Broke Boys"	Disco Lines and Tinashe	
29 June	"No Broke Boys"	Disco Lines and Tinashe	
6 July	"No Broke Boys"	Disco Lines and Tinashe	
13 July	"No Broke Boys"	Disco Lines and Tinashe	
20 July	"No Broke Boys"	Disco Lines and Tinashe	
27 July	"No Broke Boys"	Disco Lines and Tinashe	
3 August	"No Broke Boys"	Disco Lines and Tinashe	
10 August	"No Broke Boys"	Disco Lines and Tinashe	
17 August	"No Broke Boys"	Disco Lines and Tinashe	
24 August	"No Broke Boys"	Disco Lines and Tinashe	
31 August	"No Broke Boys"	Disco Lines and Tinashe	
7 September	"No Broke Boys"	Disco Lines and Tinashe	
14 September	"No Broke Boys"	Disco Lines and Tinashe	
21 September	"No Broke Boys"	Disco Lines and Tinashe	
28 September	"No Broke Boys"	Disco Lines and Tinashe	
5 October	"Movin' to the Sun"	Hugel, Imael Angel and Ultra Naté	
12 October	"No Broke Boys"	Disco Lines and Tinashe	
19 October	"No Broke Boys"	Disco Lines and Tinashe	
26 October	"No Broke Boys"	Disco Lines and Tinashe	
2 November	"No Broke Boys"	Disco Lines and Tinashe	
9 November	"Movin' to the Sun"	Hugel, Imael Angel and Ultra Naté	
16 November	"Movin' to the Sun"	Hugel, Imael Angel and Ultra Naté	
23 November	"Movin' to the Sun"	Hugel, Imael Angel and Ultra Naté	

== See also ==
- 2026 in music
