= List of number-one dance singles of 2025 (Australia) =

ARIA Charts number-one dance singles of 2025 < 2024 2026 >

Other Australian number-one charts of 2025
- albums
- singles
- urban singles
- club tracks
- digital tracks
- streaming tracks

Top Australian singles and albums of 2025
- top 25 singles
- top 25 albums

The ARIA Dance Chart is a chart that ranks the best-performing dance singles of Australia. It is published by Australian Recording Industry Association (ARIA), an organisation who collect music data for the weekly ARIA Charts. To be eligible to appear on the chart, the recording must be a single, and be "predominantly of a dance nature, or with a featured track of a dance nature, or included in the ARIA Club Chart or a comparable overseas chart".

== Chart history ==
| Date | Song | Artist(s) | Ref. |
|---|---|---|---|
| 6 January | "Stumblin' In" | Cyril | |
| 13 January | "Kisses" | Bl3ss and CamrinWatsin featuring Bbyclose | |
| 20 January | "Kisses" | Bl3ss and CamrinWatsin featuring Bbyclose | |
| 27 January | "Kisses" | Bl3ss and CamrinWatsin featuring Bbyclose | |
| 3 February | "Somedays" | Sonny Fodera, Jazzy and D.O.D. | |
| 10 February | "Somedays" | Sonny Fodera, Jazzy and D.O.D. | |
| 17 February | "Dreamin" | Dom Dolla featuring Daya | |
| 24 February | "Dreamin" | Dom Dolla featuring Daya | |
| 3 March | "Somedays" | Sonny Fodera, Jazzy and D.O.D. | |
| 10 March | "Somedays" | Sonny Fodera, Jazzy and D.O.D. | |
| 17 March | "Somedays" | Sonny Fodera, Jazzy and D.O.D. | |
| 24 March | "Somedays" | Sonny Fodera, Jazzy and D.O.D. | |
| 31 March | "Somedays" | Sonny Fodera, Jazzy and D.O.D. | |
| 7 April | "Somedays" | Sonny Fodera, Jazzy and D.O.D. | |
| 14 April | "Somedays" | Sonny Fodera, Jazzy and D.O.D. | |
| 21 April | "Somedays" | Sonny Fodera, Jazzy and D.O.D. | |
| 28 April | "Somedays" | Sonny Fodera, Jazzy and D.O.D. | |
| 5 May | "Kisses" | Bl3ss and CamrinWatsin featuring Bbyclose | |
| 12 May | "Somedays" | Sonny Fodera, Jazzy and D.O.D. | |
| 19 May | "Kisses" | Bl3ss and CamrinWatsin featuring Bbyclose | |
| 26 May | "Kisses" | Bl3ss and CamrinWatsin featuring Bbyclose | |
| 2 June | "Kisses" | Bl3ss and CamrinWatsin featuring Bbyclose | |
| 9 June | "Kisses" | Bl3ss and CamrinWatsin featuring Bbyclose | |
| 16 June | "Kisses" | Bl3ss and CamrinWatsin featuring Bbyclose | |
| 23 June | "No Broke Boys" | Disco Lines and Tinashe | |
| 30 June | "Victory Lap" | Fred Again, PlaqueBoyMax and Skepta | |
| 7 July | "Victory Lap" | Fred Again, PlaqueBoyMax and Skepta | |
| 14 July | "Victory Lap" | Fred Again, PlaqueBoyMax and Skepta | |
| 21 July | "Victory Lap" | Fred Again, PlaqueBoyMax and Skepta | |
| 28 July | "Victory Lap" | Fred Again, PlaqueBoyMax and Skepta | |
| 4 August | "No Broke Boys" | Disco Lines and Tinashe | |
| 11 August | "No Broke Boys" | Disco Lines and Tinashe | |
| 18 August | "No Broke Boys" | Disco Lines and Tinashe | |
| 25 August | "No Broke Boys" | Disco Lines and Tinashe | |
| 1 September | "No Broke Boys" | Disco Lines and Tinashe | |
| 8 September | "No Broke Boys" | Disco Lines and Tinashe | |
| 15 September | "No Broke Boys" | Disco Lines and Tinashe | |
| 22 September | "No Broke Boys" | Disco Lines and Tinashe | |
| 29 September | "No Broke Boys" | Disco Lines and Tinashe | |
| 6 October | "No Broke Boys" | Disco Lines and Tinashe | |
| 13 October | "No Broke Boys" | Disco Lines and Tinashe | |
| 20 October | "No Broke Boys" | Disco Lines and Tinashe | |
| 27 October | "No Broke Boys" | Disco Lines and Tinashe | |
| 3 November | "No Broke Boys" | Disco Lines and Tinashe | |
| 10 November | "No Broke Boys" | Disco Lines and Tinashe | |
| 17 November | "No Broke Boys" | Disco Lines and Tinashe | |
| 24 November | "No Broke Boys" | Disco Lines and Tinashe | |
| 1 December | "No Broke Boys" | Disco Lines and Tinashe | |
| 8 December | "No Broke Boys" | Disco Lines and Tinashe | |
| 15 December | "No Broke Boys" | Disco Lines and Tinashe | |
| 22 December | "No Broke Boys" | Disco Lines and Tinashe | |
| 29 December | "No Broke Boys" | Disco Lines and Tinashe | |

== See also ==
- 2025 in music
