= List of number-one urban singles of 2025 (Australia) =

ARIA Charts number-one urban singles of 2025 < 2024 2026 >

Other Australian number-one charts of 2025
- albums
- singles
- dance singles
- club tracks
- digital tracks
- streaming tracks

Top Australian singles and albums of 2025
- top 25 singles
- top 25 albums

The ARIA Urban Chart is a chart that ranks the best-performing hip hop and R&B tracks of Australia. It is published by the Australian Recording Industry Association (ARIA), an organisation who collect music data for the weekly ARIA Charts. To be eligible to appear on the chart, the recording must be a single of a predominantly urban nature.

== Chart history ==
Issue date	Song	Artist(s)	Reference
6 January	"Luther"	Kendrick Lamar	
13 January	"Luther"	Kendrick Lamar	
20 January	"Luther"	Kendrick Lamar	
27 January	"Luther"	Kendrick Lamar	
3 February	"Luther"	Kendrick Lamar	
10 February	"Timeless"	The Weeknd and Playboi Carti	
17 February	"Not Like Us"	Kendrick Lamar	
24 February	"Not Like Us"	Kendrick Lamar	
3 March	"Luther"	Kendrick Lamar	
10 March	"Luther"	Kendrick Lamar	
17 March	"Luther"	Kendrick Lamar	
24 March	"Evil J0rdan"	Playboi Carti	
31 March	"Luther"	Kendrick Lamar	
7 April	"Nokia"	Drake	
14 April	"Nokia"	Drake	
21 April	"Nokia"	Drake	
28 April	"Nokia"	Drake	
5 May	"Nokia"	Drake	
12 May	"Love Me Or Not"	Ravyn Lenae	
19 May	"Love Me Or Not"	Ravyn Lenae	
26 May	"Love Me Or Not"	Ravyn Lenae	
2 June	"Love Me Or Not"	Ravyn Lenae	
9 June	"Love Me Or Not"	Ravyn Lenae	
16 June	"Love Me Or Not"	Ravyn Lenae	
23 June	"Love Me Or Not"	Ravyn Lenae	
30 June	"Love Me Or Not"	Ravyn Lenae	
7 July	"Love Me Or Not"	Ravyn Lenae	
14 July	"Love Me Or Not"	Ravyn Lenae	
21 July	"Love Me Or Not"	Ravyn Lenae	
28 July	"Love Me Or Not"	Ravyn Lenae	
4 August	"Love Me Or Not"	Ravyn Lenae	
11 August	"Love Me Or Not"	Ravyn Lenae	
18 August	"Love Me Or Not"	Ravyn Lenae	
25 August	"Love Me Or Not"	Ravyn Lenae	
1 September	"Love Me Or Not"	Ravyn Lenae	
8 September	"Love Me Or Not"	Ravyn Lenae	
15 September	"Love Me Or Not"	Ravyn Lenae	
22 September	"Love Me Or Not"	Ravyn Lenae	
29 September	"Love Me Or Not"	Ravyn Lenae	
6 October	"Love Me Or Not"	Ravyn Lenae	
13 October	"Love Me Or Not"	Ravyn Lenae	
20 October	"Love Me Or Not"	Ravyn Lenae	
27 October	"Love Me Or Not"	Ravyn Lenae	
3 November	"Love Me Or Not"	Ravyn Lenae	
10 November	"Love Me Or Not"	Ravyn Lenae	
17 November	"Love Me Or Not"	Ravyn Lenae	
24 November	"Where Is My Husband!"	Raye	
1 December	"Where Is My Husband!"	Raye	
8 December	"Where Is My Husband!"	Raye	
15 December	"Where Is My Husband!"	Raye	
22 December	"Where Is My Husband!"	Raye	
29 December	"Where Is My Husband!"	Raye	

== See also ==
- 2025 in music
- List of number-one singles of 2025 (Australia)
