= List of number-one club tracks of 2026 (Australia) =

ARIA Charts number-one club tracks of 2026 < 2025

Other Australian number-one charts of 2026
- albums
- singles
- urban singles
- dance singles
- digital tracks
- streaming tracks

This is the list of number-one tracks on the ARIA Club Chart in 2026, and is compiled by the Australian Recording Industry Association (ARIA) from weekly DJ reports.

== 2026 ==
Date	Song	Artist(s)	Reference
5 January	"Make It Happen"	Sgt Slick	
12 January	"Make It Happen"	Sgt Slick	
19 January	"Make It Happen"	Sgt Slick	
26 January	"Think About Us"	Sonny Fodera, D.O.D. and Poppy Baskcomb	
2 February	"All I Really Want" Original/Riva Starr Remix	Yes Boone	
9 February	"All I Really Want" Original/Riva Starr Remix	Yes Boone	
16 February	"All I Really Want" Original/Riva Starr Remix	Yes Boone	
23 February	"All I Really Want" Original/Riva Starr Remix	Yes Boone	
2 March	"Rain"	Fisher	
9 March	"Rain"	Fisher	
16 March	"Rain"	Fisher	
23 March	"Rain"	Fisher	
30 March	"Actin' Tough"	Dean Turnley	
6 April	"Actin' Tough"	Dean Turnley	
13 April	"Actin' Tough"	Dean Turnley	
20 April	"Actin' Tough"	Dean Turnley	
27 April	"Actin' Tough"	Dean Turnley	
4 May	"Actin' Tough"	Dean Turnley	
11 May	"Actin' Tough"	Dean Turnley	
18 May	"Actin' Tough"	Dean Turnley	
25 May	"Actin' Tough"	Dean Turnley	
1 June	"Actin' Tough"	Dean Turnley	
8 June	"Actin' Tough"	Dean Turnley	
15 June	"Actin' Tough"	Dean Turnley	
22 June	"Actin' Tough"	Dean Turnley	
29 June	"Actin' Tough"	Dean Turnley	
6 July	"The Bass Got Me Movin'"	Dr Packer vs. [Love] Tattoo	
13 July	"Chase the Sun"	Tom Budlin, Uninvited	
20 July	"Chase the Sun"	Tom Budlin, Uninvited	
27 July	"What a Life"	Fisher featuring Florence Arman	
3 August	"Chase the Sun"	Tom Budlin, Uninvited	
10 August	"Chase the Sun"	Tom Budlin, Uninvited	
17 August	"What a Life"	Fisher featuring Florence Arman	
24 August	"What a Life"	Fisher featuring Florence Arman	
31 August	"Day n Night"	Vassy and Bust-R	
7 September	"Day n Night"	Vassy and Bust-R	
14 September	"Day n Night"	Vassy and Bust-R	
21 September	"Day n Night"	Vassy and Bust-R	
28 September	"Tell Me"	Russell Small and Elektrik featuring Marina Davis	
5 October	"Tell Me"	Russell Small and Elektrik featuring Marina Davis	
12 October	"Tell Me"	Russell Small and Elektrik featuring Marina Davis	
19 October	"Danger Danger"	Dom Dolla, Solomun and Skepta	
26 October	"The Only Way Is Up"	James Alexandr and Zoe Badwi	
2 November	"Danger Danger"	Dom Dolla, Solomun and Skepta	
9 November	"Danger Danger"	Dom Dolla, Solomun and Skepta	
16 November	"Danger Danger"	Dom Dolla, Solomun and Skepta	
23 November	"Danger Danger"	Dom Dolla, Solomun and Skepta	

== Number-one artists ==
Position	Artist	Weeks at No. 1
1	Dean Turnley	14
2	Fisher	7
3	Dom Dolla	5
3	Solomun	5
3	Skepta	5
4	Yes Boone	4
4	Tom Budlin	4
4	Uninvited	4
4	Vassy	4
4	Bust-R	4
5	Sgt Slick	3
5	Florence Arman	3
5	Russell Small	3
5	Elektrik	3
5	Marina Davis (as featuring)	3
6	Sonny Fodera	1
6	D.O.D.	1
6	Poppy Baskcomb	1
6	Dr Packer	1
6	[Love] Tattoo	1
6	James Alexandr	1
6	Zoe Badwi	1

== See also ==
- 2026 in music
