= List of number-one urban singles of 2026 (Australia) =

ARIA Charts number-one urban singles of 2026 < 2025

Other Australian number-one charts of 2026
- albums
- singles
- dance singles
- club tracks
- digital tracks
- streaming tracks

The ARIA Urban Chart is a chart that ranks the best-performing hip hop and R&B tracks of Australia. It is published by the Australian Recording Industry Association (ARIA), an organisation who collect music data for the weekly ARIA Charts. To be eligible to appear on the chart, the recording must be a single of a predominantly urban nature.

== Chart history ==
Issue date	Song	Artist(s)	Reference
5 January	"Where Is My Husband!"	Raye	
12 January	"Where Is My Husband!"	Raye	
19 January	"Where Is My Husband!"	Raye	
26 January	"Where Is My Husband!"	Raye	
2 February	"Where Is My Husband!"	Raye	
9 February	"Where Is My Husband!"	Raye	
16 February	"Where Is My Husband!"	Raye	
23 February	"Where Is My Husband!"	Raye	
2 March	"Where Is My Husband!"	Raye	
9 March	"Where Is My Husband!"	Raye	
16 March	"Where Is My Husband!"	Raye	
23 March	"Raindance"	Dave and Tems	
30 March	"Raindance"	Dave and Tems	
6 April	"Raindance"	Dave and Tems	
13 April	"Raindance"	Dave and Tems	
20 April	"Where Is My Husband!"	Raye	
27 April	"Where Is My Husband!"	Raye	
4 May	"Raindance"	Dave and Tems	
11 May	"Raindance"	Dave and Tems	
18 May	"Raindance"	Dave and Tems	
25 May	"National Treasures"	Drake	
1 June	"Janice STFU"	Drake	
8 June	"Janice STFU"	Drake	
15 June	"Janice STFU"	Drake	
22 June	"Earrings"	Malcolm Todd	
29 June	"Earrings"	Malcolm Todd	
6 July	"Earrings"	Malcolm Todd	
13 July	"Earrings"	Malcolm Todd	
20 July	"Earrings"	Malcolm Todd	
27 July	"Earrings"	Malcolm Todd	
3 August	"Earrings"	Malcolm Todd	
10 August	"Earrings"	Malcolm Todd	
17 August	"Earrings"	Malcolm Todd	
24 August	"Earrings"	Malcolm Todd	
31 August	"Earrings"	Malcolm Todd	
7 September	"Earrings"	Malcolm Todd	
14 September	"Earrings"	Malcolm Todd	
21 September	"Earrings"	Malcolm Todd	
28 September	"Earrings"	Malcolm Todd	
5 October	"Earrings"	Malcolm Todd	
12 October	"Earrings"	Malcolm Todd	
19 October	"Earrings"	Malcolm Todd	
26 October	"Earrings"	Malcolm Todd	
2 November	"Earrings"	Malcolm Todd	
9 November	"Love Me Not"	Ravyn Lenae	
16 November	"Love Me Not"	Ravyn Lenae	
23 November	"Love Me Not"	Ravyn Lenae	

== See also ==
- 2026 in music
- List of number-one singles of 2026 (Australia)
