= List of number-one club tracks of 2025 (Australia) =

ARIA Charts number-one club tracks of 2025 < 2024 2026 >

Other Australian number-one charts of 2025
- albums
- singles
- urban singles
- dance singles
- digital tracks
- streaming tracks

Top Australian singles and albums of 2025
- top 25 singles
- top 25 albums

This is the list of number-one tracks on the ARIA Club Chart in 2025, and is compiled by the Australian Recording Industry Association (ARIA) from weekly DJ reports.

== 2025 ==
Date	Song	Artist(s)	Reference
6 January	"Dirty Cash"	Mind Electric	
13 January	"Dirty Cash"	Mind Electric	
20 January	"Dirty Cash"	Mind Electric	
27 January	"Dirty Cash"	Mind Electric	
3 February	"Dirty Cash"	Mind Electric	
10 February	"Falling"	Ben Renna	
17 February	"Playing With Knives" (Rubber people mix)	James Alexandr featuring Penelope	
24 February	"Playing With Knives" (Rubber people mix)	James Alexandr featuring Penelope	
3 March	"The Paddle"	Chusap and Ollie Hanson	
10 March	"Dreamin'"	Dom Dolla featuring Daya	
17 March	"Dreamin'"	Dom Dolla featuring Daya	
24 March	"Ease My Mind"	Chris Lake and Abel Balder	
31 March	"Stay"	Fisher	
7 April	"Stay"	Fisher	
14 April	"Stay"	Fisher	
21 April	"Stay"	Fisher	
28 April	"Stay"	Fisher	
5 May	"Stay"	Fisher	
12 May	"Stay"	Fisher	
19 May	"Stay"	Fisher	
26 May	"Loves Gonna Save Ya"	Piero	
2 June	"Stay"	Fisher	
9 June	"Ease My Mind"	Chris Lake and Abel Balder	
16 June	"Blessings"	Calvin Harris featuring Clementine Douglas	
23 June	"Blessings"	Calvin Harris featuring Clementine Douglas	
30 June	"Blessings"	Calvin Harris featuring Clementine Douglas	
7 July	"Blessings"	Calvin Harris featuring Clementine Douglas	
14 July	"Dare Me"	Holmes John	
21 July	"Dare Me"	Holmes John	
28 July	"Blackberries"	Fisher and bbyclose	
4 August	"Blackberries"	Fisher and bbyclose	
11 August	"Blackberries"	Fisher and bbyclose	
18 August	"Blackberries"	Fisher and bbyclose	
25 August	"Blackberries"	Fisher and bbyclose	
1 September	"Blackberries"	Fisher and bbyclose	
8 September	"Blackberries"	Fisher and bbyclose	
15 September	"Now Listen"	Yolanda Be Cool	
22 September	"Now Listen"	Yolanda Be Cool	
29 September	"Now Listen"	Yolanda Be Cool	
6 October	"Now Listen"	Yolanda Be Cool	
13 October	"Now Listen"	Yolanda Be Cool	
20 October	"Now Listen"	Yolanda Be Cool	
27 October	"Now Listen"	Yolanda Be Cool	
3 November	"Cry for You"	Sidepiece	
10 November	"Cry for You"	Sidepiece	
17 November	"Cry for You"	Sidepiece	
24 November	"Cry for You"	Sidepiece	
1 December	"Keep This Love Alive"	Frankie Romano and Oscar	
8 December	"Cry for You"	Sidepiece	
15 December	"Make It Happen"	Sgt Slick	
22 December	"Make It Happen"	Sgt Slick	
29 December	"Make It Happen"	Sgt Slick	

== Number-one artists ==
Position	Artist	Weeks at No. 1
1	Fisher	16
2	bbyclose	7
2	Yolanda Be Cool	7
3	Mind Electric	5
3	Sidepiece	5
4	Calvin Harris	4
4	Clementine Douglas (as featuring)	4
5	Sgt Slick	3
6	James Alexandr	2
6	Penelope (as featuring)	2
6	Dom Dolla	2
6	Daya (as featuring)	2
6	Chris Lake	2
6	Abel Balder	2
6	Holmes John	2
7	Ben Rena	1
7	Chusap	1
7	Ollie Hansonsap	1
7	Piero	1
7	Frankie Roma	1
7	Oscar	1

== See also ==
- 2025 in music
