= List of number-one singles of 2025 (Australia) =

ARIA Charts number-one singles of 2025 < 2024 2026 >

Other Australian number-one charts of 2025
- albums
- urban singles
- dance singles
- club tracks
- digital tracks
- streaming tracks

Top Australian singles and albums of 2025
- Triple J Hottest 100
- top 25 singles
- top 25 albums

The ARIA Singles Chart ranks the best-performing singles in Australia. Its data, published by the Australian Recording Industry Association, is based collectively on the weekly streams and digital and physical sales of singles.

Nine songs topped the chart in 2025, with "Ordinary" by Alex Warren spending the most weeks atop the chart at 17 weeks, and "APT." by Rosé and Bruno Mars achieving the first number one of the year, reclaiming the top spot after spending seven weeks at number one in 2024.

Five artists, Lola Young, Doechii, Alex Warren, Huntrix (Rei Ami, Ejae, Audrey Nuna) and Olivia Dean, reached the top for the first time. Kendrick Lamar achieved his first solo number one with "Not Like Us", having previously reached the top as a featured artist on Taylor Swift's "Bad Blood" in 2015.

== Chart history ==
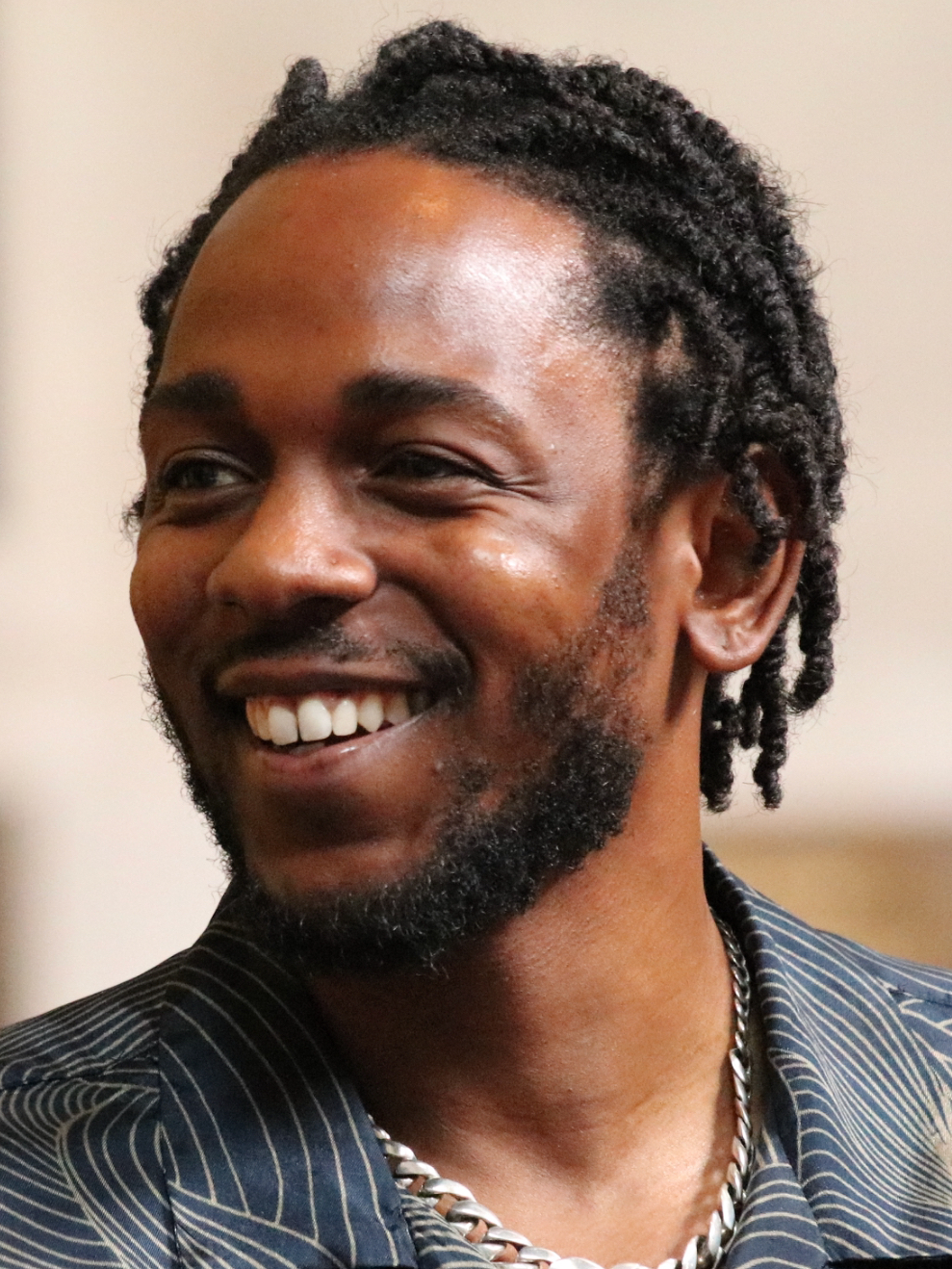
Kendrick Lamar achieved his first solo number one with "Not Like Us" after his Super Bowl performance, having previously reached the top as a featured artist on Taylor Swift's "Bad Blood" in 2015.

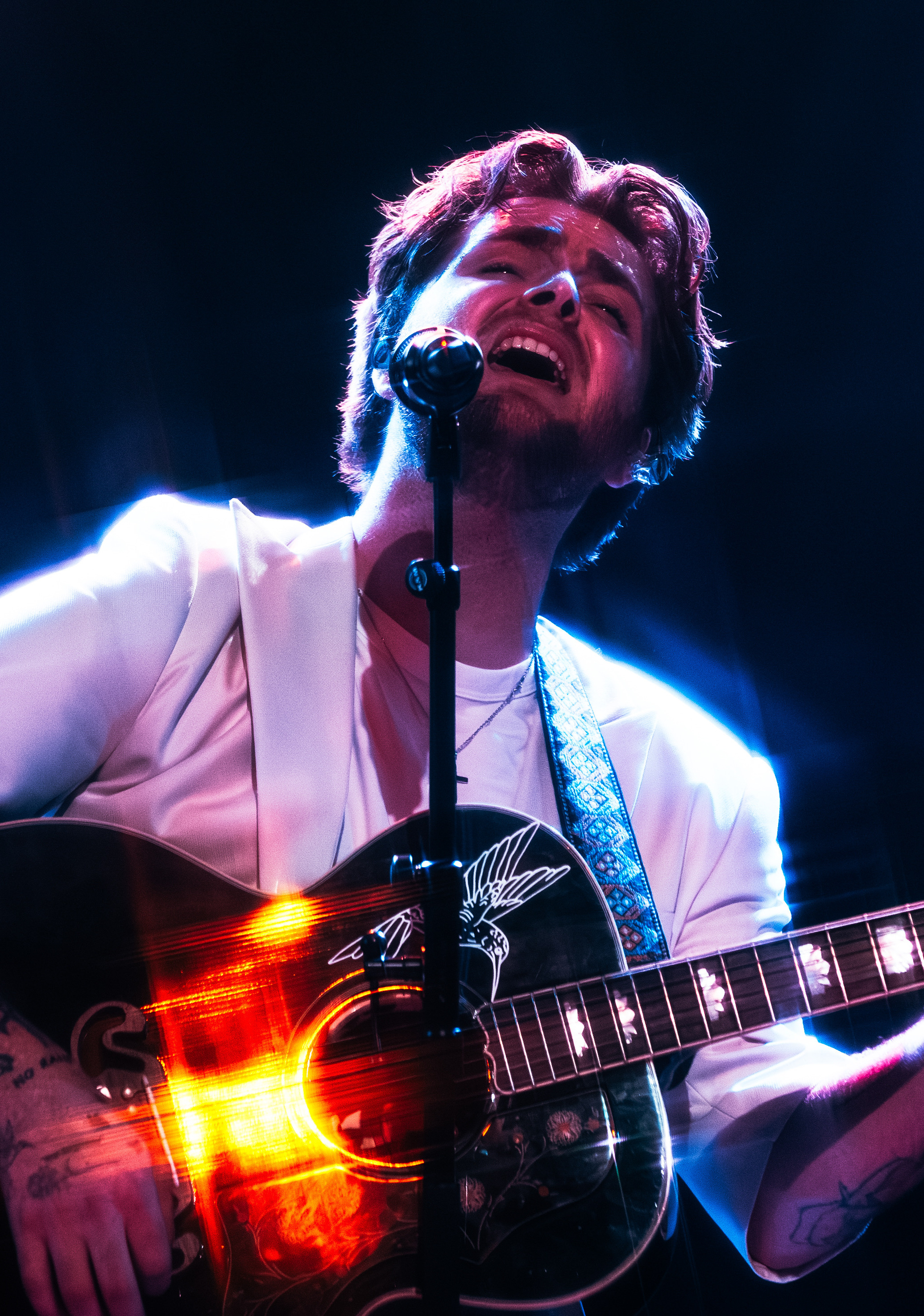
American singer-songwriter Alex Warren claimed the biggest song of 2025 in Australia with "Ordinary", which spent 17 weeks atop the chart. It became his first number one.

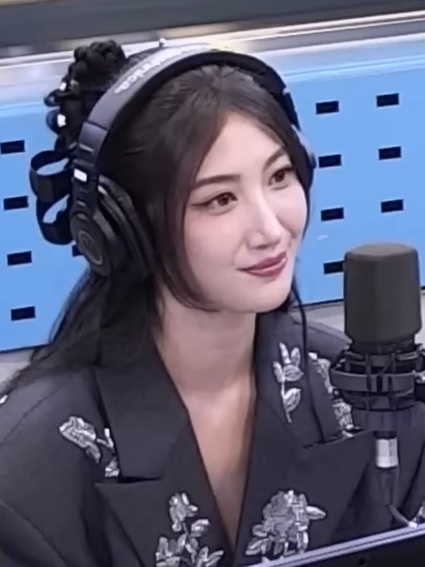
Fictional K-pop group Huntrix earned their first chart-topper with "Golden", which stayed atop for 10 consecutive weeks. The song became Ejae, Rei Ami and Audrey Nuna's first number one as members of the group.

List of number-one singles
Issue date	Song	Artist(s)	Ref.
6 January	"APT."	Rosé and Bruno Mars	
13 January	"APT."	Rosé and Bruno Mars	
20 January	"APT."	Rosé and Bruno Mars	
27 January	"APT."	Rosé and Bruno Mars	
3 February	"Messy"	Lola Young	
10 February	"Messy"	Lola Young	
17 February	"Not Like Us"	Kendrick Lamar	
24 February	"Not Like Us"	Kendrick Lamar	
3 March	"APT."	Rosé and Bruno Mars	
10 March	"APT."	Rosé and Bruno Mars	
17 March	"APT."	Rosé and Bruno Mars	
24 March	"Anxiety"	Doechii	
31 March	"Ordinary" †	Alex Warren	
7 April	"Ordinary" †	Alex Warren	
14 April	"Ordinary" †	Alex Warren	
21 April	"Ordinary" †	Alex Warren	
28 April	"Ordinary" †	Alex Warren	
5 May	"Ordinary" †	Alex Warren	
12 May	"Ordinary" †	Alex Warren	
19 May	"Ordinary" †	Alex Warren	
26 May	"Ordinary" †	Alex Warren	
2 June	"Ordinary" †	Alex Warren	
9 June	"Ordinary" †	Alex Warren	
16 June	"Ordinary" †	Alex Warren	
23 June	"Ordinary" †	Alex Warren	
30 June	"Ordinary" †	Alex Warren	
7 July	"Ordinary" †	Alex Warren	
14 July	"Ordinary" †	Alex Warren	
21 July	"Ordinary" †	Alex Warren	
28 July	"Daisies"	Justin Bieber	
4 August	"Golden"	Huntrix (Rei Ami, Ejae and Audrey Nuna)	
11 August	"Golden"	Huntrix (Rei Ami, Ejae and Audrey Nuna)	
18 August	"Golden"	Huntrix (Rei Ami, Ejae and Audrey Nuna)	
25 August	"Golden"	Huntrix (Rei Ami, Ejae and Audrey Nuna)	
1 September	"Golden"	Huntrix (Rei Ami, Ejae and Audrey Nuna)	
8 September	"Golden"	Huntrix (Rei Ami, Ejae and Audrey Nuna)	
15 September	"Golden"	Huntrix (Rei Ami, Ejae and Audrey Nuna)	
22 September	"Golden"	Huntrix (Rei Ami, Ejae and Audrey Nuna)	
29 September	"Golden"	Huntrix (Rei Ami, Ejae and Audrey Nuna)	
6 October	"Golden"	Huntrix (Rei Ami, Ejae and Audrey Nuna)	
13 October	"The Fate of Ophelia"	Taylor Swift	
20 October	"The Fate of Ophelia"	Taylor Swift	
27 October	"The Fate of Ophelia"	Taylor Swift	
3 November	"The Fate of Ophelia"	Taylor Swift	
10 November	"The Fate of Ophelia"	Taylor Swift	
17 November	"The Fate of Ophelia"	Taylor Swift	
24 November	"Man I Need"	Olivia Dean	
1 December	"Man I Need"	Olivia Dean	
8 December	"Man I Need"	Olivia Dean	
15 December	"Man I Need"	Olivia Dean	
22 December	"Man I Need"	Olivia Dean	
29 December	"Man I Need"	Olivia Dean	

== Number-one artists ==
List of number-one artists, with total weeks spent at number one shown
Position	Artist	Weeks at No. 1
1	Alex Warren	17
2	Huntrix (Rei Ami, Ejae and Audrey Nuna)	10
3	Rosé	7
3	Bruno Mars	7
4	Taylor Swift	6
4	Olivia Dean	6
5	Lola Young	2
5	Kendrick Lamar	2
6	Doechii	1
6	Justin Bieber	1

== See also ==
- 2025 in music
- List of number-one albums of 2025 (Australia)
