= List of number-one albums of 2025 (Australia) =

ARIA Charts number-one albums of 2025 < 2024 2026 >

Other Australian number-one charts of 2025
- singles
- urban singles
- dance singles
- club tracks
- digital tracks
- streaming tracks

Top Australian singles and albums of 2025
- Triple J Hottest 100
- top 25 singles
- top 25 albums

The ARIA Albums Chart ranks the best-performing albums and extended plays (EPs) in Australia. Its data, published by the Australian Recording Industry Association, is based collectively on the weekly physical and digital sales and streams of albums and EPs.

In 2025, 27 albums claimed the top spot, with the KPop Demon Hunters soundtrack spending the most weeks atop the chart, with nine. The first number one of the year, Short n' Sweet by Sabrina Carpenter, carried over from the end of 2024 after spending seven weeks at the top the previous year. Both Carpenter and Taylor Swift spent seven weeks atop the chart in 2025, the equal-most among all individual artists.

Ten artists, Teddy Swims, Tate McRae, Playboi Carti, Ball Park Music, Ghost, Sleep Token, Calum Hood, Benson Boone, Olivia Dean and Cynthia Erivo, achieved their first number-one album.

== Chart history ==
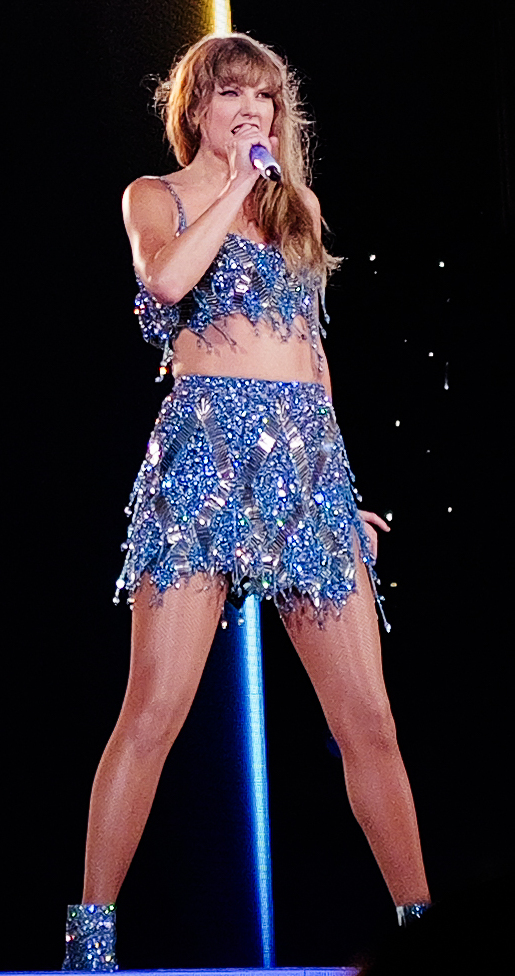
Taylor Swift's The Life of a Showgirl was the longest running and best selling album of the year.

Key
†	Indicates best-performing album of 2025

List of number-one albums
Date	Album	Artist(s)	Ref.
6 January	Short n' Sweet	Sabrina Carpenter	
13 January	Short n' Sweet	Sabrina Carpenter	
20 January	Short n' Sweet	Sabrina Carpenter	
27 January	The Secret of Us	Gracie Abrams	
3 February	I've Tried Everything but Therapy (Part 2)	Teddy Swims	
10 February	Hurry Up Tomorrow	The Weeknd	
17 February	GNX	Kendrick Lamar	
24 February	Short n' Sweet	Sabrina Carpenter	
3 March	So Close to What	Tate McRae	
10 March	Hit Me Hard and Soft	Billie Eilish	
17 March	Mayhem	Lady Gaga	
24 March	Music	Playboi Carti	
31 March	Short n' Sweet	Sabrina Carpenter	
7 April	Eternal Sunshine	Ariana Grande	
14 April	Like Love	Ball Park Music	
21 April	The Moon (The Light Side)	Bliss n Eso	
28 April	Short n' Sweet	Sabrina Carpenter	
5 May	Skeletá	Ghost	
12 May	The Secret of Us	Gracie Abrams	
19 May	Even in Arcadia	Sleep Token	
26 May	I'm the Problem	Morgan Wallen	
2 June	I'm the Problem	Morgan Wallen	
9 June	I'm the Problem	Morgan Wallen	
16 June	Defiant	Jimmy Barnes	
23 June	Order Chaos Order	Calum Hood	
30 June	American Heart	Benson Boone	
7 July	Virgin	Lorde	
14 July	KPop Demon Hunters (Soundtrack from the Netflix Film)	Various artists	
21 July	KPop Demon Hunters (Soundtrack from the Netflix Film)	Various artists	
28 July	KPop Demon Hunters (Soundtrack from the Netflix Film)	Various artists	
4 August	KPop Demon Hunters (Soundtrack from the Netflix Film)	Various artists	
11 August	Fall from the Light	Hilltop Hoods	
18 August	KPop Demon Hunters (Soundtrack from the Netflix Film)	Various artists	
25 August	KPop Demon Hunters (Soundtrack from the Netflix Film)	Various artists	
1 September	KPop Demon Hunters (Soundtrack from the Netflix Film)	Various artists	
8 September	Man's Best Friend	Sabrina Carpenter	
15 September	KPop Demon Hunters (Soundtrack from the Netflix Film)	Various artists	
22 September	Play	Ed Sheeran	
29 September	KPop Demon Hunters (Soundtrack from the Netflix Film)	Various artists	
6 October	The Art of Loving	Olivia Dean	
13 October	The Life of a Showgirl †	Taylor Swift	
20 October	The Life of a Showgirl †	Taylor Swift	
27 October	The Life of a Showgirl †	Taylor Swift	
3 November	The Life of a Showgirl †	Taylor Swift	
10 November	The Life of a Showgirl †	Taylor Swift	
17 November	The Life of a Showgirl †	Taylor Swift	
24 November	Everyone's a Star!	5 Seconds of Summer	
1 December	Wicked: For Good – The Soundtrack	Wicked Movie Cast, Cynthia Erivo and Ariana Grande	
8 December	The Life of a Showgirl †	Taylor Swift	
15 December	The Art of Loving	Olivia Dean	
22 December	The Art of Loving	Olivia Dean	
29 December	The Art of Loving	Olivia Dean	

== Number-one artists ==
List of number-one artists, with total weeks spent at number one shown
Position	Artist	Weeks at No. 1
1	Sabrina Carpenter	7
1	Taylor Swift	7
2	Olivia Dean	4
3	Morgan Wallen	3
4	Gracie Abrams	2
4	Ariana Grande	2
5	Teddy Swims	1
5	The Weeknd	1
5	Kendrick Lamar	1
5	Tate McRae	1
5	Billie Eilish	1
5	Lady Gaga	1
5	Playboi Carti	1
5	Ball Park Music	1
5	Bliss n Eso	1
5	Ghost	1
5	Sleep Token	1
5	Jimmy Barnes	1
5	Calum Hood	1
5	Benson Boone	1
5	Lorde	1
5	Hilltop Hoods	1
5	Ed Sheeran	1
5	5 Seconds of Summer	1
5	Cynthia Erivo	1

== See also ==
- 2025 in music
- List of number-one singles of 2025 (Australia)
