= List of number-one albums of 2026 (Australia) =

ARIA Charts number-one albums of 2026 < 2025

Other Australian number-one charts of 2026
- singles
- urban singles
- dance singles
- club tracks
- digital tracks
- streaming tracks

The ARIA Albums Chart ranks the best-performing albums and extended plays (EPs) in Australia. Its data, published by the Australian Recording Industry Association, is based collectively on the weekly physical and digital sales and streams of albums and EPs.

In 2026, 26 albums have so far claimed the top spot. Ten artists, Megadeth, Hilary Duff, Noah Kahan, Maisie Peters, Phoebe Bridgers, DMA's, Alex Warren, Beabadoobee, Fontaines D.C. and Stand Atlantic, achieved their first number-one album.

== Chart history ==
List of number-one albums
Date	Album	Artist(s)	Ref.
5 January	The Art of Loving	Olivia Dean	
12 January	The Art of Loving	Olivia Dean	
19 January	The Art of Loving	Olivia Dean	
26 January	Idols	Yungblud	
2 February	Megadeth	Megadeth	
9 February	The Art of Loving	Olivia Dean	
16 February	In Verses	Karnivool	
23 February	The Art of Loving	Olivia Dean	
2 March	Luck... or Something	Hilary Duff	
9 March	The Art of Loving	Olivia Dean	
16 March	Kiss All the Time. Disco, Occasionally.	Harry Styles	
23 March	Kiss All the Time. Disco, Occasionally.	Harry Styles	
30 March	Arirang	BTS	
6 April	Arirang	BTS	
13 April	The Art of Loving	Olivia Dean	
20 April	The Art of Loving	Olivia Dean	
27 April	The Art of Loving	Olivia Dean	
4 May	The Great Divide	Noah Kahan	
11 May	The Great Divide	Noah Kahan	
18 May	The Great Divide	Noah Kahan	
25 May	Iceman	Drake	
1 June	Florescence	Maisie Peters	
8 June	Iceman	Drake	
15 June	Dinner Party	Niall Horan	
22 June	You Seem Pretty Sad for a Girl So in Love	Olivia Rodrigo	
29 June	You Seem Pretty Sad for a Girl So in Love	Olivia Rodrigo	
6 July	You Seem Pretty Sad for a Girl So in Love	Olivia Rodrigo	
13 July	Confessions II	Madonna	
20 July	You Seem Pretty Sad for a Girl So in Love	Olivia Rodrigo	
27 July	Daughter from Hell	Gracie Abrams	
3 August	Music, Fashion, Film	Charli XCX	
10 August	Petal	Ariana Grande	
17 August	You Seem Pretty Sad for a Girl So in Love	Olivia Rodrigo	
24 August	Lost Weekend	Phoebe Bridgers	
31 August	DMA's	DMA's	
7 September	Wildchild	Alex Warren	
14 September	Karaoke Bar	Angus & Julia Stone	
21 September	You Seem Pretty Sad for a Girl So in Love	Olivia Rodrigo	
28 September	Pylon	Beabadoobee	
5 October	The Life of a Showgirl	Taylor Swift	
12 October	The Art of Loving	Olivia Dean	
19 October	The Art of Loving	Olivia Dean	
26 October	Dopamine Chamber	Fontaines D.C.	
2 November	Godbreath	Stand Atlantic	
9 November	Perfecth	Queens of the Stone Age	
16 November	You Seem Pretty Sad for a Girl So in Love	Olivia Rodrigo	
23 November	Carnaval de Luz	U2	

== Number-one artists ==
List of number-one artists, with total weeks spent at number one shown
Position	Artist	Weeks at No. 1
1	Olivia Dean	11
2	Olivia Rodrigo	7
3	Noah Kahan	3
4	Harry Styles	2
4	BTS	2
4	Drake	2
5	Yungblud	1
5	Megadeth	1
5	Karnivool	1
5	Hilary Duff	1
5	Maisie Peters	1
5	Niall Horan	1
5	Madonna	1
5	Gracie Abrams	1
5	Charli XCX	1
5	Ariana Grande	1
5	Phoebe Bridgers	1
5	DMA's	1
5	Alex Warren	1
5	Angus & Julia Stone	1
5	Beabadoobee	1
5	Taylor Swift	1
5	Fontaines D.C.	1
5	Stand Atlantic	1
5	Queens of the Stone Age	1
5	U2	1

== See also ==
- 2026 in music
- List of number-one singles of 2026 (Australia)
