= List of number-one singles of 2026 (Australia) =

ARIA Charts number-one singles of 2026 < 2025

Other Australian number-one charts of 2026
- albums
- urban singles
- dance singles
- club tracks
- digital tracks
- streaming tracks

The ARIA Singles Chart ranks the best-performing singles in Australia. Its data, published by the Australian Recording Industry Association, is based collectively on the weekly streams and digital and physical sales of singles.

Eleven songs have topped the chart so far in 2026, with "Man I Need" by Olivia Dean starting off the year by continuing its run at the top after spending six weeks at number one in 2025. Five artists, Sam Fender, Ella Langley, Katseye, Tate McRae and Jamie Miller, achieved their first number-one song. Until May, an artist with the first name Olivia continually occupied the number-one spot, with the week-long reign of "Drop Dead" by Olivia Rodrigo interrupting an otherwise continuous run for Olivia Dean. Rodrigo achieved three number ones in 2026, while Dean and Taylor Swift achieved two.

== Chart history ==
List of number-one singles
Issue date	Song	Artist(s)	Ref.
5 January	"Man I Need"	Olivia Dean	
12 January	"Man I Need"	Olivia Dean	
19 January	"Man I Need"	Olivia Dean	
26 January	"Man I Need"	Olivia Dean	
2 February	"Man I Need"	Olivia Dean	
9 February	"Man I Need"	Olivia Dean	
16 February	"Man I Need"	Olivia Dean	
23 February	"Man I Need"	Olivia Dean	
2 March	"Man I Need"	Olivia Dean	
9 March	"Man I Need"	Olivia Dean	
16 March	"Man I Need"	Olivia Dean	
23 March	"Man I Need"	Olivia Dean	
30 March	"Man I Need"	Olivia Dean	
6 April	"Rein Me In"	Sam Fender and Olivia Dean	
13 April	"Man I Need"	Olivia Dean	
20 April	"Rein Me In"	Sam Fender and Olivia Dean	
27 April	"Drop Dead"	Olivia Rodrigo	
4 May	"Rein Me In"	Sam Fender and Olivia Dean	
11 May	"Man I Need"	Olivia Dean	
18 May	"Choosin' Texas"	Ella Langley	
25 May	"Choosin' Texas"	Ella Langley	
1 June	"The Cure"	Olivia Rodrigo	
8 June	"Choosin' Texas"	Ella Langley	
15 June	"I Knew It, I Knew You"	Taylor Swift	
22 June	"Stupid Song"	Olivia Rodrigo	
29 June	"I Knew It, I Knew You"	Taylor Swift	
6 July	"Choosin' Texas"	Ella Langley	
13 July	"Choosin' Texas"	Ella Langley	
20 July	"Choosin' Texas"	Ella Langley	
27 July	"Choosin' Texas"	Ella Langley	
3 August	"Choosin' Texas"	Ella Langley	
10 August	"Choosin' Texas"	Ella Langley	
17 August	"Choosin' Texas"	Ella Langley	
24 August	"Animal"	Katseye	
31 August	"Choosin' Texas"	Ella Langley	
7 September	"Choosin' Texas"	Ella Langley	
14 September	"Choosin' Texas"	Ella Langley	
21 September	"Choosin' Texas"	Ella Langley	
28 September	"Choosin' Texas"	Ella Langley	
5 October	"Patient Zero"	Taylor Swift	
12 October	"Choosin' Texas"	Ella Langley	
19 October	"Patient Zero"	Taylor Swift	
26 October	"Housewife"	Tate McRae	
2 November	"Housewife"	Tate McRae	
9 November	"Housewife"	Tate McRae	
16 November	"Housewife"	Tate McRae	
23 November	"Babydoll"	Jamie Miller	

== Number-one artists ==
List of number-one artists, with total weeks spent at number one shown
Position	Artist	Weeks at No. 1
1	Olivia Dean	18
2	Ella Langley	16
3	Taylor Swift	4
3	Tate McRae	4
4	Sam Fender	3
4	Olivia Rodrigo	3
5	Katseye	1
5	Jamie Miller	1

== See also ==
- 2026 in music
- List of number-one albums of 2026 (Australia)
