= List of number-one urban albums of 2023 (Australia) =

ARIA Charts number-one urban albums of 2023 < 2022 2024 >

Other Australian number-one charts of 2023
- albums
- singles
- urban singles
- dance singles
- club tracks
- digital tracks
- streaming tracks

Top Australian singles and albums of 2023
- Triple J Hottest 100
- top 25 singles
- top 25 albums

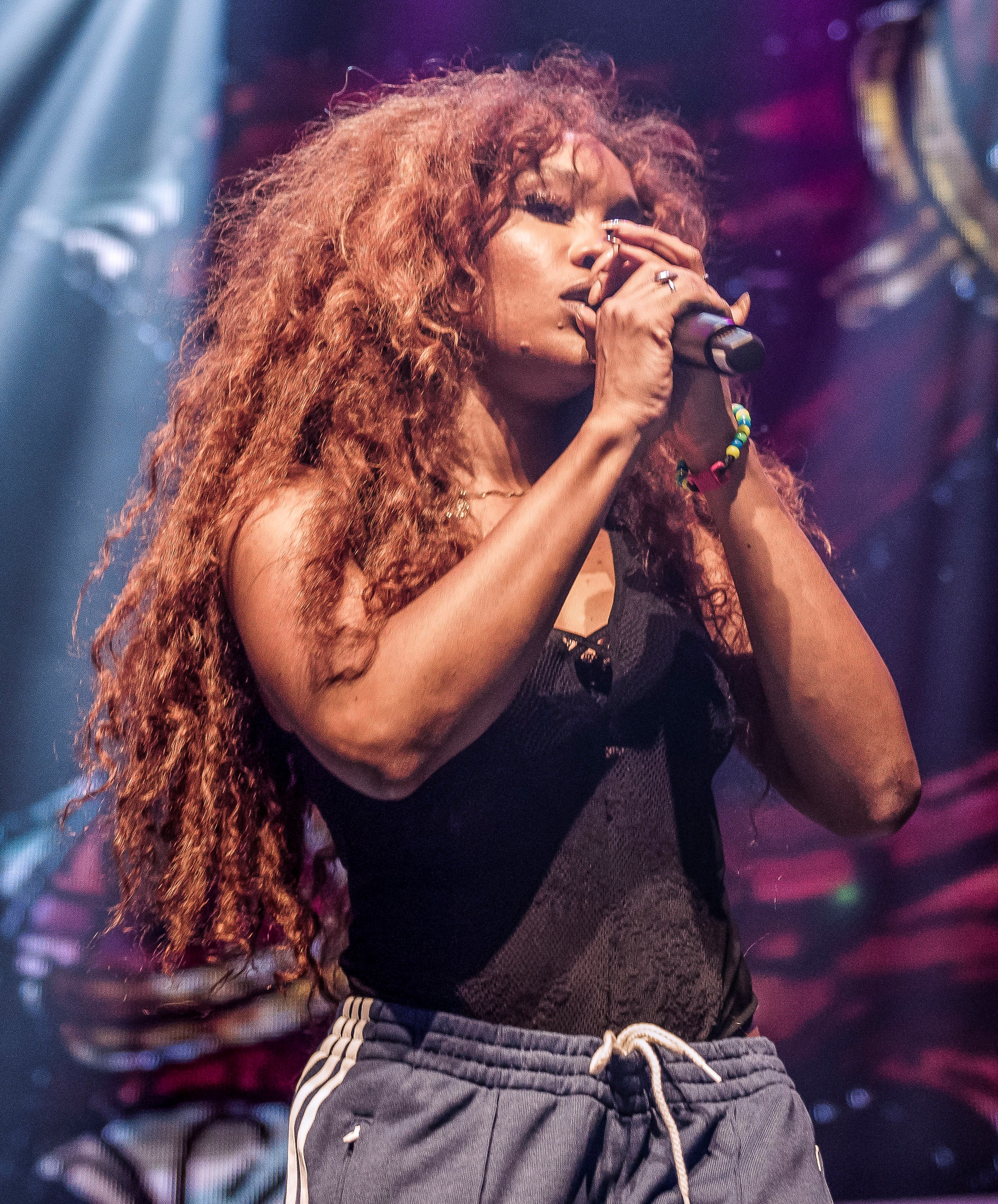
SZA's SOS spent a total of 25 non-consecutive weeks at number-one.

This is a list of albums that reached number-one on the ARIA Hip Hop/R&B Albums Chart in 2023. The ARIA Hip Hop/R&B Albums Chart is a weekly chart that ranks the best-performing hip hop and R&B albums in Australia. It is published by the Australian Recording Industry Association (ARIA), an organisation that collects music data for the weekly ARIA Charts. To be eligible to appear on the chart, the recording must be an album of a predominantly urban nature.

== Chart history ==
Issue date	Album	Artist(s)	Reference
2 January	SOS	SZA	
9 January	SOS	SZA	
16 January	SOS	SZA	
23 January	SOS	SZA	
30 January	SOS	SZA	
6 February	SOS	SZA	
13 February	SOS	SZA	
20 February	SOS	SZA	
27 February	SOS	SZA	
6 March	SOS	SZA	
13 March	SOS	SZA	
20 March	SOS	SZA	
27 March	SOS	SZA	
3 April	SOS	SZA	
10 April	SOS	SZA	
17 April	Hope	NF	
24 April	SOS	SZA	
1 May	SOS	SZA	
8 May	SOS	SZA	
15 May	SOS	SZA	
22 May	SOS	SZA	
29 May	SOS	SZA	
5 June	SOS	SZA	
12 June	Spider-Man: Across the Spider-Verse (soundtrack)	Metro Boomin	
19 June	Spider-Man: Across the Spider-Verse (soundtrack)	Metro Boomin	
26 June	Spider-Man: Across the Spider-Verse (soundtrack)	Metro Boomin	
3 July	A Gift & a Kers	Kerser	
10 July	Pink Tape	Lil Uzi Vert	
17 July	SOS	SZA	
24 July	SOS	SZA	
31 July	SOS	SZA	
7 August	Utopia	Travis Scott	
14 August	Utopia	Travis Scott	
21 August	Utopia	Travis Scott	
28 August	Struggler	Genesis Owusu	
4 September	Starboy	The Weeknd	
11 September	Utopia	Travis Scott	
18 September	Utopia	Travis Scott	
25 September	Utopia	Travis Scott	
2 October	Scarlet	Doja Cat	
9 October	Starboy	The Weeknd	
16 October	For All the Dogs	Drake	
23 October	For All the Dogs	Drake	
30 October	For All the Dogs	Drake	
6 November	For All the Dogs	Drake	
13 November	The Diamond Collection	Post Malone	
20 November	The First Time	The Kid Laroi	
27 November	420DNA	Chillinit	
4 December	The Diamond Collection	Post Malone	
11 December	The Diamond Collection	Post Malone	
18 December	Pink Friday 2	Nicki Minaj	
25 December	Pink Friday 2	Nicki Minaj	

== See also ==
- 2023 in music
- List of number-one albums of 2023 (Australia)
