= List of number-one country albums of 2023 (Australia) =

ARIA Charts number-one country albums of 2023 < 2022 2024 >

Other Australian number-one charts of 2023
- albums
- singles
- urban singles
- dance singles
- club tracks
- digital tracks
- streaming tracks

Top Australian singles and albums of 2023
- Triple J Hottest 100
- top 25 singles
- top 25 albums

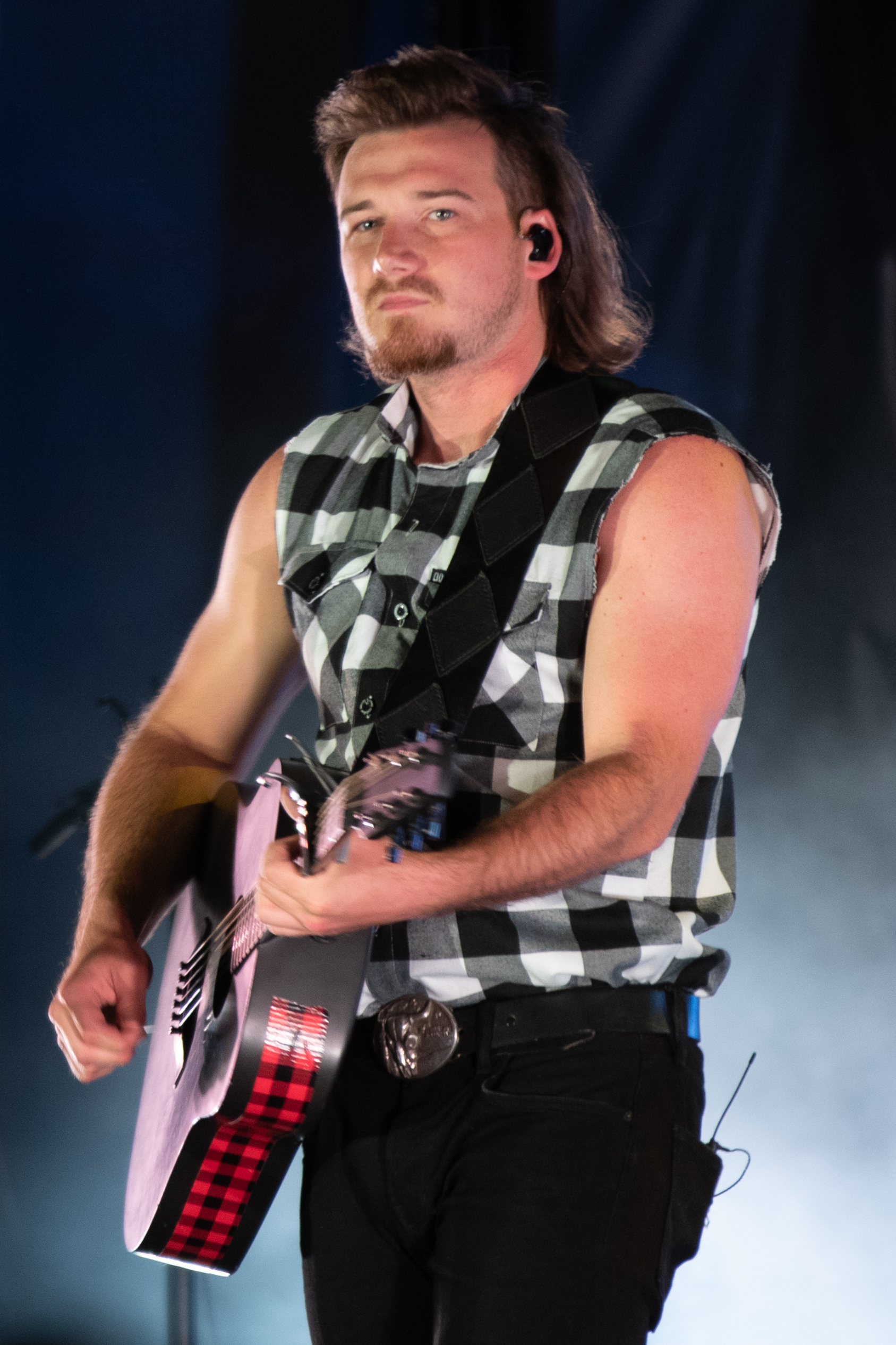
Morgan Wallen's One Thing at a Time spent a total of 27 non-consecutive weeks at number-one.

These are the Australian Country number-one albums of 2023, per the ARIA Charts.

== Chart history ==
Issue date	Album	Artist
2 January	This One's for You	Luke Combs
16 January	This One's for You	Luke Combs
16 January	This One's for You	Luke Combs
23 January	This One's for You	Luke Combs
30 January	This One's for You	Luke Combs
6 February	This One's for You	Luke Combs
13 February	Queen of Me	Shania Twain
20 February	This One's for You	Luke Combs
27 February	This One's for You	Luke Combs
6 March	Home	Kingswood
13 March	One Thing at a Time	Morgan Wallen
20 March	One Thing at a Time	Morgan Wallen
27 March	One Thing at a Time	Morgan Wallen
3 April	Gettin' Old	Luke Combs
10 April	One Thing at a Time	Morgan Wallen
17 April	One Thing at a Time	Morgan Wallen
24 April	One Thing at a Time	Morgan Wallen
1 May	One Thing at a Time	Morgan Wallen
8 May	One Thing at a Time	Morgan Wallen
15 May	One Thing at a Time	Morgan Wallen
22 May	One Thing at a Time	Morgan Wallen
29 May	One Thing at a Time	Morgan Wallen
5 June	One Thing at a Time	Morgan Wallen
12 June	One Thing at a Time	Morgan Wallen
19 June	One Thing at a Time	Morgan Wallen
26 June	Any Less Anymore	Travis Collins
3 July	One Thing at a Time	Morgan Wallen
10 July	One Thing at a Time	Morgan Wallen
17 July	Speak Now (Taylor's Version)	Taylor Swift
24 July	Speak Now (Taylor's Version)	Taylor Swift
31 July	Speak Now (Taylor's Version)	Taylor Swift
7 August	Speak Now (Taylor's Version)	Taylor Swift
14 August	Speak Now (Taylor's Version)	Taylor Swift
21 August	Speak Now (Taylor's Version)	Taylor Swift
28 August	Speak Now (Taylor's Version)	Taylor Swift
4 September	Zach Bryan	Zach Bryan
11 September	Zach Bryan	Zach Bryan
18 September	Zach Bryan	Zach Bryan
25 September	One Thing at a Time	Morgan Wallen
2 October	One Thing at a Time	Morgan Wallen
9 October	One Thing at a Time	Morgan Wallen
16 October	One Thing at a Time	Morgan Wallen
23 October	Zach Bryan	Zach Bryan
30 October	One Thing at a Time	Morgan Wallen
6 November	One Thing at a Time	Morgan Wallen
13 November	One Thing at a Time	Morgan Wallen
20 November	One Thing at a Time	Morgan Wallen
27 November	One Thing at a Time	Morgan Wallen
4 December	Speak Now (Taylor's Version)	Taylor Swift
11 December	One Thing at a Time	Morgan Wallen
18 December	One Thing at a Time	Morgan Wallen
25 December	Speak Now (Taylor's Version)	Taylor Swift

== See also ==
- 2023 in music
- List of number-one albums of 2023 (Australia)
