= What Was I Made For? =

2023 single by Billie Eilish

Single by Billie Eilish

from the album Barbie the Album
- Written: January 2023 (Note: In an interview with Apple Music, Eilish said that she started writing the song with Finneas on January 17, 2023, and finished it in the next few days.)
- Released: July 13, 2023
- Recorded: February 2023 (Note: In a video for Vanity Fair, Eilish said she recorded "What Was I Made For?" two weeks after she started working on it.)
- Genre: Pop
- Length: 3:42
- Label: Darkroom; Interscope; Atlantic
- Songwriters: Billie O'Connell; Finneas O'Connell
- Producer: Finneas

Billie Eilish singles chronology
"Male Fantasy" (2021)	"What Was I Made For?" (2023)	"Lunch" (2024)

Music video
- "What Was I Made For?" on YouTube

"What Was I Made For?" is a song by American singer-songwriter Billie Eilish. It was released through Atlantic, Darkroom, and Interscope Records on July 13, 2023, as the fifth single from the soundtrack to the fantasy comedy film Barbie (2023). The song was commercially successful worldwide and reached number-one in Australia, Ireland, Malaysia, Switzerland, and the United Kingdom, as well as peaking at No. 14 on the Billboard Hot 100 in the United States.

It received five nominations at the 66th Annual Grammy Awards, including Record of the Year, and won for Song of the Year (becoming the first song from a film since Celine Dion's "My Heart Will Go On" from Titanic to win in this category) and Best Song Written for Visual Media. It won the Golden Globe Award for Best Original Song at the 81st Golden Globe Awards and also won the Academy Award for Best Original Song at the 96th Academy Awards, marking Eilish as the youngest person in history to ever win a second Academy Award in any category (due to her previous win, in the same category, for James Bond's film No Time To Die's theme song of the same name).

== Background and release ==
In an interview with Time in early July 2023, Mark Ronson, who served as the music producer of Barbie the Album, announced that there were more surprise guests on the soundtrack than had yet been revealed at that time, describing the artist as having a "very personal, idiosyncratic tie to Barbie". However, he skipped the question if Eilish was going to be one of the two. Eilish previously sparked speculation about a possible appearance when she posted a picture of a Barbie neon sign on her Instagram on June 27.

On July 6, 2023, Eilish announced the single on her social media. In an accompanying announcement, she said that the song "means the absolute" world to her. The singer hoped that the track would "change lives" and told her fans to "get ready to sob". A snippet of the single appeared in a trailer for the film on July 10, 2023. Eilish also teased the single and music video on Twitter on July 12. The song was released the following day on July 13. In the film itself, which premiered the same month, the song accompanies a scene in which Barbie meets the spirit of her creator Ruth Handler.

== Production ==
For the song, Eilish again teamed up with her brother and long-time collaborator Finneas O'Connell. The songwriting process began with director Greta Gerwig showing Eilish and O'Connell a rough cut of the film at Warner Bros. Studios. In an interview with Billboard, Eilish stated that the single was the first song that she and O'Connell had written after a prolonged writer's block.

I did not think about myself once in the writing process. I was purely inspired by this movie and this character and the way I thought she would feel, and wrote about that. And then, over the next couple days, I was listening and I was like, girl, how did this … honestly, and I really don’t mean this to come off a conceited way at all, but I do this thing where I make stuff that I don’t even know is … like I'm writing for myself and I don't even know it.

— Billie Eilish, on the songwriting process for "What Was I Made For?"

== Critical reception ==
“What Was I Made For?” was met with widespread critical acclaim from music critics, many of whom regarded it as one of the best songs of 2023. Writing for Stereogum, Tom Breihan noted metaphors in the lyrics that parallels Barbie's plot and compared the song to "Happier Than Ever", but lamented that "It seems like it’s building to a grand, cathartic finale, but that finale never arrives". Jon Mendelsohn of American Songwriter called the chorus "melancholy yet hopeful". Walden Green of The Fader saw the song as a "sly commentary on pop stars 'created' for the profit of record labels". Jon Campbell of WNYC and Gothamist noted the melodic similarity of the verse to the chorus of Stephen Sondheim's "Send in the Clowns".

=== Year-end lists ===
Select year-end rankings of "What Was I Made For?"
Publication	List	Rank	Ref.
BBC	The Best Songs of 2023	16	
Billboard	The 100 Best Songs of 2023 (Staff Picks)	2	
Business Insider	Best Songs of 2023	8	
Entertainment Weekly	10 Best Songs of 2023	9	
Los Angeles Times	The 100 Best Songs of 2023	10	
NME	The 50 Best Songs of 2023	7	
Rolling Stone	The 100 Best Songs of 2023	9	
Slant Magazine	50 Best Songs of 2023	4	
The Guardian	The 20 Best Songs of 2023	11	
The Hollywood Reporter	The 10 Best Songs of 2023	6	
The Washington Post	The Best Singles of 2023	2	
USA Today	Best Songs of 2023	—N/a	
Variety	The Best Songs of 2023	1	

== Music video ==
The music video for "What Was I Made For?" was released alongside the single on July 13, 2023. The video, directed by Eilish herself, was shot in one take, and portrays Eilish in a yellow dress (the color Stereotypical Barbie wears at the end of the film) and a blonde wig styled with bangs and a high ponytail similar to the hairstyle of the original 1959 Barbie. Eilish sits at a school desk in an empty, monochromatic space. From a Barbie-themed case, she removes and examines doll clothing resembling outfits Eilish has worn publicly in the past, which she organizes on a miniature hanging rack. As the song progresses, a brief earthquake, a strong wind, and rain threaten to disrupt her efforts. When the rain ends, Eilish quickly stuffs the doll clothes back into their case and walks away, taking the doll case with her. Shortly after the song's ending, Eilish returns briefly to collect a forgotten accessory before exiting once more.

In W, Matthew Velasco interpreted the music video as Eilish's "way of telling us she's done with her signature baggy look" and that "this feels like the beginning of a new era for Eilish".

== Accolades ==
Awards and nominations for "What Was I Made For?"
Year	Award	Category	Result	Ref.
2023	Hollywood Music in Media Awards	Best Original Song in a Feature Film	Won	
2023	Las Vegas Film Critics Society	Best Song	Nominated	
2023	MTV Video Music Awards	Song of Summer	Nominated	
2023	RTHK International Pop Poll Awards	Top Ten International Gold Songs	Nominated	
2023	Variety's Hitmakers	Film Song of the Year	Won	
2024	Academy Awards	Best Original Song	Won	
2024	Astra Film Awards	Best Original Song	Nominated	
2024	Brit Awards	International Song of the Year	Nominated	
2024	Chicago Indie Critics	Best Original Song	Nominated	
2024	Critics Association of Central Florida	Best Original Song	Runner-up	
2024	Critics' Choice Movie Awards	Best Song	Nominated	
2024	Denver Film Critics Society	Best Original Song	Won	
2024	DiscussingFilm Critic Awards	Best Original Song	Runner-up	
2024	GAFFA Awards (Sweden)	International Song of the Year	Won	
2024	Georgia Film Critics Association	Best Original Song	Won	
2024	Gold Derby Film Awards	Best Original Song	Nominated	
2024	Golden Globe Awards	Best Original Song	Won	
2024	Grammy Awards	Record of the Year	Nominated	
2024	Grammy Awards	Song of the Year	Won	
2024	Grammy Awards	Best Pop Solo Performance	Nominated	
2024	Grammy Awards	Best Song Written for Visual Media	Won	
2024	Grammy Awards	Best Music Video	Nominated	
2024	Guild of Music Supervisors Awards	Best Song Written and/or Recording Created for a Film	Won	
2024	Hawaii Film Critics Society	Best Song	Won	
2024	Hit FM Music Awards	Top Ten Singles	Won	
2024	Houston Film Critics Society	Best Original Song	Nominated	
2024	iHeartRadio Music Awards	Best Lyrics	Nominated	
2024	iHeartRadio Music Awards	Best Music Video	Nominated	
2024	iHeartRadio Music Awards	TikTok Bop of the Year	Nominated	
2024	Latino Entertainment Journalists Association	Best Song Written for a Film	Nominated	
2024	MTV Video Music Awards	Video for Good	Won	
2024	Music City Film Critics Association	Best Original Song	Won	
2024	New Mexico Film Critics	Best Original Song	Won	
2024	Nickelodeon Kids' Choice Awards	Favorite Song	Won	
2024	North Carolina Film Critics Association	Best Original Song	Nominated	
2024	North Dakota Film Society	Best Original Song	Won	
2024	Online Film Critics Society	Technical Achievements: Original Song	Honored	
2024	Online Film & Television Association	Best Original Song	Won	
2024	Palm Springs International Film Festival	Chairman's Award	Won	
2024	Santa Barbara International Film Festival	Variety's Artisans Award	Won	
2024	Satellite Awards	Best Original Song	Won	
2024	Society of Composers & Lyricists	Outstanding Original Song for a Comedy or Musical Visual Media Production	Won	
2024	World Soundtrack Awards	Best Original Song	Won	
2024	Žebřík Music Awards	Foreign International Composition of the Year	3rd Place	
2024	Žebřík Music Awards	Foreign International Video Clip of the Year	2nd Place	

== Personnel ==
All credits are adapted from CD liner notes of Barbie the Album.

- Billie Eilish O'Connell – songwriter, vocal production, engineering, vocals
- Finneas O'Connell – songwriter, producer, engineering, piano, synths, electric bass, percussion, vocal arrangement
- Mark Ronson – additional production, orchestral arrangement
- Andrew Wyatt – additional production, orchestral arrangement
- Rob Kinelski – mixing
- Eli Heisler – assistant mixing

== Charts ==
=== Weekly charts ===
Weekly chart performance for "What Was I Made For?"
Chart (2023–2024)	Peak position
Australia (ARIA)	1
Austria (Ö3 Austria Top 40)	3
Belgium (Ultratop 50 Flanders)	10
Belgium (Ultratop 50 Wallonia)	29
Canada Hot 100 (Billboard)	10
Canada AC (Billboard)	13
Canada CHR/Top 40 (Billboard)	8
Canada Hot AC (Billboard)	20
Croatia International Airplay (Top lista)	24
Czech Republic Singles Digital (ČNS IFPI)	6
Denmark (Tracklisten)	13
Estonia Airplay (TopHit)	16
Finland (Suomen virallinen lista)	15
France (SNEP)	25
Germany (GfK)	9
Global 200 (Billboard)	2
Greece International (IFPI)	7
Hong Kong (Billboard)	25
Hungary (Single Top 40)	15
Iceland (Tónlistinn)	7
Indonesia (Billboard)	23
Ireland (IRMA)	1
Italy (FIMI)	61
Japan Hot Overseas (Billboard Japan)	8
Latvia Streaming (LaIPA)	9
Lithuania (AGATA)	12
Luxembourg (Billboard)	3
Malaysia (Billboard)	3
Malaysia International (RIM)	2
MENA (IFPI)	15
Netherlands (Dutch Top 40)	14
Netherlands (Single Top 100)	5
New Zealand (Recorded Music NZ)	2
Norway (VG-lista)	4
Philippines (Billboard)	7
Poland (Polish Streaming Top 100)	16
Portugal (AFP)	18
Singapore (RIAS)	3
Slovakia Singles Digital (ČNS IFPI)	6
South Africa (Billboard)	17
South Korea BGM (Circle)	23
South Korea Download (Circle)	137
Spain (Promusicae)	85
Sweden (Sverigetopplistan)	5
Switzerland (Schweizer Hitparade)	1
UK Singles (Official Charts)	1
US Billboard Hot 100	14
US Adult Contemporary (Billboard)	15
US Adult Pop Airplay (Billboard)	1
US Dance Airplay (Billboard)	35
US Hot Rock & Alternative Songs (Billboard)	1
US Pop Airplay (Billboard)	6
Vietnam (Vietnam Hot 100)	75

2026 weekly chart performance
Chart (2026)	Peak position
Norway Airplay (IFPI Norge)	36

=== Monthly charts ===
Monthly chart performance for "What Was I Made For?"
Chart (2024)	Peak position
Estonia Airplay (TopHit)	22

=== Year-end charts ===
2023 year-end chart performance for "What Was I Made For?"
Chart (2023)	Position
Australia (ARIA)	62
Austria (Ö3 Austria Top 40)	63
Belgium (Ultratop 50 Flanders)	75
Canada (Canadian Hot 100)	62
Germany (Official German Charts)	93
Global 200 (Billboard)	111
Hungary (Single Top 40)	60
Iceland (Tónlistinn)	54
Israel (Galgalatz)	5
Netherlands (Dutch Top 40)	80
Netherlands (Single Top 100)	65
Switzerland (Schweizer Hitparade)	53
UK Singles (OCC)	45
US Billboard Hot 100	81
US Hot Rock & Alternative Songs (Billboard)	8

2024 year-end chart performance for "What Was I Made For?"
Chart (2024)	Position
Australia (ARIA)	89
France (SNEP)	193
Global 200 (Billboard)	44
Iceland (Tónlistinn)	76
Portugal (AFP)	97
UK Singles (OCC)	63
US Billboard Hot 100	46
US Adult Contemporary (Billboard)	33
US Adult Top 40 (Billboard)	6
US Mainstream Top 40 (Billboard)	31
US Hot Rock & Alternative Songs (Billboard)	6

2025 year-end chart performance for "What Was I Made For?"
Chart (2025)	Position
Canada AC (Billboard)	74

== Certifications ==
Certifications for "What Was I Made For?"
Region	Certification	Certified units/sales
Australia (ARIA)	4× Platinum	280,000^{‡}
Austria (IFPI Austria)	Platinum	30,000^{‡}
Belgium (BRMA)	2× Platinum	80,000^{‡}
Brazil (Pro-Música Brasil)	2× Diamond	320,000^{‡}
Canada (Music Canada)	6× Platinum	480,000^{‡}
Denmark (IFPI Danmark)	Platinum	90,000^{‡}
France (SNEP)	Diamond	333,333^{‡}
Germany (BVMI)	Gold	300,000^{‡}
Italy (FIMI)	Platinum	100,000^{‡}
New Zealand (RMNZ)	3× Platinum	90,000^{‡}
Poland (ZPAV)	2× Platinum	100,000^{‡}
Portugal (AFP)	2× Platinum	20,000^{‡}
Spain (Promusicae)	Platinum	60,000^{‡}
Switzerland (IFPI Switzerland)	Gold	15,000^{‡}
United Kingdom (BPI)	2× Platinum	1,200,000^{‡}
United States (RIAA)	Platinum	1,000,000^{‡}
Streaming
Greece (IFPI Greece)	Gold	1,000,000^{†}
Sweden (GLF)	Platinum	12,000,000^{†}
^{‡} Sales+streaming figures based on certification alone.^{†} Streaming-only figures based on certification alone.

== Release history ==
Release dates and formats for "What Was I Made For?"
Region	Date	Format(s)	Label(s)	Ref.
Various	July 13, 2023	Digital download; streaming	Darkroom; Interscope	
Italy	July 17, 2023	Radio airplay	Universal	
United States	August 1, 2023	Contemporary hit radio	Darkroom; Interscope	
United States	August 7, 2023	Hot adult contemporary radio	Darkroom; Interscope	
United Kingdom	August 17, 2023	Cassette	Polydor	
United States	November 11, 2023	7" vinyl	Darkroom; Interscope	

== See also ==
- List of number-one singles of 2023 (Australia)
- List of number-one singles of 2023 (Ireland)
- List of UK Singles Chart number ones of the 2020s
