= List of number-one albums of 2023 (Australia) =

ARIA Charts number-one albums of 2023 < 2022 2024 >

Other Australian number-one charts of 2023
- singles
- urban singles
- dance singles
- club tracks
- digital tracks
- streaming tracks

Top Australian singles and albums of 2023
- Triple J Hottest 100
- top 25 singles
- top 25 albums

The ARIA Albums Chart ranks the best-performing albums and extended plays (EPs) in Australia. Its data, published by the Australian Recording Industry Association, is based collectively on the weekly physical and digital sales and streams of albums and EPs. In 2023, 32 albums claimed the top spot. The first number one of the year, Midnights by Taylor Swift, carried over from the end of 2022. Ten artists, SZA, Morgan Wallen, Melanie Martinez, Cub Sport, Peach PRC, Lewis Capaldi, Niall Horan, Kerser, G Flip and Polaris, achieved their first number-one album. Swift achieved three number-one albums within the year, while Ed Sheeran achieved two.

== Chart history ==
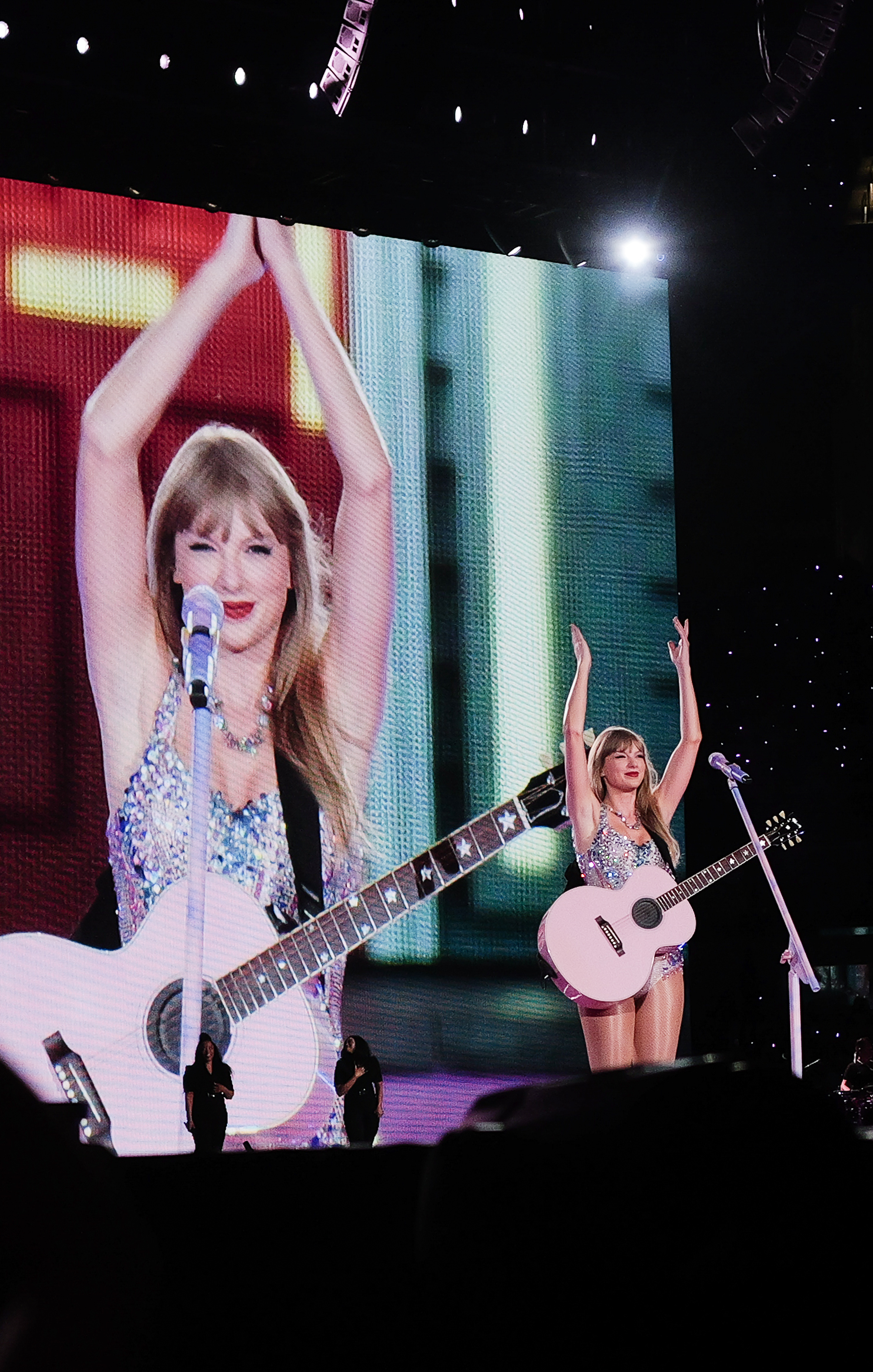
American singer-songwriter Taylor Swift's 1989 (Taylor's Version) was the longest running and best selling album of the year.

Key
†	Indicates best-performing album of 2023

List of number-one albums
Date	Album	Artist(s)	Ref.
2 January	Midnights	Taylor Swift	
9 January	Midnights	Taylor Swift	
16 January	Midnights	Taylor Swift	
23 January	Midnights	Taylor Swift	
30 January	SOS	SZA	
6 February	Gloria	Sam Smith	
13 February	Midnights	Taylor Swift	
20 February	This Is Why	Paramore	
27 February	Trustfall	Pink	
6 March	Harry's House	Harry Styles	
13 March	Harry's House	Harry Styles	
20 March	Endless Summer Vacation	Miley Cyrus	
27 March	One Thing at a Time	Morgan Wallen	
3 April	Did You Know That There's a Tunnel Under Ocean Blvd	Lana Del Rey	
10 April	Portals	Melanie Martinez	
17 April	Jesus at the Gay Bar	Cub Sport	
24 April	72 Seasons	Metallica	
1 May	One Thing at a Time	Morgan Wallen	
8 May	Manic Dream Pixie	Peach PRC	
15 May	-	Ed Sheeran	
22 May	-	Ed Sheeran	
29 May	Broken by Desire to Be Heavenly Sent	Lewis Capaldi	
5 June	Midnights	Taylor Swift	
12 June	But Here We Are	Foo Fighters	
19 June	The Show	Niall Horan	
26 June	The Winding Way	The Teskey Brothers	
3 July	A Gift & a Kers	Kerser	
10 July	Midnights	Taylor Swift	
17 July	Speak Now (Taylor's Version)	Taylor Swift	
24 July	Speak Now (Taylor's Version)	Taylor Swift	
31 July	Barbie the Album	Various artists	
7 August	Utopia	Travis Scott	
14 August	Utopia	Travis Scott	
21 August	Drummer	G Flip	
28 August	Barbie the Album	Various artists	
4 September	Vulture Street (20th Anniversary Edition)	Powderfinger	
11 September	Fatalism	Polaris	
18 September	Guts	Olivia Rodrigo	
25 September	Guts	Olivia Rodrigo	
2 October	Tension	Kylie Minogue	
9 October	Autumn Variations	Ed Sheeran	
16 October	For All the Dogs	Drake	
23 October	Something to Give Each Other	Troye Sivan	
30 October	Hackney Diamonds	The Rolling Stones	
6 November	1989 (Taylor's Version) †	Taylor Swift	
13 November	1989 (Taylor's Version) †	Taylor Swift	
20 November	1989 (Taylor's Version) †	Taylor Swift	
27 November	1989 (Taylor's Version) †	Taylor Swift	
4 December	1989 (Taylor's Version) †	Taylor Swift	
11 December	1989 (Taylor's Version) †	Taylor Swift	
18 December	1989 (Taylor's Version) †	Taylor Swift	
25 December	1989 (Taylor's Version) †	Taylor Swift	

== Number-one artists ==
List of number-one artists, with total weeks spent at number one shown
Position	Artist	Weeks at No. 1
1	Taylor Swift	17
2	Ed Sheeran	3
3	Harry Styles	2
3	Morgan Wallen	2
3	Travis Scott	2
3	Olivia Rodrigo	2
4	SZA	1
4	Sam Smith	1
4	Paramore	1
4	Pink	1
4	Miley Cyrus	1
4	Lana Del Rey	1
4	Melanie Martinez	1
4	Cub Sport	1
4	Metallica	1
4	Peach PRC	1
4	Lewis Capaldi	1
4	Foo Fighters	1
4	Niall Horan	1
4	The Teskey Brothers	1
4	Kerser	1
4	G Flip	1
4	Powderfinger	1
4	Polaris	1
4	Kylie Minogue	1
4	Drake	1
4	Troye Sivan	1
4	The Rolling Stones	1

== See also ==
- 2023 in music
- List of number-one singles of 2023 (Australia)
