= S.C.O.T. =

S.C.O.T

Studio album by Kerser
- Released: 25 October 2013
- Length: 55:31
- Label: Obese

Kerser chronology
| No Rest for the Sickest (2012) | S.C.O.T (2013) | King (2014) |

Singles from S.C.O.T
- 1. "Scott vs Kers" Released: 11 October 2013

S.C.O.T. (an acronym for Sickest Cunt Out There) is the third studio album by Australian rapper Kerser. It was released on 25 October 2013 under Obese Records.

Kerser embarked on an Australian tour from February–March 2014 for the release of S.C.O.T.

== Track listing ==
S.C.O.T. track listing
| No. | Title | Length |
|---|---|---|
| 1. | "One of a Kind" | 4:27 |
| 2. | "The Real Shit" | 3:50 |
| 3. | "9 Outta 9" | 3:49 |
| 4. | "What the Fucks Up" | 3:50 |
| 5. | "Hit My Spliff 2nite" | 4:18 |
| 6. | "Scott Vs Kers" | 4:12 |
| 7. | "This Tha Jam" | 3:58 |
| 8. | "Secret Society" | 3:20 |
| 9. | "Life Is" | 3:08 |
| 10. | "Bible 4 My Enemies" | 2:16 |
| 11. | "4 the Fans" | 4:19 |
| 12. | "I Breathe Rap" | 3:27 |
| 13. | "Let Em Fall Back" | 3:35 |
| 14. | "Kindness 4 Weakness" | 3:13 |
| 15. | "Living the Life" | 4:09 |
| Total length: | | 55:31 |

== Charts ==
Chart performance for S.C.O.T.
| Chart (2013) | Peak position |
|---|---|
| Australian Albums (ARIA) | 5 |
