= List of number-one club tracks of 2023 (Australia) =

ARIA Charts number-one club tracks of 2023 < 2022 2024 >

Other Australian number-one charts of 2023
- albums
- singles
- urban singles
- dance singles
- digital tracks
- streaming tracks

Top Australian singles and albums of 2023
- Triple J Hottest 100
- top 25 singles
- top 25 albums

This is the list of number-one tracks on the ARIA Club Chart in 2023, and is compiled by the Australian Recording Industry Association (ARIA) from weekly DJ reports.

== 2023 ==
Date	Song	Artist(s)	Reference
2 January	"Don't Mess with My Man" (John Course/Sgt Slick mix)	Zoë Badwi	
9 January	"Don't Mess with My Man" (John Course/Sgt Slick mix)	Zoë Badwi	
16 January	"Don't Mess with My Man" (John Course/Sgt Slick mix)	Zoë Badwi	
23 January	"Fired Up" (Extended/Full Intention/Mark Maxwell mix)	Archie Versace and Supermini	
30 January	"Fired Up" (Extended/Full Intention/Mark Maxwell mix)	Archie Versace and Supermini	
6 February	"Heaven" (Extended mix)	Harpoon, Janai	
13 February	"Spinning Around" (Extended mix/Club/Dub mix/ Dr. Packer mix)	Jolyon Petch	
20 February	"Spinning Around" (Extended mix/Club/Dub mix/ Dr. Packer mix)	Jolyon Petch	
27 February	"Spinning Around" (Extended mix/Club/Dub mix/ Dr. Packer mix)	Jolyon Petch	
6 March	"Spinning Around" (Extended mix/Club/Dub mix/ Dr. Packer mix)	Jolyon Petch	
13 March	"Rhyme Dust"	MK and Dom Dolla	
20 March	"Rhyme Dust"	MK and Dom Dolla	
27 March	"Rhyme Dust"	MK and Dom Dolla	
3 April	"Rhyme Dust"	MK and Dom Dolla	
10 April	"Rhyme Dust"	MK and Dom Dolla	
17 April	"To the Moon and Back"	Chusap and Mason Watts	
24 April	"Rhyme Dust"	MK and Dom Dolla	
1 May	"Rhyme Dust"	MK and Dom Dolla	
8 May	"Rhyme Dust"	MK and Dom Dolla	
15 May	"Rhyme Dust"	MK and Dom Dolla	
22 May	"Rhyme Dust"	MK and Dom Dolla	
29 May	"Rhyme Dust"	MK and Dom Dolla	
5 June	"Rhyme Dust"	MK and Dom Dolla	
12 June	"Eat Your Man (Extended Mix)"	Dom Dolla and Nelly Furtado	
19 June	"Eat Your Man (Extended Mix)"	Dom Dolla and Nelly Furtado	
26 June	"Eat Your Man (Extended Mix)"	Dom Dolla and Nelly Furtado	
3 July	"Eat Your Man (Extended Mix)"	Dom Dolla and Nelly Furtado	
10 July	"Eat Your Man (Extended Mix)"	Dom Dolla and Nelly Furtado	
17 July	"Eat Your Man (Extended Mix)"	Dom Dolla and Nelly Furtado	
24 July	"(It Goes Like) Nanana"	Peggy Gou	
31 July	"(It Goes Like) Nanana"	Peggy Gou	
7 August	"(It Goes Like) Nanana"	Peggy Gou	
14 August	"(It Goes Like) Nanana"	Peggy Gou	
21 August	"(It Goes Like) Nanana"	Peggy Gou	
28 August	"(It Goes Like) Nanana"	Peggy Gou	
4 September	"(It Goes Like) Nanana"	Peggy Gou	
11 September	"(It Goes Like) Nanana"	Peggy Gou	
18 September	"(It Goes Like) Nanana"	Peggy Gou	
25 September	"Atmosphere"	Fisher and Kita Alexander	
2 October	"Atmosphere"	Fisher and Kita Alexander	
9 October	"Atmosphere"	Fisher and Kita Alexander	
16 October	"Atmosphere"	Fisher and Kita Alexander	
23 October	"Atmosphere"	Fisher and Kita Alexander	
30 October	"Saving Up"	Dom Dolla	
6 November	"Saving Up"	Dom Dolla	
13 November	"Saving Up"	Dom Dolla	
20 November	"Saving Up"	Dom Dolla	
27 November	"Saving Up"	Dom Dolla	
4 December	"Saving Up"	Dom Dolla	
11 December	"Saving Up"	Dom Dolla	
18 December	"Saving Up"	Dom Dolla	
25 December	"Saving Up"	Dom Dolla	

== Number-one artists ==
Position	Artist	Weeks at No. 1
1	Dom Dolla	27
2	MK	12
3	Peggy Gou	9
4	Nelly Furtado	6
4	Fisher	5
4	Kita Alexander	5
5	Jolyon Petch	4
6	Zoë Badwi	3
7	Archie Versace	2
7	Supermini	2
8	Harpoon	1
8	Janai	1
8	Chusap	1
8	Mason Watts	1

== See also ==
- 2023 in music
