= Kerser =

Australian rapper (born 1987)

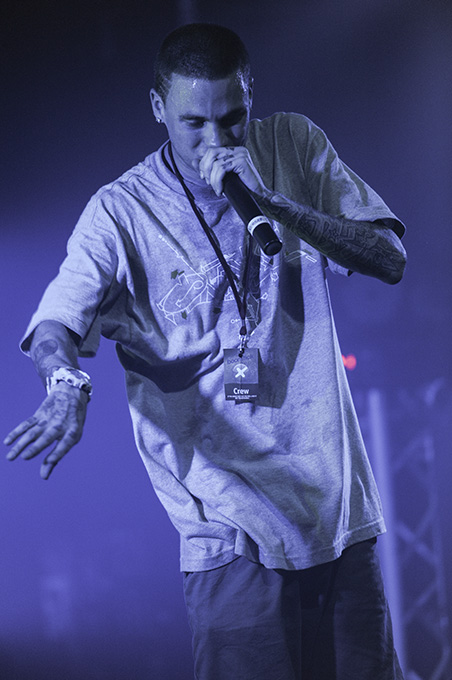
- Kerser performing in 2013

Background information
- Also known as: Scott Barrow, Kers, King Kers, The Sickest, Scotty Wilson
- Born: Scott Froml; 21 August 1987 (age 39); Campbelltown, New South Wales, Australia
- Genres: Australian hip hop; Gutter rap
- Occupation: Rapper
- Instrument: Vocals
- Years active: 2007 – present
- Label: ABK
- Website: emceekerser.com

Scott Froml (born 21 August 1987), better known by his stage name Kerser, is an Australian rapper. He has released two mixtapes and several albums since 2009 and his second album No Rest for the Sickest reached No. 15 on the ARIA albums chart, while the album's tour DVD debuted at No. 1 on the ARIA Music DVD chart in 2013. His album S.C.O.T. reached No. 5 while his fourth album King was released on 13 November 2014 and reached number 9. Kerser achieved his first number one on the ARIA Albums Chart in 2023 with his album A Gift & a Kers.

== Biography ==
Scott Froml was born on 21 August 1987, in the vicinity of Campbelltown, New South Wales. Kerser adopted his stage name from his graffiti tag which he frequently wrote during his youth, before beginning his rap career. He started his rap career at an early age while living in Campbelltown. Kerser released 2 mixtapes, then released 10 albums in 12 years. One of his major influences is Tupac.

He was signed to management with Obese Records in 2013, and in late 2015 moved to an independent manager. In March 2013 he released the single "We Here Now" with Rates, which led to a national tour. Among his performances was the Breath of Life Festival in Tasmania alongside 360 (rapper), Illy, Seth Sentry.

Kerser released his first mixtape Straight Out tha Gutter in 2009 and his second mixtape Down the Drain in 2010.

His first album The Nebulizer was released on 14 October 2011. The album was named after its producer, Nebs. According to an article in INpress, "Kerser is raw, aggressive and territorial," while the album is "A fervent mix of rave, rap, electro and r'n'b." He gained fame from the track "Kerser Is the Sickest" that was also on the first album.

His second album No Rest for the Sickest was released on 2 November 2012. It reached No. 15 on the ARIA Albums Chart, and No. 1 on the ARIA Urban Albums Chart. He toured nationally to support the album.

In August 2013 Kerser released The No Rest for the Sickest National Tour on DVD. It debuted at No. 1 on the ARIA Music DVD Chart.

His third album S.C.O.T. was released on 25 October 2013. The album features Nebs, Jay (Uf), and Jace Excel. It debuted at No. 1 on the ARIA Urban Albums Chart. He toured Australia in February and March 2013 to support the album.

Kerser's fourth album, King, produced by Nebs, was released on 14 November 2014 and peaked at No. 5 on the Australian albums chart.

His fifth album titled Next Step was released on 13 November 2015 and produced by Sinima Beats. It was Kerser's first album to be released under his label ABK Records and was distributed by Warner Music Australia.

Kerser released his sixth album Tradition on 18 November 2016 produced by Sinima Beats. It was released under ABK Records and distributed by Warner Music Australia.

Kerser's seventh album, Engraved in the Game, was released on 10 November 2017, produced by Allrounda and released under ABK Records and distributed through Warner Music Australia.

His eighth album Lifestyle was produced by Open Till L8 and released on 8 March 2019 under ABK Records and distributed by Warner Music Australia.

Kerser released his ninth album Roll the Dice, produced by Open Till L8, on 3 April 2020 through ABK Records and was distributed by Warner Music Australia.

On 23 June 2023 he released his tenth album, A Gift & a Kers, through ABK and Warner Music Australia. The album peaked at No. 1 on the Australian albums chart. The album marked the completion of Kerser's goal to release ten albums over the course of his career, despite being over a 12 year timeframe as opposed to his intended 10 year plan.

== Battle rap career ==
Kerser is a well-known battle rapper in Australia, appearing on circuits such as Got Beef, Grind Time Now Australia and Real Talk Battle League. Between 2010 and 2012, he only lost two battles (to Zone Doubt and Jay Legend respectively), excluding a well-publicised battle against 360 in December 2011, where no official winner was announced, however the decision to make the battle unjudged had come in at the last minute. His long-running rivalry with 360 heated up again in August 2013 when 360 released a diss track called "30 Minutes Tops", Kerser returns with a diss track called "Old Matt". The rivalry and battle is widely known as the most viewed battle rap in the history of Australian hip hop, making it the benchmark for all major battles that have succeeded it. At the time of the battle, it elevated both rapper's careers greatly and showcased the difference between Sydney and Melbourne hip hop street culture. In the years that have followed both Kerser and 360 have shown mutual professional respect for each other.

== Discography ==
=== Albums ===
Title	Album details	Peak chart positions	Certification
Title	Album details	AUS	Certification
The Nebulizer	Released: 14 October 2011; Label: Kerser N Nebs Records (KNR-001); Formats: CD, digital download	73	
No Rest for the Sickest	Released: 2 November 2012; Label: Kerser N Nebs Records (KNR-002); Formats: CD, digital download	15	
S.C.O.T.	Released: 25 October 2013; Label: Kerser N Nebs Records (KNR-003); Formats: CD, digital download	5	
King	Released: 13 November 2014; Label: Kerser N Nebs Records (KNR-004); Formats: CD, digital download	9	
Next Step	Released: 13 November 2015; Label: ABK (ABK003); Formats: CD, digital download	5	ARIA: Gold
Tradition	Released: 18 November 2016; Label: ABK (ABK005) / Warner Music Australia; Formats: CD, digital download	4	
Engraved in the Game	Released: 10 November 2017; Label: ABK (ABK007) / Warner Music Australia; Formats: CD, digital download	5	
Lifestyle	Released: 8 March 2019; Label: ABK (ABK008) / Warner Music Australia; Formats: CD, digital download	2	
Roll the Dice	Released: 3 April 2020; Distribution: Warner Music Australia; Label: ABK (ABK009) / Warner Music Australia	3	
A Gift & a Kers	Released: 23 June 2023; Distribution: Warner Music Australia; Label: ABK / Warner Music Australia	1	
"—" denotes a recording that did not chart or was not released in that territory.

=== Mixtapes ===
Title	Mixtape details
Straight Out Tha Gutter	Released: 2009; Distributed: SydHop; Format: CD, digital Download
Down the Drain	Released: 2010; Distributed: SydHop; Format: CD, digital Download
Tha Sickest	Released: 2014; Distributed: SydHop; Format: CD, digital Download
Still Tha Highest	Released: 2018; Distributed: SydHop; Format: CD, digital Download
Wavey Mixes	Released: 2020; Distributed: SydHop; Format: CD, digital Download

=== EPs ===
Title	EP details
LSP Records	Released: 2020; Distributed: United Masters; Format: CD, digital Download

=== Certified songs ===
Title	Year	Certifications	Album
"Next Step"	2015	ARIA: Gold	Next Step
"Bad Habits"	2016	ARIA: Platinum	Tradition
"Take It And Run" (featuring Jean Rodríguez)	2019	ARIA: Gold	Lifestyle
"Winner"	2021	ARIA: Platinum	A Gift & a Kers

=== Video releases ===
Title	Video details
No Rest for the Sickest Tour	Released: 2012; Distributed: Obese Records; Format: DVD
S.C.O.T Tour	Released: 2014; Distributed: Obese Records; Format: DVD

== Awards and nominations ==
=== ARIA Music Awards ===
The ARIA Music Awards is an annual award ceremony event celebrating the Australian music industry.

Year	Nominee / work	Award	Result	Ref.
2018	Engraved in the Game	Best Urban Release	Nominated	
2023	A Gift & a Kers	Best Hip Hop/Rap Release	Nominated	

== See also ==
- Australian hip hop
- Obese Records
