= List of number-one singles of 2023 (Australia) =

ARIA Charts number-one singles of 2023 < 2022 2024 >

Other Australian number-one charts of 2023
- albums
- urban singles
- dance singles
- club tracks
- digital tracks
- streaming tracks

Top Australian singles and albums of 2023
- Triple J Hottest 100
- top 25 singles
- top 25 albums

The ARIA Singles Chart ranks the best-performing singles in Australia. Its data, published by the Australian Recording Industry Association, is based collectively on the weekly physical and digital sales and streams of singles. Eleven songs topped the chart in 2023, with "All I Want for Christmas Is You" by Mariah Carey being number one in a sixth consecutive year. Six artists, SZA, Miley Cyrus, Morgan Wallen, Dave, Central Cee and Doja Cat, reached the top for the first time.

== Chart history ==
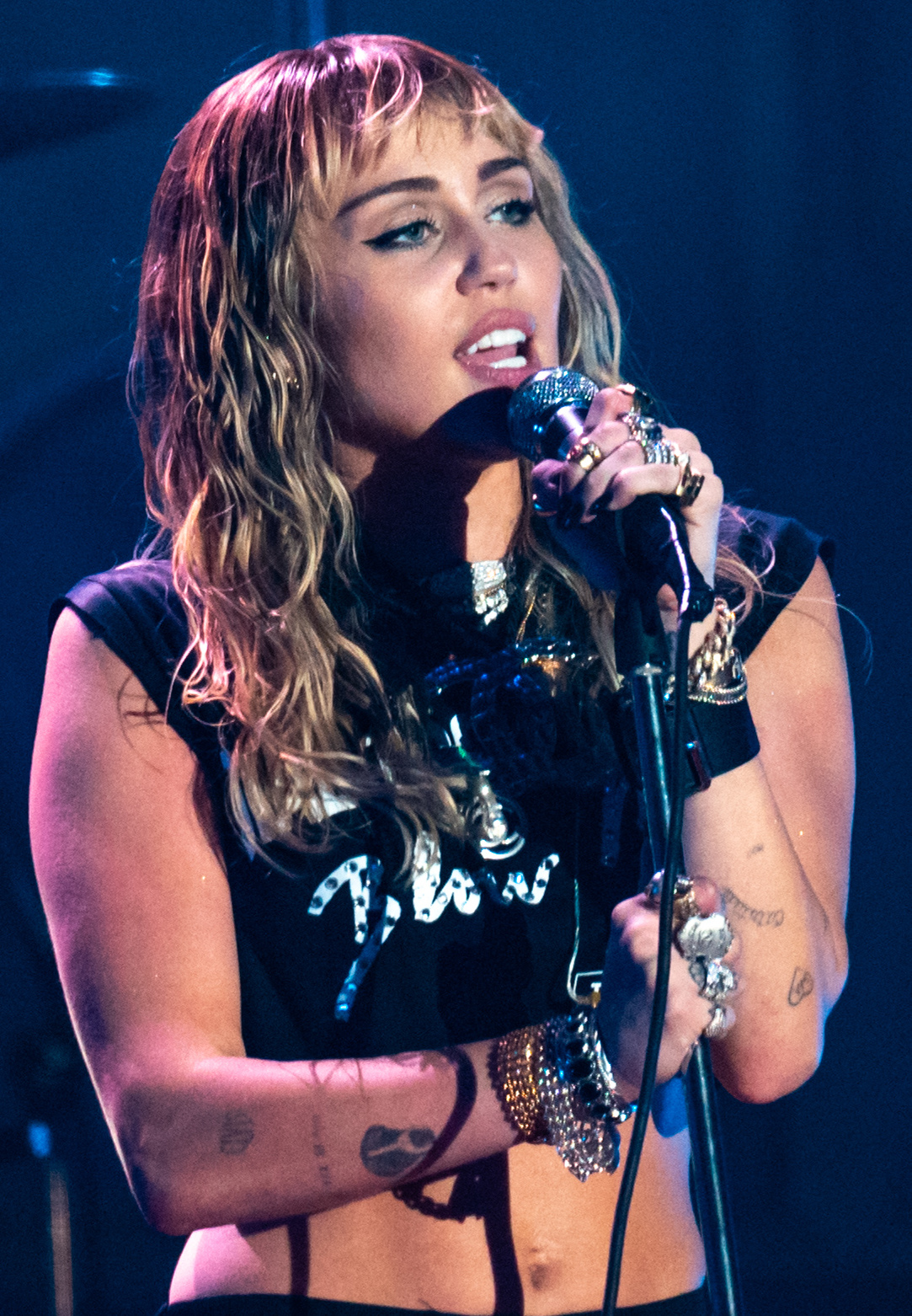
American singer Miley Cyrus earned her first number-one single with "Flowers". It spent twelve consecutive weeks atop the chart and became the longest running number one of the year.

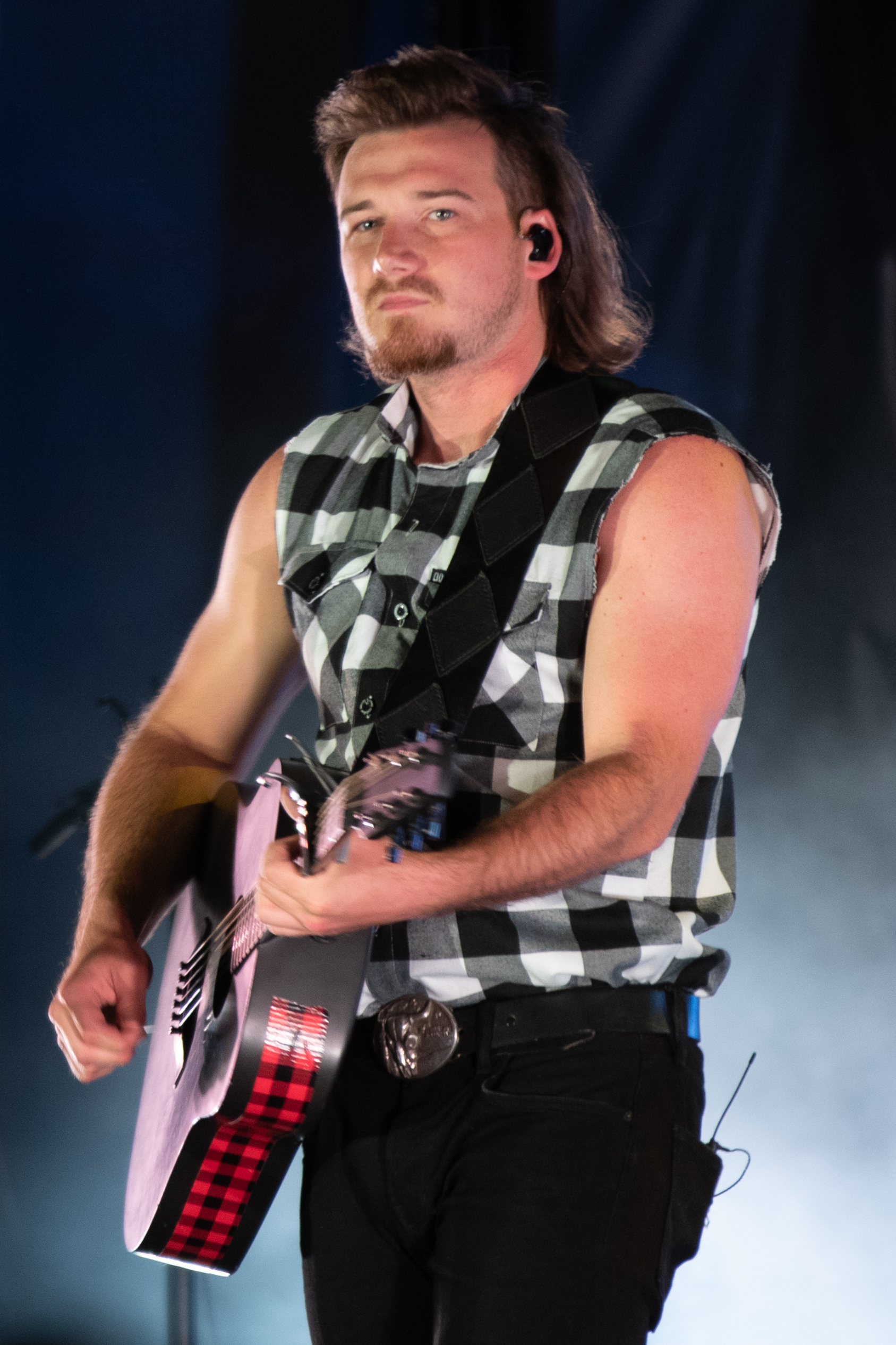
American singer Morgan Wallen spent eight weeks at number one with "Last Night". It was his first number one on the ARIA Singles Chart.

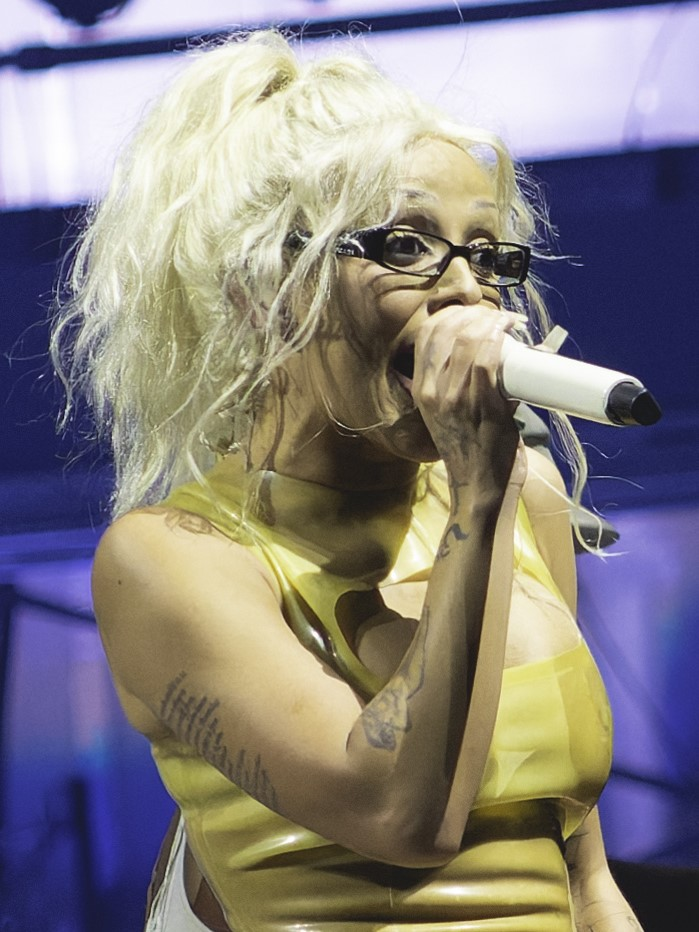
American rapper and singer Doja Cat earned her first number one with "Paint the Town Red", which spent ten weeks atop the chart.

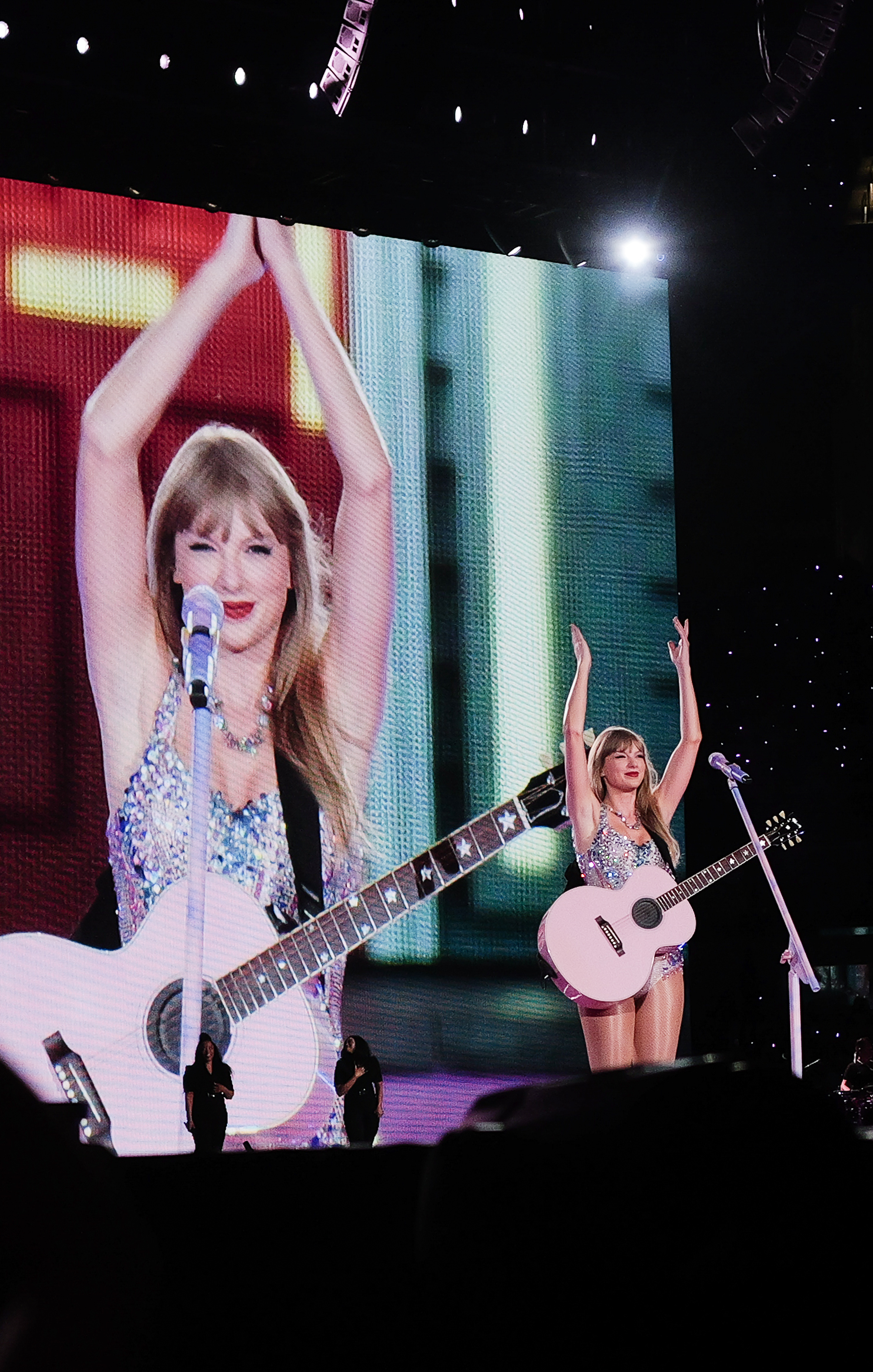
American singer-songwriter Taylor Swift earned her tenth number one with "Is It Over Now?", which spent two weeks atop the chart in November.

Key
| † | Indicates best-performing single of 2023 |

List of number-one singles
| Issue date | Song | Artist(s) | Ref. |
|---|---|---|---|
| 2 January | "All I Want for Christmas Is You" | Mariah Carey | |
| 9 January | "Unholy" | Sam Smith and Kim Petras | |
| 16 January | "Kill Bill" | SZA | |
| 23 January | "Flowers" † | Miley Cyrus | |
| 30 January | "Flowers" † | Miley Cyrus | |
| 6 February | "Flowers" † | Miley Cyrus | |
| 13 February | "Flowers" † | Miley Cyrus | |
| 20 February | "Flowers" † | Miley Cyrus | |
| 27 February | "Flowers" † | Miley Cyrus | |
| 6 March | "Flowers" † | Miley Cyrus | |
| 13 March | "Flowers" † | Miley Cyrus | |
| 20 March | "Flowers" † | Miley Cyrus | |
| 27 March | "Flowers" † | Miley Cyrus | |
| 3 April | "Flowers" † | Miley Cyrus | |
| 10 April | "Flowers" † | Miley Cyrus | |
| 17 April | "Last Night" | Morgan Wallen | |
| 24 April | "Last Night" | Morgan Wallen | |
| 1 May | "Last Night" | Morgan Wallen | |
| 8 May | "Last Night" | Morgan Wallen | |
| 15 May | "Last Night" | Morgan Wallen | |
| 22 May | "Last Night" | Morgan Wallen | |
| 29 May | "Last Night" | Morgan Wallen | |
| 5 June | "Last Night" | Morgan Wallen | |
| 12 June | "Sprinter" | Dave and Central Cee | |
| 19 June | "Sprinter" | Dave and Central Cee | |
| 26 June | "Sprinter" | Dave and Central Cee | |
| 3 July | "Sprinter" | Dave and Central Cee | |
| 10 July | "Vampire" | Olivia Rodrigo | |
| 17 July | "Sprinter" | Dave and Central Cee | |
| 24 July | "Sprinter" | Dave and Central Cee | |
| 31 July | "Sprinter" | Dave and Central Cee | |
| 7 August | "What Was I Made For?" | Billie Eilish | |
| 14 August | "What Was I Made For?" | Billie Eilish | |
| 21 August | "What Was I Made For?" | Billie Eilish | |
| 28 August | "Paint the Town Red" | Doja Cat | |
| 4 September | "Paint the Town Red" | Doja Cat | |
| 11 September | "Paint the Town Red" | Doja Cat | |
| 18 September | "Paint the Town Red" | Doja Cat | |
| 25 September | "Paint the Town Red" | Doja Cat | |
| 2 October | "Paint the Town Red" | Doja Cat | |
| 9 October | "Paint the Town Red" | Doja Cat | |
| 16 October | "Paint the Town Red" | Doja Cat | |
| 23 October | "Paint the Town Red" | Doja Cat | |
| 30 October | "Paint the Town Red" | Doja Cat | |
| 6 November | "Is It Over Now?" | Taylor Swift | |
| 13 November | "Is It Over Now?" | Taylor Swift | |
| 20 November | "Lovin on Me" | Jack Harlow | |
| 27 November | "Lovin on Me" | Jack Harlow | |
| 4 December | "Lovin on Me" | Jack Harlow | |
| 11 December | "Lovin on Me" | Jack Harlow | |
| 18 December | "Lovin on Me" | Jack Harlow | |
| 25 December | "Lovin on Me" | Jack Harlow | |

== Number-one artists ==
List of number-one artists, with total weeks spent at number one shown
| Position | Artist | Weeks at No. 1 |
|---|---|---|
| 1 | Miley Cyrus | 12 |
| 2 | Doja Cat | 10 |
| 3 | Morgan Wallen | 8 |
| 4 | Dave | 7 |
| 4 | Central Cee | 7 |
| 5 | Jack Harlow | 6 |
| 6 | Billie Eilish | 3 |
| 7 | Taylor Swift | 2 |
| 8 | Mariah Carey | 1 |
| 8 | Sam Smith | 1 |
| 8 | Kim Petras | 1 |
| 8 | SZA | 1 |
| 8 | Olivia Rodrigo | 1 |

== See also ==
- 2023 in music
- List of number-one albums of 2023 (Australia)
