= A Gift & a Kers =

Studio album by Kerser
- Released: 23 June 2023
- Genre: Australian hip hop
- Length: 73:21
- Label: ABK

Kerser chronology
Roll the Dice (2020)	A Gift & a Kers (2023)

Singles from A Gift & a Kers
- 1. "Winner" Released: 16 April 2022; 2. "Like I'm Trapped" Released: 6 May 2022; 3. "Telem How" Released: 11 November 2022; 4. "Been Some Time" Released: 2 December 2022

A Gift & a Kers is the tenth studio album by Australian rapper Kerser, released through ABK and Warner Music Australia on 23 June 2023. It was preceded by the lead single "Winner". The album marks Kerser's first number-one album in Australia.

At the 2023 ARIA Music Awards, the album was nominated for Best Hip Hop/Rap Release.

== Background ==
Kerser had expressed a desire to record ten albums in ten years, but his plan was delayed by the COVID-19 pandemic, which allowed him three years to finish his tenth album rather than his usual four-month period between touring. Kerser stated: "I honestly feel like I reached my full potential on this album." He also said, "I feel like I covered every Kers style, so it really takes the fans on a journey. [...] My final thank you and my final imprint on the scene I built."

== Track listing ==
A Gift & a Kers track listing
No.	Title	Length
1.	"The Main Event"	2:09
2.	"Hit After Hit"	2:46
3.	"Ask About Me" (featuring Dekstah)	4:09
4.	"Winner"	3:33
5.	"Reppin'"	2:24
6.	"High Demand"	3:43
7.	"Move wit' da Rhymes"	3:03
8.	"Telem How"	2:57
9.	"I Look Like Money"	2:23
10.	"Never Be the Same"	3:55
11.	"Tryin'"	2:49
12.	"Take You Back"	3:29
13.	"On a Mission"	3:02
14.	"Swimmin' in da Air"	3:11
15.	"Seen It All"	2:30
16.	"Claimed My Crown"	3:00
17.	"Walk wit' Me"	3:11
18.	"Back Again"	3:19
19.	"Been Some Time"	3:33
20.	"Modern Love"	3:23
21.	"Mmm So Good"	2:58
22.	"Like I'm Trapped"	3:46
23.	"Will I Ever See You Again"	4:08
Total length:		73:21

== Charts ==
=== Weekly charts ===
Weekly chart performance
Chart (2023)	Peak position
Australian Albums (ARIA)	1

=== Year-end charts ===
Year-end chart performance
Chart (2023)	Position
Australian Artist Albums (ARIA)	28
