= List of number-one urban singles of 2023 (Australia) =

ARIA Charts number-one urban singles of 2023 < 2022 2024 >

Other Australian number-one charts of 2023
- albums
- singles
- dance singles
- club tracks
- digital tracks
- streaming tracks

Top Australian singles and albums of 2023
- Triple J Hottest 100
- top 25 singles
- top 25 albums

The ARIA Urban Chart is a chart that ranks the best-performing hip hop and R&B tracks of Australia. It is published by the Australian Recording Industry Association (ARIA), an organisation who collect music data for the weekly ARIA Charts. To be eligible to appear on the chart, the recording must be a single of a predominantly urban nature.

== Chart history ==
Issue date	Song	Artist(s)	Reference
2 January	"Kill Bill"	SZA	
9 January	"Kill Bill"	SZA	
16 January	"Kill Bill"	SZA	
23 January	"Kill Bill"	SZA	
30 January	"Kill Bill"	SZA	
6 February	"Kill Bill"	SZA	
13 February	"Kill Bill"	SZA	
20 February	"Kill Bill"	SZA	
27 February	"Boy's a Liar"	PinkPantheress	
6 March	"Boy's a Liar"	PinkPantheress	
13 March	"Boy's a Liar"	PinkPantheress	
20 March	"Boy's a Liar"	PinkPantheress	
27 March	"Boy's a Liar"	PinkPantheress	
3 April	"Boy's a Liar"	PinkPantheress	
10 April	"Boy's a Liar"	PinkPantheress	
17 April	"Boy's a Liar"	PinkPantheress	
24 April	"Kill Bill"	SZA	
1 May	"Kill Bill"	SZA	
8 May	"Kill Bill"	SZA	
15 May	"Kill Bill"	SZA	
22 May	"Boy's a Liar"	PinkPantheress	
29 May	"Boy's a Liar"	PinkPantheress	
5 June	"Boy's a Liar"	PinkPantheress	
12 June	"Sprinter"	Dave and Central Cee	
19 June	"Sprinter"	Dave and Central Cee	
26 June	"Sprinter"	Dave and Central Cee	
3 July	"Sprinter"	Dave and Central Cee	
10 July	"Sprinter"	Dave and Central Cee	
17 July	"Sprinter"	Dave and Central Cee	
24 July	"Sprinter"	Dave and Central Cee	
31 July	"Sprinter"	Dave and Central Cee	
7 August	"Sprinter"	Dave and Central Cee	
14 August	"Sprinter"	Dave and Central Cee	
21 August	"Sprinter"	Dave and Central Cee	
28 August	"Paint the Town Red"	Doja Cat	
4 September	"Paint the Town Red"	Doja Cat	
11 September	"Paint the Town Red"	Doja Cat	
18 September	"Paint the Town Red"	Doja Cat	
25 September	"Paint the Town Red"	Doja Cat	
2 October	"Paint the Town Red"	Doja Cat	
9 October	"Paint the Town Red"	Doja Cat	
16 October	"Paint the Town Red"	Doja Cat	
23 October	"Paint the Town Red"	Doja Cat	
30 October	"Paint the Town Red"	Doja Cat	
6 November	"Paint the Town Red"	Doja Cat	
13 November	"Paint the Town Red"	Doja Cat	
20 November	"Lovin On Me"	Jack Harlow	
27 November	"Lovin On Me"	Jack Harlow	
4 December	"Lovin On Me"	Jack Harlow	
11 December	"Lovin On Me"	Jack Harlow	
18 December	"Lovin On Me"	Jack Harlow	
25 December	"Lovin On Me"	Jack Harlow	

== See also ==
- 2023 in music
- List of number-one singles of 2023 (Australia)
