= List of number-one dance singles of 2023 (Australia) =

ARIA Charts number-one dance singles of 2023 < 2022 2024 >

Other Australian number-one charts of 2023
- albums
- singles
- urban singles
- club tracks
- digital tracks
- streaming tracks

Top Australian singles and albums of 2023
- Triple J Hottest 100
- top 25 singles
- top 25 albums

The ARIA Dance Chart is a chart that ranks the best-performing dance singles of Australia. It is published by Australian Recording Industry Association (ARIA), an organisation who collect music data for the weekly ARIA Charts. To be eligible to appear on the chart, the recording must be a single, and be "predominantly of a dance nature, or with a featured track of a dance nature, or included in the ARIA Club Chart or a comparable overseas chart".

== Chart history ==
Date	Song	Artist(s)	Ref.
2 January	"I'm Good (Blue)"	David Guetta and Bebe Rexha	
9 January	"I'm Good (Blue)"	David Guetta and Bebe Rexha	
16 January	"I'm Good (Blue)"	David Guetta and Bebe Rexha	
23 January	"I'm Good (Blue)"	David Guetta and Bebe Rexha	
30 January	"I'm Good (Blue)"	David Guetta and Bebe Rexha	
6 February	"Say Nothing"	Flume featuring May-a	
13 February	"I'm Good (Blue)"	David Guetta featuring Bebe Rexha	
20 February	"I'm Good (Blue)"	David Guetta featuring Bebe Rexha	
27 February	"I'm Good (Blue)"	David Guetta featuring Bebe Rexha	
6 March	"I'm Good (Blue)"	David Guetta featuring Bebe Rexha	
13 March	"I'm Good (Blue)"	David Guetta featuring Bebe Rexha	
20 March	"10:35"	Tiësto and Tate McRae	
27 March	"10:35"	Tiësto and Tate McRae	
3 April	"10:35"	Tiësto and Tate McRae	
10 April	"10:35"	Tiësto and Tate McRae	
17 April	"Heat Waves"	Glass Animals	
24 April	"Heat Waves"	Glass Animals	
1 May	"Miracle"	Calvin Harris and Ellie Goulding	
8 May	"Miracle"	Calvin Harris and Ellie Goulding	
15 May	"Miracle"	Calvin Harris and Ellie Goulding	
22 May	"Miracle"	Calvin Harris and Ellie Goulding	
29 May	"Miracle"	Calvin Harris and Ellie Goulding	
5 June	"Miracle"	Calvin Harris and Ellie Goulding	
12 June	"Miracle"	Calvin Harris and Ellie Goulding	
19 June	"Miracle"	Calvin Harris and Ellie Goulding	
26 June	"Miracle"	Calvin Harris and Ellie Goulding	
3 July	"Miracle"	Calvin Harris and Ellie Goulding	
10 July	"Miracle"	Calvin Harris and Ellie Goulding	
17 July	"Miracle"	Calvin Harris and Ellie Goulding	
24 July	"Rush"	Troye Sivan	
31 July	"Rush"	Troye Sivan	
7 August	"Rush"	Troye Sivan	
14 August	"Heat Waves"	Glass Animals	
21 August	"Heat Waves"	Glass Animals	
28 August	"Rush"	Troye Sivan	
4 September	"Prada"	Cassö, Raye and D-Block Europe	
11 September	"Prada"	Cassö, Raye and D-Block Europe	
18 September	"Prada"	Cassö, Raye and D-Block Europe	
25 September	"Strangers"	Kenya Grace	
2 October	"Strangers"	Kenya Grace	
9 October	"Strangers"	Kenya Grace	
16 October	"Strangers"	Kenya Grace	
23 October	"Prada"	Cassö, Raye and D-Block Europe	
30 October	"Prada"	Cassö, Raye and D-Block Europe	
6 November	"Prada"	Cassö, Raye and D-Block Europe	
13 November	"Prada"	Cassö, Raye and D-Block Europe	
20 November	"Prada"	Cassö, Raye and D-Block Europe	
27 November	"Prada"	Cassö, Raye and D-Block Europe	
4 December	"Prada"	Cassö, Raye and D-Block Europe	
11 December	"Prada"	Cassö, Raye and D-Block Europe	
18 December	"Prada"	Cassö, Raye and D-Block Europe	
25 December	"Prada"	Cassö, Raye and D-Block Europe	

== See also ==
- 2023 in music
