= List of artists who reached number one on the UK singles chart =

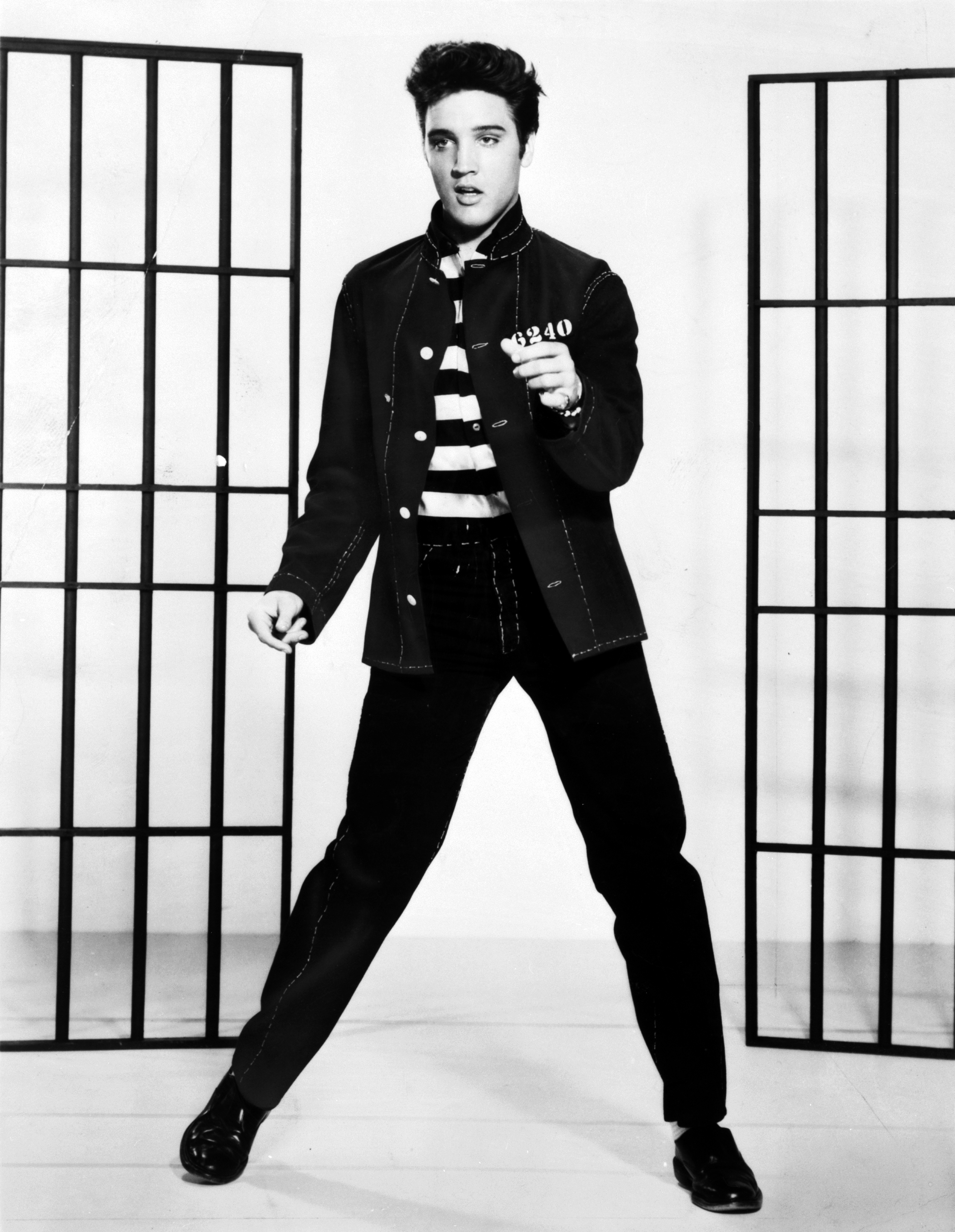
Elvis Presley holds the record for most number one singles.

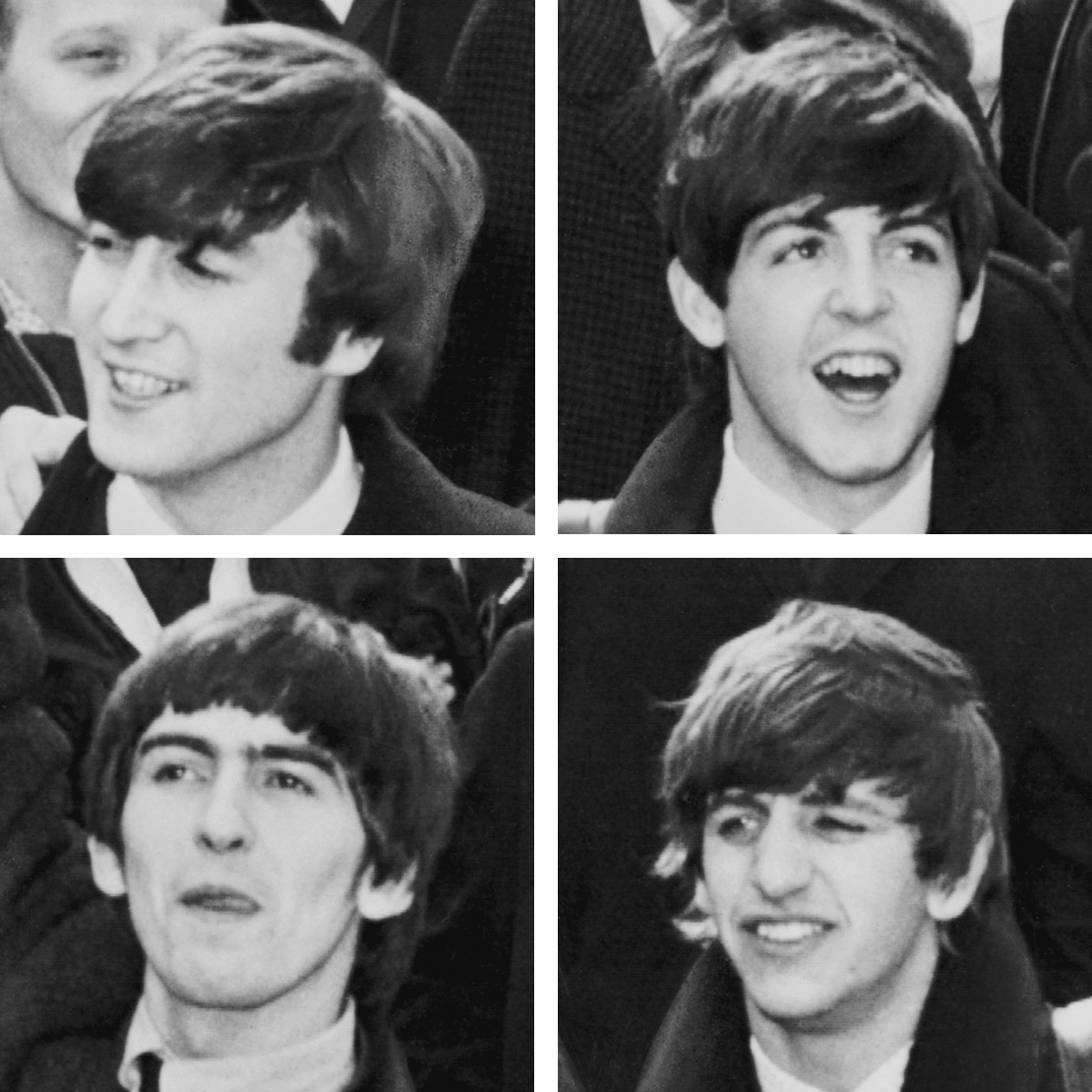
The Beatles have the most number one singles of any group or British act.

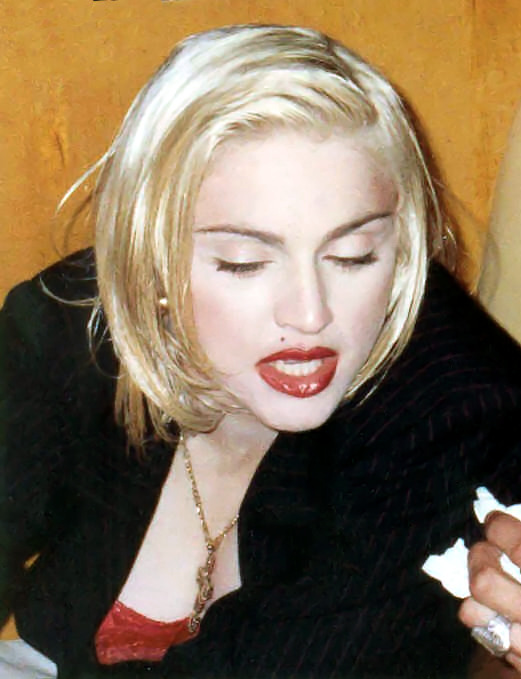
Madonna has the most number one singles of any female artist.

This is a list of artists who have reached number one on the UK singles chart as recorded by the Official Charts Company since November 1952.

- Artists are listed alphabetically.
- Solo artists are listed by surname and groups are listed by full names excluding "the" or any foreign translations of "the".
- Artists are credited separately if more than one artist is credited on a song (e.g. John Travolta and Olivia Newton-John each get separate credits for their duets from Grease).
- Artists who performed on a song but are not credited individually are not included, although notable cases may be recorded in the Notes column. Featured artists are listed if they are specifically credited on the single's cover.
- Artists who appear as part of a group who reached number one are not individually mentioned unless they have scored a solo number one (e.g. Paul McCartney's number one singles with The Beatles and Wings are not counted as his own, only those credited to himself are counted).

== 0–9 ==
Artist	Country	Number-one single(s)	Year	Weeks at #1	Notes
10cc	England	"Rubber Bullets"	1973	1	
10cc	England	"I'm Not in Love"	1975	2	
10cc	England	"Dreadlock Holiday"	1978	1	
112	United States	"I'll Be Missing You"	1997	6	Puff Daddy and Faith Evans featuring 112
2 Chainz	United States	"Talk Dirty"	2013	2	Jason Derulo featuring 2 Chainz
2Pac	United States	"Ghetto Gospel"	2005	3	2Pac featuring Elton John, posthumous number one
2 Unlimited	Belgium / Netherlands	"No Limit"	1993	5	
21 Savage	England	"Rockstar"	2017	4	Post Malone featuring 21 Savage
220 Kid	England	"Wellerman"	2021	2	Nathan Evans, 220 Kid and Billen Ted
24kGoldn	United States	"Mood"	2020	4	24kGoldn featuring Iann Dior
3 of a Kind	England	"Baby Cakes"	2004	1	
5 Seconds of Summer	Australia	"She Looks So Perfect"	2014	1	
070 Shake	United States	"Escapism"	2023	1	Raye featuring 070 Shake
911	England	"A Little Bit More"	1999	1	

== A ==
Back to top

Artist	Country	Number-one single(s)	Year	Weeks at #1	Notes
A1	England / Norway	"Take On Me"	2000	1	
A1	England / Norway	"Same Old Brand New You"	2000	1	
Aaliyah	United States	"More Than a Woman"	2002	1	Posthumous number one
ABBA	Sweden	"Waterloo"	1974	2	
ABBA	Sweden	"Mamma Mia"	1976	2	
ABBA	Sweden	"Fernando"	1976	4	
ABBA	Sweden	"Dancing Queen"	1976	6	
ABBA	Sweden	"Knowing Me, Knowing You"	1977	5	
ABBA	Sweden	"The Name of the Game"	1977	4	
ABBA	Sweden	"Take a Chance on Me"	1978	3	
ABBA	Sweden	"The Winner Takes It All"	1980	2	
ABBA	Sweden	"Super Trouper"	1980	3	
Gracie Abrams	United States	"That's So True"	2024	8	
Ace of Base	Sweden	"All That She Wants"	1993	3	
Adam and the Ants	England	"Stand and Deliver"	1981	5	
Adam and the Ants	England	"Prince Charming"	1981	4	
Bryan Adams	Canada	"(Everything I Do) I Do It for You"	1991	16	Biggest selling single of 1991
Bryan Adams	Canada	"Don't Give Up"	2000	1	Chicane featuring Bryan Adams
Adamski	England	"Killer"	1990	4	Features uncredited vocals from Seal.
Adassa	United States	"We Don't Talk About Bruno"	2022	7	Carolina Gaitán, Mauro Castillo, Adassa, Rhenzy Feliz, Diane Guerrero and Stephanie Beatriz
Adele	England	"Someone Like You"	2011	5	Biggest selling single of 2011
Adele	England	"Hello"	2015	3	
Adele	England	"Easy on Me"	2021	8	
Afrojack	Netherlands	"Give Me Everything"	2011	3	Pitbull featuring Ne-Yo, Afrojack and Nayer
Afroman	United States	"Because I Got High"	2001	3	
Christina Aguilera	United States	"Genie in a Bottle"	1999	2	
Christina Aguilera	United States	"Lady Marmalade"	2001	1	Christina Aguilera, Lil' Kim, Mýa and Pink, 900th number one
Christina Aguilera	United States	"Dirrty"	2002	2	Christina Aguilera featuring Redman
Christina Aguilera	United States	"Beautiful"	2003	2	
A-ha	Norway	"The Sun Always Shines on T.V."	1986	2	
Akon	Senegal / United States	"Lonely"	2005	2	
Akon	Senegal / United States	"Smack That"	2006	1	Akon featuring Eminem
Akon	Senegal / United States	"Sexy Bitch"	2009	1	David Guetta featuring Akon
Alesso	Sweden	"Under Control"	2013	1	Calvin Harris and Alesso featuring Hurts
Alice Cooper	United States	"School's Out"	1972	3	
All Saints	England / Canada	"Never Ever"	1998	1	
All Saints	England / Canada	"Under the Bridge" / "Lady Marmalade"	1998	2	
All Saints	England / Canada	"Bootie Call"	1998	1	800th number one
All Saints	England / Canada	"Pure Shores"	2000	2	
All Saints	England / Canada	"Black Coffee"	2000	1	
Lily Allen	England	"Smile"	2006	2	
Lily Allen	England	"The Fear"	2009	4	
Lily Allen	England	"Somewhere Only We Know"	2013	3	
Marc Almond	England	"Something's Gotten Hold of My Heart"	1989	4	Marc Almond featuring Gene Pitney, has another number one with Soft Cell
Althea & Donna	Jamaica	"Uptown Top Ranking"	1978	1	
A*M*E	England	"Need U (100%)"	2013	2	Duke Dumont featuring A*M*E
Amen Corner	Wales	"(If Paradise Is) Half as Nice"	1969	2	
Tori Amos	United States	"Professional Widow"	1997	1	Remixed by Armand van Helden
Peter Andre	England / Australia	"Flava"	1996	1	
Peter Andre	England / Australia	"I Feel You"	1996	1	
Peter Andre	England / Australia	"Mysterious Girl"	2004	1	Peter Andre featuring Bubbler Ranx
Michael Andrews	United States	"Mad World"	2003	3	Michael Andrews featuring Gary Jules, 2003's Christmas number one
Aneka	Scotland	"Japanese Boy"	1981	1	
The Animals	England	"The House of the Rising Sun"	1964	1	
Paul Anka	Canada	"Diana"	1957	9	Biggest selling single of 1957
Anne-Marie	England	"Rockabye"	2016	9	Clean Bandit featuring Sean Paul and Anne-Marie
Another Level	England	"Freak Me"	1998	1	
Adam Ant	England	"Goody Two Shoes"	1982	2	Has other number one singles with Adam and the Ants
Ant & Dec	England	"Let's Get Ready to Rhumble"	2013	1	PJ & Duncan
Gabrielle Aplin	England	"The Power of Love"	2012	1	
Aqua	Denmark / Norway	"Barbie Girl"	1997	4	
Aqua	Denmark / Norway	"Doctor Jones"	1998	2	
Aqua	Denmark / Norway	"Turn Back Time"	1998	1	
Tasmin Archer	England	"Sleeping Satellite"	1992	2	
The Archies	United States	"Sugar, Sugar"	1969	8	Biggest selling single of 1969
Arctic Monkeys	England	"I Bet You Look Good on the Dancefloor"	2005	1	
Arctic Monkeys	England	"When the Sun Goes Down"	2006	1	
Louis Armstrong	United States	"What a Wonderful World"	1968	4	
James Arthur	England	"Impossible"	2012	3	
James Arthur	England	"Say You Won't Let Go"	2016	3	
Artists for Grenfell		"Bridge over Troubled Water"	2017	1	
Ashanti	United States	"Wonderful"	2004	1	Ja Rule featuring R. Kelly and Ashanti
Rick Astley	England	"Never Gonna Give You Up"	1987	5	Biggest selling single of 1987
Aswad	England	"Don't Turn Around"	1988	2	
ATB	Germany	"9 PM (Till I Come)"	1999	2	
Atomic Kitten	England	"Whole Again"	2001	4	
Atomic Kitten	England	"Eternal Flame"	2001	2	
Atomic Kitten	England	"The Tide Is High (Get the Feeling)"	2002	3	
Winifred Atwell	Trinidad and Tobago	"Let's Have Another Party"	1954	5	1954's Christmas number one
Winifred Atwell	Trinidad and Tobago	"The Poor People of Paris"	1956	3	
Avicii	Sweden	"I Could Be the One"	2013	1	Avicii vs. Nicky Romero
Avicii	Sweden	"Wake Me Up"	2013	3	
Iggy Azalea	Australia	"Problem"	2014	1	Ariana Grande featuring Iggy Azalea
Charles Aznavour	France / Armenia	"She"	1974	4	

== B ==
Back to top

Artist	Country	Number-one single(s)	Year	Weeks at #1	Notes
Cardi B	United States	"WAP"	2020	3	Cardi B featuring Megan Thee Stallion
Katy B	England	"Turn the Music Louder (Rumble)"	2015	1	KDA featuring Tinie Tempah and Katy B
Mel B	England	"I Want You Back"	1998	1	Melanie B featuring Missy Elliott, has more number one singles with the Spice Girls
Baby D	England	"Let Me Be Your Fantasy"	1994	2	
Babylon Zoo	England	"Spaceman"	1996	5	
Baccara	Spain	"Yes Sir, I Can Boogie"	1977	1	
The Bachelors	Ireland	"Diane"	1964	1	
Backstreet Boys	United States	"I Want It That Way"	1999	1	
David Baddiel	England	"Three Lions"	1996	3	Baddiel, Skinner and The Lightning Seeds
David Baddiel	England	"3 Lions '98'"	1998	3	Baddiel, Skinner and The Lightning Seeds
Philip Bailey	United States	"Easy Lover"	1985	4	Philip Bailey and Phil Collins
Sam Bailey	England	"Skyscraper"	2013	1	2013's Christmas number one
Long John Baldry	England	"Let the Heartaches Begin"	1967	2	
Michael Ball	England	"You'll Never Walk Alone"	2020	1	Michael Ball and Captain Tom Moore
Band Aid		"Do They Know It's Christmas?"	1984	5	Biggest selling single of 1984 and the 1980s decade, 1984's Christmas number one
Band Aid II		"Do They Know It's Christmas?"	1989	3	1989's Christmas number one
Band Aid 20		"Do They Know It's Christmas?"	2004	4	2004's biggest selling single and Christmas number one
Band Aid 30		"Do They Know It's Christmas?"	2014	1	
The Bangles	United States	"Eternal Flame"	1989	4	
Pato Banton	England	"Baby Come Back"	1994	4	Pato Banton featuring Ali and Robin Campbell
Gary Barlow	England	"Forever Love"	1996	1	Has more number ones with Take That
Gary Barlow	England	"Love Won't Wait"	1997	1	Has more number ones with Take That
Gary Barlow	England	"Sing"	2012	1	Gary Barlow and the Commonwealth Band
J.J. Barrie	Canada	"No Charge"	1976	1	
Shirley Bassey	Wales	"As I Love You"	1959	4	
Shirley Bassey	Wales	"Reach for the Stars" / "Climb Ev'ry Mountain"	1961	1	
Basshunter	Sweden	"Now You're Gone"	2008	5	Basshunter featuring DJ Mental Theo's Bazzheadz
Bay City Rollers	Scotland	"Bye Bye Baby"	1975	6	Biggest selling single of 1975
Bay City Rollers	Scotland	"Give a Little Love"	1975	3	
The Beach Boys	United States	"Good Vibrations"	1966	2	
The Beach Boys	United States	"Do It Again"	1968	1	
The Beatles	England	"From Me to You"	1963	7	
The Beatles	England	"She Loves You"	1963	6	Biggest selling single of 1963 and the 1960s decade
The Beatles	England	"I Want to Hold Your Hand"	1963	5	1963's Christmas number one
The Beatles	England	"Can't Buy Me Love"	1964	3	Biggest selling single of 1964
The Beatles	England	"A Hard Day's Night"	1964	3	
The Beatles	England	"I Feel Fine"	1964	5	1964's Christmas number one
The Beatles	England	"Ticket to Ride"	1965	3	
The Beatles	England	"Help!"	1965	3	200th number one single
The Beatles	England	"Day Tripper" / "We Can Work It Out"	1965	5	1965's Christmas number one
The Beatles	England	"Paperback Writer"	1966	2	
The Beatles	England	"Yellow Submarine" / "Eleanor Rigby"	1966	4	
The Beatles	England	"All You Need Is Love"	1967	3	
The Beatles	England	"Hello, Goodbye"	1967	7	1967's Christmas number one
The Beatles	England	"Lady Madonna"	1968	2	
The Beatles	England	"Hey Jude"	1968	2	Biggest selling single of 1968
The Beatles	England	"Get Back"	1969	6	The Beatles with Billy Preston
The Beatles	England	"The Ballad of John and Yoko"	1969	4	
The Beatles	England	"Now and Then"	2023	1	
Stephanie Beatriz	United States	"We Don't Talk About Bruno"	2022	7	Carolina Gaitán, Mauro Castillo, Adassa, Rhenzy Feliz, Diane Guerrero and Stephanie Beatriz
Beats International	England	"Dub Be Good to Me"	1990	4	
The Beautiful South	England	"A Little Time"	1990	1	
Robin Beck	United States	"First Time"	1988	3	
Daniel Bedingfield	New Zealand / England	"Gotta Get Thru This"	2001	3	Also provides uncredited vocals on "I Wanna Feel" by Secondcity
Daniel Bedingfield	New Zealand / England	"If You're Not The One"	2002	1	Also provides uncredited vocals on "I Wanna Feel" by Secondcity
Daniel Bedingfield	New Zealand / England	"Never Gonna Leave Your Side"	2003	1	Also provides uncredited vocals on "I Wanna Feel" by Secondcity
Natasha Bedingfield	England	"These Words"	2004	2	
Bee Gees	England	"Massachusetts"	1967	4	
Bee Gees	England	"I've Gotta Get a Message to You"	1968	1	
Bee Gees	England	"Night Fever"	1978	2	
Bee Gees	England	"Tragedy"	1979	2	
Bee Gees	England	"You Win Again"	1987	4	
Lou Bega	Germany	"Mambo No. 5 (A Little Bit Of...)"	1999	2	
Harry Belafonte	United States	"Mary's Boy Child"	1957	7	1957's Christmas number one
Lauren Bennett	England	"Party Rock Anthem"	2011	4	LMFAO featuring Lauren Bennett and GoonRock
Tony Bennett	United States	"Stranger in Paradise"	1955	2	
Berlin	United States	"Take My Breath Away"	1986	4	
Amelle Berrabah	England	"Never Leave You"	2009	1	Tinchy Stryder featuring Amelle Berrabah, has other number ones with Sugababes
Chuck Berry	United States	"My Ding-a-Ling"	1972	4	
Nick Berry	England	"Every Loser Wins"	1986	3	
Beyoncé	United States	"Crazy in Love"	2003	3	Beyoncé featuring Jay-Z
Beyoncé	United States	"Déjà Vu"	2006	1	Beyoncé featuring Jay-Z
Beyoncé	United States	"Beautiful Liar"	2007	3	Beyoncé and Shakira, remixed by Freemasons
Beyoncé	United States	"If I Were a Boy"	2008	1	Has more number ones with Destiny's Child
Beyoncé	United States	"Telephone"	2010	2	Lady Gaga featuring Beyoncé
Beyoncé	United States	"Texas Hold 'Em"	2024	5	
Justin Bieber	Canada	"What Do You Mean?"	2015	5	
Justin Bieber	Canada	"Sorry"	2015	2	
Justin Bieber	Canada	"Love Yourself"	2015	6	
Justin Bieber	Canada	"Cold Water"	2016	5	Major Lazer featuring Justin Bieber and MØ
Justin Bieber	Canada	"I'm the One"	2017	1	DJ Khaled featuring Justin Bieber, Quavo, Chance the Rapper and Lil Wayne
Justin Bieber	Canada	"Despacito"	2017	11	Luis Fonsi and Daddy Yankee featuring Justin Bieber
Justin Bieber	Canada	"I Don't Care"	2019	8	Ed Sheeran and Justin Bieber
Justin Bieber	Canada	"Daisies"	2025	1	
Big Sean	United States	"Feels"	2017	1	Calvin Harris featuring Pharrell Williams, Katy Perry and Big Sean
Billen Ted	England	"Wellerman"	2021	2	Nathan Evans, 220 Kid and Billen Ted
Bingo Players	Netherlands	"Get Up (Rattle)"	2013	2	Bingo Players featuring Far East Movement
Jane Birkin	England	"Je t'aime... moi non plus"	1969	1	Serge Gainsbourg and Jane Birkin
Aloe Blacc	United States	"The Man"	2014	1	Also provides uncredited vocals on "Wake Me Up" by Avicii
Cilla Black	England	"Anyone Who Had a Heart"	1964	3	
Cilla Black	England	"You're My World"	1964	4	
Black Box	Italy	"Ride on Time"	1989	6	Biggest selling single of 1989
Black Eyed Peas	United States	"Where Is the Love?"	2003	6	Biggest selling single of 2003
Black Eyed Peas	United States	"Boom Boom Pow"	2009	2	
Black Eyed Peas	United States	"I Gotta Feeling"	2009	2	
Black Eyed Peas	United States	Meet Me Halfway"	2009	1	
Black Eyed Peas	United States	"The Time (Dirty Bit)"	2010	1	
Black Legend	Italy	"You See the Trouble with Me"	2000	1	
Benny Blanco	United States	"Eastside"	2018	1	Benny Blanco, Halsey and Khalid
Blazin' Squad	England	"Crossroads"	2002	1	
Mr Blobby	England	"Mr Blobby"	1993	3	1993's Christmas number one
Blondie	United States	"Heart of Glass"	1979	4	
Blondie	United States	"Sunday Girl"	1979	3	
Blondie	United States	"Atomic"	1980	2	
Blondie	United States	"Call Me"	1980	1	
Blondie	United States	"The Tide Is High"	1980	2	
Blondie	United States	"Maria"	1999	1	
Blue	England	"Too Close"	2001	1	
Blue	England	"If You Come Back"	2001	1	
Blue	England	"Sorry Seems to Be the Hardest Word"	2002	1	Blue featuring Elton John
The Bluebells	Scotland	"Young at Heart"	1993	4	
James Blunt	England	"You're Beautiful"	2005	5	
Blur	England	"Country House"	1995	2	Famously won the Battle of Britpop against "Roll With It" by Oasis
Blur	England	"Beetlebum"	1997	1	
B.o.B	United States	"Nothin' on You"	2010	1	B.o.B featuring Bruno Mars
B.o.B	United States	"Airplanes"	2010	1	B.o.B featuring Hayley Williams
B.o.B	United States	"Price Tag"	2011	2	Jessie J featuring B.o.B
Bob the Builder	England	"Can We Fix It?"	2000	3	2000's Christmas number one and biggest selling single
Bob the Builder	England	"Mambo No. 5"	2001	1	
Bombalurina	England	"Itsy Bitsy Teenie Weenie Yellow Polka Dot Bikini"	1990	3	
Boney M.	Germany	"Rivers of Babylon" / "Brown Girl in the Ring"	1978	5	Biggest selling single of 1978
Boney M.	Germany	"Mary's Boy Child – Oh My Lord"	1978	4	1978's Christmas number one
The Boomtown Rats	Ireland	"Rat Trap"	1978	2	
The Boomtown Rats	Ireland	"I Don't Like Mondays"	1979	4	
Benson Boone	United States	"Beautiful Things"	2024	2	
Pat Boone	United States	"I'll Be Home"	1956	5	Biggest selling single of 1956
Ken Boothe	Jamaica	"Everything I Own"	1974	3	
Borgeous	United States	"Tsunami (Jump)"	2014	1	Dvbbs and Borgeous featuring Tinie Tempah
David Bowie	England	"Space Oddity"	1975	2	
David Bowie	England	"Ashes to Ashes"	1980	2	
David Bowie	England	"Under Pressure"	1981	2	Queen and David Bowie
David Bowie	England	"Let's Dance"	1983	3	
David Bowie	England	"Dancing in the Street"	1985	4	David Bowie and Mick Jagger
Boy George	England	"Everything I Own"	1987	2	Has more number ones with Culture Club
Boyz II Men	United States	"End of the Road"	1992	3	
Boyzone	Ireland	"Words"	1996	1	
Boyzone	Ireland	"A Different Beat"	1996	1	
Boyzone	Ireland	"All That I Need"	1998	1	
Boyzone	Ireland	"No Matter What"	1998	3	
Boyzone	Ireland	"When the Going Gets Tough"	1999	2	
Boyzone	Ireland	"You Needed Me"	1999	1	
Billy Bragg	England	"She's Leaving Home"	1988	4	Billy Bragg featuring Cara Tivey, double A-side with "With a Little Help from My Friends" by Wet Wet Wet
Brian and Michael	England	"Matchstalk Men and Matchstalk Cats and Dogs"	1978	3	
Steve Brookstein	England	"Against All Odds"	2005	1	
Bros	England	"I Owe You Nothing"	1988	2	
Brotherhood of Man	England	"Save Your Kisses for Me"	1976	6	Biggest selling single of 1976
Brotherhood of Man	England	"Angelo"	1977	1	
Brotherhood of Man	England	"Figaro"	1978	1	
Chris Brown	United States	"Turn Up the Music"	2012	1	
Chris Brown	United States	"Freaky Friday"	2018	1	Lil Dicky featuring Chris Brown
Rob Brydon	Wales	"(Barry) Islands in the Stream"	2009	1	Vanessa Jenkins and Bryn West featuring Tom Jones and Robin Gibb
Bubbler Ranx	Jamaica	"Mysterious Girl"	2004	1	Peter Andre featuring Bubbler Ranx
Bucks Fizz	England	"Making Your Mind Up"	1981	3	
Bucks Fizz	England	"The Land of Make Believe"	1982	2	
Bucks Fizz	England	"My Camera Never Lies"	1982	1	
The Buggles	England	"Video Killed the Radio Star"	1979	1	
B. Bumble and the Stingers	United States	"Nut Rocker"	1962	1	
Emma Bunton	England	"What Took You So Long?"	2001	2	Has more number one singles with Spice Girls
Alexandra Burke	England	"Hallelujah"	2008	3	2008's Christmas number one and biggest selling single
Alexandra Burke	England	"Bad Boys"	2009	1	Alexandra Burke featuring Flo Rida
Alexandra Burke	England	"Start Without You"	2010	2	Alexandra Burke featuring Laza Morgan
Burna Boy	Nigeria	"Own It"	2020	3	Stormzy featuring Ed Sheeran and Burna Boy
Kate Bush	England	"Wuthering Heights"	1978	4	
Kate Bush	England	"Running Up That Hill"	2022	3	
Busted	England	"You Said No"	2003	1	
Busted	England	"Crashed the Wedding"	2003	1	
Busted	England	"Who's David"	2004	1	
Busted	England	"Thunderbirds" / "3AM"	2004	2	
B*Witched	Ireland	"C'est la Vie"	1998	2	
B*Witched	Ireland	"Rollercoaster"	1998	2	
B*Witched	Ireland	"To You I Belong"	1998	1	
B*Witched	Ireland	"Blame It on the Weatherman"	1999	1	
The Byrds	United States	"Mr. Tambourine Man"	1965	2	

== C ==
Back to top

Artist	Country	Number-one single(s)	Year	Weeks at #1	Notes
Melanie C	England	"Never Be the Same Again"	2000	1	Melanie C featuring Lisa "Left Eye" Lopes
Melanie C	England	"I Turn to You"	2000	1	Remixed by Hex Hector, has more number ones with the Spice Girls
Camila Cabello	Cuba / United States	"Havana"	2017	5	Camila Cabello featuring Young Thug
Camila Cabello	Cuba / United States	"Señorita"	2019	6	Shawn Mendes and Camila Cabello
Eddie Calvert	England	"Oh Mein Papa"	1954	9	
Eddie Calvert	England	"Cherry Pink (and Apple Blossom White)"	1955	4	
Ali and Robin Campbell	England	"Baby Come Back"	1994	4	Pato Banton featuring Ali and Robin Campbell, have other number ones with UB40
Blu Cantrell	United States	"Breathe"	2003	4	Blu Cantrell featuring Sean Paul
Lewis Capaldi	Scotland	"Someone You Loved"	2019	7	Biggest selling single of 2019
Lewis Capaldi	Scotland	"Before You Go"	2020	1	
Lewis Capaldi	Scotland	"Forget Me"	2022	1	
Lewis Capaldi	Scotland	"Pointless"	2023	1	
Lewis Capaldi	Scotland	"Wish You the Best"	2023	1	
Lewis Capaldi	Scotland	"Survive"	2025	1	
Dan Caplen	England	"These Days"	2018	1	Rudimental featuring Jess Glynne, Macklemore and Dan Caplen
Irene Cara	United States	"Fame"	1982	3	
Matt Cardle	England	"When We Collide"	2010	3	2010's Christmas number one
Mariah Carey	United States	"Without You"	1994	4	
Mariah Carey	United States	"Against All Odds"	2000	2	Mariah Carey featuring Westlife
Mariah Carey	United States	"All I Want for Christmas Is You"	2020	3	
Belinda Carlisle	United States	"Heaven Is a Place on Earth"	1988	2	
Sabrina Carpenter	United States	"Espresso"	2024	7	
Sabrina Carpenter	United States	"Please Please Please"	2024	5	
Sabrina Carpenter	United States	"Taste"	2024	9	
Sabrina Carpenter	United States	"Manchild"	2025	2	
Cascada	Germany	"Evacuate the Dancefloor"	2009	2	1100th number one
DJ Casper	United States	"Cha Cha Slide"	2004	1	
David Cassidy	United States	"How Can I Be Sure"	1972	2	
David Cassidy	United States	"Daydreamer" / "The Puppy Song"	1973	3	
Eva Cassidy	United States	"What a Wonderful World"	2007	1	Eva Cassidy and Katie Melua, posthumous number one
Mauro Castillo	Colombia	"We Don't Talk About Bruno"	2022	7	Carolina Gaitán, Mauro Castillo, Adassa, Rhenzy Feliz, Diane Guerrero and Stephanie Beatriz
Central Cee	England	"Sprinter"	2023	10	Dave and Central Cee
The Chainsmokers	United States	"Closer"	2016	4	The Chainsmokers featuring Halsey
Chance the Rapper	United States	"I'm the One"	2017	1	DJ Khaled featuring Justin Bieber, Quavo, Chance the Rapper and Lil Wayne
Charlene	United States	"I've Never Been to Me"	1982	1	
Ray Charles	United States	"I Can't Stop Loving You"	1962	2	
Tina Charles	England	"I Love to Love (But My Baby Loves to Dance)"	1976	3	
Charles & Eddie	United States	"Would I Lie to You?"	1992	2	
Chase & Status	England	"Backbone"	2024	2	Chase & Status and Stormzy
Oliver Cheatham	United States	"Make Luv"	2003	4	Room 5 featuring Oliver Cheatham
Chef	United States	"Chocolate Salty Balls (P.S. I Love You)"	1998	1	Character from the cartoon South Park, voiced by Isaac Hayes
The Chemical Brothers	England	"Setting Sun"	1996	1	Features uncredited vocals from Noel Gallagher
The Chemical Brothers	England	"Block Rockin' Beats"	1997	1	
Cher	United States	"The Shoop Shoop Song (It's in His Kiss)"	1991	5	Has another number one as part of Sonny & Cher
Cher	United States	"Love Can Build a Bridge"	1995	1	Cher, Chrissie Hynde and Neneh Cherry with Eric Clapton
Cher	United States	"Believe"	1998	7	Biggest selling single of 1998
Neneh Cherry	Sweden	"Love Can Build a Bridge"	1995	1	Cher, Chrissie Hynde and Neneh Cherry with Eric Clapton
Cheryl	England	"Fight for This Love"	2009	2	Cheryl Cole
Cheryl	England	"Promise This"	2010	1	Cheryl Cole
Cheryl	England	"Call My Name"	2012	1	Has more number ones with Girls Aloud
Cheryl	England	"Crazy Stupid Love"	2014	1	Cheryl featuring Tinie Tempah
Cheryl	England	"I Don't Care"	2014	1	
Chicago	United States	"If You Leave Me Now"	1976	3	
Chicane	England	"Don't Give Up"	2000	1	Chicane featuring Bryan Adams
Chico	Wales	"It's Chico Time"	2006	2	
Chicory Tip	England	"Son of My Father"	1972	3	
Chipmunk	England	"Oopsy Daisy"	2009	1	Chipmunk
The Christians	England	"Ferry 'Cross the Mersey"	1989	3	Gerry Marsden, Paul McCartney, Holly Johnson, The Christians and Stock Aitken Waterman
Christie	England	"Yellow River"	1970	1	
Tony Christie	England	"(Is This the Way to) Amarillo"	2005	7	Tony Christie featuring Peter Kay, biggest selling single of 2005
Chrome	England	"Dance wiv Me"	2008	4	Dizzee Rascal featuring Calvin Harris and Chrome
Chrome	England	"Holiday"	2009	1	Dizzee Rascal featuring Chrome
Chrystal	England	"Dior"	2025	2	MK featuring Chrystal
Ciara	United States	"Goodies"	2005	1	Ciara featuring Petey Pablo
Eric Clapton	England	"Love Can Build a Bridge"	1995	1	Cher, Chrissie Hynde and Neneh Cherry with Eric Clapton
The Dave Clark Five	England	"Glad All Over"	1964	2	
Petula Clark	England	"Sailor"	1961	1	
Petula Clark	England	"This Is My Song"	1967	2	
Kelly Clarkson	United States	"My Life Would Suck Without You"	2009	1	
The Clash	England	"Should I Stay or Should I Go"	1991	2	
Clean Bandit	England	"Rather Be"	2014	4	Clean Bandit featuring Jess Glynne
Clean Bandit	England	"Rockabye"	2016	9	Clean Bandit featuring Sean Paul and Anne-Marie, 2016's Christmas number one
Clean Bandit	England	"Symphony"	2017	1	Clean Bandit featuring Zara Larsson
Clean Bandit	England	"Solo"	2018	1	Clean Bandit featuring Demi Lovato
Rosemary Clooney	United States	"This Ole House"	1954	1	
Rosemary Clooney	United States	"Mambo Italiano"	1955	3	
Eddie Cochran	United States	"Three Steps to Heaven"	1960	2	Posthumous number one
Joe Cocker	England	"With a Little Help from My Friends"	1968	1	
Alma Cogan	England	"Dreamboat"	1955	2	
Coldplay	England	"Viva la Vida"	2008	1	
Coldplay	England	"Paradise"	2012	1	
Dave and Ansell Collins	Jamaica	"Double Barrel"	1971	2	
Phil Collins	England	"You Can't Hurry Love"	1983	2	
Phil Collins	England	"Easy Lover"	1985	4	Philip Bailey and Phil Collins
Phil Collins	England	"A Groovy Kind of Love"	1988	2	
Color Me Badd	United States	"I Wanna Sex You Up"	1991	3	
Commodores	United States	"Three Times a Lady"	1978	5	
The Communards	England	"Don't Leave Me This Way"	1986	4	The Communards featuring Sarah Jane Morris, biggest selling single of 1986
Perry Como	United States	"Don't Let the Stars Get in Your Eyes"	1953	5	
Perry Como	United States	"Magic Moments"	1958	8	
Billy Connolly	Scotland	"D.I.V.O.R.C.E."	1975	1	
Russ Conway	England	"Side Saddle"	1959	4	
Russ Conway	England	"Roulette"	1959	2	
Coolio	United States	"Gangsta's Paradise"	1995	2	Coolio featuring L.V.
Bradley Cooper	United States	"Shallow"	2018	2	Lady Gaga and Bradley Cooper
James Corden	England	"Shout"	2010	2	Shout for England featuring Dizzee Rascal and James Corden
Don Cornell	United States	"Hold My Hand"	1954	5	
Cornershop	England	"Brimful of Asha"	1998	1	Remixed by Fatboy Slim
The Corrs	Ireland	"Breathless"	2000	1	
Joel Corry	England	"Head & Heart"	2020	6	Joel Corry and MNEK
Cover Drive	Barbados	"Twilight"	2012	1	
Julie Covington	England	"Don't Cry for Me Argentina"	1977	1	400th number one
Floyd Cramer	United States	"On the Rebound"	1961	1	
Crazy Frog	Sweden	"Axel F"	2005	4	
The Crazy World of Arthur Brown	England	"Fire"	1968	1	
Creedence Clearwater Revival	United States	"Bad Moon Rising"	1969	3	
The Crickets	United States	"That'll Be the Day"	1957	3	
The Crowd		"You'll Never Walk Alone"	1985	2	
Taio Cruz	England	"Break Your Heart"	2009	3	
Taio Cruz	England	"Dynamite"	2010	1	
Culture Beat	Germany	"Mr. Vain"	1993	4	
Culture Club	England	"Do You Really Want to Hurt Me"	1982	3	
Culture Club	England	"Karma Chameleon"	1983	6	Biggest selling single of 1983
Miley Cyrus	United States	"We Can't Stop"	2013	1	
Miley Cyrus	United States	"Wrecking Ball"	2013	1	
Miley Cyrus	United States	"Flowers"	2023	10	Biggest selling single of 2023

== D ==
Back to top

Artist	Country	Number-one single(s)	Year	Weeks at #1	Notes
Ms D	England	"Heatwave"	2012	2	Wiley featuring Ms D, also provides uncredited vocals on Chip's "Oopsy Daisy"
Rui da Silva	Portugal	"Touch Me"	2001	1	Rui da Silva featuring Cassandra
DaBaby	United States	"Rockstar"	2020	6	DaBaby featuring Roddy Ricch
Daft Punk	France	"Get Lucky"	2013	4	Daft Punk featuring Pharrell Williams and Nile Rodgers
Vic Damone	United States	"On the Street Where You Live"	1958	2	
Dana	Ireland	"All Kinds of Everything"	1970	2	
Dappy	England	"No Regrets"	2011	1	Has another number one with N-Dubz
Bobby Darin	United States	"Dream Lover"	1959	4	
Bobby Darin	United States	"Mack the Knife"	1959	2	
Darius	Scotland	"Colourblind"	2002	2	
Dave	England	"Funky Friday"	2018	1	Dave featuring Fredo
Dave	England	"Starlight"	2022	4	
Dave	England	"Sprinter"	2023	10	Dave and Central Cee
Dave	England	"Raindance"	2026	2	Dave and Tems
Craig David	England	"Fill Me In"	2000	1	
Craig David	England	"7 Days"	2000	1	
Windsor Davies	England	"Whispering Grass"	1975	3	Windsor Davies and Don Estelle
The Spencer Davis Group	England	"Keep On Running"	1966	1	
The Spencer Davis Group	England	"Somebody Help Me"	1966	2	
Doris Day	United States	"Secret Love"	1954	9	Biggest selling single of 1954
Doris Day	United States	"Que Sera, Sera (Whatever Will Be, Will Be)"	1956	6	
DCUP	Australia	"We No Speak Americano"	2010	1	Yolanda Be Cool and DCUP
Chris de Burgh	England	"The Lady in Red"	1986	3	
Dead or Alive	England	"You Spin Me Round (Like a Record)"	1985	2	
Olivia Dean	England	"Man I Need"	2025	1	
Olivia Dean	England	"Rein Me In"	2026	23	Sam Fender and Olivia Dean
Dave Dee, Dozy, Beaky, Mick & Tich	England	"The Legend of Xanadu"	1968	1	
Kiki Dee	England	"Don't Go Breaking My Heart"	1976	6	Elton John and Kiki Dee
Deep Blue Something	United States	"Breakfast at Tiffany's"	1996	1	
Desmond Dekker	Jamaica	"Israelites"	1969	1	Desmond Dekker and The Aces
Chaka Demus & Pliers	Jamaica	"Twist and Shout"	1994	2	700th number one single
John Denver	United States	"Annie's Song"	1974	1	
Jason Derulo	United States	"In My Head"	2010	1	
Jason Derulo	United States	"Don't Wanna Go Home"	2011	2	
Jason Derulo	United States	"Talk Dirty"	2013	2	Jason Derulo featuring 2 Chainz
Jason Derulo	United States	"Want to Want Me"	2015	4	
Jason Derulo	United States	"Savage Love (Laxed – Siren Beat)"	2020	3	Jawsh 685 and Jason Derulo
Destiny's Child	United States	"Independent Women Part I"	2000	1	
Destiny's Child	United States	"Survivor"	2001	1	
The Detroit Spinners	United States	"Working My Way Back to You – Forgive Me Girl"	1980	2	
Dev	United States	"She Makes Me Wanna"	2011	1	JLS featuring Dev
Dexys Midnight Runners	England	"Geno"	1980	2	
Dexys Midnight Runners	England	"Come On Eileen"	1982	4	Biggest selling single of 1982
Tony Di Bart	England	"The Real Thing"	1994	1	
Jim Diamond	Scotland	"I Should Have Known Better"	1984	1	
Barbara Dickson	Scotland	"I Know Him So Well"	1985	4	Elaine Paige and Barbara Dickson
Celine Dion	Canada	"Think Twice"	1995	7	
Celine Dion	Canada	"My Heart Will Go On"	1998	2	
Iann Dior	United States	"Mood"	2020	4	24kGoldn featuring Iann Dior
Dizzee Rascal	England	"Dance wiv Me"	2008	4	Dizzee Rascal featuring Calvin Harris and Chrome
Dizzee Rascal	England	"Bonkers"	2009	2	Dizzee Rascal and Armand van Helden
Dizzee Rascal	England	"Holiday"	2009	1	Dizzee Rascal featuring Chrome
Dizzee Rascal	England	"Dirtee Disco"	2010	1	
Dizzee Rascal	England	"Shout"	2010	2	Shout for England featuring Dizzee Rascal and James Corden
Djo	United States	"End of Beginning"	2026	2	
Do	Netherlands	"Heaven"	2002	1	DJ Sammy and Yanou featuring Do
Doctor and the Medics	England	"Spirit in the Sky"	1986	3	
Dr. Hook	United States	"When You're in Love with a Beautiful Woman"	1979	3	
Ken Dodd	England	"Tears"	1965	5	Biggest selling single of 1965
Doja Cat	United States	"Paint the Town Red"	2023	5	
Joe Dolce	United States	"Shaddap You Face"	1981	3	
Lonnie Donegan	England	"Cumberland Gap"	1957	5	
Lonnie Donegan	England	"Gamblin' Man" / "Puttin' On the Style"	1957	2	
Lonnie Donegan	England	"My Old Man's a Dustman"	1960	4	
Jason Donovan	Australia	"Especially for You"	1989	3	Kylie and Jason
Jason Donovan	Australia	"Too Many Broken Hearts"	1989	2	
Jason Donovan	Australia	"Sealed with a Kiss"	1989	2	
Jason Donovan	Australia	"Any Dream Will Do"	1991	2	
Doop	Netherlands	"Doop"	1994	3	
Carl Douglas	Jamaica	"Kung Fu Fighting"	1974	3	
Craig Douglas	England	"Only Sixteen"	1959	4	
Drake	Canada	"What's My Name?"	2011	1	Rihanna featuring Drake
Drake	Canada	"One Dance"	2016	15	Drake featuring Wizkid and Kyla, biggest selling single of 2016
Drake	Canada	"God's Plan"	2018	9	
Drake	Canada	"Nice for What"	2018	1	
Drake	Canada	"In My Feelings"	2018	4	
Drake	Canada	"Toosie Slide"	2020	1	
D:Ream	Northern Ireland	"Things Can Only Get Better"	1994	4	
The Dream Weavers	United States	"It's Almost Tomorrow"	1956	3	
Duffy	Wales	"Mercy"	2008	5	
Duke Dumont	England	"Need U (100%)"	2013	2	Duke Dumont featuring A*M*E
Duke Dumont	England	"I Got U"	2014	1	Duke Dumont featuring Jax Jones
Dunblane	Scotland	"Knockin' on Heaven's Door"	1996	1	
Clive Dunn	England	"Grandad"	1971	3	
Duran Duran	England	"Is There Something I Should Know?"	1983	2	
Duran Duran	England	"The Reflex"	1984	4	
Ian Dury and the Blockheads	England	"Hit Me with Your Rhythm Stick"	1979	1	
Dvbbs	Canada	"Tsunami (Jump)"	2014	1	Dvbbs and Borgeous Featuring Tinie Tempah

== E ==
Back to top

Artist	Country	Number-one single(s)	Year	Weeks at #1	Notes
Eamon	United States	"Fuck It (I Don't Want You Back)"	2004	4	
East 17	England	"Stay Another Day"	1994	5	1994's Christmas number one
Edison Lighthouse	England	"Love Grows (Where My Rosemary Goes)"	1970	5	
Dave Edmunds	Wales	"I Hear You Knocking"	1970	6	1970's Christmas number one
Tommy Edwards	United States	"It's All in the Game"	1958	3	
Eiffel 65	Italy	"Blue (Da Ba Dee)"	1999	3	
Billie Eilish	United States	"No Time to Die"	2020	1	
Billie Eilish	United States	"What Was I Made For?"	2023	1	
Billie Eilish	United States	"Guess"	2024	1	Charli XCX featuring Billie Eilish
Electric Light Orchestra	England	"Xanadu"	1980	2	Olivia Newton-John and Electric Light Orchestra
Missy Elliott	United States	"I Want You Back"	1998	1	Mel B featuring Missy Elliott, also provides uncredited vocals on 2001's "Lady Marmalade"
Sophie Ellis-Bextor	England	"Groovejet (If This Ain't Love)"	2000	1	Spiller (lead vocals by Sophie Ellis-Bextor)
Eminem	United States	"The Real Slim Shady"	2000	1	His single "Love the Way You Lie" featuring Rihanna was the biggest selling single of 2010, despite only reaching number two on the weekly chart
Eminem	United States	"Stan"	2000	1	His single "Love the Way You Lie" featuring Rihanna was the biggest selling single of 2010, despite only reaching number two on the weekly chart
Eminem	United States	"Without Me"	2002	1	His single "Love the Way You Lie" featuring Rihanna was the biggest selling single of 2010, despite only reaching number two on the weekly chart
Eminem	United States	"Lose Yourself"	2002	1	His single "Love the Way You Lie" featuring Rihanna was the biggest selling single of 2010, despite only reaching number two on the weekly chart
Eminem	United States	"Just Lose It"	2004	1	His single "Love the Way You Lie" featuring Rihanna was the biggest selling single of 2010, despite only reaching number two on the weekly chart
Eminem	United States	"Like Toy Soldiers"	2005	1	His single "Love the Way You Lie" featuring Rihanna was the biggest selling single of 2010, despite only reaching number two on the weekly chart
Eminem	United States	"Smack That"	2006	1	Akon featuring Eminem
Eminem	United States	"The Monster"	2013	1	Eminem featuring Rihanna
Eminem	United States	"River"	2018	1	Eminem featuring Ed Sheeran
Eminem	United States	"Godzilla"	2020	1	Eminem featuring Juice Wrld
Eminem	United States	"Houdini"	2024	2	
England World Cup Squad	England	"Back Home"	1970	3	
England World Cup Squad	England	"World in Motion"	1990	2	Englandneworder
Enigma	Germany	"Sadeness (Part I)"	1991	1	
Enya	Ireland	"Orinoco Flow"	1988	3	
Enya	Ireland	"I Don't Wanna Know"	2004	2	Mario Winans featuring Enya and P. Diddy
The Equals	England	"Baby, Come Back"	1968	3	
Erasure	England	Abba-esque	1992	5	
David Essex	England	"Gonna Make You a Star"	1974	3	
David Essex	England	"Hold Me Close"	1975	3	
Estelle	England	"American Boy"	2008	4	Estelle featuring Kanye West
Don Estelle	England	"Whispering Grass"	1975	3	Windsor Davies and Don Estelle
Eternal	England	"I Wanna Be the Only One"	1997	1	Eternal featuring BeBe Winans
Europe	Sweden	"The Final Countdown"	1986	2	
Eurythmics	England	"There Must Be an Angel (Playing with My Heart)"	1985	1	
Evanescence	United States	"Bring Me to Life"	2003	4	
Faith Evans	United States	"I'll Be Missing You"	1997	6	Puff Daddy and Faith Evans featuring 112
Nathan Evans	Scotland	"Wellerman"	2021	2	Nathan Evans, 220 Kid and Billen Ted
Sian Evans	Wales	"Louder"	2011	1	DJ Fresh featuring Sian Evans
The Everly Brothers	United States	"All I Have to Do Is Dream" / "Claudette"	1958	7	
The Everly Brothers	United States	"Cathy's Clown"	1960	7	
The Everly Brothers	United States	"Walk Right Back" / "Ebony Eyes"	1961	3	
The Everly Brothers	United States	"Temptation"	1961	2	
Example	England	"Changed the Way You Kiss Me"	2011	2	
Example	England	"Stay Awake"	2011	1	
Ella Eyre	England	"Waiting All Night"	2013	1	Rudimental featuring Ella Eyre
George Ezra	England	"Shotgun"	2018	4	

== F ==
Back to top

Artist	Country	Number-one single(s)	Year	Weeks at #1	Notes
Fairground Attraction	England	"Perfect"	1988	1	
Adam Faith	England	"What Do You Want?"	1959	3	
Adam Faith	England	"Poor Me"	1960	2	
Paloma Faith	England	"Changing"	2014	1	Sigma featuring Paloma Faith
Falco	Austria	"Rock Me Amadeus"	1986	1	
Georgie Fame	England	"Yeh, Yeh"	1965	2	Georgie Fame and the Blue Flames
Georgie Fame	England	"Get Away"	1966	1	Georgie Fame and the Blue Flames
Georgie Fame	England	"The Ballad of Bonnie and Clyde"	1968	1	
Far East Movement	United States	"Get Up (Rattle)"	2013	2	Bingo Players featuring Far East Movement
Chris Farlowe	England	"Out of Time"	1966	1	
Fatboy Slim	England	"Praise You"	1999	1	Has other number ones with The Housemartins and Beats International
Fatman Scoop	United States	"Be Faithful"	2003	2	
Rhenzy Feliz	United States	"We Don't Talk About Bruno"	2022	7	Carolina Gaitán, Mauro Castillo, Adassa, Rhenzy Feliz, Diane Guerrero and Stephanie Beatriz
Sam Fender	England	"Rein Me In"	2026	23	Sam Fender and Olivia Dean
Fergie	United States	"Gettin' Over You"	2010	1	David Guetta and Chris Willis featuring Fergie and LMFAO, has more number ones with the Black Eyed Peas
Ferry Aid		"Let It Be"	1987	3	
The Firm	England	"Star Trekkin'"	1987	2	
Eddie Fisher	United States	"Outside of Heaven"	1953	1	
Eddie Fisher	United States	"I'm Walking Behind You"	1953	1	Eddie Fisher featuring Sally Sweetland
Five	England	"Keep On Movin'"	1999	1	
Five	England	"We Will Rock You"	2000	1	Five and Queen
Five	England	"Let's Dance"	2001	2	
Fleetwood Mac	England / United States	"Albatross"	1969	1	
Flo Rida	United States	"Right Round"	2009	1	Flo Rida featuring Kesha
Flo Rida	United States	Bad Boys"	2009	1	Alexandra Burke featuring Flo Rida
Flo Rida	United States	"Club Can't Handle Me"	2010	1	Flo Rida featuring David Guetta
Flo Rida	United States	"Good Feeling"	2012	1	
Flo Rida	United States	"Troublemaker"	2012	2	Olly Murs featuring Flo Rida
The Floaters	United States	"Float On"	1977	1	
Florence and the Machine	England	"Spectrum (Say My Name)"	2012	3	Remixed by Calvin Harris
The Flying Pickets	England	"Only You"	1983	5	1983's Christmas number one
Luis Fonsi	Puerto Rico	"Despacito"	2017	11	Luis Fonsi and Daddy Yankee featuring Justin Bieber
Emile Ford	Saint Lucia	"What Do You Want to Make Those Eyes at Me For?"	1959	6	Emile Ford and the Checkmates, 1959's Christmas number one
Tennessee Ernie Ford	United States	"Give Me Your Word"	1955	7	
Tennessee Ernie Ford	United States	"Sixteen Tons"	1956	4	
Foreigner	England / United States	"I Want to Know What Love Is"	1985	3	
The Foundations	England	"Baby Now That I've Found You"	1967	2	
The Four Pennies	England	"Juliet"	1964	1	
The Four Seasons	United States	"December, 1963 (Oh, What a Night)"	1976	2	
Four Tops	United States	"Reach Out I'll Be There"	1966	3	
Cass Fox	England	"Touch Me"	2001	1	Rui da Silva featuring Cassandra
Fragma	Germany	"Toca's Miracle"	2000	2	
Connie Francis	United States	"Who's Sorry Now?"	1958	6	
Connie Francis	United States	"Stupid Cupid" / "Carolina Moon"	1958	6	
Frankee	United States	"F.U.R.B. (Fuck You Right Back)"	2004	3	
Frankie Goes to Hollywood	England	"Relax"	1984	5	
Frankie Goes to Hollywood	England	"Two Tribes"	1984	9	
Frankie Goes to Hollywood	England	"The Power of Love"	1984	1	
Aretha Franklin	United States	"I Knew You Were Waiting (For Me)"	1987	2	Aretha Franklin and George Michael
Fredo	England	"Funky Friday"	2018	1	Dave featuring Fredo
DJ Fresh	England	"Louder"	2011	1	DJ Fresh featuring Sian Evans
DJ Fresh	England	"Hot Right Now"	2012	1	DJ Fresh featuring Rita Ora
Fugees	United States / Haiti	"Killing Me Softly"	1996	5	Biggest selling single of 1996
Fugees	United States / Haiti	"Ready or Not"	1996	2	
Fun	United States	"We Are Young"	2012	1	Fun featuring Janelle Monáe
Nelly Furtado	Canada	"Maneater"	2006	3	
Nelly Furtado	Canada	"Give It to Me"	2007	1	Timbaland featuring Nelly Furtado and Justin Timberlake

== G ==
Back to top

Artist	Country	Number-one single(s)	Year	Weeks at #1	Notes
Gina G	Australia	"Ooh Aah... Just a Little Bit"	1996	1	
Gabrielle	England	"Dreams"	1993	3	
Gabrielle	England	"Rise"	2000	2	
Lady Gaga	United States	"Just Dance"	2009	3	Lady Gaga featuring Colby O'Donis
Lady Gaga	United States	"Poker Face"	2009	3	Biggest selling single of 2009
Lady Gaga	United States	"Bad Romance"	2009	2	
Lady Gaga	United States	"Telephone"	2010	2	Lady Gaga featuring Beyoncé
Lady Gaga	United States	"Shallow"	2018	2	Lady Gaga and Bradley Cooper
Lady Gaga	United States	"Rain on Me"	2020	1	Lady Gaga and Ariana Grande
Serge Gainsbourg	France	"Je t'aime... moi non plus"	1969	1	Serge Gainsbourg and Jane Birkin
Carolina Gaitán	Colombia	"We Don't Talk About Bruno"	2022	7	Carolina Gaitán, Mauro Castillo, Adassa, Rhenzy Feliz, Diane Guerrero and Stephanie Beatriz
Boris Gardiner	Jamaica	"I Want to Wake Up with You"	1986	3	
Art Garfunkel	United States	"I Only Have Eyes for You"	1975	2	Has another number one as part of Simon & Garfunkel
Art Garfunkel	United States	"Bright Eyes"	1979	6	1979's biggest-selling single
Siedah Garrett	United States	"I Just Can't Stop Loving You"	1987	2	Michael Jackson with Siedah Garrett
Martin Garrix	Netherlands	"Animals"	2013	1	
Barbara Gaskin	England	"It's My Party"	1981	4	Dave Stewart with Barbara Gaskin
Gareth Gates	England	"Unchained Melody"	2002	4	
Gareth Gates	England	"Anyone of Us (Stupid Mistake)"	2002	3	
Gareth Gates	England	"The Long and Winding Road" / "Suspicious Minds"	2002	2	Will Young and Gareth Gates / Gareth Gates
Gareth Gates	England	"Spirit in the Sky"	2003	2	Gareth Gates featuring The Kumars
Marvin Gaye	United States	"I Heard It Through the Grapevine"	1969	3	
Gayle	United States	"ABCDEFU"	2022	1	
Gloria Gaynor	United States	"I Will Survive"	1979	4	
Bobbie Gentry	United States	"I'll Never Fall in Love Again"	1969	1	
Gerry and the Pacemakers	England	"How Do You Do It?"	1963	3	
Gerry and the Pacemakers	England	"I Like It"	1963	4	
Gerry and the Pacemakers	England	"You'll Never Walk Alone"	1963	4	
Robin Gibb	England	"(Barry) Islands in the Stream"	2009	1	Vanessa Jenkins and Bryn West featuring Tom Jones and Robin Gibb, has other number ones with the Bee Gees
Girls Aloud	England / Ireland	"Sound of the Underground"	2002	4	2002's Christmas number one
Girls Aloud	England / Ireland	"I'll Stand by You"	2004	2	
Girls Aloud	England / Ireland	"Walk This Way"	2007	1	Sugababes vs. Girls Aloud
Girls Aloud	England / Ireland	"The Promise"	2008	1	
Gary Glitter	England	"I'm the Leader of the Gang (I Am)"	1973	4	
Gary Glitter	England	"I Love You Love Me Love"	1973	4	
Gary Glitter	England	"Always Yours"	1974	1	
Jess Glynne	England	"Rather Be"	2014	4	Clean Bandit featuring Jess Glynne
Jess Glynne	England	"My Love"	2014	1	Route 94 featuring Jess Glynne
Jess Glynne	England	"Hold My Hand"	2015	3	
Jess Glynne	England	"Not Letting Go"	2015	1	Tinie Tempah featuring Jess Glynne
Jess Glynne	England	"Don't Be So Hard on Yourself"	2015	1	
Jess Glynne	England	"These Days"	2018	1	Rudimental featuring Jess Glynne, Macklemore and Dan Caplen
Jess Glynne	England	"I'll Be There"	2018	1	
Gnarls Barkley	United States	"Crazy"	2006	9	Biggest selling single of 2006
Goombay Dance Band	Germany	"Seven Tears"	1982	3	
GoonRock	United States	"Party Rock Anthem"	2011	4	LMFAO featuring Lauren Bennett and GoonRock
Gorillaz	England	"Dare"	2005	1	Features uncredited vocals from Shaun Ryder
Gotye	Belgium / Australia	"Somebody That I Used to Know"	2012	5	Biggest selling single of 2012
Ellie Goulding	England	"Burn"	2013	3	
Ellie Goulding	England	"Love Me Like You Do"	2015	4	
Ellie Goulding	England	"River"	2019	1	
Ellie Goulding	England	"Miracle"	2023	8	Calvin Harris and Ellie Goulding
Kenya Grace	England	"Strangers"	2023	3	
Ariana Grande	United States	"Problem"	2014	1	Ariana Grande featuring Iggy Azalea, first number one with streaming data included
Ariana Grande	United States	"Bang Bang"	2014	1	Jessie J, Ariana Grande and Nicki Minaj
Ariana Grande	United States	"Thank U, Next"	2018	6	
Ariana Grande	United States	"7 Rings"	2019	4	
Ariana Grande	United States	"Break Up with Your Girlfriend, I'm Bored"	2019	1	
Ariana Grande	United States	"Rain on Me"	2020	1	Lady Gaga and Ariana Grande
Ariana Grande	United States	"Positions"	2020	6	
Ariana Grande	United States	"Hate That I Made You Love Me"	2026	1	
Eddy Grant	Guyana / England	"I Don't Wanna Dance"	1982	3	Has another number one with The Equals
CeeLo Green	United States	"Fuck You"	2010	2	Has another number one with Gnarls Barkley
Professor Green	England	"Read All About It"	2011	2	Professor Green featuring Emeli Sandé
Norman Greenbaum	United States	"Spirit in the Sky"	1970	2	
Diane Guerrero	United States	"We Don't Talk About Bruno"	2022	7	Carolina Gaitán, Mauro Castillo, Adassa, Rhenzy Feliz, Diane Guerrero and Stephanie Beatriz
David Guetta	France	"When Love Takes Over"	2009	1	David Guetta featuring Kelly Rowland
David Guetta	France	"Sexy Bitch"	2009	1	David Guetta featuring Akon
David Guetta	France	"Gettin' Over You"	2010	1	David Guetta and Chris Willis featuring Fergie and LMFAO
David Guetta	France	"Club Can't Handle Me"	2010	1	Flo Rida featuring David Guetta
David Guetta	France	"Titanium"	2012	1	David Guetta featuring Sia
David Guetta	France	"Lovers on the Sun"	2014	1	David Guetta featuring Sam Martin
David Guetta	France	"I'm Good (Blue)"	2022	1	David Guetta and Bebe Rexha
Gunna	United States	"Lemonade"	2020	1	Internet Money, Gunna, and Don Toliver featuring Nav

== H ==
Back to top

Artist	Country	Number-one single(s)	Year	Weeks at #1	Notes
Ben Haenow	England	"Something I Need"	2014	1	2014's Christmas number one
Hale and Pace	England	"The Stonk"	1991	1	Hale and Pace and the Stonkers
Bill Haley & His Comets	United States	"Rock Around the Clock"	1955	5	Biggest selling single of the 1950s decade
Geri Halliwell	England	"Mi Chico Latino"	1999	1	Has other number ones with the Spice Girls
Geri Halliwell	England	"Lift Me Up"	1999	1	Has other number ones with the Spice Girls
Geri Halliwell	England	"Bag It Up"	2000	1	Has other number ones with the Spice Girls
Geri Halliwell	England	"It's Raining Men"	2001	2	Has other number ones with the Spice Girls
Halsey	United States	"Closer"	2016	4	The Chainsmokers featuring Halsey
Halsey	United States	"Eastside"	2018	1	Benny Blanco, Halsey and Khalid
Hanson	United States	"MMMBop"	1997	3	
Paul Hardcastle	England	"19"	1985	5	
Duane Harden	United States	"You Don't Know Me"	1999	1	Armand van Helden featuring Duane Harden
Steve Harley & Cockney Rebel	England	"Make Me Smile (Come Up and See Me)"	1975	2	
Jack Harlow	United States	"Lovin On Me"	2023	3	
Calvin Harris	Scotland	"Dance wiv Me"	2008	4	Dizzee Rascal featuring Calvin Harris and Chrome
Calvin Harris	Scotland	"I'm Not Alone"	2009	2	
Calvin Harris	Scotland	"We Found Love"	2011	6	Rihanna featuring Calvin Harris
Calvin Harris	Scotland	"Sweet Nothing"	2012	1	Calvin Harris featuring Florence Welch
Calvin Harris	Scotland	"Under Control"	2013	1	Calvin Harris and Alesso featuring Hurts
Calvin Harris	Scotland	"Summer"	2014	1	
Calvin Harris	Scotland	"Blame"	2014	1	Calvin Harris featuring John Newman
Calvin Harris	Scotland	"Feels"	2017	1	Calvin Harris featuring Pharrell Williams, Katy Perry and Big Sean
Calvin Harris	Scotland	"One Kiss"	2018	8	Calvin Harris and Dua Lipa
Calvin Harris	Scotland	"Promises"	2018	6	Calvin Harris and Sam Smith
Calvin Harris	Scotland	"Miracle"	2023	8	Calvin Harris and Ellie Goulding
Jet Harris	England	"Diamonds"	1963	3	Jet Harris and Tony Meehan, has more number ones with The Shadows
Rolf Harris	Australia	"Two Little Boys"	1969	6	1969's Christmas number one
George Harrison	England	"My Sweet Lord"	1971	5	Biggest-selling single of 1971
George Harrison	England	"My Sweet Lord" (reissue)	2002	1	Posthumous number one, has more number ones with The Beatles
Chesney Hawkes	England	"The One and Only"	1991	5	
Hear'Say	England	"Pure and Simple"	2001	3	
Hear'Say	England	"The Way to Your Love"	2001	1	
Oliver Heldens	Netherlands	"Gecko (Overdrive)"	2014	1	Oliver Heldens and Becky Hill, the last single to be number one based on paid-for sales alone.
Helping Haiti		"Everybody Hurts"	2010	2	
Ella Henderson	England	"Ghost"	2014	2	
Jimi Hendrix	United States	"Voodoo Child (Slight Return)"	1970	1	Posthumous number one
Herman's Hermits	England	"I'm Into Something Good"	1964	2	
The Highwaymen	United States	"Michael"	1961	1	
Becky Hill	England	"Gecko (Overdrive)"	2014	1	Oliver Heldens and Becky Hill
Benny Hill	England	"Ernie (The Fastest Milkman in the West)"	1971	4	1971's Christmas number one
Keri Hilson	United States	"The Way I Are"	2007	2	Timbaland featuring Keri Hilson
Ronnie Hilton	England	"No Other Love"	1956	6	
Michael Holliday	England	"The Story of My Life"	1958	2	
Michael Holliday	England	"Starry Eyed"	1960	1	
The Hollies	England	"I'm Alive"	1965	3	
The Hollies	England	"He Ain't Heavy, He's My Brother"	1988	2	
Buddy Holly	United States	"It Doesn't Matter Anymore"	1959	3	Posthumous number one, has another number one with The Crickets
The Honeycombs	England	"Have I the Right?"	1964	2	
Mary Hopkin	Wales	"Those Were the Days"	1968	6	
Hot Chocolate	England	"So You Win Again"	1977	3	
The Housemartins	England	"Caravan of Love"	1986	1	
Whitney Houston	United States	"Saving All My Love for You"	1985	2	
Whitney Houston	United States	"I Wanna Dance with Somebody (Who Loves Me)"	1987	2	
Whitney Houston	United States	"One Moment in Time"	1988	2	
Whitney Houston	United States	"I Will Always Love You"	1992	10	1992's Christmas number one and biggest-selling single
Hozier	Ireland	"Too Sweet"	2024	2	
The Human League	England	"Don't You Want Me"	1981	5	1981's Christmas number one and biggest-selling single
Engelbert Humperdinck	England	"Release Me"	1967	6	Biggest selling single of 1967
Engelbert Humperdinck	England	"The Last Waltz"	1967	5	
Tab Hunter	United States	"Young Love"	1957	7	
Huntrix	United States / South Korea	"Golden"	2025	10	Huntrix (Ejae, Audrey Nuna and Rei Ami)
Steve "Silk" Hurley	United States	"Jack Your Body"	1987	2	
Hurts	England	"Under Control"	2013	1	Calvin Harris and Alesso featuring Hurts
Chrissie Hynde	United States	"I Got You Babe"	1985	1	UB40 and Chrissie Hynde, has another number one with Pretenders
Chrissie Hynde	United States	"Love Can Build a Bridge"	1995	1	Cher, Chrissie Hynde and Neneh Cherry with Eric Clapton

== I ==
Back to top

Artist	Country	Number-one single(s)	Year	Weeks at #1	Notes
Icona Pop	Sweden	"I Love It"	2013	1	Icona Pop featuring Charli XCX
Frank Ifield	England / Australia	"I Remember You"	1962	7	Biggest selling single of 1962
Frank Ifield	England / Australia	"Lovesick Blues"	1962	5	
Frank Ifield	England / Australia	"The Wayward Wind"	1963	3	
Frank Ifield	England / Australia	"Confessin'"	1963	2	
Enrique Iglesias	Spain	"Hero"	2002	4	
Julio Iglesias	Spain	"Begin the Beguine (Volver a Empezar)"	1981	1	
Internet Money	United States	"Lemonade"	2020	1	Internet Money, Gunna and Don Toliver featuring Nav
Interplanetary Criminal	England	"B.O.T.A. (Baddest of Them All)"	2022	2	Eliza Rose and Interplanetary Criminal
Iron Maiden	England	"Bring Your Daughter... to the Slaughter"	1990	2	
Iyaz	British Virgin Islands	"Replay"	2010	2	

== J ==
Back to top

Artist	Country	Number-one single(s)	Year	Weeks at #1	Notes
Jessie J	England	"Price Tag"	2011	2	Jessie J featuring B.o.B
Jessie J	England	"Domino"	2012	2	
Jessie J	England	"Bang Bang"	2014	1	Jessie J, Ariana Grande and Nicki Minaj
Ja Rule	United States	"Wonderful"	2004	1	Ja Rule featuring R. Kelly and Ashanti
Terry Jacks	Canada	"Seasons in the Sun"	1974	4	
Leon Jackson	Scotland	"When You Believe"	2007	3	2007's Christmas number one
Michael Jackson	United States	"One Day in Your Life"	1981	2	Has another number one with The Jacksons.
Michael Jackson	United States	"Billie Jean"	1983	1	Has another number one with The Jacksons.
Michael Jackson	United States	"I Just Can't Stop Loving You"	1987	2	Michael Jackson with Siedah Garrett
Michael Jackson	United States	"Black or White"	1991	2	
Michael Jackson	United States	"You Are Not Alone"	1995	2	
Michael Jackson	United States	"Earth Song"	1995	6	1995's Christmas number one
Michael Jackson	United States	"Blood on the Dance Floor"	1997	1	
The Jacksons	United States	"Show You the Way to Go"	1977	1	
Jagged Edge	United States	"Nasty Girl"	2006	2	The Notorious B.I.G. featuring Diddy, Nelly, Jagged Edge and Avery Storm
Mick Jagger	England	"Dancing in the Street"	1985	4	David Bowie and Mick Jagger, has more number ones with The Rolling Stones.
The Jam	England	"Going Underground" / "Dreams of Children"	1980	3	
The Jam	England	"Start!"	1980	1	
The Jam	England	"Town Called Malice" / "Precious"	1982	3	
The Jam	England	"Beat Surrender"	1982	2	
Tommy James and the Shondells	United States	"Mony Mony"	1968	3	
Jamiroquai	England	"Deeper Underground"	1998	1	
Jawsh 685	New Zealand	"Savage Love (Laxed – Siren Beat)"	2020	3	Jawsh 685 and Jason Derulo
Jay-Z	United States	"Crazy in Love"	2003	3	Beyoncé featuring Jay-Z
Jay-Z	United States	"Déjà Vu"	2006	1	Beyoncé featuring Jay-Z
Jay-Z	United States	"Umbrella"	2007	10	Rihanna featuring Jay-Z
Jay-Z	United States	"Run This Town"	2009	1	Jay-Z featuring Rihanna and Kanye West
DJ Jazzy Jeff & the Fresh Prince	United States	"Boom! Shake the Room"	1993	2	
Wyclef Jean	Haiti	"Hips Don't Lie"	2006	5	Shakira featuring Wyclef Jean, has more number ones with Fugees
Carly Rae Jepsen	Canada	"Call Me Maybe"	2012	4	
Saint Jhn	Guyana / United States	"Roses"	2020	2	Remixed by Imanbek
Jive Bunny and the Mastermixers	England	"Swing the Mood"	1989	5	
Jive Bunny and the Mastermixers	England	"That's What I Like"	1989	3	
Jive Bunny and the Mastermixers	England	"Let's Party"	1989	1	
JLS	England	"Beat Again"	2009	2	
JLS	England	"Everybody in Love"	2009	1	
JLS	England	"The Club Is Alive"	2010	1	
JLS	England	"Love You More"	2010	1	
JLS	England	"She Makes Me Wanna"	2011	1	JLS featuring Dev
JLS	England	"Wishing on a Star"	2011	1	The X Factor Finalists 2011 featuring JLS and One Direction
Billy Joel	United States	"Uptown Girl"	1983	5	
Elton John	England	"Don't Go Breaking My Heart"	1976	6	Elton John and Kiki Dee
Elton John	England	"Sacrifice" / "Healing Hands"	1990	5	
Elton John	England	"Don't Let the Sun Go Down on Me"	1991	2	George Michael and Elton John
Elton John	England	"Something About the Way You Look Tonight" / "Candle in the Wind 1997"	1997	5	Biggest selling single of 1997, the 1990s decade, and all time based on purchases alone
Elton John	England	"Sorry Seems to Be the Hardest Word"	2002	1	Blue featuring Elton John
Elton John	England	"Are You Ready for Love"	2003	1	Remixed by Ashley Beedle
Elton John	England	"Ghetto Gospel"	2005	3	2Pac featuring Elton John
Elton John	England	"Cold Heart (Pnau remix)"	2021	1	Elton John and Dua Lipa
Elton John	England	Merry Christmas"	2021	3	Ed Sheeran and Elton John
Elton John	England	"Sausage Rolls for Everyone"	2021	1	LadBaby featuring Ed Sheeran and Elton John
Holly Johnson	England	"Ferry 'Cross the Mersey"	1989	3	Gerry Marsden, Paul McCartney, Holly Johnson, The Christians and Stock Aitken Waterman, has more number ones with Frankie Goes to Hollywood
The Johnston Brothers	England	"Hernando's Hideaway"	1955	2	
Jax Jones	England	"I Got U"	2014	1	Duke Dumont featuring Jax Jones
Jimmy Jones	United States	"Good Timin'"	1960	3	
Ruth Jones	Wales	"(Barry) Islands in the Stream"	2009	1	Vanessa Jenkins and Bryn West featuring Tom Jones and Robin Gibb
Tom Jones	Wales	"It's Not Unusual"	1965	1	
Tom Jones	Wales	"Green, Green Grass of Home"	1966	7	1966's Christmas number one and biggest selling single
Tom Jones	Wales	"(Barry) Islands in the Stream"	2009	1	Vanessa Jenkins and Bryn West featuring Tom Jones and Robin Gibb
Juice Wrld	United States	"Godzilla"	2020	1	Eminem featuring Juice Wrld, posthumous number one
Gary Jules	United States	"Mad World"	2003	3	Michael Andrews featuring Gary Jules
Junkie XL	Netherlands	"A Little Less Conversation"	2002	4	Elvis vs. JXL
The Justice Collective		"He Ain't Heavy, He's My Brother"	2012	1	2012's Christmas number one

== K ==
Back to top

Artist	Country	Number-one single(s)	Year	Weeks at #1	Notes
Noah Kahan	United States	"Stick Season"	2024	7	Biggest selling single of 2024
Kaiser Chiefs	England	"Ruby"	2007	1	
Kajagoogoo	England	"Too Shy"	1983	2	
Kalin Twins	United States	"When"	1958	5	
Kitty Kallen	United States	"Little Things Mean a Lot"	1954	1	
Eden Kane	England	"Well I Ask You"	1961	1	
Peter Kay	England	"(Is This the Way to) Amarillo"	2005	7	Tony Christie featuring Peter Kay
Peter Kay	England	"I'm Gonna Be (500 Miles)"	2007	3	The Proclaimers featuring Brian Potter and Andy Pipkin
Peter Kay	England	"The Official BBC Children in Need Medley"	2009	2	Peter Kay's Animated All Star Band
KC and the Sunshine Band	United States	"Give It Up"	1983	3	
KDA	England	"Turn the Music Louder (Rumble)"	2015	1	KDA featuring Tinie Tempah and Katy B
Ronan Keating	Ireland	"When You Say Nothing at All"	1999	2	Has other number ones with Boyzone
Ronan Keating	Ireland	"Life Is a Rollercoaster"	2000	1	Has other number ones with Boyzone
Ronan Keating	Ireland	"If Tomorrow Never Comes"	2002	1	Has other number ones with Boyzone
Jerry Keller	United States	"Here Comes Summer"	1959	1	
R. Kelly	United States	"I Believe I Can Fly"	1997	3	
R. Kelly	United States	"Ignition"	2003	4	
R. Kelly	United States	"Wonderful"	2004	1	Ja Rule featuring R. Kelly and Ashanti
Kesha	United States	"Right Round"	2009	1	Flo Rida featuring Kesha
Kesha	United States	"We R Who We R"	2011	1	
Kesha	United States	"Timber"	2014	1	Pitbull featuring Kesha
Las Ketchup	Spain	"The Ketchup Song (Aserejé)"	2002	1	
DJ Khaled	United States	"I'm the One"	2017	1	DJ Khaled featuring Justin Bieber, Quavo, Chance the Rapper and Lil Wayne
DJ Khaled	United States	"Wild Thoughts"	2017	1	DJ Khaled featuring Rihanna and Bryson Tiller
Khalid	United States	"Eastside"	2018	1	Benny Blanco, Halsey and Khalid
Khalid	United States	"Beautiful People"	2019	1	Ed Sheeran featuring Khalid
Wiz Khalifa	United States	"Payphone"	2012	2	Maroon 5 featuring Wiz Khalifa
Wiz Khalifa	United States	"See You Again"	2015	2	Wiz Khalifa featuring Charlie Puth
Chaka Khan	United States	"I Feel for You"	1984	3	
Kid Rock	United States	"All Summer Long"	2008	1	
Johnny Kidd and the Pirates	England	"Shakin' All Over"	1960	1	
Nicole Kidman	Australia	"Somethin' Stupid"	2001	3	Robbie Williams and Nicole Kidman, 2001's Christmas number one
Kiesza	Canada	"Hideaway"	2014	1	
Kimbra	New Zealand	"Somebody That I Used to Know"	2012	5	Gotye featuring Kimbra
Ben E. King	United States	"Stand by Me"	1987	3	
Kings of Leon	United States	"Sex on Fire"	2008	3	
Sean Kingston	Jamaica / United States	"Beautiful Girls"	2007	4	
The Kinks	England	"You Really Got Me"	1964	2	
The Kinks	England	"Tired of Waiting for You"	1965	1	
The Kinks	England	"Sunny Afternoon"	1966	2	
Fern Kinney	United States	"Together We Are Beautiful"	1980	1	
Kleerup	Sweden	"With Every Heartbeat"	2007	1	Robyn with Kleerup
The KLF	England	"Doctorin' the Tardis"	1988	1	The Timelords
The KLF	England	"3 a.m. Eternal"	1991	2	
Kraftwerk	Germany	"The Model" / "Computer Love"	1982	1	
Billy J. Kramer and the Dakotas	England	"Bad to Me"	1963	3	
Billy J. Kramer and the Dakotas	England	"Little Children"	1964	2	
Lenny Kravitz	United States	"Fly Away"	1999	1	
The Kumars	England	"Spirit in the Sky"	2003	2	Gareth Gates featuring the Kumars
Josh Kumra	England	"Don't Go"	2011	1	Wretch 32 featuring Josh Kumra
KWS	England	"Please Don't Go"	1992	5	
Kyla	England	"One Dance"	2016	15	Drake featuring Wizkid and Kyla

== L ==
Back to top

Artist	Country	Number-one single(s)	Year	Weeks at #1	Notes
Labrinth	England	"Beneath Your Beautiful"	2012	1	Labrinth featuring Emeli Sandé, also provides uncredited vocals on "Pass Out" by Tinie Tempah
LadBaby	England	"We Built This City"	2018	1	2018's Christmas number one
LadBaby	England	"I Love Sausage Rolls"	2019	1	2019's Christmas number one
LadBaby	England	"Don't Stop Me Eatin'"	2020	1	2020's Christmas number one
LadBaby	England	"Sausage Rolls for Everyone"	2021	1	LadBaby featuring Ed Sheeran and Elton John, 2021's Christmas number one
LadBaby	England	"Food Aid"	2022	1	2022's Christmas number one, features uncredited vocals from Martin Lewis
Frankie Laine	United States	"I Believe"	1953	18	Biggest selling single of 1953
Frankie Laine	United States	"Hey Joe"	1953	2	
Frankie Laine	United States	"Answer Me"	1953	8	1953's Christmas number one
Frankie Laine	United States	"A Woman in Love"	1956	4	
Kendrick Lamar	United States	"Not Like Us"	2025	2	
Ella Langley	United States	"Choosin' Texas"	2026	1	
Zara Larsson	Sweden	"Symphony"	2017	1	Clean Bandit featuring Zara Larsson
Fedde Le Grand	Netherlands	"Put Your Hands Up for Detroit"	2006	1	
John Legend	United States	"Lay Me Down"	2015	2	Sam Smith featuring John Legend
John Lennon	England	"(Just Like) Starting Over"	1980	1	Posthumous number ones, has more number ones with The Beatles
John Lennon	England	"Imagine"	1981	4	Posthumous number ones, has more number ones with The Beatles
John Lennon	England	"Woman"	1981	2	Posthumous number ones, has more number ones with The Beatles
Jerry Lee Lewis	United States	"Great Balls of Fire"	1958	2	
Leona Lewis	England	"A Moment Like This"	2006	4	2006's Christmas number one
Leona Lewis	England	"Bleeding Love"	2007	7	Biggest selling single of 2007
Leona Lewis	England	"Run"	2008	2	
Lewisham and Greenwich NHS Choir	England	"A Bridge over You"	2015	1	2015's Christmas number one
John Leyton	England	"Johnny Remember Me"	1961	4	
LF System	Scotland	"Afraid to Feel"	2022	8	
Liberty X	England / Ireland	"Just a Little"	2002	1	
Lieutenant Pigeon	England	"Mouldy Old Dough"	1972	4	
The Lightning Seeds	England	"Three Lions"	1996	3	Baddiel, Skinner and The Lightning Seeds
The Lightning Seeds	England	"3 Lions '98"	1998	3	Baddiel, Skinner and The Lightning Seeds
Lil Dicky	United States	"Freaky Friday"	2018	1	Lil Dicky featuring Chris Brown, features uncredited cameos from Ed Sheeran, DJ Khaled and Kendall Jenner
Lil Jon	United States	"Yeah!"	2004	2	Usher featuring Lil Jon and Ludacris
Lil' Kim	United States	"Lady Marmalade"	2001	1	Christina Aguilera, Lil' Kim, Mya and Pink
Lil Nas X	United States	"Old Town Road"	2019	2	Remix featuring Billy Ray Cyrus
Lil Nas X	United States	"Montero (Call Me by Your Name)"	2021	5	
Lil Wayne	United States	"I'm the One"	2017	1	DJ Khaled featuring Justin Bieber, Quavo, Chance the Rapper and Lil Wayne
Lilly Wood and the Prick	France	"Prayer in C"	2014	2	Lilly Wood and Robin Schulz
Limp Bizkit	United States	"Rollin'"	2001	2	
Dua Lipa	England	"New Rules"	2017	2	
Dua Lipa	England	"One Kiss"	2018	8	Calvin Harris and Dua Lipa, biggest selling single of 2018
Dua Lipa	England	"Cold Heart (Pnau remix)"	2021	1	Elton John and Dua Lipa
Dua Lipa	England	"Dance the Night"	2023	1	
Little Mix	England	"Cannonball"	2011	1	
Little Mix	England	"Wings"	2012	1	
Little Mix	England	"Black Magic"	2015	3	
Little Mix	England	"Shout Out to My Ex"	2016	3	
Little Mix	England	"Sweet Melody"	2021	1	
BBC Radio 1's Live Lounge Allstars		"Times Like These"	2020	1	
Livin' Joy	Italy	"Dreamer"	1995	1	
LL Cool J	United States	"Ain't Nobody"	1997	1	
Cher Lloyd	England	"Swagger Jagger"	2011	1	
LMC	England	"Take Me to the Clouds Above"	2004	2	LMC vs. U2
LMFAO	United States	"Gettin' Over You"	2010	1	David Guetta and Chris Willis featuring Fergie and LMFAO
LMFAO	United States	"Party Rock Anthem"	2011	4	LMFAO featuring Lauren Bennett and GoonRock
Los Lobos	United States	"La Bamba"	1987	2	
Johnny Logan	Ireland	"What's Another Year"	1980	2	
Lisa "Left Eye" Lopes	United States	"Never Be the Same Again"	2000	1	Melanie C featuring Lisa "Left Eye" Lopes
Jennifer Lopez	United States	"Love Don't Cost a Thing"	2001	1	
Jennifer Lopez	United States	"Get Right"	2005	1	
Jennifer Lopez	United States	"On the Floor"	2011	2	Jennifer Lopez featuring Pitbull
Lorde	New Zealand	"Royals"	2013	1	
Lost Frequencies	Belgium	"Are You with Me"	2015	1	Last song to be number one when the chart was revealed on Sunday.
Pixie Lott	England	"Mama Do"	2009	1	
Pixie Lott	England	"Boys and Girls"	2009	1	
Pixie Lott	England	"All About Tonight"	2011	1	
Demi Lovato	United States	"Solo"	2018	1	Clean Bandit featuring Demi Lovato
Love Affair	England	"Everlasting Love"	1968	2	
Matt Lucas	England	"I'm Gonna Be (500 Miles)"	2007	3	The Proclaimers featuring Brian Potter and Andy Pipkin
Ludacris	United States	"Yeah!"	2004	2	Usher featuring Lil Jon and Ludacris
Baz Luhrmann	Australia	"Everybody's Free (To Wear Sunscreen)"	1999	1	
Lukas Graham	Denmark	"7 Years"	2016	5	
Lulu	Scotland	"Relight My Fire"	1993	2	Take That featuring Lulu
L.V.	United States	"Gangsta's Paradise"	1995	2	Coolio featuring L.V.
Vera Lynn	England	"My Son, My Son"	1954	2	

== M ==
Back to top

Artist	Country	Number-one single(s)	Year	Weeks at #1	Notes
Macklemore	United States	"These Days"	2018	1	Rudimental featuring Jess Glynne, Macklemore and Dan Caplen, has another number one as part of Macklemore & Ryan Lewis
Macklemore & Ryan Lewis	United States	"Thrift Shop"	2013	1	Macklemore & Ryan Lewis featuring Wanz
Madison Avenue	Australia	"Don't Call Me Baby"	2000	1	
Madness	England	"House of Fun"	1982	2	
Madonna	United States	"Into the Groove"	1985	4	
Madonna	United States	"Papa Don't Preach"	1986	3	
Madonna	United States	"True Blue"	1986	1	
Madonna	United States	"La Isla Bonita"	1987	2	
Madonna	United States	"Who's That Girl"	1987	1	
Madonna	United States	"Like a Prayer"	1989	3	
Madonna	United States	"Vogue"	1990	4	
Madonna	United States	"Frozen"	1998	1	
Madonna	United States	"American Pie"	2000	1	
Madonna	United States	"Music"	2000	1	
Madonna	United States	"Hung Up"	2005	3	
Madonna	United States	"Sorry"	2006	1	
Madonna	United States	"4 Minutes"	2008	4	Madonna featuring Justin Timberlake
Magic!	Canada	"Rude"	2014	1	
Major Lazer	United States	"Cold Water"	2016	5	Major Lazer featuring Justin Bieber and MØ
Gareth Malone	England	"Wherever You Are"	2011	1	Military Wives with Gareth Malone, 2011's Christmas number one
Gareth Malone	England	"Wake Me Up"	2014	1	Gareth Malone's All-Star Choir
Post Malone	United States	"Rockstar"	2017	4	Post Malone featuring 21 Savage
Post Malone	United States	"Fortnight"	2024	1	Taylor Swift featuring Post Malone
Manchester United F.C.	England	"Come On You Reds"	1994	2	
Manfred Mann	England	"Do Wah Diddy Diddy"	1964	2	
Manfred Mann	England	"Pretty Flamingo"	1966	3	
Manfred Mann	England	"Mighty Quinn"	1968	2	
The Manhattan Transfer	United States	"Chanson D'Amour"	1977	3	
Manic Street Preachers	Wales	"If You Tolerate This Your Children Will Be Next"	1998	1	
Manic Street Preachers	Wales	"The Masses Against the Classes"	2000	1	
Mantovani	Italy	"The Song from Moulin Rouge"	1953	1	
Mantovani	Italy	"Cara Mia"	1954	10	David Whitfield with Mantovani and his Orchestra
The Marcels	United States	"Blue Moon"	1961	2	
Kelly Marie	Scotland	"Feels Like I'm in Love"	1980	2	
Marmalade	Scotland	"Ob-La-Di, Ob-La-Da"	1969	3	
Maroon 5	United States	"Payphone"	2012	2	Maroon 5 featuring Wiz Khalifa
MARRS	England	"Pump Up the Volume"	1987	2	
Bruno Mars	United States	"Nothin' on You"	2010	1	B.o.B featuring Bruno Mars
Bruno Mars	United States	"Just the Way You Are"	2010	2	
Bruno Mars	United States	"Grenade"	2011	2	
Bruno Mars	United States	"The Lazy Song"	2011	1	
Bruno Mars	United States	"Uptown Funk"	2014	7	Mark Ronson featuring Bruno Mars
Gerry Marsden	England	"Ferry 'Cross the Mersey"	1989	3	Gerry Marsden, Paul McCartney, Holly Johnson, The Christians and Stock Aitken Waterman, has more number ones with Gerry and the Pacemakers
Lena Martell	Scotland	"One Day at a Time"	1979	3	
Dean Martin	United States	"Memories Are Made of This"	1956	4	
John Martin	Sweden	"Don't You Worry Child"	2012	1	Swedish House Mafia featuring John Martin
Ricky Martin	Puerto Rico	"Livin' la Vida Loca"	1999	3	
Sam Martin	United States	"Lovers on the Sun"	2014	1	David Guetta featuring Sam Martin
Al Martino	United States	"Here in My Heart"	1952	9	First ever number one
Hank Marvin	England	"Living Doll"	1986	3	Cliff Richard and The Young Ones featuring Hank Marvin, has more number ones with The Shadows
Lee Marvin	United States	"Wand'rin' Star"	1970	3	
The Mash	United States	"Theme from M*A*S*H (Suicide Is Painless)"	1980	3	
Johnny Mathis	United States	"When a Child Is Born (Soleado)"	1976	3	1976's Christmas number one
Matthews Southern Comfort	England	"Woodstock"	1970	3	
Ava Max	United States	"Sweet but Psycho"	2018	4	
Paul McCartney	England	"Ebony and Ivory"	1982	3	Paul McCartney and Stevie Wonder
Paul McCartney	England	"Pipes of Peace"	1984	2	Has more number ones with The Beatles and Wings
Paul McCartney	England	"Ferry 'Cross the Mersey"	1989	3	Gerry Marsden, Paul McCartney, Holly Johnson, The Christians and Stock Aitken Waterman
George McCrae	United States	"Rock Your Baby"	1974	3	
Martine McCutcheon	England	"Perfect Moment"	1999	2	
Joe McElderry	England	"The Climb"	2009	1	
Brian McFadden	Ireland	"Real to Me"	2004	1	Has more number ones with Westlife
McFly	England	"5 Colours in Her Hair"	2004	2	
McFly	England	"Obviously"	2004	1	
McFly	England	"All About You" / "You've Got a Friend"	2005	1	
McFly	England	"I'll Be OK"	2005	1	
McFly	England	"Don't Stop Me Now" / "Please, Please"	2006	1	
McFly	England	"Star Girl"	2006	1	
McFly	England	"Baby's Coming Back" / "Transylvania"	2007	1	
Tim McGraw	United States	"Over and Over"	2005	1	Nelly featuring Tim McGraw
Maria McKee	United States	"Show Me Heaven"	1990	4	
Scott McKenzie	United States	"San Francisco (Be Sure to Wear Flowers in Your Hair)"	1967	4	
Don McLean	United States	"Vincent"	1972	2	
Don McLean	United States	"Crying"	1980	3	
Meat Loaf	United States	"I'd Do Anything for Love (But I Won't Do That)"	1993	7	Biggest selling single of 1993
Meck	England	"Thunder in My Heart Again"	2006	2	Meck featuring Leo Sayer
Glenn Medeiros	United States	"Nothing's Gonna Change My Love for You"	1988	4	
Tony Meehan	England	"Diamonds"	1963	3	Jet Harris and Tony Meehan, has more number ones with The Shadows
Megan Thee Stallion	United States	"WAP"	2020	3	Cardi B featuring Megan Thee Stallion
Mel and Kim	England	"Respectable"	1987	1	
Katie Melua	Georgia / England	"What a Wonderful World"	2007	1	Eva Cassidy and Katie Melua
Men at Work	Australia	"Down Under"	1983	3	
Shawn Mendes	Canada	"Stitches"	2016	2	
Shawn Mendes	Canada	"Señorita"	2019	6	Shawn Mendes and Camila Cabello
DJ Mental Theo's Bazzheadz	Netherlands	"Now You're Gone"	2008	5	Basshunter featuring DJ Mental Theo's Bazzheadz
Freddie Mercury	England	"Living on My Own"	1993	2	Remixed version, posthumous number one, has more number ones with Queen
George Michael	England	"Careless Whisper"	1984	3	Has more number ones with Wham!
George Michael	England	"A Different Corner"	1986	3	Has more number ones with Wham!
George Michael	England	"I Knew You Were Waiting (For Me)"	1987	2	Aretha Franklin and George Michael
George Michael	England	"Don't Let the Sun Go Down on Me"	1991	2	George Michael and Elton John
George Michael	England	Five Live	1993	3	George Michael and Queen with Lisa Stansfield
George Michael	England	"Jesus to a Child"	1996	1	
George Michael	England	"Fastlove"	1996	3	
Michelle	Scotland	"All This Time"	2004	3	
Middle of the Road	Scotland	"Chirpy Chirpy Cheep Cheep"	1971	5	
Mika	England	"Grace Kelly"	2007	5	
Military Wives	England	"Wherever You Are"	2011	1	Military Wives with Gareth Malone, 2011's Christmas number one
Jamie Miller	Wales	"Babydoll"	2026	5	
Roger Miller	United States	"King of the Road"	1965	1	
Steve Miller Band	United States	"The Joker"	1990	2	
Russ Millions	England	"Body"	2021	3	Tion Wayne and Russ Millions, remix featuring ArrDee, Bugzy Malone, Darkoo, Fivio Foreign, Buni, E1 and ZT
Nicki Minaj	Trinidad and Tobago	"Bang Bang"	2014	1	Jessie J, Ariana Grande and Nicki Minaj
Kylie Minogue	Australia	"I Should Be So Lucky"	1988	5	
Kylie Minogue	Australia	"Especially for You"	1989	3	Kylie and Jason
Kylie Minogue	Australia	"Hand on Your Heart"	1989	1	
Kylie Minogue	Australia	"Tears on My Pillow"	1990	1	
Kylie Minogue	Australia	"Spinning Around"	2000	1	
Kylie Minogue	Australia	"Can't Get You Out of My Head"	2001	4	
Kylie Minogue	Australia	"Slow"	2003	1	
Kylie Minogue	Australia	"XMAS"	2025	1	2025's Christmas number one
Mint Royale	England	"Singin' in the Rain"	2008	2	
The Miracles	United States	"The Tears of a Clown"	1970	1	Smokey Robinson and the Miracles
Guy Mitchell	United States	"She Wears Red Feathers"	1953	4	
Guy Mitchell	United States	"Look at That Girl"	1953	6	
Guy Mitchell	United States	"Singing the Blues"	1957	3	
Guy Mitchell	United States	"Rock-a-Billy"	1957	1	
MK	United States	"Dior"	2025	2	MK featuring Chrystal
MNEK	England	"Head & Heart"	2020	6	Joel Corry and MNEK
MØ	Denmark	"Cold Water"	2016	5	Major Lazer featuring Justin Bieber and MØ
Modjo	France	"Lady (Hear Me Tonight)"	2000	2	
Janelle Monáe	United States	"We Are Young"	2012	1	Fun featuring Janelle Monáe
The Monkees	United States	"I'm a Believer"	1967	4	
Hugo Montenegro	United States	"The Good, the Bad and the Ugly"	1968	4	
The Moody Blues	England	"Go Now"	1965	1	
Captain Tom Moore	England	"You'll Never Walk Alone"	2020	1	Michael Ball and Captain Tom Moore
Jane Morgan	United States	"The Day the Rains Came"	1959	1	
Laza Morgan	United States / Jamaica	"Start Without You"	2010	2	Alexandra Burke featuring Laza Morgan
Sarah Jane Morris	England	"Don't Leave Me This Way"	1986	4	The Communards featuring Sarah Jane Morris
Mark Morrison	England	"Return of the Mack"	1996	2	
The Move	England	"Blackberry Way"	1969	1	
Mud	England	"Tiger Feet"	1974	4	Biggest selling single of 1974
Mud	England	"Lonely This Christmas"	1974	4	1974's Christmas number one
Mud	England	"Oh Boy"	1975	2	
Mungo Jerry	England	"In the Summertime"	1970	7	Biggest selling single of 1970
Mungo Jerry	England	"Baby Jump"	1971	2	
Ruby Murray	Northern Ireland	"Softly, Softly"	1955	3	
Olly Murs	England	"Please Don't Let Me Go"	2010	1	
Olly Murs	England	"Heart Skips a Beat"	2011	1	Olly Murs featuring Rizzle Kicks
Olly Murs	England	"Dance with Me Tonight"	2011	1	
Olly Murs	England	"Troublemaker"	2012	2	Olly Murs featuring Flo Rida
Musical Youth	Jamaica / England	"Pass the Dutchie"	1982	3	
My Chemical Romance	United States	"Welcome to the Black Parade"	2006	2	
Mya	United States	"Lady Marmalade"	2001	1	Christina Aguilera, Lil' Kim, Mya and Pink

== N ==
Back to top

Artist	Country	Number-one single(s)	Year	Weeks at #1	Notes
Jimmy Nail	England	"Ain't No Doubt"	1992	3	
Johnny Nash	United States	"Tears on My Pillow"	1975	1	
Naughty Boy	England	"La La La"	2013	1	Naughty Boy featuring Sam Smith
Nav	Canada	"Lemonade"	2020	1	Internet Money, Gunna and Don Toliver featuring Nav
Nayer	United States	"Give Me Everything"	2011	3	Pitbull featuring Ne-Yo, Afrojack and Nayer
N-Dubz	England	"Number 1"	2009	3	Tinchy Stryder featuring N-Dubz
Nelly	United States	"Dilemma"	2002	2	Nelly featuring Kelly Rowland
Nelly	United States	"My Place" / "Flap Your Wings"	2004	1	
Nelly	United States	"Over and Over"	2005	1	Nelly featuring Tim McGraw
Nelly	United States	"Nasty Girl"	2006	2	The Notorious B.I.G. featuring Diddy, Nelly, Jagged Edge and Avery Storm
Phyllis Nelson	United States	"Move Closer"	1985	1	
Nena	Germany	"99 Red Balloons"	1984	3	
Nero	England	"Promises"	2011	1	
Jason Nevins	United States	"It's Like That"	1998	6	Run-DMC vs. Jason Nevins
New Edition	United States	"Candy Girl"	1983	1	
New Kids on the Block	United States	"You Got It (The Right Stuff)"	1989	3	
New Kids on the Block	United States	"Hangin' Tough"	1990	2	
New Order	England	"World in Motion"	1990	2	Englandneworder
The New Seekers	England	"I'd Like to Teach the World to Sing (In Perfect Harmony)"	1972	4	
The New Seekers	England	"You Won't Find Another Fool Like Me"	1974	1	
Anthony Newley	England	"Why"	1960	4	
Anthony Newley	England	"Do You Mind"	1960	1	100th number one
John Newman	England	"Feel the Love"	2012	1	Rudimental featuring John Newman
John Newman	England	"Love Me Again"	2013	1	
John Newman	England	"Blame"	2014	1	Calvin Harris featuring John Newman
Olivia Newton-John	England / Australia	"You're the One That I Want"	1978	9	John Travolta and Olivia Newton-John
Olivia Newton-John	England / Australia	"Summer Nights"	1978	7	John Travolta and Olivia Newton-John
Olivia Newton-John	England / Australia	"Xanadu"	1980	2	Olivia Newton-John and Electric Light Orchestra
Ne-Yo	United States	"So Sick"	2006	1	
Ne-Yo	United States	"Closer"	2008	1	
Ne-Yo	United States	"Beautiful Monster"	2010	1	
Ne-Yo	United States	"Give Me Everything"	2011	3	Pitbull featuring Ne-Yo, Afrojack and Nayer
Ne-Yo	United States	"Let Me Love You (Until You Learn to Love Yourself)"	2012	1	
Nico & Vinz	Norway	"Am I Wrong"	2014	2	
Nicole	Germany	"A Little Peace"	1982	2	500th number one
Nilsson	United States	"Without You"	1972	5	
Nizlopi	England	"JCB"	2005	1	
No Doubt	United States	"Don't Speak"	1997	3	
Sak Noel	Spain	"Loca People"	2011	1	
The Notorious B.I.G.	United States	"Nasty Girl"	2006	2	The Notorious B.I.G. featuring Diddy, Nelly, Jagged Edge and Avery Storm, posthumous number one
Gary Numan	England	"Cars"	1979	1	Has another number one with Tubeway Army

== O ==
Back to top

Artist	Country	Number-one single(s)	Year	Weeks at #1	Notes
Oasis	England	"Some Might Say"	1995	1	
Oasis	England	"Don't Look Back in Anger"	1996	1	
Oasis	England	"D'You Know What I Mean?"	1997	1	
Oasis	England	"All Around the World"	1998	1	
Oasis	England	"Go Let It Out"	2000	1	
Oasis	England	"The Hindu Times"	2002	1	
Oasis	England	"Lyla"	2005	1	
Oasis	England	"The Importance of Being Idle"	2005	1	
Billy Ocean	Trinidad and Tobago / England	"When the Going Gets Tough, the Tough Get Going"	1986	4	
Des O'Connor	England	"I Pretend"	1968	1	
Sinéad O'Connor	Ireland	"Nothing Compares 2 U"	1990	4	
Colby O'Donis	United States	"Just Dance"	2009	3	Lady Gaga featuring Colby O'Donis
Odyssey	United States	"Use It Up and Wear It Out"	1980	2	
Esther & Abi Ofarim	Israel	"Cinderella Rockefella"	1968	3	
The Offspring	United States	"Pretty Fly (for a White Guy)"	1999	1	
Mr. Oizo	France	"Flat Beat"	1999	2	
Olive	England	"You're Not Alone"	1997	2	
Omi	Jamaica	"Cheerleader"	2015	4	Remixed by Felix Jaehn
One Direction	England / Ireland	"What Makes You Beautiful"	2011	1	
One Direction	England / Ireland	"Wishing on a Star"	2011	1	The X Factor Finalists 2011 featuring JLS and One Direction
One Direction	England / Ireland	"Little Things"	2012	1	
One Direction	England / Ireland	"One Way or Another (Teenage Kicks)"	2013	1	
One Direction	England / Ireland	"Drag Me Down"	2015	1	
OneRepublic	United States	"Counting Stars"	2013	2	
Rita Ora	England	"Hot Right Now"	2012	1	DJ Fresh featuring Rita Ora
Rita Ora	England	"R.I.P"	2012	2	Rita Ora featuring Tinie Tempah
Rita Ora	England	"How We Do (Party)"	2012	1	
Rita Ora	England	"I Will Never Let You Down"	2014	1	
Roy Orbison	United States	"Only the Lonely"	1960	2	
Roy Orbison	United States	"It's Over"	1964	2	
Roy Orbison	United States	"Oh, Pretty Woman"	1964	3	
Tony Orlando and Dawn	United States	"Knock Three Times"	1971	5	Dawn
Tony Orlando and Dawn	United States	"Tie a Yellow Ribbon Round the Ole Oak Tree"	1973	4	1973's biggest selling single
Orson	United States	"No Tomorrow"	2006	1	
Kelly Osbourne	England	"Changes"	2003	1	Ozzy and Kelly Osbourne
Ozzy Osbourne	England	"Changes"	2003	1	Ozzy and Kelly Osbourne
Donny Osmond	United States	"Puppy Love"	1972	5	Has another number one with The Osmonds
Donny Osmond	United States	"The Twelfth of Never"	1973	1	Has another number one with The Osmonds
Donny Osmond	United States	"Young Love"	1973	4	Has another number one with The Osmonds
Jimmy Osmond	United States	"Long Haired Lover from Liverpool"	1972	5	1972's Christmas number one. Has another number one with The Osmonds
The Osmonds	United States	"Love Me for a Reason"	1974	3	
Gilbert O'Sullivan	Ireland	"Clair"	1972	2	
Gilbert O'Sullivan	Ireland	"Get Down"	1973	2	
DJ Ötzi	Austria	"Hey Baby"	2001	1	
The Outhere Brothers	United States	"Don't Stop (Wiggle Wiggle)"	1995	1	
The Outhere Brothers	United States	"Boom Boom Boom"	1995	4	
The Overlanders	England	"Michelle"	1966	3	
Owl City	United States	"Fireflies"	2010	3	
Oxide & Neutrino	England	"Bound 4 da Reload (Casualty)"	2000	1	Have another number one with So Solid Crew

== P ==
Back to top

Artist	Country	Number-one single(s)	Year	Weeks at #1	Notes
P. Diddy	United States	"I'll Be Missing You"	1997	6	Puff Daddy and Faith Evans featuring 112
P. Diddy	United States	"I Don't Wanna Know"	2004	2	Mario Winans featuring Enya and P. Diddy
P. Diddy	United States	"Nasty Girl"	2006	2	The Notorious B.I.G. featuring Diddy, Nelly, Jagged Edge and Avery Storm Posthumous Number One
Petey Pablo	United States	"Goodies"	2005	1	Ciara featuring Petey Pablo
Elaine Paige	England	"I Know Him So Well"	1985	4	Elaine Paige and Barbara Dickson
Paper Lace	England	"Billy Don't Be a Hero"	1974	3	
Simon Park Orchestra	England	"Eye Level"	1973	4	
Partners in Kryme	United States	"Turtle Power!"	1990	4	
Sean Paul	Jamaica	"Breathe"	2003	4	Blu Cantrell featuring Sean Paul
Sean Paul	Jamaica	"What About Us"	2013	1	The Saturdays featuring Sean Paul
Sean Paul	Jamaica	"Rockabye"	2016	9	Clean Bandit featuring Sean Paul and Anne-Marie
Freda Payne	United States	"Band of Gold"	1970	6	
Gigi Perez	United States	"Sailor Song"	2024	1	
Katy Perry	United States	"I Kissed a Girl"	2008	5	
Katy Perry	United States	"California Gurls"	2010	2	Katy Perry featuring Snoop Dogg
Katy Perry	United States	"Part of Me"	2012	1	
Katy Perry	United States	"Roar"	2013	2	
Katy Perry	United States	"Feels"	2017	1	Calvin Harris featuring Pharrell Williams, Katy Perry and Big Sean
Pet Shop Boys	England	"West End Girls"	1986	2	
Pet Shop Boys	England	"It's a Sin"	1987	3	
Pet Shop Boys	England	"Always on My Mind"	1987	4	1987's Christmas number one
Pet Shop Boys	England	"Heart"	1988	3	
Peter and Gordon	England	"A World Without Love"	1964	2	
Peters and Lee	England	"Welcome Home"	1973	1	
Kim Petras	Germany	"Unholy"	2022	4	Sam Smith and Kim Petras
DJ Pied Piper and the Masters of Ceremonies	England	"Do You Really Like It?"	2001	1	
Pilot	Scotland	"January"	1975	3	
Pink	United States	"Lady Marmalade"	2001	1	Christina Aguilera, Lil' Kim, Mya and Pink
Pink	United States	"Just Like a Pill"	2002	1	
Pink	United States	"So What"	2008	3	
Pink Floyd	England	"Another Brick in the Wall"	1979	5	1979's Christmas number one
Billie Piper	England	"Because We Want To"	1998	1	Billie
Billie Piper	England	"Girlfriend"	1998	1	Billie
Billie Piper	England	"Day and Night"	2000	1	
Pitbull	United States	"On the Floor"	2011	2	Jennifer Lopez featuring Pitbull
Pitbull	United States	"Give Me Everything"	2011	3	Pitbull featuring Ne-Yo, Afrojack and Nayer
Pitbull	United States	"Timber"	2014	1	Pitbull featuring Kesha
Gene Pitney	United States	"Something's Gotten Hold of My Heart"	1989	4	Marc Almond featuring Gene Pitney
Rachel Platten	United States	"Fight Song"	2015	1	1300th number one
The Platters	United States	"Smoke Gets in Your Eyes"	1959	1	
The Police	England	"Message in a Bottle"	1979	3	
The Police	England	"Walking on the Moon"	1979	1	
The Police	England	"Don't Stand So Close to Me"	1980	4	Biggest selling single of 1980
The Police	England	"Every Little Thing She Does Is Magic"	1981	1	
The Police	England	"Every Breath You Take"	1983	4	
Mike Posner	United States	"I Took a Pill in Ibiza"	2016	4	Remixed by Seeb
Pérez Prado	Cuba	"Cherry Pink (and Apple Blossom White)"	1955	2	
Elvis Presley	United States	"All Shook Up"	1957	7	
Elvis Presley	United States	"Jailhouse Rock"	1958	3	Biggest selling single of 1958
Elvis Presley	United States	"One Night" / "I Got Stung"	1959	3	
Elvis Presley	United States	"A Fool Such as I" / "I Need Your Love Tonight"	1959	5	
Elvis Presley	United States	"It's Now or Never"	1960	8	Biggest selling single of 1960
Elvis Presley	United States	"Are You Lonesome Tonight?"	1960	4	
Elvis Presley	United States	"Wooden Heart"	1961	6	Biggest selling single of 1961
Elvis Presley	United States	"Surrender"	1961	4	
Elvis Presley	United States	"(Marie's the Name) His Latest Flame" / "Little Sister"	1961	4	
Elvis Presley	United States	"Can't Help Falling in Love" / "Rock-A-Hula Baby"	1962	4	
Elvis Presley	United States	"Good Luck Charm"	1962	5	
Elvis Presley	United States	"She's Not You"	1962	3	
Elvis Presley	United States	"Return to Sender"	1962	3	1962's Christmas number one
Elvis Presley	United States	"(You're the) Devil in Disguise"	1963	1	
Elvis Presley	United States	"Crying in the Chapel"	1965	2	
Elvis Presley	United States	"The Wonder of You"	1970	6	
Elvis Presley	United States	"Way Down"	1977	5	Posthumous number one
Elvis Presley	United States	"A Little Less Conversation"	2002	4	Elvis vs. JXL, posthumous number one
Elvis Presley	United States	"Jailhouse Rock" (reissue)	2005	1	Posthumous number one
Elvis Presley	United States	"One Night" / "I Got Stung" (reissue)	2005	1	1000th number one, posthumous number one
Elvis Presley	United States	"It's Now or Never" (reissue)	2005	1	Posthumous number one
Billy Preston	United States	"Get Back"	1969	6	The Beatles with Billy Preston
Johnny Preston	United States	"Running Bear"	1960	2	
Pretenders	England / United States	"Brass in Pocket"	1980	2	
Prince	United States	"The Most Beautiful Girl in the World"	1994	2	
Mr. Probz	Netherlands	"Waves"	2014	2	Remixed by Robin Schulz
The Proclaimers	Scotland	"I'm Gonna Be (500 Miles)"	2007	3	The Proclaimers featuring Brian Potter and Andy Pipkin
Procol Harum	England	"A Whiter Shade of Pale"	1967	6	
The Prodigy	England	"Firestarter"	1996	3	
The Prodigy	England	"Breathe"	1996	2	
Eric Prydz	Sweden	"Call on Me"	2004	5	
Psy	South Korea	"Gangnam Style"	2012	1	
Gary Puckett & The Union Gap	United States	"Young Girl"	1968	4	
Pussycat	Netherlands	"Mississippi"	1976	4	
The Pussycat Dolls	United States	"Don't Cha"	2005	3	The Pussycat Dolls featuring Busta Rhymes
The Pussycat Dolls	United States	"Stickwitu"	2005	2	
Charlie Puth	United States	"See You Again"	2015	2	Wiz Khalifa featuring Charlie Puth
Charlie Puth	United States	"Marvin Gaye"	2015	1	Charlie Puth featuring Meghan Trainor

== Q ==
Back to top

Artist	Country	Number-one single(s)	Year	Weeks at #1	Notes
Suzi Quatro	United States	"Can the Can"	1973	1	
Suzi Quatro	United States	"Devil Gate Drive"	1974	2	
Quavo	United States	"I'm the One"	2017	1	DJ Khaled featuring Justin Bieber, Quavo, Chance the Rapper and Lil Wayne
Queen	England	"Bohemian Rhapsody"	1975	9	1975's Christmas number one
Queen	England	"Under Pressure"	1981	2	Queen and David Bowie
Queen	England	"Innuendo"	1991	1	
Queen	England	"Bohemian Rhapsody" / "These Are the Days of Our Lives"	1991	5	1991's Christmas number one
Queen	England	Five Live	1993	3	George Michael and Queen with Lisa Stansfield
Queen	England	"We Will Rock You"	2000	1	Five and Queen

== R ==
Back to top

Artist	Country	Number-one single(s)	Year	Weeks at #1	Notes
Rage Against the Machine	United States	"Killing in the Name"	2009	1	2009's Christmas number one
Marvin Rainwater	United States	"Whole Lotta Woman"	1958	3	
Johnnie Ray	United States	"Such a Night"	1954	1	
Johnnie Ray	United States	"Just Walkin' in the Rain"	1956	7	1956's Christmas number one
Johnnie Ray	United States	"Yes Tonight Josephine"	1957	3	
Raye	England	"Escapism"	2023	1	Raye featuring 070 Shake
Raye	England	"Where Is My Husband!"	2026	1	
Rayvon	Barbados	"Angel"	2001	3	Shaggy featuring Rayvon
Razorlight	England	"America"	2006	1	
The Real Thing	England	"You to Me Are Everything"	1976	3	
Redman	United States	"Dirrty"	2002	2	Christina Aguilera featuring Redman
Rednex	Sweden	"Cotton Eye Joe"	1995	3	
Jim Reeves	United States	"Distant Drums"	1966	5	Posthumous number one
Vic Reeves	England	"Dizzy"	1991	2	Vic Reeves and The Wonder Stuff
Renée and Renato	England / Italy	"Save Your Love"	1982	4	1982's Christmas number one
Bebe Rexha	United States	"I'm Good (Blue)"	2022	1	David Guetta and Bebe Rexha
Busta Rhymes	United States	"Don't Cha"	2005	3	The Pussycat Dolls featuring Busta Rhymes
Roddy Ricch	United States	"Rockstar"	2020	6	DaBaby featuring Roddy Ricch
Cliff Richard	England	"Living Doll"	1959	6	Biggest selling single of 1959
Cliff Richard	England	"Travellin' Light"	1959	5	
Cliff Richard	England	"Please Don't Tease"	1960	3	
Cliff Richard	England	"I Love You"	1960	2	1960's Christmas number one
Cliff Richard	England	"The Young Ones"	1962	6	
Cliff Richard	England	"The Next Time" / "Bachelor Boy"	1963	3	
Cliff Richard	England	"Summer Holiday"	1963	3	
Cliff Richard	England	"The Minute You're Gone"	1965	1	
Cliff Richard	England	"Congratulations"	1968	2	
Cliff Richard	England	"We Don't Talk Anymore"	1979	4	
Cliff Richard	England	"Living Doll"	1986	3	Cliff Richard and The Young Ones featuring Hank Marvin
Cliff Richard	England	"Mistletoe and Wine"	1988	4	1988's Christmas number one and biggest selling single
Cliff Richard	England	"Saviour's Day"	1990	1	1990's Christmas number one
Cliff Richard	England	"The Millennium Prayer"	1999	3	
Wendy Richard	England	"Come Outside"	1962	2	Mike Sarne featuring Wendy Richard
Lionel Richie	United States	"Hello"	1984	6	Has another number one with the Commodores
Right Said Fred	England	"Deeply Dippy"	1992	3	
The Righteous Brothers	United States	"You've Lost That Lovin' Feelin'"	1965	2	
The Righteous Brothers	United States	"Unchained Melody"	1990	4	Biggest selling single of 1990
Rihanna	Barbados	"Umbrella"	2007	10	Rihanna featuring Jay-Z
Rihanna	Barbados	"Take a Bow"	2008	2	
Rihanna	Barbados	"Run This Town"	2009	1	Jay-Z featuring Rihanna and Kanye West
Rihanna	Barbados	"Only Girl (In the World)"	2010	2	
Rihanna	Barbados	"What's My Name?"	2011	1	Rihanna featuring Drake
Rihanna	Barbados	"We Found Love"	2011	6	Rihanna featuring Calvin Harris
Rihanna	Barbados	"Diamonds"	2012	1	
Rihanna	Barbados	"The Monster"	2013	1	Eminem featuring Rihanna
Rihanna	Barbados	"Wild Thoughts"	2017	1	DJ Khaled featuring Rihanna and Bryson Tiller
RikRok	Jamaica / England	"It Wasn't Me"	2001	1	Shaggy featuring RikRok
LeAnn Rimes	United States	"Can't Fight the Moonlight"	2000	1	
Rixton	England	"Me and My Broken Heart"	2014	1	
Rizzle Kicks	England	"Heart Skips a Beat"	2011	1	Olly Murs featuring Rizzle Kicks
Chappell Roan	United States	"Pink Pony Club"	2025	2	
Chappell Roan	United States	"The Subway"	2025	1	
Smokey Robinson	United States	"Being with You"	1981	2	Has another number one with The Miracles
Robson & Jerome	England	"Unchained Melody" / "White Cliffs of Dover"	1995	7	Biggest selling single of 1995
Robson & Jerome	England	"I Believe" / "Up on the Roof"	1995	4	
Robson & Jerome	England	"What Becomes of the Brokenhearted" / "Saturday Night at the Movies" / "You'll Never Walk Alone"	1996	2	
Robyn	Sweden	"With Every Heartbeat"	2007	1	Robyn with Kleerup
Lord Rockingham's XI	England	"Hoots Mon"	1958	3	
Nile Rodgers	United States	"Get Lucky"	2013	4	Daft Punk featuring Pharrell Williams and Nile Rodgers
Olivia Rodrigo	United States	"Drivers License"	2021	9	
Olivia Rodrigo	United States	"Good 4 U"	2021	5	
Olivia Rodrigo	United States	"Vampire"	2023	1	
Olivia Rodrigo	United States	"Drop Dead"	2026	1	
Tommy Roe	United States	"Dizzy"	1969	1	
Kenny Rogers	United States	"Lucille"	1977	1	
Kenny Rogers	United States	"Coward of the County"	1980	2	
Roll Deep	England	"Good Times"	2010	3	
Roll Deep	England	"Green Light"	2010	1	
The Rolling Stones	England	"It's All Over Now"	1964	1	
The Rolling Stones	England	"Little Red Rooster"	1964	1	
The Rolling Stones	England	"The Last Time"	1965	3	
The Rolling Stones	England	"(I Can't Get No) Satisfaction"	1965	2	
The Rolling Stones	England	"Get Off of My Cloud"	1965	3	
The Rolling Stones	England	"Paint It Black"	1966	1	
The Rolling Stones	England	"Jumpin' Jack Flash"	1968	2	
The Rolling Stones	England	"Honky Tonk Women"	1969	5	
Nicky Romero	Netherlands	"I Could Be the One"	2013	1	Avicii vs. Nicky Romero
Mark Ronson	England	"Uptown Funk"	2014	7	Mark Ronson featuring Bruno Mars, biggest selling single of 2015
Room 5	Italy	"Make Luv"	2003	4	Room 5 featuring Oliver Cheatham
Eliza Rose	England	"B.O.T.A. (Baddest of Them All)"	2022	2	Eliza Rose and Interplanetary Criminal, 1400th number one single
Diana Ross	United States	"I'm Still Waiting"	1971	4	Has another number one with The Supremes
Diana Ross	United States	"Chain Reaction"	1986	3	Has another number one with The Supremes
Demis Roussos	Greece	The Roussos Phenomenon	1976	1	
Route 94	England	"My Love"	2014	1	Route 94 featuring Jess Glynne
La Roux	England	"Bulletproof"	2009	1	
Kelly Rowland	United States	"Dilemma"	2002	2	Nelly featuring Kelly Rowland, has more number ones with Destiny's Child
Kelly Rowland	United States	"When Love Takes Over"	2009	1	David Guetta featuring Kelly Rowland
Roxy Music	England	"Jealous Guy"	1981	2	
Royal Scots Dragoon Guards	Scotland	"Amazing Grace"	1972	5	Biggest selling single of 1972
Lita Roza	England	"(How Much Is) That Doggie in the Window?"	1953	1	
The Rubettes	England	"Sugar Baby Love"	1974	4	
Rudimental	England	"Feel the Love"	2012	1	Rudimental featuring John Newman
Rudimental	England	"Waiting All Night"	2013	1	Rudimental featuring Ella Eyre
Rudimental	England	"These Days"	2018	1	Rudimental featuring Jess Glynne, Macklemore and Dan Caplen
Run-DMC	United States	"It's Like That"	1998	6	Run-DMC vs. Jason Nevins
Jennifer Rush	United States	"The Power of Love"	1985	5	Biggest selling single of 1985

== S ==
Back to top

Artist	Country	Number-one single(s)	Year	Weeks at #1	Notes
S Club 7	England	"Bring It All Back"	1999	1	
S Club 7	England	"Never Had a Dream Come True"	2000	1	
S Club 7	England	"Don't Stop Movin'"	2001	2	
S Club 7	England	"Have You Ever"	2001		
Sam & Mark	England	"With a Little Help from My Friends"	2004	1	
Sam and the Womp	England / Netherlands	"Bom Bom"	2012	1	
DJ Sammy	Spain	"Heaven"	2002	1	DJ Sammy and Yanou featuring Do
Roger Sanchez	United States	"Another Chance"	2001	1	
Emeli Sandé	Scotland	"Read All About It"	2011	2	Professor Green featuring Emeli Sandé
Emeli Sandé	Scotland	"Beneath Your Beautiful"	2012	1	Labrinth featuring Emeli Sandé
Mike Sarne	England	"Come Outside"	1962	2	Mike Sarne featuring Wendy Richard
Peter Sarstedt	England	"Where Do You Go To (My Lovely)?"	1969	4	
The Saturdays	England / Ireland	"What About Us"	2013	1	The Saturdays featuring Sean Paul
Telly Savalas	United States	"If"	1975	2	
Leo Sayer	England	"When I Need You"	1977	3	
Leo Sayer	England	"Thunder in My Heart Again"	2006	2	Meck featuring Leo Sayer
The Scaffold	England	"Lily the Pink"	1968	4	1968's Christmas number one
Nicole Scherzinger	United States	"Don't Hold Your Breath"	2011	1	Has more number ones with The Pussycat Dolls
Robin Schulz	Germany	"Prayer in C"	2014	2	Lilly Wood and Robin Schulz
Scissor Sisters	United States	"I Don't Feel Like Dancin'"	2006	4	
Scouting for Girls	England	"This Ain't a Love Song"	2010	2	
The Script	Ireland	"Hall of Fame"	2012	2	The Script featuring will.i.am
The Searchers	England	"Sweets for My Sweet"	1963	2	
The Searchers	England	"Needles and Pins"	1964	3	
The Searchers	England	"Don't Throw Your Love Away"	1964	2	
Secondcity	United States / England	"I Wanna Feel"	2014	1	
The Seekers	Australia	"I'll Never Find Another You"	1965	2	
The Seekers	Australia	"The Carnival Is Over"	1965	3	
Captain Sensible	England	"Happy Talk"	1982	2	
S'Express	England	"Theme from S'Express"	1988	2	
The Shadows	England	"Apache"	1960	5	Have more number ones as Cliff Richard's backing band
The Shadows	England	"Kon-Tiki"	1961	1	Have more number ones as Cliff Richard's backing band
The Shadows	England	"Wonderful Land"	1962	8	Have more number ones as Cliff Richard's backing band
The Shadows	England	"Dance On!"	1963	1	Have more number ones as Cliff Richard's backing band
The Shadows	England	"Foot Tapper"	1963	1	Have more number ones as Cliff Richard's backing band
Shaggy	Jamaica	"Oh Carolina"	1993	2	
Shaggy	Jamaica	"Boombastic"	1995	1	
Shaggy	Jamaica	"It Wasn't Me"	2001	1	Shaggy featuring RikRok, biggest selling single of 2001
Shaggy	Jamaica	"Angel"	2001	3	Shaggy featuring Rayvon
Shakespears Sister	England	"Stay"	1992	8	
Shakin' Stevens	Wales	"This Ole House"	1981	3	
Shakin' Stevens	Wales	"Green Door"	1981	4	
Shakin' Stevens	Wales	"Oh Julie"	1982	1	
Shakin' Stevens	Wales	"Merry Christmas Everyone"	1985	2	1985's Christmas number one
Shakira	Colombia	"Hips Don't Lie"	2006	5	Shakira featuring Wyclef Jean
Shakira	Colombia	"Beautiful Liar"	2007	3	Beyoncé and Shakira, remixed by Freemasons
The Shamen	Scotland	"Ebeneezer Goode"	1992	4	
Shanks & Bigfoot	England	"Sweet Like Chocolate"	1999	2	
Del Shannon	United States	"Runaway"	1961	3	
The Shapeshifters	England	"Lola's Theme"	2004	1	
Helen Shapiro	England	"You Don't Know"	1961	3	
Helen Shapiro	England	"Walkin' Back to Happiness"	1961	3	
Feargal Sharkey	Northern Ireland	"A Good Heart"	1985	2	
Sandie Shaw	England	"(There's) Always Something There to Remind Me"	1964	3	
Sandie Shaw	England	"Long Live Love"	1965	3	
Sandie Shaw	England	"Puppet on a String"	1967	3	
Ed Sheeran	England	"Sing"	2014	1	
Ed Sheeran	England	"Thinking Out Loud"	2014	2	
Ed Sheeran	England	"Shape of You"	2017	14	Biggest selling single of 2017, the 2010s decade, and all time including streaming data
Ed Sheeran	England	"Perfect"	2017	6	2017's Christmas number one
Ed Sheeran	England	"River"	2018	1	Eminem featuring Ed Sheeran
Ed Sheeran	England	"I Don't Care"	2019	8	Ed Sheeran and Justin Bieber
Ed Sheeran	England	"Beautiful People"	2019	1	Ed Sheeran featuring Khalid
Ed Sheeran	England	"Take Me Back to London"	2019	5	Ed Sheeran featuring Stormzy, remix featuring Jaykae and Aitch
Ed Sheeran	England	"Own It"	2020	3	Stormzy featuring Ed Sheeran and Burna Boy
Ed Sheeran	England	"Bad Habits"	2021	11	Biggest selling single of 2021
Ed Sheeran	England	"Shivers"	2021	4	
Ed Sheeran	England	"Merry Christmas"	2021	3	Ed Sheeran and Elton John
Ed Sheeran	England	"Sausage Rolls for Everyone"	2021	1	LadBaby featuring Ed Sheeran and Elton John
Ed Sheeran	England	"Eyes Closed"	2023	1	
Anne Shelton	England	"Lay Down Your Arms"	1956	4	
Shout for England	England	"Shout"	2010	2	Shout for England featuring Dizzee Rascal and James Corden
Showaddywaddy	England	"Under the Moon of Love"	1976	3	
Sia	Australia	"Titanium"	2012	1	David Guetta featuring Sia
Sigala	England	"Easy Love"	2015	1	
Sigma	England	"Nobody to Love"	2014	1	
Sigma	England	"Changing"	2014	1	Sigma featuring Paloma Faith
Simon & Garfunkel	United States	"Bridge over Troubled Water"	1970	3	
Eva Simons	Netherlands	"This Is Love"	2012	1	will.i.am featuring Eva Simons
Simple Minds	Scotland	"Belfast Child"	1989	2	
Simply Red	England	"Fairground"	1995	4	
The Simpsons	United States	"Do the Bartman"	1991	3	
Frank Sinatra	United States	"Three Coins in the Fountain"	1954	3	
Frank Sinatra	United States	"Strangers in the Night"	1966	3	
Frank Sinatra	United States	"Somethin' Stupid"	1967	2	Frank and Nancy Sinatra
Nancy Sinatra	United States	"These Boots Are Made for Walkin'"	1966	4	
Nancy Sinatra	United States	"Somethin' Stupid"	1967	2	Frank and Nancy Sinatra
Sister Sledge	United States	"Frankie"	1985	4	
Frank Skinner	England	"Three Lions"	1996	3	Baddiel, Skinner and The Lightning Seeds
Frank Skinner	England	"3 Lions '98'"	1998	3	Baddiel, Skinner and The Lightning Seeds
Slade	England	"Coz I Luv You"	1971	4	
Slade	England	"Take Me Bak 'Ome"	1972	1	
Slade	England	"Mama Weer All Crazee Now"	1972	3	
Slade	England	"Cum On Feel the Noize"	1973	4	
Slade	England	"Skweeze Me, Pleeze Me"	1973	3	
Slade	England	"Merry Xmas Everybody"	1973	5	1973's Christmas number one
Slik	Scotland	"Forever and Ever"	1976	1	
Small Faces	England	"All or Nothing"	1966	1	
Sam Smith	England	"La La La"	2013	1	Naughty Boy featuring Sam Smith
Sam Smith	England	"Money on My Mind"	2014	1	
Sam Smith	England	"Stay with Me"	2014	1	
Sam Smith	England	"Lay Me Down"	2015	2	Sam Smith featuring John Legend
Sam Smith	England	"Writing's on the Wall"	2015	1	
Sam Smith	England	"Too Good at Goodbyes"	2017	3	
Sam Smith	England	"Promises"	2018	6	Calvin Harris and Sam Smith
Sam Smith	England	"Unholy"	2022	4	Sam Smith and Kim Petras
Will Smith	United States	"Men in Black"	1997	4	Has another number one as part of DJ Jazzy Jeff & the Fresh Prince
Snap!	Germany	"The Power"	1990	2	
Snap!	Germany	"Rhythm Is a Dancer"	1992	6	
David Sneddon	Scotland	"Stop Living the Lie"	2003	2	
Snoop Dogg	United States	"California Gurls"	2010	2	Katy Perry featuring Snoop Dogg
So Solid Crew	England	"21 Seconds"	2001	1	
Soft Cell	England	"Tainted Love"	1981	2	
Sonia	England	"You'll Never Stop Me Loving You"	1989	2	
Sonique	England	"It Feels So Good"	2000	3	
Sonny & Cher	United States	"I Got You Babe"	1965	2	
David Soul	United States	"Don't Give Up On Us"	1977	4	
David Soul	United States	"Silver Lady"	1977	3	
Soul II Soul	England	"Back to Life (However Do You Want Me)"	1989	4	
Spacedust	England	"Gym and Tonic"	1998	1	
Spandau Ballet	England	"True"	1983	4	
Britney Spears	United States	"...Baby One More Time"	1999	2	Biggest selling single of 1999
Britney Spears	United States	"Born to Make You Happy"	2000	1	
Britney Spears	United States	"Oops!... I Did It Again"	2000	1	
Britney Spears	United States	"Toxic"	2004	1	
Britney Spears	United States	"Everytime"	2004	1	
Britney Spears	United States	"Scream & Shout"	2013	2	will.i.am featuring Britney Spears
The Specials	England	Too Much Too Young – The Special A.K.A. Live!	1980	2	The Special A.K.A.
The Specials	England	"Ghost Town"	1981	3	
Spice Girls	England	"Wannabe"	1996	7	
Spice Girls	England	"Say You'll Be There"	1996	2	
Spice Girls	England	"2 Become 1"	1996	3	1996's Christmas number one
Spice Girls	England	"Mama" / "Who Do You Think You Are"	1997	3	
Spice Girls	England	"Spice Up Your Life"	1997	1	
Spice Girls	England	"Too Much"	1997	2	1997's Christmas number one
Spice Girls	England	"Viva Forever"	1998	2	
Spice Girls	England	"Goodbye"	1998	1	1998's Christmas number one
Spice Girls	England	"Holler" / "Let Love Lead the Way"	2000	1	
Spiller	Italy	"Groovejet (If This Ain't Love)"	2000	1	Spiller (lead vocals by Sophie Ellis-Bextor)
Sienna Spiro	England	"Great Expectation"	2026	3	
Spitting Image	England	"The Chicken Song"	1986	3	
Dusty Springfield	England	"You Don't Have to Say You Love Me"	1966	1	
Jo Stafford	United States	"You Belong to Me"	1953	1	
Lisa Stansfield	England	"All Around the World"	1989	2	
Lisa Stansfield	England	Five Live	1993	3	George Michael and Queen with Lisa Stansfield
Alvin Stardust	England	"Jealous Mind"	1974	1	
The Stargazers	England	"Broken Wings"	1953	1	
The Stargazers	England	"I See the Moon"	1954	6	
The Stargazers	England	"The Finger of Suspicion"	1955	3	Dickie Valentine with The Stargazers
Kay Starr	United States	"Comes A-Long A-Love"	1953	1	
Kay Starr	United States	"Rock and Roll Waltz"	1956	1	
Starship	United States	"Nothing's Gonna Stop Us Now"	1987	4	
Status Quo	England	"Down Down"	1975	1	
Tommy Steele	England	"Singing the Blues"	1957	1	
Steps	England / Wales	"Heartbeat" / "Tragedy"	1999	1	
Steps	England / Wales	"Stomp"	2000	1	
Stereophonics	Wales	"Dakota"	2005	1	
Ray Stevens	United States	"The Streak"	1974	1	
Dave Stewart	England	"It's My Party"	1981	4	Dave Stewart and Barbara Gaskin
Rod Stewart	England	"Maggie May" / "Reason to Believe"	1971	5	
Rod Stewart	England	"You Wear It Well"	1972	1	
Rod Stewart	England	"Sailing"	1975	4	
Rod Stewart	England	"I Don't Want to Talk About It" / "The First Cut Is the Deepest"	1977	4	
Rod Stewart	England	"Da Ya Think I'm Sexy?"	1978	1	
Rod Stewart	England	"Baby Jane"	1983	3	
Stiltskin	Scotland	"Inside"	1994	1	
Stock Aitken Waterman	England	"Ferry Cross the Mersey"	1989	3	Gerry Marsden, Paul McCartney, Holly Johnson, The Christians and Stock Aitken Waterman; Have more number ones as producers
Avery Storm	United States	"Nasty Girl"	2006	2	The Notorious B.I.G. featuring Diddy, Nelly, Jagged Edge and Avery Storm
Storm Queen	United States	"Look Right Through"	2013	1	Remixed by MK
Stormzy	England	"Vossi Bop"	2019	2	
Stormzy	England	"Take Me Back to London"	2019	5	Ed Sheeran featuring Stormzy, remix featuring Jaykae and Aitch
Stormzy	England	"Own It"	2020	3	Stormzy featuring Ed Sheeran and Burna Boy
Stormzy	England	"Backbone"	2024	2	Chase & Status and Stormzy
The Streets	England	"Dry Your Eyes"	2004	1	
Barbra Streisand	United States	"Woman in Love"	1980	3	
Harry Styles	England	"Sign of the Times"	2017	1	Has more number ones with One Direction
Harry Styles	England	"As It Was"	2022	10	Biggest-selling single of 2022
Harry Styles	England	"Aperture"	2026	1	
Harry Styles	England	"American Girls"	2026	1	
The Stylistics	United States	"Can't Give You Anything (But My Love)"	1975	3	
Sugababes	England	"Freak Like Me"	2002	1	
Sugababes	England	"Round Round"	2002	1	
Sugababes	England	"Hole in the Head"	2003	1	
Sugababes	England	"Push the Button"	2005	3	
Sugababes	England	"Walk This Way"	2007	1	Sugababes vs. Girls Aloud
Sugababes	England	"About You Now"	2007	4	
Donna Summer	United States	"I Feel Love"	1977	4	
The Supremes	United States	"Baby Love"	1964	2	
Survivor	United States	"Eye of the Tiger"	1982	4	
Swedish House Mafia	Sweden	"Don't You Worry Child"	2012	1	Swedish House Mafia featuring John Martin
The Sweet	England	"Block Buster!"	1973	5	
Sweet Sensation	England	"Sad Sweet Dreamer"	1974	1	
Sally Sweetland	United States	"I'm Walking Behind You"	1953	1	Eddie Fisher featuring Sally Sweetland
Taylor Swift	United States	"Look What You Made Me Do"	2017	2	
Taylor Swift	United States	"Anti-Hero"	2022	6	
Taylor Swift	United States	"Is It Over Now?"	2023	1	
Taylor Swift	United States	"Fortnight"	2024	1	Taylor Swift featuring Post Malone
Taylor Swift	United States	"The Fate of Ophelia"	2025	7	
Taylor Swift	United States	"Opalite"	2026	1	
Taylor Swift	United States	"I Knew It, I Knew You"	2026	2	
Taylor Swift	United States	"Patient Zero"	2026	3	

== T ==
Back to top

Artist	Country	Number-one single(s)	Year	Weeks at #1	Notes
T. Rex	England	"Hot Love"	1971	6	
T. Rex	England	"Get It On"	1971	4	
T. Rex	England	"Telegram Sam"	1972	2	
T. Rex	England	"Metal Guru"	1972	4	
Take That	England	"Pray"	1993	4	
Take That	England	"Relight My Fire"	1993	2	Take That featuring Lulu
Take That	England	"Babe"	1993	1	
Take That	England	"Everything Changes"	1994	2	
Take That	England	"Sure"	1994	2	
Take That	England	"Back for Good"	1995	4	
Take That	England	"Never Forget"	1995	3	
Take That	England	"How Deep Is Your Love"	1996	3	
Take That	England	"Patience"	2006	4	
Take That	England	"Shine"	2007	2	
Take That	England	"Greatest Day"	2008	1	
Take That	England	"These Days"	2014	1	
The Tamperer featuring Maya	Italy	"Feel It"	1998	1	
The Tams	United States	"Hey Girl Don't Bother Me"	1971	3	
t.A.T.u.	Russia	"All the Things She Said"	2003	4	
The Teenagers	United States	"Why Do Fools Fall in Love"	1956	3	
Teletubbies	England	"Teletubbies say "Eh-oh!""	1997	2	
The Temperance Seven	England	"You're Driving Me Crazy"	1961	1	
Tems	Nigeria	"Raindance"	2026	2	Dave and Tems
Robin Thicke	United States	"Blurred Lines"	2013	5	Robin Thicke featuring T.I. and Pharrell, biggest selling single of 2013
Sandi Thom	Scotland	"I Wish I Was a Punk Rocker (With Flowers in My Hair)"	2006	1	
The Three Degrees	United States	"When Will I See You Again"	1974	2	
Thunderclap Newman	England	"Something in the Air"	1969	3	
T.I.	United States	"Blurred Lines"	2013	5	Robin Thicke featuring T.I. and Pharrell
Tiffany	United States	"I Think We're Alone Now"	1988	3	
Tight Fit	England	"The Lion Sleeps Tonight"	1982	3	
Bryson Tiller	United States	"Wild Thoughts"	2017	1	DJ Khaled featuring Rihanna and Bryson Tiller
Johnny Tillotson	United States	"Poetry in Motion"	1961	2	
Timbaland	United States	"Give It to Me"	2007	1	Timbaland featuring Nelly Furtado and Justin Timberlake
Timbaland	United States	"The Way I Are"	2007	2	Timbaland featuring Keri Hilson
Justin Timberlake	United States	"SexyBack"	2006	1	
Justin Timberlake	United States	"Give It to Me"	2007	1	Timbaland featuring Nelly Furtado and Justin Timberlake
Justin Timberlake	United States	"4 Minutes"	2008	4	Madonna featuring Justin Timberlake
Justin Timberlake	United States	"Mirrors"	2013	3	Also provides uncredited vocals on "Where is the Love?" by the Black Eyed Peas
Tinchy Stryder	Ghana / England	"Number 1"	2009	3	Tinchy Stryder featuring N-Dubz
Tinchy Stryder	Ghana / England	"Never Leave You"	2009	1	Tinchy Stryder featuring Amelle Berrabah
The Ting Tings	England	"That's Not My Name"	2008	1	
Tinie Tempah	England	"Pass Out"	2010	2	
Tinie Tempah	England	"Written in the Stars"	2010	1	Tinie Tempah featuring Eric Turner
Tinie Tempah	England	"R.I.P"	2012	2	Rita Ora featuring Tinie Tempah
Tinie Tempah	England	"Tsunami (Jump)"	2014	1	Dvbbs and Borgeous featuring Tinie Tempah
Tinie Tempah	England	"Crazy Stupid Love"	2014	1	Cheryl featuring Tinie Tempah
Tinie Tempah	England	"Not Letting Go"	2015	1	Tinie Tempah featuring Jess Glynne
Tinie Tempah	England	"Turn the Music Louder (Rumble)"	2015	1	KDA featuring Tinie Tempah and Katy B
Cara Tivey	England	"She's Leaving Home"	1988	4	Billy Bragg featuring Cara Tivey
Don Toliver	United States	"Lemonade"	2020	1	Internet Money, Gunna, Don Toliver and Nav
Tomcraft	Germany	"Loneliness"	2003	1	
Tones and I	Australia	"Dance Monkey"	2019	11	
The Tornados	England	"Telstar"	1962	5	
T'Pau	England	"China in Your Hand"	1987	5	600th number one single
Meghan Trainor	United States	"All About That Bass"	2014	4	
Meghan Trainor	United States	"Marvin Gaye"	2015	1	Charlie Puth featuring Meghan Trainor
John Travolta	United States	"You're the One That I Want"	1978	9	John Travolta and Olivia Newton-John
John Travolta	United States	"Summer Nights"	1978	7	John Travolta and Olivia Newton-John
The Tremeloes	England	"Do You Love Me"	1963	3	Brian Poole and the Tremeloes
The Tremeloes	England	"Silence Is Golden"	1967	3	
Jackie Trent	England	"Where Are You Now"	1965	1	
The Troggs	England	"With a Girl Like You"	1966	2	
Tubeway Army	England	"Are "Friends" Electric?"	1979	4	
Tulisa	England	"Young"	2012	1	Has another number one with N-Dubz
Eric Turner	United States	"Written in the Stars"	2010	1	Tinie Tempah featuring Eric Turner
Conway Twitty	United States	"It's Only Make Believe"	1958	5	1958's Christmas number one
Bonnie Tyler	Wales	"Total Eclipse of the Heart"	1983	2	
The Tymes	United States	"Ms Grace"	1975	1	
Typically Tropical	England	"Barbados"	1975	1	

== U ==
Back to top

Artist	Country	Number-one single(s)	Year	Weeks at #1	Notes
U2	Ireland	"Desire"	1988	1	
U2	Ireland	"The Fly"	1991	1	
U2	Ireland	"Discothèque"	1997	1	
U2	Ireland	"Beautiful Day"	2000	1	
U2	Ireland	"Take Me to the Clouds Above"	2004	2	LMC vs. U2
U2	Ireland	"Vertigo"	2004	1	
U2	Ireland	"Sometimes You Can't Make It on Your Own"	2005	1	
UB40	England	"Red Red Wine"	1983	3	
UB40	England	"I Got You Babe"	1985	1	UB40 and Chrissie Hynde
UB40	England	"(I Can't Help) Falling in Love With You"	1993	2	
Unit 4 + 2	England	"Concrete and Clay"	1965	1	
Midge Ure	Scotland	"If I Was"	1985	1	Has another number one with Slik
USA for Africa		"We Are the World"	1985	2	
Usher	United States	"You Make Me Wanna..."	1998	1	
Usher	United States	"Yeah!"	2004	2	Usher featuring Lil Jon and Ludacris
Usher	United States	"Burn"	2004	2	
Usher	United States	"OMG"	2010	1	Usher featuring will.i.am

== V ==
Back to top

Artist	Country	Number-one single(s)	Year	Weeks at #1	Notes
Holly Valance	Australia	"Kiss Kiss"	2002	1	
Ricky Valance	Wales	"Tell Laura I Love Her"	1960	3	
Dickie Valentine	England	"The Finger of Suspicion"	1955	3	Dickie Valentine and The Stargazers
Dickie Valentine	England	"Christmas Alphabet"	1955	3	1955's Christmas number one
Armand van Helden	United States	"You Don't Know Me"	1999	1	Armand van Helden featuring Duane Harden
Armand van Helden	United States	"Bonkers"	2009	2	Dizzee Rascal and Armand van Helden
Vanilla Ice	United States	"Ice Ice Baby"	1990	4	
Various Artists		"Perfect Day"	1997	3	Released as a BBC promotional film, then as a charity single for Children in Need.
Frankie Vaughan	England	"The Garden of Eden"	1957	3	
Frankie Vaughan	England	"Tower Of Strength"	1961	4	
Vengaboys	Netherlands	"Boom, Boom, Boom, Boom!!"	1999	1	
Vengaboys	Netherlands	"We're Going to Ibiza!"	1999	1	
The Verve	England	"The Drugs Don't Work"	1997	1	
Diana Vickers	England	"Once"	2010	1	
Village People	United States	"Y.M.C.A."	1978	3	

== W ==
Back to top

Artist	Country	Number-one single(s)	Year	Weeks at #1	Notes
The Walker Brothers	United States	"Make It Easy on Yourself"	1965	1	
The Walker Brothers	United States	"The Sun Ain't Gonna Shine Anymore"	1966	4	
Wamdue Project	United States	"King of My Castle"	1999	1	
The Wanted	England / Ireland	"All Time Low"	2010	1	
The Wanted	England / Ireland	"Glad You Came"	2011	2	
Wanz	United States	"Thrift Shop"	2013	1	Macklemore & Ryan Lewis featuring Wanz
Anita Ward	United States	"Ring My Bell"	1979	2	
Shayne Ward	England	"That's My Goal"	2005	4	2005's Christmas number one
Alex Warren	United States	"Ordinary"	2025	13	
Tion Wayne	England	"Body"	2021	3	Tion Wayne and Russ Millions, remix featuring ArrDee, Bugzy Malone, Darkoo, Fivio Foreign, Buni, E1 and ZT
The Weeknd	Canada	"Blinding Lights"	2020	8	Biggest selling single of 2020
Florence Welch	England	"Sweet Nothing"	2012	1	Calvin Harris featuring Florence Welch, has another number one with Florence and the Machine
Kanye West	United States	"Stronger"	2007	2	
Kanye West	United States	"American Boy"	2008	4	Estelle featuring Kanye West
Kanye West	United States	"Run This Town"	2009	1	Jay-Z featuring Rihanna and Kanye West
Westlife	Ireland	"Swear It Again"	1999	2	
Westlife	Ireland	"If I Let You Go"	1999	1	
Westlife	Ireland	"Flying Without Wings"	1999	1	
Westlife	Ireland	"I Have a Dream" / "Seasons in the Sun"	1999	4	1999's Christmas number one
Westlife	Ireland	"Fool Again"	2000	1	
Westlife	Ireland	"Against All Odds"	2000	2	Mariah Carey featuring Westlife
Westlife	Ireland	"My Love"	2000	1	
Westlife	Ireland	"Uptown Girl"	2001	1	
Westlife	Ireland	"Queen of My Heart"	2001	1	
Westlife	Ireland	"World of Our Own"	2002	1	
Westlife	Ireland	"Unbreakable"	2002	1	
Westlife	Ireland	"Mandy"	2003	1	
Westlife	Ireland	"You Raise Me Up"	2005	2	
Westlife	Ireland	"The Rose"	2006	1	
Wet Wet Wet	Scotland	"With a Little Help from My Friends"	1988	4	Double A-Side with "She's Leaving Home" by Billy Bragg featuring Cara Tivey
Wet Wet Wet	Scotland	"Goodnight Girl"	1992	4	
Wet Wet Wet	Scotland	"Love Is All Around"	1994	15	Biggest selling single of 1994
Wham!	England	"Wake Me Up Before You Go-Go"	1984	2	
Wham!	England	"Freedom"	1984	3	
Wham!	England	"I'm Your Man"	1985	2	
Wham!	England	"The Edge of Heaven"	1986	2	
Wham!	England	"Last Christmas"	2021	12	2023's and 2024's Christmas number one
Whigfield	Denmark	"Saturday Night"	1994	4	
Barry White	United States	"You're the First, the Last, My Everything"	1974	2	
White Town	India / England	"Your Woman"	1997	1	
David Whitfield	England	"Answer Me"	1953	2	
David Whitfield	England	"Cara Mia"	1954	10	David Whitfield with Mantovani and his Orchestra
Slim Whitman	United States	"Rose Marie"	1955	11	Biggest selling single of 1955
Wiley	England	"Heatwave"	2012	2	Wiley featuring Ms D, has more number ones with Roll Deep
will.i.am	United States	"OMG"	2010	1	Usher featuring will.i.am
will.i.am	United States	"This Is Love"	2012	1	will.i.am featuring Eva Simons
will.i.am	United States	"Hall of Fame"	2012	2	The Script featuring will.i.am
will.i.am	United States	"Scream & Shout"	2013	2	will.i.am featuring Britney Spears
will.i.am	United States	"It's My Birthday"	2014	1	will.i.am featuring Cody Wise, has other number ones with the Black Eyed Peas
Andy Williams	United States	"Butterfly"	1957	2	
Danny Williams	South Africa	"Moon River"	1961	2	1961's Christmas number one
Deniece Williams	United States	"Free"	1977	2	
Hayley Williams	United States	"Airplanes"	2010	1	B.o.B featuring Hayley Williams
Pharrell Williams	United States	"Get Lucky"	2013	4	Daft Punk featuring Pharrell Williams and Nile Rodgers
Pharrell Williams	United States	"Blurred Lines"	2013	5	Robin Thicke featuring T.I. and Pharrell
Pharrell Williams	United States	"Happy"	2013	4	Biggest selling single of 2014
Pharrell Williams	United States	"Feels"	2017	1	Calvin Harris featuring Pharrell Williams, Katy Perry and Big Sean
Robbie Williams	England	"Millennium"	1998	1	
Robbie Williams	England	"She's the One" / "It's Only Us"	1999	1	
Robbie Williams	England	"Rock DJ"	2000	1	
Robbie Williams	England	"Eternity/The Road to Mandalay"	2001	2	
Robbie Williams	England	"Somethin' Stupid"	2001	3	Robbie Williams and Nicole Kidman, 2001's Christmas number one
Robbie Williams	England	"Radio"	2004	1	
Robbie Williams	England	"Candy"	2012	2	
Chris Willis	United States	"Gettin' Over You"	2010	1	David Guetta and Chris Willis featuring Fergie and LMFAO
Jackie Wilson	United States	"Reet Petite"	1986	4	Posthumous number one, 1986's Christmas number one
BeBe Winans	United States	"I Wanna Be the Only One"	1997	1	Eternal featuring BeBe Winans
Mario Winans	United States	"I Don't Wanna Know"	2004	2	Mario Winans featuring Enya and P. Diddy
Wings	England / United States	"Mull of Kintyre" / "Girls' School"	1977	9	Biggest selling single of 1977 and the 1970s decade, 1977's Christmas number one
St Winifred's School Choir	England	"There's No One Quite Like Grandma"	1980	2	1980's Christmas number one, Also provided backing vocals on "Matchstalk Men and Matchstalk Cats and Dogs" by Brian and Michael
Cody Wise	United States	"It's My Birthday"	2014	1	will.i.am featuring Cody Wise
Wizkid	Nigeria	"One Dance"	2016	15	Drake featuring Wizkid and Kyla
Wizzard	England	"See My Baby Jive"	1973	4	
Wizzard	England	"Angel Fingers"	1973	1	
Stevie Wonder	United States	"Ebony and Ivory"	1982	3	Paul McCartney and Stevie Wonder
Stevie Wonder	United States	"I Just Called to Say I Love You"	1984	6	
The Wonder Stuff	England	"Dizzy"	1991	2	Vic Reeves and The Wonder Stuff
Wretch 32	England	"Don't Go"	2011	1	Wretch 32 featuring Josh Kumra
The Wurzels	England	"Combine Harvester"	1976	2	
Tammy Wynette	United States	"Stand by Your Man"	1975	3	

== X ==
Back to top

Artist	Country	Number-one single(s)	Year	Weeks at #1	Notes
The X Factor Finalists 2008		"Hero"	2008	3	
The X Factor Finalists 2009		"You Are Not Alone"	2009	1	
The X Factor Finalists 2010		"Heroes"	2010	2	
The X Factor Finalists 2011		"Wishing on a Star"	2011	1	The X Factor Finalists 2011 featuring JLS and One Direction
Charli XCX	England	"I Love It"	2013	1	Icona Pop featuring Charli XCX
Charli XCX	England	"Guess"	2024	1	Charli XCX featuring Billie Eilish

== Y ==
Back to top

Artist	Country	Number-one single(s)	Year	Weeks at #1	Notes
Daddy Yankee	Puerto Rico	"Despacito"	2017	11	Luis Fonsi and Daddy Yankee featuring Justin Bieber
Yanou	Germany	"Heaven"	2002	1	DJ Sammy and Yanou featuring Do, has another number one with Cascada
Yazz	England	"The Only Way Is Up"	1988	5	Yazz and the Plastic Population
Years & Years	England	"King"	2015	1	
Yolanda Be Cool	Australia	"We No Speak Americano"	2010	1	Yolanda Be Cool and DCUP
Jimmy Young	England	"Unchained Melody"	1955	3	
Jimmy Young	England	"The Man from Laramie"	1955	4	
Lola Young	England	"Messy"	2025	4	
Paul Young	England	"Wherever I Lay My Hat (That's My Home)"	1983	3	
Will Young	England	"Anything is Possible" / "Evergreen"	2002	3	Biggest-selling single of 2002 and the 2000s decade
Will Young	England	"Light My Fire	2002	2	
Will Young	England	"The Long and Winding Road"	2002	2	Will Young and Gareth Gates
Will Young	England	"Leave Right Now"	2003	2	
The Young Ones	England	"Living Doll"	1986	3	Cliff Richard and The Young Ones featuring Hank Marvin
Young Thug	United States	"Havana"	2017	5	Camila Cabello featuring Young Thug

== Z ==
Back to top

Artist	Country	Number-one single(s)	Year	Weeks at #1	Notes
Zager and Evans	United States	"In the Year 2525"	1969	3	
Zayn	England	"Pillowtalk"	2016	1	Has more number ones with One Direction
David Zowie	England	"House Every Weekend"	2015	1	First number one when the chart was revealed on Friday

== See also ==
- List of artists who reached number one on the UK Singles Downloads Chart
