= List of number-one urban albums of 2022 (Australia) =

ARIA Charts number-one urban albums of 2022 < 2021 2023 >

Other Australian number-one charts of 2022
- albums
- singles
- urban singles
- dance singles
- club tracks
- digital tracks
- streaming tracks

Top Australian singles and albums of 2022
- Triple J Hottest 100
- top 25 singles
- top 25 albums

This is a list of albums that reached number-one on the ARIA Urban Albums Chart in 2022. The ARIA Urban Albums Chart is a weekly chart that ranks the best-performing urban albums in Australia. It is published by the Australian Recording Industry Association (ARIA), an organisation that collects music data for the weekly ARIA Charts. To be eligible to appear on the chart, the recording must be an album of a predominantly urban nature.

== Chart history ==
Issue date	Album	Artist(s)	Reference
3 January	Planet Her	Doja Cat	
10 January	Planet Her	Doja Cat	
17 January	Dawn FM	The Weeknd	
24 January	Dawn FM	The Weeknd	
31 January	Dawn FM	The Weeknd	
7 February	Dawn FM	The Weeknd	
14 February	Dawn FM	The Weeknd	
21 February	Antihero	Huskii	
28 February	Planet Her	Doja Cat	
7 March	23	Central Cee	
14 March	Planet Her	Doja Cat	
21 March	Planet Her	Doja Cat	
28 March	Planet Her	Doja Cat	
4 April	Planet Her	Doja Cat	
11 April	Planet Her	Doja Cat	
18 April	Planet Her	Doja Cat	
25 April	Planet Her	Doja Cat	
2 May	Planet Her	Doja Cat	
9 May	I Never Liked You	Future	
16 May	Come Home the Kids Miss You	Jack Harlow	
23 May	Mr. Morale & the Big Steppers	Kendrick Lamar	
30 May	Mr. Morale & the Big Steppers	Kendrick Lamar	
6 June	Mr. Morale & the Big Steppers	Kendrick Lamar	
13 June	Twelve Carat Toothache	Post Malone	
20 June	Twelve Carat Toothache	Post Malone	
27 June	Honestly, Nevermind	Drake	
4 July	Honestly, Nevermind	Drake	
11 July	Honestly, Nevermind	Drake	
18 July	Honestly, Nevermind	Drake	
25 July	Special	Lizzo	
1 August	Planet Her	Doja Cat	
8 August	Planet Her	Doja Cat	
15 August	Curtain Call 2	Eminem	
22 August	Curtain Call 2	Eminem	
29 August	Curtain Call 2	Eminem	
5 September	An Evening with Silk Sonic	Silk Sonic	
12 September	Mr. Morale & the Big Steppers	Kendrick Lamar	
19 September	So Above, So Below	Sampa the Great	
26 September	Curtain Call 2	Eminem	
3 October	This Was Tomorrow	Seth Sentry	
10 October	Melt My Eyez See Your Future	Denzel Curry	
17 October	Curtain Call	Eminem	
24 October	It's Only Me	Lil Baby	
31 October	Curtain Call	Eminem	
7 November	Curtain Call	Eminem	
14 November	Her Loss	Drake and 21 Savage	
21 November	Her Loss	Drake and 21 Savage	
28 November	Her Loss	Drake and 21 Savage	
5 December	Her Loss	Drake and 21 Savage	
12 December	Heroes & Villains	Metro Boomin	
19 December	SOS	SZA	
26 December	SOS	SZA	

== See also ==
- 2022 in music
- List of number-one albums of 2022 (Australia)
