= List of number-one country albums of 2022 (Australia) =

ARIA Charts number-one country albums of 2022 < 2021 2023 >

Other Australian number-one charts of 2022
- albums
- singles
- urban singles
- dance singles
- club tracks
- digital tracks
- streaming tracks

Top Australian singles and albums of 2022
- Triple J Hottest 100
- top 25 singles
- top 25 albums

These are the Australian Country number-one albums of 2022, per the ARIA Charts.

Issue date	Album	Artist
3 January	Red (Taylor's Version)	Taylor Swift
10 January	Red (Taylor's Version)	Taylor Swift
17 January	Red (Taylor's Version)	Taylor Swift
24 January	Red (Taylor's Version)	Taylor Swift
31 January	Red (Taylor's Version)	Taylor Swift
7 February	Red (Taylor's Version)	Taylor Swift
14 February	Red (Taylor's Version)	Taylor Swift
21 February	Red (Taylor's Version)	Taylor Swift
28 February	Red (Taylor's Version)	Taylor Swift
7 March	Red (Taylor's Version)	Taylor Swift
14 March	Red (Taylor's Version)	Taylor Swift
21 March	Red (Taylor's Version)	Taylor Swift
28 March	Red (Taylor's Version)	Taylor Swift
4 April	Red (Taylor's Version)	Taylor Swift
11 April	Red (Taylor's Version)	Taylor Swift
18 April	Red (Taylor's Version)	Taylor Swift
25 April	Wild	Kirsty Lee Akers
2 May	Red (Taylor's Version)	Taylor Swift
9 May	What You See Ain't Always What You Get	Luke Combs
16 May	What You See Ain't Always What You Get	Luke Combs
23 May	What You See Ain't Always What You Get	Luke Combs
30 May	What You See Ain't Always What You Get	Luke Combs
6 June	What You See Ain't Always What You Get	Luke Combs
13 June	What You See Ain't Always What You Get	Luke Combs
20 June	Denim & Rhinestones	Carrie Underwood
27 June	What You See Ain't Always What You Get	Luke Combs
4 July	Growin' Up	Luke Combs
11 July	Growin' Up	Luke Combs
18 July	Growin' Up	Luke Combs
25 July	Growin' Up	Luke Combs
1 August	Living for the Highlights	Amber Lawrence
8 August	Growin' Up	Luke Combs
15 August	Growin' Up	Luke Combs
22 August	50 Songs 50 Towns	Troy Cassar-Daley
29 August	Growin' Up	Luke Combs
5 September	All or Nothing	Adam Brand
12 September	Growin' Up	Luke Combs
19 September	Growin' Up	Luke Combs
26 September	Growin' Up	Luke Combs
3 October	This One's for You	Luke Combs
10 October	This One's for You	Luke Combs
17 October	This One's for You	Luke Combs
24 October	This One's for You	Luke Combs
31 October	This One's for You	Luke Combs
7 November	This One's for You	Luke Combs
14 November	This One's for You	Luke Combs
21 November	This One's for You	Luke Combs
28 November	This One's for You	Luke Combs
5 December	Red (Taylor's Version)	Taylor Swift
12 December	This One's for You	Luke Combs
19 December	This One's for You	Luke Combs
26 December	Growin' Up	Luke Combs

== See also ==
- 2022 in music
- List of number-one albums of 2022 (Australia)
