= List of top 10 singles for 2022 in Australia =

This is a list of songs that charted in the top ten of the ARIA Charts in 2022.

== Top-ten singles ==
Key

Symbol	Meaning
◁	Indicates single's top 10 entry was also its ARIA top 50 debut
(#)	2022 Year-end top 10 single position and rank

List of ARIA top ten singles that peaked in 2022
Top ten entry date	Single	Artist(s)	Peak	Peak date	Weeks in top ten	Refs.
Singles from 2021
20 December	"Do It to It"	Acraze featuring Cherish	6	31 January	5	
Singles from 2022
3 January	"Merry Christmas"	Ed Sheeran & Elton John	10	3 January	1	
10 January	"Where Are You Now" (#7)	Lost Frequencies & Calum Scott	5	7 February	15	
17 January	"Fingers Crossed" ◁	Lauren Spencer-Smith	8	17 January	1	
17 January	"Sacrifice" ◁	The Weeknd	9	17 January	1	
24 January	"We Don't Talk About Bruno"	Carolina Gaitán, Mauro Castillo, Adassa, Rhenzy Feliz, Diane Guerrero, Stephanie Beatriz and the Encanto cast	5	14 February	10	
31 January	"Elephant (Triple j Like A Version)" ◁	The Wiggles	10	31 January	1	
7 February	"Down Under"	Luude featuring Colin Hay	10	7 February	1	
28 March	"Starlight"	Dave	8	28 March	2	
11 April	"As It Was" (#1) ◁	Harry Styles	1	11 April	44	
18 April	"First Class" (#8) ◁	Jack Harlow	1	18 April	16	
2 May	"Thousand Miles" ◁	The Kid Laroi	4	2 May	8	
2 May	"Big Energy"	Latto	6	9 May	5	
16 May	"About Damn Time" (#10)	Lizzo	3	16 May	17	
23 May	"N95" ◁	Kendrick Lamar	3	23 May	1	
23 May	"Die Hard" ◁	Kendrick Lamar, Blxst and Amanda Reifer	5	23 May	1	
23 May	"United in Grief" ◁	Kendrick Lamar	7	23 May	1	
30 May	"Late Night Talking" ◁	Harry Styles	2	30 May	4	
30 May	"Matilda" ◁	Harry Styles	3	30 May	2	
30 May	"Music for a Sushi Restaurant" ◁	Harry Styles	4	30 May	1	
30 May	"Little Freak" ◁	Harry Styles	6	30 May	1	
30 May	"Daylight" ◁	Harry Styles	8	30 May	1	
30 May	"Grapejuice" ◁	Harry Styles	9	30 May	1	
30 May	"Satellite" ◁	Harry Styles	10	30 May	1	
6 June	"Running Up That Hill"	Kate Bush	1	13 June	15	
13 June	"I Like You (A Happier Song)" ◁	Post Malone featuring Doja Cat	7	13 June	7	
13 June	"Cooped Up"	Post Malone featuring Roddy Ricch	10	13 June	1	
20 June	"Glimpse of Us" ◁	Joji	1	27 June	10	
27 June	"Jimmy Cooks" ◁	Drake featuring 21 Savage	4	27 June	3	
27 June	"Vegas"	Doja Cat	4	11 July	6	
4 July	"Break My Soul"	Beyoncé	6	8 August	5	
18 July	"I Ain't Worried" (#9)	OneRepublic	2	12 September	27	
25 July	"Bad Habit"	Steve Lacy	3	15 August	17	
1 August	"Doja" ◁	Central Cee	3	8 August	4	
22 August	"Super Freaky Girl" ◁	Nicki Minaj	1	12 September	10	
29 August	"Pink Venom" ◁	Blackpink	1	29 August	2	
29 August	"Sunroof"	Nicky Youre and Dazy	8	5 September	7	
5 September	"Hold Me Closer" ◁	Elton John and Britney Spears	1	5 September	3	
12 September	"I'm Good (Blue)"	David Guetta and Bebe Rexha	1	19 September	18	
12 September	"Under the Influence"	Chris Brown	5	19 September	6	
19 September	"B.O.T.A. (Baddest of Them All)"	Eliza Rose and Interplanetary Criminal	4	26 September	9	
26 September	"Shut Down" ◁	Blackpink	5	26 September	1	
3 October	"Unholy" ◁	Sam Smith & Kim Petras	1	3 October	22	
17 October	"Cuff It"	Beyoncé	8	17 October	2	
24 October	"Miss You" ◁	Oliver Tree and Robin Schulz	4	24 October	14	
31 October	"Anti-Hero" ◁	Taylor Swift	1	31 October	32	
31 October	"Lavender Haze" ◁	Taylor Swift	2	31 October	4	
31 October	"Snow on the Beach" ◁	Taylor Swift featuring Lana Del Rey	3	31 October	2	
31 October	"Maroon" ◁	Taylor Swift	4	31 October	2	
31 October	"Midnight Rain" ◁	Taylor Swift	5	31 October	2	
31 October	"You're on Your Own, Kid" ◁	Taylor Swift	6	31 October	1	
31 October	"Bejeweled" ◁	Taylor Swift	7	7 November	2	
31 October	"Vigilante S**t" ◁	Taylor Swift	10	31 October	1	
7 November	"Lift Me Up" ◁	Rihanna	5	7 November	1	
14 November	"Rich Flex" ◁	Drake and 21 Savage	3	14 November	5	
14 November	"P***y & Millions" ◁	Drake and 21 Savage featuring Travis Scott	5	14 November	1	
14 November	"Circo Loco" ◁	Drake and 21 Savage	9	14 November	1	
14 November	"Major Distribution" ◁	Drake and 21 Savage	10	14 November	1	
21 November	"Made You Look"	Meghan Trainor	3	5 December	11	

=== 2021 peaks ===
List of ARIA top ten singles in 2022 that peaked in 2021
Top ten entry date	Single	Artist(s)	Peak	Peak date	Weeks in top ten	References
1 February	"Heat Waves" (#2)	Glass Animals	1	1 March	87	
24 May	"Good 4 U" ◁	Olivia Rodrigo	1	31 May	22	
19 July	"Stay" (#3) ◁	The Kid Laroi & Justin Bieber	1	19 July	53	
2 August	"Industry Baby"	Lil Nas X & Jack Harlow	4	9 August	31	
23 August	"Cold Heart (Pnau remix)" (#4) ◁	Elton John & Dua Lipa	1	8 November	40	
5 July	"Bad Habits" (#5) ◁	Ed Sheeran	1	5 July	44	
20 September	"Shivers" (#6) ◁	Ed Sheeran	2	8 November	34	
27 September	"Thats What I Want" ◁	Lil Nas X	7	27 September	15	
25 October	"Easy On Me" ◁	Adele	1	25 October	15	
6 December	"abcdefu"	Gayle	2	20 December	21	

=== 2023 peaks ===
List of ARIA top ten singles in 2022 that peaked in 2023
Top ten entry date	Single	Artist(s)	Peak	Peak date	Weeks in top ten	References
31 October	"Karma" ◁	Taylor Swift featuring Ice Spice	2	5 June	5	
12 December	"Creepin'" ◁	Metro Boomin, The Weeknd and 21 Savage	7	23 January	12	
19 December	"Kill Bill" ◁	SZA	1	16 January	27	

=== Holiday season ===
Holiday titles first making the ARIA Top 50 top ten during the 2021–22 holiday season
Top ten entry date	Single	Artist(s)	Peak	Peak date	Weeks in top ten	Ref.
3 January 2022	"Rockin' Around the Christmas Tree"	Brenda Lee	2	2 January 2023	7	

Recurring holiday titles, appearing in the ARIA Top 50 top ten in previous holiday seasons
Top ten entry date	Single	Artist(s)	Peak	Peak date	Weeks in top ten	Ref.
1 January 2018	"All I Want for Christmas Is You"	Mariah Carey	1	31 December 2018	21	
31 December 2018	"Last Christmas"	Wham!	2	28 December 2020	13	
30 December 2019	"It's Beginning to Look a Lot Like Christmas"	Michael Bublé	3	3 January 2022	8	
28 December 2020	"Santa Tell Me"	Ariana Grande	5	3 January 2022	6	

== See also ==
- List of number-one singles of 2022 (Australia)
