= List of Canadian Hot 100 number-one singles of 2022 =

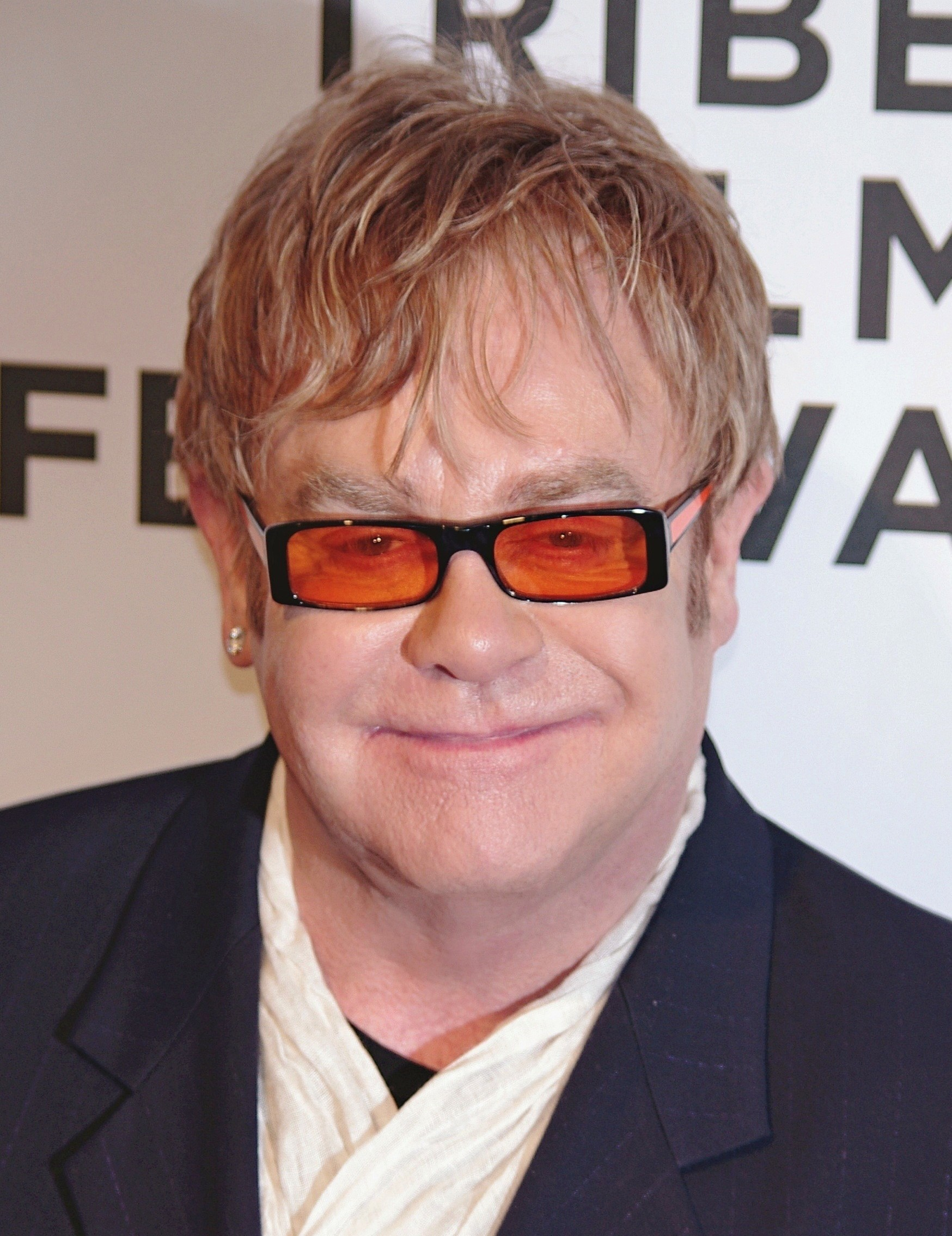
"Cold Heart (Pnau remix)" by Elton John (pictured) and Dua Lipa spent twelve consecutive weeks at number one on the Canadian Hot 100, which later ranked as the best-performing song of the year.

This is a list of the Canadian Hot 100 number-one songs from 2022. The Canadian Hot 100 is a chart ranking Canada's best-performing songs. Published by Billboard magazine and compiled by Luminate, the chart data collectively reflects each song’s weekly physical and digital sales, airplay, and streaming statistics.

== Chart history ==
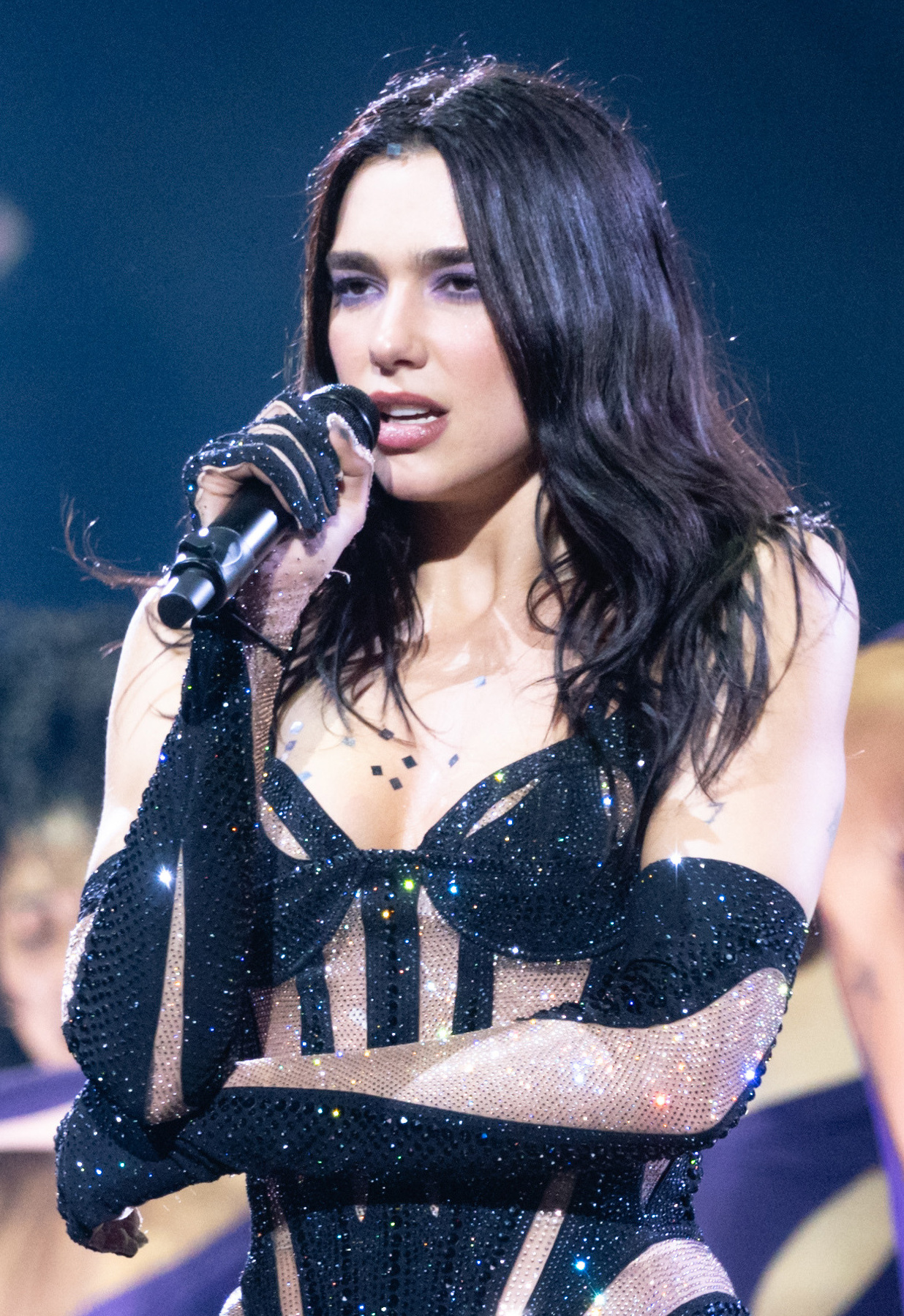
Dua Lipa (pictured) scored the best-performing song for a second consecutive year with the Elton John collaboration, "Cold Heart (Pnau remix)".

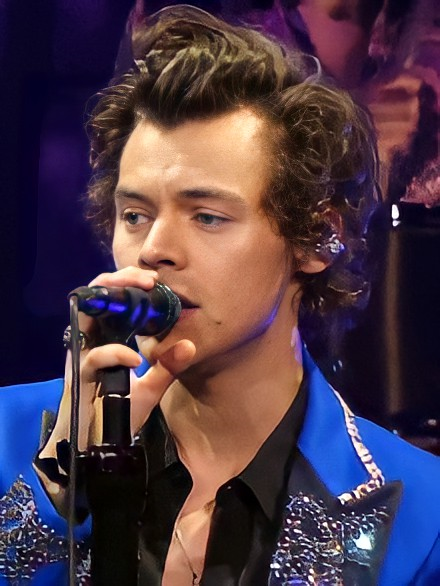
Harry Styles (pictured) earned his first number-one song with "As It Was". It spent eighteen weeks at number one, the most since Lil Nas X's "Old Town Road" in 2019.

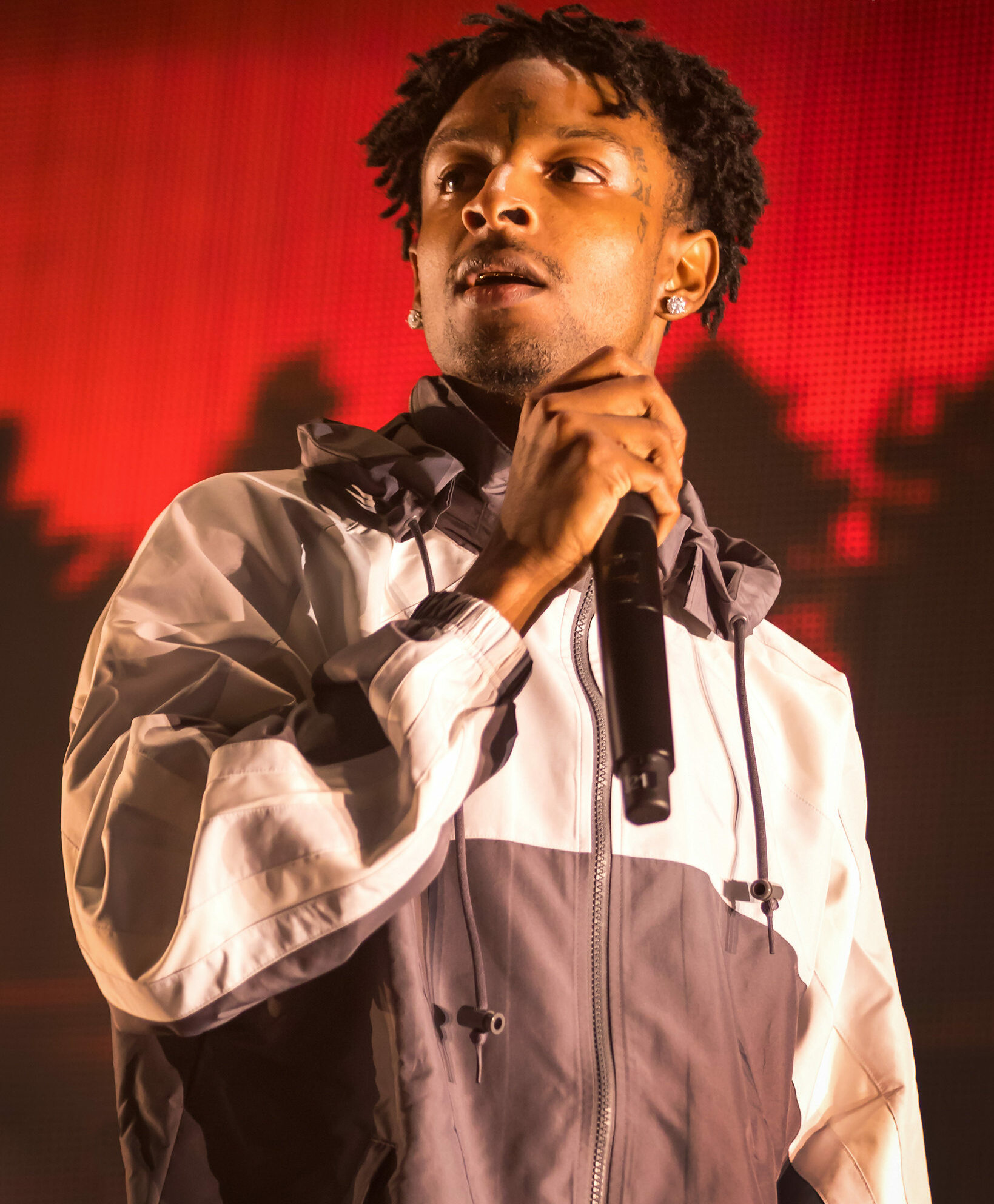
21 Savage (pictured) earned the most number-one songs of the year with three, as "Jimmy Cooks", "Rich Flex", and "Creepin'" hit number one on the chart.

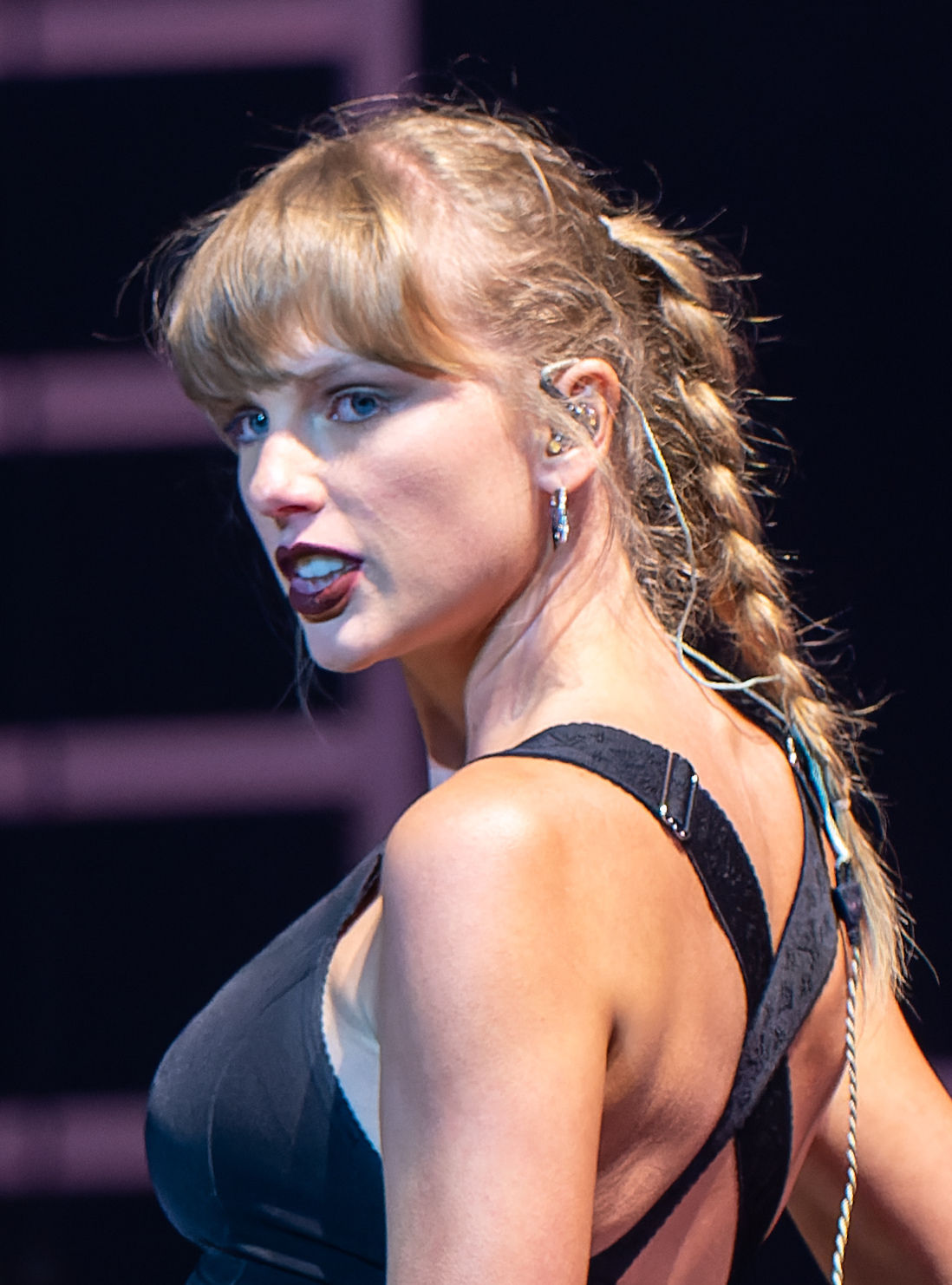
Taylor Swift (pictured) spent five weeks at number one with her single, "Anti-Hero".

Key
†	Indicates best-performing song of 2022

No.	Issue date	Song	Artist(s)	Ref.
re	January 1	"All I Want for Christmas Is You"	Mariah Carey	
177	January 8	"Cold Heart (Pnau remix)" †	Elton John and Dua Lipa	
177	January 15	"Cold Heart (Pnau remix)" †	Elton John and Dua Lipa	
177	January 22	"Cold Heart (Pnau remix)" †	Elton John and Dua Lipa	
177	January 29	"Cold Heart (Pnau remix)" †	Elton John and Dua Lipa	
177	February 5	"Cold Heart (Pnau remix)" †	Elton John and Dua Lipa	
177	February 12	"Cold Heart (Pnau remix)" †	Elton John and Dua Lipa	
177	February 19	"Cold Heart (Pnau remix)" †	Elton John and Dua Lipa	
177	February 26	"Cold Heart (Pnau remix)" †	Elton John and Dua Lipa	
177	March 5	"Cold Heart (Pnau remix)" †	Elton John and Dua Lipa	
177	March 12	"Cold Heart (Pnau remix)" †	Elton John and Dua Lipa	
177	March 19	"Cold Heart (Pnau remix)" †	Elton John and Dua Lipa	
177	March 26	"Cold Heart (Pnau remix)" †	Elton John and Dua Lipa	
178	April 2	"Heat Waves"	Glass Animals	
178	April 9	"Heat Waves"	Glass Animals	
179	April 16	"As It Was"	Harry Styles	
180	April 23	"First Class"	Jack Harlow	
re	April 30	"As It Was"	Harry Styles	
re	May 7	"As It Was"	Harry Styles	
re	May 14	"As It Was"	Harry Styles	
re	May 21	"As It Was"	Harry Styles	
re	May 28	"As It Was"	Harry Styles	
re	June 4	"As It Was"	Harry Styles	
re	June 11	"As It Was"	Harry Styles	
re	June 18	"As It Was"	Harry Styles	
re	June 25	"As It Was"	Harry Styles	
181	July 2	"Jimmy Cooks"	Drake featuring 21 Savage	
181	July 9	"Jimmy Cooks"	Drake featuring 21 Savage	
re	July 16	"As It Was"	Harry Styles	
re	July 23	"As It Was"	Harry Styles	
re	July 30	"As It Was"	Harry Styles	
re	August 6	"As It Was"	Harry Styles	
re	August 13	"As It Was"	Harry Styles	
re	August 20	"As It Was"	Harry Styles	
re	August 27	"As It Was"	Harry Styles	
re	September 3	"As It Was"	Harry Styles	
182	September 10	"Sunroof"	Nicky Youre and Dazy	
182	September 17	"Sunroof"	Nicky Youre and Dazy	
183	September 24	"I'm Good (Blue)"	David Guetta and Bebe Rexha	
183	October 1	"I'm Good (Blue)"	David Guetta and Bebe Rexha	
184	October 8	"Unholy"	Sam Smith and Kim Petras	
184	October 15	"Unholy"	Sam Smith and Kim Petras	
184	October 22	"Unholy"	Sam Smith and Kim Petras	
184	October 29	"Unholy"	Sam Smith and Kim Petras	
185	November 5	"Anti-Hero"	Taylor Swift	
185	November 12	"Anti-Hero"	Taylor Swift	
186	November 19	"Rich Flex"	Drake and 21 Savage	
re	November 26	"Anti-Hero"	Taylor Swift	
re	December 3	"Anti-Hero"	Taylor Swift	
re	December 10	"Anti-Hero"	Taylor Swift	
187	December 17	"Creepin'"	Metro Boomin, the Weeknd and 21 Savage	
re	December 24	"All I Want for Christmas Is You"	Mariah Carey	
re	December 31	"All I Want for Christmas Is You"	Mariah Carey	

== See also ==
- List of number-one albums of 2022 (Canada)
