= List of Billboard number-one dance songs of 2023 =

Billboard magazine compiled the top-performing dance songs in the United States during 2023 on the Hot Dance/Electronic Songs and the Dance/Mix Show Airplay. First published as the Hot Dance Radio Airplay in 2003, the Dance/Mix Show Airplay ranked songs based on airplay detections on dance radio, as well as mix-show plays on top 40 radio and select rhythmic radio as measured by Mediabase. Premiered in 2013, the Hot Dance/Electronic Songs is a multi-metric chart ranking songs based on streaming, sales, and airplay audience impressions from radio stations of all formats.

== Chart history ==
Key
†	Indicates top-performing dance song of 2023.

Chart history
Issue date	Hot Dance/Electronic Songs			Dance/Mix Show Airplay		
Issue date	Song	Artist(s)	Ref.	Song	Artist(s)	Ref.
January 7	"I'm Good (Blue)"†	David Guetta and Bebe Rexha		"I'm Good (Blue)"	David Guetta and Bebe Rexha	
January 14	"I'm Good (Blue)"†	David Guetta and Bebe Rexha		"I'm Good (Blue)"	David Guetta and Bebe Rexha	
January 21	"I'm Good (Blue)"†	David Guetta and Bebe Rexha		"I'm Good (Blue)"	David Guetta and Bebe Rexha	
January 28	"I'm Good (Blue)"†	David Guetta and Bebe Rexha		"I'm Good (Blue)"	David Guetta and Bebe Rexha	
February 4	"I'm Good (Blue)"†	David Guetta and Bebe Rexha		"I'm Good (Blue)"	David Guetta and Bebe Rexha	
February 11	"I'm Good (Blue)"†	David Guetta and Bebe Rexha		"I'm Good (Blue)"	David Guetta and Bebe Rexha	
February 18	"I'm Good (Blue)"†	David Guetta and Bebe Rexha		"I'm Good (Blue)"	David Guetta and Bebe Rexha	
February 25	"I'm Good (Blue)"†	David Guetta and Bebe Rexha		"Need Me Right"	Anabel Englund	
March 4	"I'm Good (Blue)"†	David Guetta and Bebe Rexha		"Need Me Right"	Anabel Englund	
March 11	"I'm Good (Blue)"†	David Guetta and Bebe Rexha		"Flowers"	Miley Cyrus	
March 18	"I'm Good (Blue)"†	David Guetta and Bebe Rexha		"Flowers"	Miley Cyrus	
March 25	"I'm Good (Blue)"†	David Guetta and Bebe Rexha		"Flowers"	Miley Cyrus	
April 1	"I'm Good (Blue)"†	David Guetta and Bebe Rexha		"Flowers"	Miley Cyrus	
April 8	"I'm Good (Blue)"†	David Guetta and Bebe Rexha		"Luv Me a Little"	Illenium and Nina Nesbitt	
April 15	"I'm Good (Blue)"†	David Guetta and Bebe Rexha		"Luv Me a Little"	Illenium and Nina Nesbitt	
April 22	"I'm Good (Blue)"†	David Guetta and Bebe Rexha		"I Go Dancing"	Frank Walker featuring Ella Henderson	
April 29	"I'm Good (Blue)"†	David Guetta and Bebe Rexha		"Luv Me a Little"	Illenium and Nina Nesbitt	
May 6	"I'm Good (Blue)"†	David Guetta and Bebe Rexha		"V I B R A T I O N"	Kaleena Zanders and Shift K3Y	
May 13	"I'm Good (Blue)"†	David Guetta and Bebe Rexha		"Can't Tame Her"	Zara Larsson	
May 20	"I'm Good (Blue)"†	David Guetta and Bebe Rexha		"Miracle"	Calvin Harris and Ellie Goulding	
May 27	"I'm Good (Blue)"†	David Guetta and Bebe Rexha		"Miracle"	Calvin Harris and Ellie Goulding	
June 3	"I'm Good (Blue)"†	David Guetta and Bebe Rexha		"Baby Don't Hurt Me"	David Guetta, Anne-Marie and Coi Leray	
June 10	"I'm Good (Blue)"†	David Guetta and Bebe Rexha		"Baby Don't Hurt Me"	David Guetta, Anne-Marie and Coi Leray	
June 17	"I'm Good (Blue)"†	David Guetta and Bebe Rexha		"Baby Don't Hurt Me"	David Guetta, Anne-Marie and Coi Leray	
June 24	"I'm Good (Blue)"†	David Guetta and Bebe Rexha		"Praising You"	Rita Ora and Fatboy Slim	
July 1	"I'm Good (Blue)"†	David Guetta and Bebe Rexha		"Praising You"	Rita Ora and Fatboy Slim	
July 8	"I'm Good (Blue)"†	David Guetta and Bebe Rexha		"Praising You"	Rita Ora and Fatboy Slim	
July 15	"I'm Good (Blue)"†	David Guetta and Bebe Rexha		"Praising You"	Rita Ora and Fatboy Slim	
July 22	"I'm Good (Blue)"†	David Guetta and Bebe Rexha		"Praising You"	Rita Ora and Fatboy Slim	
July 29	"I'm Good (Blue)"†	David Guetta and Bebe Rexha		"Praising You"	Rita Ora and Fatboy Slim	
August 5	"I'm Good (Blue)"†	David Guetta and Bebe Rexha		"Padam Padam"	Kylie Minogue	
August 12	"I'm Good (Blue)"†	David Guetta and Bebe Rexha		"Padam Padam"	Kylie Minogue	
August 19	"I'm Good (Blue)"†	David Guetta and Bebe Rexha		"If Only I"	Loud Luxury, Two Friends and Bebe Rexha	
August 26	"I'm Good (Blue)"†	David Guetta and Bebe Rexha		"Strangely Sentimental"	Anabel Englund	
September 2	"I'm Good (Blue)"†	David Guetta and Bebe Rexha		"If Only I"	Loud Luxury, Two Friends and Bebe Rexha	
September 9	"I'm Good (Blue)"†	David Guetta and Bebe Rexha		"If Only I"	Loud Luxury, Two Friends and Bebe Rexha	
September 16	"I'm Good (Blue)"†	David Guetta and Bebe Rexha		"Makeba"	Jain	
September 23	"I'm Good (Blue)"†	David Guetta and Bebe Rexha		"(It Goes Like) Nanana"	Peggy Gou	
September 30	"I'm Good (Blue)"†	David Guetta and Bebe Rexha		"(It Goes Like) Nanana"	Peggy Gou	
October 7	"I'm Good (Blue)"†	David Guetta and Bebe Rexha		"Other Side"	Illenium & Said the Sky featuring Vera Blue	
October 14	"I'm Good (Blue)"†	David Guetta and Bebe Rexha		"Running Blind"	Aluna, Tchami and Kareen Lomax	
October 21	"Strangers"	Kenya Grace		"Phone"	Meduza featuring Sam Tompkins and Em Beihold	
October 28	"Strangers"	Kenya Grace		"Phone"	Meduza featuring Sam Tompkins and Em Beihold	
November 4	"Strangers"	Kenya Grace		"Strangers"	Kenya Grace	
November 11	"Strangers"	Kenya Grace		"Strangers"	Kenya Grace	
November 18	"Strangers"	Kenya Grace		"Strangers"	Kenya Grace	
November 25	"Houdini"	Dua Lipa		"Strangers"	Kenya Grace	
December 2	"Houdini"	Dua Lipa		"Strangers"	Kenya Grace	
December 9	"Houdini"	Dua Lipa		"Strangers"	Kenya Grace	
December 16	"Houdini"	Dua Lipa		"A Lesson in Chemistry"	Anabel Englund	
December 23	"Houdini"	Dua Lipa		"Strangers"	Kenya Grace	
December 30	"Houdini"	Dua Lipa		"Saving Up"	Dom Dolla	

== See also ==
- 2023 in American music
- List of Billboard Hot 100 number ones of 2023
