= Strangers (Kenya Grace song) =

Single by Kenya Grace

from the EP The After Taste
- Released: 1 September 2023
- Recorded: 2022–2023
- Genre: Drum and bass
- Length: 2:52
- Label: Major; Warner
- Songwriter: Kenya Grace
- Producer: Kenya Grace

Kenya Grace singles chronology
"Meteor" (2023)	"Strangers" (2023)	"Only in My Mind" (2023)

Lyric video
- "Strangers" on YouTube

"Strangers" is a song by British-South African musician Kenya Grace. It was officially released as her major-label debut single on September 1, 2023 through Major Recordings, a dance label owned by Warner Records. It is the follow-up release to her prior viral single, "Meteor" (also in 2023). "Strangers" was Grace's breakthrough single, peaking at number one in Austria, Bulgaria, Croatia, Latvia, Lithuania, the United Kingdom and Ukraine, as well as topping both the Australian and American dance music charts. The track peaked at number two in Luxembourg, New Zealand, Russia, Slovakia and Switzerland, and was a top-five or top-ten hit in the Czech Republic, Denmark, Finland, France, Germany, Hungary, Iceland, India, Ireland, Japan, the Netherlands, Norway, Poland, Singapore, Sweden and the United Arab Emirates.

The work was nominated for the PRS for Music Most Performed Work Ivor Novello Award on Thursday May 23, 2024.

== Background ==
Grace initially shared a snippet of the song on her Instagram Reels on July 14, 2023. Social media agency 10x Content orchestrated a viral marketing campaign to propel the song. After she teased the song again on July 27, 2023, this time via TikTok, the song would go viral. The TikTok video has accumulated over 35 million views.

A press release described the song as containing "vibey synths" and a "drum 'n' bass core", as well as a "propulsive backdrop", on top of which Grace "layers evocative vocals" with a "gentle delivery".

== Charts ==
=== Weekly charts ===
Weekly chart performance for "Strangers"
Chart (2023–2024)	Peak position
Australia (ARIA)	2
Australia Dance (ARIA)	1
Austria (Ö3 Austria Top 40)	1
Belarus Airplay (TopHit)	1
Belgium (Ultratop 50 Flanders)	3
Belgium (Ultratop 50 Wallonia)	1
Bulgaria Airplay (PROPHON)	1
Canada (Canadian Hot 100)	17
Canada CHR/Top 40 (Billboard)	15
CIS Airplay (TopHit)	1
Croatia International Airplay (Top lista)	1
Czech Republic Airplay (ČNS IFPI)	6
Czech Republic Singles Digital (ČNS IFPI)	3
Denmark (Tracklisten)	8
Estonia Airplay (TopHit)	2
Finland (Suomen virallinen lista)	7
France (SNEP)	10
Germany (GfK)	4
Global 200 (Billboard)	5
Greece International (IFPI)	2
Hungary (Single Top 40)	10
Iceland (Tónlistinn)	8
India International (IMI)	4
Ireland (IRMA)	3
Israel (Mako Hitlist)	70
Italy (FIMI)	62
Japan Hot Overseas (Billboard Japan)	10
Kazakhstan Airplay (TopHit)	4
Latvia Airplay (LaIPA)	3
Latvia Streaming (LaIPA)	1
Lithuania (AGATA)	1
Lithuania Airplay (TopHit)	1
Luxembourg (Billboard)	2
Malaysia International (RIM)	20
Middle East and North Africa (IFPI)	7
Moldova Airplay (TopHit)	112
Netherlands (Dutch Top 40)	3
Netherlands (Single Top 100)	3
New Zealand (Recorded Music NZ)	2
Nigeria (TurnTable Top 100)	61
North Africa (IFPI)	15
Norway (VG-lista)	5
Poland (Polish Airplay Top 100)	3
Poland (Polish Streaming Top 100)	12
Portugal (AFP)	12
Romania Airplay (Media Forest)	4
Russia Airplay (TopHit)	2
Singapore (RIAS)	6
Slovakia Airplay (ČNS IFPI)	2
Slovakia Singles Digital (ČNS IFPI)	1
Sweden (Sverigetopplistan)	8
Switzerland (Schweizer Hitparade)	2
Turkey International Airplay (Radiomonitor Türkiye)	8
Ukraine Airplay (TopHit)	1
United Arab Emirates (IFPI)	5
UK Singles (Official Charts)	1
US Billboard Hot 100	42
US Adult Pop Airplay (Billboard)	33
US Hot Dance/Electronic Songs (Billboard)	1
US Pop Airplay (Billboard)	9

=== Monthly charts ===
Monthly chart performance for "Strangers"
Chart (2023–2024)	Peak position
Belarus Airplay (TopHit)	1
CIS Airplay (TopHit)	1
Czech Republic (Rádio – Top 100)	20
Czech Republic (Singles Digitál – Top 100)	5
Estonia Airplay (TopHit)	3
Kazakhstan Airplay (TopHit)	7
Latvia Airplay (TopHit)	10
Lithuania Airplay (TopHit)	1
Paraguay (SGP)	79
Romania Airplay (TopHit)	18
Russia Airplay (TopHit)	5
Slovakia (Rádio – Top 100)	2
Slovakia (Singles Digitál – Top 100)	1
Ukraine Airplay (TopHit)	1

=== Year-end charts ===
2023 year-end chart performance for "Strangers"
Chart (2023)	Position
Australia (ARIA)	93
Austria (Ö3 Austria Top 40)	29
Belarus Airplay (TopHit)	189
Belgium (Ultratop 50 Flanders)	61
Belgium (Ultratop 50 Wallonia)	75
CIS Airplay (TopHit)	76
Estonia Airplay (TopHit)	50
Germany (GfK)	43
Hungary (Single Top 40)	32
Lithuania Airplay (TopHit)	16
Netherlands (Dutch Top 40)	28
Netherlands (Single Top 100)	44
Poland (Polish Airplay Top 100)	73
Russia Airplay (TopHit)	156
Switzerland (Schweizer Hitparade)	37
UK Singles (OCC)	52
US Hot Dance/Electronic Songs (Billboard)	23

2024 year-end chart performance for "Strangers"
Chart (2024)	Position
Australia (ARIA)	55
Australia Dance (ARIA)	4
Austria (Ö3 Austria Top 40)	56
Belarus Airplay (TopHit)	6
Belgium (Ultratop 50 Flanders)	26
Belgium (Ultratop 50 Wallonia)	28
Canada (Canadian Hot 100)	59
CIS Airplay (TopHit)	12
Estonia Airplay (TopHit)	7
France (SNEP)	146
Germany (GfK)	41
Global 200 (Billboard)	93
Iceland (Tónlistinn)	63
Kazakhstan Airplay (TopHit)	65
Switzerland (Schweizer Hitparade)	63
Russia Airplay (TopHit)	32
UK Singles (OCC)	52
US Hot Dance/Electronic Songs (Billboard)	4
US Mainstream Top 40 (Billboard)	29

2025 year-end chart performance for "Strangers"
Chart (2025)	Position
Belarus Airplay (TopHit)	61
CIS Airplay (TopHit)	149
Estonia Airplay (TopHit)	133

== Certifications ==
Certifications for "Strangers"
Region	Certification	Certified units/sales
Australia (ARIA)	2× Platinum	140,000^{‡}
Austria (IFPI Austria)	Platinum	30,000^{‡}
Canada (Music Canada)	3× Platinum	240,000^{‡}
Denmark (IFPI Danmark)	Platinum	90,000^{‡}
France (SNEP)	Diamond	333,333^{‡}
Germany (BVMI)	Platinum	600,000^{‡}
Italy (FIMI)	Gold	50,000^{‡}
New Zealand (RMNZ)	3× Platinum	90,000^{‡}
Poland (ZPAV)	3× Platinum	150,000^{‡}
Portugal (AFP)	Platinum	10,000^{‡}
Spain (Promusicae)	Gold	30,000^{‡}
Switzerland (IFPI Switzerland)	2× Platinum	60,000^{‡}
United Kingdom (BPI)	2× Platinum	1,200,000^{‡}
United States (RIAA)	Gold	500,000^{‡}
^{‡} Sales+streaming figures based on certification alone.

== See also ==
- List of Billboard number-one dance songs of 2023
- List of Billboard number-one dance songs of 2024
