= Tasker (producer) =

Australian music producer

- Born: Caleb Tasker; 3 June 1996 (age 29)
- Genres: Hip hop, R&B, Pop Music, Electronic
- Occupation: Music producer
- Instruments: Guitar, keyboards, bass guitar
- Years active: 2015–present
- Labels: Native Tongue

Caleb Tasker, (Tasker) is an Australian music producer, DJ, songwriter and vocalist based in Sydney. He has written and produced for a number of Australian and International artists including 3% (group), Rum Jungle, Jae Park, Chillinit, Don West, Tia Gostelow, George Alice. He also previously played in the band "Pleasure Coma" and "Rest For The Wicked". He is now currently the Lead Guitarist for Gerringong Based Indie Surf Rock Band "The Terrys".

== Discography ==
=== Production/ Co-Writes/ Vocals/ Remixes ===
Year	Song	Artist	Album	Label	Production	Co-Writes	Vocals	Executive
2019	Selling Me Out	Tuka	TBA	EMI Music Australia	check	check		
2019	Running	NIMMO	The Power	Independent	check			
2019	Eyes To The Sky	Okenyo	Single	Elefant Tracks	check	check		
2019	Talk To M333	Oh Boy	Single	Independent	check			
2019	Waiting, Naked, Jonny	Pleasure Coma	The Naked EP	Independent	check	check	check	check
2018	About You	G Flip (Tasker Remix)	Single		check			
2018	Down For You	Maribelle	Single		check			
2018	Something More	Kinder	Single	Independent	check			
2018	Phone Me	Tia Gostelow	Thick Skin			check		
2018	Numb	Lukr, Fossa Beats	Single	Independent	check	check		
2018	Slide	Hi Life Featuring Harvey (Tasker Remix)	Single	Future Classic	check			
2017	Supreme	Panta Ray (Tasker Remix)	Single	Independent	check			
2015	Get Ready	Alison Wonderland (Tasker & Leaderboy Remix)	Run (Alison Wonderland album)	EMI Music Australia	check			

=== Studio albums ===
List of studio albums, with release date, label, and selected chart positions shown
Title	Details	Peak chart positions
Title	Details	AUS
Antihero	Released: 11 February 2022; Label: Ben Hayden, Island Records Australia (4518106); Format: CD, digital download, streaming	1
