= List of number-one albums of 2022 (Australia) =

ARIA Charts number-one albums of 2022 < 2021 2023 >

Other Australian number-one charts of 2022
- singles
- urban singles
- dance singles
- club tracks
- digital tracks
- streaming tracks

Top Australian singles and albums of 2022
- Triple J Hottest 100
- top 25 singles
- top 25 albums

The ARIA Albums Chart ranks the best-performing albums and extended plays (EPs) in Australia. Its data, published by the Australian Recording Industry Association, is based collectively on the weekly physical and digital sales and streams of albums and EPs. In 2022, 34 albums claimed the top spot, with the first, 30 by Adele, continuing its run from the end of 2021. Meat Loaf returned to number one with his best-selling 1977 debut album Bat Out of Hell following his death in January 2022. Future Nostalgia also returned to the top for a third week in a third consecutive year. Nine artists, the Wiggles, Charli XCX, Machine Gun Kelly, Wet Leg, Future, Daniel Johns, Spacey Jane, Yungblud and Meg Mac, achieved their first number-one album.

== Chart history ==
Key
†	Indicates best-performing album of 2022

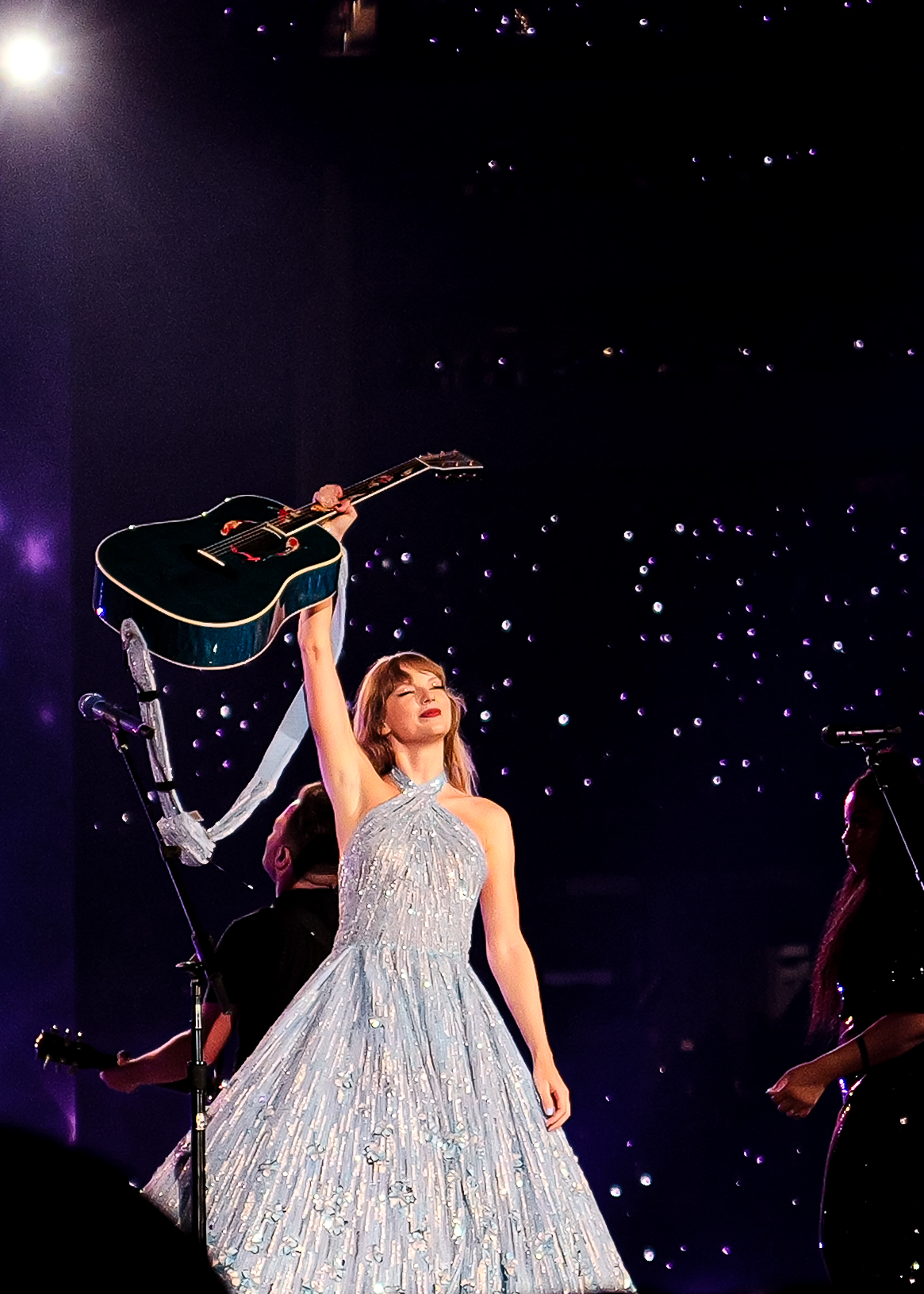
Midnights by Taylor Swift was the best selling album of the year.

Date	Album	Artist(s)	Ref.
3 January	30	Adele	
10 January	30	Adele	
17 January	Dawn FM	The Weeknd	
24 January	Dawn FM	The Weeknd	
31 January	Bat Out of Hell	Meat Loaf	
7 February	Dawn FM	The Weeknd	
14 February	Requiem	Korn	
21 February	Antihero	Huskii	
28 February	Resist	Midnight Oil	
7 March	Angel in Realtime	Gang of Youths	
14 March	Encanto (Original Motion Picture Soundtrack)	Various artists	
21 March	ReWiggled	The Wiggles	
28 March	Crash	Charli XCX	
4 April	Mainstream Sellout	Machine Gun Kelly	
11 April	Unlimited Love	Red Hot Chili Peppers	
18 April	Wet Leg	Wet Leg	
25 April	Future Nostalgia	Dua Lipa	
2 May	Obsidian	Northlane	
9 May	I Never Liked You	Future	
16 May	FutureNever	Daniel Johns	
23 May	Mr. Morale & the Big Steppers	Kendrick Lamar	
30 May	Harry's House	Harry Styles	
6 June	Harry's House	Harry Styles	
13 June	Harry's House	Harry Styles	
20 June	Proof	BTS	
27 June	Soul Deep 30	Jimmy Barnes	
4 July	Here Comes Everybody	Spacey Jane	
11 July	Harry's House	Harry Styles	
18 July	Harry's House	Harry Styles	
25 July	Harry's House	Harry Styles	
1 August	Harry's House	Harry Styles	
8 August	Renaissance	Beyoncé	
15 August	Renaissance	Beyoncé	
22 August	Harry's House	Harry Styles	
29 August	Finally Enough Love	Madonna	
5 September	Will of the People	Muse	
12 September	Yungblud	Yungblud	
19 September	Darker Still	Parkway Drive	
26 September	Matter of Time	Meg Mac	
3 October	5SOS5	5 Seconds of Summer	
10 October	The End, So Far	Slipknot	
17 October	FutureNever	Daniel Johns	
24 October	Being Funny in a Foreign Language	The 1975	
31 October	Midnights †	Taylor Swift	
7 November	Midnights †	Taylor Swift	
14 November	Midnights †	Taylor Swift	
21 November	Midnights †	Taylor Swift	
28 November	Midnights †	Taylor Swift	
5 December	Blue Christmas	Jimmy Barnes	
12 December	Paul Kelly's Christmas Train	Paul Kelly	
19 December	Midnights †	Taylor Swift	
26 December	Midnights †	Taylor Swift	

== Number-one artists ==
List of number-one artists, with total weeks spent at number one shown
Position	Artist	Weeks at No. 1
1	Harry Styles	8
2	Taylor Swift	7
3	The Weeknd	3
4	Adele	2
4	Beyoncé	2
4	Daniel Johns	2
4	Jimmy Barnes	2
5	Meat Loaf	1
5	Korn	1
5	Huskii	1
5	Midnight Oil	1
5	Gang of Youths	1
5	The Wiggles	1
5	Charli XCX	1
5	Machine Gun Kelly	1
5	Red Hot Chili Peppers	1
5	Wet Leg	1
5	Dua Lipa	1
5	Northlane	1
5	Future	1
5	Kendrick Lamar	1
5	BTS	1
5	Spacey Jane	1
5	Madonna	1
5	Muse	1
5	Yungblud	1
5	Parkway Drive	1
5	Meg Mac	1
5	5 Seconds of Summer	1
5	Slipknot	1
5	The 1975	1
5	Paul Kelly	1

== See also ==
- 2022 in music
- List of number-one singles of 2021 (Australia)
