= List of Top 25 singles for 2022 in Australia =

Top 25 singles of 2022 < 2021 2023 >

Other Australian top charts for 2022
- top 25 albums
- Triple J Hottest 100

Australian number-one charts of 2022
- albums
- singles
- urban singles
- dance singles
- club tracks
- digital tracks
- streaming tracks

The following lists the top 25 singles of 2022 in Australia from the Australian Recording Industry Association (ARIA) end-of-year singles chart.

"As It Was" by Harry Styles was the top-selling single of 2022 in Australia, spending 8 non-consecutive weeks at No. 1 and 39 weeks in the Top 10 and being certified five times platinum. For the second consecutive year, The Kid Laroi had the highest-selling Australian song of the year with "Stay" featuring Justin Bieber, which was certified twelve times platinum and returned to the top of the chart for 3 consecutive weeks after having spent 14 consecutive weeks atop the chart the previous year.

| # | Title | Artist | Highest pos. reached |
|---|---|---|---|
| 1 | "As It Was" | Harry Styles | 1 |
| 2 | "Heat Waves" | Glass Animals | 1 |
| 3 | "Stay" | The Kid Laroi and Justin Bieber | 1 |
| 4 | "Cold Heart (Pnau remix)" | Elton John and Dua Lipa | 1 |
| 5 | "Bad Habits" | Ed Sheeran | 2 |
| 6 | "Shivers" | Ed Sheeran | 5 |
| 7 | "Where Are You Now" | Lost Frequencies & Calum Scott | 5 |
| 8 | "First Class" | Jack Harlow | 1 |
| 9 | "I Ain't Worried" | OneRepublic | 2 |
| 10 | "About Damn Time" | Lizzo | 3 |
| 11 | "Running Up That Hill (A Deal with God)" | Kate Bush | 1 |
| 12 | "abcdefu" | Gayle | 2 |
| 13 | "Ghost" | Justin Bieber | 11 |
| 14 | "Levitating" | Dua Lipa | 12 |
| 15 | "Save Your Tears" | The Weeknd | 14 |
| 16 | "Industry Baby" | Lil Nas X & Jack Harlow | 5 |
| 17 | "Easy On Me" | Adele | 7 |
| 18 | "Mr. Brightside" | The Killers | 23 |
| 19 | "Unholy" | Sam Smith & Kim Petras | 1 |
| 20 | "Big Energy" | Latto | 6 |
| 21 | "Good 4 U" | Olivia Rodrigo | 9 |
| 22 | "Enemy" | Imagine Dragons and JID | 15 |
| 23 | "Thats What I Want" | Lil Nas X | 7 |
| 24 | "Bad Habit" | Steve Lacy | 3 |
| 25 | "I'm Good (Blue)" | David Guetta and Bebe Rexha | 1 |

== See also ==
- List of number-one singles of 2022 (Australia)
- List of top 10 singles for 2022 in Australia
- List of Top 25 albums for 2022 in Australia
- 2022 in music
- ARIA Charts
- List of Australian chart achievements and milestones
