= The Terrys =

Australian indie folk band

- Origin: Gerringong, New South Wales, Australia
- Genres: Indie rock; folk rock; indie folk
- Years active: 2020–present
- Labels: Domestic La La, Impressed Recordings
- Members: Jacob Finch; Caleb Tasker; Ben Salvatori; Cameron Cooper; Trent Cooper
- Past members: Lukas Anderson
- Website: www.theterrysband.com

The Terrys are an Australian indie rock band from Gerringong that formed in early 2020. The group consists of lead vocalist Jacob Finch, lead guitarist Caleb Tasker, rhythm guitarist Ben Salvatori, drummer Cameron Cooper and bassist Trent Cooper.

The band released their debut single "Video Games" in June 2020, later releasing their debut EP titled The TerrySonic Mixtape in September 2021. Their debut studio album, True Colour, was released in October 2022, and peaked at number 17 on the ARIA Charts in March 2023. They released their second album, Skate Pop, in February 2024. Their third studio album, The Terrys, was released in July 2025.

The band is named after the original trio's landlord.

== History ==
The Terrys formed in Gerringong, New South Wales in 2020, with Jacob Finch, Lukas Anderson, and Ben Salvatori jamming together in their shared rental house. Cameron Cooper and Trent Cooper later joined, and the band officially formed, taking the name of their landlord "Terry".

"Our Paradise" appeared at number 76 on the 2021 Triple J Hottest 100.

In 2022 the Terrys covered Ben Lee's 2005 song "Catch My Disease" for triple j's Like a Version. Their cover appeared as number 37 on the 2023 Triple J Like a Version Hottest 100.

"No Bad Days" appeared at number 93 on the 2023 Triple J Hottest 100.

In May 2025 the Terrys announced on their Instagram page that guitarist Lukas Anderson had left the band. He was replaced by Caleb Tasker.

== Members ==
=== Current members ===
- Jacob Finch – vocals
- Caleb Tasker – lead guitar
- Ben Salvatori – rhythm guitar
- Cameron Cooper – drums
- Trent Cooper – bass guitar

=== Previous members ===
- Lukas Anderson (left May 2025)

== Discography ==
=== Studio albums ===
List of studio albums, with selected chart positions shown
Title	Details	Peak chart positions
Title	Details	AUS
True Colour	Released: 7 October 2022; Label: The Terrys, Domestic La La (DLL027); Formats: CD, LP, digital download	17
Skate Pop	Released: 23 February 2024; Label: Impressed (IMP019); Formats: LP, digital download	71
The Terrys	Released: 11 July 2025; Label: The Terrys, Westaway Impressed (IMP157); Formats: LP, digital download	54

=== Extended plays ===
List of EPs, with release date and label shown
Title	Details
The TerrySonic Mixtape	Released: 3 September 2021; Label: The Terrys, Domestic La La Records (DLL025); Formats: digital download, LP, streaming
