= List of number-one albums of 2022 (Canada) =

These are the Canadian number-one albums of 2022. The chart is compiled by Luminate and published in Billboard magazine as Top Canadian Albums.

== Number-one albums ==
Key
†	Indicates best-performing album of 2022

Issue date	Album	Artist(s)	Ref.
January 1	30 †	Adele	
January 8	Christmas	Michael Bublé	
January 15	30 †	Adele	
January 22	Dawn FM	The Weeknd	
January 29	Dawn FM	The Weeknd	
February 5	Encanto	Soundtrack	
February 12	Encanto	Soundtrack	
February 19	Encanto	Soundtrack	
February 26	Encanto	Soundtrack	
March 5	Encanto	Soundtrack	
March 12	Encanto	Soundtrack	
March 19	Encanto	Soundtrack	
March 26	Encanto	Soundtrack	
April 2	Encanto	Soundtrack	
April 9	Mainstream Sellout	Machine Gun Kelly	
April 16	Unlimited Love	Red Hot Chili Peppers	
April 23	Sour	Olivia Rodrigo	
April 30	Sour	Olivia Rodrigo	
May 7	It's Almost Dry	Pusha T	
May 14	I Never Liked You	Future	
May 21	Come Home the Kids Miss You	Jack Harlow	
May 28	Mr. Morale & the Big Steppers	Kendrick Lamar	
June 4	Harry's House	Harry Styles	
June 11	Harry's House	Harry Styles	
June 18	Twelve Carat Toothache	Post Malone	
June 25	Proof	BTS	
July 2	Honestly, Nevermind	Drake	
July 9	Honestly, Nevermind	Drake	
July 16	Honestly, Nevermind	Drake	
July 23	Harry's House	Harry Styles	
July 30	Harry's House	Harry Styles	
August 6	Harry's House	Harry Styles	
August 13	Renaissance	Beyoncé	
August 20	Renaissance	Beyoncé	
August 27	Harry's House	Harry Styles	
September 3	Harry's House	Harry Styles	
September 10	God Did	DJ Khaled	
September 17	Harry's House	Harry Styles	
September 24	Patient Number 9	Ozzy Osbourne	
October 1	Born Pink	Blackpink	
October 8	The Highlights	The Weeknd	
October 15	The Highlights	The Weeknd	
October 22	The Highlights	The Weeknd	
October 29	It's Only Me	Lil Baby	
November 5	Midnights	Taylor Swift	
November 12	Midnights	Taylor Swift	
November 19	Her Loss	Drake and 21 Savage	
November 26	Midnights	Taylor Swift	
December 3	Midnights	Taylor Swift	
December 10	Midnights	Taylor Swift	
December 17	Heroes & Villains	Metro Boomin	
December 24	SOS	SZA	
December 31	SOS	SZA	

== See also ==
- List of Canadian Hot 100 number-one singles of 2022
