= Kenya Grace =

British singer, songwriter, and record producer (born 1998)

- Born: Kenya Grace Johnson; May 9, 1998 (age 27); South Africa
- Origin: London, England
- Genres: Drum and bass
- Occupations: Singer; songwriter; record producer
- Years active: 2019–present
- Labels: Major; Warner

Kenya Grace Johnson (born May 9, 1998) is a South African-born British singer, songwriter, and record producer. She is best known for her 2023 single "Strangers", which reached number one on the UK Singles Chart.

== Life and career ==
=== Early life ===
Kenya Grace Johnson was born in South Africa to a South African mother and a British father, but she grew up in a “very quiet and chill” town (Chandler’s Ford) near Southampton. She attended Thornden School and used to play hockey for Hampshire. She started writing when she was 10 years old, and started singing in primary school after being gifted a second-hand Yamaha keyboard. She first developed an interest in musical theatre, before growing up and developing an interest in dance music, dubstep first. She attended Academy of Contemporary Music in Guildford, first reading history and English literature, but switching to music after deciding to become a musician, and graduated in September 2019 with a degree in songwriting and creative artistry. She has credited the university with curing her stage fright.

In 2019, she released "Obsessed", her first release, and then "Tell Me Why", which she wrote while drunk and having just fought with someone. Later that year, she and Willow Kayne made the Top 21 in ISawItFirst, a competition for a nationwide search in collaboration with Capital Xtra intended to find new women musicians. After becoming a finalist in the competition she won a music video shoot for "Tell Me Why" - her first music video. She then released "Talk", which she wrote in her parents' bedroom during the COVID-19 lockdown in the United Kingdom after getting out of a toxic relationship; she later moved to North London, her move having been delayed by the pandemic. In February and May 2023, she released "Afterparty Lover" and "Meteor".

=== 2023–present: Strangers and The After Taste ===
In late July 2023, she started to promote "Strangers", a drum and bass song she had written and produced in her bedroom, with the intention of making a euphoric track, on her TikTok account. This clip was viewed over 11,000,000 times, with a subsequent video being viewed over 38,000,000 times; when released on 1 September 2023 on FFRR Records, the song saw further success on the platform, and by 26 September 2023 had seen use in over 570,000 videos.

She promoted the song with a further eight videos promoting the track, all of which were viewed more than 1,000,000 times, and which typically depicted her singing the track on her electronic drum pads; the song also went viral on Instagram Reels. A week after release, the song entered the UK Singles Chart, eventually peaking at No. 1; upon entry, the Official Charts Company attributed her success to the commercial renaissance of drum and bass and the dominance of female artists (in its first week on the charts, the top three were Doja Cat, Taylor Swift and Olivia Rodrigo).

On 15 September 2023, she released a "slower and sadder" remix of Strangers, and three weeks after that, she released a further single, "Only in My Mind", having teased the track on social media.

On 13 October 2023, Strangers peaked at No. 1 on the UK Singles Chart, making her the first British female artist to top the charts with a debut single since X-Factor star Ella Henderson's 'Ghost' in 2014. It also made her the second British female artist ever to reach No. 1 with a track performed, written and produced entirely solo after Kate Bush's "Running Up That Hill".

In December 2023, a day after the release of her single, "Paris", she revealed on Instagram that she was working on her debut EP, The After Taste, which released on 22 March 2024.

She said “I've tried to not look at numbers anymore and get caught up in that world. I feel like that's a killer of joy, in a way. It's actually really toxic. You constantly see a numerical value judging your art, which is just not good. I try to preserve my creativity.”

== Artistry ==
Kenya has stated that her biggest inspiration is Banks; she also takes inspiration from Flume and Nao, and cites Norah Jones and Katie Melua. She first writes her tracks instrumental first. Upon entrance of the UK Singles Chart, the Official Charts Company described her voice as a combination of PinkPantheress, Charli XCX, and Piri.

She laughed, "Me and my brother would put drum'n'bass on, like really heavy jump-up. And then my mum and my dad would try and put Fleetwood Mac on".

== Discography ==
=== Extended plays ===
Title	Details	Peak chart positions
Title	Details	US Dance
The After Taste	Released: 22 March 2024; Label: Warner; Formats: Digital download, streaming, CD, LP	7

=== Singles ===
List of singles, with selected chart positions, certifications, and album name
Title	Year	Peak chart positions										Certifications	Album
Title	Year	UK	AUS	AUT	GER	NLD	NZ	SWE	SWI	US	WW	Certifications	Album
"Obsessed"	2019	—	—	—	—	—	—	—	—	—	—		Non-album singles
"Tell Me Why"	2019	—	—	—	—	—	—	—	—	—	—		Non-album singles
"Talk"	2020	—	—	—	—	—	—	—	—	—	—		Non-album singles
"Venus" (with Homebodi)	2022	—	—	—	—	—	—	—	—	—	—		Non-album singles
"Someone Else" (with 3Strange)	2022	—	—	—	—	—	—	—	—	—	—		Non-album singles
"Oranges"	2022	—	—	—	—	—	—	—	—	—	—		Non-album singles
"Afterparty Lover"	2023	—	—	—	—	—	—	—	—	—	—		Non-album singles
"Meteor" (with Solomon)	2023	—	—	—	—	—	—	—	—	—	—		Non-album singles
"Strangers"	2023	1	2	1	4	3	2	8	2	42	5	BPI: 2× Platinum; ARIA: 2× Platinum; BVMI: Platinum; IFPI AUT: Platinum; IFPI SWI: 2× Platinum; RIAA: Gold; RMNZ: 3× Platinum	The After Taste
"Only in My Mind"	2023	—	—	—	—	—	— (Note: "Only in My Mind" did not enter the NZ Top 40 Singles Chart, but peaked at number 15 on the NZ Hot Singles Chart.)	—	—	—	—		The After Taste
"Paris"	2023	—	—	—	—	—	— (Note: "Paris" did not enter the NZ Top 40 Singles Chart, but peaked at number 27 on the NZ Hot Singles Chart.)	—	—	—	—		Non-album single
"It's Not Fair"	2024	—	—	—	—	—	—	—	—	—	—		The After Taste
"Mr. Cool"	2025	—	—	—	—	—	—	—	—	—	—		TBA
"Naked"	2026	—	—	—	—	—	—	—	—	—	—		TBA
"The One You Loved"	2026	—	—	—	—	—	—	—	—	—	—		TBA
"—" denotes a recording that did not chart or was not released in that territory.

== Live performances ==
Kenya has played live in:

- New York City
- Chicago
- BBC Music Introducing
- Melkweg (Amsterdam) - 2023
- Amsterdam Dance Event (Amsterdam) - 2023
- iHeart Radio Jingle Ball - 2023
- El Rey Theatre (Los Angeles) - 2023
- Spotify Wrapped - 2023
- Roundhouse (London) for the Rolling Stone UK Awards - 2023
- Village Underground (London) - 2023
- BBC Radio 1's Big Weekend - 2024
- Gorilla (Manchester) - 2024

== Festivals ==
Kenya played her first festival at Coachella in 2024, which she said "was literally the best day of my life". She continued, "I ran off the stage before I started sobbing". She went on to say "it was the best experience of my entire life". In a separate interview she said "I've never seen a crowd that big before".

Later in 2024 she played at Glastonbury Festival where she "delivered an amazing set" according to the BBC, singing her own songs such as Strangers, Stay, Only In My Mind and Paris; as well as covering other artists' songs such as Toxic by Britney Spears and Whatcha Say by Jason Derulo.

Building on her success at festivals, between July and October 2024 Kenya is booked to play at:

- Mad Cool Festival 2024 - Iberdrola Music - Madrid, Spain
- Exit Festival 2024 - Petrovaradin Fortress - Novi Sad, Serbia
- NOS Alive 2024 - Passeio Marítimo de Algés - Algés, Portugal
- Melt Festival 2024 - Ferropolis - Gräfenhainichen, Germany
- Electric Castle Festival 2024 - Electric Castle - Cluj-Napoca, Romania
- Way Out West Festival 2024 - Slottsskogen - Gothenburg, Sweden
- Flow Festival 2024 - Suvilahti - Helsinki, Finland
- Reading Festival 2024 - Richfield Avenue - Reading, United Kingdom
- Leeds Festival 2024 - Leeds Festival - Leeds, United Kingdom
- Zürich Openair 2024 - Zürich, Switzerland
- Sundown Festival 2024 - Norfolk Showground - Costessey, United Kingdom
- Lollapalooza 2024 - Olympiastadion & Olympiapark - Berlin, Germany
- Breakaway Music Festival 2024 - zMAX Dragway - Concord, North Carolina, United States
- Breakaway Music Festival 2024 - Fair Park Fairgrounds - Nashville, Tennessee, United States

== Awards and nominations ==
Award	Year	Nominated work	Award	Result	Ref.
BBC Sound of...	2023	Herself	Sound of 2024	Nominated	
Brit Awards	2024	"Strangers"	Song of the Year	Nominated	
EDM.com	2024	Herself	Class of 2024	Included	
Electronic Dance Music Awards	2024	"Strangers"	Dance Radio Song Of The Year	Nominated	
Electronic Dance Music Awards	2024	"Strangers"	DnB (Drum and Bass) Song of the Year	Nominated	
Electronic Dance Music Awards	2024	Herself	Breakthrough Artist of the Year	Nominated	
Global Awards	2024	"Strangers"	Best Song	Nominated	
Global Awards	2024	Herself	Rising Star	Nominated	
iHeartRadio Music Awards	2024	"Strangers"	Dance Song of the Year	Won	
American Society of Composers, Authors and Publishers	2024	Herself	Global Impact Award	Won	
Ivor Novello	2024	"Strangers"	Most Performed Work	Nominated	
