= Nicky Youre =

American singer-songwriter (born 1999)

- Born: Nicholas Scott Ure; June 4, 1999 (age 27); Anaheim, California, U.S.
- Education: University of California, San Diego (BA); Golden West College (AA)
- Occupation: Singer-songwriter
- Years active: 2017–present
- Musical career
- Genre: Pop
- Instruments: Vocals
- Labels: Thirty Knots; Columbia
- Website: nickyyoure.com

Nicholas Scott Ure (born June 4, 1999), known professionally as Nicky Youre, is an American singer-songwriter. He is best known for his 2021 single "Sunroof".

== Early life and education ==
Ure played water polo at Aliso Niguel High School, where he participated in the 2016 CIF Southern Section Division 3 Championship Game. After graduating from high school, he continued his water polo career at Golden West College. After earning his associate degree in business and public administration from Golden West, he went on to earn a Bachelor of Arts in international business from the University of California, San Diego.

== Career ==
Ure started making music in 2017 and released his debut single "Sex and Lemonade" on June 4, 2020. "Sex and Lemonade" featured the producer Laiki, an artist who had previously issued the EP Together/Separate, featuring a number of collaborations with Ure.

His second single, "Sunroof", released in December 2021, was described by Sheesh Media as "an immediate ear-worm pop track". This track featured the Los Angeles-based musician and producer Dazy (an artist formerly known as Snocker) and reached the Top 30 in Australia and the top five of the Billboard Hot 100.

In March 2022, the 22-year-old singer released "Never Go Wrong", a single with fellow Californian David Hugo.

Later in November 2022, Ure released "Eyes on You".

In February 2023, he released a new song called "Shut Me Up".

== Discography ==
=== Studio albums ===
List of Studio albums, with selected details
Title	Details
What's the Big Deal?	Released: October 24, 2025; Format: Digital download, streaming; Label: Nicky Youre Music

=== Extended plays ===
List of EPs, with selected details
Title	Details
Good Times Go	Released: June 9, 2023; Format: Digital download; Label: Thirty Knots

=== Singles ===
List of singles, with year released, selected chart positions, certifications, and album name shown
Title	Year	Peak chart positions									Certifications	Album
Title	Year	US	AUS	CAN	GER	IRE	NZ	SWI	UK	WW	Certifications	Album
"Sex and Lemonade" (featuring Laiki)	2020	—	—	—	—	—	—	—	—	—		Good Times Go
"Sunroof" (with hey daisy)	2021	4	8	1	34	27	19	52	29	26	RIAA: 3× Platinum; ARIA: 4× Platinum; BPI: Platinum; BVMI: Gold; IFPI SWI: Platinum; MC: 3× Platinum; RMNZ: 4× Platinum	Good Times Go
"Never Go Wrong" (with David Hugo)	2022	—	—	—	—	—	—	—	—	—		Good Times Go
"Eyes on You"	2022	—	—	—	—	—	— (Note: "Eyes on You" did not enter the NZ Top 40 Singles Chart, but peaked at number two on the NZ Hot Singles Chart.)	—	—	—		Good Times Go
"Shut Me Up"	2023	—	—	—	—	—	—	—	—	—		Good Times Go
"Found"	2023	—	—	—	—	—	—	—	—	—		The Magician's Elephant
"Good Times Go"	2023	—	—	—	—	—	—	—	—	—		Good Times Go
"S.A.D."	2024	—	—	—	—	—	—	—	—	—		What's the Big Deal?
"Part Time Lover"	2024	—	—	—	—	—	—	—	—	—		What's the Big Deal?
"Mile Away"	2024	—	—	—	—	—	—	—	—	—		What's the Big Deal?
"Tease Me"	2024	—	—	—	—	—	—	—	—	—		What's the Big Deal?
"U and I (Intertwine)"	2024	—	—	—	—	—	—	—	—	—		What's the Big Deal?
"Light Me Up"	2025	—	—	—	—	—	—	—	—	—		What's the Big Deal?
"—" denotes a recording that did not chart or was not released in that territory.

== Awards and nominations ==
Award	Year	Recipient(s) and nominee(s)	Category	Result	Ref.
MTV Video Music Awards	2022	Sunroof (with Dazy)	Song of Summer	Nominated	
Kids' Choice Awards	2023	Himself	Favorite Breakout Artist	Nominated	
iHeartRadio Music Awards	2023	Himself	Best New Pop Artist	Nominated	
