= List of number-one dance singles of 2022 (Australia) =

ARIA Charts number-one dance singles of 2022 < 2021 2023 >

Other Australian number-one charts of 2022
- albums
- singles
- urban singles
- club tracks
- digital tracks
- streaming tracks

Top Australian singles and albums of 2022
- Triple J Hottest 100
- top 25 singles
- top 25 albums

The ARIA Dance Chart is a chart that ranks the best-performing dance singles of Australia. It is published by Australian Recording Industry Association (ARIA), an organisation who collect music data for the weekly ARIA Charts. To be eligible to appear on the chart, the recording must be a single, and be "predominantly of a dance nature, or with a featured track of a dance nature, or included in the ARIA Club Chart or a comparable overseas chart".

== Chart history ==
Date	Song	Artist(s)	Ref.
3 January	"Heat Waves"	Glass Animals	
10 January	"Heat Waves"	Glass Animals	
17 January	"Heat Waves"	Glass Animals	
24 January	"Heat Waves"	Glass Animals	
31 January	"Heat Waves"	Glass Animals	
7 February	"Heat Waves"	Glass Animals	
14 February	"Heat Waves"	Glass Animals	
21 February	"Heat Waves"	Glass Animals	
28 February	"Heat Waves"	Glass Animals	
7 March	"Heat Waves"	Glass Animals	
14 March	"Heat Waves"	Glass Animals	
21 March	"Heat Waves"	Glass Animals	
28 March	"Heat Waves"	Glass Animals	
4 April	"Heat Waves"	Glass Animals	
11 April	"Heat Waves"	Glass Animals	
18 April	"Heat Waves"	Glass Animals	
25 April	"Heat Waves"	Glass Animals	
2 May	"Heat Waves"	Glass Animals	
9 May	"Heat Waves"	Glass Animals	
16 May	"Heat Waves"	Glass Animals	
23 May	"Heat Waves"	Glass Animals	
30 May	"Heat Waves"	Glass Animals	
6 June	"Heat Waves"	Glass Animals	
13 June	"Heat Waves"	Glass Animals	
20 June	"Heat Waves"	Glass Animals	
27 June	"Heat Waves"	Glass Animals	
4 July	"Heat Waves"	Glass Animals	
11 July	"Heat Waves"	Glass Animals	
18 July	"Heat Waves"	Glass Animals	
25 July	"Heat Waves"	Glass Animals	
1 August	"Heat Waves"	Glass Animals	
8 August	"Heat Waves"	Glass Animals	
15 August	"Heat Waves"	Glass Animals	
22 August	"Heat Waves"	Glass Animals	
29 August	"Heat Waves"	Glass Animals	
5 September	"Heat Waves"	Glass Animals	
12 September	"I'm Good (Blue)"	David Guetta and Bebe Rexha	
19 September	"I'm Good (Blue)"	David Guetta and Bebe Rexha	
26 September	"I'm Good (Blue)"	David Guetta and Bebe Rexha	
3 October	"I'm Good (Blue)"	David Guetta and Bebe Rexha	
10 October	"I'm Good (Blue)"	David Guetta and Bebe Rexha	
17 October	"I'm Good (Blue)"	David Guetta and Bebe Rexha	
24 October	"I'm Good (Blue)"	David Guetta and Bebe Rexha	
31 October	"I'm Good (Blue)"	David Guetta and Bebe Rexha	
7 November	"I'm Good (Blue)"	David Guetta and Bebe Rexha	
14 November	"I'm Good (Blue)"	David Guetta and Bebe Rexha	
21 November	"I'm Good (Blue)"	David Guetta and Bebe Rexha	
28 November	"I'm Good (Blue)"	David Guetta and Bebe Rexha	
5 December	"I'm Good (Blue)"	David Guetta and Bebe Rexha	
12 December	"I'm Good (Blue)"	David Guetta and Bebe Rexha	
19 December	"I'm Good (Blue)"	David Guetta and Bebe Rexha	
26 December	"I'm Good (Blue)"	David Guetta and Bebe Rexha	

== Number-one artists ==
Position	Artist	Weeks at No. 1
1	Glass Animals	36
2	David Guetta	16
2	Bebe Rexha	16

== See also ==
- ARIA Charts
- 2022 in music
