= Sunroof (song) =

Single by Nicky Youre and hey daisy

from the EP Good Times Go
- Released: December 3, 2021
- Recorded: February 2021
- Studio: Nicky Youre's home, Aliso Viejo, California
- Genre: Bedroom pop; alternative pop; sunshine pop
- Length: 2:43
- Label: Thirty Knots; Columbia
- Songwriter: Nicholas Ure
- Producer: hey daisy

Nicky Youre singles chronology
"Sex and Lemonade" (2020)	"Sunroof" (2021)	"Never Go Wrong" (2022)

Music video
- "Sunroof" on YouTube

"Sunroof" is a song by American singer Nicky Youre and Los Angeles-based musician and producer Hey Daisy (Nick Minutaglio, who has also recorded as Snocker). It was released on December 3, 2021, through Thirty Knots and Columbia Records. By November 2022, the song had reached the Billboard Hot 100 top 10, and been streamed 397 million times on Spotify. In September 2022, the song topped the Canadian Hot 100. It was the most popular song on TikTok UK in 2022. In September 2024, the song became the 759th to reach 1 billion streams on Spotify.

== Background ==
"Sunroof" is a collaboration between Hey Daisy and Youre, and was born from a voice memo that Hey Daisy received from Youre. Elaborating on the creation of their song, Youre has said, "I wanted to make a song that captured the feeling of excitement you get when you meet someone that you can't stop thinking about. I wanted to have a product that was fun and high-energy while still being easy to listen to. When I meet someone like this, the thought of them is like an itch in my brain that I can't scratch. So I wanted the song to be catchy so it sticks in your head just like when you're stuck thinking about someone".

== Critical reception ==
Benjamin Kronenberg at Early Rising praised the song and described it as a track that sticks "in your head all day" thanks to the "bright production" by Dazy and Youre's "bubbling and poppy vocals". Miles Opton of Sheesh Media called the song an "immediate ear-worm pop track" that features "crisp production" by Dazy and "high-energy vocal melodies".

The song was also called a contender for song of the summer 2022.

== Uses in other media ==
This song was introduced on July 20, 2023 to Ubisoft's rhythm game Just Dance 2023 Edition as a Just Dance+ exclusive track.

== Track listing ==
Digital download and streaming – Remixes EP
No.	Title	Length
1.	"Sunroof"	2:43
2.	"Sunroof" (Thomas Rhett Remix)	2:43
3.	"Sunroof" (Manuel Turizo Remix)	2:43
4.	"Sunroof" (24kGoldn Remix)	2:42
5.	"Sunroof" (Loud Luxury Remix)	2:53
6.	"Sunroof" (Acoustic)	2:15
Total length:		15:59

== Charts ==
=== Weekly charts ===
Weekly chart performance
Chart (2022–2024)	Peak position
Australia (ARIA)	8
Austria (Ö3 Austria Top 40)	36
Belgium (Ultratop 50 Flanders)	7
Canada (Canadian Hot 100)	1
Canada AC (Billboard)	6
Canada CHR/Top 40 (Billboard)	1
Canada Hot AC (Billboard)	2
CIS Airplay (TopHit)	71
Croatia International Airplay (Top lista)	16
Czech Republic Airplay (ČNS IFPI)	95
Czech Republic Singles Digital (ČNS IFPI)	81
Denmark (Tracklisten)	13
Estonia Airplay (TopHit)	77
Finland Airplay (Radiosoittolista)	8
Germany (GfK)	34
Global 200 (Billboard)	26
Greece International (IFPI)	79
Hungary (Rádiós Top 40)	3
Ireland (IRMA)	27
Latvia Airplay (Radiomonitor)	1
Lithuania (AGATA)	65
Netherlands (Dutch Top 40)	36
Netherlands (Single Top 100)	56
New Zealand (Recorded Music NZ)	19
Philippines (Billboard)	23
Poland Airplay (ZPAV)	2
Portugal (AFP)	79
Singapore (RIAS)	9
Slovakia Airplay (ČNS IFPI)	5
Slovakia Singles Digital (ČNS IFPI)	82
South Africa Streaming (TOSAC)	51
Sweden (Sverigetopplistan)	95
Switzerland (Schweizer Hitparade)	52
UK Singles (Official Charts)	29
US Billboard Hot 100	4
US Adult Contemporary (Billboard)	4
US Adult Top 40 (Billboard)	1
US Hot Rock & Alternative Songs (Billboard)	2
US Mainstream Top 40 (Billboard)	1
Vietnam (Vietnam Hot 100)	98

Chart (2026)	Peak position
Lithuania Airplay (TopHit)	95

=== Year-end charts ===
Year-end chart performance
Chart (2022)	Position
Australia (ARIA)	30
Belgium (Ultratop 50 Flanders)	48
Canada (Canadian Hot 100)	18
Denmark (Tracklisten)	50
Germany (Official German Charts)	81
Global 200 (Billboard)	108
New Zealand (Recorded Music NZ)	50
Poland (ZPAV)	63
Switzerland (Schweizer Hitparade)	81
US Billboard Hot 100	29
US Adult Contemporary (Billboard)	15
US Adult Top 40 (Billboard)	13
US Hot Rock & Alternative Songs (Billboard)	5
US Mainstream Top 40 (Billboard)	9

Chart (2023)	Position
Australia (ARIA)	50
Global 200 (Billboard)	116
Hungary (Rádiós Top 40)	38
US Adult Contemporary (Billboard)	6
US Adult Top 40 (Billboard)	26
US Hot Rock & Alternative Songs (Billboard)	5
US Radio Songs (Billboard)	60

== Certifications ==
Certifications for "Sunroof"
Region	Certification	Certified units/sales
Australia (ARIA)	4× Platinum	280,000^{‡}
Austria (IFPI Austria)	Gold	15,000^{‡}
Canada (Music Canada)	3× Platinum	240,000^{‡}
Denmark (IFPI Danmark)	Platinum	90,000^{‡}
France (SNEP)	Platinum	200,000^{‡}
Germany (BVMI)	Gold	200,000^{‡}
Hungary (MAHASZ)	Platinum	4,000^{‡}
Italy (FIMI)	Gold	50,000^{‡}
New Zealand (RMNZ)	4× Platinum	120,000^{‡}
Poland (ZPAV)	Platinum	50,000^{‡}
Portugal (AFP)	Gold	5,000^{‡}
Spain (Promusicae)	Platinum	60,000^{‡}
Switzerland (IFPI Switzerland)	Platinum	20,000^{‡}
United Kingdom (BPI)	Platinum	600,000^{‡}
United States (RIAA)	3× Platinum	3,000,000^{‡}
Streaming
Sweden (GLF)	Gold	4,000,000^{†}
^{‡} Sales+streaming figures based on certification alone.^{†} Streaming-only figures based on certification alone.
