= List of number-one club tracks of 2022 (Australia) =

ARIA Charts number-one club tracks of 2022 < 2021 2023 >

Other Australian number-one charts of 2022
- albums
- singles
- urban singles
- dance singles
- digital tracks
- streaming tracks

Top Australian singles and albums of 2022
- Triple J Hottest 100
- top 25 singles
- top 25 albums

This is the list of number-one tracks on the ARIA Club Chart in 2022, and is compiled by the Australian Recording Industry Association (ARIA) from weekly DJ reports.

== 2022 ==
| Date | | Song | Artist(s) | Reference |
|---|---|---|---|---|
| January | 3 | "Do It to It" | Acraze featuring Cherish | |
| January | 10 | "Do It to It" | Acraze featuring Cherish | |
| January | 17 | "Do It to It" | Acraze featuring Cherish | |
| January | 24 | "Rock That Beat" | Jack Truant | |
| January | 31 | "Do It to It" | Acraze featuring Cherish | |
| February | 7 | "Hollow" (Taya / Tristan Case mix) | The Journey & Rachel May featuring Alverie | |
| February | 14 | "Hollow" (Taya / Tristan Case mix) | The Journey & Rachel May featuring Alverie | |
| February | 21 | "Hollow" (Taya / Tristan Case mix) | The Journey & Rachel May featuring Alverie | |
| February | 28 | "Hollow" (Taya / Tristan Case mix) | The Journey & Rachel May featuring Alverie | |
| March | 7 | "Hollow" (Taya / Tristan Case mix) | The Journey & Rachel May featuring Alverie | |
| March | 14 | "Santorini" | Max Maxwell featuring Asia | |
| March | 21 | "Santorini" | Max Maxwell featuring Asia | |
| March | 28 | "Santorini" | Max Maxwell featuring Asia | |
| April | 4 | "Left 2 Right (Rachel May / Rosie Kate mix)" | Friendless featuring Bianca | |
| April | 11 | "Left 2 Right (Rachel May / Rosie Kate mix)" | Friendless featuring Bianca | |
| April | 18 | "Left 2 Right (Rachel May / Rosie Kate mix)" | Friendless featuring Bianca | |
| April | 25 | "Left 2 Right (Rachel May / Rosie Kate mix)" | Friendless featuring Bianca | |
| May | 2 | "Left 2 Right (Rachel May / Rosie Kate mix)" | Friendless featuring Bianca | |
| May | 9 | "Breathe (Extended Mix)" | Chusap | |
| May | 16 | "Breathe (Extended Mix)" | Chusap | |
| May | 23 | "Hypnotised (Extended Mix)" | Flash | |
| May | 30 | "Hypnotised (Extended Mix)" | Flash | |
| June | 6 | "Twenty Five Miles" | Kuhl Kuhl | |
| June | 13 | "Twenty Five Miles" | Kuhl Kuhl | |
| June | 20 | "Wake Up!" | Purple Disco Machine and Bosq featuring Kaleta | |
| June | 27 | "Testify" | Romy Black | |
| July | 4 | "Wake Up!" | Purple Disco Machine and Bosq featuring Kaleta | |
| July | 11 | "Hearts On Fire (Supermini & Frankie Romano mix)" | Ben Renna | |
| July | 18 | "Fire (Lost Fields mix)" | Andy Murphy | |
| July | 25 | "Running Up That Hill (A Deal With God)" | Sgt Slick | |
| August | 1 | "Running Up That Hill (A Deal With God)" | Sgt Slick | |
| August | 8 | "Running Up That Hill (A Deal With God)" | Sgt Slick | |
| August | 15 | "Running Up That Hill (A Deal With God)" | Sgt Slick | |
| August | 22 | "Afraid to Feel" | LF System | |
| August | 29 | "Running Up That Hill (A Deal With God)" | Sgt Slick | |
| September | 5 | "Afraid to Feel" | LF System | |
| September | 12 | "Afraid to Feel" | LF System | |
| September | 19 | "Afraid to Feel" | LF System | |
| September | 26 | "I Just Want Your Touch" | Jolyon Petch and Starley | |
| October | 3 | "I Just Want Your Touch" | Jolyon Petch and Starley | |
| October | 10 | "I Just Want Your Touch" | Jolyon Petch and Starley | |
| October | 17 | "I Just Want Your Touch" | Jolyon Petch and Starley | |
| October | 24 | "I Just Want Your Touch" | Jolyon Petch and Starley | |
| October | 31 | "B.O.T.A." | Eliza Rose and Interplanetary Criminal | |
| November | 7 | "B.O.T.A." | Eliza Rose and Interplanetary Criminal | |
| November | 14 | "Coma Cat" (Purple Disco Machine mix) | Tensnake | |
| November | 21 | "B.O.T.A." | Eliza Rose and Interplanetary Criminal | |
| November | 28 | "B.O.T.A." | Eliza Rose and Interplanetary Criminal | |
| December | 5 | "B.O.T.A." | Eliza Rose and Interplanetary Criminal | |
| December | 12 | "Got a Lot to Live for" (Original / Peewee Ferris / Rubber People / Romy Black / KEN@WORK mix) | Mark James | |
| December | 19 | "Got a Lot to Live for" (Original / Peewee Ferris / Rubber People / Romy Black / KEN@WORK mix) | Mark James | |
| December | 26 | "Don't Mess With My Man" (John Course/Sgt Slick mix) | Zoë Badwi | |

== Number-one artists ==
| Position | Artist | Weeks at No. 1 |
|---|---|---|
| 1 | Sgt Slick | 6 |
| 2 | The Journey | 5 |
| 2 | Rachel May | 5 |
| 2 | Alverie (as featuring) | 5 |
| 2 | Taya / Tristan | 5 |
| 2 | Friendless | 5 |
| 2 | Bianca (as featuring) | 5 |
| 2 | Jolyon Petch | 5 |
| 2 | Starley | 5 |
| 2 | Eliza Rose | 5 |
| 2 | Interplanetary Criminal | 5 |
| 3 | Acraze | 4 |
| 3 | Cherish | 4 |
| 3 | LF System | 4 |
| 4 | Maxwell | 3 |
| 4 | Asia (as featuring) | 3 |
| 5 | Chusap | 2 |
| 5 | Flash | 2 |
| 5 | Kuhl Kuhl | 2 |
| 5 | Purple Disco Machine | 2 |
| 5 | Bosq | 2 |
| 5 | Kaleta | 2 |
| 5 | Mark James | 2 |
| 6 | Jack Truant | 1 |
| 6 | Romy Black | 1 |
| 6 | Ben Renna | 1 |
| 6 | Andy Murphy | 1 |
| 6 | Tensnake | 1 |
| 6 | Zoë Badwi | 1 |

== See also ==
- ARIA Charts
- 2022 in music
