= Antihero (album) =

Studio album by Huskii
- Released: 11 February 2022
- Genre: Australian hip hop
- Length: 19:28
- Label: Island Australia
- Producer: Tasker

Huskii chronology
Recalled (2020)	Antihero (2022)

Singles from Antihero
- 1. "Ruin My Life" Released: 12 November 2021; 2. "Toxic" Released: 16 February 2022

Antihero is the debut studio album by Australian rapper Huskii, released on 11 February 2022 through Island Records Australia. The album is characterised by its boom bap production style, which was overseen by Sydney producer Tasker. Huskii toured in support of the album from April 2022.

Supported by the singles "Ruin My Life" and "Toxic", Antihero debuted at number one on the ARIA Albums Chart.

== Background ==
After four EPs released from 2017 to 2020, Antihero is Huskii's debut album. Although seven tracks and 19 minutes long, it is intended as his first studio album. Huskii said after spending two years "in and out of jail" he had little motivation to write songs, but after getting out and "liv[ing] life" he got back to "being motivated". He said it "made sense" to title the album Antihero because he has "related to antiheroes" and "been an outlier" his "whole life". He further described the album as "proper Sydney music that will live forever".

== Singles ==
Antihero was supported by two singles.

"Ruin My Life" was released as the lead single on 12 November 2021.

"Toxic" was released as the second single on 16 February 2022.

== Track listing ==
Antihero track listing
No.	Title	Length
1.	"Heroin Rap"	1:48
2.	"Ruin My Life"	3:19
3.	"Pulp Fiction" (featuring Grubbo)	3:23
4.	"Melted"	3:03
5.	"Cape Fear Big Wave Contest" (featuring Mic Pompeii, Ides and Shadow)	3:11
6.	"Hellevator"	0:52
7.	"Toxic"	3:52
Total length:		19:28

== Charts ==
Chart performance for Antihero
Chart (2022)	Peak position
Australian Albums (ARIA)	1
