= I'm Good (Blue) =

2022 single by David Guetta and Bebe Rexha

Single by David Guetta and Bebe Rexha
- Released: 26 August 2022
- Recorded: 2017 2022
- Genre: EDM; pop; slap house
- Length: 2:55
- Label: What a DJ; Warner
- Songwriters: David Guetta; Bebe Rexha; Gianfranco Randone; Kamille; Massimo Gabutti; Maurizio Lobina; Plested
- Producers: David Guetta; Timofey Reznikov

David Guetta singles chronology
"Take Me Back" (2022)	"I'm Good (Blue)" (2022)	"Living Without You" (2022)

Bebe Rexha singles chronology
"Break My Heart Myself" (2022)	"I'm Good (Blue)" (2022)	"Heart Wants What It Wants" (2023)

Music video
- "I'm Good (Blue)" on YouTube

"I'm Good (Blue)" is a song by French DJ and record producer David Guetta and American singer-songwriter Bebe Rexha. Produced by the former alongside Timofey Reznikov, it was written by the artists along with Kamille and Plested, with additional writing credits going to Jeffrey Jey, Massimo Gabutti, and Maurizio Lobina, as the song is a reworking of the Italian group Eiffel 65's "Blue (Da Ba Dee)" (1998). Marking the artists' fourth collaboration, the song was released for digital download and streaming by What a DJ and Warner on 26 August 2022. The song is included on Rexha's third studio album, Bebe (2023). A Latin version, featuring Lit Killah and Ludmilla, was released on 28 September 2023 and unveiled.

Despite working on the song in 2017 with no intention to release it, the artists were prompted to complete the song in 2022, after a snippet of it gained extensive popularity on social media. It is an upbeat dance-pop song that channels Rexha's excitement for a long clubbing night and the potential of an unforgettable night. The song was met with a warm reception from music critics for its lyrics, sound and collaboration between Guetta and Rexha.

"I'm Good (Blue)" garnered international success by attaining the number one position on rankings in 20 countries and securing a top 10 position in over 15 additional territories. The song reached number 4 on the Billboard Hot 100 and topped the US Dance/Electronic Songs, Dance/Mix Show Airplay and Mainstream Top 40 charts. It stands as the third longest-running chart-topper in the Dance/Electronic chart, maintaining this position for 55 weeks. The song received multiple gold and platinum certifications as well as diamond in Brazil, Mexico, France, and Poland. Among several nominations, it triumphed as the Best Collaboration at the 2022 MTV Europe Music Awards and Best Top Dance/Electronic Song at the 2023 Billboard Music Awards. The song also earned a nomination for the Best Dance/Electronic Recording at the 65th edition of the Grammy Awards. It was performed live at various occasions, among others at the American Music Awards, Brit Awards, Kids' Choice Awards, NRJ Music Awards and during the closing ceremony of the FIFA Club World Cup.

== Background and composition ==
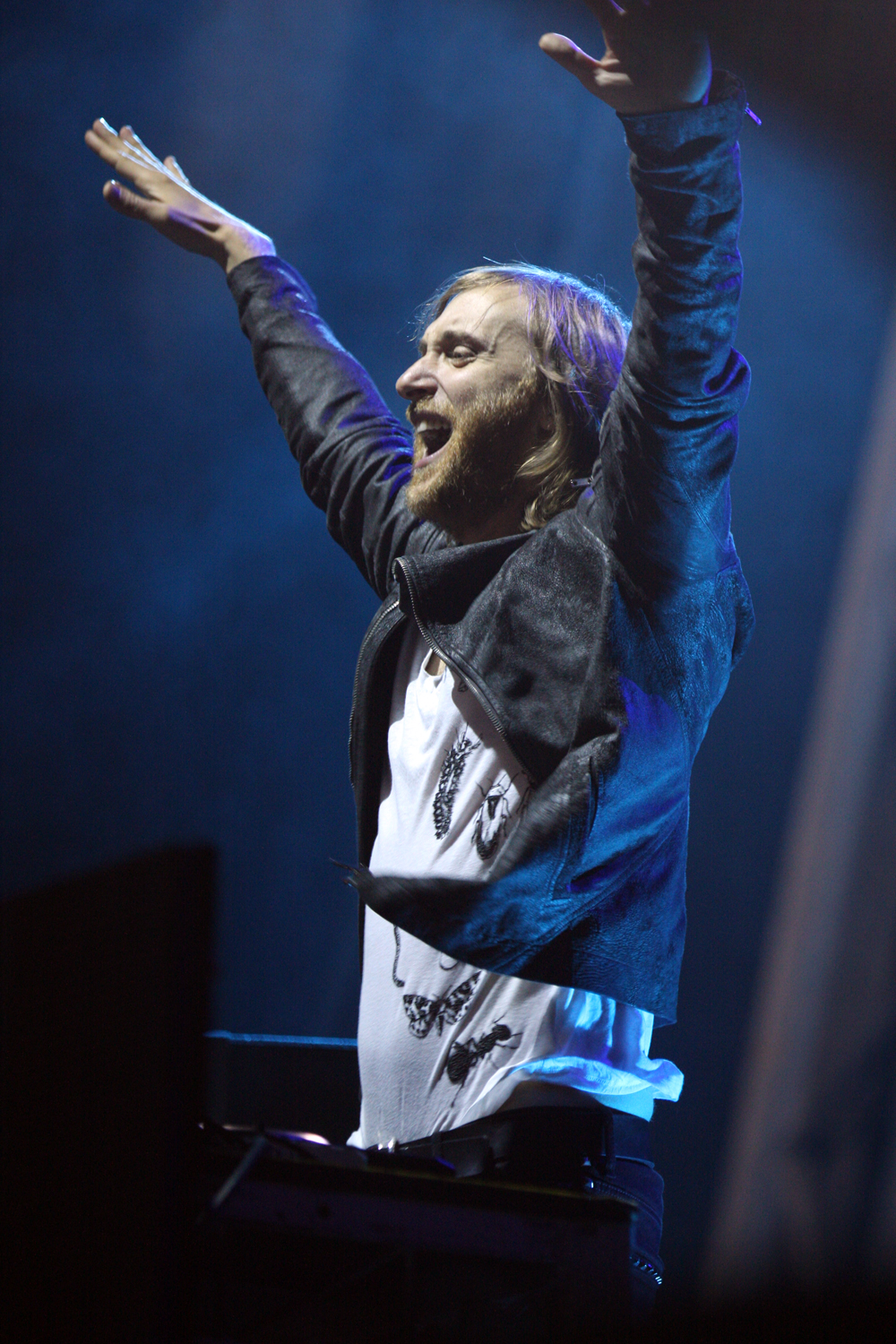
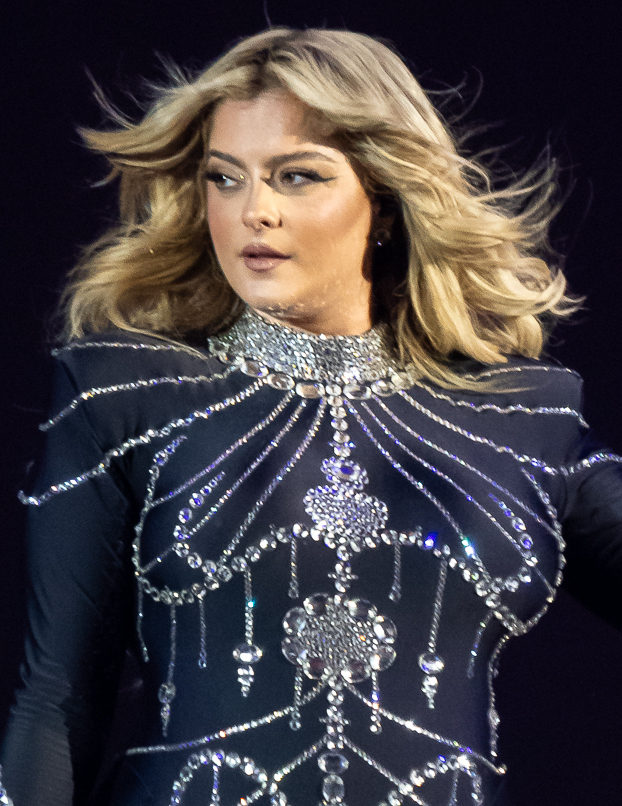
"I'm Good (Blue)" marks the fourth collaboration between David Guetta and Bebe Rexha.

In 2017, David Guetta and Bebe Rexha began working on "I'm Good (Blue)" without intending to release it at the time.

In 2022, a snippet of the song garnered sudden popularity on the social media platform TikTok, prompting Guetta and Rexha to eventually finalise the song. Rexha described the start of the collaborative effort as a "last-second session the day of". As she explained, it all started with an unplanned message on social media, while Guetta was working on a recording and writing session in London. Guetta then played Rexha a remix of a song by Italian group Eiffel 65, and they started having fun with it, without any expectation of it turning into a finished song. Leading up to its premiere, they published several videos on their respective TikTok accounts in August 2022, with Rexha lip-syncing along to the song and Guetta playing it at the Ultra Music Festival in 2017, with a caption that read, "Should we release it?". The song marks the fourth collaboration between Guetta and Rexha, after "Hey Mama" (2015), "Say My Name" (2018) and "Family" (2021), most of whom achieved commercial success. What A DJ and Warner released "I'm Good (Blue)" for digital download and streaming in various countries on 26 August. The single, accompanied by remixes from notable artists such as French disc jockey Cedric Gervais, Italian Gabry Ponte and Dutch Tiësto, was published between from September to October 2022. An acoustic rendition of the song, incorporating guitars and vocals, followed in January 2023. Furthermore, the song was included on Rexha's third studio album, Bebe (2023).

"I'm Good (Blue)" was written by Guetta, Rexha, Gianfranco Randone, Kamille, Massimo Gabutti, Maurizio Lobina and Plested, and was produced by Guetta and Timofey Reznikov. It is composed in the key of G minor and time signature of common time with a tempo of 128 beats per minute. The song follows in the chord progression of Gm in the intro, Gm–F/G–EG-Cm/G-Gm-F/G-EG in the chorus and E♭-Cm-Gm-F-E♭ in the verse. It is an upbeat dance-pop, which interpolates Italian group Eiffel 65's single "Blue (Da Ba Dee)" (1998). The vocal range of Rexha in the song spans from a low note of D_{3} to a high note of F_{5}. The lyrics of the song captures Rexha's anticipation of a long clubbing night ahead. She showcases her good mood and excitement of having one of the best nights, singing lines such as, "I'm good, yeah, I'm feelin' alright/ Baby, I'ma have the best freaking night of my life/ And wherever it takes me, I'm down for the ride."

== Critical reception ==
The critical reception of the collaboration between Guetta and Rexha in "I'm Good (Blue)" has been generally positive. Markos Papadatos from Digital Journal complimented Rexha's vocals for their "crystalline and breathy" quality, along with Guetta's "exceptional" production. Cameron Sunkel for EDM hailed the song as an "iconic jam", lauding both Rexha's "uplifting" lyrics and Guetta's production, writing that it "[adds] a biting bassline to the chorus". Billboard contributors Katie Atkinson and Keith Caulfield wrote that amidst "a sea of out-of-left-field hit songs this year ['the song'] stands out as one of the most unpredictable". Mike Wass from Idolator applauded the "iconic" sample, adding that "you can't help but be drawn into the song, if you like it or not." Neil Z. Yeung praised the song as an "EDM anthem". Franz Liesenhoff of DJ Mag found the song as a "not cheap copy or another 0815 slap house cover", complimenting the "iconic" melody and Rexha's "strong" vocals. As for Chris Vuoncino of We Rave You, the song "will only further catapult an already incredible career for [...] Rexha." Jack Spilsbury of the same publication praised Rexha's voice and found the song "exciting and thrilling, containing energy to accompany every club night or festival mainstage". Mike Wass for Variety wrote that, "With six hit collaborations to their credit creative, [their] chemistry is undeniable". Katrin Elsner for Westdeutscher Rundfunk (WDR) commented that, "It's such an earworm that ['the song'] became a hit even before its official release". Bradley Stern for MuuMuse similarly explained that, "[it] is an obvious earworm, and a clear school dance/wedding/bar mitzvah smash in the making, on the level of Black Eyed Peas' ['I Got a Feeling']". Maura Johnston from the Boston Globe praised Rexha as a "robust-voiced" artist and Guetta's incorporation of the "insistent hook" and "parenthetical title" from "Blue (Da Ba Dee)" into the song. Annabel Ross for Mixmag labeled the song as a "smash" but found the song "somehow even more inane than Eiffel 65's bizarre word salad".

== Commercial performance ==
In the United States, the song attained a position within the top 10 on the Billboard Hot 100 chart in November 2022, reaching its peak at number four on the issue dated 14 January 2023. Topping the Dance/Electronic Songs, Dance/Mix Show Airplay and Mainstream Top 40 charts, it further peaked at number two on the Adult Top 40 and number 21 on the Rhythmic rankings. The song maintained number one position on the Dance/Electronic Songs chart for a total of 55 weeks, marking the second longest-running chart-topper in the ranking's history. Rexha also holds the record as the longest-charting female artist at the number one position on the chart. In June 2023, it received double platinum certification from the Recording Industry Association of America (RIAA) for shifting more than 2,000,000 units in the US. In Canada, the song reached number one on the Canadian Hot 100 on 24 September 2022 and entered the top 50 on the Canada AC, Canada CHR/Top 40 and Canada Hot AC rankings. In July 2023, it garnered a 9× platinum certification from Music Canada (MC) for selling more than 720,000 copies in Canada.

In Australia, the song also peaked at number one the ARIA Singles Chart on 25 September 2022 and reached number four on the New Zealand Singles Chart on 19 September in New Zealand. In 2023, it received double platinum certification from the Recorded Music New Zealand (RMNZ) in New Zealand and quadruple platinum award from the Australian Recording Industry Association (ARIA) in Australia for shifting more than 60,000 and 280,000 units, respectively. In the United Kingdom, the song peaked at number one on the UK Singles Chart on 23 September 2022 and became Guetta's seventh and Rexha's first number one single in the ranking. In November 2024, it garnered a triple platinum certification from the British Phonographic Industry (BPI) for selling more than 1,800,000 copies in the UK. During the New Year's Eve 2022, the song reached number one on the Spotify's global chart and surpassed more than of 11.6 million streams, reentering the UK Singles Chart at number 10.

"I'm Good (Blue)" achieved number one on the rankings in Austria, Belgium, Denmark, Finland, Germany, Greece, Hungary, Iceland, Luxembourg, Netherlands, Norway, Poland, Sweden and Switzerland. The song reached the top 10 in Bulgaria, the Commonwealth of Independent States (CIS), Croatia, the Czech Republic, France, Ireland, Italy, Latvia, Lebanon, Lithuania, New Zealand, Portugal, Russia, Singapore, Slovakia and Ukraine. It also entered the top 20 in Costa Rica, El Salvador, Honduras, India, Malaysia, Panama, Puerto Rico and Spain. "I'm Good (Blue)" achieved several certifications in various countries, including gold in Argentina, double platinum in Denmark and Germany, triple platinum in Italy, and quadruple platinum in Austria, Portugal and Spain. Furthermore, it attained diamond certifications in France, Mexico and Poland along with double diamond status in Brazil.

== Impact ==
The success of "I'm Good (Blue)" coincided with a broader resurgence of dance music and Eurodance in mainstream pop during the early 2020s. In a November 2022 discussion, Billboard described the song as part of a year in which numerous hits were built around samples and interpolations of past songs, while Andrew Unterberger characterized its sound as "post-peak EDM" and noted that a song with that particular sound had not appeared prominently on radio or streaming for some time. Billboard staffers further suggested that the revival of older songs through TikTok and other digital platforms would continue to affect the charts in the years that followed. Official Charts described the song's rise as part of the "dance music domination" of summer 2022.

The song also contributed to renewed interest in Eiffel 65's "Blue (Da Ba Dee)", the 1998 Eurodance song on which it is based. In December 2022, music-industry analytics publication Chartmetric examined "I'm Good (Blue)" as an example of a contemporary hit bringing renewed attention to an older catalog, reporting that the canonical radio edit of "Blue (Da Ba Dee)" had seen a 5.27% increase in Spotify plays since mid-August and a 14% increase in TikTok usage following the release of the Guetta and Rexha song. In 2023, Chartmetric identified "I'm Good (Blue)" as one of the central examples of a wider revival of 1990s Eurodance, alongside contemporary songs that drew on other dance hits from the period; the publication reported that "Blue (Da Ba Dee)" had gained an additional 110.5 million Spotify streams since "I'm Good (Blue)" was released in August 2022.

In coverage of the Best Pop Dance Recording category at the 2024 Grammy Awards, the Grammy Awards described David Guetta, Anne-Marie and Coi Leray's "Baby Don't Hurt Me" as a "fitting follow-up" to "I'm Good (Blue)". The comparison presented both songs as part of the same broader trend of contemporary dance productions giving modern treatments to earlier dance hits, with "Baby Don't Hurt Me" drawing on Haddaway's 1993 song "What Is Love".

== Accolades ==
In 2022, "I'm Good (Blue)" won an award in the category for the Best Collaboration at the MTV Europe Music Awards. Rexha was one of three ethnic Albanian artists, who were nominated in the same category on the same occasion. The song garnered a nomination for the International Song of the Year and Recovery/Adaptation at the NRJ Music Award. In 2023, it received nominations for the Best International Song at the Brit Awards, the Best Collaboration at the MTV Video Music Awards, along with the Dance Song of the Year and Favorite Use of a Sample at the iHeartRadio Music Awards. The song won an award in the category for the Top Dance/Electronic Song at the Billboard Music Awards and garnered two other nominations for the Top Collaboration and Top Global (Excl. U.S.) Song. Marking Rexha's third and Guetta's 11th nomination to date, the song was further nominated for the Best Dance/Electronic Recording at the Grammy Awards. Following its debut in which it amassed more than 140 million streams, the song achieved a significant milestone of over one billion streams worldwide in late January 2023. In 2023, it was ranked as the 14th and 31st most-streamed song on Spotify and Apple, respectively. Also in 2023, Billboard included it in its year-end lists of the best songs of the year.

== Music video ==
Preceded by the release of a lyric video on 26 August 2022, the official music video for "I'm Good (Blue)" premiered to YouTube on 20 September 2022. Behind-the-scenes footage from different stages of filming was published on the platform on 30 November. Directed by KC Locke of Swords & Eagles, the music video was filmed in September at various locations spanning across the Spanish island of Ibiza, including at the renowned Ushuaïa nightclub. The music video begins with a sequence as the camera descends through a cloudy sky, transitioning to the portrayal of Guetta playing a synthesizer in an indoor setting. Following this, Rexha enters the subsequent scene, delivering a performance on a yacht surrounded by the sea. The scenes then transition to a mansion setting, portraying a gathering of individuals, including Guetta and Rexha. The video further progresses into a live performance scene at Ushuaïa, featuring both artists captivating a substantial crowd. Throughout the video, interspersed shots showcase Guetta and Rexha separately at different locations, each delivering performances of the song. The culmination of these sequences leads to a moment as the artists come together before their joint performance at Ushuaïa. During the filming process, Rexha revealed that the team had to take a brief break due to motion sickness, adding, "But I knew that if I threw up, it would make it worse. [...] So I was like, I cannot throw up. I can't".

== Live performances ==
On 13 November 2022, Guetta and Rexha premiered their collaboration "I'm Good (Blue)" for the first time at the MTV Europe Music Awards, delivering a blue and black-themed show. During the performance, Guetta mixed live on a podium while Rexha was accompanied by a group of blue-dressed dancers. Following this, Rexha went on to perform the song by herself at the NRJ Music Awards in France on 18 November and at the American Music Awards in the US on 20 November. At the latter event and during her futuristic-described show, the singer was similarly joined by a team of professional dancers throughout the performance. She wore a metallic, silver and black leather bodysuit with metallic fabric highlights and a pair of low-heeled pointed-toe black leather boots. On 24 November, Guetta and Rexha reunited to further perform the song during the halftime show of the Detroit Lions Thanksgiving Day match. On 11 February 2023, Guetta performed the song independently at the Brit Awards in the UK, with British singer Sam Ryder filling in for Rexha. Rexha continued her live performances at the Kids' Choice Awards on 4 March. A distinctive rendition occurred on 19 November, when Rexha presented a slowed-down orchestral version of the song, accompanied by a string section. On 22 December, Guetta and Rexha delivered another performance of the song at the closing ceremony of the FIFA Club World Cup.

== Track listing ==
- Digital download and streaming
1. "I'm Good (Blue)" – 2:55
2. "I'm Good (Blue)" (Extended) – 3:39
- Digital download and streaming
1. "I'm Good (Blue)" (Acoustic) – 2:18
- Digital download and streaming – Remixes #1
1. "I'm Good (Blue)" – 2:55
2. "I'm Good (Blue)" (Tiësto Remix) – 2:58
3. "I'm Good (Blue)" (Cedric Gervais Remix) – 2:59
4. "I'm Good (Blue)" (Brooks Remix) – 2:49
5. "I'm Good (Blue)" (DJs from Mars Remix) – 2:43
- Digital download and streaming – Remixes #2
1. "I'm Good (Blue)" (Oliver Heldens Remix) – 3:06
2. "I'm Good (Blue)" (R3hab Remix) – 2:47
3. "I'm Good (Blue)" (Gabry Ponte Remix) – 2:45
4. "I'm Good (Blue)" (Header Remix) – 3:42
5. "I'm Good (Blue)" (Ralph Wegner Remix) – 2:58
6. "I'm Good (Blue)" – 2:55
- Digital download and streaming – 2023 version
1. "I'm Good (Blue) (feat. LIT Killah & LUDMILLA) [2023 Version] – 2:41

== Credits and personnel ==
Credits adapted from Spotify and Tidal.

- David Guetta – lead artist, production, programming, songwriting
- Bebe Rexha – lead artist, songwriting
- AHH – additional production
- Bryce Bordone – assistant mixing engineer
- Gianfranco Randone – songwriting
- Kamille – songwriting
- Massimo Gabutti – songwriting
- Maurizio Lobina – songwriting
- Mitch Allan – vocal production
- Plested – songwriting
- Serban Ghenea – mixing
- Timofey Reznikov – mastering, mixing, production, programming

== Charts ==
=== Weekly charts ===
Weekly chart performance
Chart (2022–2024)	Peak position
Argentina Hot 100 (Billboard)	53
Australia (ARIA)	1
Australia Dance (ARIA)	1
Austria (Ö3 Austria Top 40)	1
Belarus Airplay (TopHit)	2
Belgium (Ultratop 50 Flanders)	1
Belgium (Ultratop 50 Wallonia)	1
Brazil Airplay (Crowley Charts)	70
Bulgaria Airplay (PROPHON)	2
Canada Hot 100 (Billboard)	1
Canada AC (Billboard)	2
Canada CHR/Top 40 (Billboard)	1
Canada Hot AC (Billboard)	1
CIS Airplay (TopHit)	5
Costa Rica (Monitor Latino)	20
Croatia International Airplay (Top lista)	2
Czech Republic Airplay (ČNS IFPI)	7
Czech Republic Singles Digital (ČNS IFPI)	1
Denmark (Tracklisten)	1
El Salvador (Monitor Latino)	17
Estonia Airplay (TopHit)	29
Finland (Suomen virallinen lista)	1
France (SNEP)	4
Germany (GfK)	1
Germany Dance (Official German Charts)	1
Global 200 (Billboard)	2
Greece International (IFPI)	1
Honduras (Monitor Latino)	14
Hungary (Dance Top 40)	1
Hungary (Rádiós Top 40)	1
Hungary (Single Top 40)	1
Hungary (Stream Top 40)	3
Iceland (Tónlistinn)	1
India International (IMI)	18
Ireland (IRMA)	2
Italy (FIMI)	7
Japan Hot Overseas (Billboard)	17
Kazakhstan Airplay (TopHit)	4
Latvia Airplay (LaIPA)	2
Latvia Streaming (LaIPA)	1
Lebanon (Lebanese Top 20)	2
Lithuania (AGATA)	2
Luxembourg Songs (Billboard)	1
Malaysia International (RIM)	19
Moldova Airplay (TopHit)	1
Netherlands (Dutch Top 40)	1
Netherlands (Single Top 100)	1
New Zealand (Recorded Music NZ)	4
Nigeria (TurnTable Top 100)	39
Norway (VG-lista)	1
Panama (Monitor Latino)	11
Poland Airplay (ZPAV)	1
Poland (Polish Streaming Top 100)	3
Portugal (AFP)	9
Puerto Rico (Monitor Latino)	12
Romania (UPFR)	2
Russia Airplay (TopHit)	8
Singapore (RIAS)	6
Slovakia Airplay (ČNS IFPI)	1
Slovakia Singles Digital (ČNS IFPI)	1
South Africa Streaming (TOSAC)	9
Spain (Promusicae)	18
Sweden (Sverigetopplistan)	1
Switzerland (Schweizer Hitparade)	1
Turkey International Airplay (Radiomonitor Türkiye)	2
Ukraine Airplay (TopHit)	2
UK Singles (Official Charts)	1
UK Dance (Official Charts)	1
US Billboard Hot 100	4
US Adult Contemporary (Billboard)	6
US Adult Pop Airplay (Billboard)	1
US Hot Dance/Electronic Songs (Billboard)	1
US Pop Airplay (Billboard)	1
US Rhythmic Airplay (Billboard)	21
Venezuela (Record Report)	56

=== Monthly charts ===
Monthly chart performance
Chart (2022–2023)	Peak position
Belarus Airplay (TopHit)	6
CIS Airplay (TopHit)	4
Czech Republic (Rádio – Top 100)	6
Czech Republic (Singles Digitál – Top 100)	1
Estonia Airplay (TopHit)	42
Kazakhstan Airplay (TopHit)	9
Lithuania Airplay (TopHit)	5
Moldova Airplay (TopHit)	1
Romania Airplay (TopHit)	2
Russia Airplay (TopHit)	15
Slovakia (Rádio – Top 100)	1
Slovakia (Singles Digitál – Top 100)	2
Ukraine Airplay (TopHit)	4

=== Year-end charts ===
2022 year-end chart performance
Chart (2022)	Position
Australia (ARIA)	25
Australia Dance (ARIA)	3
Austria (Ö3 Austria Top 40)	31
Belgium (Ultratop 50 Flanders)	32
Belgium (Ultratop 50 Wallonia)	39
Canada (Canadian Hot 100)	41
CIS Airplay (TopHit)	91
Croatia International Airplay (Top lista)	79
Denmark (Tracklisten)	24
France (SNEP)	69
Germany (GfK)	30
Global 200 (Billboard)	93
Hungary (Dance Top 100)	36
Hungary (Single Top 100)	8
Hungary (Stream Top 100)	23
Iceland (Tónlistinn)	22
Italy (FIMI)	73
Lithuania (AGATA)	41
Netherlands (Dutch Top 40)	11
Netherlands (Single Top 100)	20
Poland (ZPAV)	57
Russia Airplay (TopHit)	160
Sweden (Sverigetopplistan)	20
Switzerland (Schweizer Hitparade)	16
UK Singles (OCC)	25
US Hot Dance/Electronic Songs (Billboard)	7

2023 year-end chart performance
Chart (2023)	Position
Australia (ARIA)	23
Austria (Ö3 Austria Top 40)	4
Belarus Airplay (TopHit)	18
Belgium (Ultratop 50 Flanders)	14
Belgium (Ultratop 50 Wallonia)	15
Brazil Streaming (Pro-Música Brasil)	126
Canada (Canadian Hot 100)	4
CIS Airplay (TopHit)	8
Denmark (Tracklisten)	22
Estonia Airplay (TopHit)	60
Germany (GfK)	5
Global 200 (Billboard)	8
Hungary (Dance Top 100)	1
Hungary (Rádiós Top 100)	1
Hungary (Single Top 100)	61
Iceland (Tónlistinn)	24
Italy (FIMI)	49
Kazakhstan Airplay (TopHit)	79
Lithuania Airplay (TopHit)	11
Moldova Airplay (TopHit)	4
Netherlands (Dutch Top 40)	54
Netherlands (Single Top 100)	12
New Zealand (Recorded Music NZ)	29
Poland (Polish Airplay Top 100)	52
Poland (Polish Streaming Top 100)	25
Romania Airplay (TopHit)	4
Russia Airplay (TopHit)	45
Sweden (Sverigetopplistan)	16
Switzerland (Schweizer Hitparade)	4
Ukraine Airplay (TopHit)	5
UK Singles (OCC)	13
US Billboard Hot 100	10
US Adult Contemporary (Billboard)	7
US Adult Top 40 (Billboard)	3
US Hot Dance/Electronic Songs (Billboard)	1
US Mainstream Top 40 (Billboard)	8

2024 year-end chart performance
Chart (2024)	Position
Australia Dance (ARIA)	7
Austria (Ö3 Austria Top 40)	51
Belarus Airplay (TopHit)	69
Belgium (Ultratop 50 Wallonia)	96
CIS Airplay (TopHit)	65
France (SNEP)	93
Germany (GfK)	57
Global 200 (Billboard)	55
Hungary (Dance Top 40)	6
Hungary (Rádiós Top 40)	24
Hungary (Single Top 40)	85
Lithuania Airplay (TopHit)	44
Netherlands (Single Top 100)	97
Portugal (AFP)	107
Switzerland (Schweizer Hitparade)	26
US Adult Contemporary (Billboard)	11
US Hot Dance/Electronic Songs (Billboard)	11

2025 year-end chart performance
Chart (2025)	Position
Belarus Airplay (TopHit)	73
CIS Airplay (TopHit)	177
Estonia Airplay (TopHit)	100
Hungary (Dance Top 40)	60
Lithuania Airplay (TopHit)	77

== Certifications ==
Certifications
Region	Certification	Certified units/sales
Argentina (CAPIF)	Gold	10,000^{‡}
Australia (ARIA)	4× Platinum	280,000^{‡}
Austria (IFPI Austria)	4× Platinum	120,000^{‡}
Brazil (Pro-Música Brasil)	2× Diamond	320,000^{‡}
Canada (Music Canada)	9× Platinum	720,000^{‡}
Denmark (IFPI Danmark)	3× Platinum	270,000^{‡}
France (SNEP)	Diamond	333,333^{‡}
Germany (BVMI)	2× Platinum	1,200,000^{‡}
Italy (FIMI)	4× Platinum	400,000^{‡}
Mexico (AMPROFON)	Diamond	700,000^{‡}
New Zealand (RMNZ)	4× Platinum	120,000^{‡}
Poland (ZPAV)	Diamond	250,000^{‡}
Portugal (AFP)	5× Platinum	50,000^{‡}
Spain (Promusicae)	4× Platinum	240,000^{‡}
Switzerland (IFPI Switzerland)	8× Platinum	160,000^{‡}
United Kingdom (BPI)	3× Platinum	1,800,000^{‡}
United States (RIAA)	2× Platinum	2,000,000^{‡}
Streaming
Slovakia (ČNS IFPI)	Platinum	1,700,000^{†}
^{‡} Sales+streaming figures based on certification alone.^{†} Streaming-only figures based on certification alone.

== Release history ==
Release dates and formats
Region	Date	Format(s)	Label(s)	Ref.
Various	26 August 2022	Digital download; streaming	What a DJ; Warner Records	
Italy	26 August 2022	Radio airplay	Warner Records	
United Kingdom	26 August 2022	Various	Parlophone UK	
United States	13 September 2022	Adult contemporary radio	Warner Records	
United States	13 September 2022	Contemporary hit radio	Warner Records	

== See also ==
- Billboard Year-End Hot 100 singles of 2023
- List of Canadian Hot 100 number-one singles of 2022
- List of Canadian Hot 100 number-one singles of 2023
- List of Dutch Top 40 number-one singles of 2022
- List of Media Forest most-broadcast songs of the 2020s in Romania
- List of Billboard number-one dance songs of 2022
- List of Billboard number-one dance songs of 2023
- List of number-one dance singles of 2022 (Australia)
- List of number-one dance singles of 2023 (Australia)
- List of number-one hits of 2022 (Denmark)
- List of number-one hits of 2022 (Switzerland)
- List of number-one hits of 2023 (Switzerland)
- List of number-one hits of 2023 (Germany)
- List of number-one singles of 2022 (Australia)
- List of number-one singles of 2022 (Finland)
- List of number-one singles of 2023 (Finland)
- List of number-one singles of the 2020s (Sweden)
- List of number-one songs of the 2020s (Slovakia)
- List of Ultratop 50 number-one singles of 2022
- List of Ultratop 50 number-one singles of 2023
- List of UK Dance Singles Chart number ones of 2022
- List of UK Singles Chart number ones of the 2020s
- Catsuits and bodysuits in popular media
- Blue (Da Ba Dee)
- "Just a Little" – by Liberty X
