= Huskii =

Australian rapper and musician

- Born: Ben Hayden; 1992 (age 33–34)
- Origin: Wollongong, New South Wales, Australia
- Genres: Australian hip hop
- Occupations: Rapper; singer; songwriter; musician
- Years active: 2016–present
- Labels: brainumb; Island Australia

Ben Hayden (born 1992), known professionally as Huskii, is an Australian rapper and musician from Wollongong, New South Wales. He released his debut studio album Antihero in February 2022.

== Early life ==
Hayden grew up in various homes around New South Wales and was exposed to violence, drug addiction and prostitution during his turbulent childhood, later falling victim to addiction, depression and incarceration in his teenage years.

== Personal life ==
In 2022, Hayden was charged with domestic violence offences. The details of the charges were reported by The Daily Telegraph.

== Career ==
=== 2016–2020 ===
In October 2016, Huskii released Barely Awake and Paranoid with songs appearing on YouTube channel HustleHard Television. This was followed in 2017 with Brainumb. In 2019, Huskii released 4 Days, a collaborative EP with longtime friend Chillinit. In 2020 he released his ep titled “Recalled”.

=== 2021–present: Antihero ===
On 12 November 2021, Huskii released the single "Ruin My Life". His debut studio album Antihero was released on 11 February 2022. "Toxic" was released as the album's second single on 16 February 2022.

== Discography ==
=== Studio albums ===
List of studio albums, with release date, label, and selected chart positions shown
| Title | Details | Peak chart positions |
| Title | Details | AUS |
|---|---|---|
| Antihero | Released: 11 February 2022; Label: Ben Hayden, Island Records Australia (4518106); Format: CD, digital download, streaming | 1 |

=== Extended plays ===
List of EPs, with release date and label shown
| Title | Details |
|---|---|
| Barely Awake and Paranoid | Released: 8 October 2016; Label: Brainumb; Format: Digital download, streaming |
| Brainumb | Released: May 2017; Label: 201; Format: Digital download, streaming |
| 4 Days (with Chillinit) | Released: 20 December 2019; Label: 420 Family; Format: Digital download, streaming |
| Recalled | Released: 9 November 2020; Label: Brainumb; Format: Digital download, streaming |

=== Singles ===
List of singles, with year released, selected chart positions and album name shown
| Title | Year | Peak chart positions | Album |
| Title | Year | AUS | Album |
|---|---|---|---|
| "Ruin My Life" | 2021 | — | Antihero |
| "Toxic" | 2022 | — (Note: "Toxic" did not enter the ARIA Singles Chart, but did peak at number 20 on the ARIA Top 20 Australian Hip Hop/R&B Singles Chart.) | Antihero |
