= List of number-one urban singles of 2022 (Australia) =

ARIA Charts number-one urban singles of 2022 < 2021 2023 >

Other Australian number-one charts of 2022
- albums
- singles
- dance singles
- club tracks
- digital tracks
- streaming tracks

Top Australian singles and albums of 2022
- Triple J Hottest 100
- top 25 singles
- top 25 albums

The ARIA Urban Chart is a chart that ranks the best-performing Urban tracks singles of Australia. It is published by the Australian Recording Industry Association (ARIA), an organisation who collect music data for the weekly ARIA Charts. To be eligible to appear on the chart, the recording must be a single of a predominantly urban nature.

== Chart history ==
Issue date	Song	Artist(s)	Reference
3 January	"Stay"	The Kid Laroi and Justin Bieber	
10 January	"Stay"	The Kid Laroi and Justin Bieber	
17 January	"Stay"	The Kid Laroi and Justin Bieber	
24 January	"Stay"	The Kid Laroi and Justin Bieber	
31 January	"Stay"	The Kid Laroi and Justin Bieber	
7 February	"Stay"	The Kid Laroi and Justin Bieber	
14 February	"Stay"	The Kid Laroi and Justin Bieber	
21 February	"Stay"	The Kid Laroi and Justin Bieber	
28 February	"Stay"	The Kid Laroi and Justin Bieber	
7 March	"Stay"	The Kid Laroi and Justin Bieber	
14 March	"Stay"	The Kid Laroi and Justin Bieber	
21 March	"Stay"	The Kid Laroi and Justin Bieber	
28 March	"Stay"	The Kid Laroi and Justin Bieber	
4 April	"Stay"	The Kid Laroi and Justin Bieber	
11 April	"Stay"	The Kid Laroi and Justin Bieber	
18 April	"First Class"	Jack Harlow	
25 April	"First Class"	Jack Harlow	
2 May	"First Class"	Jack Harlow	
9 May	"First Class"	Jack Harlow	
16 May	"First Class"	Jack Harlow	
23 May	"First Class"	Jack Harlow	
30 May	"First Class"	Jack Harlow	
6 June	"First Class"	Jack Harlow	
13 June	"First Class"	Jack Harlow	
20 June	"First Class"	Jack Harlow	
27 June	"First Class"	Jack Harlow	
4 July	"First Class"	Jack Harlow	
11 July	"First Class"	Jack Harlow	
18 July	"First Class"	Jack Harlow	
25 July	"First Class"	Jack Harlow	
1 August	"Bad Habit"	Steve Lacy	
8 August	"Doja"	Central Cee	
15 August	"Bad Habit"	Steve Lacy	
22 August	"Bad Habit"	Steve Lacy	
29 August	"Super Freaky Girl"	Nicki Minaj	
5 September	"Super Freaky Girl"	Nicki Minaj	
12 September	"Super Freaky Girl"	Nicki Minaj	
19 September	"Super Freaky Girl"	Nicki Minaj	
26 September	"Super Freaky Girl"	Nicki Minaj	
3 October	"Super Freaky Girl"	Nicki Minaj	
10 October	"Super Freaky Girl"	Nicki Minaj	
17 October	"Bad Habit"	Steve Lacy	
24 October	"Bad Habit"	Steve Lacy	
31 October	"Bad Habit"	Steve Lacy	
7 November	"Lift Me Up"	Rihanna	
14 November	"Rich Flex"	Drake and 21 Savage	
21 November	"Rich Flex"	Drake and 21 Savage	
28 November	"Rich Flex"	Drake and 21 Savage	
5 December	"Rich Flex"	Drake and 21 Savage	
12 December	"Creepin'"	Metro Boomin, The Weeknd and 21 Savage	
19 December	"Kill Bill"	SZA	
26 December	"Kill Bill"	SZA	

== See also ==
- 2022 in music
- List of number-one singles of 2022 (Australia)
