= List of number-one singles of 2022 (Australia) =

ARIA Charts number-one singles of 2022 < 2021 2023 >

Other Australian number-one charts of 2022
- albums
- urban singles
- dance singles
- club tracks
- digital tracks
- streaming tracks

Top Australian singles and albums of 2022
- Triple J Hottest 100
- top 25 singles
- top 25 albums

The ARIA Singles Chart ranks the best-performing singles in Australia. Its data, published by the Australian Recording Industry Association, is based collectively on the weekly physical and digital sales and streams of singles. Fourteen songs topped the chart in 2022, with Mariah Carey's "All I Want for Christmas Is You" topping the chart in a fourth separate year, "Cold Heart (Pnau remix)" by Elton John and Dua Lipa returning to number one after spending five weeks at number one in 2021, and "Stay" by the Kid Laroi and Justin Bieber returning to number one as well, after its 14-week stay at number one in 2021. The best-performing song of 2021 in Australia, "Heat Waves" by British band Glass Animals, also returned to number one after six weeks atop the chart in early 2021. As It Was by Harry Styles was the best-performing song of 2022, spending a total of 8 non-consecutive weeks at number one.

Kate Bush's 1985 song "Running Up That Hill (A Deal with God)" returned to the chart dated 6 June, and topped the chart the following week, after being featured in season 4 of Netflix series Stranger Things. It marks Bush's second number-one single in Australia after "Wuthering Heights" in 1978.

Blackpink became the first K-pop group to top the singles chart with "Pink Venom" debuting atop the chart dated 29 August.

Six artists, Jack Harlow, Joji, Blackpink, Nicki Minaj, Bebe Rexha and Kim Petras, reached the top for the first time. Elton John reached the top twice in the same year, with "Cold Heart (Pnau remix)" and "Hold Me Closer".

== Chart history ==
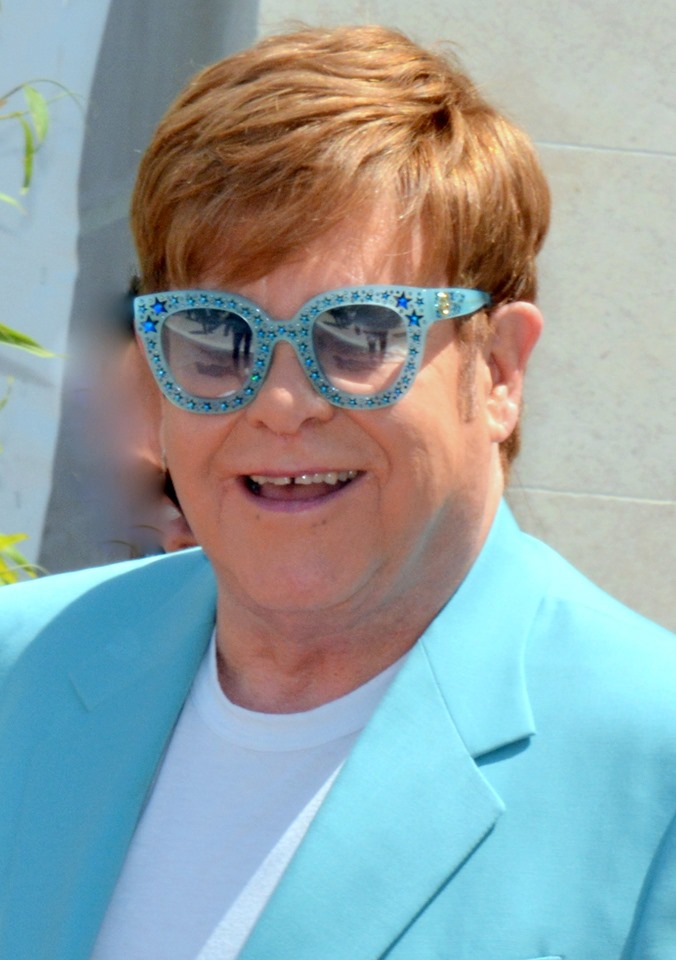
British singer, pianist and composer Elton John earned two number-one singles in 2022 with "Cold Heart (Pnau remix)", a duet with British-Albanian singer Dua Lipa, that began its run atop the chart in 2021, and "Hold Me Closer", a collaboration with American singer Britney Spears.

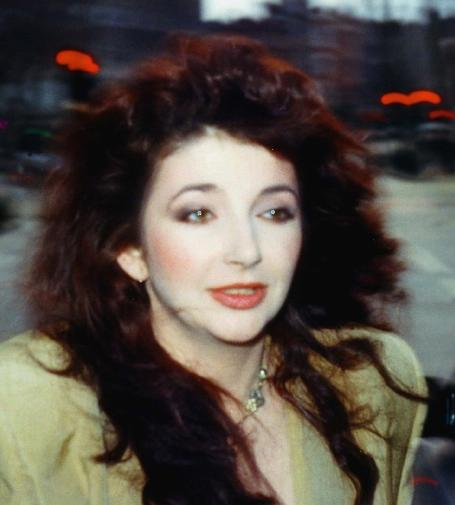
British singer-songwriter Kate Bush returned to the chart with "Running Up That Hill (A Deal with God)", a song that initially charted in 1985. It reached number one for the first time after being featured in season 4 of Netflix series Stranger Things. It marks Bush's second number-one single after "Wuthering Heights" in 1978, spending nine weeks at the top.

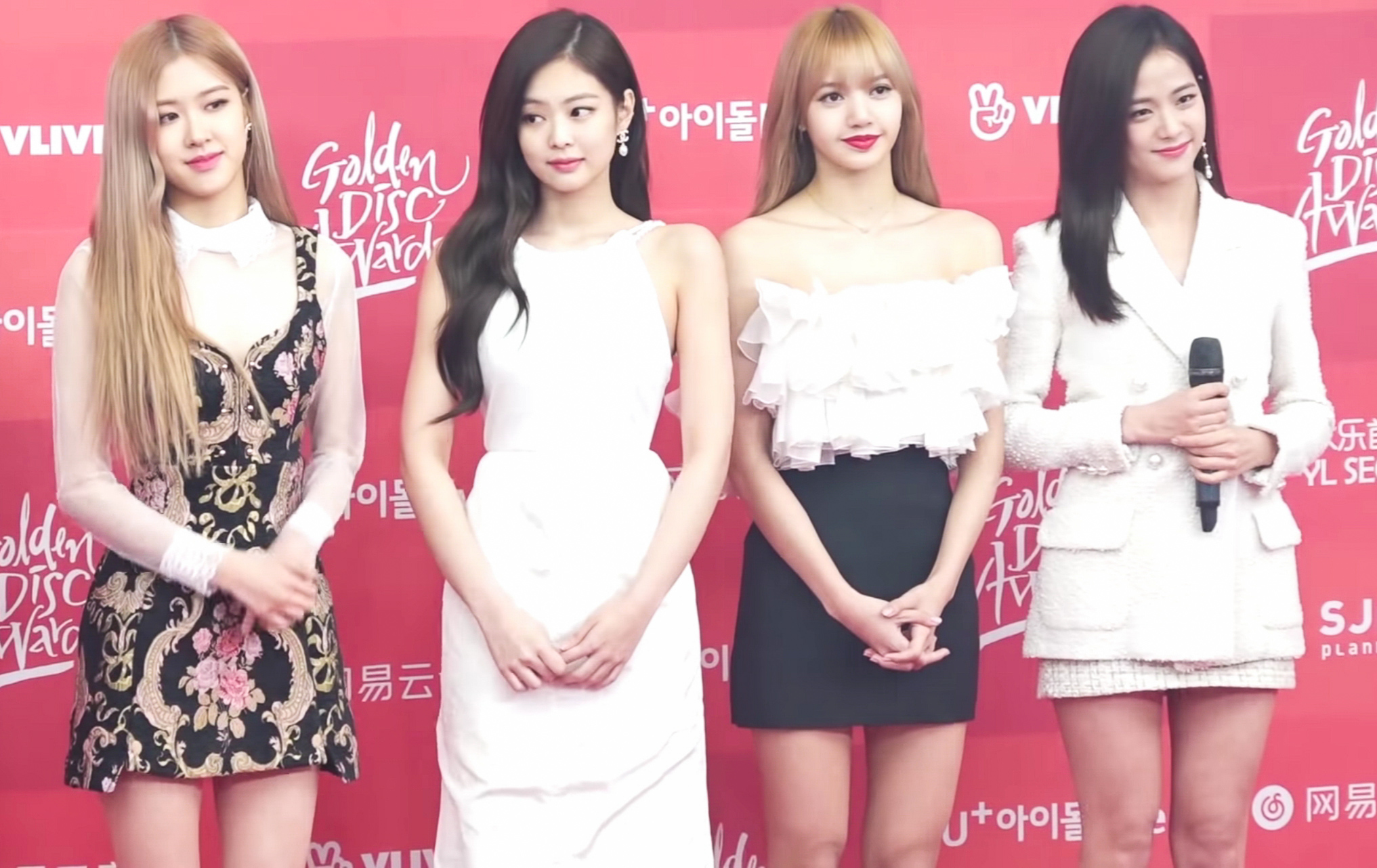
South Korean girl group Blackpink became the first K-pop group to top the singles chart with "Pink Venom". It spent one week atop the chart after debuting in the top spot in August.

Key
†	Indicates best-performing single of 2022

List of number-one singles
Issue date	Song	Artist(s)	Ref.
3 January	"All I Want for Christmas Is You"	Mariah Carey	
10 January	"Cold Heart (Pnau remix)"	Elton John and Dua Lipa	
17 January	"Cold Heart (Pnau remix)"	Elton John and Dua Lipa	
24 January	"Cold Heart (Pnau remix)"	Elton John and Dua Lipa	
31 January	"Stay"	The Kid Laroi and Justin Bieber	
7 February	"Stay"	The Kid Laroi and Justin Bieber	
14 February	"Stay"	The Kid Laroi and Justin Bieber	
21 February	"Cold Heart (Pnau remix)"	Elton John and Dua Lipa	
28 February	"Cold Heart (Pnau remix)"	Elton John and Dua Lipa	
7 March	"Heat Waves"	Glass Animals	
14 March	"Heat Waves"	Glass Animals	
21 March	"Heat Waves"	Glass Animals	
28 March	"Heat Waves"	Glass Animals	
4 April	"Heat Waves"	Glass Animals	
11 April	"As It Was" †	Harry Styles	
18 April	"First Class"	Jack Harlow	
25 April	"First Class"	Jack Harlow	
2 May	"As It Was" †	Harry Styles	
9 May	"As It Was" †	Harry Styles	
16 May	"As It Was" †	Harry Styles	
23 May	"As It Was" †	Harry Styles	
30 May	"As It Was" †	Harry Styles	
6 June	"As It Was" †	Harry Styles	
13 June	"Running Up That Hill (A Deal with God)"	Kate Bush	
20 June	"Running Up That Hill (A Deal with God)"	Kate Bush	
27 June	"Glimpse of Us"	Joji	
4 July	"Running Up That Hill (A Deal with God)"	Kate Bush	
11 July	"Running Up That Hill (A Deal with God)"	Kate Bush	
18 July	"Running Up That Hill (A Deal with God)"	Kate Bush	
25 July	"Running Up That Hill (A Deal with God)"	Kate Bush	
1 August	"Running Up That Hill (A Deal with God)"	Kate Bush	
8 August	"Running Up That Hill (A Deal with God)"	Kate Bush	
15 August	"Running Up That Hill (A Deal with God)"	Kate Bush	
22 August	"As It Was" †	Harry Styles	
29 August	"Pink Venom"	Blackpink	
5 September	"Hold Me Closer"	Elton John and Britney Spears	
12 September	"Super Freaky Girl"	Nicki Minaj	
19 September	"I'm Good (Blue)"	David Guetta and Bebe Rexha	
26 September	"I'm Good (Blue)"	David Guetta and Bebe Rexha	
3 October	"Unholy"	Sam Smith and Kim Petras	
10 October	"Unholy"	Sam Smith and Kim Petras	
17 October	"Unholy"	Sam Smith and Kim Petras	
24 October	"Unholy"	Sam Smith and Kim Petras	
31 October	"Anti-Hero"	Taylor Swift	
7 November	"Anti-Hero"	Taylor Swift	
14 November	"Anti-Hero"	Taylor Swift	
21 November	"Anti-Hero"	Taylor Swift	
28 November	"Anti-Hero"	Taylor Swift	
5 December	"Anti-Hero"	Taylor Swift	
12 December	"Unholy"	Sam Smith and Kim Petras	
19 December	"All I Want for Christmas Is You"	Mariah Carey	
26 December	"All I Want for Christmas Is You"	Mariah Carey	

== Number-one artists ==
List of number-one artists, with total weeks spent at number one shown
Position	Artist	Weeks at No. 1
1	Kate Bush	9
2	Harry Styles	8
3	Elton John	6
3	Taylor Swift	6
4	Dua Lipa	5
4	Glass Animals	5
4	Sam Smith	5
4	Kim Petras	5
5	The Kid Laroi	3
5	Justin Bieber	3
5	Mariah Carey	3
6	Jack Harlow	2
6	David Guetta	2
6	Bebe Rexha	2
7	Joji	1
7	Blackpink	1
7	Britney Spears	1
7	Nicki Minaj	1

== See also ==
- 2022 in music
- List of number-one albums of 2022 (Australia)
