= List of artists with the most UK singles chart number ones =

The UK singles chart is a weekly record chart which for most of its history was based on single sales from Sunday to Saturday in the United Kingdom. The chart was founded in 1952 by Percy Dickins of New Musical Express (NME), who telephoned 20 record stores to ask what their top 10 highest-selling singles were. Dickins aggregated the results into a top 12 hit parade. NME's chart was published each week in its eponymous magazine. From 2003, music downloads became included in the chart, and rules were altered in 2006 so that singles could chart before physical formats were released. Since July 2014, it has incorporated music streaming service data, with music video views counted towards the chart from July 2018. From 10 July 2015, the chart has been based on a Friday to Thursday week.

This list shows the twenty artists with the most number ones on the UK singles chart. American singer-actor Elvis Presley has most number one singles with twenty-one. English band The Beatles have the most number one singles for a band, with eighteen. American singer Madonna has the most number ones for a female solo artist with thirteen. English girl group the Spice Girls have the most number one singles for a girl group with nine.

== Tally ==
Artists with the most number one singles in the UK singles chart
Number ones	Artist	Number one singles	First year reached number one	Ref.
21	Elvis Presley	"All Shook Up"	1957	
21	Elvis Presley	"Jailhouse Rock"	1958	
21	Elvis Presley	"One Night" / "I Got Stung"	1959	
21	Elvis Presley	"A Fool Such as I" / "I Need Your Love Tonight"	1959	
21	Elvis Presley	"It's Now or Never"	1960	
21	Elvis Presley	"Are You Lonesome Tonight?"	1960	
21	Elvis Presley	"Wooden Heart"	1961	
21	Elvis Presley	"Surrender"	1961	
21	Elvis Presley	"(Marie's the Name) His Latest Flame" / "Little Sister"	1961	
21	Elvis Presley	"Can't Help Falling in Love" / "Rock-A-Hula Baby"	1962	
21	Elvis Presley	"Good Luck Charm"	1962	
21	Elvis Presley	"She's Not You"	1962	
21	Elvis Presley	"Return to Sender"	1962	
21	Elvis Presley	"(You're the) Devil in Disguise"	1963	
21	Elvis Presley	"Crying in the Chapel"	1965	
21	Elvis Presley	"The Wonder of You"	1970	
21	Elvis Presley	"Way Down"	1977	
21	Elvis Presley	"A Little Less Conversation" (Note: Credited to Elvis vs JXL.)	2002	
21	Elvis Presley	"Jailhouse Rock" (Note: Re-issue.)	2005	
21	Elvis Presley	"One Night" / "I Got Stung" (Note: Re-issue.)	2005	
21	Elvis Presley	"It's Now or Never" (Note: Re-issue)	2005	
18	The Beatles	"From Me to You"	1963	
18	The Beatles	"She Loves You"	1963	
18	The Beatles	"I Want to Hold Your Hand"	1963	
18	The Beatles	"Can't Buy Me Love"	1964	
18	The Beatles	"A Hard Day's Night"	1964	
18	The Beatles	"I Feel Fine"	1964	
18	The Beatles	"Ticket to Ride"	1965	
18	The Beatles	"Help!"	1965	
18	The Beatles	"Day Tripper" / "We Can Work It Out"	1965	
18	The Beatles	"Paperback Writer"	1966	
18	The Beatles	"Yellow Submarine" / "Eleanor Rigby"	1966	
18	The Beatles	"All You Need Is Love"	1967	
18	The Beatles	"Hello, Goodbye"	1967	
18	The Beatles	"Lady Madonna"	1968	
18	The Beatles	"Hey Jude"	1968	
18	The Beatles	"Get Back" (Note: Credited to The Beatles with Billy Preston.)	1969	
18	The Beatles	"The Ballad of John and Yoko"	1969	
18	The Beatles	"Now and Then"	2023	
14	Cliff Richard	"Living Doll"	1959	
14	Cliff Richard	"Travellin' Light"	1959	
14	Cliff Richard	"Please Don't Tease"	1960	
14	Cliff Richard	"I Love You"	1960	
14	Cliff Richard	"The Young Ones"	1962	
14	Cliff Richard	"The Next Time" / "Bachelor Boy" (Note: For its first week at number one, the single was credited as "The Next Time". For the other two weeks, it was credited as a double A-side single – "The Next Time" / "Bachelor Boy".)	1962	
14	Cliff Richard	"Summer Holiday"	1963	
14	Cliff Richard	"The Minute You're Gone"	1965	
14	Cliff Richard	"Congratulations"	1968	
14	Cliff Richard	"We Don't Talk Anymore"	1979	
14	Cliff Richard	"Living Doll" (Note: Credited to Richard and the Young Ones featuring Hank Marvin.)	1986	
14	Cliff Richard	"Mistletoe and Wine"	1988	
14	Cliff Richard	"Saviour's Day"	1990	
14	Cliff Richard	"The Millennium Prayer"	1999	
14	Ed Sheeran	"Sing"	2014	
14	Ed Sheeran	"Thinking Out Loud"	2014	
14	Ed Sheeran	"Shape of You"	2017	
14	Ed Sheeran	"Perfect"	2017	
14	Ed Sheeran	"River" (Note: Credited to Eminem featuring Ed Sheeran.)	2018	
14	Ed Sheeran	"I Don't Care" (Note: Credited to Ed Sheeran and Justin Bieber.)	2019	
14	Ed Sheeran	"Beautiful People" (Note: Credited to Ed Sheeran featuring Khalid.)	2019	
14	Ed Sheeran	"Take Me Back to London" (Note: Credited to Ed Sheeran featuring Stormzy.)	2019	
14	Ed Sheeran	"Own It" (Note: Credited to Stormzy featuring Ed Sheeran and Burna Boy.)	2020	
14	Ed Sheeran	"Bad Habits"	2021	
14	Ed Sheeran	"Shivers"	2021	
14	Ed Sheeran	"Merry Christmas" (Note: Credited to Ed Sheeran and Elton John.)	2021	
14	Ed Sheeran	"Sausage Rolls for Everyone" (Note: Credited to LadBaby featuring Ed Sheeran and Elton John.)	2021	
14	Ed Sheeran	"Eyes Closed"	2023	
14	Westlife	"Swear It Again"	1999	
14	Westlife	"If I Let You Go"	1999	
14	Westlife	"Flying Without Wings"	1999	
14	Westlife	"I Have a Dream" / "Seasons in the Sun"	1999	
14	Westlife	"Fool Again"	2000	
14	Westlife	"Against All Odds" (Note: Credited to Mariah Carey featuring Westlife.)	2000	
14	Westlife	"My Love"	2000	
14	Westlife	"Uptown Girl"	2001	
14	Westlife	"Queen of My Heart"	2001	
14	Westlife	"World of Our Own"	2002	
14	Westlife	"Unbreakable"	2002	
14	Westlife	"Mandy"	2003	
14	Westlife	"You Raise Me Up"	2005	
14	Westlife	"The Rose"	2006	
13	Madonna	"Into the Groove"	1985	
13	Madonna	"Papa Don't Preach"	1986	
13	Madonna	"True Blue"	1986	
13	Madonna	"La Isla Bonita"	1987	
13	Madonna	"Who's That Girl"	1987	
13	Madonna	"Like a Prayer"	1989	
13	Madonna	"Vogue"	1990	
13	Madonna	"Frozen"	1998	
13	Madonna	"American Pie"	2000	
13	Madonna	"Music"	2000	
13	Madonna	"Hung Up"	2005	
13	Madonna	"Sorry"	2006	
13	Madonna	"4 Minutes" (Note: Credited to Madonna featuring Justin Timberlake.)	2008	
12	Take That	"Pray"	1993	
12	Take That	"Relight My Fire" (Note: Credited to Take That featuring Lulu.)	1993	
12	Take That	"Babe"	1993	
12	Take That	"Everything Changes"	1994	
12	Take That	"Sure"	1994	
12	Take That	"Back for Good"	1995	
12	Take That	"Never Forget"	1995	
12	Take That	"How Deep Is Your Love"	1996	
12	Take That	"Patience"	2006	
12	Take That	"Shine"	2007	
12	Take That	"Greatest Day"	2008	
12	Take That	"These Days"	2014	
11	Eminem	"The Real Slim Shady"	2000	
11	Eminem	"Stan"	2000	
11	Eminem	"Without Me"	2002	
11	Eminem	"Lose Yourself"	2002	
11	Eminem	"Just Lose It"	2004	
11	Eminem	"Like Toy Soldiers"	2005	
11	Eminem	"Smack That" (Note: Credited to Akon featuring Eminem.)	2006	
11	Eminem	"The Monster" (Note: Credited to Eminem featuring Rihanna.)	2013	
11	Eminem	"River" (Note: Credited to Eminem featuring Ed Sheeran.)	2018	
11	Eminem	"Godzilla" (Note: Credited to Eminem featuring Juice Wrld.)	2020	
11	Eminem	"Houdini"	2024	
11	Calvin Harris	"Dance wiv Me" (Note: Credited to Dizzee Rascal featuring Calvin Harris and Chrome.)	2008	
11	Calvin Harris	"I'm Not Alone"	2009	
11	Calvin Harris	"We Found Love" (Note: Credited to Rihanna featuring Calvin Harris.)	2011	
11	Calvin Harris	"Sweet Nothing" (Note: Credited to Calvin Harris featuring Florence Welch.)	2012	
11	Calvin Harris	"Under Control" (Note: Credited to Calvin Harris and Alesso featuring Hurts.)	2013	
11	Calvin Harris	"Summer"	2014	
11	Calvin Harris	"Blame" (Note: Credited to Calvin Harris featuring John Newman.)	2014	
11	Calvin Harris	"Feels" (Note: Credited to Calvin Harris featuring Pharrell Williams, Katy Perry and Big Sean.)	2017	
11	Calvin Harris	"One Kiss" (Note: Credited to Calvin Harris and Dua Lipa.)	2018	
11	Calvin Harris	"Promises" (Note: Credited to Calvin Harris and Sam Smith.)	2018	
11	Calvin Harris	"Miracle" (Note: Credited to Calvin Harris and Ellie Goulding.)	2023	
10	Elton John	"Don't Go Breaking My Heart" (Note: Credited to Elton John and Kiki Dee)	1976	
10	Elton John	"Sacrifice" / "Healing Hands"	1990	
10	Elton John	"Don't Let the Sun Go Down on Me" (Note: Credited to George Michael and Elton John.)	1991	
10	Elton John	"Something About the Way You Look Tonight" / "Candle in the Wind 1997"	1997	
10	Elton John	"Sorry Seems to Be the Hardest Word" (Note: Credited to Blue featuring Elton John.)	2002	
10	Elton John	"Are You Ready for Love"	2003	
10	Elton John	"Ghetto Gospel" (Note: Credited to 2Pac featuring Elton John.)	2005	
10	Elton John	"Cold Heart (Pnau remix)" (Note: Credited to Elton John and Dua Lipa.)	2021	
10	Elton John	"Merry Christmas" (Note: Credited to Ed Sheeran and Elton John.)	2021	
10	Elton John	"Sausage Rolls for Everyone" (Note: Credited to LadBaby featuring Ed Sheeran and Elton John.)	2021	
9	ABBA	"Waterloo"	1974	
9	ABBA	"Mamma Mia"	1976	
9	ABBA	"Fernando"	1976	
9	ABBA	"Dancing Queen"	1976	
9	ABBA	"Knowing Me, Knowing You"	1977	
9	ABBA	"The Name of the Game"	1977	
9	ABBA	"Take a Chance on Me"	1978	
9	ABBA	"The Winner Takes It All"	1980	
9	ABBA	"Super Trouper"	1980	
9	Rihanna	"Umbrella" (Note: Credited to Rihanna featuring Jay-Z.)	2007	
9	Rihanna	"Take a Bow"	2008	
9	Rihanna	"Run This Town" (Note: Credited to Jay-Z featuring Rihanna and Kanye West.)	2009	
9	Rihanna	"Only Girl (In the World)"	2010	
9	Rihanna	"What's My Name?" (Note: Credited to Rihanna featuring Drake.)	2011	
9	Rihanna	"We Found Love" (Note: Credited to Rihanna featuring Calvin Harris.)	2011	
9	Rihanna	"Diamonds"	2012	
9	Rihanna	"The Monster" (Note: Credited to Eminem featuring Rihanna.)	2013	
9	Rihanna	"Wild Thoughts" (Note: Credited to DJ Khaled featuring Rihanna and Bryson Tiller.)	2017	
9	Spice Girls	"Wannabe"	1996	
9	Spice Girls	"Say You'll Be There"	1996	
9	Spice Girls	"2 Become 1"	1996	
9	Spice Girls	"Mama" / "Who Do You Think You Are"	1997	
9	Spice Girls	"Spice Up Your Life"	1997	
9	Spice Girls	"Too Much"	1997	
9	Spice Girls	"Viva Forever"	1998	
9	Spice Girls	"Goodbye"	1998	
9	Spice Girls	"Holler" / "Let Love Lead the Way"	2000	
8	Justin Bieber	"What Do You Mean?"	2015	
8	Justin Bieber	"Sorry"	2015	
8	Justin Bieber	"Love Yourself"	2015	
8	Justin Bieber	"Cold Water" (Note: Credited to Major Lazer featuring Justin Bieber and MØ.)	2016	
8	Justin Bieber	"I'm the One" (Note: Credited to DJ Khaled featuring Justin Bieber, Quavo, Chance the Rapper and Lil Wayne.)	2017	
8	Justin Bieber	"Despacito" (Note: Credited to Luis Fonsi and Daddy Yankee featuring Justin Bieber.)	2017	
8	Justin Bieber	"I Don't Care" (Note: Credited to Ed Sheeran and Justin Bieber.)	2019	
8	Justin Bieber	"Daisies"	2025	
8	Ariana Grande	"Problem" (Note: Credited to Ariana Grande featuring Iggy Azalea.)	2014	
8	Ariana Grande	"Bang Bang" (Note: Credited to Jessie J, Ariana Grande and Nicki Minaj.)	2014	
8	Ariana Grande	"Thank U, Next"	2018	
8	Ariana Grande	"7 Rings"	2019	
8	Ariana Grande	"Break Up with Your Girlfriend, I'm Bored"	2019	
8	Ariana Grande	"Rain on Me" (Note: Credited to Lady Gaga and Ariana Grande.)	2020	
8	Ariana Grande	"Positions"	2020	
8	Ariana Grande	"Hate That I Made You Love Me"	2026	
8	Kylie Minogue	"I Should Be So Lucky"	1988	
8	Kylie Minogue	"Especially for You" (Note: Credited to Kylie Minogue and Jason Donovan.)	1989	
8	Kylie Minogue	"Hand on Your Heart"	1989	
8	Kylie Minogue	"Tears on My Pillow"	1990	
8	Kylie Minogue	"Spinning Around"	2000	
8	Kylie Minogue	"Can't Get You Out of My Head"	2001	
8	Kylie Minogue	"Slow"	2003	
8	Kylie Minogue	"XMAS"	2025	
8	Oasis	"Some Might Say"	1995	
8	Oasis	"Don't Look Back in Anger"	1996	
8	Oasis	"D'You Know What I Mean?"	1997	
8	Oasis	"All Around the World"	1998	
8	Oasis	"Go Let It Out"	2000	
8	Oasis	"The Hindu Times"	2002	
8	Oasis	"Lyla"	2005	
8	Oasis	"The Importance of Being Idle"	2005	
8	The Rolling Stones	"It's All Over Now"	1964	
8	The Rolling Stones	"Little Red Rooster"	1964	
8	The Rolling Stones	"The Last Time"	1965	
8	The Rolling Stones	"(I Can't Get No) Satisfaction"	1965	
8	The Rolling Stones	"Get Off of My Cloud"	1965	
8	The Rolling Stones	"Paint It Black"	1966	
8	The Rolling Stones	"Jumpin' Jack Flash	1968	
8	The Rolling Stones	"Honky Tonk Women"	1969	
8	Sam Smith	"La La La" (Note: Credited to Naughty Boy featuring Sam Smith.)	2013	
8	Sam Smith	"Money on My Mind"	2014	
8	Sam Smith	"Stay with Me"	2014	
8	Sam Smith	"Lay Me Down" (Note: Credited to Sam Smith featuring John Legend.)	2015	
8	Sam Smith	"Writing's on the Wall"	2015	
8	Sam Smith	"Too Good at Goodbyes"	2017	
8	Sam Smith	"Promises" (Note: Credited to Calvin Harris and Sam Smith.)	2018	
8	Sam Smith	"Unholy" (Note: Credited to Sam Smith and Kim Petras.)	2022	
8	Taylor Swift	"Look What You Made Me Do"	2017	
8	Taylor Swift	"Anti-Hero"	2022	
8	Taylor Swift	"Is It Over Now?"	2023	
8	Taylor Swift	"Fortnight"	2024	
8	Taylor Swift	"The Fate of Ophelia"	2025	
8	Taylor Swift	"Opalite"	2026	
8	Taylor Swift	"I Knew It, I Knew You"	2026	
8	Taylor Swift	"Patient Zero"	2026	
