= List of UK singles chart number ones of the 2020s =

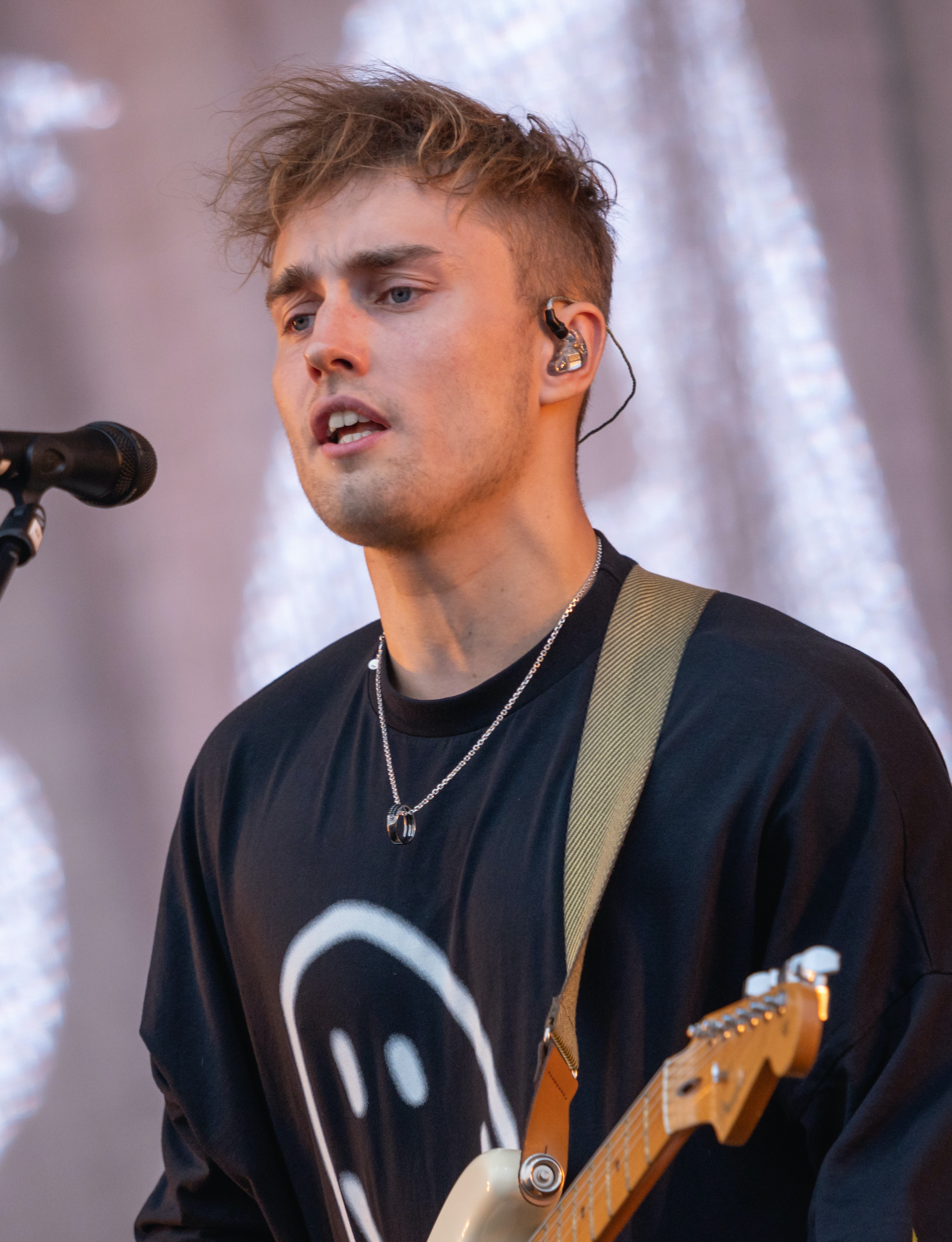
Sam Fender is the longest-running number one single of all time in July 2026 with "Rein Me In", which spent 23 non-consecutive weeks at the top of the charts.

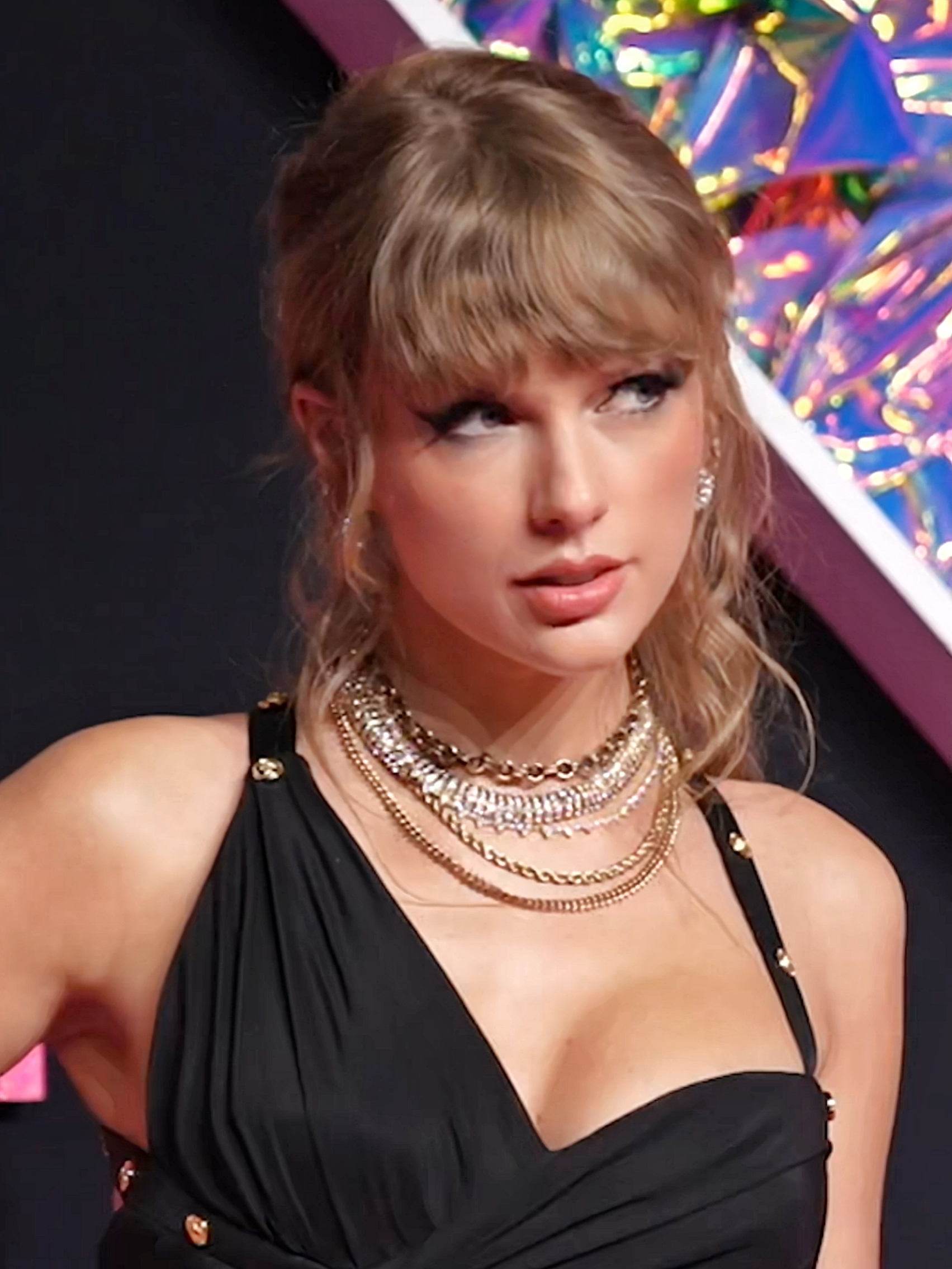
Taylor Swift earned five number-one singles in the 2020s, of which "Anti-Hero", "Is It Over Now?", "Fortnight", "The Fate of Ophelia" and "Patient Zero" all achieved the prestigious Chart Double with the song's parent album simultaneously topping the UK Album Chart. Swift also became the artist to achieve the most number-ones in the 2020s, so far.

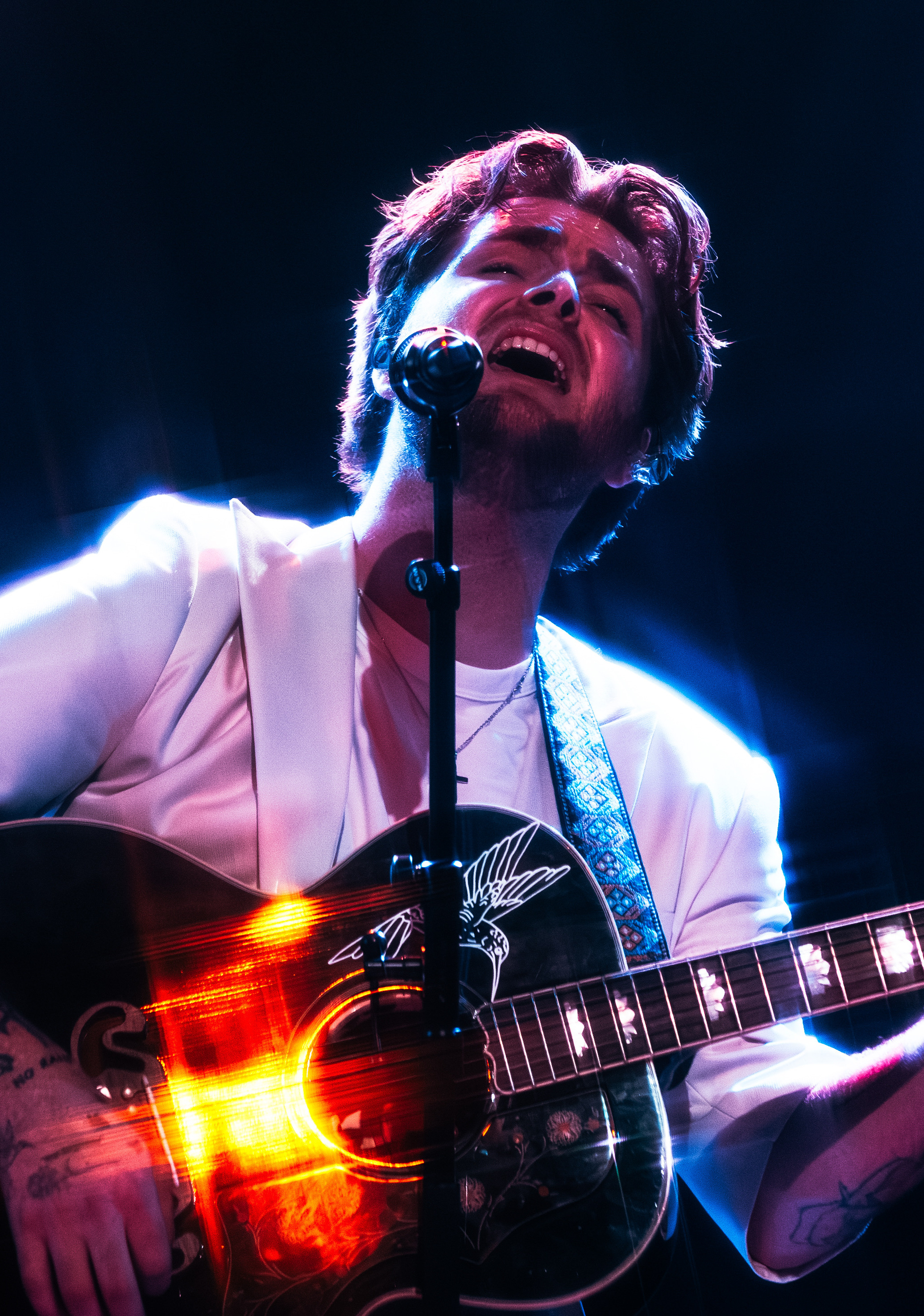
Alex Warren earned the longest reigning consecutive number-one single of the decade so far in 2025 with "Ordinary", which topped the charts for twelve consecutive weeks. The song also became the longest-running uninterrupted UK number-one ever by a US male solo artist.

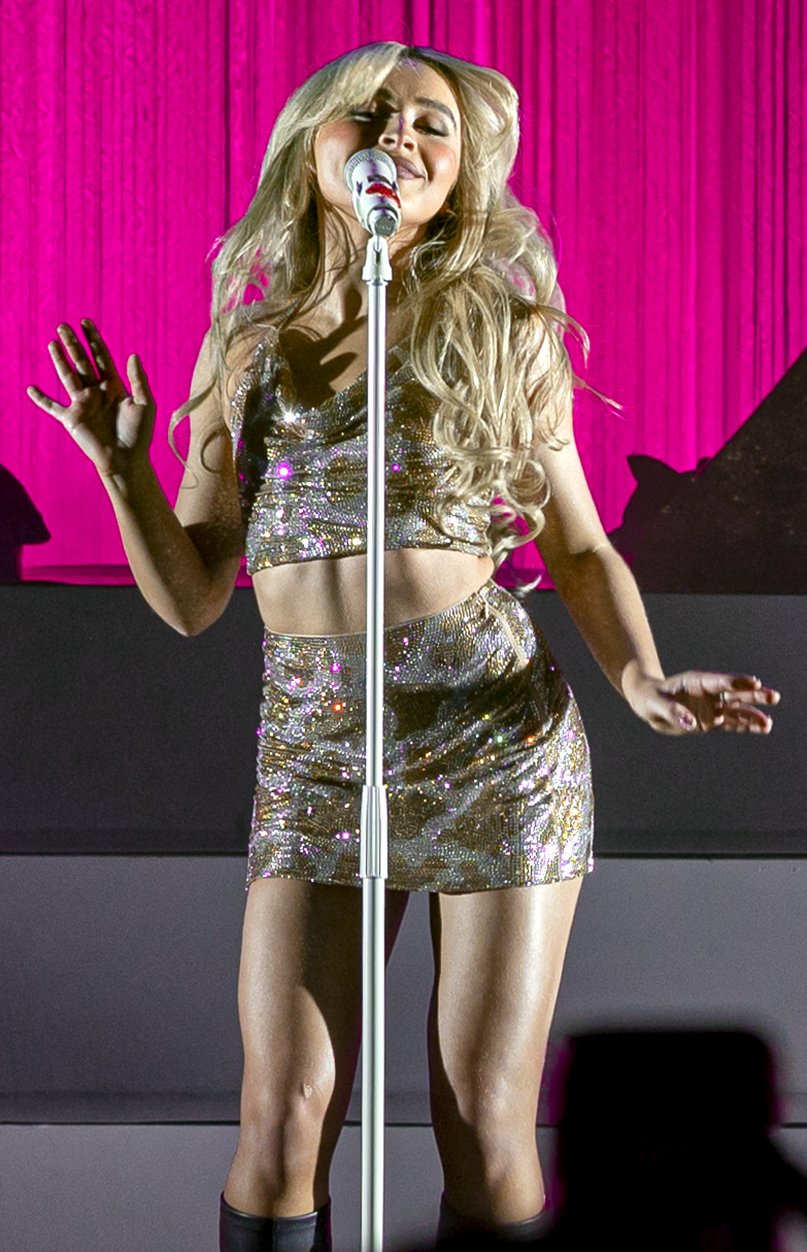
Sabrina Carpenter earned three number-one singles in 2024 with "Espresso", "Please Please Please" and "Taste", totalling 21 weeks at number one, the most weeks at number one for a female artist in a calendar year.

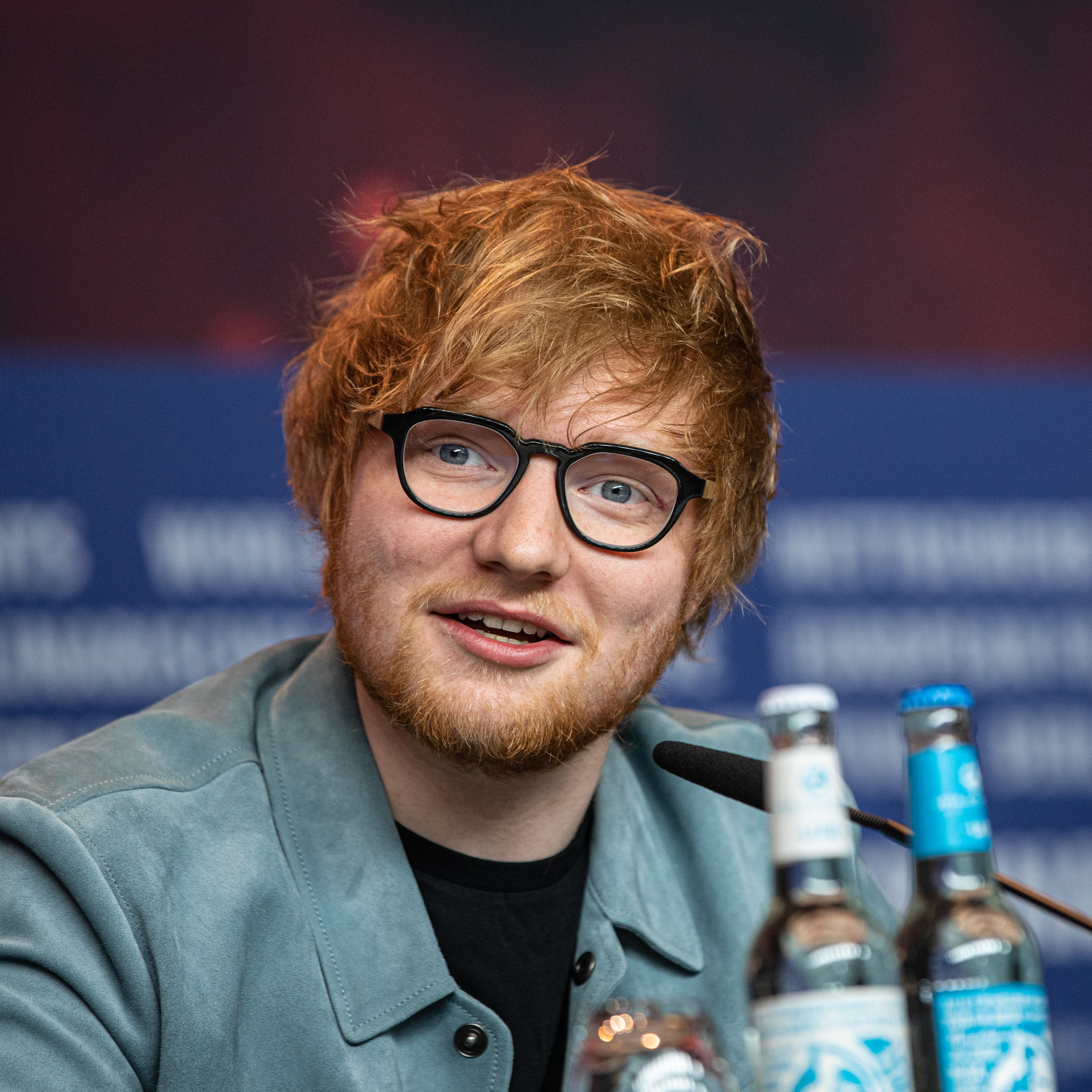
Ed Sheeran replaced his own number one single twice with "Bad Habits" in July 2021 by "Shivers" in September 2021 and "Merry Christmas" in December 2021 by "Sausage Rolls for Everyone" in the same month.

The UK singles chart is a weekly record chart compiled by the Official Charts Company (OCC) on behalf of the British record industry. The chart week runs from Friday to Thursday, with the chart date given as the following Thursday.

Audio streaming data was incorporated into the chart in 2014, with 100 streams equivalent to one sale. In 2017, the OCC introduced an exception for songs that had spent a certain time on the charts and whose consumption had declined, whereby these songs are calculated at a rate of 300 streams equivalent to a sale. Ellie Goulding was the first artist to top the chart in the decade with her cover of Joni Mitchell's song "River".

The following singles have all been number one in the United Kingdom during the 2020s:

== Number-one singles ==
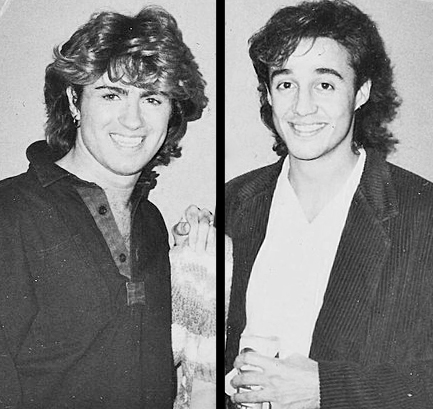
Wham! had the first 2021 number-one single with "Last Christmas", 36 years after its original release. The song returned to number-one in December 2022, January 2023, and most significantly as the 2023 and 2024 Christmas number-one.

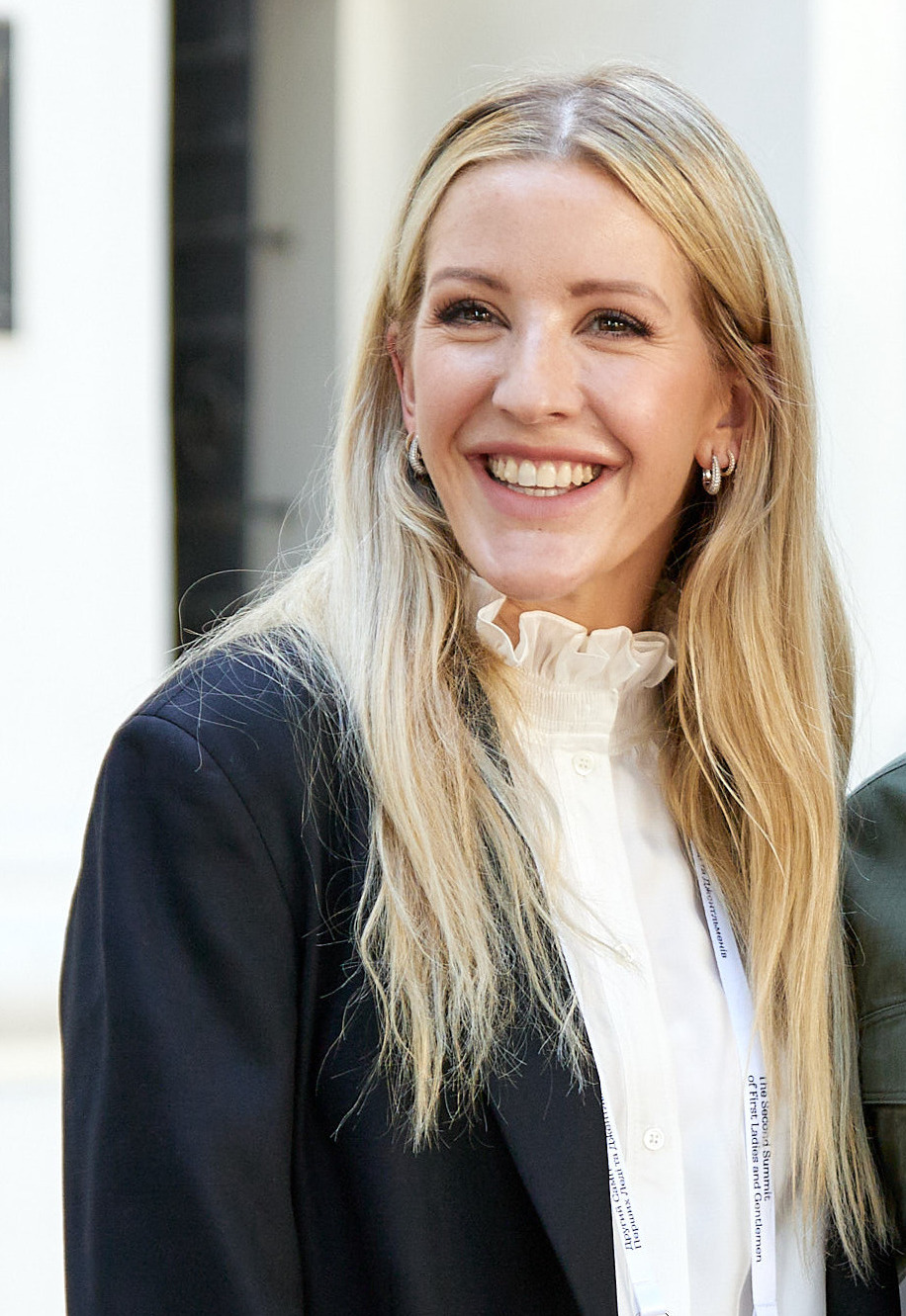
Ellie Goulding had the first number-one single of the decade with "River", a cover of the 1971 song by Joni Mitchell. She topped the charts again in April 2023 with "Miracle", her fourth overall.

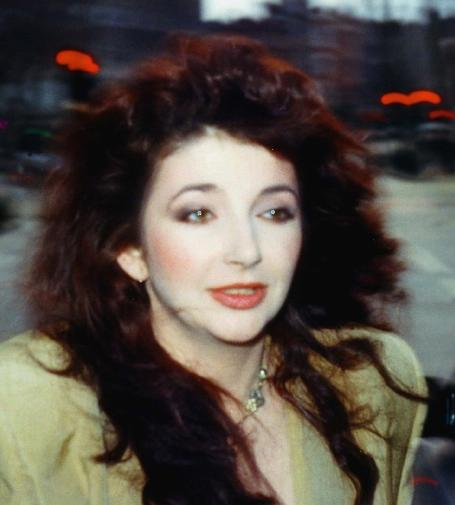
Kate Bush broke three chart-topping records in June 2022 with "Running Up That Hill". The song holds the longest gap between two of an artist's number one singles, the previous 44 years earlier with "Wuthering Heights" in 1978). It also holds the record for the longest time for a song to reach number one after its initial release and the oldest female artist to have a number one single.

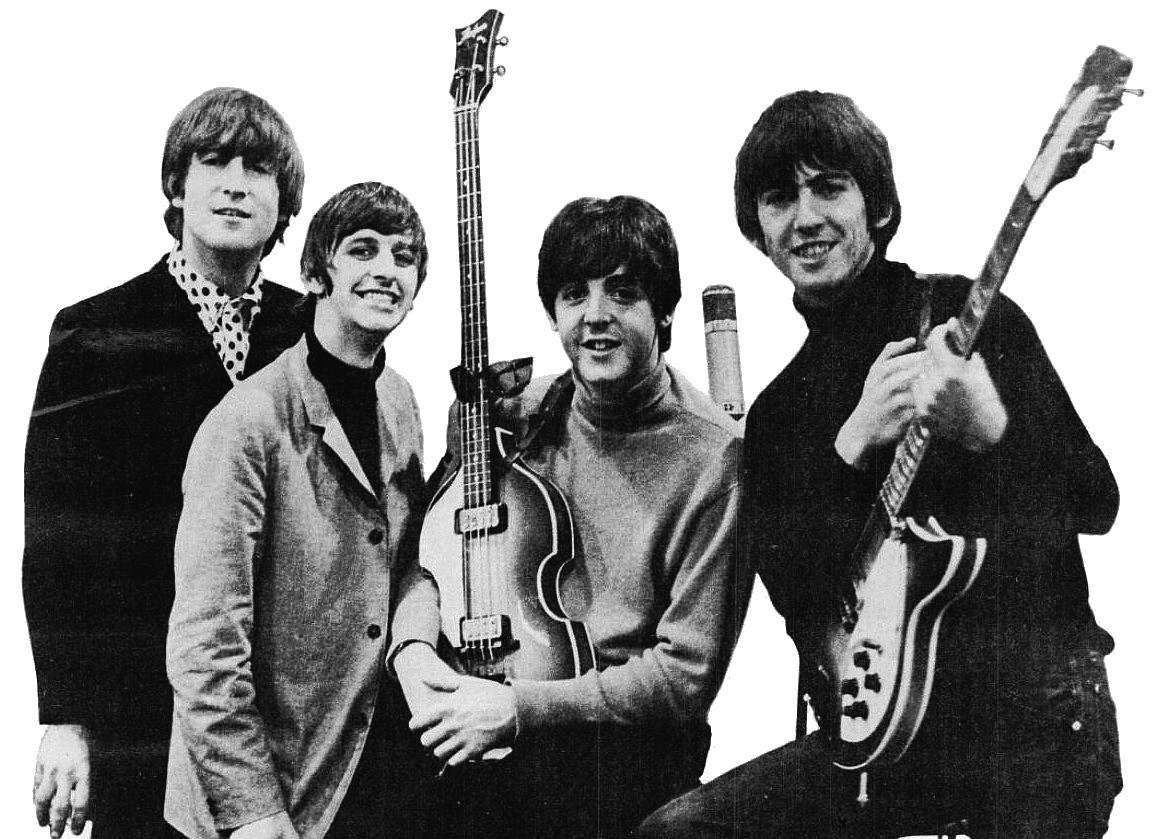
The Beatles had their 18th number-one single with "Now and Then" in November 2023, making it the longest gap (60 years) between an artist's first and last number one in UK chart history.

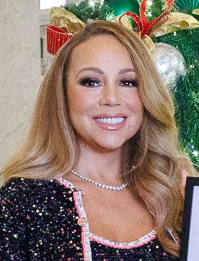
Mariah Carey earned her third number-one single with "All I Want for Christmas Is You", which topped the UK charts in its 70th week in the top 40 in December 2020, 26 years after the song's original release. The song returned to number one in December 2022.

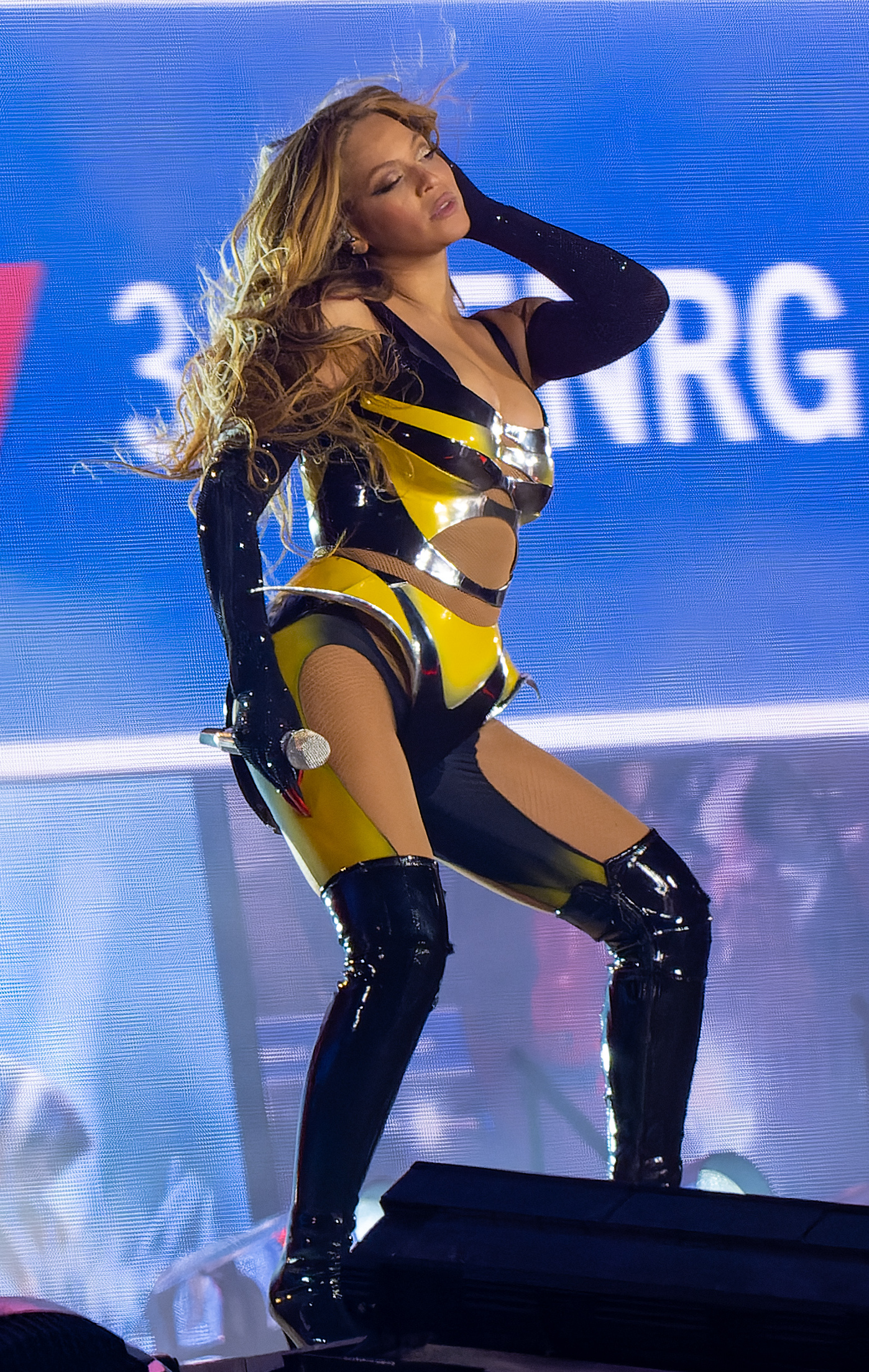
In 2024, Beyoncé became the first female artist to earn a number one country single with "Texas Hold 'Em", which spent five weeks at the top of the charts.

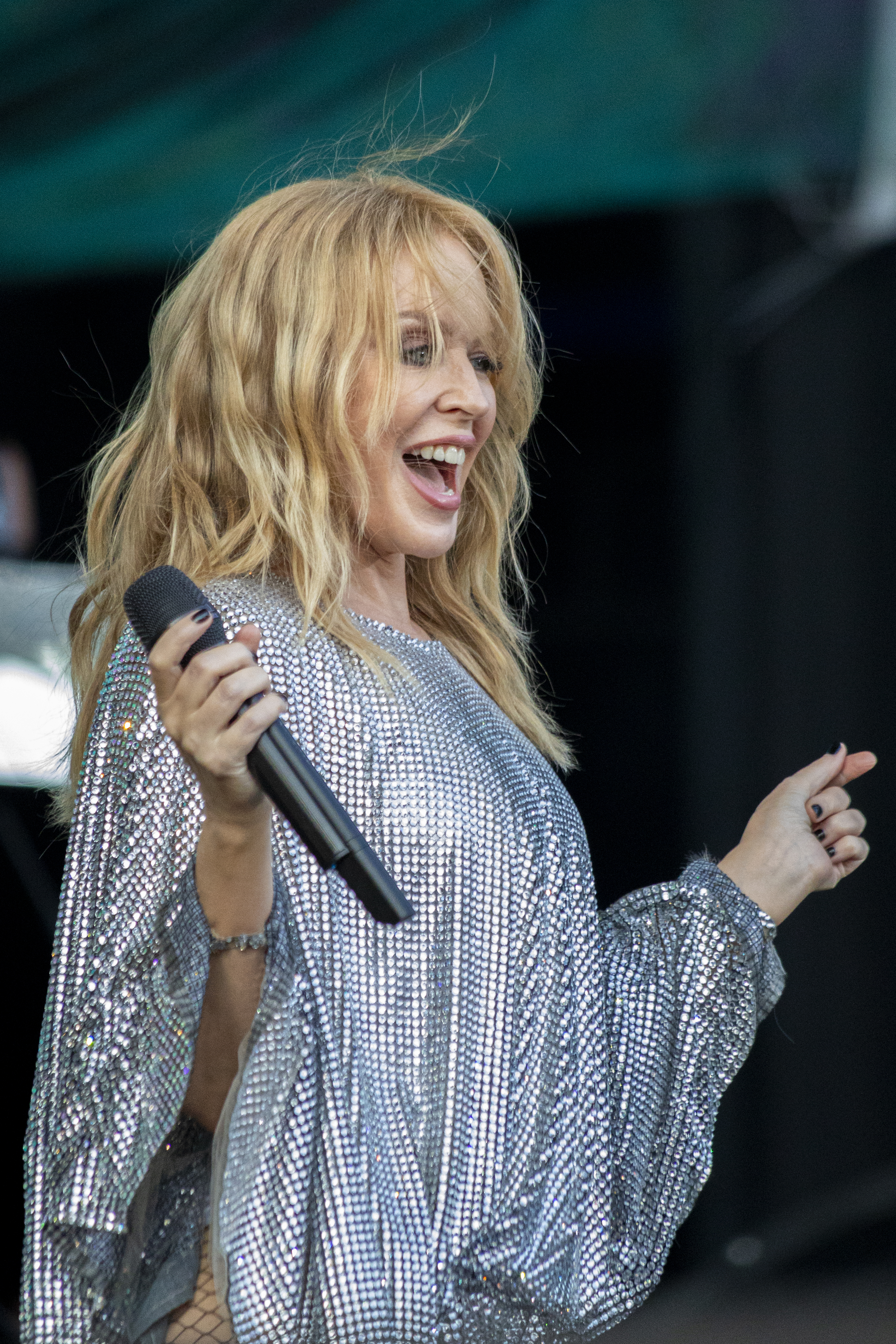
Kylie Minogue earned the Christmas number-one single of 2025 with "XMAS". Minogue also became the first female artist to achieve a number-one single across four different decades, the 1980s, 1990s, 2000s and 2020s.

Key
| No. | nth single to top the UK singles chart |
| re | Return of a single to number one |
| † | Best-selling single of the year |

| No. | Artist (Note: The artist, single, date of reaching number one and number of weeks at number one are those given by the Official Charts Company.) | Single | Record label (Note: The record labels are those given by the OCC.) | Week ending date | Weeks at number one |
2020
| 1361 | Ellie Goulding | "River" | Polydor | 2 January 2020 | 1 |
| 1362 | Stormzy featuring Ed Sheeran and Burna Boy | "Own It" | Atlantic/Merky | 9 January 2020 | 3 |
| 1363 | Eminem featuring Juice Wrld | "Godzilla" | Interscope | 30 January 2020 | 1 |
| 1364 | Lewis Capaldi | "Before You Go" | EMI | 6 February 2020 | 1 |
| 1365 | The Weeknd | "Blinding Lights" † | Republic | 13 February 2020 | 2 |
| 1366 | Billie Eilish | "No Time to Die" | Interscope | 27 February 2020 | 1 |
| re | The Weeknd | "Blinding Lights" † | Republic | 5 March 2020 | 3 |
| 1367 | Saint Jhn | "Roses" | B1/Hitco/Ministry of Sound | 26 March 2020 | 2 |
| re | The Weeknd | "Blinding Lights" † | Republic | 9 April 2020 | 3 |
| 1368 | Michael Ball, Captain Tom Moore and the NHS Voices of Care Choir | "You'll Never Walk Alone" | Decca | 30 April 2020 | 1 |
| 1369 | BBC Radio 1's Live Lounge Allstars | "Times Like These" | BBC/Columbia | 7 May 2020 | 1 |
| 1370 | Drake | "Toosie Slide" | Republic/OVO | 14 May 2020 | 1 |
| 1371 | DaBaby featuring Roddy Ricch | "Rockstar" | Interscope | 21 May 2020 | 2 |
| 1372 | Lady Gaga and Ariana Grande | "Rain on Me" | Interscope | 4 June 2020 | 1 |
| re | DaBaby featuring Roddy Ricch | "Rockstar" | Interscope | 11 June 2020 | 4 |
| 1373 | Jawsh 685 and Jason Derulo | "Savage Love (Laxed – Siren Beat)" | Columbia | 9 July 2020 | 3 |
| 1374 | Joel Corry and MNEK | "Head & Heart" | Asylum/Perfect Havoc | 30 July 2020 | 6 |
| 1375 | Cardi B featuring Megan Thee Stallion | "WAP" | Atlantic | 10 September 2020 | 3 |
| 1376 | 24kGoldn featuring Iann Dior | "Mood" | Columbia | 1 October 2020 | 4 |
| 1377 | Internet Money featuring Gunna, Don Toliver and Nav | "Lemonade" | Internet Money/TenThousand | 29 October 2020 | 1 |
| 1378 | Ariana Grande | "Positions" | Republic | 5 November 2020 | 6 |
| 1379 | Mariah Carey | "All I Want for Christmas Is You" | Columbia | 17 December 2020 | 2 |
| 1380 | LadBaby | "Don't Stop Me Eatin'" | Frtyfve | 31 December 2020 | 1 |
2021
| 1381 | Wham! | "Last Christmas" | RCA | 7 January 2021 | 1 |
| 1382 | Little Mix | "Sweet Melody" | RCA | 14 January 2021 | 1 |
| 1383 | Olivia Rodrigo | "Drivers License" | Interscope | 21 January 2021 | 9 |
| 1384 | Nathan Evans, 220 Kid and Billen Ted | "Wellerman" | Polydor | 25 March 2021 | 2 |
| 1385 | Lil Nas X | "Montero (Call Me by Your Name)" | Columbia | 8 April 2021 | 5 |
| 1386 | Tion Wayne and Russ Millions | "Body" | Atlantic | 13 May 2021 | 3 |
| 1387 | Olivia Rodrigo | "Good 4 U" | Geffen | 3 June 2021 | 5 |
| 1388 | Ed Sheeran | "Bad Habits" † | Asylum | 8 July 2021 | 11 |
| 1389 | Ed Sheeran | "Shivers" | Asylum | 23 September 2021 | 4 |
| 1390 | Elton John and Dua Lipa | "Cold Heart (Pnau remix)" | EMI | 21 October 2021 | 1 |
| 1391 | Adele | "Easy on Me" | Columbia | 28 October 2021 | 7 |
| 1392 | Ed Sheeran and Elton John | "Merry Christmas" | Atlantic | 16 December 2021 | 2 |
| 1393 | LadBaby featuring Ed Sheeran and Elton John | "Sausage Rolls for Everyone" | Frtyfve | 30 December 2021 | 1 |
2022
| re | Ed Sheeran and Elton John | "Merry Christmas" | Atlantic | 6 January 2022 | 1 |
| re | Adele | "Easy on Me" | Columbia | 13 January 2022 | 1 |
| 1394 | Gayle | "ABCDEFU" | Atlantic | 20 January 2022 | 1 |
| 1395 | Carolina Gaitán, Mauro Castillo, Adassa, Rhenzy Feliz, Diane Guerrero and Stephanie Beatriz | "We Don't Talk About Bruno" | Walt Disney | 27 January 2022 | 7 |
| 1396 | Dave | "Starlight" | Dave/Neighbourhood | 17 March 2022 | 4 |
| 1397 | Harry Styles | "As It Was" † | Columbia | 14 April 2022 | 10 |
| 1398 | Kate Bush | "Running Up That Hill" | Fish People (Note: This was originally issued as a single by EMI Records, the majority of whose catalogue was purchased along with Virgin Records by Universal Music Group (UMG). However, UMG did not purchase the catalogue of Kate Bush as the licence for her work was part of the Parlophone-deal arranged with Warner Music (WMG). Fish People is Kate Bush's record label, who also issued a version with a re-recorded vocal in 2012. Rhino, the catalogue division of WMG, held distribution rights only until February 2023, after which she moved distribution of her post-1980 recordings catalogue to the state51 Conspiracy.) | 23 June 2022 | 3 |
| 1399 | LF System | "Afraid to Feel" | Warner Music UK | 14 July 2022 | 8 |
| 1400 | Eliza Rose and Interplanetary Criminal | "B.O.T.A. (Baddest of Them All)" | Rosebud/Warner Music UK (Note: This was originally issued as a single by Rosebud, Eliza Rose's own independent record label and picked up by Warner Music UK a few weeks after charting. After being listed solely under the Warner Music UK banner, the record label credit was changed for a third time to Warner Records X One House during the record's stay in the UK charts.) | 8 September 2022 | 2 |
| 1401 | Lewis Capaldi | "Forget Me" | Vertigo | 22 September 2022 | 1 |
| 1402 | David Guetta and Bebe Rexha | "I'm Good (Blue)" | Warner Music UK | 29 September 2022 | 1 |
| 1403 | Sam Smith and Kim Petras | "Unholy" | EMI | 6 October 2022 | 4 |
| 1404 | Taylor Swift | "Anti-Hero" | EMI | 3 November 2022 | 6 |
| re | Mariah Carey | "All I Want for Christmas Is You" | Columbia | 15 December 2022 | 1 |
| re | Wham! | "Last Christmas" | RCA | 22 December 2022 | 1 |
| 1405 | LadBaby | "Food Aid" | Frtyfve | 29 December 2022 | 1 |
2023
| re | Wham! | "Last Christmas" | RCA | 5 January 2023 | 1 |
| 1406 | Raye featuring 070 Shake | "Escapism" | Human Re Sources | 12 January 2023 | 1 |
| 1407 | Lewis Capaldi | "Pointless" | Vertigo | 19 January 2023 | 1 |
| 1408 | Miley Cyrus | "Flowers" † | Columbia | 26 January 2023 | 10 |
| 1409 | Ed Sheeran | "Eyes Closed" | Asylum | 6 April 2023 | 1 |
| 1410 | Calvin Harris and Ellie Goulding | "Miracle" | Sony | 13 April 2023 | 2 |
| 1411 | Lewis Capaldi | "Wish You the Best" | Vertigo | 27 April 2023 | 1 |
| re | Calvin Harris and Ellie Goulding | "Miracle" | Sony | 4 May 2023 | 6 |
| 1412 | Dave and Central Cee | "Sprinter" | Live Yours/Neighbourhood | 15 June 2023 | 10 |
| 1413 | Billie Eilish | "What Was I Made For?" | Interscope | 24 August 2023 | 1 |
| 1414 | Dua Lipa | "Dance the Night" | Warner | 31 August 2023 | 1 |
| 1415 | Olivia Rodrigo | "Vampire" | Geffen | 7 September 2023 | 1 |
| 1416 | Doja Cat | "Paint the Town Red" | Ministry of Sound | 14 September 2023 | 5 |
| 1417 | Kenya Grace | "Strangers" | Warner | 19 October 2023 | 3 |
| 1418 | Taylor Swift | "Is It Over Now?" | EMI | 9 November 2023 | 1 |
| 1419 | The Beatles | "Now and Then" | Apple | 16 November 2023 | 1 |
| 1420 | Jack Harlow | "Lovin on Me" | Atlantic | 23 November 2023 | 3 |
| re | Wham! | "Last Christmas" | RCA | 14 December 2023 | 4 |
2024
| 1421 | Noah Kahan | "Stick Season" † | Republic | 11 January 2024 | 7 |
| 1422 | Beyoncé | "Texas Hold 'Em" | Columbia/Parkwood | 29 February 2024 | 4 |
| 1423 | Benson Boone | "Beautiful Things" | Night Street/Warner | 28 March 2024 | 2 |
| re | Beyoncé | "Texas Hold 'Em" | Columbia/Parkwood | 11 April 2024 | 1 |
| 1424 | Hozier | "Too Sweet" | Rubyworks/Island/Columbia | 18 April 2024 | 2 |
| 1425 | Taylor Swift featuring Post Malone | "Fortnight" | EMI | 2 May 2024 | 1 |
| 1426 | Sabrina Carpenter | "Espresso" | Island | 9 May 2024 | 5 |
| 1427 | Eminem | "Houdini" | Interscope | 13 June 2024 | 2 |
| 1428 | Sabrina Carpenter | "Please Please Please" | Island | 27 June 2024 | 3 |
| re | Sabrina Carpenter | "Espresso" | Island | 18 July 2024 | 2 |
| re | Sabrina Carpenter | "Please Please Please" | Island | 1 August 2024 | 2 |
| 1429 | Charli XCX featuring Billie Eilish | "Guess" | Atlantic | 15 August 2024 | 1 |
| 1430 | Chase & Status and Stormzy | "Backbone" | EMI | 22 August 2024 | 2 |
| 1431 | Sabrina Carpenter | "Taste" | Island | 5 September 2024 | 9 |
| 1432 | Gigi Perez | "Sailor Song" | Interscope | 7 November 2024 | 1 |
| 1433 | Gracie Abrams | "That's So True" | Interscope | 14 November 2024 | 5 |
| re | Wham! | "Last Christmas" | RCA | 19 December 2024 | 3 |
2025
| re | Gracie Abrams | "That's So True" | Interscope | 9 January 2025 | 3 |
| 1434 | Lola Young | "Messy" | Island | 30 January 2025 | 4 |
| 1435 | Kendrick Lamar | "Not Like Us" | Interscope | 27 February 2025 | 2 |
| 1436 | Chappell Roan | "Pink Pony Club" | Atlantic | 13 March 2025 | 2 |
| 1437 | Alex Warren | "Ordinary" † | Atlantic | 27 March 2025 | 12 |
| 1438 | Sabrina Carpenter | "Manchild" | Island | 19 June 2025 | 1 |
| re | Alex Warren | "Ordinary" † | Atlantic | 26 June 2025 | 1 |
| re | Sabrina Carpenter | "Manchild" | Island | 3 July 2025 | 1 |
| 1439 | Lewis Capaldi | "Survive" | Polydor | 10 July 2025 | 1 |
| 1440 | MK featuring Chrystal | "Dior" | Sony UK | 17 July 2025 | 2 |
| 1441 | Justin Bieber | "Daisies" | Def Jam | 31 July 2025 | 1 |
| 1442 | Huntrix/Ejae/Audrey Nuna/Rei Ami & KPop Demon Hunters Cast | "Golden" | Republic | 7 August 2025 | 1 |
| 1443 | Chappell Roan | "The Subway" | Island | 14 August 2025 | 1 |
| re | Huntrix/Ejae/Audrey Nuna/Rei Ami & KPop Demon Hunters Cast | "Golden" | Republic | 21 August 2025 | 7 |
| 1444 | Olivia Dean | "Man I Need" | Polydor | 9 October 2025 | 1 |
| 1445 | Taylor Swift | "The Fate of Ophelia" | EMI | 16 October 2025 | 3 |
| re | Huntrix/Ejae/Audrey Nuna/Rei Ami & KPop Demon Hunters Cast | "Golden" | Republic | 6 November 2025 | 2 |
| re | Taylor Swift | "The Fate of Ophelia" | EMI | 20 November 2025 | 4 |
| re | Wham! | "Last Christmas" | RCA | 18 December 2025 | 1 |
| 1446 | Kylie Minogue | "XMAS" | Parlophone | 25 December 2025 | 1 |
2026
| re | Wham! | "Last Christmas" | RCA | 1 January 2026 | 1 |
| 1447 | Raye | "Where Is My Husband!" | Human Re Sources | 8 January 2026 | 1 |
| 1448 | Djo | "End of Beginning" | Djo/AWAL | 15 January 2026 | 2 |
| 1449 | Dave and Tems | "Raindance" | Neighbourhood | 29 January 2026 | 1 |
| 1450 | Harry Styles | "Aperture" | Columbia | 5 February 2026 | 1 |
| re | Dave and Tems | "Raindance" | Neighbourhood | 12 February 2026 | 1 |
| 1451 | Taylor Swift | "Opalite" | EMI | 19 February 2026 | 1 |
| 1452 | Sam Fender and Olivia Dean | "Rein Me In" | Polydor | 26 February 2026 | 3 |
| 1453 | Harry Styles | "American Girls" | Columbia | 19 March 2026 | 1 |
| re | Sam Fender and Olivia Dean | "Rein Me In" | Polydor | 26 March 2026 | 5 |
| 1454 | Olivia Rodrigo | "Drop Dead" | Geffen | 30 April 2026 | 1 |
| re | Sam Fender and Olivia Dean | "Rein Me In" | Polydor | 7 May 2026 | 5 |
| 1455 | Ariana Grande | "Hate That I Made You Love Me" | Republic/Babydoll | 11 June 2026 | 1 |
| 1456 | Taylor Swift | "I Knew It, I Knew You" | EMI | 18 June 2026 | 2 |
| re | Sam Fender and Olivia Dean | "Rein Me In" | Polydor | 2 July 2026 | 10 |
| 1457 | Ella Langley | "Choosin' Texas" | Columbia/Sawgod | 10 September 2026 | 1 |
| 1458 | Sienna Spiro | "Great Expectation" | Capitol/Method | 17 September 2026 | 3 |
| 1459 | Taylor Swift | "Patient Zero" | EMI | 8 October 2026 | 3 |
| 1460 | Jamie Miller | "Babydoll" | Republic | 29 October 2026 | 5 |

=== Artists with the most number ones ===
Eleven artists have at least three number-one singles during the decade.

| Artist | Number ones | Songs | Notes |
|---|---|---|---|
| Taylor Swift | 7 | List: 1. "Anti-Hero" (2022); 2. "Is It Over Now?" (2023); 3. "Fortnight" (2024); 4. "The Fate of Ophelia" (2025); 5. "Opalite" (2026); 6. "I Knew It, I Knew You" (2026); 7. "Patient Zero" (2026) | —N/a |
| Ed Sheeran | 6 | List: 1. "Own It" (2020); 2. "Bad Habits" (2021); 3. "Shivers" (2021); 4. "Merry Christmas" (2021); 5. "Sausage Rolls for Everyone" (2021); 6. "Eyes Closed" (2023) | Includes a feature on "Own It" and "Sausage Rolls for Everyone". |
| Lewis Capaldi | 5 | List: 1. "Before You Go" (2020); 2. "Forget Me" (2022); 3. "Pointless" (2023); 4. "Wish You the Best" (2023); 5. "Survive" (2025) | —N/a |
| Sabrina Carpenter | 4 | List: 1. "Espresso" (2024); 2. "Please Please Please" (2024); 3. "Taste" (2024); 4. "Manchild" (2025) | —N/a |
| Olivia Rodrigo | 4 | List: 1. "Drivers License" (2021); 2. "Good 4 U" (2021); 3. "Vampire" (2023); 4. "Drop Dead" (2026) | —N/a |
| Billie Eilish | 3 | List: 1. "No Time To Die" (2020); 2. "What Was I Made For?" (2023); 3. "Guess" (2024) | —N/a |
| LadBaby | 3 | List: 1. "Don't Stop Me Eatin'" (2020); 2. "Sausage Rolls for Everyone" (2021); 3. "Food Aid" (2022) | —N/a |
| Dave | 3 | List: 1. "Starlight" (2022); 2. "Sprinter" (2023); 3. "Raindance" (2026) | —N/a |
| Harry Styles | 3 | List: 1. "As It Was" (2022); 2. "Aperture" (2026); 3. "American Girls" (2026) | —N/a |
| Ariana Grande | 3 | List: 1. "Rain on Me" (2020); 2. "Positions" (2020); 3. "Hate That I Made You Love Me" (2026) | —N/a |
| Elton John | 3 | List: 1. "Cold Heart (Pnau remix)" (2021); 2. "Merry Christmas" (2021); 3. "Sausage Rolls for Everyone" (2021) | Includes a feature on "Sausage Rolls for Everyone". |

=== Songs with the most weeks at number one ===
The following songs spent at least ten successive or non-successive weeks at number one during the 2020s.

| Artist | Song | Weeks at number one |
|---|---|---|
| Sam Fender and Olivia Dean | "Rein Me In" | 23 |
| Alex Warren | "Ordinary" | 13 |
| Wham! | "Last Christmas" | 12 |
| Ed Sheeran | "Bad Habits" | 11 |
| Miley Cyrus | "Flowers" | 10 |
| Harry Styles | "As It Was" | 10 |
| Dave and Central Cee | "Sprinter" | 10 |
| Huntrix/Ejae/Audrey Nuna/Rei Ami & KPop Demon Hunters Cast | "Golden" | 10 |

=== Artists with the most weeks at number one ===
The following artists have all spent a total of ten or more weeks at the number-one spot during the 2020s.

| Artist | Weeks at number one | Songs | Notes |
|---|---|---|---|
| Olivia Dean | 24 | List: 1. "Man I Need" (1 week); 2. "Rein Me In" (23 weeks) | —N/a |
| Ed Sheeran | 23 | List: 1. "Own It" (3 weeks); 2. "Bad Habits" (11 weeks); 3. "Shivers" (4 weeks); 4. "Merry Christmas" (3 weeks); 5. "Sausage Rolls for Everyone" (1 week); 6. "Eyes Closed" (1 week) | Includes features on "Own It" and "Sausage Rolls for Everyone". |
| Sabrina Carpenter | 23 | List: 1. "Espresso" (7 weeks); 2. "Please Please Please" (5 weeks); 3. "Taste" (9 weeks); 4. "Manchild" (2 weeks) | —N/a |
| Sam Fender | 23 | List: 1. "Rein Me In" (23 weeks) | —N/a |
| Taylor Swift | 21 | List: 1. "Anti-Hero" (6 weeks); 2. "Is It Over Now?" (1 week); 3. "Fortnight" (1 week); 4. "The Fate of Ophelia" (7 weeks); 5. "Opalite" (1 week); 6. "I Knew It, I Knew You" (2 weeks); 7. "Patient Zero" (3 weeks) | —N/a |
| Dave | 16 | List: 1. "Starlight" (4 weeks); 2. "Sprinter" (10 weeks); 3. "Raindance" (2 weeks) | —N/a |
| Olivia Rodrigo | 16 | List: 1. "Drivers License" (9 weeks); 2. "Good 4 U" (5 weeks); 3. "Vampire" (1 week); 4. "Drop Dead" (1 week) | —N/a |
| Alex Warren | 13 | List: 1. "Ordinary" (13 weeks) | —N/a |
| Wham! | 12 | List: 1. "Last Christmas" (12 weeks) | —N/a |
| Harry Styles | 12 | List: 1. "As It Was" (10 weeks); 2. "Aperture" (1 week); 3. "American Girls" (1 week) | —N/a |
| Miley Cyrus | 10 | List: 1. "Flowers" (10 weeks) | —N/a |
| Central Cee | 10 | List: 1. "Sprinter" (10 weeks) | —N/a |
| Huntrix | 10 | List: 1. "Golden" (10 weeks) | —N/a |
| Ejae | 10 | List: 1. "Golden" (10 weeks) | —N/a |
| Audrey Nuna | 10 | List: 1. "Golden" (10 weeks) | —N/a |
| Rei Ami | 10 | List: 1. "Golden" (10 weeks) | —N/a |
| KPop Demon Hunters Cast | 10 | List: 1. "Golden" (10 weeks) | —N/a |

=== Record labels with the most weeks at number one ===
Twelve record labels have spent ten or more weeks at the top of the UK singles chart during the 2020s.

| Record label | Number ones | Weeks at number one |
|---|---|---|
| Columbia Records | 12 | 45 |
| Republic Records | 7 | 37 |
| Interscope Records | 10 | 32 |
| Atlantic Records | 9 | 32 |
| Island Records | 7 | 30 |
| EMI | 12 | 29 |
| Polydor Records | 5 | 28 |
| Asylum Records (Note: Asylum Records was jointly credited alongside Perfect Havoc, a dance record label founded by Adam Griffin and Robert Davies, on Joel Corry's number one hit.) | 4 | 22 |
| Geffen Records | 4 | 16 |
| Neighbourhood | 3 | 16 |
| Warner Music UK | 6 | 14 |
| RCA Records | 2 | 13 |

== See also ==
- List of UK Albums Chart number ones of the 2020s
