= List of Billboard Adult Contemporary number ones of 2022 =

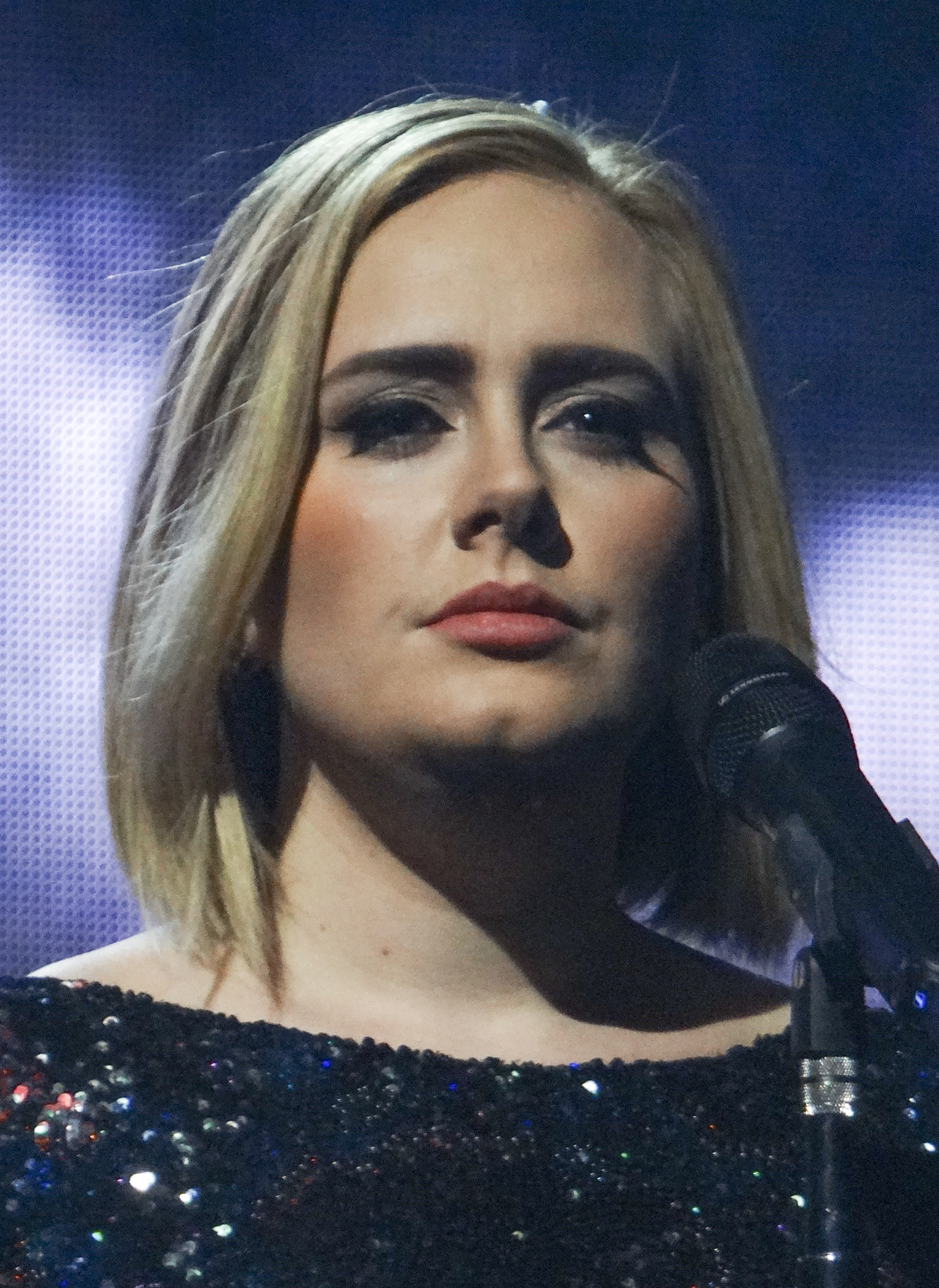
Adele returned to number one on the second chart of the year with "Easy on Me" and spent 21 weeks at number one in 2022.

Adult Contemporary is a chart published by Billboard ranking the top-performing songs in the United States in the adult contemporary music (AC) market, based on weekly airplay data from radio stations compiled by Broadcast Data Systems.

The first number one of the year, in the issue of Billboard dated January 1, was "Merry Christmas" by Ed Sheeran and Elton John. It was John's 17th Adult Contemporary number one, extending his lead for the most among all artists on the chart, and also set a new record for the longest timespan of AC number ones by an artist, coming more than 48 years after he first topped the listing. The following week "Easy on Me" by Adele returned to the number one spot, having spent three weeks atop the chart in 2021; the song remained at number one for 19 consecutive weeks until it was replaced in the issue dated May 21 as John returned to number one with "Cold Heart (Pnau remix)", a collaboration with Dua Lipa.

In the issue dated December 3, Backstreet Boys topped the chart with their version of the 1980s song "Last Christmas", which remained in the peak position for the rest of the year. The song continued a trend of Christmas-themed tracks topping the AC chart in late November and throughout December, reflecting the fact that adult contemporary radio stations usually switch to playing exclusively festive songs in the period leading up to the holiday. It marked the first time the band had topped the chart since "I Want It That Way" in 1999.

== Chart history ==
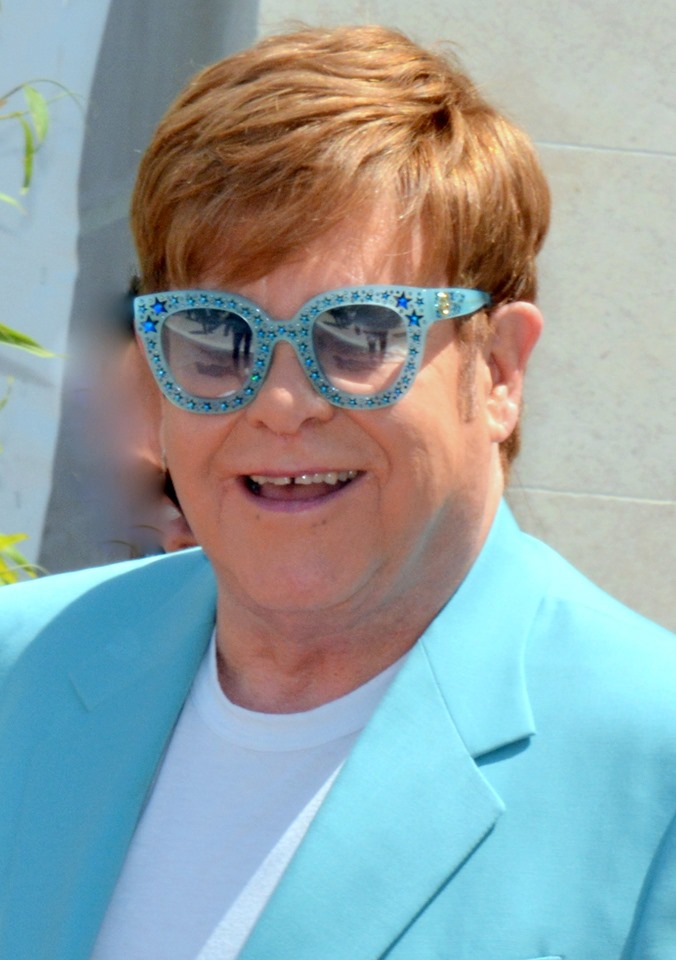
Elton John extended his record for the most AC number ones when "Merry Christmas", his collaboration with Ed Sheeran, topped the first chart of the year, and when "Cold Heart (Pnau remix)", his collaboration with Dua Lipa, topped the charts in May.

Key
†	Indicates best-performing AC song of 2022

Issue date	Title	Artist(s)	Ref.
January 1	"Merry Christmas"	Ed Sheeran and Elton John	
January 8	"Easy on Me" †	Adele	
January 15	"Easy on Me" †	Adele	
January 22	"Easy on Me" †	Adele	
January 29	"Easy on Me" †	Adele	
February 5	"Easy on Me" †	Adele	
February 12	"Easy on Me" †	Adele	
February 19	"Easy on Me" †	Adele	
February 26	"Easy on Me" †	Adele	
March 5	"Easy on Me" †	Adele	
March 12	"Easy on Me" †	Adele	
March 19	"Easy on Me" †	Adele	
March 26	"Easy on Me" †	Adele	
April 2	"Easy on Me" †	Adele	
April 9	"Easy on Me" †	Adele	
April 16	"Easy on Me" †	Adele	
April 23	"Easy on Me" †	Adele	
April 30	"Easy on Me" †	Adele	
May 7	"Easy on Me" †	Adele	
May 14	"Easy on Me" †	Adele	
May 21	"Cold Heart (Pnau remix)"	Elton John and Dua Lipa	
May 28	"Easy on Me" †	Adele	
June 4	"Cold Heart (Pnau remix)"	Elton John and Dua Lipa	
June 11	"Cold Heart (Pnau remix)"	Elton John and Dua Lipa	
June 18	"Easy on Me" †	Adele	
June 25	"Cold Heart (Pnau remix)"	Elton John and Dua Lipa	
July 2	"Cold Heart (Pnau remix)"	Elton John and Dua Lipa	
July 9	"Cold Heart (Pnau remix)"	Elton John and Dua Lipa	
July 16	"Cold Heart (Pnau remix)"	Elton John and Dua Lipa	
July 23	"Cold Heart (Pnau remix)"	Elton John and Dua Lipa	
July 30	"Cold Heart (Pnau remix)"	Elton John and Dua Lipa	
August 6	"Cold Heart (Pnau remix)"	Elton John and Dua Lipa	
August 13	"Cold Heart (Pnau remix)"	Elton John and Dua Lipa	
August 20	"Cold Heart (Pnau remix)"	Elton John and Dua Lipa	
August 27	"Cold Heart (Pnau remix)"	Elton John and Dua Lipa	
September 3	"Cold Heart (Pnau remix)"	Elton John and Dua Lipa	
September 10	"As It Was"	Harry Styles	
September 17	"As It Was"	Harry Styles	
September 24	"As It Was"	Harry Styles	
October 1	"As It Was"	Harry Styles	
October 8	"As It Was"	Harry Styles	
October 15	"As It Was"	Harry Styles	
October 22	"As It Was"	Harry Styles	
October 29	"As It Was"	Harry Styles	
November 5	"As It Was"	Harry Styles	
November 12	"Unstoppable"	Sia	
November 19	"As It Was"	Harry Styles	
November 26	"As It Was"	Harry Styles	
December 3	"Last Christmas"	Backstreet Boys	
December 10	"Last Christmas"	Backstreet Boys	
December 17	"Last Christmas"	Backstreet Boys	
December 24	"Last Christmas"	Backstreet Boys	
December 31	"Last Christmas"	Backstreet Boys	
