= Sausage Rolls for Everyone =

Single by LadBaby featuring Ed Sheeran and Elton John
- Released: 17 December 2021
- Length: 3:27
- Label: Frtyfve
- Songwriters: Mark Hoyle; Roxanne Hoyle; Ed Sheeran; Elton John; Steve McCutcheon
- Producer: Jamie Sellers

LadBaby singles chronology
"Don't Stop Me Eatin'" (2020)	"Sausage Rolls for Everyone" (2021)	"Food Aid" (2022)

Ed Sheeran singles chronology
"Merry Christmas" (2021)	"Sausage Rolls for Everyone" (2021)	"Peru" (2021)

Elton John singles chronology
"Merry Christmas" (2021)	"Sausage Rolls for Everyone" (2021)	"Hold Me Closer" (2022)

Music video
- "Sausage Rolls for Everyone" on YouTube

"Sausage Rolls for Everyone" is a song by British blogger couple LadBaby, featuring vocals from British musicians Ed Sheeran and Elton John. It was released through Frtyfve as a single on 17 December 2021. "Sausage Rolls for Everyone" is a remix and comedy version of Sheeran and John's single "Merry Christmas", which was released exactly two weeks earlier. It has a sausage roll theme as a charity single with the proceeds going to The Trussell Trust.

== Background ==
In December 2021, LadBaby announced their bid to become the first act in history to secure four consecutive Christmas number one singles. As with their previous three singles, "We Built This City", "I Love Sausage Rolls" and "Don't Stop Me Eatin'", all proceeds from the single went to The Trussell Trust.

"Sausage Rolls for Everyone" was also released as an acoustic version without Sheeran and John. This slower-paced version had a credit for The Food Bank Choir and a new video recorded at St Margaret's the Queen Church (as it is where the Norwood and Brixton Food Bank is located), featuring the Hoyles alongside stroke survivor Donna Kennedy and her 12-year-old son Ronan. Both versions contributed to the single's 136,445 sales total (including 110,882 downloads and 4,898 CDs being sold), though in this instance the Official Charts Company decided to keep Sheeran and John's credit as part of the chart information.

== Commercial performance ==
The song debuted at number one in the UK Singles Chart on 24 December 2021 and became the 70th Christmas number-one single in the history of the chart since its introduction in 1952. It gave LadBaby their fourth Christmas number one, Sheeran his second (after 2017's "Perfect") and John his first. LadBaby became only the third act, i.e. after Cliff Richard (including in his role as a member of Band Aid II) and the Beatles, to secure four Christmas number-one singles, and also made history by becoming the first act to achieve four consecutive Christmas chart-toppers, surpassing the joint record of the Beatles, Richard and the Spice Girls.

"Sausage Rolls for Everyone" also gave Sheeran his fourth number one of 2021 and took him up to joint fifth position on the list of most number-one singles on the UK Singles Chart alongside Madonna. As the preceding record at the top was the original version of "Merry Christmas" (which ended up at number 2 on the Christmas chart with a sales total of 90,508), it made Sheeran the second artist after The Shadows who managed to replace themselves at the top of the charts for a third time, with Sheeran managing this first in January 2018 and with "Shivers" and "Bad Habits" taking turns at the top earlier in 2021. "Sausage Rolls for Everyone" was also Elton John's third number one of 2021 and took him to the joint ninth place on the list of most number ones, joining Calvin Harris and Eminem with 10 number ones each.

On 31 December 2021, "Sausage Rolls For Everyone" was replaced at number one by the original "Merry Christmas", when it dropped to number 29 in the charts, managing a second week in the UK Top 40 and equalling the drop of 2015's "A Bridge over You" by the Lewisham and Greenwich NHS Choir, which had a record-breaking fall from the top before "I Love Sausage Rolls" was released. "Sausage Rolls For Everyone" was one of five hits Sheeran was credited on that week, as the Official Charts Company added Sheeran to the credit of Fireboy DML's single "Peru" when the remix debuted in the Top 40, one position higher than LadBaby's single, at number 28.

== Charts ==
Chart performance for "Sausage Rolls for Everyone"
Chart (2021)	Peak position
Australia (ARIA)	48
Canada (Hot Canadian Digital Songs)	3
Euro Digital Song Sales (Billboard)	1
Global 200 (Billboard)	48
Hungary (Single Top 40)	12
Ireland (IRMA)	41
Netherlands (Single Tip)	30
New Zealand Hot Singles (RMNZ)	7
UK Singles (OCC)	1
UK Indie (OCC)	1
US Digital Song Sales (Billboard)	5
US Holiday Digital Song Sales (Billboard)	1
