= Cold Heart (Pnau remix) =

2021 single by Elton John and Dua Lipa

Single by Elton John and Dua Lipa

from the album The Lockdown Sessions
- Released: 13 August 2021
- Recorded: 2020
- Genre: Dance; dance-pop; synth-pop; medley
- Length: 3:22
- Label: EMI; Mercury
- Songwriters: Elton John; Andrew Meecham; Bernie Taupin; Dean Meredith; Nicholas Littlemore; Peter Mayes; Sam Littlemore
- Producer: Pnau

Elton John singles chronology
"It's a Sin" (2021)	"Cold Heart (Pnau remix)" (2021)	"After All" (2021)

Dua Lipa singles chronology
"Demeanor" (2021)	"Cold Heart (Pnau remix)" (2021)	"Sweetest Pie" (2022)

Music video
- "Cold Heart (Pnau remix)" on YouTube

"Cold Heart (Pnau remix)" is a song by British singer and songwriter Elton John, recorded with Dua Lipa for the former's collaborative studio album The Lockdown Sessions (2021). It was released on 13 August 2021 as the lead single from the album for digital download and streaming in various countries by EMI and Mercury. Created during the COVID-19 pandemic, the collaboration between the artists was a testament to their friendship, which was established in November 2020. The song is a medley of four songs written by John and Bernie Taupin, as well as Andrew Meecham, Dean Meredith, Nicholas Littlemore, Peter Mayes and Sam Littlemore, with the production completed by the latter three as part of the dance music group Pnau. A medley of John's songs "Rocket Man" (1972), "Kiss the Bride" (1983), "Sacrifice" (1989) and "Where's the Shoorah?" (1976), the remix is an upbeat contemporary synth-pop, dance, dance-pop and pop song describing the decline of a relationship.

"Cold Heart (Pnau remix)" reached the top position in the United Kingdom and marked Lipa's third and John's eighth chart-topping single on the UK singles chart. The song achieved number one in the rankings of 12 other countries, including Australia, Canada and New Zealand. It also entered the top 10 in an additional 22 countries, including Ireland, South Africa and the United States. It peaked atop the Canadian AC, CHR/Top 40 and Hot AC as well as the US Adult Contemporary, Adult Top 40 and Hot Dance/Electronic Songs rankings, respectively. The song received two gold and multiple platinum certifications as well as two diamond awards from the Syndicat National de l'Édition Phonographique (SNEP) in France and the Polish Society of the Phonographic Industry (ZPAV) in Poland, respectively. In 2022, it won an award in the category for the Collaboration of the Year at the American Music Awards and the Top Dance/Electronic Song at the Billboard Music Awards.

"Cold Heart (Pnau remix)" was met with a warm reception from music critics for its lyrics, sound and incorporation of John's four songs. Produced during the COVID-19 pandemic, the animated music video premiered on John's YouTube channel on 13 August 2021, with the aspiration of crafting a celebratory and joyful galaxy. It traces the adventure of John and Lipa together with four other animated characters as they explore the colorful and nature-filled psychedelic landscapes. An acoustic version and three additional remixes accompanied the song: renditions by Claptone, PS1 and The Blessed Madonna. The song was further promoted with a live performance in Los Angeles on 20 November as part of John's Farewell Yellow Brick Road tour, which was streamed on Disney+. In 2022, it was ranked among the 10th most-streamed songs globally on Apple Music and Spotify.

== Background and development ==
Due to the outbreak of the pandemic of COVID-19, John was compelled to temporarily halt his Farewell Yellow Brick Road world tour in March 2020. Amidst the lockdown caused by the pandemic, the singer pursued a series of collaborations, one of which was "Cold Heart (Pnau remix)" with Lipa, as part of his upcoming studio album. The album's songs were recorded over an 18-month period, either remotely through Zoom or in compliance with strict health and safety regulations. Leading up to its release, John and Lipa previewed their collaborative effort by publishing cartoon representations of themselves, while dancing to a disco melody on their respective social media accounts on 10 August 2021. The following day, the artists confirmed the song's title, "Cold Heart (Pnau remix)" and announced its release date set for 13 August. The collaboration between the artists on the song was a testament to the friendship forged between the two, which was established through John's participation in Lipa's Studio 2054 livestream in November 2020 and further strengthened by Lipa's performance at the Elton John AIDS Foundation Academy Awards Viewing Party in August 2021. John stated, "[Lipa has] given me so much energy. She's a truly wonderful artist, and person, absolutely bursting with creativity and ideas. The energy she brought to ['the song'] just blew my mind." Lipa further added, "It has been an absolute honour and privilege to collaborate on this track with him. It's so very special [...] I loved being part of such a creative and joyous experience."

== Music and lyrics ==
"Cold Heart (Pnau remix)" (2021)
A 16-second sample of "Cold Heart (Pnau Remix)", featuring an interpolation of Elton John's single "Rocket Man" (1972) with vocals from Dua Lipa.

"Cold Heart (Pnau remix)" was written by John, Andrew Meecham, Bernie Taupin, Dean Meredith, Nicholas Littlemore, Peter Mayes and Sam Littlemore, with the production completed by the latter three, who form the group Pnau. The song has a duration time of three minutes and 22 seconds and was composed in the time signature of 4/4 and the key of B♭ minor, with a tempo of 116 beats per minute. The song is constructed in the verse–chorus form and uses the chord progression B♭m7–E♭m7–G♭-Fm7. The song was released for digital download and streaming in various countries by EMI and Mercury on 13 August 2021 as the lead single from John's 32nd studio album The Lockdown Sessions (2021). Paying homage to John's career, it interpolates his songs "Rocket Man" (1972), "Kiss the Bride" (1983), "Sacrifice" (1989) and "Where's the Shoorah?" (1976). The sample of "Where's the Shoorah?" appears at the 3:19 mark, with a tempo from 116 BPM to 130 BPM and a key shifted from an E♭ major to B♭ minor. "Cold Heart (Pnau remix)" is an upbeat, contemporary synth-pop, dance, dance-pop and pop song, with club, disco and house beats. The lyrics transmit the chorus from "Rocket Man", which includes "And I think it's gonna be a long, long time 'til touchdown brings me 'round again to find / I'm not the man they think I am at home", and verses from "Sacrifice", such as "Cold, cold heart / hardened by you / Some things look better baby / Just passing through". They describe a relationship that has taken a turn for the worse due to the hardening of the singer's heart.

== Critical reception ==
"Cold Heart (Pnau remix)" was met with a warm reception from music critics, with many complimenting the combination of John's previous hits in the song. David Smyth from Evening Standard characterised the song as a "particularly slick updating of classic Elton". Annie Zaleski for Variety declared the result of the mashup to be "relentlessly modern, a seamless (and savvy) [fusion] of eras". Althea Legaspi of Rolling Stone highlighted that the songs received a "groove-tipped refresh" in the song. Lars Brandle from Billboard described the mashup as "expertly created". Billboard's Stephen Daw thought that "Dua Lipa's voice sounds like butter as she croons the iconic chorus 'And I think it's gonna be a long, long time,' while the production from PNAU never goes over-the-top, only complementing John's original visions." Helen Brown of The Independent wrote that the song "does a terrific job [combining] 'Sacrifice' and 'Rocket Man', giving both a tendon-twanging freshness". Lakshmi Govindrajan Javeri from Firstpost elaborated that the song "blends iconic portions of 'Sacrifice' and 'Rocket Man' to create a number that puritans will grudgingly admit is addictive at best, sacrilegious at worst".

Emily Lee for iHeart commented that the mashup "may seem like a chaotic choice [but] Pnau [...] pull it together seamlessly". Robert Moran for Sydney Morning Herald dubbed the song "ubiquitous", commending its blend of "Lipa's vocals on the hook and Pnau's atmospheric house sound and signature chants". Daniela Avila of People labeled the song as a "perfect dancefloor singalong". Charlie Dukes from Renowned for Sound marked the song as a "modern anthem" that "the world never knew it needed". Gary Ryan for NME inscribed that the song "imperiously drapes itself over the disco-revival chaise longue". Will Hodgkinson of The Times wrote that the song "sounds cheesy as hell, yet the end result is so vibrant that you cannot help but be cheered by it". Jordan Robledo from Gay Times praised John and Lipa's "incredible" vocal delivery that are "sure to leave fans yearning for their own trip to the dance floor". In conclusion, Jem Aswad for Variety found the song "a living example of [John's] legendary patronage of younger artists and represents a new concept in mainstream musical reinvention". Terry Staunton of Record Collector was less impressed, deriding it as "awkward" and "a little out of step".

Some criticised the performance, such as The Mix Review, which commented it was boring and an excuse to cash in.

== Accolades ==
In 2022, "Cold Heart (Pnau remix)" won an award in the category for the Collaboration of the Year at the American Music Awards and the Top Dance/Electronic Song at the Billboard Music Awards. It was nominated for the Song of the Year at the Brit Awards, the Most Performed Work at the Ivor Novello Awards and the Best Collaboration and Song of the Year at the MTV Video Music Awards. In 2023, the song received nominations for the Best Collaboration and Dance Song of the Year at the iHeartRadio Music Awards. Billboard and Los Angeles Times included "Cold Heart (Pnau remix)" in their year-end lists of the best songs for 2021. John and Lipa were further recognised as the "Hitmakers of the Year" by the American magazine Variety in 2022, for the charting success of their collaboration on the charts. During the summer of 2022, the song was ranked as the 19th most-streamed song on Spotify worldwide. On the year-end lists, it was ranked as the sixth and seventh most-streamed song on Spotify and Apple, respectively. The song was also the most "shazamed" song of the year on Shazam worldwide of that year.

== Commercial performance ==
In the United Kingdom, "Cold Heart (Pnau remix)" debuted at number 33 on the UK singles chart in the issue dated 26 August 2021. The song reached number one, having spent three consecutive weeks at number two, with sales of 64,000, including 5.9 million streams and 5,000 copies on limited edition CD single, in its ninth week on the chart on 21 October. It represented Lipa's third chart-topping single in the UK, after "New Rules" (2017) and "One Kiss" (2018), and John's eighth and first in 16 years, since he was featured artist on American rapper 2Pac's posthumous single "Ghetto Gospel" (2005). John also became the first solo artist to achieve a top 10 single in six different decades, spanning from the 1970s to the 2020s. In October 2026, the song received quintuple platinum certification from the British Phonographic Industry (BPI) for shifting more than 3,000,000 units in the UK. In Australia, "Cold Heart (Pnau remix)" reached number one on the ARIA Singles Chart for 10 consecutive weeks as well as number one on the New Zealand Singles Chart in New Zealand. The song marked Lipa's first chart-topping single in Australia as well as John's first one since "Something About the Way You Look Tonight" / "Candle in the Wind 1997" in 1997. Also in 2022, it garnered a ten-times platinum certification from Recorded Music New Zealand (RMNZ) in New Zealand for selling more than 300,000 units. In Australia, it was certified fifteen-times platinum by the Australian Recording Industry Association (ARIA) for selling 1,050,000 equivalent units.

In Canada, "Cold Heart (Pnau remix)" reached number one on the Canadian Hot 100 in the issue dated 8 January 2022, having spent a total of 12 consecutive weeks. The song also reached the top position on the Canada AC, CHR/Top 40 and Hot AC rankings, respectively. In October 2022, it received a septuple platinum certification from Music Canada (MC) for shifting more than 560,000 units in the Canada. In the United States, "Cold Heart (Pnau remix)" entered the Billboard Hot 100 at number 81 on 28 August 2021 and rose to number 32 in its fifth week, giving John the longest span of top 40 Hot 100 appearances, excluding holiday fare. The song reached its summit at number 7 on the ranking issue dated 15 January 2022, earning Lipa's fourth top 10 single on the chart and John's 28th entry. Topping the Adult Contemporary and Adult Top 40 rankings, it further peaked at number one on the Hot Dance/Electronic Songs chart, logging its 34th week at the top on 11 June. In May 2022, the song garnered a double certification from the Recording Industry Association of America (RIAA) in the US for selling more than 2,000,000 units.

"Cold Heart (Pnau remix)" reached the top position in Bulgaria, the Commonwealth of Independent States (CIS), Croatia, the Czech Republic, Iceland, Lithuania, Mexico, Poland, Ukraine and Wallonia. Top 10 positions were also achieved in Austria, Costa Rica, Denmark, El Salvador, Flanders, France, Germany, Greece, Hungary, Ireland, Italy, Luxembourg, the Netherlands, Norway, Portugal, Romania, Russia, Slovakia, South Africa, Sweden, Switzerland and Uruguay. The song received a gold certifications from IFPI Greece in Greece and IFPI Switzerland in Switzerland. It was certified double platinum in Denmark, Mexico and Norway as well as triple platinum in Austria, Italy, Portugal, and Sweden, and six-times Platinum in Spain. The song further garnered a diamond certification from the Syndicat National de l'Édition Phonographique (SNEP) in France and the Polish Society of the Phonographic Industry (ZPAV) in Poland.

== Music video and promotion ==
Scene from the music video of "Cold Heart (Pnau remix)", showcasing Elton John and Dua Lipa as animated characters celebrating on one side of the Milky Way

To accompany the release, a music video for "Cold Heart (Pnau remix)" premiered to John's official YouTube channel on 13 August 2021. Created in the isolation of the pandemic, Raman Djafari of Blink Ink directed the animated and imaginative video with the aspiration of crafting a galaxy "full of celebration, dance and joy". Gareth Owen and Josef Byrne produced the video with the characters of John and Lipa being designed by Seo Young. The video traces the adventure of John and Lipa, portrayed as animated characters, together with four claymation-described 3D characters that dance to disco music, as they explore colorful and nature-filled galaxies and psychedelic landscapes. In a sequence, the use of hand-drawn 2D elements enhances the visual frames, imparting an ethereal atmosphere to the animation. One of the dancers draws a shooting star in the sky, while flying fish appear to radiate from the movements of their dancing shoes. At the same time, towering flowers with eyes emerge and envelop the dancers, imbuing them with a sense of nature. There is also a psychedelic countryside sequence featuring flowers with puckered petals that sway in time with the music, and clouds fashioned into the shapes of unicorns and castles. The animated characters bring their journey to a close by joining John and Lipa in a dance celebration at a garden party located on one side of the Milky Way. John Russell from Grazia expressed his admiration for the video, while characterising it as "gorgeous" and highlighting its animation theme. Robledo for Gay Times referred to the video as "stunning" and deemed it to be "a fun and mind-blowing experience". Paulina Vales of The Honey Pop declared the video as the year's "most iconic animated video" and commended its aesthetics and fashion, writing that "[John and Lipa brought] us joy we were missing in our life".

While being streamed by American streaming platform Disney+, John and Lipa performed "Cold Heart (Pnau remix)" live at Dodger Stadium in Los Angeles as part of the former's Farewell Yellow Brick Road world tour on 20 November 2022. Three remixes of the song, including a rendition by German disc jockey Claptone and American disc jockey the Blessed Madonna, accompanied the single's release between September and October 2021. The rendition by the Blessed Madonna marked the second time that she had remixed a song from Lipa, following the remix of "Levitating" (2020). Samantha Reis from We Rave You gave a favorable assessment of the remix, stating that it took the already "club-ready beat" and elevated its "clubby vibe" to the maximum. Ariel King for Dancing Astronaut also positively commented that the remix "fits neatly into a sparkling club atmosphere while maintaining Lipa's disco aesthetic". The remix was accompanied by a visualiser video as a remix of the official music video, displaying animated eyes and fantastical creatures.

== Track listing ==
- Digital download and streaming
1. "Cold Heart" (Pnau Remix) – 3:22
- Digital download and streaming
1. "Cold Heart" (Acoustic) – 3:15
- Digital download and streaming
1. "Cold Heart" (Claptone Remix) – 3:03
- Digital download and streaming
1. "Cold Heart" (PS1 Remix) – 2:47
- Digital download and streaming
1. "Cold Heart" (The Blessed Madonna Remix) – 2:53
2. "Cold Heart" (The Blessed Madonna Extended Mix) – 4:33

== Credits and personnel ==
Credits adapted from Tidal.

- Elton John – lead artist, composing, songwriting
- Dua Lipa – lead artist
- Pnau – lead artists, remixing
  - Nicholas Littlemore – composing, producing, programming, songwriting
  - Peter Mayes – composing, engineering, producing, programming, songwriting
  - Sam Littlemore – composing, producing, programming, songwriting
- Andrew Meecham – composing, songwriting
- Bernie Taupin – composing, songwriting
- Dean Meredith – composing, songwriting
- Josh Gudwin – mastering, mixing
- Mark Schick – vocal producing
- Rafael Fadul – engineering
- Joseph Smith – lead engineering

== Charts ==
=== Weekly charts ===
Weekly chart performance for "Cold Heart (Pnau remix)"
Chart (2021–2024)	Peak position
Argentina Hot 100 (Billboard)	27
Australia (ARIA)	1
Austria (Ö3 Austria Top 40)	3
Belarus Airplay (TopHit)	82
Belgium (Ultratop 50 Flanders)	2
Belgium (Ultratop 50 Wallonia)	1
Bolivia Airplay (Monitor Latino)	12
Brazil Airplay (Top 100 Brasil)	41
Bulgaria Airplay (PROPHON)	1
Canada Hot 100 (Billboard)	1
Canada AC (Billboard)	1
Canada CHR/Top 40 (Billboard)	1
Canada Hot AC (Billboard)	1
Chile (Billboard)	15
CIS Airplay (TopHit)	1
Costa Rica (FONOTICA)	9
Croatia International Airplay (Top lista)	1
Czech Republic Airplay (ČNS IFPI)	1
Czech Republic Singles Digital (ČNS IFPI)	13
Denmark (Tracklisten)	2
Dominican Republic Streaming (SodinPro)	42
Ecuador Airplay (Monitor Latino)	20
El Salvador Airplay (Monitor Latino)	2
Euro Digital Song Sales (Billboard)	1
Estonia Airplay (TopHit)	54
Finland (Suomen virallinen lista)	14
France Airplay (SNEP)	1
France (SNEP)	9
Germany (GfK)	3
Global 200 (Billboard)	3
Greece International (IFPI)	8
Hungary (Dance Top 40)	4
Hungary (Rádiós Top 40)	1
Hungary (Single Top 40)	2
Hungary (Stream Top 40)	7
Iceland (Tónlistinn)	1
Ireland (IRMA)	2
Italy (FIMI)	6
Japan Hot Overseas (Billboard)	8
Kazakhstan Airplay (TopHit)	29
Lithuania (AGATA)	1
Luxembourg (Billboard)	4
Mexico (Billboard)	17
Mexico Airplay (Billboard)	1
Moldova Airplay (TopHit)	47
Netherlands (Dutch Top 40)	2
Netherlands (Single Top 100)	8
New Zealand (Recorded Music NZ)	1
Norway (VG-lista)	4
Paraguay Streaming (SGP)	53
Peru Streaming (UNIMPRO)	67
Poland Airplay (ZPAV)	1
Portugal (AFP)	10
Romania Airplay (UPFR)	4
Romania Airplay (Media Forest)	1
Romania TV Airplay (Media Forest)	6
Russia Airplay (TopHit)	1
San Marino Airplay (SMRTV Top 50)	3
Singapore (RIAS)	19
Slovakia Airplay (ČNS IFPI)	2
Slovakia Singles Digital (ČNS IFPI)	6
South Africa Streaming (TOSAC)	9
Spain (Promusicae)	15
Suriname (Nationale Top 40)	4
Sweden (Sverigetopplistan)	5
Switzerland (Schweizer Hitparade)	4
Ukraine Airplay (TopHit)	1
UK Singles (Official Charts)	1
Uruguay Airplay (Monitor Latino)	4
US Billboard Hot 100	7
US Adult Contemporary (Billboard)	1
US Adult Pop Airplay (Billboard)	1
US Hot Dance/Electronic Songs (Billboard)	1
US Pop Airplay (Billboard)	8
Vietnam Hot 100 (Billboard Vietnam)	95

Weekly chart performance
Chart (2026)	Peak position
Brazil Airplay (Crowley)	114
Lithuania Airplay (TopHit)	64
Romania Airplay (TopHit)	62

=== Monthly charts ===
2021–2023 monthly chart performance for "Cold Heart (Pnau remix)"
Chart (2021–2023)	Peak position
CIS Airplay (TopHit)	1
Estonia Airplay (TopHit)	67
Kazakhstan Airplay (TopHit)	35
Moldova Airplay (TopHit)	60
Romania Airplay (TopHit)	59
Russia Airplay (TopHit)	2
Ukraine Airplay (TopHit)	4

2026 monthly chart performance for "Cold Heart (Pnau remix)"
Chart (2026)	Peak position
Lithuania Airplay (TopHit)	68
Paraguay Airplay (SGP)	52
Romania Airplay (TopHit)	100

=== Year-end charts ===
2021 year-end chart performance for "Cold Heart (Pnau remix)"
Chart (2021)	Position
Australia (ARIA)	13
Austria (Ö3 Austria Top 40)	59
Belgium (Ultratop 50 Flanders)	32
Belgium (Ultratop 50 Wallonia)	19
Canada (Canadian Hot 100)	77
CIS Airplay (TopHit)	29
Denmark (Tracklisten)	31
France (SNEP)	60
Germany (Official German Charts)	49
Global 200 (Billboard)	117
Hungary (Dance Top 100)	47
Hungary (Rádiós Top 100)	89
Hungary (Single Top 100)	5
Hungary (Stream Top 100)	39
Iceland (Tónlistinn)	19
Ireland (IRMA)	19
Italy (FIMI)	62
Netherlands (Dutch Top 40)	11
Netherlands (Single Top 100)	32
New Zealand (Recorded Music NZ)	23
Poland (ZPAV)	23
Portugal (AFP)	103
Russia Airplay (TopHit)	35
Sweden (Sverigetopplistan)	84
Switzerland (Schweizer Hitparade)	39
UK Singles (OCC)	21
US Adult Contemporary (Billboard)	20
US Adult Top 40 (Billboard)	46
US Hot Dance/Electronic Songs (Billboard)	8

2022 year-end chart performance for "Cold Heart (Pnau remix)"
Chart (2022)	Position
Australia (ARIA)	4
Austria (Ö3 Austria Top 40)	7
Belgium (Ultratop 50 Flanders)	7
Belgium (Ultratop 50 Wallonia)	23
Brazil Airplay (Crowley)	73
Brazil Streaming (Pro-Música Brasil)	78
Canada (Canadian Hot 100)	1
CIS Airplay (TopHit)	3
Croatia International Airplay (Top lista)	1
Denmark (Tracklisten)	14
France (SNEP)	23
Germany (Official German Charts)	9
Global (IFPI)	4
Global 200 (Billboard)	4
Hungary (Dance Top 100)	6
Hungary (Rádiós Top 100)	99
Hungary (Single Top 100)	5
Hungary (Stream Top 100)	25
Iceland (Tónlistinn)	2
Italy (FIMI)	56
Lithuania (AGATA)	4
Netherlands (Single Top 100)	15
New Zealand (Recorded Music NZ)	1
Poland (ZPAV)	53
Russia Airplay (TopHit)	5
Spain (PROMUSICAE)	49
Sweden (Sverigetopplistan)	19
Switzerland (Schweizer Hitparade)	6
UK Singles (OCC)	13
Ukraine Airplay (TopHit)	9
US Billboard Hot 100	10
US Adult Contemporary (Billboard)	2
US Adult Top 40 (Billboard)	11
US Hot Dance/Electronic Songs (Billboard)	1
US Mainstream Top 40 (Billboard)	32

2023 year-end chart performance for "Cold Heart (Pnau remix)"
Chart (2023)	Position
Australia (ARIA)	28
Belarus Airplay (TopHit)	147
Belgium (Ultratop 50 Flanders)	89
Brazil Streaming (Pro-Música Brasil)	188
CIS Airplay (TopHit)	50
Denmark (Tracklisten)	83
Estonia Airplay (TopHit)	96
Global 200 (Billboard)	39
Hungary (Dance Top 100)	39
Kazakhstan Airplay (TopHit)	29
Moldova Airplay (TopHit)	129
Netherlands (Single Top 100)	68
New Zealand (Recorded Music NZ)	20
Poland (Polish Airplay Top 100)	86
Romania Airplay (TopHit)	99
Russia Airplay (TopHit)	140
Switzerland (Schweizer Hitparade)	31
Ukraine Airplay (TopHit)	27
UK Singles (OCC)	75
US Adult Contemporary (Billboard)	17
US Hot Dance/Electronic Songs (Billboard)	9

2024 year-end chart performance for "Cold Heart (Pnau remix)"
Chart (2024)	Position
Australia (ARIA)	85
Belarus Airplay (TopHit)	170
CIS Airplay (TopHit)	118
Global 200 (Billboard)	107
Lithuania Airplay (TopHit)	98
Portugal (AFP)	150
Romania Airplay (TopHit)	140

2025 year-end chart performance for "Cold Heart (Pnau remix)"
Chart (2025)	Position
Argentina Anglo Airplay (Monitor Latino)	38
Chile Airplay (Monitor Latino)	62
CIS Airplay (TopHit)	146
Lithuania Airplay (TopHit)	73
Romania Airplay (TopHit)	114

== Certifications ==
Certifications for "Cold Heart (Pnau remix)"
Region	Certification	Certified units/sales
Australia (ARIA)	15× Platinum	1,050,000^{‡}
Austria (IFPI Austria)	4× Platinum	120,000^{‡}
Brazil (Pro-Música Brasil)	3× Diamond	480,000^{‡}
Canada (Music Canada)	Diamond	800,000^{‡}
Denmark (IFPI Danmark)	2× Platinum	180,000^{‡}
France (SNEP)	Diamond	333,333^{‡}
Germany (BVMI)	3× Gold	600,000^{‡}
Italy (FIMI)	4× Platinum	400,000^{‡}
Mexico (AMPROFON)	2× Platinum+Gold	350,000^{‡}
New Zealand (RMNZ)	10× Platinum	300,000^{‡}
Norway (IFPI Norway)	2× Platinum	120,000^{‡}
Poland (ZPAV)	Diamond	250,000^{‡}
Portugal (AFP)	6× Platinum	60,000^{‡}
Spain (Promusicae)	6× Platinum	360,000^{‡}
Switzerland (IFPI Switzerland)	Gold	10,000^{‡}
United Kingdom (BPI)	5× Platinum	3,000,000^{‡}
United States (RIAA)	4× Platinum	4,000,000^{‡}
Streaming
Greece (IFPI Greece)	3× Platinum	6,000,000^{†}
Sweden (GLF)	3× Platinum	24,000,000^{†}
^{‡} Sales+streaming figures based on certification alone.^{†} Streaming-only figures based on certification alone.

== Release history ==
Release dates and formats for "Cold Heart (Pnau remix)"
Region	Date	Format(s)	Label(s)	Ref.
Various	13 August 2021	Digital download; streaming	EMI; Mercury	
France	13 August 2021	Radio airplay	EMI; Mercury	
Italy	13 August 2021	Radio airplay	Universal	
United Kingdom	13 August 2021	Various	EMI; Mercury	
United States	24 August 2021	Contemporary hit radio	Interscope	

== See also ==
- List of Australian chart achievements and milestones
- List of Billboard Adult Contemporary number ones of 2022
- List of Billboard Adult Top 40 number-one songs of the 2020s
- List of Billboard number-one dance songs of 2022
- List of Billboard Mexico Airplay number ones
- List of Canadian Hot 100 number-one singles of 2022
- List of Media Forest most-broadcast songs of the 2020s in Romania
- List of number-one singles of 2021 (Australia)
- List of number-one singles of 2021 (Poland)
- List of number-one singles of 2022 (Australia)
- List of number-one songs of the 2020s (Czech Republic)
- List of number-one singles of the 2020s (Hungary)
- List of UK Singles Chart number ones of the 2020s
- List of Ultratop 50 number-one singles of 2021
- New Zealand top 50 singles of 2022
- List of most-streamed songs on Spotify
- List of highest-certified singles in Australia
