= Merry Christmas (song) =

2021 single by Ed Sheeran and Elton John

Single by Ed Sheeran and Elton John

from the album = (Christmas Edition) and The Lockdown Sessions (Christmas Edition)
- Released: 3 December 2021
- Genre: Christmas
- Length: 3:29
- Label: Asylum; Atlantic
- Songwriters: Ed Sheeran; Elton John
- Producer: Steve Mac

Ed Sheeran singles chronology
"Overpass Graffiti" (2021)	"Merry Christmas" (2021)	"Sausage Rolls for Everyone" (2021)

Elton John singles chronology
"Finish Line" (2021)	"Merry Christmas" (2021)	"Sausage Rolls for Everyone" (2021)

Music video
- "Merry Christmas" on YouTube

"Merry Christmas" is a song by English singer-songwriter Ed Sheeran and British singer, songwriter and pianist Elton John. It was released through Asylum and Atlantic Records as a single on 3 December 2021. The song appears on the Christmas editions of both The Lockdown Sessions and =, John's collaborative album and Sheeran's fifth studio album, respectively. Sheeran and John wrote the song and it was produced by Steve Mac. "Merry Christmas" entered at the top of the UK singles chart during the chart week of 10 December 2021, becoming Sheeran's twelfth chart-topper in the country and John's ninth number-one single in the country. It also topped the charts in the Flanders region of Belgium, Ireland, the Netherlands and Switzerland.

== Background and promotion ==
"Merry Christmas" is Sheeran's first Christmas song, and John's third Christmas single, following the release of 1973's "Step into Christmas" and featuring with Neil Tennant on 2008's "Joseph, Better You than Me" by The Killers, although Sheeran had previously co-written the 2016 Christmas song "When Christmas Comes Around" by English singer Matt Terry. In an interview with NPO Radio 2 in October 2021, Sheeran revealed that John asked him to do a song with him the previous year after the success of "Step into Christmas". He also recalled writing the chorus of the song the same day he was asked by John.

On 29 November 2021, Sheeran and John both announced the collaboration and its release date. They also stated that all proceeds from the song in the United Kingdom will go towards donations for the Ed Sheeran Suffolk Music Foundation and the Elton John AIDS Foundation. In November 2021, on an appearance on The Tonight Show Starring Jimmy Fallon, Sheeran revealed that he went to stay with John after writing the song's chorus, in which they ended up making three Christmas songs together with "Merry Christmas" being one of them.

=== Music video ===
The official music video for "Merry Christmas" was premiered to Sheeran's YouTube channel alongside its release on 3 December 2021. Re-creating a scene from the festive romantic-comedy film Love Actually, the video sees Sheeran and John pay homage to scenes from British Christmas hits from the past, including "Last Christmas", "Walking in the Air", "I Wish It Could Be Christmas Everyday", "Merry Christmas Everyone" and "Stay Another Day". Several people made a cameo in the video including Jonathan Ross, Michael McIntyre, Big Narstie, Mr Blobby and the Darkness.

== Commercial performance ==
The song debuted at number one on 10 December 2021, knocking "Easy on Me" by Adele off the number one spot after seven consecutive weeks. The song stayed at number one for two weeks. The song became 2021's Christmas number two single on 24 December 2021, having been knocked off the top spot by "Sausage Rolls for Everyone" by LadBaby, a parody of "Merry Christmas" which features both Sheeran and John. As a result, 2021 became the first year that the Christmas number one and two singles were two versions of the same song by the same artists.

On 31 December 2021, "Sausage Rolls For Everyone" was replaced at number one by "Merry Christmas", when LadBaby dropped to number 29 in the charts. "Merry Christmas" was one of five hits Sheeran was credited on that week, as the Official Charts Company added Sheeran to the credit of Fireboy DML's single "Peru" when the remix debuted in the Top 40, one position higher than LadBaby's single, at number 28. On 7 January 2022, "Merry Christmas" became the first record with Standard Chart Ratio (SCR) streaming status to completely drop out of the Top 100 from number one, exiting at the same time as "Sausage Rolls For Everyone". It was replaced in the chart (as one of Sheeran's three main credited titles) by "Bad Habits" at number 12, joining "Overpass Graffiti" and "Shivers" in the chart at number 11 and 10 (though "Peru" was higher at number 6). If "Merry Christmas" had not been excluded from the Top 40 because of the primary artist rule, the record would have been around number 38 after amassing 8,271 sales that week.

== Charts ==
=== Weekly charts ===
Weekly chart performance for "Merry Christmas"
Chart (2021–2026)	Peak position
Australia (ARIA)	10
Austria (Ö3 Austria Top 40)	4
Belarus Airplay (TopHit)	116
Belgium (Ultratop 50 Flanders)	1
Belgium (Ultratop 50 Wallonia)	11
Canada Hot 100 (Billboard)	16
Canada AC (Billboard)	1
Canada CHR/Top 40 (Billboard)	32
Canada Hot AC (Billboard)	8
CIS Airplay (TopHit)	53
Croatia International Airplay (Top lista)	2
Czech Republic Airplay (ČNS IFPI)	21
Czech Republic Singles Digital (ČNS IFPI)	19
Denmark (Tracklisten)	12
Estonia Airplay (TopHit)	23
Euro Digital Song Sales (Billboard)	1
Finland (Suomen virallinen lista)	10
France (SNEP)	19
Germany (GfK)	4
Global 200 (Billboard)	14
Hungary (Rádiós Top 40)	24
Hungary (Single Top 40)	2
Hungary (Stream Top 40)	20
Ireland (IRMA)	1
Italy (FIMI)	31
Japan Hot 100 (Billboard)	77
Lebanon (Lebanese Top 20)	11
Lithuania (AGATA)	14
Luxembourg Streaming (Billboard)	14
Malta Airplay (Radiomonitor)	18
Mexico Airplay (Billboard)	24
Netherlands (Dutch Top 40)	1
Netherlands (Single Top 100)	11
New Zealand (Recorded Music NZ)	11
Norway (VG-lista)	10
Poland Airplay (ZPAV)	24
Poland (Polish Streaming Top 100)	42
Portugal (AFP)	73
Romania Airplay (TopHit)	62
Russia Airplay (TopHit)	152
Slovakia Airplay (ČNS IFPI)	24
Slovakia Singles Digital (ČNS IFPI)	23
South Africa Streaming (RISA)	57
South Korea (Gaon)	127
Sweden (Sverigetopplistan)	3
Switzerland (Schweizer Hitparade)	1
UK Singles (Official Charts)	1
Ukraine Airplay (TopHit)	31
US Billboard Hot 100	37
US Adult Contemporary (Billboard)	1
US Adult Pop Airplay (Billboard)	25
US Holiday 100 (Billboard)	29
US Pop Airplay (Billboard)	36

=== Monthly charts ===
Monthly chart performance for "Merry Christmas"
Chart (2023–2025)	Peak position
Lithuania Airplay (TopHit)	33
Romania Airplay (TopHit)	89
Ukraine Airplay (TopHit)	74

=== Year-end charts ===
2021 year-end chart performance for "Merry Christmas"
Chart (2021)	Position
Hungary (Single Top 40)	1

2022 year-end chart performance for "Merry Christmas"
Chart (2022)	Position
US Adult Contemporary (Billboard)	35

== Certifications ==
Region	Certification	Certified units/sales
Austria (IFPI Austria)	2× Platinum	60,000^{‡}
Canada (Music Canada)	Gold	40,000^{‡}
Denmark (IFPI Danmark)	Platinum	90,000^{‡}
France (SNEP)	Gold	100,000^{‡}
Germany (BVMI)	Gold	200,000^{‡}
Italy (FIMI)	Gold	50,000^{‡}
New Zealand (RMNZ)	Platinum	30,000^{‡}
Poland (ZPAV)	Platinum	50,000^{‡}
Switzerland (IFPI Switzerland)	Platinum	20,000^{‡}
United Kingdom (BPI)	2× Platinum	1,200,000^{‡}
United States (RIAA)	Gold	500,000^{‡}
^{‡} Sales+streaming figures based on certification alone.

== LadBaby version ==
"Sausage Rolls for Everyone"

Single by LadBaby featuring Ed Sheeran and Elton John
- Released: 17 December 2021
- Length: 3:27
- Label: Frtyfve
- Songwriters: Mark Hoyle; Roxanne Hoyle; Ed Sheeran; Elton John; Steve McCutcheon
- Producer: Jamie Sellers

LadBaby singles chronology
"Don't Stop Me Eatin'" (2020)	"Sausage Rolls for Everyone" (2021)	"Food Aid" (2022)

Ed Sheeran singles chronology
"Merry Christmas" (2021)	"Sausage Rolls for Everyone" (2021)	"Peru" (2021)

Elton John singles chronology
"Merry Christmas" (2021)	"Sausage Rolls for Everyone" (2021)	"Hold Me Closer" (2022)

Music video
- "Sausage Rolls for Everyone" on YouTube

In December 2021, English blogger couple LadBaby released a comedy version of the song titled "Sausage Rolls For Everyone'" with a sausage roll theme as a charity single whose proceeds go to The Trussell Trust. It was released as a single on 17 December 2021. Both Sheeran and John are featured on the song.

The song debuted at number one on the UK Singles Chart on 24 December 2021, giving LadBaby their fourth Christmas number one (also consecutive in their case), Sheeran his second (after 2017's "Perfect") and John his first.

=== Charts ===
Chart performance for "Sausage Rolls for Everyone"
Chart (2021–2022)	Peak position
Australia (ARIA)	48
Canada (Hot Canadian Digital Songs)	3
Euro Digital Song Sales (Billboard)	1
Global 200 (Billboard)	48
Hungary (Single Top 40)	12
Ireland (IRMA)	41
Netherlands (Single Tip)	30
New Zealand Hot Singles (RMNZ)	7
UK Singles (Official Charts)	1
UK Indie (Official Charts)	1
US Digital Song Sales (Billboard)	5
US Holiday Digital Song Sales (Billboard)	1

== See also ==
- List of Billboard Adult Contemporary number ones of 2022
