= LadBaby =

English YouTube personality (born 1987)

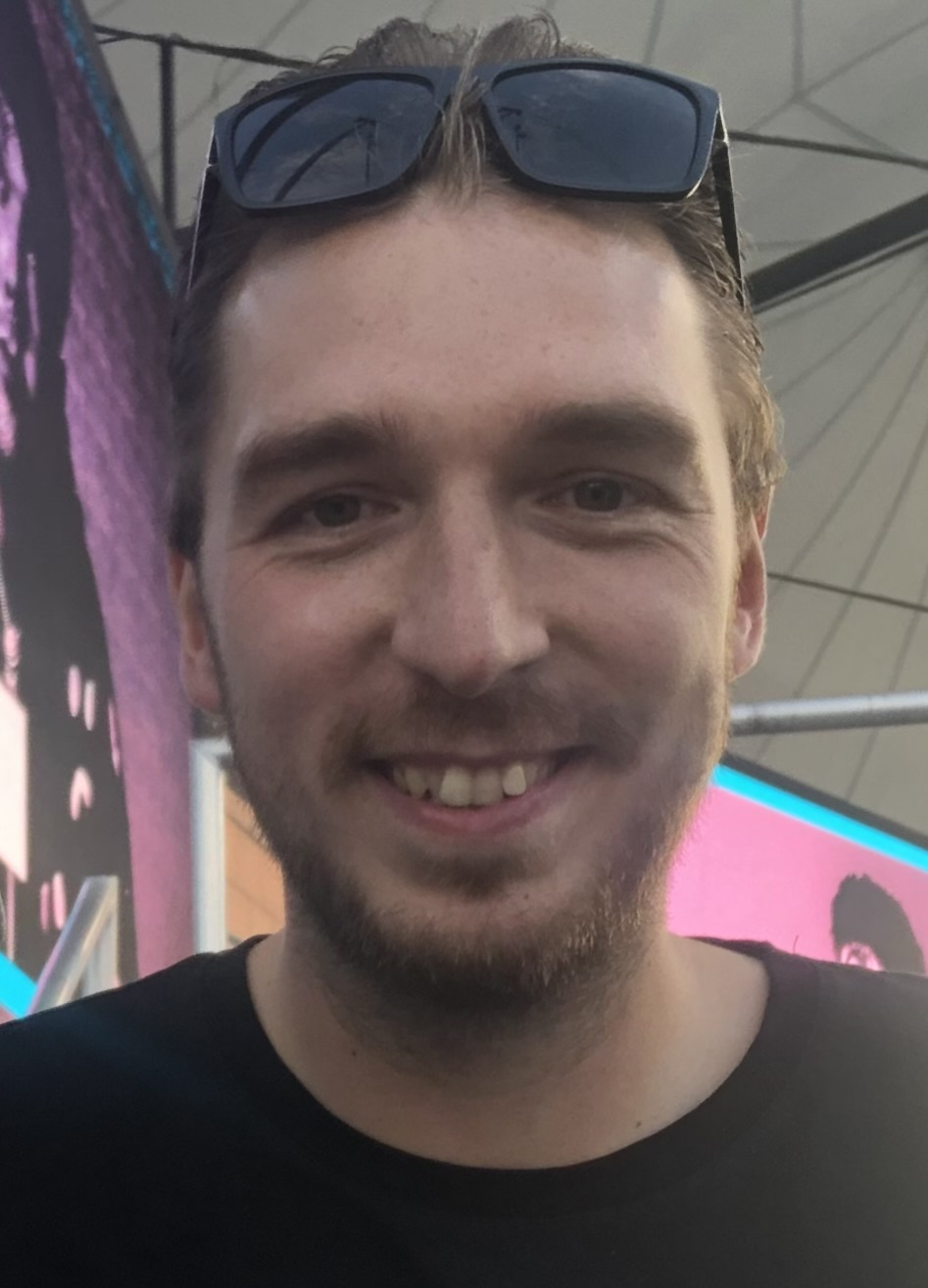
- LadBaby in 2022
- Born: Mark Ian Hoyle; 12 April 1987 (age 39); Nottingham, England
- Occupations: YouTuber; musician; blogger
- Years active: 2016–present
- Spouse: Roxanne Messenger (m. 2015)
- Children: 2

YouTube information
- Channel: LadBaby
- Genres: Life hacks, pranks, comedy, challenges (LadBaby); Toy testing, challenges (LadBaby & Sons)
- Subscribers: 1.14 million (LadBaby); 169 thousand (LadBaby & Sons)
- Views: 392.5 million (LadBaby); 15.5 million (LadBaby & Sons)
- Last updated: 24 October 2025

Mark Ian Hoyle (born 12 April 1987), known professionally as LadBaby, is an English YouTuber, musician, and blogger. His content focuses on his experiences as a father and is usually filmed in collaboration with his wife, Roxanne. The couple garnered the Christmas Number One on the UK Singles Chart for five years from 2018 to 2022, the most consecutive and overall for any artist, with the sausage roll–themed novelty songs "We Built This City", "I Love Sausage Rolls", "Don't Stop Me Eatin'", "Sausage Rolls for Everyone" and "Food Aid". This made them the first musical act in British history to secure five Christmas No. 1 hits, surpassing the record set by the Beatles, who had four Christmas No. 1 songs in 1963, 1964, 1965 and 1967.

== Career ==
=== Background and social media ===
Mark Ian Hoyle was born in Nottingham on 12 April 1987. He married Roxanne (née Messenger) in May 2015 after they eloped to Las Vegas. They reside in Nottingham and have two sons, Phoenix Forest (born 2016) and Kobe Notts (born 2018), with the names "Forest" and "Notts" in reference to Nottingham Forest F.C.. While Roxanne was pregnant with their first son, Mark created a blog named "LadBaby", reflecting on the fact that he "was a lad and [he] was having a baby". He used the blog to document his day-to-day life as a first-time parent. In October 2019 he signed deals with WME and MVE Management.

As of December 2020, the LadBaby YouTube channel, Facebook page, and Instagram account respectively have over 1 million subscribers, 4.9 million followers, and 1.3 million followers. LadBaby's video content, uploaded onto their Facebook and YouTube accounts, consists mainly of vlogs in which Mark demonstrates life hacks which help him to save money when faced with potentially costly parenting tasks. In June 2017, one vlog, in which he bought a toolbox from a hardware store to serve as a lunchbox for his son, went viral. Other creations by him include a baby walker made of pipes, a makeshift paddling pool made from a skip and a makeshift baby gate made from half of a door. Other viral videos include two uploaded in February 2018, when the Hoyle couple had each other's cars wrapped with love heart stickers and photographs of their faces. LadBaby is also known for the catchphrase "yes, mate!" which is often said in the videos. In October 2018, the Hoyles launched a spin-off YouTube channel, LadBaby & Sons, in which their sons take a more active role. The channel generally focuses on toy testing and kid-friendly social media challenges.

=== Charity singles ===
On 14 December 2018, the Hoyles released their charity single, a parody cover of Starship's 1985 single "We Built This City". The amended lyrics had a sausage roll theme with the refrain being changed to "We Built This City on Sausage Rolls". Proceeds from the charity single went to The Trussell Trust. The song debuted at number one on the UK Singles Chart, beating Ava Max's "Sweet but Psycho" and Ariana Grande's "Thank U, Next" to the 2018 Christmas number one, making the Hoyles the first British YouTubers to top the chart. It also appeared in Australia's ARIA Digital Track Chart and the US Hot Rock Songs chart peaking at No. 31 and No. 47 respectively.

On 13 December 2019, the Hoyles released a single entitled "I Love Sausage Rolls", a parody cover of Alan Merrill's "I Love Rock 'n' Roll". Nick Southwood co-wrote the new lyrics with the Hoyles, produced, mixed and performed bass and lead guitar. The single's cover is based on Abbey Road's cover. The song became the Christmas number one, beating the likes of Stormzy (No. 2), Lewis Capaldi (No. 3) and Dua Lipa (No. 4), and spent one week in the top 40. The couple were the third act to have two consecutive Christmas number one singles and the first to have two successive novelty Christmas number ones in the UK. On 27 December 2019, the record dropped from number 1 to number 57 and broke the record for the biggest ever drop from the top within the top 75 (as per The Guinness Book of British Hit Singles list, as "Three Lions" would have crashed out of the 'hit parade' by dropping to number 97 after it was number 1 in 2018). As with their previous single, proceeds went to The Trussell Trust. In a December 2019 interview with The Guardian, Hoyle declined to say who he had voted for at that month's general election; and when asked whether a government that introduced austerity would do anything to mitigate the issue of food poverty, he said the UK needed to have faith that the incoming Conservative government were "the right people", and said that "I'm sure they're gonna do a great job."

On 13 December 2020, the couple announced their new Christmas single entitled "Don't Stop Me Eatin'", a parody cover of "Don't Stop Believin'" by Journey (which had got to number 2 in the UK charts when it was covered by the Glee Cast). In the United Kingdom, its rivals in the race for the Christmas Number One were Russ Abbott's "Atmosphere", former chart toppers Justin Bieber and The Lewisham & Greenwich NHS Choir (teaming up for a version of Bieber's "Holy") and Liam Gallagher's "All You're Dreaming Of". Again, LadBaby's parody version of "Don't Stop Believin'" had a sausage roll theme, with proceeds going to The Trussell Trust, whilst the design of the single's sleeve parodied Queen's Bohemian Rhapsody.

On 21 December 2020, LadBaby released an additional duet version of "Don't Stop Me Eatin'", which featured Ronan Keating performing the song with Roxanne. On 22 December 2020, James Masterton (the chart analyst for Music Week) reported that the single had sold over 116,000 copies so far, a total which included both the original and the version with Ronan.

On 25 December 2020, Katie Thistleton on BBC Radio 1 revealed it was the number one for Christmas 2020. It sold 158,000 to top the chart and 94% of its total figure came from paid-for sales (downloads and CDs rather than streams). It was the fastest-selling single in the UK charts since another charity record, "Bridge Over Troubled Water" by Artists For Grenfell, topped the chart in June 2017. LadBaby became the third act to secure three consecutive Christmas number ones and one of the few acts to top the chart with their first three singles.

On 1 January 2021, "Don't Stop Me Eatin'" dropped down the Official Chart Company's singles chart to number 78 and so became the first new track to drop out of the Top 75 ('hit parade') from number one. In doing so, it broke the record for the shortest stay in the 'hit parade' for a number one single (as in The Guinness Book of British Hit Singles list of Top 75 singles chart records) with only one week in the Top 75.

In an interview with the Official Charts Company in 2021, LadBaby hit out at people buying rival Christmas single "Boris Johnson Is a Fucking Cunt" by Kunt and the Gang, saying "it takes a certain sort of person to download a song with that in the title", and falsely claimed the Kunts' single wasn't raising money for charity when donations were being made to Mind and Cardiac Risk in the Young.

In December 2021, LadBaby announced they were trying to get a fourth consecutive festive No. 1 by releasing a new Christmas single featuring Elton John and Ed Sheeran. Unlike their other parodies, the new song "Sausage Rolls For Everyone" is based on a 2021 song, "Merry Christmas", which became a chart-topper for featured artists Ed Sheeran and Elton John on the Official Singles Chart Top 100 on 10 December 2021 (week ending date 16 December 2021). Again, LadBaby found the new record up against songs from Wham! and Mariah Carey (both number one hits in the previous year), as well as singles by Adele and Gayle. In the same week, an acoustic version of "Sausage Rolls For Everyone" was released with The Food Bank Choir (rather than Sheeran and John). The acoustic version also came with a new video recorded at St Margaret's the Queen Church (as it is where the Norwood and Brixton Food Bank is located), featuring the Hoyles alongside stroke survivor Donna Kennedy and her 12-year-old son Ronan.

On 24 December 2021, LadBaby secured their fourth Christmas No. 1 in a row with a sales total of 136,445 (including 110,882 downloads and 4,898 CDs being sold), beating the original version of "Merry Christmas" by over 45,000 sales (with this number 2 getting a sales total of 90,508 in the end). On 31 December 2021, "Sausage Rolls For Everyone" was replaced at number one by the original "Merry Christmas", when it dropped to number 29 in the charts, managing a second week in the UK Top 40 and equalling the drop of 2015's "A Bridge over You" by the Lewisham and Greenwich NHS Choir, which once had the record-breaking fall from the top.

On 23 December 2022, "Food Aid" debuted at No. 1 on the chart, marking LadBaby's fifth consecutive Christmas No. 1.

Ladbaby also released a cover single of "Food Aid" with Bents Green School on 20 December 2022.

LadBaby chose to not release a single for Christmas 2023.

== Other ventures ==
In 2012, the couple took part in Channel 4's Hidden Talent. Trained by former champion freediver Emma Farrell, Roxanne was able to hold her breath underwater for four minutes and 18 seconds.

In June 2018, following an online public vote, Mark won Clas Ohlson's 2018 "Celebrity Dad of the Year" award, beating Prince William and others. Nine months later, Roxanne Hoyle won Clas Ohlson's 2019 "Celebrity Mum of the Year" award.

In November 2019, the Hoyle couple published a book titled Parenting for £1: ...And Other Baby Budget Hacks, in which they wrote about their life hacks.

In October 2020, Mark and Roxanne announced they had partnered with Walkers to create limited edition sausage roll-flavoured crisps, with five pence of the proceeds from each pack going to The Trussell Trust. In November 2020, the couple filmed a Walkers Christmas Ad.

In 2021, Roxanne released a collaboration clothing range with In the Style with most of the clothing aimed for mothers and women of all sizes. In July 2021, Roxanne and Mark released limited edition clothing for Euro 2020. In September 2021, the couple visited Greythorn Primary School, which Mark attended as a young child, to announce they had written a children's book, Greg the Sausage Roll: Santa's Little Helper, to be released in stores on 11 November 2021. They worked with Puffin Books, WHSmith, and the National Literacy Trust so that every time a book was pre-ordered or ordered from WHSmith, one book would be given to a child in the UK who does not have their own book. They also shared that they both have dyslexia. A couple of weeks later, Mark was nominated for a Pride of Britain Award for ITV Charity Fundraiser of the Year. In October 2021, Mark announced he was launching a Greg the Sausage Roll soft toy for Christmas. In November 2021, Mark and Roxanne began a book signing tour for Greg the Sausage Roll: Santa's Little Helper.

In November 2022, the couple released another book, Greg the Sausage Roll: The Perfect Present, which reached No. 1 on the Children's Bestseller List. In June 2023, they released Greg the Sausage Roll: Wish You Were Here, with Puffin giving £1 to the Trussell Trust for every hardback sold by WHSmith, up to a maximum of £10,000. The couple released their first board book in November 2023, titled Greg the Sausage Roll: 12 Days of Christmas which they described as being "more than just a book; it's a musical journey that's all about getting kids singing. Research has shown that rhyme and singing play a vital role in children's development, fostering coordination, imagination, concentration, memory, confidence with language, and a love for reading. Having experienced the joy of five Christmas number ones, we wanted to inspire the next generation of kids to start reading and celebrating the magic of Christmas through the power of song."

In February 2024, the couple released Greg the Sausage Roll: Egg-cellent Easter Adventure, with 50p being donated from every paperback copy sold via WHSmith to The Trussell Trust, up to a maximum of £10,000 until 31 December 2024. On the same month, they also released Greg the Sausage Roll: Lunchbox Superhero for World Book Day 2024. In celebration of National Rollercoaster Day on 16 August 2024, LadBaby partnered with Alton Towers Resort to promote the release of Greg the Sausage Roll: The World's Funniest Unicorn. During the two-day event, the Runaway Mine Train rollercoaster was renamed 'The Wonderland Express' in reference of the book, and meet-and-greets with the couple and characters from the book were held.

In September 2024, Ladbaby partnered with Format Games to create and launch a family-friendly board game named Sausage Roll!. The couple said about the board game: "We're thrilled to merge our love for sausage rolls with Format Games' expertise in board games, to deliver our very own sausage roll-themed game. Prepare for the fun and excitement of our viral videos, now delivered straight to your living room for family enjoyment all year long. Note: Sausage roll included, but it’s not edible!" Matt Edmondson, Co-Founder of Format Games, added: "Working with LadBaby to bring their infectious sense of humour to life in a board game has been an absolute blast. We wanted Sausage Roll to be as fun and light-hearted as the LadBaby brand itself, creating a game that would bring families together for a lot of laughs. From the quirky gameplay to the silly challenges, we've poured all of our creativity into designing something that's truly unique, and we can't wait to see people enjoying it this festive season."

== Discography ==
=== Singles ===
List of singles, with selected chart positions
Title	Year	Peak chart positions						Album
Title	Year	UK	AUS	IRE	NZ Hot	SCO	US Rock	Album
"We Built This City"	2018	1	— (Note: "We Built This City" did not enter the ARIA Singles Chart, but peaked at number 31 on the ARIA Digital Track Chart.)	—	—	1	47	Non-album singles
"I Love Sausage Rolls"	2019	1	100	59	20	1	10	Non-album singles
"Don't Stop Me Eatin'" (solo or with Ronan Keating)	2020	1	64	93	12	—	28	Non-album singles
"Sausage Rolls for Everyone" (featuring Ed Sheeran and Elton John)	2021	1	48	41	7	—	—	Non-album singles
"Food Aid" (solo or featuring Bents Green School)	2022	1	—	—	38	—	—	Non-album singles
"—" denotes items which were not released in that country or failed to chart.
