= Mas (surname) =

- Frequency of the surname Mas in Spain.
- Pronunciation: Mas
- Language: Catalan and Occitan or Low German and Dutch

Origin
- Meaning: farmstead or from a short form of Thomas
- Region of origin: Spain, France, Germany and Netherlands

Other names
- Variant forms: de Mas, du Mas, Delmas, Dumas, Maas, Mass, Thomas

Mas (Catalan: [ˈmas], Occitan: [ˈmas]) is a surname of Catalan and Occitan or North German and Dutch origin. It accounts for 0.068% of the population in Spain, with 0.879% found amongst Catalans, and 0.017% in France.

== Origin and meaning ==
- Catalan and Occitan: topographic name for someone who lived in an isolated dwelling in the country, rather than in a village, from Catalan and Occitan mas 'farmstead' (Late Latin mansum, mansus).
- North German and Dutch: from a short form of Thomas. Compare Maas and Mass.

== People ==
- Alejandro Bofill Mas (born 1960), Catalan chess player and FIDE international master
- Alexandre Mas, Catalan-American economist
- Alphonse Mas (1817–1875), French President of the French Pomological Society and Ain Horticultural Society
- Álvaro Mas (born 1992), Spanish footballer
- André Boyer-Mas (1904–1972), French cleric and diplomat
- Andreu Mas-Colell (born 1944), Catalan economist
- Anna Genover-Mas (born 1963), Catalan journalist and writer of children's books
- Antoni Colom Mas (born 1978), Catalan cyclist
- Antoni Mas Fornés (born 1968), historian and writer
- Antoni Mas i Borràs, Knight of the Order of Montesa
- Arcadi Mas i Fondevila (1852–1934), Catalan painter and artist and founder of the Sitges Luminista School
- Artur Mas (born 1956), Catalan politician
- Bernat Mas "des Plá del Rey", knighted for his service to King John II of Castile in the wars against the Prince of Vienna
- Carlos Mas Samora (born 1957), Catalan former all-terrain motorcyclist
- Carolyne Mas (born 1955), American singer-songwriter, guitarist, pianist and producer
- Enric Mas (1995), Spanish cyclist
- Ezequiel González Mas (1919–2007), Spanish historian
- Father Vicente Mas, member of the Carthusian Order
- Francesc Joan Mas (1522–?), Catalan philosopher
- Francesc Mas i Ros (1901–1985), Catalan composer
- Francis Mas (1936–2006), French rugby player
- Gabriel Mas Arbona (born 1933), Catalan cyclist
- Guillem Mas, among those who formed the "Sixteen" in 1521
- Isidro Más de Ayala (1899–1960), Uruguayan psychiatrist and author
- Jaume Mas "des Plá del Rey", alderman of the municipality of Palma
- Jaume Mas, Bishop of Vic (1674–1684)
- Jean-Baptiste Charles Mas de Polart (1775–1843), French General and Lieutenant General
- Jeanne Mas (born 1958), Catalan born French pop singer and actress
- Joan Mas (born 1934), Catalan post-impressionist painter
- Joan Mas i Bauzà (1928–1992), Catalan writer
- Joan Mas i Cantí, Catalan economist
- Joan Mas i Ramon (born 1932), Catalan postimpressionist painter
- Joan Mas i Vives (born 1951), Catalan literary critic, author and philologist
- Jorge Mas Canosa (1939–1997), Cuban-American activist
- Jorge Mas, Cuban-American businessman, son of Jorge Mas Canosa
- Josep Moragues i Mas (1669–1715), Catalan General who fought in the War of Spanish Succession
- Josep Vicenç Foix i Mas (1893–1987), Catalan poet, journalist and essayist
- Juan Vicente Mas Quiles (1921–2021), Catalan orchestra and band conductor and composer
- Lluís Mas i Borràs, Knight of the Order of Montesa
- Lluís Mas i Ossó (1908–1984), Catalan athlete and politician
- Lluís Mas i Pons (1903–1975), Catalan lawyer, teacher, poet and writer
- Manuel Mas Ribó (1946–2001), former foreign minister of Andorra
- Miguel Mas (born 1967), Argentinian actor, producer, director and screenwriter
- Miquel Mas Ferrà (born 1950), Catalan writer
- Miquel Mas Gayà (born 1943), Catalan cycling world champion
- Nicolas Mas (born 1980), French player for the French rugby union team
- Nicolas Mas-Castellane (died 1586), French Huguenot General in the French Wars of Religion
- Núria Mas (born 1973), Spanish economist and professor
- Oscar Más (born 1946), Argentine former football striker
- Pere Sampol Mas (1951–2025), Catalan technical engineer in the electronics industry
- Regino Más i Marí (1899–1968), Catalan Falles artist
- Roger Mas (1931–2009), French politician
- Salvador Mas i Conde (born 1951), Catalan conductor and musical and artistic director of the City of Granada Orchestra
- Sergi Mas y Abad (born 1964), Catalan actor and journalist
- Sergi Mas, Andorran sculptor, designer, illustrator, painter, engraver, lithographer and writer
- Sinibaldo de Mas (1809–1868), Catalan sinologist, painter, calligrapher, writer, ambassador, adventurer, photography pioneer, and Spanish government diplomat to Asia during the 19th century
- Teodoro de Mas y Nadal (1858–1936), Catalan engineer and politician

== See also ==
- Mas (disambiguation)
