= Maessen =

Maessen or Maesen is a Dutch patronymic surname, meaning son of Maes, an archaic short form of Thomas. It is most common in Dutch Limburg and surrounding regions. Among variant forms are Maas, Maase(n), Maassen, and Maes. Notable people with the surname include:

- Barry Maessen (born 1976), Dutch racing driver
- Bianca Maessen (born 1950), Dutch pop singer, sister of Patricia and Stella
- Bob Maesen (born 1976), Belgian sprint canoer
- Liv Maessen, Australian singer active 1969–1974
- Patricia Maessen (1952–1996), Dutch pop singer, sister of Bianca and Stella
- Stella Maessen (born 1953), Dutch pop singer, sister of Bianca and Patricia

== See also ==
- Léontine de Maësen (1835–1906), Belgian coloratura soprano
- Paul Therèse van der Maesen de Sombreff (1827–1902), Dutch nobleman, Minister of Foreign Affairs 1864–66
- Edmé-Martin Vandermaesen (1767–1813), French general of the French Revolutionary and Napoleonic Wars.
