= Maass =

Maass or Maaß is a German surname. People with this surname include:

- Clara Maass (1876–1901), American nurse
- David Maaß (born 1984), German politician
- G. F. H. Maass (1830–1901), German botanist
- Gustav Maass (1893–1964), American architect
- Hans Maass (1911–1992), German mathematician
- Hermann Maaß (1897–1944), resistance fighter
- Johann Maass (1766–1823), German psychologist
- Leberecht Maass (1863–1914), German admiral
- Peter Maass (born 1960), American journalist
- Otto Maass (1890–1961), Canadian chemist
- Verena Butalikakis (née Maass; 1955–2018), German politician

== See also ==
- Mas (disambiguation)
- Maas (disambiguation)
- Maß
- Maes (disambiguation)
- Maus
