= Mizell =

Mizell may refer to:

== Surname ==
- Aidan Mizell, American football player
- Beth Mizell, (born 1952), businesswoman from Franklinton, Louisiana, member of the Louisiana State Senate
- Cameron Mizell (born 1983), American record producer, owner of Chango Studios in Lake Mary, Florida and Phoenix, Arizona
- Cody Mizell (born 1991), American soccer player
- Hank Mizell (1923–1992), American singer, guitarist and songwriter
- Jason Mizell (1965–2002), American musician and DJ known by his stage name Jam Master Jay, of Run-DMC
- Von Delany Mizell, the second black physician in Fort Lauderdale, Florida
- Warner Mizell (1907–1971), American football player
- Wilmer Mizell (1930–1999), American left-handed baseball pitcher and U.S. congressman
- Zac Mizell, American rugby union player for the Ohio Aviators in PRO Rugby
- Mizell Brothers, record producing team in the 1970s, consisting of Larry and Alphonso "Fonce" Mizell

== Given name ==
- Andrew Mizell Burton (1879–1966), American businessman and philanthropist
- Mizell Wilson (1897–1968), lieutenant and lawyer, the son of Felix Zollicoffer Wilson

== Others ==
- Barber-Mizell feud in Brevard and Orange counties, Florida in 1870 resulting in 41 deaths
- Mizell-Leu House Historic District, Leu Botanical Gardens and Leu House Museum in Orlando, Florida, United States

== See also ==
- Mariazell
- Mize (disambiguation)
- Zell (disambiguation)
