= Macif (disambiguation) =

Macif is a French mutual insurance company

Macif or MACIF may also refer to:

- MACIF (Figaro 2), a 2005 Bénéteau Figaro 2 monohull sailing yacht
- IMOCA 60 Macif, a 2011 IMOCA 60 monohull sailing yacht
- Macif (trimaran), a 2015 maxi-trimaran
- IMOCA 60 Macif 3 , a 2023 IMOCA 60 monohull sailing yacht that won the 2023 Fastnet Race

== See also ==
- Massif (disambiguation)
