= Ludwig Schneider =

Ludwig Schneider may refer to:

- Ludwig Schneider (wrestler), German wrestler
- Ludwig Karl Eduard Schneider, German politician and botanist
- Louis Schneider (actor) (Ludwig Wilhelm Schneider), German actor and author
