= Maas =

Maas, MAAS or MaaS may refer to:

== People ==
- Maas (surname), including a list of people with the name
- Maas Thajoon Akbar (1880–1944), a Ceylonese judge and lawyer
- Thomas Samuel Swartwout (nicknamed Maas; 1660–1723), one of the earliest settlers of the Delaware River Valley

== Places ==
- Maas, Syria
- Maghas, or Maas, the capital of Alania, a medieval kingdom in the Greater Caucasus
- Meuse, or Maas, a river in the Low Countries and France

== Other uses ==
- Museum of Applied Arts & Sciences, in Sydney, Australia, incorporating the Powerhouse Museum, Sydney Observatory and the Museums Discovery Centre
- Muslim Association for the Advancement of Science, association of Muslim scientists
- Mobility as a service (MaaS), a shift from personally-owned transport to mobility consumed as a service
- Monitoring as a service (MaaS), a cloud computing delivery model
- MAAS, a bare-metal server provisioning tool from Canonical
- Amasi, or Maas, a thick-curdled sour fermented milk from South Africa
- Maas_Brothers

== See also ==
- Mass (disambiguation)
- Maes (disambiguation)
- Maass, a German surname
- Mace (surname)
