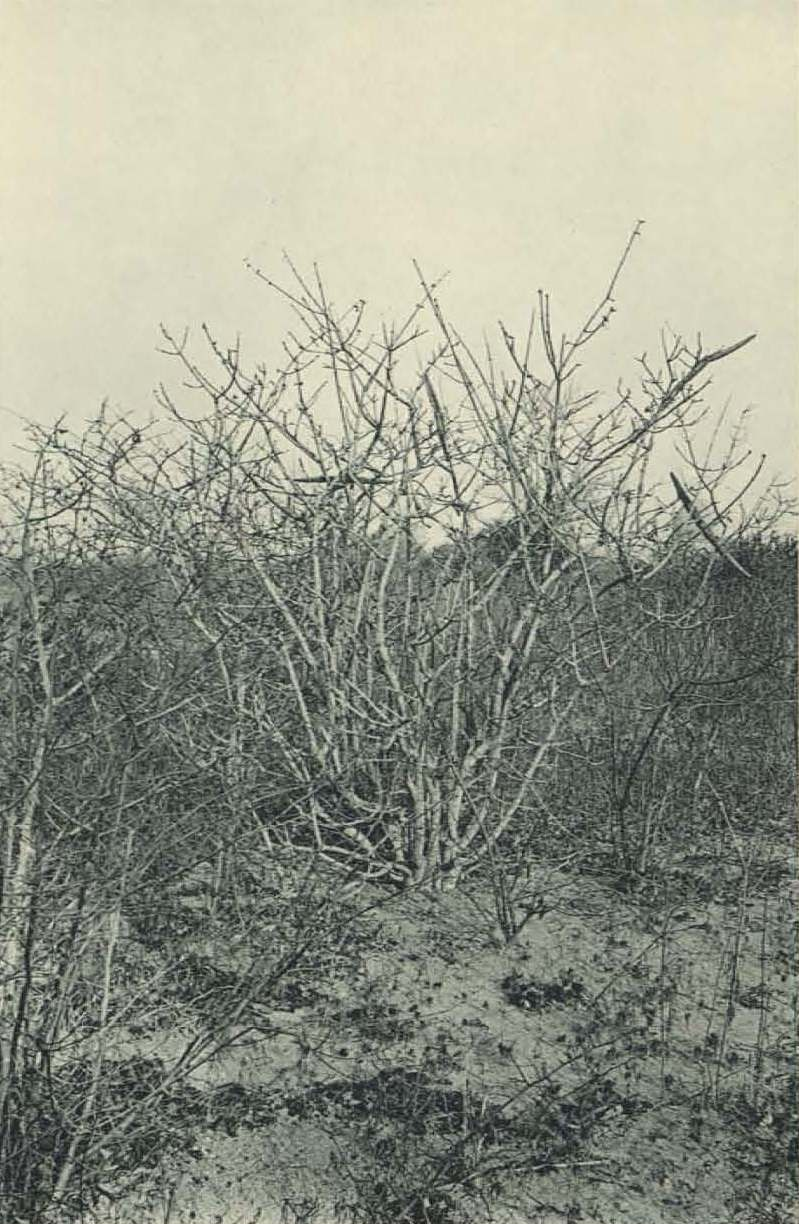

Scientific classification
- Kingdom: Plantae
- Clade: Embryophytes
- Clade: Tracheophytes
- Clade: Spermatophytes
- Clade: Angiosperms
- Clade: Eudicots
- Clade: Asterids
- Order: Gentianales
- Family: Apocynaceae
- Genus: Strophanthus
- Species: S. eminii

Binomial name
- Strophanthus eminii Asch. ex Pax

Synonyms
- Strophanthus fischeri Asch. & K.Schum ex Franch.; Strophanthus wittei Staner

= Strophanthus eminii =

Species of flowering plant

Strophanthus eminii is a species of flowering plant in the Apocynaceae family. It is referred to by the common name Emin's strophanthus, and grows as a liana up to 10 metres (33 ft) long or as a shrub or small tree up to 7 metres (23 ft) tall, with a stem diameter up to 6 centimetres (2.4 in). Its fragrant flowers feature a pink with white turning red corolla tube, white turning yellow with red spots and streaks inside. Vernacular names for the plant include "spider tresses" and "poison arrow vine". Its habitat is deciduous woodland or rocky bushland, from 600 metres (2,000 ft) to 1,650 metres (5,400 ft) altitude. Strophanthus eminii is used in local medicinal treatments for snakebites, skin diseases and wounds and also as an anthelmintic. The plant has been used as arrow poison. It is native to Democratic Republic of Congo, Tanzania and Zambia.
