= Xmas (disambiguation) =

Xmas is an abbreviation for Christmas.

Xmas or variant, may also refer to:

- Christmas, a Christian holiday
- X MAS, the Decima Flottiglia MAS, a frogman unit of the Italian military
- Xmas ("eks-mas"), a fictional holiday from Futurama first shown in "Xmas Story"
- Xmas (film), a 2015 film
- X-Mas (EP), a 2014 record by Stevie Ann
- X-Mas: The Metal Way, a 1994 record by Paul Di'Anno
- "X-Mas 1", an episode of Pucca
- "X-Mas 2", an episode of Pucca
- "XMAS", a Christmas song by Kylie Minogue which topped the UK charts in 2025

== See also ==
- X-Mass Festival, a European music festival
- "Xmas Story", a 1999 season 2 episode 4 of Futurama
- "Xmas Day" (song), a 2001 song by 'Sevendust' off the album Animosity
- ZE Xmas Record, the CD version of the 1981 LP A Christmas Record
- The Xmas EP, a 2013 record by Never Shout Never
- "This X-Mas", a 2017 song by Chris Brown from Heartbreak on a Full Moon
- Christmas (disambiguation)
- XMA (disambiguation)
- mas (disambiguation)
