= Cresconius Africanus =

Cresconius Africanus (Crisconius) was a Latin canon lawyer, of uncertain date and place. He flourished, probably, in the latter half of the 7th century. He was probably a Christian bishop of the African Church.

== Concordia canonum ==
Cresconius made a collection of canons, known as Concordia canonum, inclusive of the Apostolic Canons, nearly all the canons of the fourth- and fifth-century councils, and many papal decretals from the end of the fourth to the end of the fifth century. It was much used as a handy manual of ecclesiastical legislation by the churches of Africa and Gaul as late as the tenth century. Few of its manuscripts postdate that period.

The content is taken from the collection of Dionysius Exiguus, but the division into titles (301) is copied from the Breviatio canonum of Fulgentius Ferrandus, a sixth-century deacon of Carthage. In many manuscripts the text of Cresconius is preceded by an index or table of contents (breviarium) of the titles, first edited in 1588 by Pithou.

In its entirety the work was first published by Voellus and Justellus. One of its best manuscripts, the tenth-century Vallicellianus (Rome), has a note in which Cresconius is declared the author of a metrical poem called "Bella et victorias" by the "Patricius" Johannes in Africa about the Saracens. This was formerly interpreted to mean the African victory of the Byzantine Patricius Johannes in 697, hence the usual date of Cresconius. Some, however, hold that the poem in question is the Johannis of Flavius Cresconius Corippus, a Latin poet of about 550, and on this basis identify him with the canonist, thus placing the latter in the sixth century. Others (with Maassen, p. 810) while admitting that the poem in question can be none other than the Johannis of the aforesaid Latin poet (unknown to Fabricius, and first edited by Samuel Mazzuchelli, Milan, 1820), maintain that it has been wrongly attributed to this Cresconius, and that it cannot therefore aid in fixing his date.
