= Maassen =

Maassen is a Dutch patronymic surname, meaning son of Maas, an archaic short form of Thomas. It is most common in Dutch Limburg and surrounding regions. Among variant forms are Maas, Maase(n), Maasse, Maes, and Maessen. In Germany the name is usually spelled Maaßen. Notable people with the surname include:

- Frans Maassen (born 1965), Dutch racing cyclist and directeur sportif
- Friedrich Maassen (1823–1900), German jurist
- Hans Maassen, (born 1951) a Dutch mathematical physicist
- Lambert Maassen (1941–2018), Dutch football forward
- Montego Maassen (born 2007), German racing driver
- Nol Maassen (1922–2009), Dutch politician
- Peter Maassen (1810–1890), German entomologist
- Peter J. Maassen (born 1955), American jurist of the Alaska Supreme Court
- Sascha Maassen (born 1969), German racing driver
- Theo Maassen (born 1966), Dutch comedian and actor
- Wolfgang Maassen (born 1949), German philatelist
- Xavier Maassen (born 1980), Dutch racing driver
- Stephen Maassen (born 1957), Wisconsinite physician

Maaßen

- Hanns Maaßen (1908–1983), German journalist and writer
- Hans-Georg Maaßen (born 1962), German politician and lawyer
- Karl Georg Maaßen (1769–1834), Prussian jurist and politician

Maase

- Kamiel Maase (born 1971), Dutch long-distance runner
- Maase (noble family), Danish noble family

== See also ==
- Maasen, a community in Lower Saxony, Germany
