= These Alarms =

2026 single by Snow Patrol and Kylie Minogue

- Remix bundle artwork

Single by Snow Patrol and Kylie Minogue
- Released: 1 July 2026
- Genre: Synth pop; Pop rock
- Length: 3:22
- Label: BMG
- Songwriters: Gary Lightbody; Nathan Connolly; Johnny McDaid; Fraser T. Smith; Roy Kerr
- Producers: T. Smith; Lightbody

Snow Patrol singles chronology
"The Only Noise" (2025)	"These Alarms" (2026)

Kylie Minogue singles chronology
"XMAS" (2025)	"These Alarms" (2026)	"Love Sensation" (afterhours mix) (2026)

Music video
- "These Alarms" on YouTube

"These Alarms" is a song by the Northern Irish rock band Snow Patrol and Australian singer Kylie Minogue. It was released on 1 July 2026, through BMG Records.

== Background and release ==
The song, written by the band members Roy Kerr, Fraser T. Smith, Nathan Connolly, Johnny McDaid and Gary Lightbody, had been planned to be included on Snow Patrol's album The Forest Is the Path (2024). Once the song was finished, the band realized that Kylie's vocals were the missing element and invited her to participate in the recording. Later, they decided not to include it on the album, preferring that the song have its own identity and follow its own path.

== Music Video ==
The official music video of the song was published through the band's YouTube channel on July 16, 2026. It was directed by Robbie Kilgour and recorded during Snow Patrol and Minogue's performance of the single during the band concert at Crystal Palace Park in London on 3 July 2026.

== Release history ==
Release dates and formats
Region	Date	Format(s)	Version(s)	Label	Ref.
Various	1 July 2026	Digital download; streaming	Original	BMG	
Italy	1 July 2026	Radio airplay	Original	BMG	
