= Maes =

Maes may refer to:

== People ==
- Maes (surname), a surname (with a list of articles concerning the bearers)
- Maes (rapper) (born 1995), a French rapper of Moroccan origin
- Maes Titianus, an ancient Roman traveler of Macedonian culture
- Maes Hughes, a fictional character in Hiromu Arakawa's manga and anime series Fullmetal Alchemist

== Others ==
- Maes, usually the site of a Welsh eisteddfod
- Maes Knoll, an Iron Age hill fort in Somerset, England
- Alken-Maes, a Belgian brewery
  - Maes pils, a Belgian beer brewed by Alken-Maes
- Society of Mexican American Engineers and Scientists (MAES)
- Victorian Multicultural Awards for Excellence (MAEs)

== See also ==
- Maesteg, a town and community in Wales
- Maas
