= XM4 =

XM4 may refer to:

- XM-4 Blues, a satellite operated by XM satellite radio
- XM 4, a radio channel from Sirus XM satellite radio; see List of Sirius XM Radio channels
- South African type XM4 tender, a steam locomotive tender
- Moller XM-4, a VTOL aircraft; see List of aircraft (Mo)
- Lipán XM4, a variant of the Argentine drone Lipán M3; see List of unmanned aerial vehicles
- XM4, a prototype version of the M4 carbine
- XM4 rocket launcher U.S. helicopter armament subsystems

== See also ==
- XMA (disambiguation)
- XM (disambiguation)
