= Mas =

Mas, Más or MAS may refer to:

== Film and TV ==
- Más y Menos, fictional superhero characters, from the Teen Titans animated television series
- "Más" (Breaking Bad), a season three episode of Breaking Bad

== Music ==
=== Albums ===
- Más (album), by Alejandro Sanz, 1997
- Más, by Magneto, 1993

=== Songs ===
- "Más" (Nelly Furtado song), 2009
- "Más" (Ricky Martin song), 2011
- "+ (Más)", by Aitana and Cali y El Dandee, 2019
- "Más", by Cazzu, 2017
- "Más", by Juanes from Vida Cotidiana, 2023
- "Más", by José José from Promesas, 1985
- "Más", by Kinky from Kinky, 2002
- "Más", by Selena Gómez from For You, 2014

== Computing ==
- MAS 90, Sage accounting software
- Motu Audio System, now Digital Performer, audio sequencer software
- Multi-agent system, built of multiple interacting agents
- Malware Analysis System by FireEye
- Microsoft Activation Scripts, open-source Windows and Office license activators

== Education ==
- Master of Advanced Studies, an academic degree
- Master of Advanced Study, a professional degree
- Master of Applied Science, a professional degree
- Master of Archival Studies, a professional degree
- Mescalero Apache Schools
- Macarthur Anglican School

== Military ==
- MAS (motorboat), Italian motor torpedo boats
- Manufacture d'armes de Saint-Étienne, a French government arms factory
  - MAS-49 rifle, a French semiautomatic rifle manufactured by them

== Organizations ==
- Malaysia Airlines, flag carrier of Malaysia
- Muerte a Secuestradores (Death to Kidnappers), a Colombian paramilitary group
- Football Association of Malaysia, by FIFA report code
- Mongolian Academy of Sciences, a Mongolian college
- Municipal Art Society, an urban planning organization based in New York City
- Muslim American Society, an Islamic revival and reform movement
- Macarthur Astronomical Society, a non-profit organization based in Sydney, Australia
- Maghreb Association Sportive de Fès, a Moroccan football club colloquially referred to by the acronym MAS
- Monetary Authority of Singapore, Singapore's central bank
- Museum aan de Stroom, museum in the city of Antwerp
- Museo de Arte Moderno y Contemporáneo de Santander y Cantabria, art museum in Santander, Spain
- Mujeres en Acción Solidaria, a Mexican feminist organization

== Places ==
- Mas de las Matas, Aragón, Spain

== Politics ==
- Movement for Socialism (Argentina) (Movimiento al Socialismo), an Argentine political party
- Mouvement pour une Alternative Socialiste (Movement for a Socialist Alternative), a Belgian Trotskyist organization
- Movement toward Socialism (Bolivia) (Movimiento al Socialismo), a Bolivian political party
- Broad Social Movement (Movimiento Amplio Social), a Chilean political party
- Socialist Alternative Movement (Movimento Alternativa Socialista), a Portuguese Trotskyist political party
- Movement toward Socialism (Venezuela) (Movimiento al Socialismo), a Venezuelan political party

== Biology ==
- Macrophage activation syndrome, a potentially life-threatening complication of several chronic rheumatic diseases of childhood
- The G protein-coupled receptor Mas, a critical part of the renin–angiotensin–aldosterone system (RAAS), encoded by the proto-oncogene MAS1
- Mandibular advancement splint, a device used to treat sleep apnea
- Marker assisted selection, a genome-tagging technique
- Meconium aspiration syndrome, neonatal aspiration of meconium
- McCune–Albright syndrome, a genetic disorder which results in precocious puberty
- Mixed amphetamine salts, an abridged generic name for Adderall, a stimulant drug

== Metrics ==
- Milliampere second (mAs), a fraction of an ampere hour, a unit of electric charge
- Milliarcseconds (mas), a unit of angular measurement
- Magic-angle spinning, a technique used in solid state nuclear magnetic resonance spectroscopy

== Transport ==
- Chennai Central railway station, code MAS
- MASKargo, a Malaysian cargo airline
- Mas Air, a cargo airline based in Mexico City

== People ==
- Mas (surname), a surname
- Mas (Swedish term)
- MAS (band)
- Marco Antonio Solís, name abbreviation

== Other uses ==
- Malaysia, IOC country code
- Marshall Islands, UNDP country code
- Mas, short for masquerade, traditional Carnival costumes; see List of Trinidad and Tobago Carnival character costumes
- Mas (Provençal farmhouse)
- MÄS, a restaurant in Ashland, Oregon, United States
- Mas (restaurant), New York City
- Más+, a brand of beverages founded by Lionel Messi
- Mutual Admiration Society (disambiguation), various uses

== See also ==
- Mezzi d'Assalto, (Assault Vehicle), in the unit name Decima Flottiglia MAS
- Xmas (disambiguation)
