= Gustav Maass =

German botanist (1830–1901)

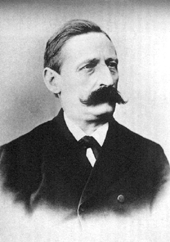
Gustav Maass (1830–1901)

Gustav Friedrich Hermann Maass (2 December 1830 – 28 April 1901) was a German botanist who was a native of Brandenburg an der Havel.

In 1848, he became an assistant to agriculturalist Hermann von Nathusius (1809–1879); further, from late 1849, he spent twelve-plus years in the military as an artilleryman in the 3rd Brandenburg Artillery Brigade, as a Brigadeschule instructor at Magdeburg and as an assistant to the brigade staff in Berlin. In 1862, he became a manager in the Magdeburgischen Land-Feuer-Societät in Altenhausen, a position he maintained until his death in 1901.

In 1866, Maass was co-founder of the Walbeck "Aller Association", and was its chairman from 1874 to 1896. Within this association, he carried out extensive studies of flora found in areas surrounding the Ohre and Aller Rivers. With Paul Ascherson (1834–1913) and Ludwig Schneider (1809–1889), he took part in extended botanical excursions. Results from these field studies were incorporated into Schneider's book Flora von Magdeburg.

Maass is credited with discovering several new species of blackberry, and for providing assistance to Wilhelm Olbers Focke (1834–1922) with the latter's 1877 treatise Synopsis Ruborum Germaniae. Also, the botanical species Rubus maassii is named in Maass' honor.

Increasingly, from the mid-1880s, he combined his botanical trips with historical research, in particular investigations of megaliths and other prehistoric monuments, as well as studies of ancient villages and forts.

== Publications ==
- Rubus glaucovirens. Eine neue Magdeburgische Brombeere, in Abhandlungen des Botanischen Vereins der Provinz Brandenburg, 162ff., 1870 – "Rubus glaucovirens". A new blackberry of Magdeburg.
- Die Wüstungen des Kreises Neuhaldensleben, 1899 – The deserted villages of the district Neuhaldensleben.
