= Massif (disambiguation) =

A massif is a principal mountain mass.

Massif may also refer to:

== Places ==
=== Geography ===
- Massif Central, a highland region of Southern France
- Massif du Nord, a mountain range in Haiti
- Mount Massif, a mountain in Tasmania, Australia

=== Ski areas ===
- Grand Massif, a ski resort located in Haute-Savoie, France
- Le Massif, a ski resort located in Charlevoix, Quebec, Canada
- Massif du Sud, a ski resort located in Quebec, Canada

== Other uses ==
- Iveco Massif, a utility 4x4 vehicle
- Valgrind Massif, a heap profiler tool

== See also ==
- Mass (disambiguation)
- Massive (disambiguation)
- Mount (disambiguation)
- Mountain (disambiguation)
- Mountain range
