= List of UK singles chart Christmas number ones =

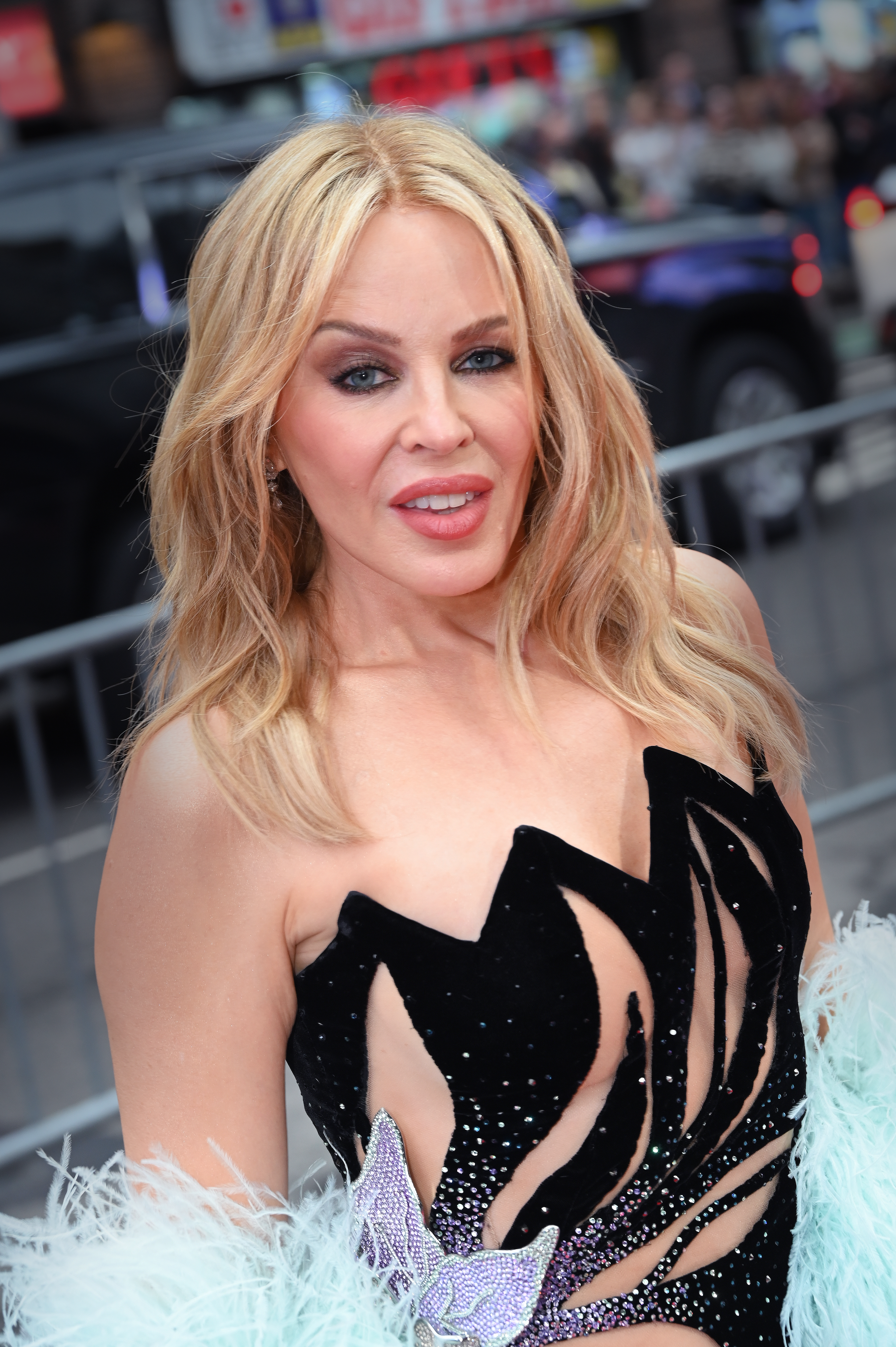
Kylie Minogue's "XMAS" was the 2025 Christmas number one.

In the United Kingdom, Christmas number ones are singles that top the UK singles chart in the week preceding or during Christmas Day. They have often been novelty songs, charity songs or songs with a Christmas theme. Historically, the volume of record sales in the UK has peaked at Christmas.

Christmas number-one singles have often been the best-selling song of the year. During the 21st century many Christmas chart-toppers have been either by reality television contestants or charity singles. The Christmas number one is announced by BBC Radio 1 on the Friday before Christmas. The most recent Christmas number-one single is "XMAS" by Kylie Minogue.

== History ==
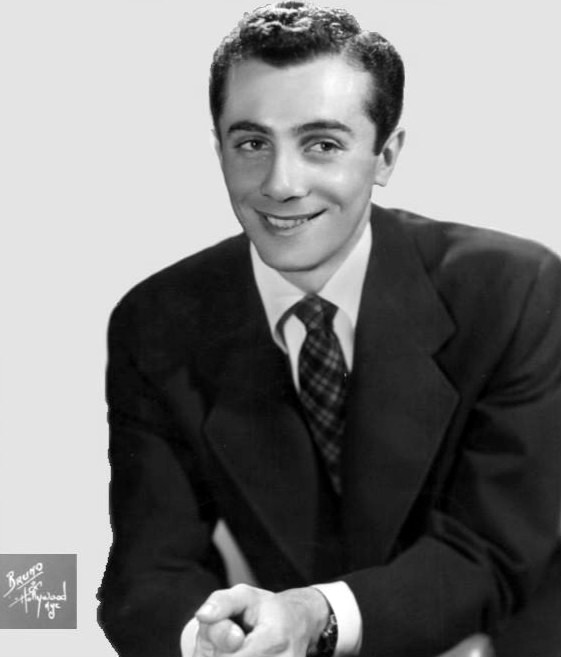
Al Martino was the first person to reach Christmas number one, in 1952.

The UK Singles Chart began in 1952 – appearing in the New Musical Express. The positions of all songs are based on weekly sales (from Sunday to Saturday until 2015, then from Friday to Thursday). Before 1987, they were released on a Tuesday due to the need for manual calculation. The emergence of a serious contest for the Christmas number-one spot began in 1973, when the glam rock bands Slade and Wizzard deliberately released festive songs in an effort to reach the top of the charts at Christmas, with Slade's "Merry Xmas Everybody" beating Wizzard's "I Wish It Could Be Christmas Everyday". The Christmas number-one single was not revealed on Christmas Day itself until 1994.

From 2002 until 2014, the competition for the Christmas number one was dominated by reality television contests, with the winners often heading straight to number one in the week before Christmas. This trend began when Popstars: The Rivals contestants released the top three singles on the Christmas chart. (Note: In addition to the two groups that were the focus of the show (Girls Aloud and One True Voice), who charted at No. 1 and No. 2 respectively, the No. 3 on the chart was "Cheeky Song (Touch My Bum)" by The Cheeky Girls, who had also been contestants on Popstars.) Between 2005 and 2014, the winners of The X Factor took the number-one spot on seven occasions. In 2007, the X Factor single was such a strong favourite for number one that bookmakers began taking bets on which song would be the "Christmas Number Two" instead. Rage Against the Machine's 1992 single "Killing in the Name" outsold Joe McElderry in 2009 following a successful Facebook campaign against this trend. This made them the first group to get a Christmas number one with a download-only single, and resulted in the most download sales in a single week in UK chart history. Similar campaigns in 2010 promoting acts such as Biffy Clyro, John Cage and the Trashmen were unsuccessful.

In 2011, the Military Wives and Gareth Malone, both involved with the reality television show The Choir, outsold X Factor winners Little Mix and a host of social network campaigns for various novelty acts. In 2012, a supergroup cover of "He Ain't Heavy, He's My Brother", supporting charities associated with the Hillsborough disaster, reached the number one ahead of The X Factor's James Arthur. Following the UK Charts' move to Fridays, the Christmas number one is revealed on Christmas Day whenever it falls on a Friday, such as in 2015 and 2020; the former year's chart was the first in a decade to not feature the X Factor winner's single in the top two. Amazon Music has released a number of exclusive festive tracks since 2018, recorded with acts such as Justin Bieber, Jess Glynne, and Ellie Goulding, none of which have topped the Christmas chart, though Goulding's track later reached number one. More recently, non-traditional acts have been successful with novelty songs released for charity; most notably, YouTubers LadBaby achieved number one every year between 2018 and 2022, each time raising money for the Trussell Trust, before voluntarily ending their streak by not releasing a Christmas single in 2023.

"Last Christmas", a single by Wham! originally released in 1984, became the first single to become Christmas number one in two consecutive years. This was largely due to changes in the compilation process that granted heavier favour toward streaming, which allowed perennial seasonal records to re-enter the charts and effectively ensured that older records would be the favourites for the Christmas number one chart.

== Records ==
LadBaby is the act with the most Christmas number ones with five, surpassing the Beatles' previous record in 2022. On two occasions, in 1963 and 1967, the Beatles had both the Christmas number one and the number two, the first act to have achieved this. As part of two acts, George Michael repeated the feat with Band Aid and Wham! in 1984, and Ed Sheeran did so in 2017 with duets with Beyoncé and Eminem, and again in 2021 with duets with LadBaby and Elton John. Paul McCartney has been top eight times with various acts (four as The Beatles, and one each as Wings, Band Aid, Band Aid 20, and The Justice Collective). Cliff Richard has spent four Christmases at number one; two as a solo act, one with The Shadows and one as part of Band Aid II. The Spice Girls later equalled the then-record of three consecutive Christmas number ones, from 1996 to 1998; Spice Girl Melanie C achieved a fourth Christmas number one as a member of the Justice Collective in 2012, which also gave Robbie Williams his third. In 2022, LadBaby became the first act to achieve five consecutive number ones.

"Bohemian Rhapsody" by Queen, which reached the number-one spot at Christmas 1975 and 1991, was the only record to have reached the top twice, until "Last Christmas" by Wham!, which topped the charts in both 2023 and 2024, making it the first consecutive Christmas number one. "Mary's Boy Child" is the only song to be Christmas number one for two artists – Harry Belafonte in 1957 and Boney M. in 1978 – although "Do They Know It's Christmas?" has been Christmas number one four times, for three generations of Band Aid, and for the LadBaby parody in 2022. The original version of "Do They Know It's Christmas?" is the second-bestselling single in UK history (behind "Candle in the Wind 1997" by Elton John), while "Bohemian Rhapsody" is third.

== List ==
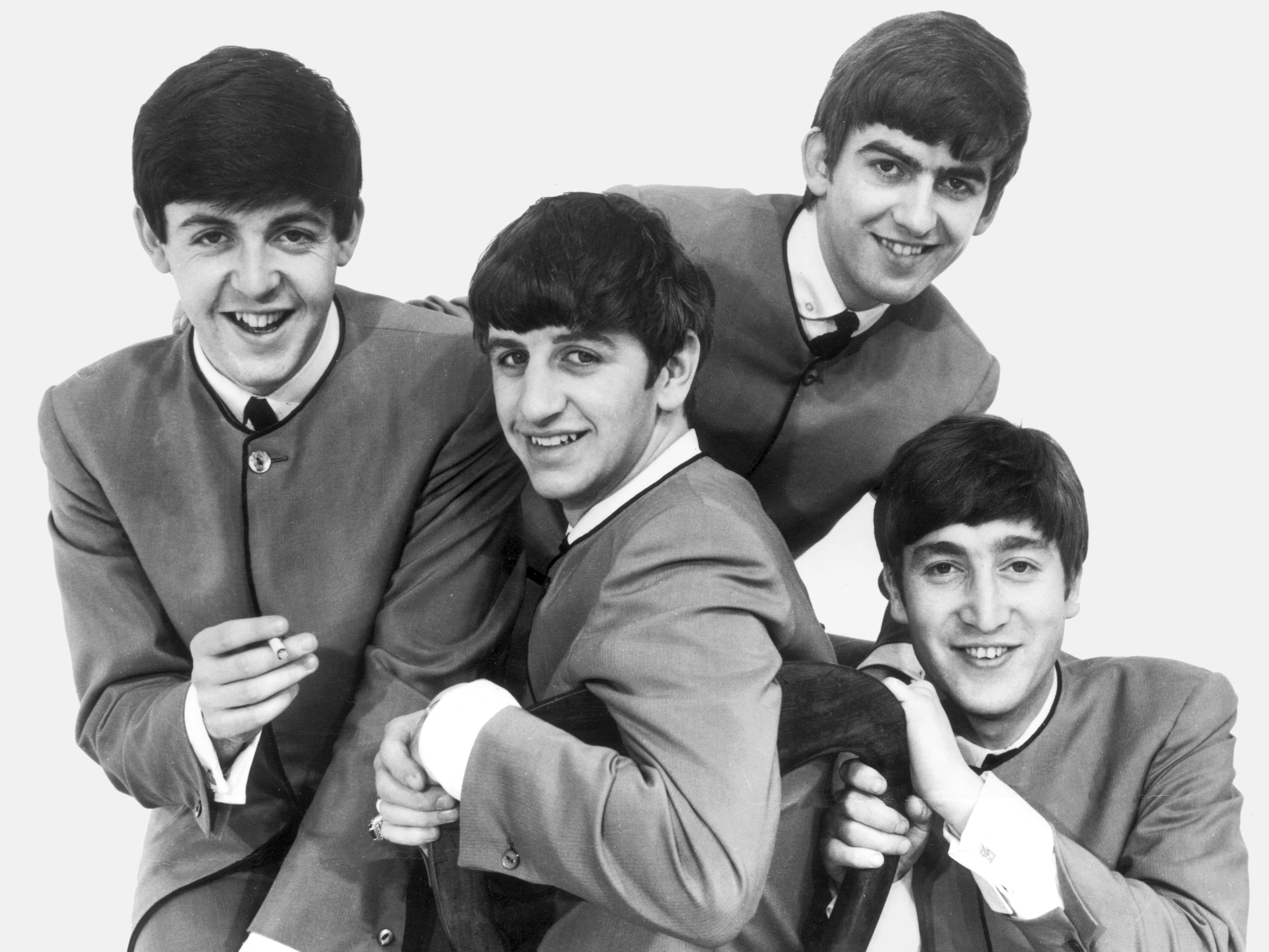
The Beatles had four Christmas number ones during the 1960s, three of which were consecutive.

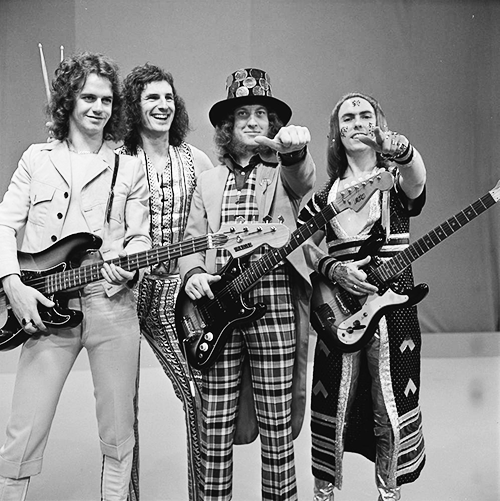
Slade reached number one with a Christmas-themed song in 1973.

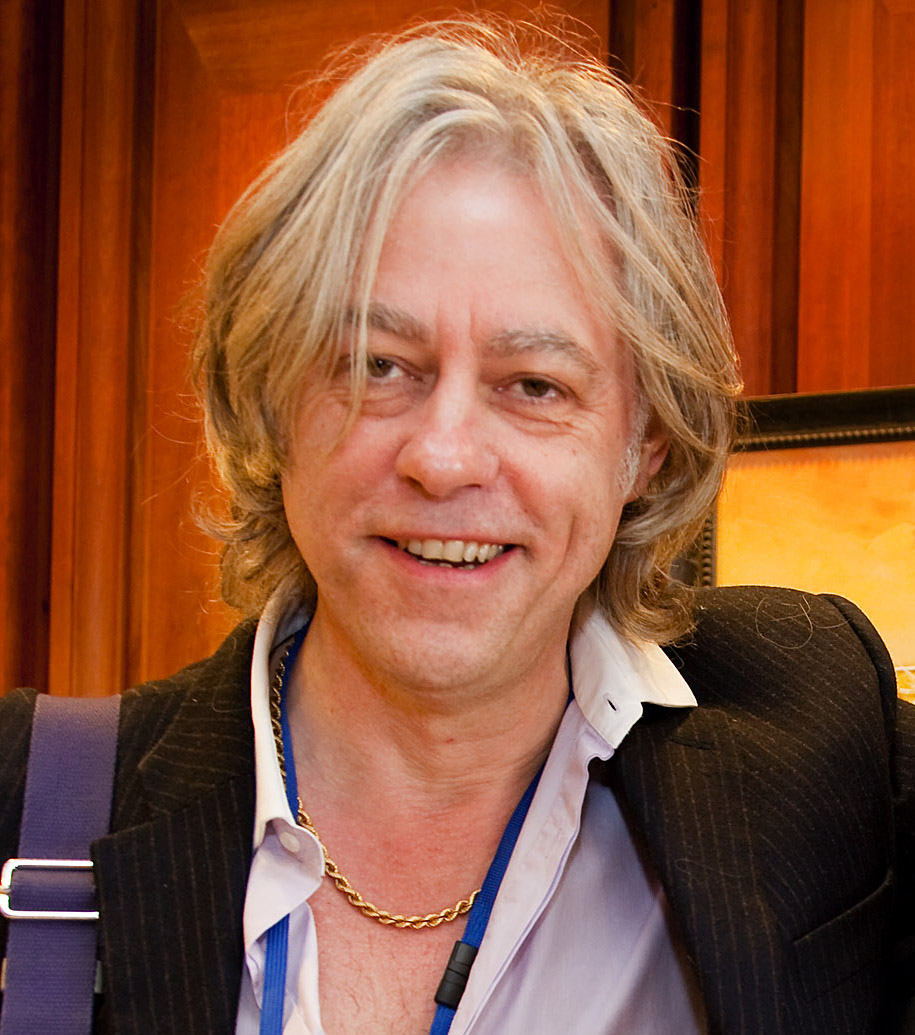
Bob Geldof, creator of charity supergroup Band Aid, who were Christmas number one in three incarnations with "Do They Know It's Christmas?"

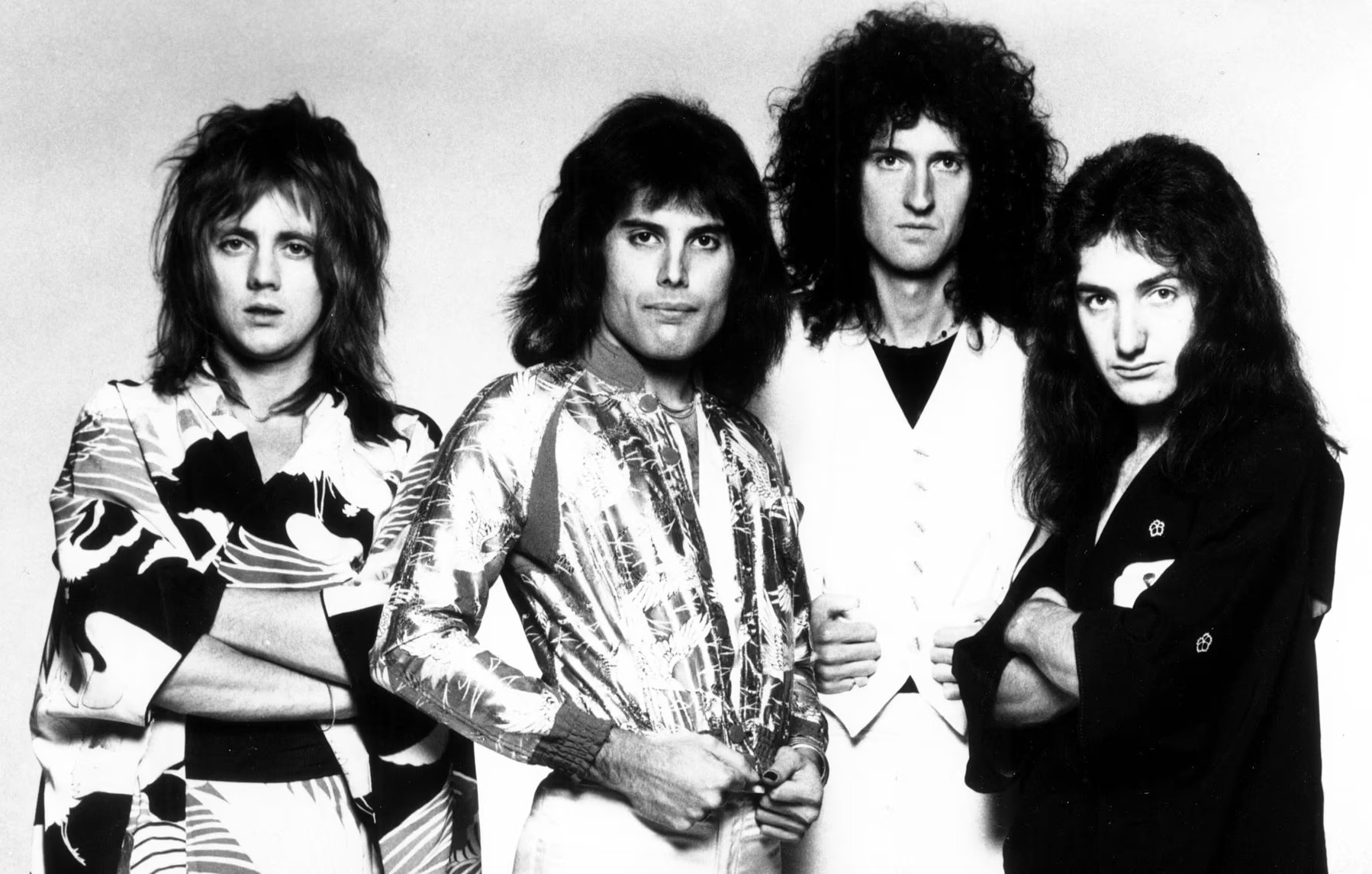
Queen's "Bohemian Rhapsody" reached number one twice (1975 and 1991).

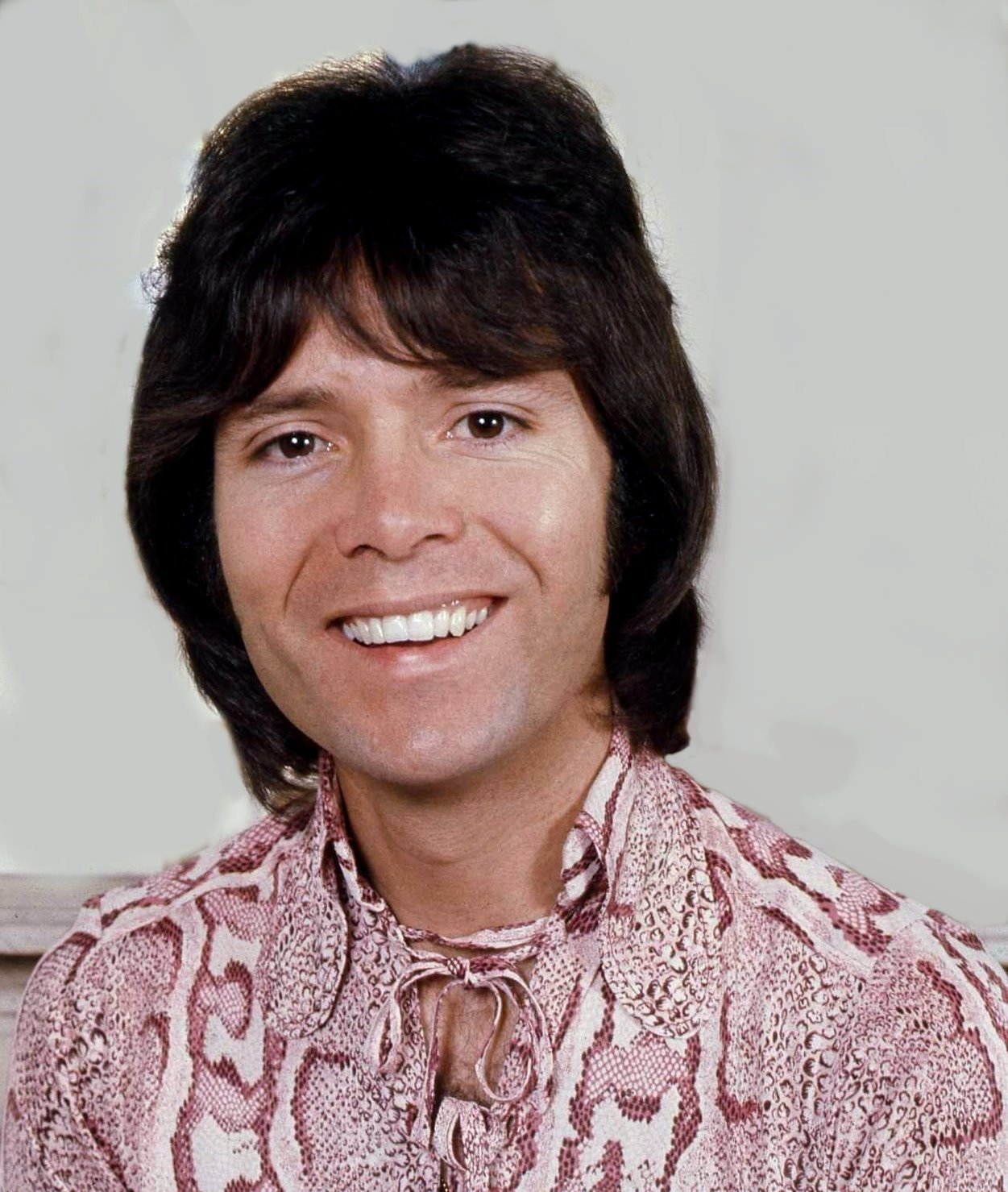
Cliff Richard reached the Christmas number one three times (and once with Band Aid II).

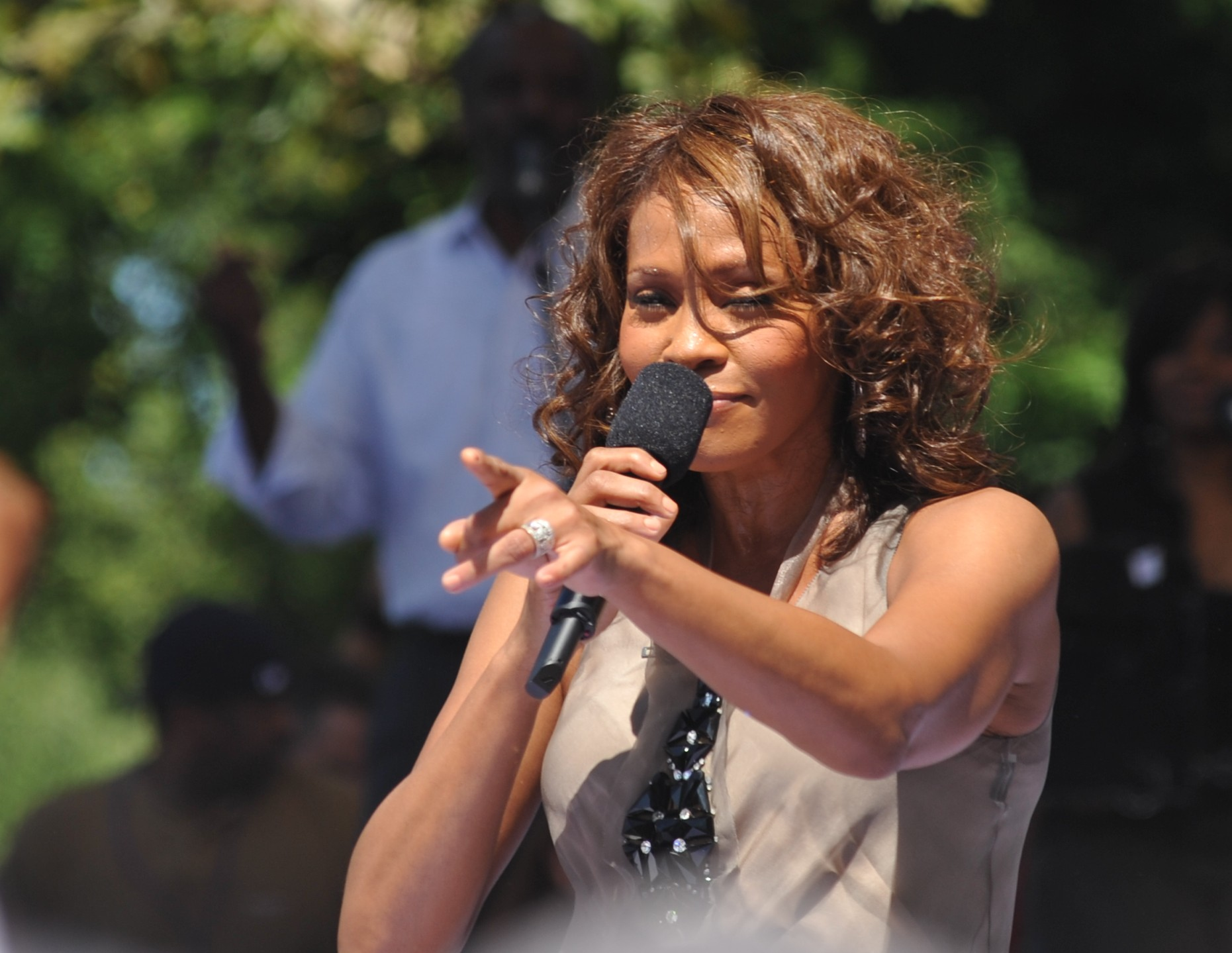
Whitney Houston was the first solo female vocalist with a Christmas number one with "I Will Always Love You".

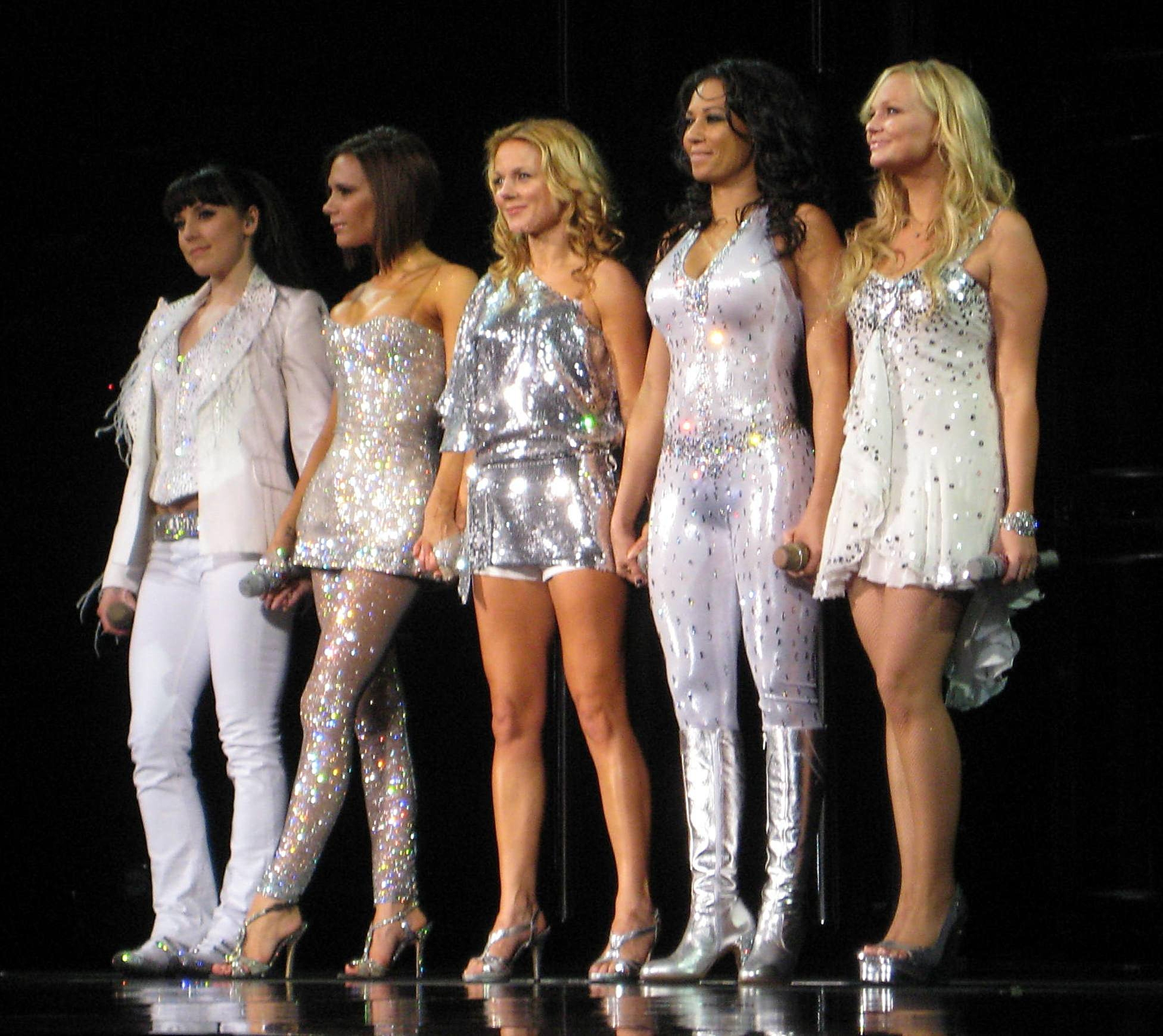
The Spice Girls had three consecutive Christmas number ones in the 1990s.

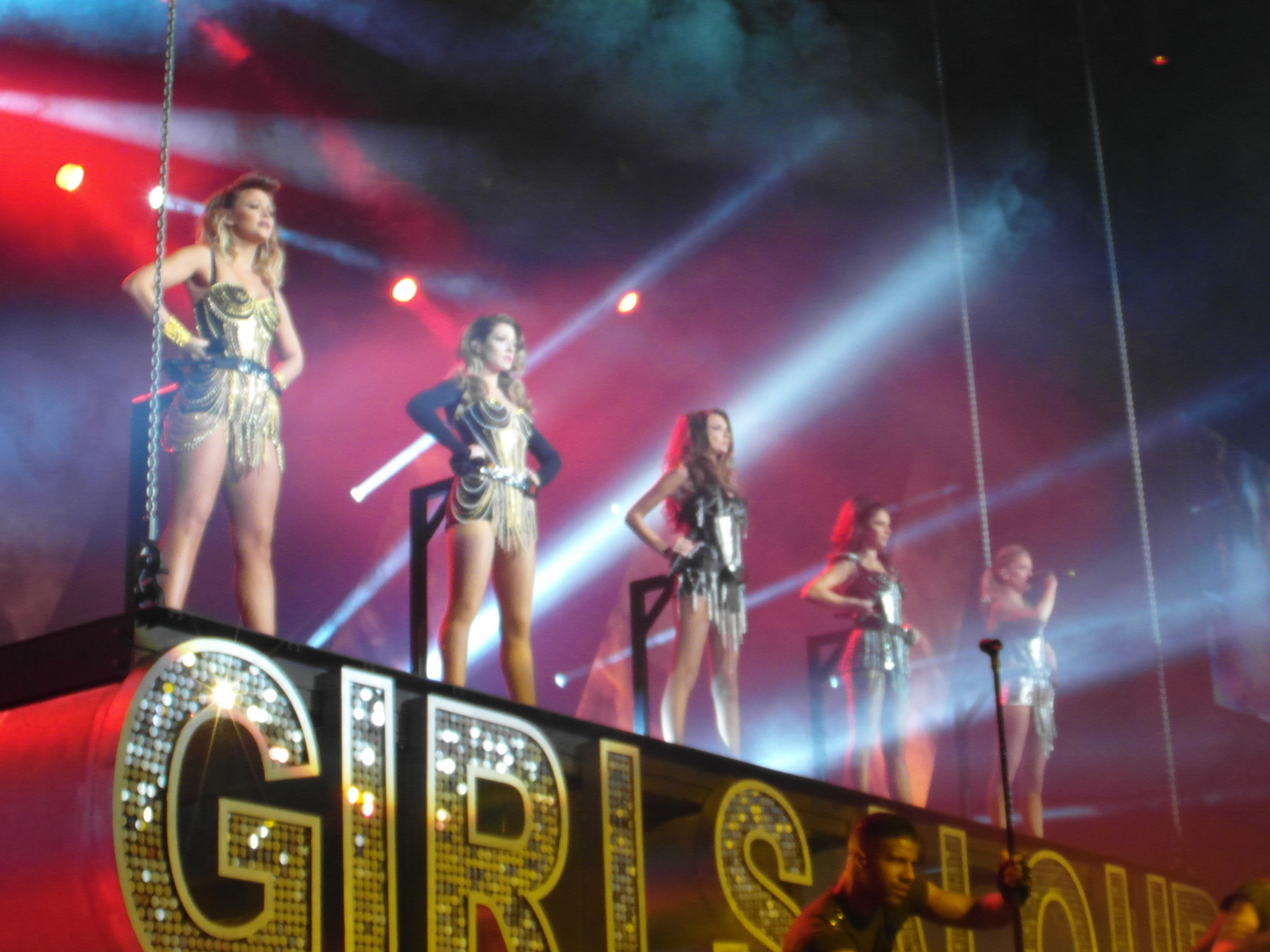
Girls Aloud's "Sound of the Underground" reached number one in 2002, edging out their fellow Popstars: The Rivals contestants One True Voice.

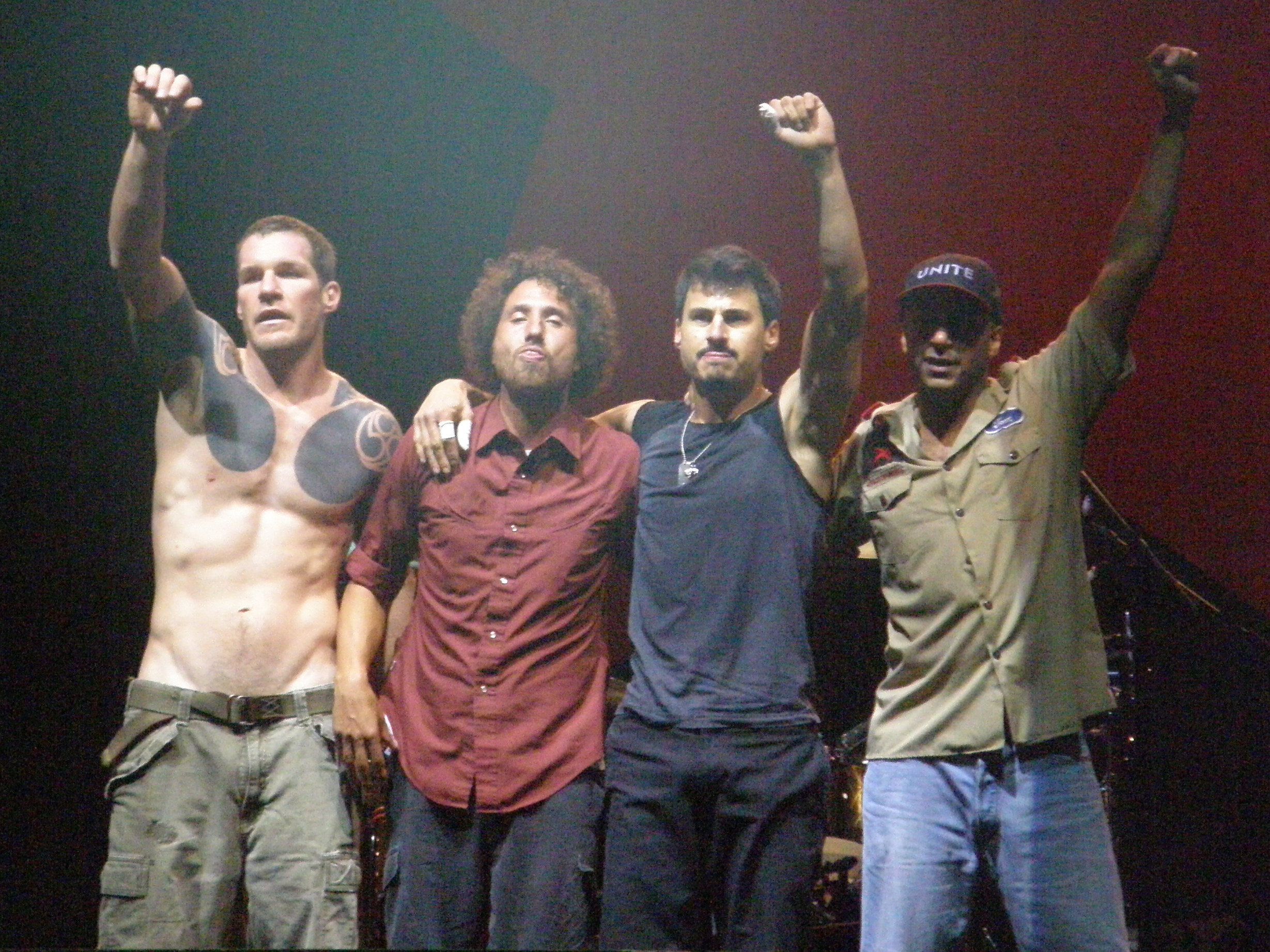
Rage Against the Machine's "Killing in the Name" achieved the Christmas number one in 2009, 17 years after its release.

Year	Artist	Song	Weeks
1952	Al Martino	"Here in My Heart"	9
1953	Frankie Laine	"Answer Me"	8
1954	Winifred Atwell	"Let's Have Another Party"	5
1955	Dickie Valentine	"Christmas Alphabet"	3
1956	Johnnie Ray	"Just Walkin' in the Rain"	7
1957	Harry Belafonte	"Mary's Boy Child"	7
1958	Conway Twitty	"It's Only Make Believe"	5
1959	Emile Ford and the Checkmates	"What Do You Want to Make Those Eyes at Me For?"	6
1960	Cliff Richard and the Shadows	"I Love You"	2
1961	Danny Williams	"Moon River"	2
1962	Elvis Presley	"Return to Sender"	3
1963	The Beatles	"I Want to Hold Your Hand"	5
1964	The Beatles	"I Feel Fine"	5
1965	The Beatles	"Day Tripper" / "We Can Work It Out" (Note: Released as a double A-side)	5
1966	Tom Jones	"Green, Green Grass of Home"	7
1967	The Beatles	"Hello, Goodbye"	7
1968	The Scaffold	"Lily the Pink"	4
1969	Rolf Harris	"Two Little Boys"	6
1970	Dave Edmunds	"I Hear You Knocking"	6
1971	Benny Hill	"Ernie (The Fastest Milkman in the West)"	4
1972	Jimmy Osmond	"Long Haired Lover from Liverpool"	5
1973	Slade	"Merry Xmas Everybody"	5
1974	Mud	"Lonely This Christmas"	4
1975	Queen	"Bohemian Rhapsody"	14
1976	Johnny Mathis	"When a Child Is Born (Soleado)"	3
1977	Wings	"Mull of Kintyre" / "Girls' School"	9
1978	Boney M.	"Mary's Boy Child – Oh My Lord"	4
1979	Pink Floyd	"Another Brick in the Wall (Part 2)"	5
1980	St Winifred's School Choir	"There's No One Quite Like Grandma"	2
1981	The Human League	"Don't You Want Me"	5
1982	Renée and Renato	"Save Your Love"	4
1983	The Flying Pickets	"Only You"	5
1984	Band Aid	"Do They Know It's Christmas?"	5
1985	Shakin' Stevens	"Merry Christmas Everyone"	2
1986	Jackie Wilson	"Reet Petite"	4
1987	Pet Shop Boys	"Always on My Mind"	4
1988	Cliff Richard	"Mistletoe and Wine" (Note: "Mistletoe and Wine" by Cliff Richard was announced as the 1988 Christmas number one a day later than usual, on Monday 26 December.)	4
1989	Band Aid II	"Do They Know It's Christmas?"	3
1990	Cliff Richard	"Saviour's Day"	1
1991	Queen	"Bohemian Rhapsody" / "These Are the Days of Our Lives"	14 / 5
1992	Whitney Houston	"I Will Always Love You"	10
1993	Mr Blobby	"Mr Blobby"	3
1994	East 17	"Stay Another Day"	5
1995	Michael Jackson	"Earth Song"	6
1996	Spice Girls	"2 Become 1"	3
1997	Spice Girls	"Too Much"	2
1998	Spice Girls	"Goodbye"	1
1999	Westlife	"I Have a Dream" / "Seasons in the Sun"	4
2000	Bob the Builder	"Can We Fix It?"	3
2001	Robbie Williams and Nicole Kidman	"Somethin' Stupid"	3
2002	Girls Aloud	"Sound of the Underground"	4
2003	Michael Andrews and Gary Jules	"Mad World"	3
2004	Band Aid 20	"Do They Know It's Christmas?"	4
2005	Shayne Ward (Note: That year's X Factor winner)	"That's My Goal"	4
2006	Leona Lewis	"A Moment Like This"	4
2007	Leon Jackson	"When You Believe"	3
2008	Alexandra Burke	"Hallelujah"	3
2009	Rage Against the Machine	"Killing in the Name" (Note: This song originally peaked at No. 25 on the chart in 1993; first download-only single to be a Christmas number one, which it achieved as a result of a successful Internet campaign to displace the X Factor winner's single.)	1
2010	Matt Cardle	"When We Collide" (Note: A cover of a Biffy Clyro song, originally titled "Many of Horror")	3
2011	Military Wives ft. Gareth Malone	"Wherever You Are"	1
2012	The Justice Collective (Note: The Justice Collective was the name taken by a group of British musicians and football personalities who released the song in aid of various charities associated with the Hillsborough disaster.)	"He Ain't Heavy, He's My Brother"	1
2013	Sam Bailey	"Skyscraper"	1
2014	Ben Haenow	"Something I Need"	1
2015	Lewisham and Greenwich NHS Choir	"A Bridge over You" (Note: A mashup cover of the Simon & Garfunkel song "Bridge over Troubled Water" and Coldplay's "Fix You")	1
2016	Clean Bandit ft. Sean Paul and Anne-Marie	"Rockabye"	9
2017	Ed Sheeran (Note: Versions of "Perfect" featuring Beyoncé ("Perfect Duet") and Andrea Bocelli ("Perfect Symphony") counted towards the placement; however, due to chart rules, only Sheeran was officially credited.)	"Perfect"	6
2018	LadBaby	"We Built This City"	1
2019	LadBaby	"I Love Sausage Rolls"	1
2020	LadBaby	"Don't Stop Me Eatin'"	1
2021	LadBaby ft. Ed Sheeran and Elton John	"Sausage Rolls for Everyone" (Note: A novelty version of the Ed Sheeran and Elton John song, "Merry Christmas")	1
2022	LadBaby	"Food Aid"	1
2023	Wham!	"Last Christmas"	11 (Note: 4 weeks at Christmas 2023; 3 weeks at Christmas 2024; 4 weeks not part of a Christmas number one run)
2024	Wham!	"Last Christmas"	11
2025	Kylie Minogue	"XMAS"	1

== See also ==
- List of UK singles chart Christmas number twos
- List of UK Albums Chart Christmas number ones
