= Mass (surname) =

Mass is a surname with either following meaning and origin:

- North German and Dutch: from a short form of the personal name Thomas. Compare Maas, Mas.
- Jewish (Ashkenazic): metonymic occupational name from German Mass 'measure', 'measurement'.

People surnamed Mass include:

- Jochen Mass (1946–2025), German racing driver and broadcaster
- Lawrence D. Mass (born 1946), American physician and writer who wrote the first press reports on the disease AIDS
- Wayne Mass (1946–2019), American football player
- Wendy Mass (born 1967), American author of young adult and children's books

Fictional characters include:

- Miss Mass, in the Marvel Comics universe
- Sayla Mass, in the Universal Century Gundam universe
