= Massive =

Massive is an adjective related to mass.

Massive may refer to:

== Arts, entertainment, and media ==
=== Music ===
- Massive (band), an Australian hard rock band
- "Massive" (song), a song by Drake from the 2022 album Honestly, Nevermind
- Massive Attack, a British musical group, who were temporarily known as Massive in 1991
- Massive, an album by The Supervillains released in 2008

=== Film and television ===
- Massive (TV series), a situation comedy first aired on BBC3 in September 2008
- Massive! (TV programme), a short-lived Saturday morning British television programme (1995–1996)
- The Massive, a starship in the U.S. animated television series Invader Zim
- Massive, the villain in Loonatics Unleashed, a U.S. animated television series

=== Other uses ===
- Massive Theatre Company, professional theatre company in Auckland, New Zealand
- Massive: Gay Erotic Manga and the Men Who Make It, a 2014 manga anthology
- The Massive (comics), an ongoing comic series
- MMO Games Magazine, formerly MASSIVE Magazine, a short-lived computer magazine

== Businesses ==
- Massive Development, a German computer game developer, acquired by JoWooD Productions in December 2000
- Massive Entertainment, a Swedish computer game developer
- Massive Goods, an American gay manga publisher
- Massive Incorporated, a subsidiary of Microsoft that implements dynamic advertising in video games

== Computing and technology ==
- MASSIVE (software), a software package for generating crowd-related visual effects for film and television
- NI Massive, a software synthesizer VST plugin from Native Instruments

== Mountains ==
- Mount Massive, Colorado, United States
- Massive Range, a part of the Canadian Rockies in Alberta, Canada
  - Massive Mountain

== See also ==
- Mass (disambiguation)
- Massif (disambiguation)
