= Maas (surname) =

Maas is a Dutch and North German patronymic surname, from an archaic short form of Thomas. It could also be a toponymic surname derived from the river Maas (French: Meuse). The surname is quite common in the Netherlands, ranking 43rd in 2007 (16,070 people).

People with the surname Maas include:

- Abe Maas (1855–1941), German-born American founder of the Maas Brothers stores
- Adriana Maas (1702–1746), Dutch stage actress
- Allan Maas (1922–2014), Australian rules footballer
- Annelies Maas (born 1960), Dutch swimmer
- Anthony Maas (1859–1927), German-born American exegete
- Benjamin Maas (born 1989), German footballer
- Bill Maas (born 1962), American football player
- Bob Maas (1907–1996), Dutch Olympic sailor
- Cees Maas (born 1947), Dutch businessman, CFO of the ING Group
- Cheryl Maas (born 1984), Dutch snowboarder
- Chris Maas (born 1957), American canoe sailor and builder
- Cornald Maas (born 1962), Dutch television presenter
- David E. Maas (born 1940), American historian
- Dick Maas (born 1951), Dutch film maker
- Dirk Maas (1659–1717), Dutch landscape painter
- Duke Maas (1929–1976), American baseball player
- Erich Maas (born 1940), German footballer
- Ernest Maas (1892–1986), American screenwriter
- Frans Maas (born 1964), Dutch long jumper
- Fred Maas (born 1957), American businessman
- Frederica Sagor Maas (1900–2012), American playwright, author and supercentenarian
- Georg Maas (born 1960), German screenwriter and movie director
- Greg Maas (born 1966), American soccer goalkeeper
- Günther Maas (born 1941), German wrestler
- Heiko Maas (born 1966), German politician
- Henry Maas (born 1949?), Australian artist, Melbourne café and club impresario, cabaret performer (The Busby Berkleys, Buddy Lovestein) & lead singer of Bachelors from Prague
- Hermann Maas (1877–1970), German pastor and opponent of Nazism
- Hiltje Maas-van de Kamer (born 1941), Dutch botanist
- Isabella Offenbach Maas (1817–1891), German-American opera singer
- James Maas (1938–2025), American social psychologist known for his sleep research
- Jan Maas (cyclist, born 1900) (1900–1977), Dutch racing cyclist
- Jan Maas (1911–1962), Dutch Olympic sailor
- Jane Maas (1932–2018), American advertising executive and author
- Jason Maas (born 1975), Canadian football quarterback
- Jelle Maas (born 1991), Dutch badminton player
- Jeremy Maas (1928–1997), British art dealer and art historian
- Jo Maas (born 1954), Dutch road cyclist
- Johannes Petrus Maas (1861–1941), Dutch sculptor
- Joseph Maas (1847–1886), English tenor
- Kevin Maas (born 1965), American baseball player
- Melvin Maas (1898–1964), American Marine aviator and politician from Minnesota
- Mike Maas (1979-) Professional Walleye Angler from Wisconsin, USA
- Mirte Maas (born 1991), Dutch fashion model
- Nell Ginjaar-Maas (1931–2012), Dutch politician
- Nellie Maas (born 1935), Dutch figure skater
- Nicolaes Maes (1634–1693), Dutch genre and portrait painter
- Paul Maas (1880–1964), German philologist known for Maas's law
- Paul Maas (born 1939), Dutch botanist and a specialist in the flora of the neotropics
- Peter Maas (1929–2001), American journalist and author
- Rob Maas (born 1969), Dutch footballer
- Rudolph Arnold Maas Geesteranus (1911–2003), Dutch mycologist
- Rupert Maas (born 1960), English painting specialist and gallery owner
- Sarah J. Maas (born 1986), American fantasy author
- Sharon Maas (born 1951), Guyanese novelist
- Sivan Malkin Maas (born 1970s), Israeli humanistic rabbi
- Timo Maas (born 1969), German DJ
- Tjaarke Maas (1974–2004), Dutch painter
- Willard Maas (1906–1971), American experimental filmmaker and poet
- Winy Maas (born 1958), Dutch architect
- Wolfram Maas (born 1950), German diplomat

== See also ==
- Maas (disambiguation)
- Maes (surname), variant spelling of the surname
- Maass, a German surname
- Mace (surname)
