= XMA =

XMA may refer to:

- Extreme martial arts, a sport that combines elements from martial arts, acrobatics, and gymnastics, with an emphasis on showmanship
- XMA (audio format), Extensible Management Agent, the native Xbox 360 compressed audio format
- extended memory area; an addressable region of memory under a DOS Extender
- Expanded Memory Adapter, an IBM standard for XT-era expanded memory
- XMA, part of the Westcoast Group that distributes IT equipment

== See also ==
- Xmas (disambiguation)
- XM4 (disambiguation)
