= Chris Maas =

American canoe sailor

- Occupation: canoe sailor

Chris Maas is an American canoe sailor.

Maas became the 2008 World Champion in the development canoes event by finishing in front of fellow Americans Steve Clark and Oliver Moore.

== Career highlights ==
2008
Port Phillip Bay, (gold) 1st, World Championships Canoe Sailing, Development Canoe
