= Álvaro Mas =

Spanish footballer

Personal information
- Full name: Álvaro Mas Huertas
- Date of birth: 22 May 1992 (age 34)
- Place of birth: Elche, Spain
- Height: 1.81 m (5 ft 11 1/2 in)
- Position: Midfielder

Team information
- Current team: Ilicitana

Youth career
- 2008–2009: SCD Intangco
- 2009–2010: CD Pablo Iglesias
- 2010–2011: Elche
- 2010–2011: → Dama de Elche (loan)

Senior career*
Years	Team	Apps	(Gls)
2011–2013	Jove Español B		
2012–2013	Jove Español	1	(0)
2013–2014	Hércules B	12	(0)
2013–2015	Hércules	1	(0)
2014–2015	→ Orihuela (loan)	26	(0)
2015–2016	Quintanar Rey	8	(0)
2016–	Ilicitana	36	(2)
- * Club domestic league appearances and goals as of 20 January 2018

Álvaro Mas Huertas (born 22 May 1992) is a Spanish footballer who plays for CFUD Ilicitana as a midfielder.

== Club career ==
Born in Elche, Valencian Community, Mas made his senior debuts with lowly FC Jove Español San Vicente. In the summer of 2013 he moved straight into Segunda División with neighbouring Hércules CF, immediately earning the trust of manager Quique Hernández and appearing during the preseason.

Mas made his debut in the competition on 17 August 2013, coming on as a late substitute for Javier Portillo in a 1–1 home draw against Real Zaragoza. On 22 August of the following year he was loaned to Tercera División's Orihuela CF.
