= Maes (surname) =

Maes or Maës is a Dutch and Spanish (Maes/e) patronymic surname. It is the third most common surname in Belgium (25,683 people). Notable people with the surname include:

== Maes ==
- Andreas Maes (1514–1573), Flemish priest, humanist and student of Syriac
- Brian Maes (born 1956), American musician
- Camillus Paul Maes (1846–1915), Belgian-born bishop in the United States
- Caroline Maes (born 1982), Belgian tennis player
- Femke Maes (born 1982), Belgian footballer
- Friedrich-Wilhelm Maes (1913–1945), German military commander
- Gino Maes (born 1957), Belgian footballer
- Godfried Maes (1649 – 1700), Flemish painter
- Hermine Maes, Belgian behavior geneticist
- Isaak Maes (born 2001), American musician
- Jef Maes (1905–1996), Belgian composer and violinist
- Jules Maes (1882-?), Belgian fencer
- Kevin Maes, American politician
- Kristof Maes (born 1988), Belgian football goalkeeper
- Lieve Maes (born 1960), Belgian politician
- Louis Maes (born 1913, date of death unknown), Belgian canoer
- Merel Maes (born 2005), Belgian high jumper
- Natacha Maes (born 1964), Belgian racing cyclist
- Nelly Maes (born 1941), Belgian politician
- Nicolaes Maes (1634–1693), Dutch Baroque painter
- Nicole Maes (born 1974), Dutch politician
- Nikolas Maes (born 1986), Belgian racing cyclist
- Pattie Maes (born 1961), Media Arts professor at MIT
- Peter Maes (born 1964), Belgian footballer
- Romain Maes (1913–1983), Belgian cyclist, winner of Tour de France 1935
- Sven Maes (born 1973), Belgian DJ and trance music producer
- Sylvère Maes (1909–1966), Belgian cyclist, winner of Tour de France 1936 and 1939
- Virginia Orr Maes (1920–1986), American malacologist

== Maës ==
- Eugène Maës (1890–1945), French footballer
- Tove Maës (1921–2010), Danish actress of stage, television and film

== Others ==
Maes is also a Welsh or Brythonic word for "field". It is pronounced "Mize", and is a possible etymological source of that name as well.

== See also ==
- Maas (surname)
- Maëlys, French feminine name of Breton origin
