= Joan Mas =

Spanish painter

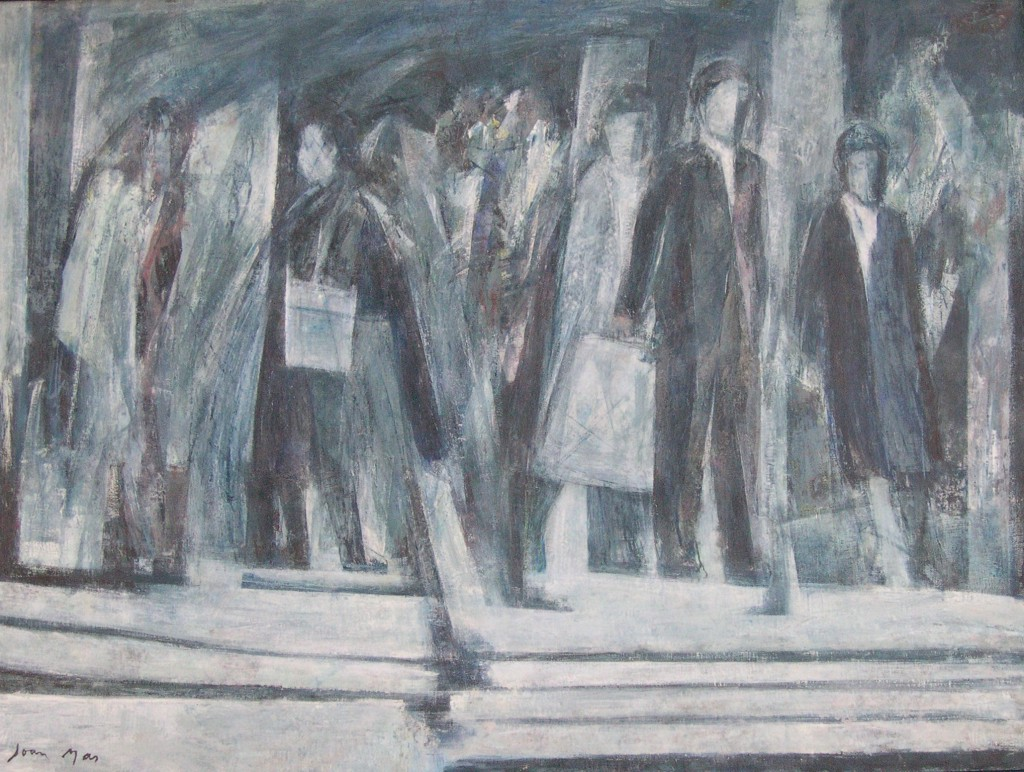
Gent (1980), oil on canvas.

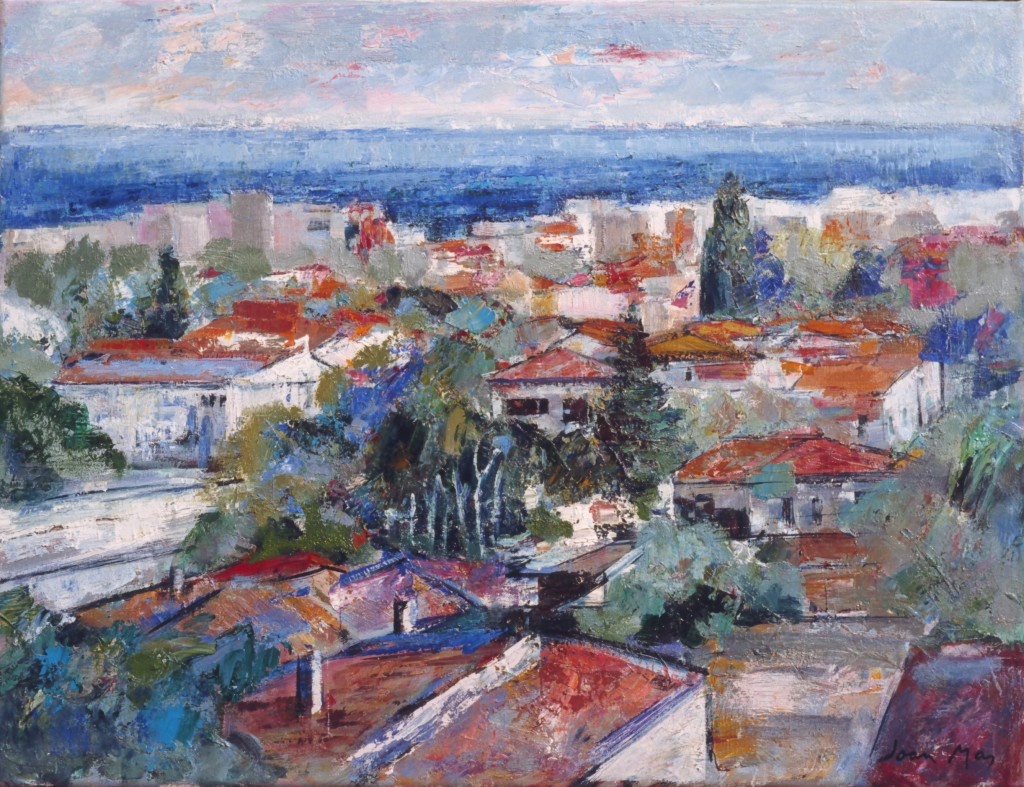
Mediterrania (2002), oil on canvas.

Joan Mas i Ramon (Barcelona, 1934) is a Post-Impressionist style fine artist based at Barcelona and Paris.

== Biography ==
Joan Mas was born in Barcelona in 1934. He went to Paris in the late 1950s, when he studied painting under the guidance of Roger Chastel at the ENSBA (École Nationale Supérieure des Beaux-Arts) in Paris, from 1961 to 1968. Since then, his work has been exhibited mainly in Europe, specially at Barcelona and Paris. .

== Work ==
His painting was created in the Post-Impressionism with influences of cubism, abstract art and the new figurative. It departs from the conventional dogmas of landscape painting, to give life to a remarkably personal language.
