= Hermine Maes =

Belgian behavioral geneticist

Hermine H. M. Maes is a Belgian behavioral geneticist and Associate Professor in both the Department of Human and Molecular Genetics at the Virginia Commonwealth University School of Medicine and the Virginia Institute for Psychiatric and Behavioral Genetics. She received her Ph.D. from the Katholieke Universiteit Leuven in 1992. Maes' research focuses on the methodology of genetic epidemiology and the relationships between physical and mental health. Her husband and sometime research partner is Michael Neale.
