= Mass (disambiguation) =

Mass is the quantity of matter in a physical body and a measure of the body's inertia.

Mass or MASS may also refer to:

== Arts, entertainment, and media ==
=== Music ===
- Mass (band), an English post-punk band
- Mass (music), a choral composition that sets liturgical text to music
- Mass (Stravinsky), a composition by Igor Stravinsky
- Mass (Bernstein), a musical theater work by Leonard Bernstein
- Mass (Grotus album), 1996
- Mass (The Gazette album), 2021
- The Mass (album), by musical project Era
- Mass, a 2011 album by New Zealand musician Alastair Galbraith

=== Other uses in arts, entertainment, and media ===
- Mass (2004 film), Indian Telugu-language film
- Mass (2021 film), American drama film
- Mass (novel), a 1973 novel by Filipino author F. Sionil José
- The Masses, a socialist magazine published in the US from 1911 to 1917

== Military ==
- MASS (decoy system), a naval defence system
- M26 Modular Accessory Shotgun System (or MASS), a developmental shotgun for the M16 rifle/M4 carbine family of guns
- MASS, Marine Air Support Squadrons within the United States Marine Corps

== People with the name ==
- Mass (surname)
- Peter Harris (producer), an electronic musician who uses the alias Mass
- Mass Sarr, Jr. (born 1973), a Liberian former footballer

== Places ==
- Mass City, Michigan, also known as Mass, an unincorporated community in the United States
- Maß (Lauer) (pronounced "mass"), a river of Bavaria, Germany, left tributary of the Lauer
- Massachusetts (abbreviated Mass or MA), a U.S. state in New England
- Massachusetts Bay (abbreviated Mass Bay), a bay off the U.S. state of the same name

== Religion ==
- Mass (liturgy), an act of worship in some Christian churches
- Mass in the Catholic Church, the main act of worship of the Catholic Church

== Society ==
- Mass Party, a political party in Thailand (2006–2009?)
- Mass society, a society based on relations between huge numbers of people, whose prototypical denizen is the "mass man"
- Mass politics, politics in the mass society, featuring especially the modern political party

== Other uses ==
- BrightBus, a former British vehicle body manufacturer and school bus operator that previously traded as MASS Engineering
- Manab Adhikar Sangram Samiti, a human rights NGO in Assam (India)
- Marc and Eva Stern Math and Science School (Stern MASS)
- Maritime Autonomous Surface Ship, An autonomous cargo ship
- Maß (pronounced "mass"), a German word describing the amount of beer in a regulation mug, also used for the mug itself
- Mass (mass spectrometry), a chemical analysis technique
- Mass (object), a high-density object
- Mawson Analytical Spectrometry Services, services offered at the University of Adelaide, Australia
- Tumor, or mass, a neoplasm that is enlarged

== See also ==
- Landmass or land mass, a continuous area of land
- Massive (disambiguation)
- Weight (disambiguation)
