= XMAS (song) =

2025 single by Kylie Minogue

Single by Kylie Minogue

from the album Kylie Christmas (Fully Wrapped)
- B-side: "Office Party"
- Released: 5 November 2025
- Length: 3:16
- Label: Darenote; Parlophone
- Songwriters: Duck Blackwell; Luke Fitton; Kylie Minogue; Richard Stannard
- Producers: Duck Blackwell; Richard Stannard

Kylie Minogue singles chronology
"Last Night I Dreamt I Fell in Love" (2025)	"XMAS" (2025)	"These Alarms" (2026)

Music video
- "XMAS" on YouTube

"XMAS" is a song by Australian singer Kylie Minogue. It was written by Duck Blackwell, Luke Fitton, Richard Stannard and Minogue for the 2025 Fully Wrapped reissue of her first holiday album, Kylie Christmas (2015), with production by Blackwell and Stannard. An Amazon Music Original, it was released as a digital single through Amazon Music on 5 November 2025, with a physical release following on 12 December 2025. It was the UK singles chart Christmas number-one for 2025.

== Development and writing ==
"XMAS" was written by Minogue along with Duck Blackwell, Luke Fitton, and Richard Stannard, with production by Blackwell and Stannard. In an interview, Minogue stated that the song originated in 2015 during a summer visit to Soho House in Berlin, shortly after completing work on Kylie Christmas. Ideas for "XMAS" emerged on the club's terrace after "a couple of glasses of wine". The concept developed as a playful twist on American disco group Village People's 1978 hit single "YMCA", reimagined as "XMAS", and the chorus remained unused for a decade before being revisited.

Ultimately, it was not released at the time, as it did not feel like the right fit for that project. The song remained unreleased while it underwent further development, with the creative team later revisiting it to ensure it aligned with Minogue's vision and felt contemporary for a 2025 release. Minogue later described it as a "song I needed to exorcise. I needed to get it out. It's been 10 years in the making."

The song was recorded between dates on Minogue's 2025 Tension Tour. Once completed and mastered, the track stood out internally for its immediate memorability, with its chorus described as "an instant earworm after only a single listen." Planning for the release of "XMAS" began approximately a year in advance, with the campaign developing steadily throughout 2025. From as early as January, the team set a clear objective of achieving both a Christmas number-one album and single, shaping the rollout strategy accordingly. Confidence in the song's prospects grew as preparations progressed, particularly after securing Amazon Music as a promotional partner.

== Critical reception ==
Classic Pop editor Annie Zaelski called "XMAS" a "peppy synth pop" track and an "undeniable earworm", while noting that it "lean[t] on tricks like spelling out catchphrases rather than more clever gambits". Daniel Welsh of HuffPost rated it 2 out of 4 stars and considered it "a nice enough – though ... pretty naff – festive ditty that will no doubt particularly appeal to little ones". However, Welsh believed the song "sound[ed] like it was put together in a board meeting" and criticised it for the Amazon deal and "lean[ing] into trends laid out in recent hits" including "its own TikTok dance".

== Commercial performance ==
"XMAS" debuted at number 64 on the UK Singles Chart in the week ending 4 December 2025. On 14 December 2025, the UK's Official Charts Company announced their midweek chart list, showing that "XMAS" was at the number one position, 7,000 copies ahead of the number two competitor, Wham!'s "Last Christmas" (1984), in the race for the 2025 Christmas number-one single. The song became Minogue's eighth UK number-one single overall and her first chart-topping single in twenty-two years after "Slow" (2003). With this achievement, Minogue became the first woman to score UK number-one singles across four different decades (the 1980s, 1990s, 2000s, and 2020s) and the oldest female artist to have a number one with a new recording.

Selling 55,926 units during the week, "XMAS" ended Wham!'s two-year reign at the top of the Christmas chart and made Minogue the first solo female artist to claim the Christmas number-one song in 12 years, as well as only the third international female solo artist ever to do so. The track is Amazon Music's first Christmas number-one and was the best-selling physical and vinyl single of the week, marking Minogue's biggest UK week for single sales and streams in over two decades. As of 19 December 2025, "XMAS" has sold 110,685 copies in the United Kingdom.

In Australia, "XMAS" debuted at number 4 on the Australian Artist Singles chart.

== Music video ==
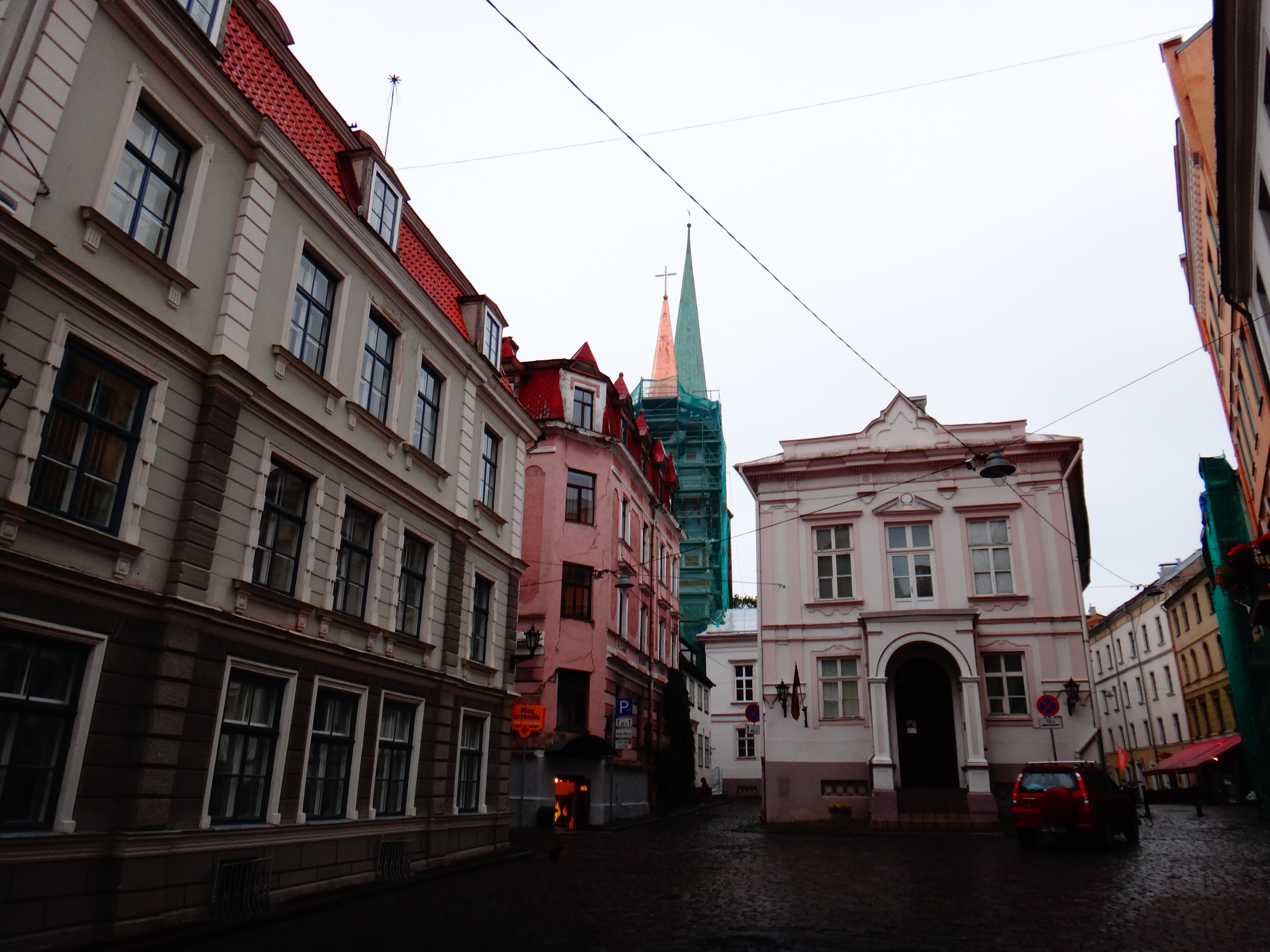
Exterior scenes for "XMAS" were filmed at various locations in Riga's Old Town, including Mazā Pils Street.

Minogue reteamed with director Sophie Muller to film a music video for "XMAS". Filming took place in late October 2025 in Riga, Latvia, where the visuals for "Office Party" and "Hot in December" were also shot. While the interior scenes were filmed at the Riga Film Studio, exterior scenes for "XMAS" were shot at various locations in Riga Old Town, including Mazā Pils Street. The video sees Minogue performing in a host of seasonal settings and features cameo appearances by Minogue's younger sister Dannii, actress Naomi Watts, and ABBA member Björn Ulvaeus. It premiered on 12 December 2025.

== Formats and track listings ==
- 7-inch vinyl, 12-inch zoetrope vinyl and 2-track CD single
1. "XMAS"
2. "Office Party"
- Digital download
1. "XMAS" – 3:15
2. "XMAS" (extended mix) – 5:05
3. "XMAS" (instrumental) – 3:15
4. "XMAS" (a cappella) – 3:15
5. "XMAS" (Gingey's Party Mix) – 4:53

== Charts ==
Weekly chart performance
Chart (2025–2026)	Peak position
Australian Artist Singles (ARIA)	4
Global 200 (Billboard)	155
UK Singles (Official Charts)	1
US Bubbling Under Hot 100 (Billboard)	13

== Certifications ==
Certifications for Xmas
Region	Certification	Certified units/sales
United Kingdom (BPI)	Silver	200,000^{‡}
^{‡} Sales+streaming figures based on certification alone.

== Release history ==
"XMAS" release history
Region	Date	Format	Label	Ref.
Various	5 November 2025	Digital download; streaming	Darenote/Parlophone	
Various	12 December 2025	CD single; 7" vinyl; 12" zoetrope vinyl	Darenote/Parlophone	

== See also ==
- List of UK singles chart Christmas number ones
- List of UK singles chart number one of 2025
