= Ezequiel González Mas =

Spanish literary historian

- Born: 20 July 1919
- Died: 15 October 2007 (aged 88)
- Occupation: Historian

Ezequiel González Mas (20 July 1919 – 15 October 2007) was a Spanish historian of Spanish literature, a cervantista, poet, art critic and writer.

== Biography ==
González Mas was born in Madrid on 20 July 1919. He finished high school in 1936 and was mobilized by the Republican army in Alicante. Due to his myopia, he was assigned to the music band of the VI Retaguardia Battalion; in a bombardment he was seriously injured. In 1939 he returned to Madrid and suffered the persecution and marginalization of the victorious faction. He started publishing poetry in the magazine of the Complutense University of Madrid, to which he had returned to study after an interruption due to another military service. He also wrote a paper on Chateaubriand which earned him a Parisian scholarship at the Sorbonne, where he completed a course of Contemporary French Literature, and there he made friends with many intellectuals: Jean-Paul Sartre, André Malraux, Albert Camus and the painter Henri Matisse, among others, with whom he expanded his vision of a cultural aesthetic.

Having studied philosophy and literature at the university in Madrid, he eventually graduated in Romance studies, and then devoted himself to private education. He gave lectures at the Ateneo de Madrid and befriended Antonio Buero Vallejo, José Corrales Egea, Vicente Soto, Miguel Labordeta and Francisco García Pavón, who, evoking those days, wrote:

It was Ezequiel who put us in touch with the old masters. He was the best guide to literary tourism. How many dozen literature students did he introduce and took home to Pío Baroja, Luis Ruiz Contreras, José Gutiérrez Solana, Azorín...!

Together with José María Jove and José Antonio Novais, he founded the La Botella en el Mar collection. After having been a student, and a favorite, of Dámaso Alonso and José Camón Aznar, with the latter of whom he used to visit the Museo del Prado, at the end of the 1940s he was the ad honorem secretary of Luis Ruiz Contreras. Between 1949 and 1950 he was a teacher at the Piedrahíta High School (Ávila), in the middle of the Sierra de Gredos; there he wrote Tres Elegías (Cementerio Civil; Aniversario siempre; A una niña difunta), only one hundred copies were printed (Valencia, 1951) to circumvent Franco's censorship, which could have been cruel to the first of those texts.

In 1952, fed up with the cultural and ideological asphyxia of his country, he obtained, through his friend Antonio Rodríguez Huéscar, who recommended him to José Ortega y Gasset, a contract as a professor of literature at the University of Guayaquil in Ecuador, where he met with professors such as the philosopher Antonio Salvador de la Cruz and the historian Juan Astorga and, at the University of Cuenca, with the philosopher Francisco Álvarez González and the Romanesque philologist Luis Fradejas Sánchez. Later, he also became dean of the Faculty of Letters at the University of Guayaquil.

He was part of juries for literary awards and between 1956 and 1957 wrote the column Los Libros in the Sunday supplement of the newspaper La Nación. In 1958 he received a doctorate in Philosophy and Letters from the University of Cuenca and compiled the poems published in his Sunday column Lienzo y Lira, also in La Nación. He edited the Museo Privado, poems about paintings by famous painters. In 1959 he published the essay Sartre and Camus, the New Spirit of French Literature. He continued with poetry: in 1960 he published Nivel del sueño.

Perhaps his best known work is El Quijote. Invitación a la locura, which sold out in just one month. González Mas was very active: he didn't only teach at the Faculties of Philosophy and Jurisprudence, but also at the School of Diplomacy. In 1961 he was elected a member of the House of Ecuadorian Culture; moreover, he directed the magazine of the University of Guayaquil, where he was teaching at the Faculty of Philosophy and Letters.

He later became Professor of Literature at the University of Puerto Rico in Río Piedras.

He returned to Guayaquil in 1964, and it was in this year that he began his greatest work, the monumental History of Spanish Literature (Historia de la Literatura Española), writing his first volume on the Middle Ages; the work reached five volumes and stands out for its exhaustive documentation and well-elaborated biobibliographies.

Returned to the University of Guayaquil by 1965, in August 1966 he was called again to Río Piedras and the following year to Mayagüez, where he directed the magazine Atenea of the Faculty of Arts and Letters of the University of Puerto Rico.

Spain appointed him Honorary Vice Consul and in 1968 the first volume of his History of Spanish Literature was printed, which accredited him as one of the best specialists in this field. In 1973 the second volume appeared, on the Renaissance, and the third on the Baroque and in that same year he published El retrato literario y otros motivos, a collection of critical essays. Later he published studies on Pío Baroja (1974) and Juan Ramón Jiménez (1981), participating in various international conferences.

He retired in 1984 in Puerto Rico and decided to return to Guayaquil. They made him a member of the Institute of Hispanic Culture and honorary member of the Spanish Charity Society and the Casal Cátala. In 1997 he was appointed member of the Hispano-American Academy of Cádiz, for which reason he returned to Spain after 45 years of absence, reading there a speech on José Enrique Rodó. He was in Seville, Madrid and Cádiz, meeting his many nephews, and in Genoa, visiting his sick brother.

Among his other works of poetry there are seven sonnets dedicated to El Greco.

== Major works ==
- Siete Sonetos al Greco, Madrid, 1944.
- Sonetos al Greco y a Van Gogh. Valencia: Tip. Moderna, 1947.
- Tres elegías Madrid, 1951.
- Oratorio marino, Guayaquil, 1955
- La generación del 98 y América [Guayaquil]: Departamento de Publicaciones, 1958.
- Museo privado, Guayaquil, 1958
- Sartre y Camus; el nuevo espíritu de la literatura francesa. [Guayaquil] Universidad de Guayaquil - Departamento de Publicaciones, 1959.
- Nivel del sueño, Guayaquil, 1960
- El "Quijote", invitación a la locura, Guayaquil: [Artes Gráficas Senefelder] 1960.
- Historia de la literatura española (1968–2005), 5 vols.
  - I. Época Medioeval, siglos X al XV (Río Piedras: Editorial de La Torre, 1968)
  - II. Renacimiento, siglo XVI (Río Piedras: Editorial de La Torre, 1973)
  - III. Barroco, siglo XVII. (Río Piedras: EDUPR, 1989)
  - IV. Edad Moderna, siglos XVIII y XIX. (Barcelona: Promociones y Publicaciones Universitarias PPU, 2005)
  - V. Los Contemporáneos, siglo XX. (Río Piedras: EDUPR, 2005)
- El retrato literario y otros motivos, Mayagüez: Universidad de Puerto Rico, 1973.
- "Pío Baroja y la novela de folletín", en VV. AA., Pío Baroja, coord. por Javier Martínez Palacio, Madrid: Taurus, 1974, págs. 165–175
- José Enrique Rodó y España Cádiz: Real Academia Hispano-Americana, 1997.
