= David E. Maas =

American historian

David Edward Maas (born February 10, 1940, in Los Angeles, California) is Emeritus Professor of History at Wheaton College (Illinois), United States. He was first appointed to Wheaton's faculty in 1970 and retired in 2010.

== Education ==
He gained a B.A. in History from Wheaton College in 1962, an M.A. in History from California State University at Los Angeles in 1964 and a Ph.D. in History from the University of Wisconsin–Madison in 1972.

== Professional and personal interests ==
Dr. Maas discovers history by studying the "average" person of the past. His emphasis has led him to primary documents from history such as letters, speeches, sermons, and newspapers. He focuses much of his attention on U.S. History with special emphasis on the Revolutionary War and the Civil War.

He is married to wife Bobbie and has four children (David, Pam, Beth, and Daniel) and 15 grandchildren.

== Courses taught ==
- World Civilization
- Seminars to support World Civilization
- American Foreign Relations
- American Constitutional History
- American Survey Beginning to Civil War
- American Survey Civil War to Present
- Seminar on American Revolution
- Seminar on Civil War

He is a member of the Conference on Faith and History

== Research ==
- Wheaton College students in the Civil War
- Knox College students in the Civil War
- Early history of Wheaton College

== Papers published and/or presented ==
- Maas, David E., "Jonathan Blanchard." In Biographical Dictionary of Evangelicals, edited by Timothy Larsen. Leicester, England: Intervarsity Press, 2003.
- David E. Maas, "DuPage in the Civil War," panel researched and designed for When You Heard Your Country Calling: Illinois in the Civil War, Temporary Exhibit Gallery, Cantigny First Division Museum, June 2002-November 2003.
- David E. Maas, Divided Hearts: Massachusetts Loyalists, 1765-1790: A Biographical Directory(Online database: NewEnglandAncestors.org, New England Historic Genealogical Society, 2002), (Orig. Pub. by The Society of Colonial Wars in the Commonwealth of Massachusetts and The New England Historic Genealogical Society, Boston, MA. David E. Maas, Divided Hearts, Massachusetts Loyalists, 1765-1790 ( 1980).
- Maas, David E., "Selected Works." in Reading for Life, edited by Jeffry Davis et al. Philadelphia: Xlibris Corporation, 2001.
- Maas, David E. Review of Soldiering with Sherman: The Civil War Letters of George F. Cram, by Jennifer Cain Bohrnstedt. DuPage History 4 (2001): 5.
- David E. Maas, Wheaton College and the Coming of the Civil War (Wheaton History Center, forthcoming).
- Maas, David E., "Sources for Civil War Research." The Review: A Quarterly Publication of the DuPage County Genealogical Society 27 (2000): 2.
- Maas, David E., "1850 Census of DuPage County," The Review: A Quarterly Publication of the DuPage County Genealogical Society 27 (2000): 1.
- Maas, David E., "George Washington: The Founding Father of the American Presidency," In George Washington In and As Culture: Bicentenary Explorations, edited by Kevin L. Cope. Brooklyn: AMS Press, 2000.
- Maas, David E., Review of Jefferson's Declaration of Independence: Origins, Philosophy and Theology, by Allen Jayne. Journal of Church and State 41 (1999):148-149.
- Maas, David E. 8 biographies (Robert Auchmuty, Samuel Auchmuty, William Browne, John Draper, Richard Draper, Agnes Surriage Frankland, Charles Inglis, Joshua Loring in American National Biography. 24 volumes. editors John A. Garraty and Mark C. Carnes (New York: Oxford University Press, 1999)
- Maas, David E., Wheaton College Awakenings. Carol Stream, IL: Educational Publishing Concepts, 1996.
