= Paul Friedrich August Ascherson =

German botanist (1834-1913)

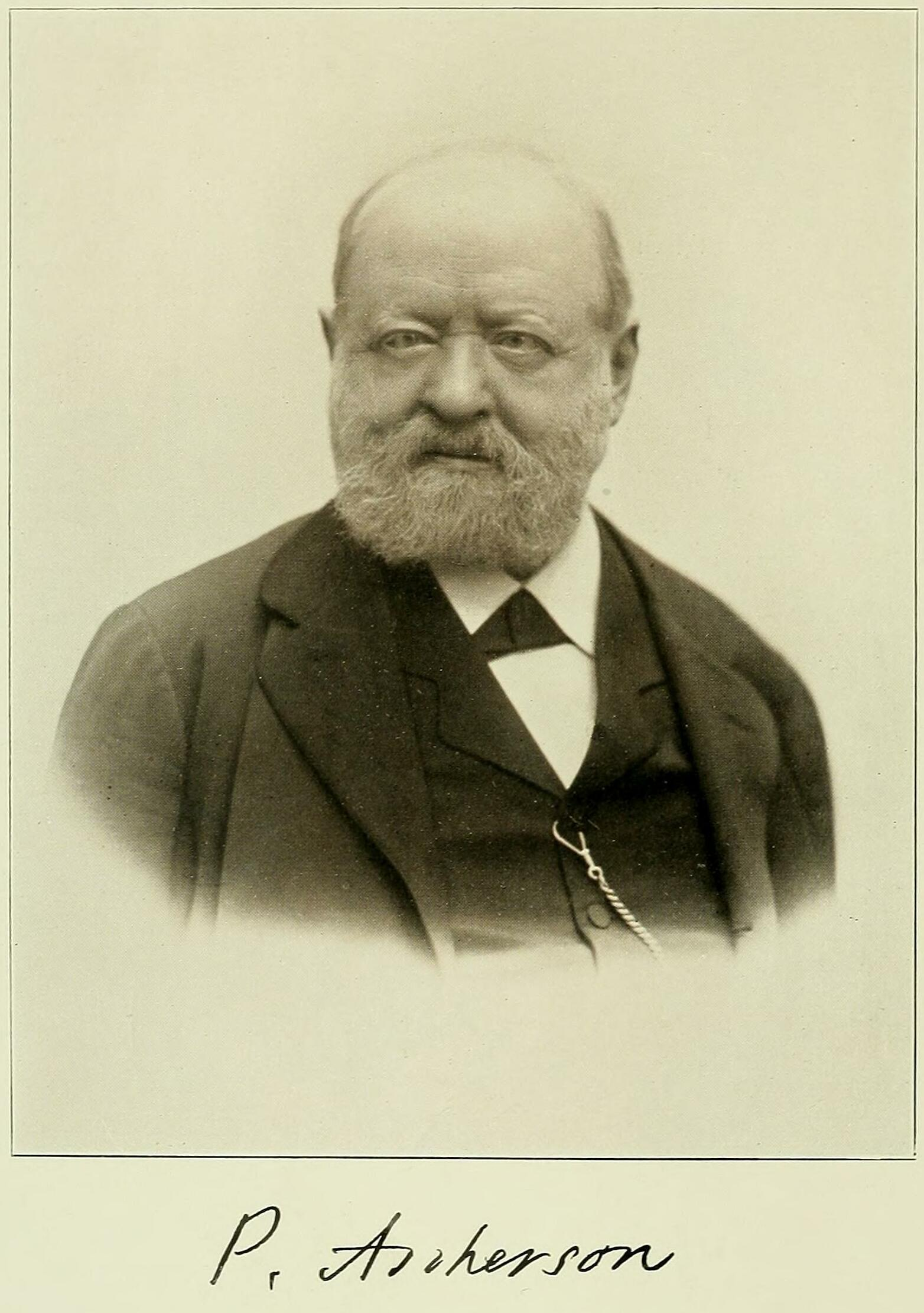
- Born: June 4, 1834; Berlin, Germany
- Died: March 6, 1913 (aged 78)
- Education: University of Berlin
- Known for: Flora of Brandenburg, Flora of Africa, Combining local observations for larger flora descriptions, Entomological collections
- Scientific career
- Fields: Botany, Entomology
- Workplaces: Botanical Garden in Berlin, Royal Herbarium, University of Berlin
- Author abbrev. (botany): Asch.

Paul Friedrich August Ascherson (June 4, 1834 – March 6, 1913) was a German botanist and professor at the University of Berlin. His author citation is Asch., although Aschers. has been used in the past.

Ascherson was born in Berlin in 1834, the son of physician and senior medical councillor Ferdinand Moritz and Henriette, née Odenheimer. After education at the Margraff boys school and the Friedrich-Werder Gymnasium he followed his father's wish to pursue medicine. In 1850, he started studying medicine at the University of Berlin, but soon started getting more interested in botany thanks to encouragement from Alexander Braun, Robert Caspary, and Nathanael Pringsheim. In 1855, he received his doctorate for a dissertation about the flora of the Margraviate of Brandenburg. In the 1850s, he started to botanize in Saxony, including several excursions with Ludwig Schneider and Gustav Maass. In 1860, Ascherson became an assistant at the Botanical Garden in Berlin; in 1865 he also started working at the Royal Herbarium. In 1863, he obtained his habilitation for specific botany and plant geography. In 1873, Ascherson became associate professor at the University of Berlin. He accompanied Friedrich Gerhard Rohlfs on his 1873–74 expedition in the Libyan desert. After 1876, he went on further expeditions, sometimes accompanied by G. A. Schweinfurth, in the middle east and northeastern Africa, publishing fundamental works about the flora of the continent. In the 1890s he botanized in Jerichower Land and in the Vorharz along with Paul Graebner.

Ascherson is known for combining works about the flora in certain localities with his own observations to write descriptions of the flora of a larger territory. He was also an entomologist. Insect collections made by him in Africa are conserved in Museum für Naturkunde in Berlin. He was also elected to honorary membership of the Manchester Literary and Philosophical Society.

In 1848 botanist Camille Montagne published Aschersonia, is a genus of fungi in the order Hypocreales and family Clavicipitaceae named in Ascherson's honour.

== Works ==
- Flora der Provinz Brandenburg, der Altmark und des Herzogthums Magdeburg. Zum gebrauche in schulen und auf excursionen. Berlin, August Hirschwald, 1864
- Catalogus cormophytorum et anthophytorum Serbiae, Bosniae, Hercegovinae, Montis Scodri, Albaniae hucusque cognitorum. Claudiopoli, Typ. N.K. Papp, 1877
- Synopsis der mitteleuropaïschen Flora. Leipzig : W. Engelmann, 1896
- Flora des nordostdeutschen flachlandes (ausser Ostpreussen). Berlin, Gebrüder Borntraeger, 1898–99
- Nordostdeutsche Schulflora : Tabellen zur Bestimmung der wildwachsenden und der häufiger angebauten Blüten- und Farnpflanzen der Provinzen Brandenburg, Pommern, Posen, Ost- und Westpreussen, und Sachsen (Nordhälfte), der Grossherzogtümer Mecklenburg und des Herzogtums Anhalt nach der Flora des nordostdeutschen Flachlandes. Berlin : Borntraeger, 1902
- Potamogetonaceae. Leipzig : Engelmann, 1907
