= Mutual Admiration Society =

Mutual Admiration Society may refer to:

- The Mutual Admiration Society, a literary society of women at Somerville College, Oxford
- "Mutual Admiration Society" (song), a song from the musical Happy Hunting
- Mutual Admiration Society (band), consisting of singer/songwriter Glen Phillips and bluegrass trio Nickel Creek
  - Mutual Admiration Society (album), a 2004 album by Mutual Admiration Society
- Mutual Admiration Society – Joe Locke & David Hazeltine Quartet, a 1999 album by Joe Locke and the David Hazeltine Quartet
