= Fred Maas =

Fredric J. Maas
- Born: 1957 (age 68–69); Rochester, New York, United States
- Education: Syracuse University College of Law, J.D Cum Laude; Hobart College, B.A.
- Occupations: Founder, Pacific EcoCompanies LLC; Chairman, Centre City Development Corporation (San Diego, CA)

Fred Maas (born 1957) is the Founder and CEO of Pacific EcoCompanies LLC, which specializes in investments in and development of sustainable buildings, communities and clean technologies. Also a San Diego resident, Maas works in the San Diego political, business and non-profit communities. Currently, he serves as Chief of Staff for the Los Angeles Chargers.

Maas graduated from Hobart College in 1979 where he majored in Political Science. Later, he graduated cum laude from Syracuse University College of Law in 1982. For over 30 years, Maas has participated in national, state and local politics, and worked for prominent political figures such as, John McCain, Bob Dole, Jack Kemp, Pete du Pont, Richard Lugar and Mitch Daniels.

== Environmental stewardship ==
From 2003 to 2009, Maas was President and CEO of Black Mountain Ranch LLC, Del Sur and Pacific Golf Communities LLC. His involvement in Black Mountain Ranch and The Ranch House at Del Sur, one of the highest rated Platinum LEED buildings in the nation.

His environmental work has been honored with Governor Arnold Schwarzenegger's Environmental and Economic Leadership Award in 2007, the National Association of Home Builder's Green Development of the Year Award in 2008, Urban Land Institute's (San Diego/Tijuana Chapter) Smart Growth Champion Award in 2008, the San Diego Excellence in Energy (SANDEE) award from the California Center for Sustainable Energy in 2007, San Diego Gas & Electric's Sustainable Communities Champion Award in 2007 and the California Integrated Waste Management Board's Waste Reduction Award.

== Civic activities in San Diego ==
Over the past 20 years, Maas has been involved with numerous civic activities in San Diego, CA, including chairman of the Centre City Development Corporation (CCDC), which oversees all redevelopment activities for the 1,500 acres (6.1 km^{2}) of downtown San Diego. Maas w as the interim CEO until 2010. In addition, he is on the Joint Powers Authority for North Embarcadero Visionary Plan, was the member of the City of San Diego's Task Force for the Location of a Permanent Homeless Shelter and the Mayor's task force for the Expansion of the San Diego Convention Center, and chaired the Candidate Selection Committee for the Redevelopment of the San Diego Civic Center and City Hall.

Additionally, Maas has sat on numerous non-profit boards: CleanTech San Diego, which promotes and fosters the development of sustainable businesses and practices in San Diego and Tijuana, and MOVE SAN DIEGO, which promotes transit alternatives in the region (formerly the San Diego Coalition for Transportation Choices, formed with the San Diego Chapter of the Sierra Club). In 2025, he joined the Board of Directors for the Del Mar Thoroughbred Club, after having been appointed to the California Horse Racing Board in 2017.

== Political activities ==
In 1983, Maas worked in the Office of the General Counsel and Research Director at the National Republican Senatorial Committee. Maas was Assistant Counsel to the Minority Leader of the New York State Assembly as well as Campaign Manager during the race for the U.S. Senate in Delaware in 1984. In 1988, Maas was New Hampshire Campaign Director for Governor Pete du Pont's presidential campaign

=== 2012 San Diego mayor race ===
Prior to the 2012 San Diego mayoral election, Maas and others spent more than $33,000 in an opposition research effort regarding then-candidate Carl DeMaio, a potential violation of campaign laws. The research was widely distributed to reporters, but went largely ignored, with the exception of the LGBT Weekly of San Diego.

These allegations were reviewed by both state and local election authorities who dismissed these claims with no finding of any wrongdoing, violations or political activity. DeMaio was soundly defeated.

== Project achievements ==
- 2008 - Black Mountain Ranch received a Green Development of the Year Award from National Association of Home Builders
- 2007 - Del Sur Property was named the winner of Governor Arnold Schwarzenegger's Environmental and Economic Leadership award in San Diego, California
- 2007 - Ranch House at Del Sur received San Diego's first Platinum rating for Leadership in Energy and Environmental Design (LEED) from the U.S. Green Building Council
- 2007 - Black Mountain Ranch LLC was awarded Special Achievement by a Small Business award by the California Center for Sustainable Energy
- 2007 - San Diego Gas & Electric's Sustainable Communities Champion Award
- 2007 - Black Mountain Ranch received California Integrated Waste Management Board's Waste Reduction Award
