= Ludwig Karl Eduard Schneider =

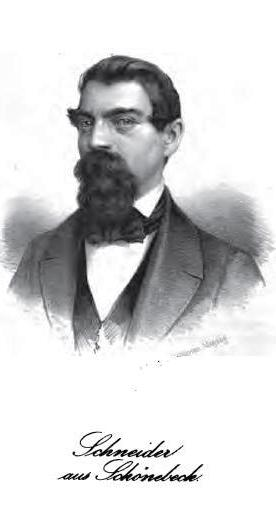
Ludwig Karl Eduard Schneider

Ludwig Karl Eduard Schneider (26 June 1809 in Sudenburg – 9 February 1889 in Schönebeck) was a German politician and botanist, known for his studies of flora native to what is now called Saxony-Anhalt.

He studied law and natural sciences at the University of Berlin, where one of his teachers was botanist Carl Sigismund Kunth. In 1844 he was elected mayor of Schönebeck, and from 1860, worked as a city councilor in Berlin. From 1861 to 1866 he was a member of the Deutsche Fortschrittspartei (German Progress Party) to the Prussian House of Representatives. In this position he was a decided opponent of Otto von Bismarck's policy. In 1870 he relocated to the town of Zerbst.

In 1866, with Paul Friedrich August Ascherson and others, he founded a naturalist association known as the Aller-Vereins ("Aller Society"). In Zerbst he served as chairman of Naturwissenschaftlichen Vereins ("Society of Natural Sciences").

== Published works ==
- Wanderungen durch die Florengebiete Zerbst, Möckern, Burg, Burgstall, Calvörde, Wolmirstedt, Barby und Bernburg, in: Abh. des Naturwissenschaftlichen Vereins Magdeburg, H. 4, 1873, 1–12 – Excursions through the floral areas of Zerbst, Möckern, Burg, Burgstall, Calvörde, Wolmirstedt, Barby and Bernburg.
- Wanderungen im Magdeburger Florengebiete im Jahre 1873, H. 6, 1874, 1–18 – Excursions in the Magdeburg floral areas in 1873.
- Schul-Flora Tl. 1: Grundzüge der allgemeinen Botanik, 1874 – Basics of general botany.
- Schul-Flora Tl. 2: Beschreibung der Gefäßpflanzen des Florengebiets von Magdeburg, Bernburg und Zerbst, mit einer Übersicht der Boden- und Vegetationsverhältnisse, 1877 – Description of vascular plants of the floral areas of Magdeburg, Bernburg and Zerbst, with an overview of the soil and vegetation conditions.
