= Mize =

Mize may refer to:

== People ==
- Billy Mize (1929–2017), American musician, TV show host
- Bob Mize (1907–2000), American Anglican bishop
- Casey Mize (born 1997), American professional baseball player
- Chester L. Mize (1917–1994), American politician
- Johnny Mize (1913–1993), American Major League Baseball player
- Larry Mize (born 1958), American golfer
- Ola L. Mize (1931–2014), retired US Army colonel and Medal of Honor recipient
- Verna Grahek Mize (1913–2013), American environmental activist

== Places in the United States ==
- Mize, Kentucky, an unincorporated community
- Mize, Georgia, an unincorporated community
- Mize, Mississippi, a town
