= List of UK top-ten singles in 2022 =

Chart of the top UK singles

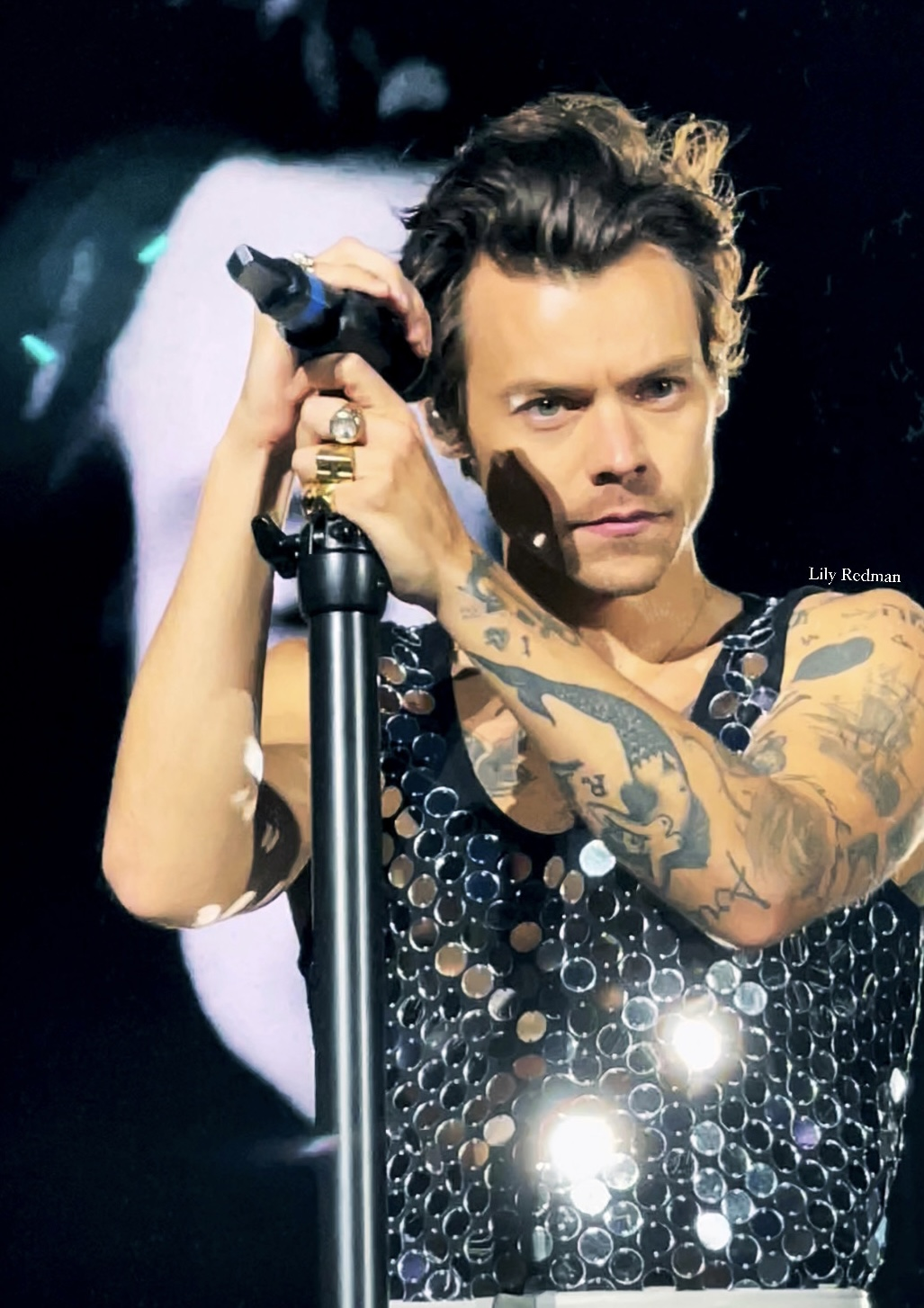
Harry Styles had the best-selling single of 2022 with "As It Was", which spent ten weeks at number-one. When the song debuted at the top of the charts, it recorded a career-best for Styles, achieving 94,000 chart sales and notching up 10.5 million streams during its first week of release. Styles had a further two top 10 entries this year, both of which charted in the top three.

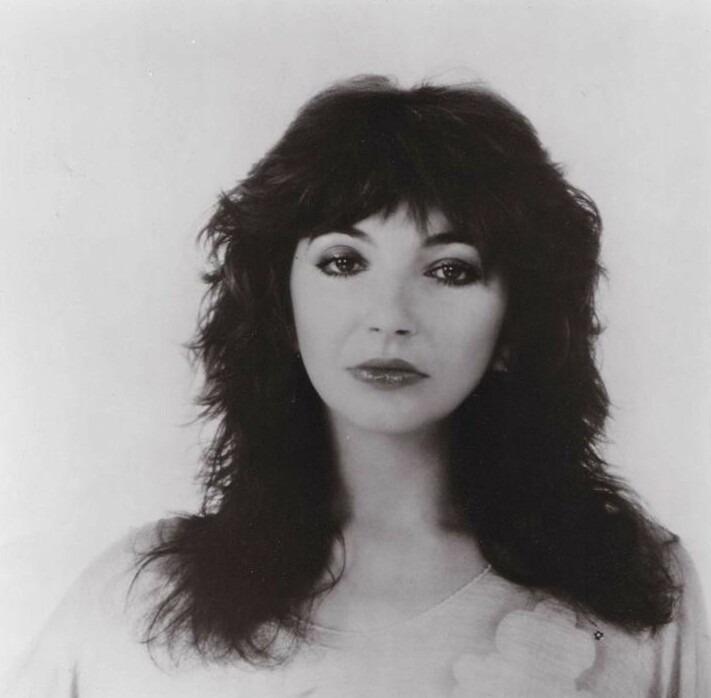
Kate Bush's 1985 hit single "Running Up That Hill" experienced renewed popularity worldwide this year after being prominently featured in the fourth season of Stranger Things. The song re-entered the UK Singles Chart at number eight on 9 June and climbed to number-one two weeks later, giving Bush her second UK number-one single, and her first since her 1978 debut hit "Wuthering Heights". Bush also set records by achieving the record of the longest time taken for a single to reach number-one in the UK chart, and also becoming the oldest living female artist ever to achieve a UK number-one single. "Running Up That Hill" ultimately became the sixth best selling single of this year.

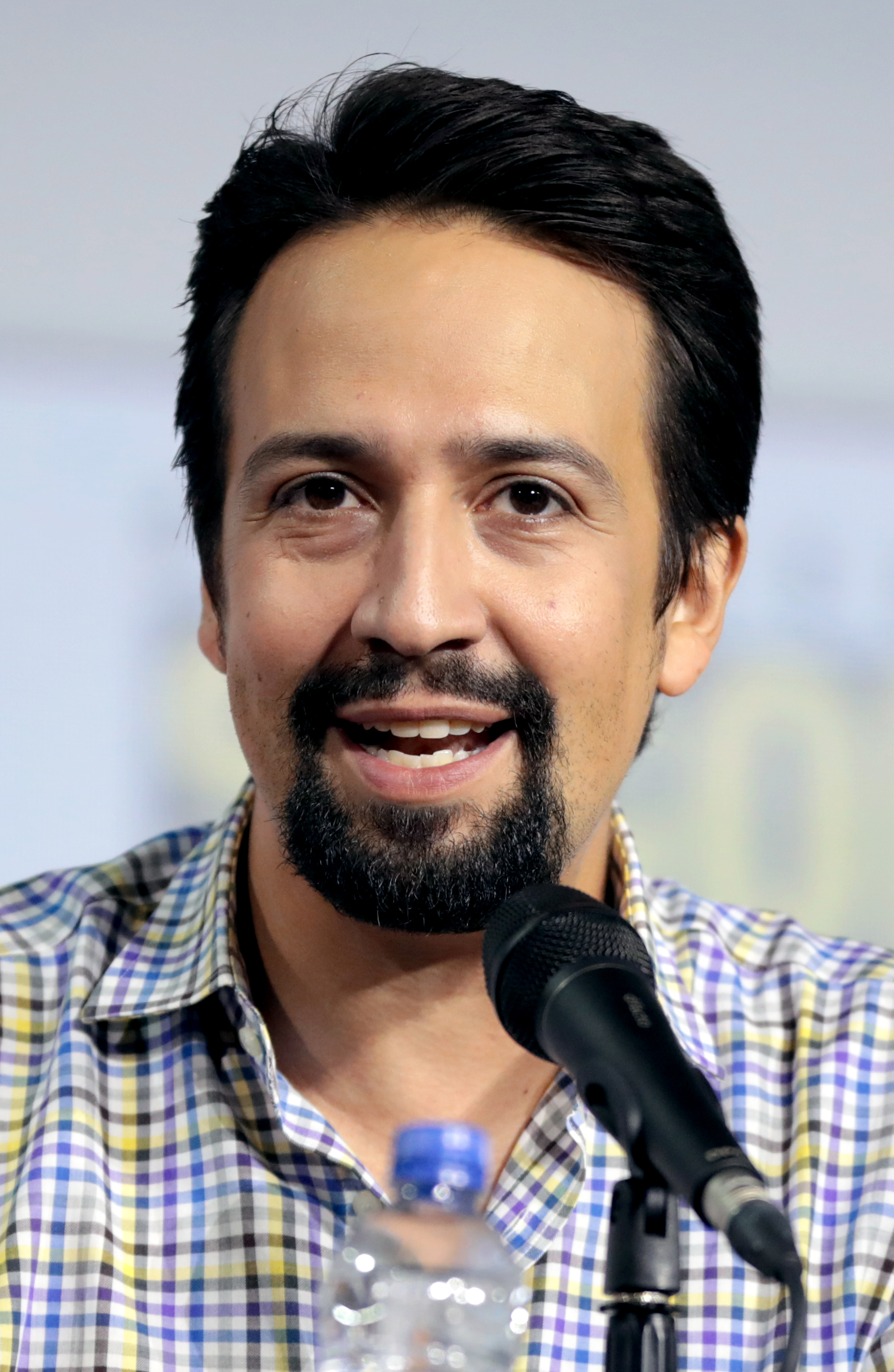
Lin-Manuel Miranda wrote and composed all of the songs from the soundtrack of the Disney film Encanto. Three of these songs charted in the UK top 10 in early 2022, including "We Don't Talk About Bruno", which topped the chart for seven weeks, and was also the first-ever original song from a Disney film to reach number-one in the UK.

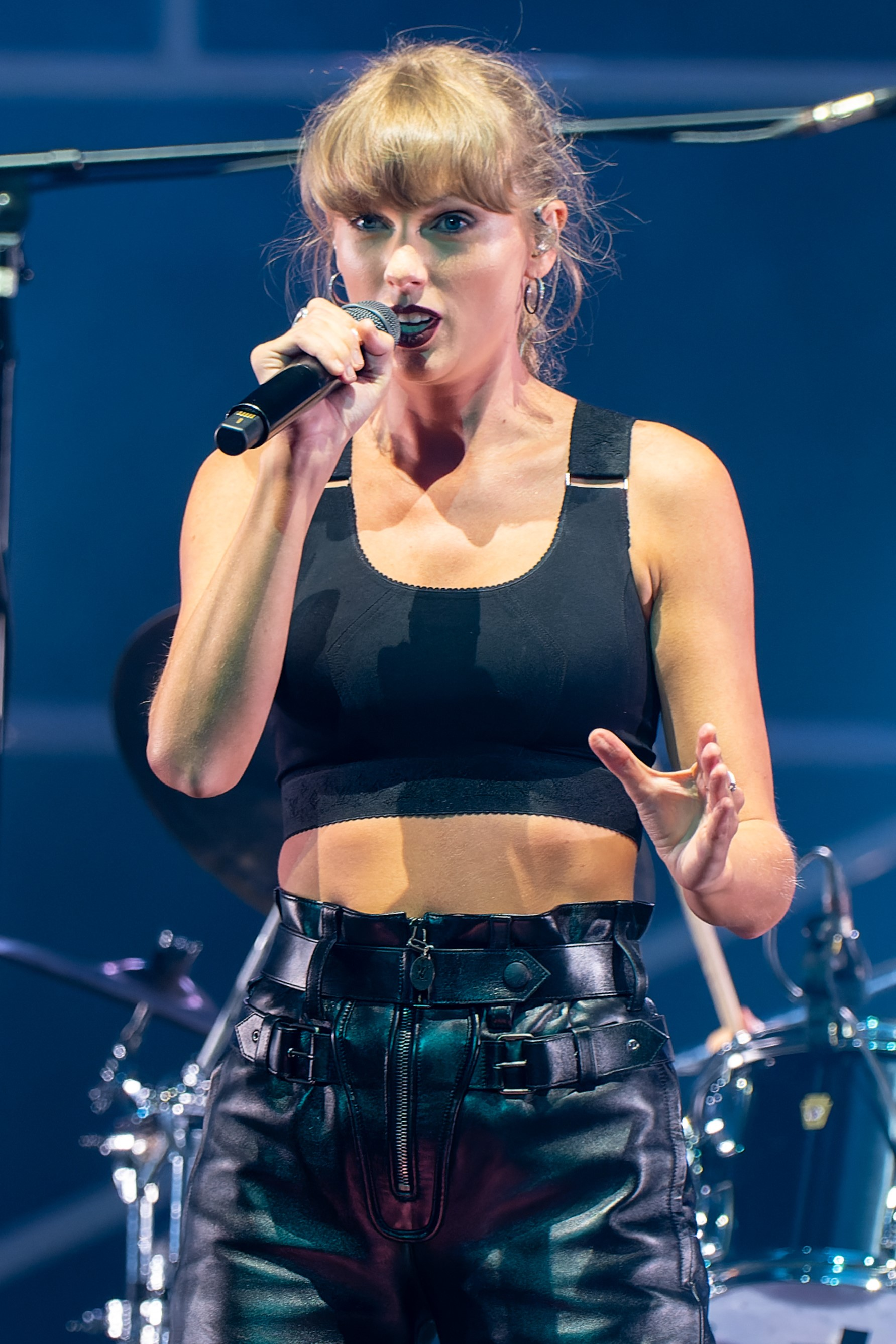
Taylor Swift secured three top 10 singles in 2022, including "Anti-Hero", which spent six weeks at number-one.

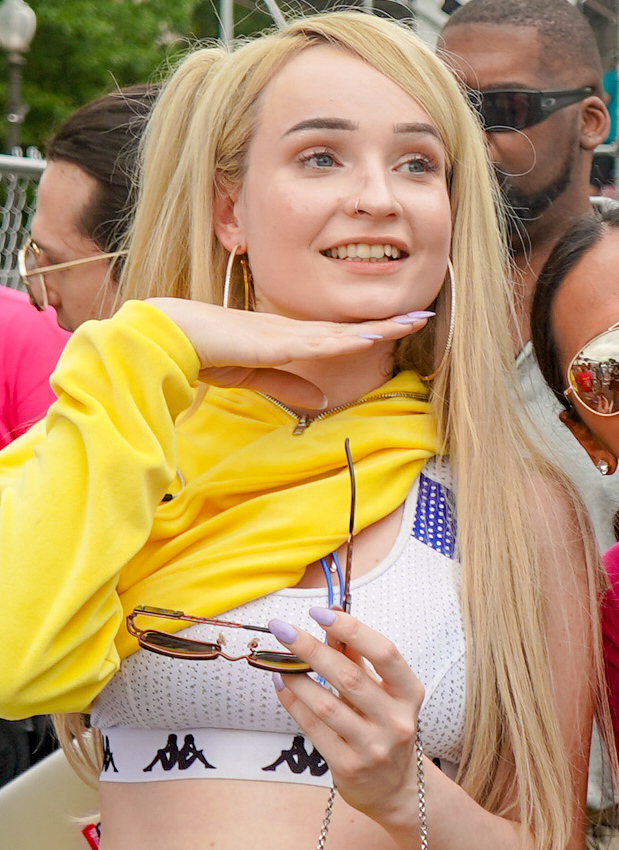
German singer Kim Petras made the UK top 10 for the only time this year thanks to her collaboration with Sam Smith on "Unholy", which topped the chart for four weeks.

The UK Singles Chart is one of many music charts compiled by the Official Charts Company that calculates the best-selling singles of the week in the United Kingdom. Since 2004 the chart has been based on the sales of both physical singles and digital downloads, with airplay figures excluded from the official chart. Since 2014, the singles chart has been based on both sales and streaming, with the ratio altered in 2017 to 150:1 streams and only three singles by the same artist eligible for the chart. From July 2018, video streams from YouTube Music and Spotify among others began to be counted for the Official Charts. This list shows singles that peaked in the Top 10 of the UK Singles Chart during 2022, as well as singles which peaked in 2021 and 2023 but were in the top 10 in 2022. The entry date is when the song appeared in the top 10 for the first time (week ending, as published by the Official Charts Company, which is six days after the chart is announced).

Ninety-four singles were in the top 10 this year. Fifteen singles from 2021 remained in the top 10 for several weeks at the beginning of the year, while "Calm Down" by Rema, "Escapism" by Raye featuring 070 Shake, "Firebabe" by Stormzy and "Let Go" by Central Cee were all released in 2022 but did not reach their peak until 2023. "Seventeen Going Under" by Sam Fender, "Coming for You" by SwitchOTR featuring A1 x J1, "Overseas" by D-Block Europe featuring Central Cee, "ABCDEFU" by Gayle, "All I Want for Christmas is You" by Mariah Carey, Last Christmas" by Wham! and "Come On Home for Christmas" by George Ezra were the songs from 2021 to reach their peak in 2022. "Rockin' Around the Christmas Tree" by Brenda Lee and "It's Beginning to Look a Lot Like Christmas" by Michael Bublé were both released in 2021 and re-entered the top 10 in 2022, but did not reach their peak until 2023. Acraze, Fireboy DML, Lauren Spencer-Smith, Jessica Darrow, Kim Petras and Luude were among the many artists who achieved their first top 10 single in 2022.

"Merry Christmas" by Ed Sheeran and Elton John returned to number-one for a third non-consecutive week during the first week of 2022, while Adele's "Easy on Me" clinched an eighth non-consecutive week at the top spot during the second week of 2022. The first new number-one single of the year was "ABCDEFU" by Gayle. Overall, fourteen different songs peaked at number-one in 2022, with fourteen unique artists hitting that position.

== Background ==
=== Multiple entries ===
Ninety-four singles charted in the top 10 in 2022, with eighty-six singles reaching their peak this year (including the re-entries "All I Want for Christmas Is You" and "Last Christmas", which charted in previous years but reached peaks on their latest chart run).

=== Encanto sets records ===
Three songs from the soundtrack of the Disney film Encanto charted within the top 10 of the UK Singles Chart this year; "We Don't Talk About Bruno", "Surface Pressure" and "The Family Madrigal". On 21 January 2022 (27 January 2022, week ending), "We Don't Talk About Bruno" rose to number-one, and remained there for seven consecutive weeks, and also made history by becoming the first-ever original song from a Disney film to reach number-one in the 70-year history of the UK Singles Chart. On 4 February 2022 (10 February 2022, week ending), after "The Family Madrigal" entered the top 10 at number seven, Encanto set another record by becoming the first Disney film to have three songs from its soundtrack reach the top 10 of the UK Singles Chart simultaneously.

=== Harry Styles returns to number-one and achieves career-best ===
On 8 April 2022 (14 April 2022, week ending), Harry Styles debuted at number-one in the UK Singles Chart with "As It Was", which became his second solo single to top that chart after 2017's "Sign of the Times". "As It Was" recorded a career-best for Styles, as it achieved 94,000 chart sales during its first week of release, the biggest opening week of any single in 2022 so far, as well as notching up 10.5 million streams, the biggest week of UK streams of any track so far during the year. "As It Was" also claimed the biggest first week of any song in the chart since LadBaby featuring Ed Sheeran and Elton John's "Sausage Rolls for Everyone" in December 2021.

=== Sam Ryder's "Space Man" becomes the highest-charting UK Eurovision entry since 1996 ===
On 20 May 2022 (26 May 2022 week ending), Sam Ryder climbed to number two in the UK Singles Chart with "Space Man", the United Kingdom's entry from the Eurovision Song Contest 2022. The song's chart success was attributed to its second-place finish at that year's competition. "Space Man" became the highest-charting UK Eurovision entry since Gina G's "Ooh Aah... Just a Little Bit", which reached number-one in 1996. Ryder also outperformed the last UK Eurovision winners to date, Katrina & The Waves, whose winning entry from 1997, "Love Shine a Light", peaked at number three.

=== Kate Bush's "Running Up That Hill" reaches number-one following use in Stranger Things, while Bush sets records ===
On 3 June 2022 (9 June 2022 week ending), Kate Bush's 1985 hit single "Running Up That Hill" re-entered the UK Singles Chart at number eight. The song had experienced renewed popularity worldwide after it was prominently featured in the fourth season of the Netflix series Stranger Things, and this resulted in it re-entering the charts of various countries. The following week, the song rose six places to a new chart peak of number two, overtaking its original peak position of number three. On 17 June 2022 (23 June 2022, week ending), "Running Up That Hill" topped the chart, giving Bush her second UK number-one single, and her first since her 1978 debut single "Wuthering Heights". In addition, Bush also set records by claiming the record of the longest time taken for a single to reach number-one in the UK chart, with "Running Up That Hill" topping the chart almost 37 years after its initial release, and also becoming the oldest female artist ever to score a UK number-one single at 63 years and 11 months old.

=== Eliza Rose reaches landmark number-one ===
On 2 September 2022 (8 September 2022 week ending), Eliza Rose and Interplanetary Criminal made chart history by becoming the 1400th number-one single with "B.O.T.A. (Baddest of Them All)". Rose also became the first female DJ to earn a number-one single in 22 years since "It Feels So Good" by Sonique reached the top position in May 2000. It was also the number one single in the United Kingdom on the day of the death of Queen Elizabeth II and ascention of King Charles III.

=== David Guetta returns to number-one with Eiffel 65 sample ===
On 23 September 2022 (29 September 2022 week ending), David Guetta and Bebe Rexha reached number one with "I'm Good (Blue)", which became Guetta's first UK number-one single in eight years and 7th overall, as well as Rexha's first chart-topper. The song samples "Blue (Da Ba Dee)" by Eiffel 65, which also reached number-one 23 years prior in September 1999.

=== Taylor Swift achieves prestigious Official Chart Double ===
On 28 October 2022 (3 November 2022, week ending), Taylor Swift achieved the prestigious chart double, topping both the UK Singles Chart and UK Albums Chart with "Anti-Hero" and Midnights, respectively. The song became Swift's first number-one since 2017 with "Look What You Made Me Do".

=== "All I Want for Christmas Is You" and "Last Christmas" return to number-one ===
December 2022 saw both Mariah Carey's "All I Want for Christmas Is You" and Wham!'s "Last Christmas" return to number-one in the UK Singles Chart, exactly two years after both songs first topped the chart.

On 9 December 2022 (15 December 2022, week ending), "All I Want for Christmas Is You" returned to number-one, having topped the chart for the very first time on 11 December 2020 (17 December 2020, week ending). In the seven days preceding its return to the top spot, the song notched up 10.8 million streams in the UK alone.

On 16 December 2022 (22 December 2022, week ending), "Last Christmas" returned to the top of the chart, having reached number-one for the first time ever on 1 January 2021 (7 January 2021, week ending). The song accumulated 11.4 million streams in the UK alone in the seven days preceding its return to the top spot.

=== LadBaby make history with fifth Christmas number-one ===
British blogger couple LadBaby made UK chart history on 23 December 2022 (29 December 2022, week ending), when they became the first-ever act to secure five Christmas number-one singles after their single "Food Aid" debuted at number-one in the UK Singles Chart. In doing so, they surpassed the record held by The Beatles, who secured four Christmas number-ones in 1963, 1964, 1965 and 1967. In its first week of release, "Food Aid" shifted a total of over 65,000 chart units.

=== Chart debuts ===
Thirty-four artists achieved their first charting top 10 single in 2022, either as a lead or featured artist. Of these, three went on to record another hit single in their breakthrough year: Cast of Encanto, Luude and Stephanie Beatriz.

The following table (collapsed on desktop site) does not include acts who had previously charted as part of a group and secured their first top 10 solo single.

Artist	Number of top 10s	First entry	Chart position	Other entries
Stephanie Beatriz	2	"We Don't Talk About Bruno"	1	"The Family Madrigal" (7)
Cast of Encanto	2	"We Don't Talk About Bruno"	1	"The Family Madrigal" (7)
Carolina Gaitán	1	"We Don't Talk About Bruno"	1	—
Mauro Castillo	1	"We Don't Talk About Bruno"	1	—
Adassa	1	"We Don't Talk About Bruno"	1	—
Rhenzy Feliz	1	"We Don't Talk About Bruno"	1	—
Diane Guerrero	1	"We Don't Talk About Bruno"	1	—
Fireboy DML	1	"Peru"	2	—
Acraze	1	"Do It to It"	9	—
Cherish	1	"Do It to It"	9	—
Lauren Spencer Smith	1	"Fingers Crossed"	4	—
Jessica Darrow	1	"Surface Pressure"	3	—
StillBrickin	1	"Pump 101"	9	—
Olga Merediz	1	"The Family Madrigal"	7	—
Belters Only	1	"Make Me Feel Good"	4	—
Jazzy	1	"Make Me Feel Good"	4	—
Luude	2	"Down Under"	5	"Big City Life" (8)
Dove Cameron	1	"Boyfriend"	9	—
Cat Burns	1	"Go"	2	—
Bad Boy Chiller Crew	1	"BMW"	7	—
Sam Ryder	1	"Space Man	2	—
Tems	1	"Wait for U"	8	—
Blxst	1	"Die Hard"	7	—
LF System	1	"Afraid to Feel"	1	—
Eliza Rose	1	"B.O.T.A. (Baddest Of Them All)"	1	—
Interplanetary Criminal	1	"B.O.T.A. (Baddest Of Them All)"	1	—
Miggy Dela Rosa	1	"Ferrari"	6	—
Kim Petras	1	"Unholy"	1	—
Steve Lacy	1	"Bad Habit"	8	—
Oliver Tree	1	"Miss You"	3	—
Venbee	1	"Messy in Heaven"	3	—
Goddard.	1	"Messy in Heaven"	3	—
Rema	1	"Calm Down"	3	—
070 Shake	1	"Escapism"	1	—

Notes

Colin Hay earned his UK top ten debut as a featured artist in February 2022 with "Down Under", although he was a former member of Men at Work. Amanda Reifer earned her UK top ten debut in May 2022 after featuring on "Die Hard", although she was a former member of Cover Drive.

=== Songs from films ===
Original songs from films charted in the top-ten throughout the year. These include "We Don't Talk About Bruno", "Surface Pressure" and "The Family Madrigal" (from Encanto), "I Ain't Worried" (from Top Gun: Maverick) and "Lift Me Up" (from Black Panther: Wakanda Forever).

=== Best-selling singles ===
Harry Styles had the best-selling single of the year with "As It Was". The song spent ten weeks at number-one, sold 1,550,000 copies and was certified 2× platinum by the BPI. "Bad Habits" by Ed Sheeran came in second place, while Fireboy DML and Ed Sheeran's "Peru", "Go" by Cat Burns and Ed Sheeran's "Shivers" made up the top five. Songs by Kate Bush, Glass Animals, Lost Frequencies featuring Calum Scott, LF System and Sam Fender were also in the top ten best-selling singles of the year.

== Top-ten singles ==
Key

Symbol	Meaning
‡	Single peaked in 2021 but still in chart in 2022.
♦	Single released in 2021 or 2022 but peaked in 2023.
(#)	Year-end top-ten single position and rank
Entered	The date that the single first appeared in the chart.
Peak	Highest position that the single reached in the UK Singles Chart.

Entered (week ending)	Weeks in top 10	Single	Artist	Peak	Peak reached (week ending)	Weeks at peak
Singles in 2021
23 September 2021	12	"Shivers" ‡ (#5) ^{[P]}	Ed Sheeran	1	23 September 2021	4
28 October 2021	13	"Easy on Me" ‡ ^{[J]}	Adele	1	28 October 2021	8
18 November 2021	7	"Flowers (Say My Name)" ‡ ^{[N]}^{[Q]}	ArrDee	5	18 November 2021	2
25 November 2021	14	"Seventeen Going Under" (#10) ^{[F]}^{[L]}	Sam Fender	3	13 January 2022	1
25 November 2021	4	"Coming for You" ^{[M]}	SwitchOTR featuring A1 x J1	5	13 January 2022	1
2 December 2021	12	"Overseas" ^{[O]}	D-Block Europe featuring Central Cee	6	10 February 2022	1
9 December 2021	10	"ABCDEFU" ^{[K]}	Gayle	1	20 January 2022	1
9 December 2021	10	"All I Want for Christmas Is You" ^{[A]}^{[VV]}	Mariah Carey	1	15 December 2022	1
9 December 2021	10	"Last Christmas" ^{[B]}^{[WW]}	Wham!	1	22 December 2022	2
16 December 2021	8	"Merry Christmas" ‡ ^{[XX]}	Ed Sheeran & Elton John	1	16 December 2021	3
16 December 2021	8	"Rockin' Around the Christmas Tree" ♦ ^{[C]}^{[YY]}	Brenda Lee	4	5 January 2023	1
16 December 2021	4	"Merry Christmas Everyone" ‡ ^{[D]}	Shakin' Stevens	6	16 December 2021	3
16 December 2021	6	"Fairytale of New York" ‡ ^{[E]}^{[AAA]}^{[DDD]}	The Pogues featuring Kirsty MacColl	4	6 January 2022	1
16 December 2021	6	"It's Beginning to Look a Lot Like Christmas" ♦ ^{[G]}^{[ZZ]}^{[CCC]}	Michael Bublé	6	5 January 2023	1
30 December 2021	2	"Come On Home for Christmas"	George Ezra	8	6 January 2022	1
Singles in 2022
6 January 2022	1	"It's the Most Wonderful Time of the Year" ^{[H]}	Andy Williams	9	6 January 2022	1
6 January 2022	1	"Driving Home for Christmas" ^{[I]}	Chris Rea	10	6 January 2022	1
13 January 2022	10	"We Don't Talk About Bruno"	Carolina Gaitán, Mauro Castillo, Adassa, Rhenzy Feliz, Diane Guerrero, Stephanie Beatriz & cast of Encanto	1	27 January 2022	7
13 January 2022	22	"Peru" (#3)	Fireboy DML & Ed Sheeran	2	3 February 2022	6
13 January 2022	1	"Do It to It"	Acraze featuring Cherish	9	13 January 2022	1
20 January 2022	3	"Fingers Crossed"	Lauren Spencer Smith	4	20 January 2022	1
20 January 2022	8	"Surface Pressure"	Jessica Darrow	3	17 February 2022	2
20 January 2022	1	"Sacrifice"	The Weeknd	10	20 January 2022	1
3 February 2022	12	"Where Are You Now" (#8)	Lost Frequencies featuring Calum Scott	3	10 March 2022	2
3 February 2022	1	"Pump 101"	Digga D & StillBrickin	9	3 February 2022	1
10 February 2022	5	"The Family Madrigal"	Stephanie Beatriz, Olga Merediz & cast of Encanto	7	10 February 2022	1
10 February 2022	14	"Make Me Feel Good"	Belters Only featuring Jazzy	4	10 March 2022	2
10 February 2022	10	"Down Under" ^{[S]}^{[X]}	Luude featuring Colin Hay	5	17 March 2022	1
17 February 2022	1	"War"	ArrDee & Aitch	6	17 February 2022	1
24 February 2022	1	"The Joker and the Queen" ^{[R]}	Ed Sheeran	2	24 February 2022	1
3 March 2022	4	"House on Fire" ^{[U]}	Mimi Webb	6	3 March 2022	1
17 March 2022	11	"Starlight"	Dave	1	17 March 2022	4
17 March 2022	10	"Where Did You Go?"	Jax Jones & MNEK	7	24 March 2022	2
24 March 2022	10	"Baby"	Aitch featuring Ashanti	2	24 March 2022	3
24 March 2022	1	"Boyfriend"	Dove Cameron	9	24 March 2022	1
24 March 2022	17	"Go" (#4)	Cat Burns	2	9 June 2022	1
31 March 2022	3	"BMW" ^{[T]}^{[Y]}	Bad Boy Chiller Crew	7	5 May 2022	1
7 April 2022	8	"Bam Bam" ^{[V]}^{[Z]}	Camila Cabello featuring Ed Sheeran	7	12 May 2022	1
14 April 2022	37	"As It Was" (#1) ^{[MMM]}^{[PPP]}	Harry Styles	1	14 April 2022	10
21 April 2022	9	"First Class"	Jack Harlow	2	21 April 2022	5
12 May 2022	2	"Wait for U"	Future featuring Drake & Tems	8	12 May 2022	2
19 May 2022	13	"About Damn Time"	Lizzo	3	9 June 2022	1
26 May 2022	4	"Space Man" ^{[BB]}	Sam Ryder	2	26 May 2022	1
26 May 2022	1	"N95"	Kendrick Lamar	6	26 May 2022	1
26 May 2022	1	"Die Hard"	Kendrick Lamar with Blxst & Amanda Reifer	7	26 May 2022	1
2 June 2022	8	"Late Night Talking" ^{[KK]}^{[MM]}	Harry Styles	2	2 June 2022	1
2 June 2022	3	"Music for a Sushi Restaurant" ^{[CC]}	Harry Styles	3	2 June 2022	1
2 June 2022	9	"IFTK" ^{[EE]}^{[JJ]}	Tion Wayne & La Roux	6	16 June 2022	1
9 June 2022	10	"Running Up That Hill" (#6) ^{[AA]}	Kate Bush	1	23 June 2022	3
9 June 2022	2	"2step"	Ed Sheeran	9	9 June 2022	1
16 June 2022	14	"Green Green Grass" ^{[OOO]}	George Ezra	3	21 July 2022	4
23 June 2022	12	"Afraid to Feel" (#9)	LF System	1	14 July 2022	8
30 June 2022	1	"Jimmy Cooks"	Drake featuring 21 Savage	7	30 June 2022	1
30 June 2022	3	"Massive"	Drake	8	30 June 2022	2
30 June 2022	1	"Falling Back"	Drake	10	30 June 2022	1
7 July 2022	9	"Break My Soul"	Beyoncé	2	11 August 2022	2
14 July 2022	3	"21 Reasons"	Nathan Dawe featuring Ella Henderson	9	28 July 2022	1
21 July 2022	5	"Last Last" ^{[GG]}	Burna Boy	4	28 July 2022	1
21 July 2022	9	"Crazy What Love Can Do" ^{[HH]}	David Guetta, Becky Hill & Ella Henderson	5	25 August 2022	1
4 August 2022	7	"Doja" ^{[OO]}	Central Cee	2	4 August 2022	1
11 August 2022	13	"I Ain't Worried"	OneRepublic	3	15 September 2022	1
18 August 2022	6	"Not Over Yet" ^{[LL]}	KSI featuring Tom Grennan	4	18 August 2022	2
18 August 2022	9	"B.O.T.A. (Baddest of Them All)"	Eliza Rose & Interplanetary Criminal	1	8 September 2022	2
25 August 2022	8	"Ferrari"	James Hype & Miggy Dela Rosa	6	29 September 2022	1
25 August 2022	1	"Stay with Me"	Calvin Harris, Justin Timberlake, Halsey & Pharrell Williams	10	25 August 2022	1
1 September 2022	1	"My G"	Aitch featuring Ed Sheeran	6	1 September 2022	1
1 September 2022	8	"Super Freaky Girl" ^{[NN]}	Nicki Minaj	5	22 September 2022	2
8 September 2022	3	"Hold Me Closer"	Elton John & Britney Spears	3	8 September 2022	1
8 September 2022	9	"I'm Good (Blue)"	David Guetta & Bebe Rexha	1	29 September 2022	1
8 September 2022	5	"Big City Life" ^{[PP]}^{[QQ]}	Luude & Mattafix	8	6 October 2022	1
22 September 2022	12	"Forget Me" ^{[NNN]}	Lewis Capaldi	1	22 September 2022	1
22 September 2022	6	"Under the Influence"	Chris Brown	7	6 October 2022	2
6 October 2022	9	"Unholy"	Sam Smith & Kim Petras	1	6 October 2022	4
6 October 2022	3	"Bad Habit"	Steve Lacy	8	20 October 2022	1
13 October 2022	1	"Celestial"	Ed Sheeran	6	13 October 2022	1
13 October 2022	4	"Cuff It" ^{[RR]}	Beyoncé	5	20 October 2022	2
20 October 2022	7	"Psycho" ^{[SS]}	Anne-Marie & Aitch	5	8 December 2022	1
27 October 2022	7	"Hide & Seek"	Stormzy	7	27 October 2022	4
27 October 2022	11	"Miss You" ^{[JJJ]}^{[LLL]}	Robin Schulz & Oliver Tree	3	24 November 2022	1
3 November 2022	15	"Anti-Hero" ^{[FFF]}	Taylor Swift	1	3 November 2022	6
3 November 2022	2	"Lavender Haze"	Taylor Swift	3	3 November 2022	1
3 November 2022	2	"Snow on the Beach"	Taylor Swift featuring Lana Del Rey	4	3 November 2022	1
10 November 2022	2	"Lift Me Up" ^{[TT]}	Rihanna	3	10 November 2022	1
17 November 2022	4	"Rich Flex"	Drake & 21 Savage	3	17 November 2022	1
17 November 2022	1	"Major Distribution"	Drake & 21 Savage	5	17 November 2022	1
17 November 2022	1	"Circo Loco"	Drake & 21 Savage	7	17 November 2022	1
17 November 2022	8	"Made You Look" ^{[HHH]}	Meghan Trainor	2	8 December 2022	1
17 November 2022	13	"Messy in Heaven" ^{[GGG]}	Venbee & Goddard.	3	8 December 2022	2
24 November 2022	27	"Calm Down" ♦ ^{[KKK]}	Rema	3	8 June 2023	1
1 December 2022	1	"Rocket Science"	Clavish featuring D-Block Europe	9	1 December 2022	1
8 December 2022	12	"Escapism" ♦ ^{[EEE]}	Raye featuring 070 Shake	1	12 January 2023	1
15 December 2022	4	"Firebabe" ♦	Stormzy	5	5 January 2023	1
29 December 2022	1	"Food Aid"	LadBaby	1	29 December 2022	1
29 December 2022	1	"Christmas Drillings"	Sidemen	3	29 December 2022	1
29 December 2022	1	"Fuck the Tories"	The Kunts	7	29 December 2022	1
29 December 2022	6	"Let Go" ♦ ^{[III]}	Central Cee	6	12 January 2023	3

== Entries by artist ==
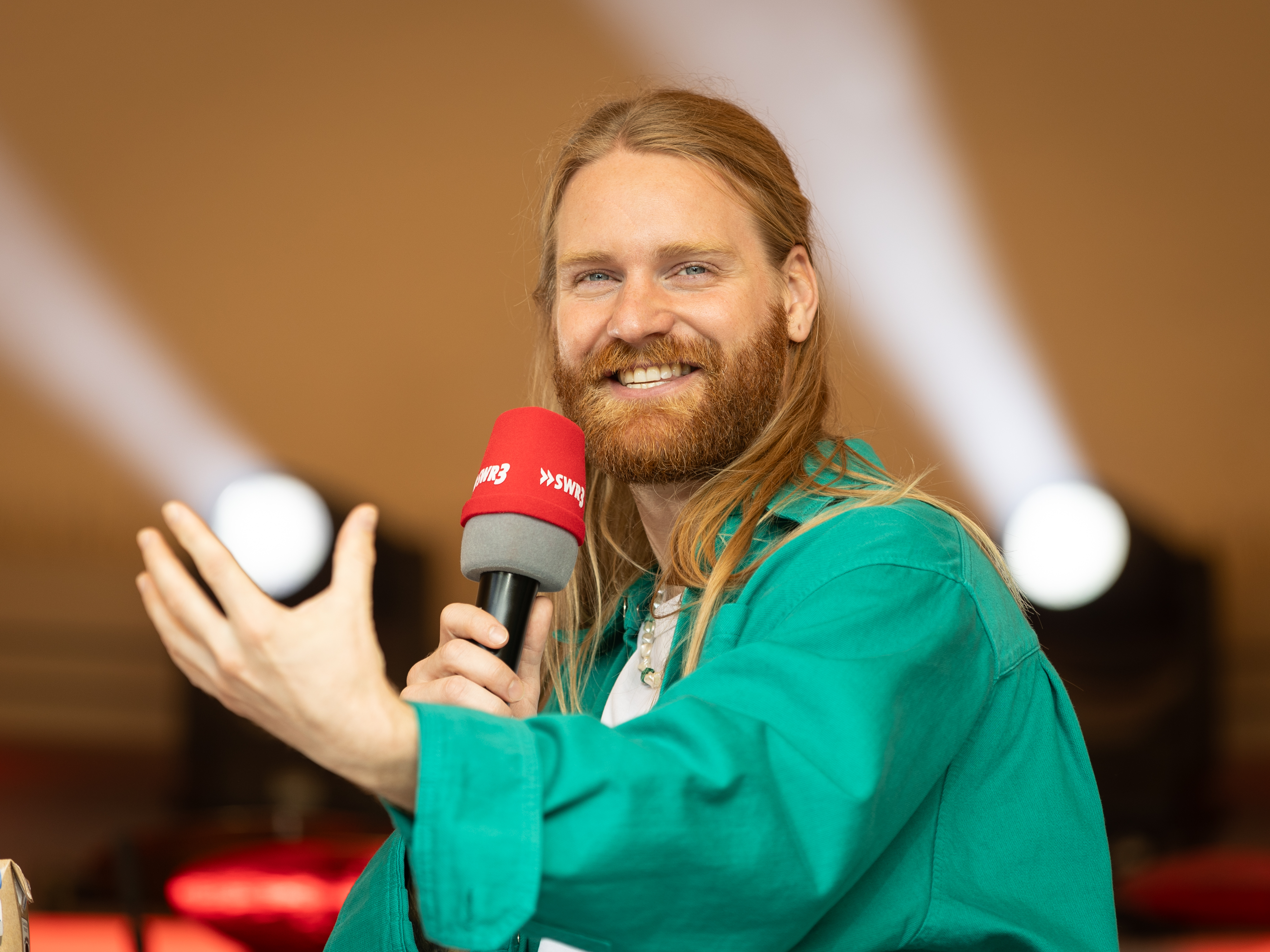
Sam Ryder represented the United Kingdom at the Eurovision Song Contest 2022 with "Space Man", which peaked at number two following its second-place finish at the competition. "Space Man" also became the highest-charting UK Eurovision entry since Gina G's "Ooh Aah... Just a Little Bit", which reached number-one in 1996.

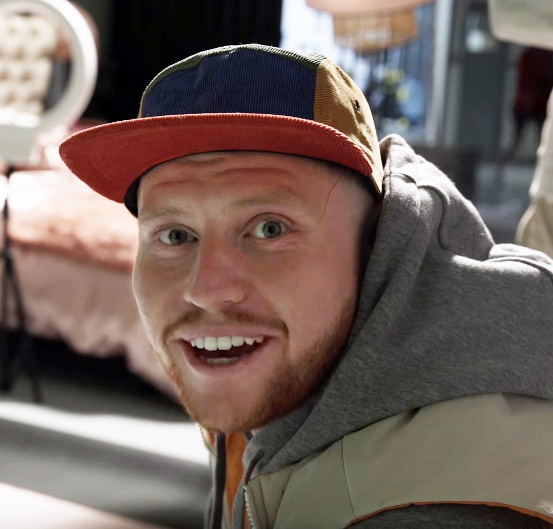
Behzinga was a member of YouTube group Sidemen, whose single "Christmas Drillings" became a surprise hit, reaching number three in the UK in December of this year.

The following table shows artists who have achieved two or more top 10 entries in 2022, including singles that reached their peak in 2021. The figures include both main artists and featured artists, while appearances on ensemble charity records are also counted for each artist. The total number of weeks an artist spent in the top ten in 2022 is also shown.

Entries	Artist	Weeks	Singles
8	Ed Sheeran ^{[W]}	28	"Shivers", "Merry Christmas", "Peru", "The Joker and the Queen", "Bam Bam", "2step", "My G", "Celestial"
7	Drake ^{[DD]}	9	"Wait for U", "Jimmy Cooks", "Massive", "Falling Back", "Rich Flex", "Major Distribution", "Circo Loco"
4	Aitch	18	"War", "Baby", "My G", "Psycho"
4	21 Savage	5	"Jimmy Cooks", "Rich Flex", "Major Distribution", "Circo Loco"
3	Taylor Swift	15	"Anti-Hero", "Lavender Haze", "Snow on the Beach"
3	Central Cee ^{[II]}	19	"Overseas", "Doja", "Let Go"
3	Harry Styles	20	"As It Was", "Late Night Talking", "Music for a Sushi Restaurant"
2	D-Block Europe ^{[UU]}	12	"Overseas", "Rocket Science"
2	George Ezra	14	"Come On Home for Christmas", "Green Green Grass"
2	Ella Henderson ^{[FF]}	10	"21 Reasons", "Crazy What Love Can Do"
2	Elton John	7	"Merry Christmas", "Hold Me Closer"
2	ArrDee	3	"Flowers (Say My Name)", "War"
2	KSI ^{[BBB]}	7	"Not Over Yet", "Christmas Drillings"
2	Stormzy	11	"Hide & Seek", "Firebabe"
2	Beyoncé	13	"Break My Soul", "Cuff It"
2	Stephanie Beatriz	10	"We Don't Talk About Bruno", "The Family Madrigal"
2	Cast of Encanto	10	"We Don't Talk About Bruno", "The Family Madrigal"
2	Kendrick Lamar	1	"N95", "Die Hard"
2	David Guetta	18	"Crazy What Love Can Do", "I'm Good (Blue)"
2	Luude	15	"Down Under", "Big City Life"

== Notes ==
- ^{a} "All I Want for Christmas Is You" re-entered the top 10 at number 3 on 9 December 2021 (week ending). The song originally peaked at number 2 upon its initial release in 1994 and reached number-one for the first time ever on 17 December 2020 (week ending).
- ^{b} "Last Christmas" re-entered the top 10 at number 4 on 9 December 2021 (week ending). The song originally peaked at number 2 upon its initial release in 1984 and reached number-one for the first time ever on 7 January 2021 (week ending).
- ^{c} "Rockin' Around the Christmas Tree" re-entered the top 10 at number 10 on 16 December 2021 (week ending), having originally peaked at number 6 upon release in 1962. It reached a new peak of number 5 on 6 January 2022 (week ending).
- ^{d} "Merry Christmas Everyone" re-entered the top 10 at number 6 on 16 December 2021 (week ending), having originally peaked at number 1 upon release in 1985.
- ^{e} "Fairytale of New York" re-entered the top 10 at number 7 on 16 December 2021 (week ending), having originally peaked at number 2 upon release in 1987.
- ^{f} "Seventeen Going Under" re-entered the top 10 at number 9 on 23 December 2021 (week ending).
- ^{g} "It's Beginning to Look A lot Like Christmas" re-entered the top 10 at number 7 on 6 January 2022 (week ending).
- ^{h} "It's the Most Wonderful Time of the Year" first charted at number 21 in 2007.
- ^{i} "Driving Home for Christmas" first charted at number 53 upon release in 1988.
- ^{j} "Easy on Me" re-entered the top 10 at number-one on 13 January 2022 (week ending).
- ^{k} "ABCDEFU" re-entered the top 10 at number 2 on 13 January 2022 (week ending).
- ^{l} "Seventeen Going Under" re-entered the top 10 at number 3 on 13 January 2022 (week ending).
- ^{m} "Coming for You" re-entered the top 10 at number 5 on 13 January 2022 (week ending).
- ^{n} "Flowers (Say My Name)" re-entered the top 10 at number 7 on 13 January 2022 (week ending).
- ^{o} "Overseas" re-entered the top 10 at number 8 on 13 January 2022 (week ending).
- ^{p} "Shivers" re-entered the top 10 at number 10 on 13 January 2022 (week ending).
- ^{q} "Flowers (Say My Name)" re-entered the top 10 at number 10 on 27 January 2022 (week ending).
- ^{r} "The Joker and the Queen" debuted at number 2 in the UK Singles Chart on 24 February 2022 (week ending) following the release of the remix featuring Taylor Swift.
- ^{s} "Down Under" re-entered the top 10 at number 10 on 24 February 2022 (week ending).
- ^{t} "BMW" entered the top 10 at number 9 on 31 March 2022 (week ending) following the release of the remix featuring French the Kid, Mist and Bugzy Malone.
- ^{u} "House on Fire" re-entered the top 10 at number 10 on 31 March 2022 (week ending).
- ^{v} "Bam Bam" entered the top 10 at number 10 on 7 April 2022 (week ending) following Cabello and Sheeran's performance on Concert for Ukraine.
- ^{w} Figure includes a feature on "Bam Bam".
- ^{x} "Down Under" re-entered the top 10 at number 10 on 28 April 2022 (week ending).
- ^{y} "BMW" re-entered the top 10 at number 7 on 5 May 2022 (week ending).
- ^{z} "Bam Bam" re-entered the top 10 at number 9 on 2 June 2022 (week ending).
- ^{aa} "Running Up That Hill" originally peaked at number 3 upon its initial release in 1985. It re-entered the top 10 at number 8 on 9 June 2022 (week ending), having experienced renewed popularity worldwide after it was prominently featured in the fourth season of Stranger Things. The following week, the song rose to a new peak position of number 2. It topped the chart a week later, giving Kate Bush her first number-one single since 1978.
- ^{bb} "Space Man" re-entered the top 10 at number 5 on 16 June 2022 (week ending), following Ryder's performance at the Platinum Jubilee concert, Platinum Party at the Palace.
- ^{cc} "Music for a Sushi Restaurant" re-entered the top 10 at number 10 on 23 June 2022 (week ending).
- ^{dd} Figure includes a feature on "Wait for U".
- ^{ee} "IFTK" re-entered the top 10 at number 9 on 7 July 2022 (week ending).
- ^{ff} Figure includes a feature on "21 Reasons".
- ^{gg} "Last Last" entered the top 10 at number 7 on 21 July 2022 (week ending) following the release of the album Love, Damini.
- ^{hh} "Crazy What Love Can Do" entered the top 10 at number 8 on 21 July 2022 (week ending) following Hill's performance on Love Island.
- ^{ii} Figure includes a feature on "Overseas".
- ^{jj} "IFTK" re-entered the top 10 at number 10 on 4 August 2022 (week ending).
- ^{kk} "Late Night Talking" re-entered the top 10 at number 8 on 18 August 2022 (week ending).
- ^{ll} "Not Over Yet" re-entered the top 10 at number 6 on 8 September 2022 (week ending), following the release of the remix featuring Headie One and Nines.
- ^{mm} "Late Night Talking" re-entered the top 10 at number 5 on 15 September 2022 (week ending).
- ^{nn} "Super Freaky Girl" re-entered the top 10 at number 6 on 15 September 2022 (week ending).
- ^{oo} "Doja" re-entered the top 10 at number 8 on 22 September 2022 (week ending).
- ^{pp} "Big City Life" re-entered the top 10 at number 9 on 29 September 2022 (week ending).
- ^{qq} "Big City Life" re-entered the top 10 at number 10 on 20 October 2022 (week ending).
- ^{rr} "Cuff It" re-entered the top 10 at number 9 on 10 November 2022 (week ending).
- ^{ss} "Psycho" re-entered the top 10 at number 7 on 24 November 2022 (week ending).
- ^{tt} "Lift Me Up" re-entered the top 10 at number 9 on 24 November 2022 (week ending).
- ^{uu} Figure includes a feature on "Rocket Science".
- ^{vv} "All I Want fot Christmas Is You" re-entered the top 10 at number 8 on 8 December 2022 (week ending). The song returned to number-one on 15 December 2022 (week ending).
- ^{ww} "Last Christmas" re-entered the top 10 at number 9 on 8 December 2022 (week ending). The song returned to number-one on 22 December 2022 (week ending).
- ^{xx} "Merry Christmas" re-entered the top 10 at number 4 on 15 December 2022 (week ending).
- ^{yy} "Rockin' Around the Christmas Tree" re-entered the top 10 at number 6 on 15 December 2022 (week ending). It reached a new peak of number 4 on 5 January 2023 (week ending).
- ^{zz} "It's Beginning to Look A lot Like Christmas" re-entered the top 10 at number 10 on 15 December 2022 (week ending).
- ^{aaa} "Fairytale of New York" re-entered the top 10 at number 9 on 22 December 2022 (week ending).
- ^{bbb} Figure includes a feature on "Christmas Drillings".
- ^{ccc} "It's Beginning to Look A lot Like Christmas" re-entered the top 10 at its new peak of number 6 on 5 January 2023 (week ending).
- ^{ddd} "Fairytale of New York" re-entered the top 10 at number 9 on 5 January 2023 (week ending).
- ^{eee} "Escapism" re-entered the top 10 at number-one on 12 January 2023 (week ending).
- ^{fff} "Anti-Hero" re-entered the top 10 at number 2 on 12 January 2023 (week ending).
- ^{ggg} "Messy in Heaven" re-entered the top 10 at number 3 on 12 January 2023 (week ending).
- ^{hhh} "Made You Look" re-entered the top 10 at number 5 on 12 January 2023 (week ending).
- ^{iii} "Let Go" re-entered the top 10 at number 6 on 12 January 2023 (week ending).
- ^{jjj} "Miss You" re-entered the top 10 at number 7 on 12 January 2023 (week ending).
- ^{kkk} "Calm Down" re-entered the top 10 at number 8 on 12 January 2023 (week ending).
- ^{lll} "Miss You" re-entered the top 10 at number 10 on 9 February 2023 (week ending).
- ^{mmm} "As It Was" re-entered the top 10 at number 7 on 23 February 2023 (week ending), following Styles' success and performance of the song at the Brit Awards 2023.
- ^{nnn} re-entered the top 10 at number 8 on 20 April 2023 (week ending), following the release of Capaldi's Netflix documentary Lewis Capaldi: How I'm Feeling Now.
- ^{ooo} "Green Green Grass" re-entered the top 10 at number 9 on 20 April 2023 (week ending).
- ^{ppp} "As It Was" re-entered the top 10 at number 10 on 1 June 2023 (week ending) after Styles embarked on his final leg of shows in the UK of Love On Tour.
