= List of top 10 singles in 2022 (Ireland) =

This is a list of singles that have peaked in the top 10 of the Irish Singles Chart in 2022, as compiled by the Official Charts Company on behalf of the Irish Recorded Music Association.

== Top-ten singles ==
Key

Symbol	Meaning
◁	Indicates single's top 10 entry was also its Irish Singles Chart top 100 debut

Artist(s)	Single	Peak	Peak date	Weeks at #1	Ref.
Gayle	"ABCDEFU"	1	7 January	3	
Acraze featuring Cherish	"Do It to It"	3	7 January	-	
Lauren Spencer-Smith	"Fingers Crossed" ◁	1	14 January	1	
The Weeknd	"Sacrifice" ◁	5	14 January	-	
Carolina Gaitán, Mauro Castillo, Adassa, Rhenzy Feliz, Diane Guerrero, Stephanie Beatriz & cast of Encanto	"We Don't Talk About Bruno" ◁	1	4 February	2	
Tate McRae	"She's All I Wanna Be" ◁	6	11 February	-	
Lost Frequencies featuring Calum Scott	"Where Are You Now"	1	18 February	1	
Sam Fender	"Seventeen Going Under"	4	18 February	-	
Ed Sheeran	"The Joker and the Queen" ◁	5	18 February	-	
Tiësto and Ava Max	"The Motto"	6	18 February	-	
Belters Only featuring Jazzy	"Make Me Feel Good"	1	25 February	2	
Jessica Darrow	"Surface Pressure"	7	25 February	-	
Mimi Webb	"House on Fire" ◁	5	25 February	-	
Justin Bieber	"Ghost"	7	4 March	-	
Fireboy DML and Ed Sheeran	"Peru"	7	11 March	-	
Dave	"Starlight" ◁	1	11 March	4	
Aitch featuring Ashanti	"Baby" ◁	5	25 March	-	
Jax Jones featuring MNEK	"Where Did You Go?"	5	1 April	-	
Harry Styles	"As It Was" ◁	1	8 April	10	
Jack Harlow	"First Class" ◁	2	15 April	-	
Camila Cabello featuring Ed Sheeran	"Bam Bam"	4	29 April	-	
Ed Sheeran	"2step" ◁	9	29 April	-	
Benson Boone	"In the Stars" ◁	10	6 May	-	
Dermot Kennedy	"Something to Someone" ◁	2	13 May	-	
Lizzo	"About Damn Time"	2	20 May	-	
Kendrick Lamar	"N95" ◁	4	20 May	-	
Kendrick Lamar, Blxst and Amanda Reifer	"Die Hard" ◁	6	20 May	-	
Kendrick Lamar	"United in Grief" ◁	7	20 May	-	
Harry Styles	"Late Night Talking" ◁	2	27 May	-	
Harry Styles	"Matilda" ◁	3	27 May	-	
Calvin Harris, Dua Lipa and Young Thug	"Potion" ◁	9	3 June	-	
Tion Wayne and La Roux	"IFTK"	10	10 June	-	
Cat Burns	"Go"	9	17 June	-	
Kate Bush	"Running Up That Hill"	1	17 June	7	
Harry Styles	"Music for a Sushi Restaurant" ◁	8	24 June	-	
Joji	"Glimpse of Us"	2	24 June	-	
Drake featuring 21 Savage	"Jimmy Cooks" ◁	9	24 June	-	
Drake	"Falling Back" ◁	10	24 June	-	
Drake	"Massive" ◁	5	1 July	-	
LF System	"Afraid to Feel"	2	15 July	-	
George Ezra	"Green Green Grass"	4	15 July	-	
Nathan Dawe featuring Ella Henderson	"21 Reasons"	8	15 July	-	
David Guetta, Becky Hill and Ella Henderson	"Crazy What Love Can Do"	5	22 July	-	
Rosa Linn	"Snap"	6	29 July	-	
Central Cee	"Doja" ◁	5	29 July	-	
Beyoncé	"Break My Soul"	1	5 August	2	
OneRepublic	"I Ain't Worried"	5	12 August	-	
Steve Lacy	"Bad Habit"	9	19 August	-	
Eliza Rose and Interplanetary Criminal	"B.O.T.A. (Baddest of Them All)"	1	19 August	6	
Elton John and Britney Spears	"Hold Me Closer" ◁	2	2 September	-	
David Guetta featuring Bebe Rexha	"I'm Good (Blue)" ◁	2	9 September	-	
Dermot Kennedy	"Kiss Me" ◁	4	9 September	-	
Nicki Minaj	"Super Freaky Girl"	6	16 September	-	
Lewis Capaldi	"Forget Me" ◁	2	16 September	-	
James Hype and Miggy Dela Rosa	"Ferrari"	8	16 September	-	
Sam Smith and Kim Petras	"Unholy" ◁	1	30 September	4	
Cian Ducrot	"All for You"	2	7 October	-	
Beyoncé	"Cuff It"	6	14 October	-	
Oliver Tree and Robin Schulz	"Miss You"	2	21 October	-	
Taylor Swift	"Anti-Hero" ◁	1	28 October	6	
Taylor Swift	"Lavender Haze" ◁	2	28 October	-	
Taylor Swift featuring Lana Del Rey	"Snow on the Beach" ◁	3	28 October	-	
Rihanna	"Lift Me Up" ◁	3	4 November	-	
Taylor Swift	"You're on Your Own, Kid" ◁	6	4 November	-	
Drake and 21 Savage	"Rich Flex" ◁	3	11 November	-	
Drake and 21 Savage	"Major Distribution" ◁	5	11 November	-	
Drake and 21 Savage	"Circo Loco" ◁	7	11 November	-	
Tom Odell	"Another Love"	6	25 November	-	
Meghan Trainor	"Made You Look"	3	25 November	-	
Anne-Marie and Aitch	"Psycho"	8	25 November	-	
Venbee and Goddard.	"Messy in Heaven"	9	25 November	-	
Dermot Kennedy	"One Life" ◁	10	25 November	-	
Raye featuring 070 Shake	"Escapism"	1	9 December	5	
Lewis Capaldi	"Pointless" ◁	7	9 December	-	
Mariah Carey	"All I Want for Christmas Is You"	2	16 December	-	
Wham!	"Last Christmas"	1	30 December	2	
Andy Williams	"It's the Most Wonderful Time of the Year"	9	30 December	-	

== Entries by artist ==
The following table shows artists who achieved two or more top 10 entries in 2022. The figures include both main artists and featured artists and the peak position in brackets.

Entries	Artist	Songs
6	Drake	"Massive" (5), "Jimmy Cooks" (9), "Falling Back" (10), "Rich Flex" (3), Major Distribution" (5), "Circo Loco" (7)
4	Ed Sheeran	"Peru" (7), "The Joker and the Queen" (5), "Bam Bam" (4), "2step" (9)
4	Harry Styles	"As It Was" (1), "Late Night Talking" (2), "Matilda" (3), "Music for a Sushi Restaurant" (8)
4	21 Savage	"Jimmy Cooks" (9), "Rich Flex" (3), Major Distribution" (5), "Circo Loco" (7)
4	Taylor Swift	"Anti-Hero" (1), "Lavender Haze" (2), Snow on the Beach" (3), "You're on Your Own, Kid" (6)
3	Dermot Kennedy	"Something to Someone" (2), "Kiss Me" (4), "One Life" (10)
3	Kendrick Lamar	"N95" (4), "Die Hard" (6), "United in Grief" (7)
2	David Guetta	"Crazy What Love Can Do" (5), "I'm Good (Blue)" (2)
2	Beyoncé	"Break My Soul" (1), "Cuff It" (6)
2	Lewis Capaldi	"Forget Me" (2), "Pointless" (7)
2	Ella Henderson	"Crazy What Love Can Do" (5), "21 Reasons" (8)
2	Aitch	"Baby" (5), "Psycho" (8)

== See also ==
- 2022 in music
- List of number-one singles of 2022 (Ireland)
