= Dan Grech-Marguerat =

English record producer and sound engineer

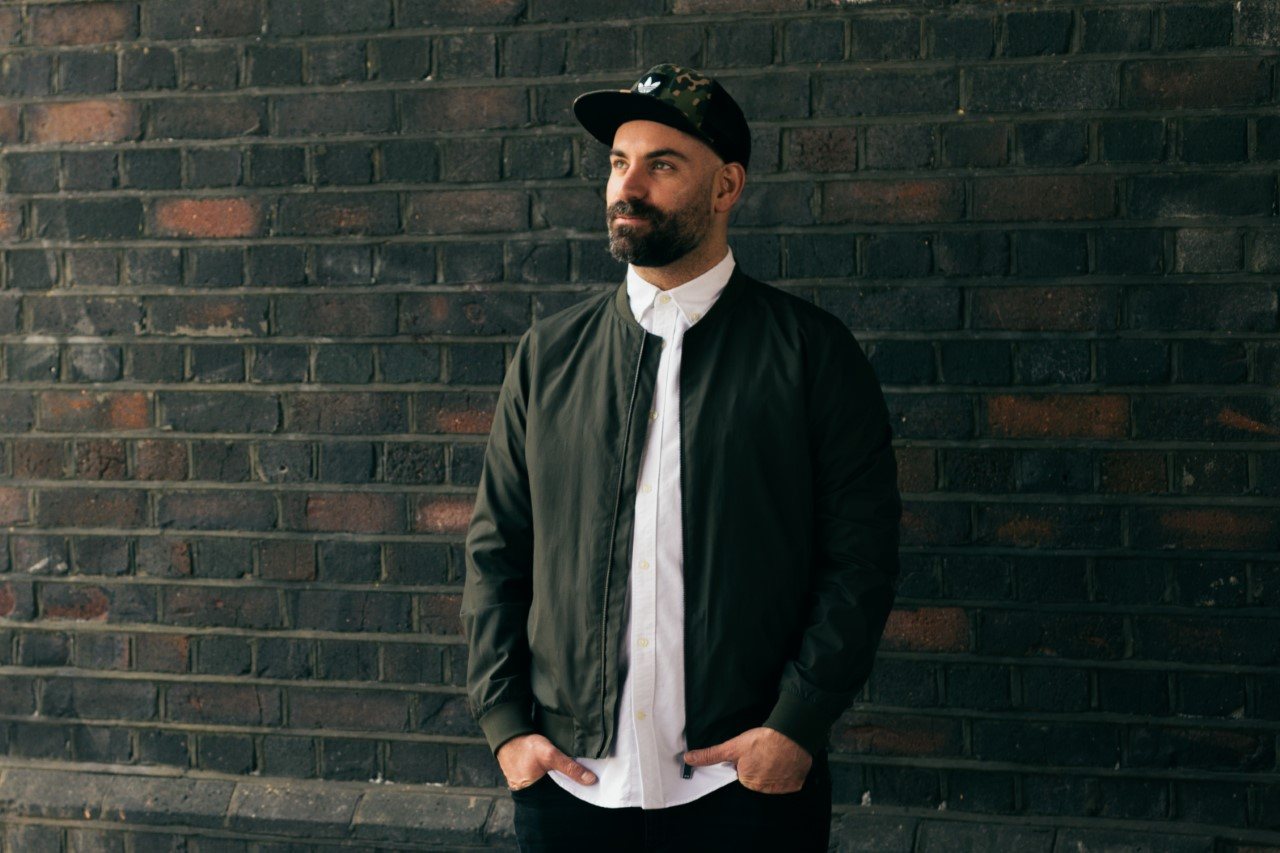
- Born: 11 July 1981 (age 44); Bedford, England
- Other name: Dan Grech
- Occupations: Recording engineer; Music producer; Musician; Mixing engineer
- Years active: 2001-present
- Known for: Audio mixing
- Awards: Grammy Award for Best Alternative Music Album-51st Annual Grammy Awards; Mixer of the Year Music Producers Guild Awards 2021
- Website: dan-grech.com

Daniel James Grech-Marguerat (born 11 July 1981), is an English-Maltese record producer, mixer, and engineer. He is based in East London.

Grech has worked with artists including The Killers, Halsey, Lana Del Rey, Liam Gallagher, Kelsea Ballerini, Tom Odell, Mumford & Sons, Keane, and Moby. He won a Grammy Award for Best Alternative Music Album for his work on Radiohead's In Rainbows.

== Career ==
Grech started working at RAK Studios in St John's Wood, London as an assistant recording engineer. He worked with record producer Nigel Godrich for two years, participating on records by Charlotte Gainsbourg, The Divine Comedy, Beck and Radiohead.

In 2006, he mixed the Scissor Sisters second album Ta-Dah, including the single I Don't Feel Like Dancin', co-written by Elton John, which went to number one in 8 countries, top 10 in 20 countries, and was certified 2x platinum in the UK. Grech initially joined the project to assist with recording live instruments but eventually took on a larger role, including mixing. Later that year, Grech mixed the debut record for the band Dragonette, starting a long-term relationship with the band.

In 2007, Grech produced two tracks for the Radio 1 Established 1967 anniversary album, one for The Kooks and one for The Kaiser Chiefs. He went on to produce several tracks for The Kooks second album Konk, and also mixed the Moby album 'Last Night.

In 2009, Grech won the Grammy Award for Best Alternative Music Album for engineering Radiohead's In Rainbows. He also received a Grammy nomination for Album of the Year for his work on the album.

In 2010, Grech produced the debut album for The Vaccines, What Did You Expect from The Vaccines?.

Grech mixed the majority of Lana Del Rey's 2012 album Born to Die, which was the fifth best-selling album in the world that year. In 2025, it became the longest charting album by a female artist in Billboard 200 history at 618 weeks. Grech produced and mixed Keane's fourth studio album 'Strangeland', released in 2012.

In 2013, Grech produced Long Way Down, the debut record for Tom Odell and winner of the BRITs Critics Choice Award. Grech also produced Tom Odell’s 2012 debut single “Another Love”, which went viral on TikTok and other social media platforms ten years after its release, and as of February 2026 is the 23rd most streamed song in the world on Spotify, with over 3.4 billion streams.

In 2013, Grech also produced The Brink, the second album for the Australian band The Jezabels. In 2014, Grech worked with Liverpool-based guitar band Circa Waves. He produced and mixed their debut album which entered the UK charts at number 10 in April 2015. Singles from the album included Fossils and T-Shirt Weather. In 2015, he produced and mixed the Birdy and Rhodes duet Let It All Go. At the start of 2016, Grech worked with Mumford & Sons. He recorded the Johannesburg EP in South Africa with the band.

Grech's releases in 2017 included Liam Gallagher's debut solo album As You Were, he produced 8 of the 12 tracks including the single For What It's Worth. On working with Grech, Gallagher said, “I’ll play him a tune very badly and he’ll go, ‘Yeah, I get where you’re coming from’ and get the acoustics down and away we go.” That year, he also mixed The Killers' single "The Man", which reached number one on the Billboard Adult Alternative Airplay chart, and went platinum in the US in 2024. In 2018, Grech mixed Staying at Tamara's, George Ezra's second album, including the single "Paradise". In the same year, he also mixed releases for Rae Morris, Mikky Ekko, and Tom Grennan.

Grech has worked frequently with country pop singer Kelsea Ballerini. He mixed her 2020 album Kelsea, which includes duets with Halsey, Shania Twain, and Kenny Chesney. He received a 2022 CMA Award nomination for Single of the Year for that album's single "Half of My Hometown". He mixed the 2021 single "I Quit Drinking" by Ballerini and LANY, which was certified platinum in the US in 2026. Grech mixed Ballerini's 2023 album Rolling Up the Welcome Mat, earning a CMA Award nomination for Album of the Year for his work on the album, which was also nominated for a Grammy Award for Best Country Album. Grech mixed five songs on Ballerini's 2024 album Patterns, which was nominated for a Grammy Award for Best Contemporary Country Album.

Grech has additional production and live credits on 2021's Rag'n'Bone Man and Pink single Anywhere Away From Here. He contributed additional production and mixing for the radio single and worked with the NHS choir on the live performance at the Brit Awards. In 2021, Grech produced Tom Grennan's album Evering Road, and mixed the 2021 Muna and Phoebe Bridgers single "Silk Chiffon". Also that year, he began working with Sam Ryder, mixing Ryder's debut EP Sun’s Gonna Rise. Grech mixed and produced the UK Eurovision entry song for 2022, Ryder's There's Nothing but Space, Man!.

Grech won Mix Engineer of the Year at the 2021 Music Producers Guild Awards, and was nominated for the award in 2022, 2023, and 2024.

Grech mixed several tracks on Tom Grennan's 2025 album Everywhere I Went, Led Me to Where I Didn't Want to Be, including the singles "Boys Don't Cry" and "Full Attention". The album reached number one on the Scottish Albums Chart and UK Albums Chart.

== Awards and nominations ==
Year	Award	Work	Category	Result
2009	Grammy Awards	Best Alternative Music Album	In Rainbows by Radiohead	Won
2009	Grammy Awards	Album of the Year	In Rainbows by Radiohead	Nominated
2021	MPG Awards	Mix Engineer of the Year	Self	Won
2022	MPG Awards	Mix Engineer of the Year	Self	Nominated
2022	CMA Awards	Single of the Year	"Half of My Hometown" by Kelsea Ballerini and Kenny Chesney	Nominated
2023	MPG Awards	Mix Engineer of the Year	Self	Nominated
2023	CMA Awards	Album of the Year	Rolling Up the Welcome Mat by Kelsea Ballerini	Nominated
2024	MPG Awards	Mix Engineer of the Year	Self	Nominated

== Discography ==
Year	Title	Artist	Credits
2001	Amnesiac	Radiohead	Engineer
2005	The Roads Don't Love You	Gemma Hayes	Mixing
2006	Ta-Dah	Scissor Sisters	Additional Producer, Mixing
2006	Control	GoodBooks	Producer, Mixing
2007	In Rainbows	Radiohead	Engineer
2007	Track for 40 years of Radio 1	Kaiser Chiefs	Producer, Mixing
2007	Galore	Dragonette	Mixing
2008	Last Night	Moby	Mixing
2009	Fixin to Thrill	Dragonette	Co-Producer, Mixing
2009	Radio Wars	Howling Bells	Producer
2009	Sam Sparro	Sam Sparro	Mixing
2009	Slow Attack	Brett Anderson	Mixing
2009	Konk	The Kooks	Producer, Mixing
2010	Voyage	The Sound of Arrows	Additional Producer, Mixing
2010	Penguin Prison	Penguin Prison	Additional Producer, Mixing
2011	What You Wanted	Spector	Producer, Mixing
2011	Remixes	Hurts	Mixing
2011	What Did You Expect from the Vaccines?	The Vaccines	Producer
2011	Bad Dream Hotline	Foe	Mixing
2012	Born to Die	Lana Del Rey	Mixing
2012	Never Live Another Yesterday	The Penelopes	Mixing
2012	Strangeland	Keane	Producer, Mixing
2012	Songs from Another Love EP	Tom Odell	Producer
2012	Long Way Down	Tom Odell	Producer
2013	Exile	Hurts	Producer
2013	Track "Bros"	Wolf Alice	Mixed
2013	Rituals	Fenech-Soler	Mixed
2014	The Brink	The Jezabels	Producer
2014	"Real Love"	Tom Odell	Co Produced and Mixed
2015	Young Chasers	Circa Waves	Producer
2015	Badlands	Halsey	Mixing
2015	Josef Salvat	Josef Salvat	Mixing
2015	"Let It All Go"	Birdy & Rhodes	Additional Production, Mixing
2015	White Light	Shura	Mixing
2016	Johannesburg	Mumford and Sons	Additional Production, Mixing
2016	FMA	Grace	Additional Production, Mixing
2016	Kindly Now	Keaton Henson	Production & Mixing
2016	White Tiger	Izzy Bizu	Producer
2016	Remember Us to Life	Regina Spektor	Mixing
2017	As You Were	Liam Gallagher	Produced
2017	About U	MUNA	Additional Production & Mixing
2017	"Waves"	Dean Lewis	Additional Production & Mixing
2017	"The Man"	The Killers	Mixing
2018	Lighting Matches	Tom Grennan	Mixing
2018	Staying at Tamara's	George Ezra	Mixing
2018	"There You Are"	Zayn	Additional Production & Mixing
2018	Only Ticket Home	Gavin James	Mixing
2018	Someone Out There	Rae Morris	Mixing
2018	Fame	Mikky Ekko	Mixing
2019	404	Barns Courtney	Additional Production & Mixing
2019	Dedicated	Carly Rae Jepsen	Mixing
2019	Jade Bird	Jade Bird	Mixing
2019	You	James Arthur	Mixing
2019	"Lazy"	Kylie & The Vaccines	Production & Mixing
2019	Love + Fear	Marina	Mixing
2019	My Name Is Michael Holbrook	Mika	Mixing
2019	Saves the World	MUNA	Mixing
2019	False Alarm	Two Door Cinema Club	Mixing
2020	Possession	Joywave	Mixing
2020	"What You Gonna Do???"	Bastille	Mixing
2020	Rookery	Giant Rooks	Mixing
2020	Kelsea	Kelsea Ballerini	Mixing
2020	"Bittersweet"	Lianne La Havas	Mixing
2020	Nightfall	Little Big Town	Mixing
2020	Walls	Louis Tomlinson	Production & Mixing
2020	Cherry Blossom	The Vamps	Mixing
2020	What A Time To Be Alive	Tom Walker	Mixing
2020	In A Dream	Troye Sivan	Mixing
2021	One Foot in Front of the Other	Griff	Mixing
2021	You Signed Up for This	Maisie Peters	Mixing
2021	"Anywhere Away from Here" - Radio Mix	Rag n Bone Man & Pink	Production & Mixing
2021	Evering Road	Tom Grennan	Production & Mixing
2022	Wonderful Life	Two Door Cinema Club	Producer
2022	MUNA	MUNA	Mixing
2022	"People Pleaser"	Cat Burns	Mixing
2022	Gold Rush Kid	George Ezra	Mixing
2022	Faith In The Future	Louis Tomlinson	Mixing
2022	Hold The Girl	Rina Sawayama	Mixing
2022	There's Nothing but Space, Man!	Sam Ryder	Production & Mixing
2022	Homesick	Sea Girls	Mixing
2022	History	The Knocks	Mixing
2022	Night Call	Years & Years	Mixing
2023	Live More & Love More	Cat Burns	Mixing
2023	That! Feels Good!	Jessie Ware	Mixing
2023	Rolling Up the Welcome Mat	Kelsea Ballerini	Mixing
2023	What Ifs & Maybes	Tom Grennan	Mixing
2023	Portraits	Birdy	Mixing
2023	Quarter Life Crisis	Baby Queen	Mixing, programming
2023	Sorry I'm Late	Mae Muller	Mixing, programming
2023	Therapy	Zoe Wees	Mixing
2023	This Life	Take That	Mixing, engineering, programming
2023	Victory	Cian Ducrot	Mixing, programming
2023	Who We Used to Be	James Blunt	Mixing
2023	Drummer	G Flip	Mixing
2024	Vertigo	Griff	Mixing
2024	&	Bastille	Mixing, programming, vocals
2024	All Quiet on the Eastern Esplanade	The Libertines	Mixing, programming
2024	Good Neighbours	Good Neighbours	Mixing
2024	How Have You Been?	Giant Rooks	Mixing
2024	Patterns	Kelsea Ballerini	Mixing
2024	Supernatural	Barns Courtney	Mixing
2024	The Epilogue	Dean Lewis	Mixing
2024	Early Twenties	Cat Burns	Mixing
2025	00:00	Sophie and the Giants	Mixing, keyboards
2025	Everywhere I Went, Led Me to Where I Didn't Want to Be	Tom Grennan	Mixing, programming
2025	How to Be Human	Cat Burns	Mixing
2026	"Imposter"	Louis Tomlinson	Engineer, programming
