= Early Twenties =

Studio album by Cat Burns
- Released: 12 July 2024
- Genre: Pop
- Length: 49:53
- Label: Since '93; RCA
- Producer: Jonah; Inverness; Kurisu; Jonny Lattimer; Steve Mac; Britten Newbill; The Nocturns; Stuart Price; Jordan Riley; Risc; Ed Thomas; Yakob

Cat Burns chronology
Emotionally Unavailable (2022)	Early Twenties (2024)	How to Be Human (2025)

Early Twenties is the debut studio album by British singer-songwriter Cat Burns, released on 12 July 2024 through Since '93 and RCA Records. The album was preceded by the singles "Alone", "End Game" and "Met Someone". The deluxe edition includes the previously released singles "Go" and "Wasted Youth" with Goddard. It also includes a collaboration with India.Arie. Early Twenties has received positive reviews from critics, and was nominated for the 2024 Mercury Prize.

== Critical reception ==
Professional ratings
Aggregate scores
Source	Rating
Metacritic	81/100
Review scores
Source	Rating
Clash	9/10
DIY	3/5 stars
The Line of Best Fit	8/10
The Observer	4/5 stars

Early Twenties received a score of 81 out of 100 on review aggregator Metacritic based on four critics' reviews, which the website categorised as "universal acclaim". Reviewing the album for Clash, Lauren Dehollogne wrote that Burns "proves that she is willing to bare her soul while delivering some of the best pop vocals of the last decade" as she is "often conducting a sound that resembles the gap between early Beyoncé and Paramore" and "able to make even her saddest moments danceable". DIY's Bella Martin stated that "when Early Twenties is as its best is when Cat is at her most inside-thoughts-out-loud, marrying the specificities of her internal struggles with conversely euphoric pop moments".

John Amen of The Line of Best Fit felt that Burns "opt[s] for self-reflection, exploring habitual tendencies that undermine her higher commitments. The project brims with honesty, practical wisdom, and reminders that we're more resilient than we think." He concluded that Early Twenties "documents a young and talented artist striving to make herself a better human and the world a better place". Tara Joshi of The Observer said, "imbued with moving gospel richness and an indie sensibility, it's an introspective but anthemic, English-accented pop collection about growing pains".

== Track listing ==
Early Twenties track listing
No.	Title	Writer(s)	Producer(s)	Length
1.	"Alone"	Cat Burns; Steve Mac	Mac	2:52
2.	"Go"	Burns; George Morgan; Jonah Stevens; Wille Tannergard	Jonah	3:35
3.	"End Game"	Burns; Gez O'Connell; Jordan Riley	Riley	2:26
4.	"Boy Crazy"	Burns; Jonny Lattimer	Jonah; Risc; TommyD^{[a]}	3:06
5.	"This Is What Happens"	Burns; Yakob Rabitsch	Yakob; Risc^{[a]}	2:44
6.	"People Pleaser"	Burns; O'Connell; Riley	Riley; Stuart Price	2:27
7.	"Met Someone"	Burns; Lattimer	Lattimer; Risc	2:49
8.	"Live More & Love More"	Burns; O'Connell; Riley	Burns; Price; Charles Haydon Hicks^{[a]}; Luke Burgoyne^{[a]}	2:38
9.	"Jodie"	Burns; Simon Aldred	Risc; TommyD^{[a]}	3:23
10.	"Low Self Esteem"	Burns; O'Connell; Riley	Riley	3:13
11.	"You Don't Love Me Anymore"	Burns; Britten Newbill; Victoria Zaro	Newbill; Kurisu	3:24
12.	"False Hope"	Burns; Nathaniel Ledwidge; Newbill	Risc	3:08
13.	"No More"	Burns; O'Connell; Riley	Riley; Inverness	2:08
14.	"Happier Without You"	Burns; Newbill; Rabisch	Yakob	3:06
15.	"Some Things Don't Last Forever"	Burns; Mac	Risc	2:42
16.	"Know That You're Not Alone"	Burns; Joe Housley; Charlie Martin; Rob Nelsen; Newbill	Inverness; The Nocturns; Matt Wolach^{[a]}	2:55
17.	"Healing" (featuring India.Arie)	Burns; India Simpson; Ed Thomas	Thomas; Courtland Liddell^{[a]}; Eddie Allen^{[a]}; Edward Lucuara^{[a]}	3:17
Total length:				49:53

Deluxe edition
No.	Title	Writer(s)	Producer(s)	Length
18.	"Wish It Was Me"	Burns; Hannah Berney; Newbill; Francis White	Risc	2:57
19.	"Introvert"	Burns; Lattimer	Lattimer; Risc^{[a]}	2:51
20.	"Ghosting"	Burns; Riley	Riley; Mike Spencer^{[a]}	2:25
21.	"We're Not Kids Anymore"	Burns; Eyelar Mirzazadeh; Sam Posener; Aston Rudi	Rudi	3:03
22.	"Free"	Burns; Jimmy Napes	Rudi	3:36
23.	"Sleep at Night"	Burns; Berney; Christopher Smith	Risc	2:34
24.	"Go" (Goddard. remix)	Burns; Morgan; Stevens; Tannergard	Jonah; Goddard.^{[r]}	3:12
25.	"Wasted Youth" (with Goddard.)	Burns; Piers Aggett; Aldred; Jonny Coffer; Kesi Dryden; Andrew Goddard; Will Kennard; Saul Milton	Goddard.; Coffer^{[c]}; Kennard^{[c]}	2:27
Total length:				72:58

Notes

- ^{^[c]} signifies a co-producer
- ^{^[a]} signifies an additional producer

== Personnel ==
Musicians

- Cat Burns – lead vocals (all tracks), guitar (tracks 1, 5), background vocals (3, 8, 10, 13), electric guitar (17)
- Cherice Voncelle – background vocals (track 1)
- Subrina McCalla – background vocals (track 1)
- Doug Harper – drums (track 1)
- Steve Mac – keyboards (track 1)
- Chris Laws – programming (track 1)
- Jonah Stevens – bass guitar, guitar, keyboards, percussion, piano (tracks 2, 24)
- Jordan Riley – bass guitar, drums, guitar, keyboards, programming (tracks 3, 8, 10, 13); background vocals (3, 10)
- Gez O'Connell – background vocals (tracks 3, 10, 13)
- The Elements – programming (track 3)
- Benjamin Lee – strings (track 3)
- Risc – acoustic guitar (tracks 4, 5, 7, 9, 18, 19), electric guitar (4, 7, 9, 18, 19), programming (5, 7, 9, 12, 15, 18, 19), synthesizer (5, 12, 19), background vocals (7), bass guitar (9, 18), guitar (23)
- Wired Strings – strings (tracks 4, 9)
- Yakob – piano, programming, synthesizer (tracks 5, 14); strings (5); bass guitar, percussion (14)
- AKlass Collective Singers – background vocals (track 6)
- Debbie – background vocals (track 6)
- Jonny Lattimer – bass guitar, guitar, percussion (tracks 7, 19); drum machine, vocals (19)
- Stuart Price – bass guitar, drums, keyboards, programming (track 8)
- Dan Grech-Marguerat – programming (track 8)
- Aod – guitar (tracks 9, 12, 15)
- Britten Newbill – acoustic guitar, background vocals (track 11)
- Hollie Petrie – background vocals (track 11)
- James Thompson – background vocals (track 11)
- Teheliah Daniels – background vocals (track 11)
- Chris Thomas – bass guitar, cello, electric guitar, keyboards (track 11)
- Inverness – programming (tracks 13, 16), guitar (13), keyboards (16)
- Nicholas Veinoglou – guitar (track 14)
- Charlie Martin – bass guitar, drums, guitar, keyboards, programming, synthesizer (track 16)
- Joe Housley – background vocals, guitar (track 16)
- Ed Thomas – bass guitar, drum machine, electric guitar, keyboards, programming (track 17)
- Sam Posener – bass guitar, guitar (track 22)
- Lewis Moody – organ (track 22)
- Dan Diggas – piano (track 22)
- Joel Bailey – vocals (track 22)
- Goddard. – remixing (track 24)

Technical

- Randy Merrill – mastering (tracks 1, 16)
- Dan Gresham – mastering (tracks 2, 24)
- Stuart Hawkes – mastering (tracks 3–5, 7, 9, 10, 12–15, 17–19)
- Mark Bowyer – mastering (tracks 6, 22)
- Andy Miles – mastering (tracks 8, 11, 20, 21, 23)
- Saul Milton – mastering, mixing (track 25)
- Will Kennard – mastering, mixing (track 25)
- Mark "Spike" Stent – mixing (tracks 1, 16)
- Aaron Ahmad – mixing (tracks 2, 24)
- Dan Grech-Marguerat – mixing (tracks 3, 6, 8)
- Manon Grandjean – mixing (tracks 4, 7, 9–15, 17–19, 22, 23)
- Mike Spencer – mixing (track 20)
- Dan Parry – mixing (track 21)
- Chris Laws – engineering (track 1)
- Dann Pursey – engineering (track 1)
- Isabel Gracefield – engineering (tracks 4, 9)
- Jordan Riley – engineering (tracks 8, 13)
- Britten Newbill – engineering (track 11)
- Ed Thomas – engineering (track 17)
- Risc – engineering (track 23)
- Amond Jackson – vocal engineering (track 17)
- Jeff Cain – vocal engineering (track 17)
- Matt Wolach – engineering assistance (track 1)
- Rosie Danvers – performance arrangement (tracks 4, 9)

== Charts ==
Chart performance for Early Twenties
Chart (2024)	Peak position
Scottish Albums (OCC)	7
UK Albums (OCC)	7
