= Brit Awards 2023 =

British music awards ceremony

- Date: 11 February 2023
- Location: The O2 Arena
- Hosted by: Mo Gilligan

Highlights
- Most awards: Harry Styles (4)
- Most nominations: Harry Styles; Wet Leg (4)
- Website: brits.co.uk

Television/radio coverage
- Network: ITV, ITV2 and ITVX (United Kingdom); YouTube (outside United Kingdom)

Brit Awards 2023, the 43rd edition of the ceremony, presented by the British Phonographic Industry (BPI), was held on 11 February 2023 to recognise the best in British and international music. The ceremony took place at The O2 Arena in London and was hosted by British comedian Mo Gilligan, who returns after hosting the 2022 edition. Coverage of the red carpet was broadcast on ITV2 and presented by Clara Amfo, Maya Jama and Roman Kemp. The 2023 Brit Award trophy was designed by Nigerian-born London-based artist Olaolu Slawn.

Going into the ceremony, Harry Styles and Wet Leg were the most-nominated artists, with four each. Styles emerged as the night's big winner, winning in all four of the categories he was nominated in, with Wet Leg and Beyoncé also winning multiple awards.

The ceremony was screened on ITV to 3.3 million viewers.

== Performances ==
=== Brits Week 2023 ===
In order to promote the awards ceremony and support the charity War Child, the BPI hosted a number of gigs around the country as part of Brits Week Artists performing as part of Brits Week included:

- The Hunna at Lafayette, London (31 January)
- Metronomy at HERE at Outernet, London (1 February)
- The 1975 at Gorilla, Manchester (1 February)
- Years & Years at HERE at Outernet, London (2 February)
- Kojey Radical at XOYO, London (3 February)
- Beabadoobee at Lafayette, London (3 February)
- Cavetown at Omeara, London (4 February)
- The Snuts at Stereo, Glasgow (5 February)
- Sea Girls at 100 Club, London (7 February)
- Easy Life at Trinity Centre, Bristol (7 February)
- Sugababes at The Garage, London (8 February)
- Frank Turner and The Sleeping Souls at O2 Shepherd's Bush Empire, London (9 February)
- Bob Vylan at Omeara, London (10 February)
- Rina Sawayama at Lafayette, London (10 February)

=== Main ceremony ===
On 12 January, Wet Leg, Sam Smith & Kim Petras were confirmed as the first set of performers. On 17 January, Harry Styles joined the line-up, with Cat Burns being confirmed on 20 January. Lizzo, David Guetta, Becky Hill & Ella Henderson all joined the line-up on 23 January.

Performer(s)	Song	UK Singles Chart reaction (week ending 17 February 2023)	UK Albums Chart reaction (week ending 17 February 2023)
Harry Styles	"As It Was"	7 (+27)	Harry's House - 2 (+4); Fine Line - 20 (+11); Harry Styles - 76 (re)
Wet Leg	"Chaise Longue"	82 (re)	Wet Leg - 29 (re)
Lewis Capaldi House Gospel Choir	"Forget Me"	37 (+7)	Divinely Uninspired to a Hellish Extent - 13 (-2)
Lizzo	"Special" "2 Be Loved (Am I Ready)" "About Damn Time"	66 (new entry); 93 (re); 97 (re)	Special - 77 (re)
Stormzy	"Hide & Seek" "I Got My Smile Back"	29 (+/-); N/A	—N/a
Cat Burns	"Go"	64 (+24)	—N/a
Sam Smith Kim Petras	"Unholy"	20 (+1)	Gloria - 19 (-6); In The Lonely Hour - 58 (-2)
David Guetta Becky Hill Ella Henderson Sam Ryder	"Remember" "Crazy What Love Can Do" "I'm Good (Blue)"	N/A; N/A; 26 (+/-)	N/A; Only Honest on the Weekend - 51 (+7); Everything I Didn't Say - 53 (-9); N/A

== Winners and nominees ==
=== Nominees ===
The eligibility period for the 2023 Brit Awards ran from 10 December 2021 to 9 December 2022. Nominees for the Rising Star Award were announced on 29 November 2022, and the winner was announced on 8 December 2022. The nominees for the other categories were announced on 12 January 2023 via the BRITs social platforms by Vick Hope alongside Jack Saunders and Tom Daley. British singer Sam Ryder, became the first Eurovision artist to be nominated for Best New Artist and K-pop girl group Blackpink, became the first Kpop girl group to be nominated for International Group.

=== Voting methods ===
There were a variety of voting methods to determine the winners of the awards:

- Genre categories (Pop/R&B Act, Dance, Alternative/Rock Act and Hip Hop/Rap/Grime): Public vote exclusively via TikTok
- Rising Star: Shortlist selected by an invited panel from the music press, radio/music TV along with other music professionals
- Honorary awards (Producer of the Year and Songwriter of the Year): The BRITs Committee
- All other awards: The BRITs Voting Academy

The public voting held on TikTok took place from 19 January to 2 February with voters allowed to vote up to ten times a day per nominee per category. The BRITs Voting Academy is made up of around 1,200 music industry experts selected by the BRITs Committee.

Winners are listed first and highlighted in bold.

British Album of the Year (presented by Stanley Tucci)	British Artist of the Year (presented by Lucien Laviscount & Camille Razat)
**Harry Styles – Harry's House**; The 1975 – Being Funny in a Foreign Language; Wet Leg – Wet Leg; Stormzy – This Is What I Mean; Fred Again – Actual Life 3 (January 1 – September 9 2022)	**Harry Styles**; Central Cee; Fred Again; George Ezra; Stormzy
British Group (presented by Chloe Kelly & Leigh-Anne Pinnock)	Song of the Year (presented by Shania Twain)
**Wet Leg**; The 1975; Arctic Monkeys; Bad Boy Chiller Crew; Nova Twins	**Harry Styles – "As It Was"**; Aitch & Ashanti – "Baby"; Cat Burns – "Go"; Dave – "Starlight"; Ed Sheeran & Elton John – "Merry Christmas"; Eliza Rose & Interplanetary Criminal – "B.O.T.A. (Baddest of Them All)"; George Ezra – "Green Green Grass"; Lewis Capaldi – "Forget Me"; LF System – "Afraid to Feel"; Sam Smith & Kim Petras – "Unholy"
Best Pop/R&B Act (presented by Salma Hayek Pinault)	Best Dance Act (presented by Alex Scott & Emily Atack)
**Harry Styles**; Cat Burns; Charli XCX; Dua Lipa; Sam Smith	**Becky Hill**; Bonobo; Calvin Harris; Eliza Rose; Fred Again
Best New Artist (presented by Ellie Goulding & Tom Grennan)	Best Rock/Alternative Act (presented by Selin Hizli & Daisy May Cooper)
**Wet Leg**; Kojey Radical; Mimi Webb; Rina Sawayama; Sam Ryder	**The 1975**; Arctic Monkeys; Nova Twins; Tom Grennan; Wet Leg
Best Hip Hop/Grime/Rap Act (presented by Declan Rice & Jodie Turner-Smith)	International Artist of the Year (presented by Rhys Connah and Georgia May Jagger)
**Aitch**; Central Cee; Dave; Loyle Carner; Stormzy	**Beyoncé**; Burna Boy; Kendrick Lamar; Lizzo; Taylor Swift
International Group of the Year (presented by Clara Amfo, Roman Kemp and Maya Jama)	Best International Song (presented by Naomi Ackie)
**Fontaines D.C.**; Blackpink; Drake & 21 Savage; First Aid Kit; Gabriels	**Beyoncé – "Break My Soul"**; David Guetta & Bebe Rexha – "I'm Good (Blue)"; Fireboy DML & Ed Sheeran – "Peru"; Carolina Gaitán, Mauro Castillo, Adassa, Rhenzy Feliz, Diane Guerrero & Stephanie Beatriz – "We Don't Talk About Bruno"; Gayle – "ABCDEFU"; Jack Harlow – "First Class"; Lizzo – "About Damn Time"; Lost Frequencies & Calum Scott – "Where Are You Now"; OneRepublic – "I Ain't Worried"; Taylor Swift – "Anti-Hero"
Producer of the Year (presented by Fatboy Slim)	Songwriter of the Year
**David Guetta**	**Kid Harpoon**
Rising Star
**Flo**; Cat Burns; Nia Archives

=== Artists with multiple wins and nominations ===
The following artists received multiple awards and nominations:

Nominations	Series
4	Harry Styles
4	Wet Leg
3	Cat Burns
3	Fred Again
3	Stormzy
3	The 1975
2	Aitch
2	Arctic Monkeys
2	Beyoncé
2	Central Cee
2	Dave
2	Ed Sheeran
2	Eliza Rose
2	Lizzo
2	Nova Twins
2	Sam Smith
2	Taylor Swift
Awards	Series
4	Harry Styles
2	Beyoncé
2	Wet Leg

== Controversies ==
Upon the announcement of the 2023 nominees, the Brits garnered significant controversy when the Artist of the Year featured exclusively male nominees.

Eligibility to be the Best British Artist of the Year is to have released at least one top 40 album or two top 20 singles, released between 10 December 2021 and 9 December 2022. An artist's record company decides whether to propose an eligible artist to be considered by The Brits for nomination. Of the seventy eligible artists, twelve were female. Female artists were significantly represented in other categories, with Wet Leg receiving the joint highest number of nominations for the ceremony along with Harry Styles. A spokesperson for the Brits stated that 2022 saw fewer high profile women artists major releases and would monitor future nomination patterns. When Styles won the category, he dedicated the award to several of the female artists who had not been nominated.

Additional controversy surrounded the Brit Award for Pop/R&B Act category, with critics citing a lack of R&B representation and questioning why the two genres were grouped together in the first place.

Several issues arose throughout the ceremony. During the acceptance speech for British Group, one member of the group Wet Leg shouted an expletive anti-Conservative Party message, which was subsequently censored.

Another incident involved comedian Daisy May Cooper, who seemingly made an inappropriate cocaine joke about the Sugababes. Despite Daisy’s microphone crackling, as she uttered the insensitive joke, it was not bleeped out of the show for people watching at home.

Additionally, production issues concerning the construction of the set for Sam Smith's performance resulted in a pre-recording of Adele performing her song "I Drink Wine" from last year's ceremony, being shown.

Sam Smith and Kim Petras' performance of "Unholy" received backlash's resulting in over 100 Ofcom complaints being made.
