= How to Be Human (disambiguation) =

How to Be Human is a 2025 album by Cat Burns.

How to Be Human may also refer to:

- How to Be Human, 2017 album by The Classic Crime
- How to Be Human, 2023 album by Amber Run
