= Dance All Over Me =

2022 single by George Ezra

- signed CD single cover

Single by George Ezra

from the album Gold Rush Kid
- Released: 30 September 2022
- Genre: Disco, dance-pop, soul
- Length: 3:14
- Label: Columbia; Sony
- Songwriters: George Ezra; Joel Pott
- Producer: Joel Pott

George Ezra singles chronology
"Green Green Grass" (2022)	"Dance All Over Me" (2022)	"Sweetest Human Being Alive" (2023)

Music video
- "Dance All Over Me" on YouTube

"Dance All Over Me" is a song by British singer-songwriter George Ezra. It was released on 30 September 2022, as the third single from Ezra's third studio album Gold Rush Kid. The song peaked at number 61 on the UK Singles Chart.

== Music video ==
The music video premiered on 30 September 2022. It was directed by Charlie Sarsfield.

== Track listings ==
Digital download
No.	Title	Length
1.	"Dance All Over Me" (Acoustic)	3:34

Digital download
No.	Title	Length
1.	"Dance All Over Me" (Jax Jones remix)	2:45

Digital download
No.	Title	Length
1.	"Dance All Over Me" (Oden & Fatzo remix)	3:36

CD single (19658775772)
No.	Title	Length
1.	"Dance All Over Me"
2.	"Dance All Over Me" (instrumental)
3.	"Dance All Over Me" (acoustic)

== Charts ==
=== Weekly charts ===
Weekly chart performance for "Dance All Over Me"
Chart (2022–2023)	Peak position
Belgium (Ultratop 50 Flanders)	7
Belgium (Ultratop 50 Wallonia)	49
Czech Republic Airplay (ČNS IFPI)	2
Finland Airplay (Radiosoittolista)	72
Poland (Polish Airplay Top 100)	4
Slovakia Airplay (ČNS IFPI)	45
UK Singles (Official Charts)	61

=== Year-end charts ===
Year-end chart performance for "Dance All Over Me"
Chart (2023)	Position
Belgium (Ultratop 50 Flanders)	39
Poland (Polish Airplay Top 100)	42

== Certifications ==
Region	Certification	Certified units/sales
United Kingdom (BPI)	Silver	200,000^{‡}
^{‡} Sales+streaming figures based on certification alone.

== Release history ==
Release history and formats for "Dance All Over Me"
Region	Date	Format	Label	Version	Ref.
Various	30 September 2022	Contemporary hit radio	Columbia; Sony	Original	
Various	7 October 2022	Digital download; streaming	Columbia; Sony	acoustic	
Various	14 October 2022	Digital download; streaming	Columbia; Sony	Jax Jones	
Various	28 October 2022	Digital download; streaming	Columbia; Sony	Oden & Fatzo remix	
United Kingdom	2 December 2022	CD single	Columbia; Sony	Original; instrumental; acoustic	
