= Messy in Heaven =

2022 single by Venbee and Goddard

Single by Venbee featuring Goddard

from the album Zero Experience
- Released: 23 September 2022
- Genre: Drum and bass; jungle drum 'n' bass; alt-pop
- Length: 2:50
- Label: Sony
- Songwriters: Andrew Goddard; Dan Fable; Erin Doyle; Matteo Cinti
- Producers: Goddard; Teo; Jacob Manson

Venbee singles chronology
"Low Down" (2022)	"Messy in Heaven" (2022)	"Gutter" (2023)

Goddard singles chronology
"Green Light" (2022)	"Messy in Heaven" (2022)	"Feel Like That" (2022)

Music video
- "Messy in Heaven" on YouTube

"Messy in Heaven" is a song by British singer Venbee featuring East Midlands producer Goddard. Released as her second single on 23 September 2022 through Sony, the song was written after Venbee had a dream of Jesus partying on Chatham High Street, and used him as a metaphor for her friend's struggles with drugs. It achieved commercial success in Ireland, New Zealand and the United Kingdom, peaking at nine, seven and three, respectively, and positive reception critically, with The Guardian describing it as "a key tune" in drum and bass' 2020s renaissance, and many critics made note of its opening lyric, "I heard Jesus did cocaine on a night out", which was played once on BBC Radio 1 and drew complaints from Christians.

== Background ==
In March 2022, Chatham vocalist Venbee uploaded a snippet of her then-unfinished song "Low Down" featuring Dan Fable, a Manchester-based vocalist who had made a number of appearances on BBC Music Introducing in 2012 and 2013 (Note: "The Girl That Never Smiles" in 2012, and "Beautiful Liar" and "The Girl I Used To Know" in 2013.) and who had set up a photography company in 2017. A dark pop song about depression, the song went viral on TikTok, prompting the pair to rush to finish the track; when self-released the following month, the song peaked at number 59 on the UK Singles Chart. She then toured with Piri & Tommy and joined Loud LDN.

She then booked a subsequent session with Fable and Matteo Cinti in a small studio in Tottenham. The night before, she had a dream about partying with Jesus on Chatham High Street; on the day, after telling Fable and Cinti about it, she came up with the idea of using Jesus as a metaphor for a friend of hers, who had developed a cocaine addiction after trying to please everyone other than herself and falling into a downward spiral, and the song took twenty minutes to write.

== Composition ==
The song’s lyrics were written by Venbee and Dan Fable, and its music and production by Matteo Cinti. Explaining himself to Music Week, Fable noted that they created the song to a guitar part that Cinti had written, that they wrote the song "I heard Jesus did cocaine on a night out" first before coming up with the rest of the hook, that Venbee would suggest lines which they would then lyricise such as "his eyes are dilated" becoming "eyes wide open, dilated, but he’s fine now", and that they had compiled a list of religious phrases and stories and a list of ways in which Jesus could be described, with "leader" turning into "leader, never backs out of the arrangement".

The song had originally been written with a traditional layout until Columbia Records got involved; feeling that the song would benefit from external involvement, they sent it to Goddard., a Northamptonshire producer who made short drum and bass tracks, and who was taken aback the first time he heard the opening lyric. According to Fable, he converted the song into a track that could be played "at a rave or in a club" after sending it backwards and forwards several times, during which they rearranged some sections and scrapped one of them to give it "more of a bite". The finished product begins with a light guitar riff before developing into a drum and bass beat.

== Release ==
On 23 September 2022, she released "Messy in Heaven" on Columbia Records, a sublabel of Sony Music. On 30 September 2022, an edited version of the song was released, with the opening lyric amended to "I heard my mate lost his mind on a night out"; in a November interview with George FM, Goddard. stated that BBC Radio 1 had played the original once and had received complaints from Christians. A further version was released in November 2022 featuring ArrDee, which further explored the party and made reference to living large and "Seshlehem", a portmanteau of sesh and Bethlehem; in an interview with Clash, Venbee noted that this had been booked without her knowledge, and that she only found out once he was in studio recording it after her A&R texted her to that effect. Additionally, Dublin production duo Belters Only released a remix. Upon release, the song went viral; in an interview with MistaJam, Venbee noted that she was using a very old phone at the time, and the notifications she was getting finished it off.

== Reception ==
The Line of Best Fit described the song's lyrics as "larger-than-life", its opening lyric as "unmissable", and the track as "heavenly", while Music Week described the song as "pulsating" and WDET-FM enjoyed the song, particularly the opening line. The Guardian described Venbee's voice as "delicate", the song's "woi-oi attitude" as "catnip for Gen Z", and the song as "a key tune in D&B’s current renaissance", while Rolling Stone described the song as "the perfect encapsulation of what Venbee is all about; drum ‘n’ bass hits that can fill the dancefloor, sure, but have a real depth to them too" and NME described the song as "thrilling" and "cathartic".

On the UK Singles Chart, the song slowly reached a peak of No. 3 in late November 2022, fell sharply for a few weeks, and abruptly went back to No. 3 from No. 65 in January 2023; in the UK, Christmas songs regularly reenter the charts over Christmas, and during that year's festive period 29 of the UK Top 40 were Christmas songs. Additionally, the song spent fifteen weeks at the top of the UK Dance Chart and charted at No. 15 on the end-of-year chart. The success of the song meant that the release of Venbee's subsequent single, "Gutter", was delayed by several months, despite having been teased on TikTok just before "Messy in Heaven". In December 2022, the song won "Best Bass Track" at the BBC Radio 1 Dance Awards, and in November 2023, Apple Music announced that the song had become the seventh most streamed song of that year on its platform.

== Music video and other media ==
A music video was released for the song, which begins with Venbee welcoming guests into her house, and contains footage of her and guests at a houseparty, at a rave, and in a vehicle. On 28 February 2023, the edited version of the song was used in series 9 of Love Island, and in September 2023, Venbee performed both "Messy in Heaven" and a cover of Justin Bieber's "Sorry" for Triple J's Like a Version. In October 2023, the song appeared on Venbee's mixtape Zero Experience, along with "Low Down", "Rampage", which had also been co-written by Fable and Cinti, and "ME4 (Council Estate)", which was also co-credited to Goddard.

== Track listing ==
Digital single

1. "Messy in Heaven" (Venbee, Goddard.) – 2:50
2. "Low Down" (Venbee, Dan Fable) – 3:02

Edited

1. "Messy in Heaven – Edited" (Venbee, Goddard.) – 2:50

VIP mix

1. "Messy in Heaven – VIP mix" (Venbee, Goddard.) – 3:00
2. "Messy in Heaven" (Venbee, Goddard.) – 2:50

After Party mix

1. "Messy in Heaven – After Party mix" (Venbee, Goddard.) – 2:40
2. "Messy in Heaven" (Venbee, Goddard.) – 2:50

Belters Only & Seamus D remix

1. "Messy in Heaven – Belters Only & Seamus D remix" (Venbee, Goddard., Belters Only, Seamus D) – 2:36
2. "Messy in Heaven" – 2:50

ArrDee version

1. "Messy in Heaven" (Venbee, Goddard., ArrDee) – 3:01
2. "Messy in Heaven" (Venbee, Goddard.) – 2:50

Alcemist remix

1. "Messy in Heaven" (Venbee, Goddard., Alcemist) – 2:52
2. "Messy in Heaven" (Venbee, Goddard.) – 2:50

Restricted remix

1. "Messy in Heaven" (Venbee, Goddard., Restricted) – 2:41
2. "Messy in Heaven" (Venbee, Goddard.) – 2:50

Acoustic version

1. "Messy in Heaven – acoustic version" (Venbee, Goddard.) – 3:02
2. "Messy in Heaven" (Venbee, Goddard.) – 2:50

Extended mix/instrumental

1. "Messy in Heaven – extended mix" (Venbee, Goddard.) – 4:19
2. "Messy in Heaven – instrumental" (Venbee, Goddard.) – 2:50
3. "Messy in Heaven" (Venbee, Goddard.) – 2:50

== Personnel and credits ==
Recording locations

- A small studio in Tottenham

Personnel

- Venbee – vocals
- Goddard. – production
- Jacob Manson – production
- Matteo Cinti/Teo Cinti – production
- Jay Reynolds – mastering, mixing

== Charts ==
=== Weekly charts ===
Weekly chart performance for "Messy in Heaven"
Chart (2022–2023)	Peak position
Australia (ARIA)	76
Ireland (IRMA)	9
New Zealand (Recorded Music NZ)	7
UK Singles (OCC)	3
UK Dance (OCC)	1
US Hot Dance/Electronic Songs (Billboard)	34
US Alternative Airplay (Billboard)	40

=== Year-end charts ===
Year-end chart performance for "Messy in Heaven"
Chart (2023)	Position
New Zealand (Recorded Music NZ)	35
UK Singles (OCC)	15

== Certifications ==
Certifications for "Messy in Heaven"
Region	Certification	Certified units/sales
Australia (ARIA)	Platinum	70,000^{‡}
New Zealand (RMNZ)	Platinum	30,000^{‡}
United Kingdom (BPI)	2× Platinum	1,200,000^{‡}
^{‡} Sales+streaming figures based on certification alone.

== Release history ==
Release history for "Soft Spot"
Region	Date	Format	Version	Artist	Label	Ref.
Various	23 September 2022	Digital download; streaming	Original version	Venbee, Goddard.	Columbia	
Various	30 September 2022	Digital download; streaming	Edited version	Venbee, Goddard.	Columbia	
Various	7 October 2022	Digital download; streaming	VIP mix	Venbee, Goddard.	Columbia	
Various	21 October 2022	Digital download; streaming	After Party mix	Venbee, Goddard.	Columbia	
Various	4 November 2022	Digital download; streaming	Belters Only & Seamus D remix	Venbee, Goddard., Belters Only, Seamus D	Columbia	
Various	11 November 2022	Digital download; streaming	ArrDee version	Venbee, Goddard., ArrDee	Columbia	
Various	25 November 2022	Digital download; streaming	Alcemist remix	Venbee, Goddard., Alcemist	Columbia	
Various	27 January 2023	Digital download; streaming	Restricted remix	Venbee, Goddard., Restricted	Columbia	
Various	27 January 2023	Digital download; streaming	Acoustic version	Venbee, Goddard.	Columbia	
Various	10 February 2023	Digital download; streaming	Extended version/instrumental	Venbee, Goddard.	Columbia	
