= How to Be Human =

How To Be Human

Studio album by Cat Burns
- Released: 31 October 2025
- Genres: Pop; indie pop
- Length: 48:22
- Language: English
- Labels: Since '93; RCA
- Producers: William James Watson; Jordan Riley; Rob Milton; Ed Thomas; bren.; Kurisu; Will Hargreaves; Jonah Summerfield

Cat Burns chronology
Early Twenties (2024)	How To Be Human (2025)

Singles from How to Be Human
- 1. "GIRLS!" Released: January 29th 2025; 2. "All This Love" Released: August 15th 2025; 3. "Lavender" Released: September 12th 2025; 4. "There's Just Something About Her" Released: September 26th 2025; 5. "Please Don't Hate Me" Released: October 17th 2025

How To Be Human is the second studio album by British singer-songwriter Cat Burns, released on 31 October 2025 through Since '93 and RCA Records. The album was preceded by the singles "Please Don't Hate Me", "All This Love", ''There's Just Something About Her'', ''Lavender'' and "GIRLS!", and received generally positive reviews from critics. Several of the tracks on the album relate to grief and loss after Burns' "first heartbreak" and the death of her father and grandfather.

== Critical reception ==
Professional ratings
Aggregate scores
Source	Rating
Album of the Year	65/100
Review scores
Source	Rating
Stereoboard	4/5 stars
Beats Per Minute	78/100
DIY	3.5/5 stars
MusicOMH	3.5/5 stars
The Arts Desk	2/5 stars

The album was generally well-received by critics. Mary Chiney, writing for Beats Per Minute, praised the album's "honesty", saying Burns "tells her truth, and trusts that's enough." Rolling Stone UK wrote that the album was "rich with humanity" and a "perfect portrait of processing grief". Otis Robinson, writing for DIY, rated the album 3½ stars and said that while the album "colours grief in no new strokes, its profundity and earnestness is no less admirable".

Joe Muggs, writing for The Arts Desk, said the album was "heavily over-engineered" and that "it feels like there's something that's far more her waiting to get out."

== Track listing ==
How To Be Human track listing
No.	Title	Writer(s)	Producer(s)	Length
1.	"Come Home"	Cat Burns; Gez O'Connell; Jordan Riley	William James Watson; Riley	3:01
2.	"Can Time Move Faster"	Burns; O'Connell; Riley	Rob Milton; Riley	3:09
3.	"I Hope It's Me"	Burns; Britten Newbill; Ed Thomas	Watson; Thomas	3:50
4.	"Small Talk"	Burns; Violet Skies; Gabriëlle Stok		3:26
5.	"Sad Forever"	Burns; Elof Loelv; Phil Plested	Milton	3:07
6.	"All This Love"	Burns; O'Connell; Riley	Milton; Riley; Jonah Summerfield^{[a]}	3:26
7.	"I Love You, But"	Burns; Skies; Stok	Watson	3:06
8.	"Today"	Burns; Skies; Stok	Watson	2:33
9.	"Gemini"	Burns; Steph Jones; O'Connell; Riley	Milton; Riley	2:35
10.	"GIRLS!"	Burns; Chris Thomas; Newbill	bren.; Kurisu; Brendan Grieve^{[a]}	2:22
11.	"There's Just Something About Her"	Burns; O'Connell; Riley	Milton; Riley	3:12
12.	"Lavender"	Burns; O'Connell; Riley	Milton; Riley; Summerfield^{[a]}	3:06
13.	"Please Don't Hate Me"	Burns; Will Hargreaves; Watson	Watson; Hargreaves	3:34
14.	"I Wish You Well"	Burns; Skies; Stok	Milton	2:30
15.	"When I'm With You"	Burns; Hargreaves; Watson	Watson	2:45
16.	"How To Be Human"	Burns; Skies; Stok	Milton; Summerfield	2:40
Total length:				48:22

- ^{^[a]} signifies an additional producer

== Charts ==
Chart performance for How To Be Human
Chart (2024)	Peak position
UK Albums (Official Charts)	5
Scottish Albums (Official Charts)	9
