= Falling Back (song) =

2022 single by Drake

Song by Drake

from the album Honestly, Nevermind
- Released: June 17, 2022
- Genre: House
- Length: 4:25
- Label: OVO; Republic
- Songwriters: Aubrey Graham; André Boadu; Gregor Sütterlin; Alexander Lustig; Christian Astrop
- Producers: &ME; Rampa

Music video
- "Falling Back" on YouTube

"Falling Back" is a song by Canadian rapper and singer Drake. It was released through Republic Records and OVO Sound as the second track from his seventh studio album, Honestly, Nevermind, on June 17, 2022, along with the album. Drake wrote the song with producers &ME and Rampa and additional producers Alex Lustig and Beau Nox. The song was mixed by 40 and Luca Pretolesi and was recorded by Noel Cadastre.

== Composition and lyrics ==
"Falling Back" was described as "introspective house" by Consequence. The production adds old-school tape hiss.

== Critical reception ==
"Falling Back" was panned by music critics. Writing for Evening Standard, David Smyth felt that "the vocal melody and delivery sound like so many other mid-paced Drake songs, and the lyrics sound dashed off". NME music critic Kyann-Sian Williams described Drake's vocals as "monotonous and droning" and noted that his high-pitched vocals towards the end of the song starts off well but quickly gets worse as he repeatedly sings: "Falling back on me".

== Accolades ==
Awards and nominations for "Falling Back"
Organization	Year	Category	Result	Ref.
MTV Video Music Awards	2023	Best Direction	Nominated	

== Music video ==
The official music video for "Falling Back", directed by Director X, premiered alongside the release of the song and album on June 17, 2022. It sees Drake marrying 23 different women. Canadian-American professional basketball player Tristan Thompson makes an appearance as his best man and Drake's mother, Sandi Graham, also makes an appearance. The video also features The Dan Band singing a cover version of Drake's popular song Best I Ever Had.

In the video, "Free YSL" is written in green capital letters to show support for American record label YSL Records, as some of their artists, including Drake's previous collaborators, American rappers Young Thug and Gunna, and some other artists and affiliates of the collective were arrested and held in jail without bond at the time of the release of the song and video after being named in a Racketeer Influenced and Corrupt Organizations Act (RICO) indictment in May 2022. The marriage scene pays homage to the video for hip hop duo UGK's 2007 single, "International Players Anthem (I Choose You)", featuring fellow hip hop duo Outkast.

== Charts ==
=== Weekly charts ===
Weekly chart performance for "Falling Back"
Chart (2022)	Peak position
Austria (Ö3 Austria Top 40)	51
Canada Hot 100 (Billboard)	4
Denmark (Tracklisten)	28
France (SNEP)	70
Global 200 (Billboard)	7
Greece International (IFPI)	6
Iceland (Tónlistinn)	7
Ireland (IRMA)	10
Italy (FIMI)	68
Lithuania (AGATA)	26
Luxembourg (Billboard)	10
Netherlands (Single Top 100)	43
New Zealand (Recorded Music NZ)	14
Norway (VG-lista)	36
Portugal (AFP)	11
South Africa Streaming (TOSAC)	3
Sweden (Sverigetopplistan)	29
Switzerland (Schweizer Hitparade)	14
UK Singles (OCC)	10
UK Dance (OCC)	3
US Billboard Hot 100	7
US Hot Dance/Electronic Songs (Billboard)	1
US Hot R&B/Hip-Hop Songs (Billboard)	6

=== Year-end charts ===
2022 year-end chart performance for "Falling Back"
Chart (2022)	Position
US Hot Dance/Electronic Songs (Billboard)	15

== See also ==
- List of Billboard number-one dance songs of 2022
