= Go (Cat Burns song) =

Single by Cat Burns

from the EP Emotionally Unavailable and the album Early Twenties
- Released: 31 July 2020
- Length: 3:35
- Label: Since 93; RCA
- Songwriters: Cat Burns; George Morgan; Wille Tannergard; Jonah Stevens
- Producer: Jonah

Cat Burns singles chronology
"Fool in Love" (2020)	"Go" (2020)	"Into You" (2021)

Visualiser
- "Go" on YouTube

"Go" is a song by English singer Cat Burns. It was written on November 14, 2018 then released as a single on 31 July 2020, through Since 93 and RCA Records. Written by Burns, Wille Tannergard, George Morgan and Jonah Stevens, the song rose to popularity in early 2022, eventually peaking at number two on the UK Singles Chart.

The song was included on Burns's 2022 EP Emotionally Unavailable. It was nominated for Song of the Year at the 2023 Brit Awards.

== Background and composition ==
Burns started releasing music in 2016 and posted numerous covers and original songs on social media platforms during the COVID-19 lockdown in 2020. As her content kept gaining traction, her clips soon surpassed over 14 million views. "Go" had previously been uploaded as an acoustic rendition to TikTok, accompanied by American singer H.E.R., before it was officially released in July 2020. According to Burns, the song is about leaving a situation without fighting. About its success, she says, "people love a song that they can sing at the top of their lungs – and 'Go' is that. It's exactly what you want to hear when you're going through a breakup, and need some power and confidence". When performing "Go" in front of a crowd at the Courtyard Theatre, she recalled, "I sang my song 'Go' and I was so surprised that people actually knew the words and were singing it LOUDLY!".

The song was described as "a post-breakup anthem that channels Alright, Still-era Lily Allen with real verve".

A version of the song featuring British singer Sam Smith was released on 6 June 2022.

== Live performances ==
Burns performed the song in her television debut on Later... with Jools Holland on 14 May 2022 and later performed it, along with "People Pleaser" on Jools' Annual Hootenanny on 31 December 2022/1 January 2023. Burns made her American television debut on The Late Late Show with James Corden, performing the song with Sam Smith. She also performed the song on the 2022 Top of the Pops Christmas Eve special. Burns performed the song at the 2023 Brit Awards on 11 February 2023.

== Charts ==
=== Weekly charts ===
Weekly chart performance for "Go"
Chart (2022)	Peak position
Australia (ARIA)	97
Austria (Ö3 Austria Top 40)	60
Denmark (Tracklisten)	40
Germany (GfK)	82
Global 200 (Billboard)	128
Ireland (IRMA)	9
Netherlands (Single Top 100)	67
New Zealand (Recorded Music NZ) Combined with Goddard. remix	3
South Africa Streaming (TOSAC)	32
Sweden (Sverigetopplistan)	53
Switzerland (Schweizer Hitparade)	21
UK Singles (OCC)	2

=== Year-end charts ===
2022 year-end chart performance for "Go"
Chart (2022)	Position
Belgium (Ultratop 50 Flanders)	186
Denmark (Tracklisten)	96
New Zealand (Recorded Music NZ)	5
UK Singles (OCC)	4

2023 year-end chart performance for "Go"
Chart (2023)	Position
UK Singles (OCC)	83

== Certifications ==
Certifications for "Go"
Region	Certification	Certified units/sales
Austria (IFPI Austria)	Platinum	30,000^{‡}
Canada (Music Canada)	Gold	40,000^{‡}
Denmark (IFPI Danmark)	Platinum	90,000^{‡}
New Zealand (RMNZ)	4× Platinum	120,000^{‡}
United Kingdom (BPI)	3× Platinum	1,800,000^{‡}
^{‡} Sales+streaming figures based on certification alone.
