= Venbee =

English singer

- Born: Erin Vemby Anna Doyle; 2000 (age 25–26); Chatham, Kent, England
- Genres: Drum and bass; liquid; jungle; alt pop
- Occupations: Singer; songwriter
- Years active: 2020–present
- Member of: Loud LDN
- Website: www.venbeeofficial.com

Erin Vemby Anna Doyle, known professionally as Venbee, is an English singer and musician. She is best known for the hit single "Messy in Heaven", which was a UK top 3 hit in 2022. Her other chart hits include "Low Down" (with Dan Fable), "Gutter", "Die Young" (with Rudimental) and "No Man's Land" (with Marshmello). She is also a member of Loud LDN.

== Early and personal life ==
Erin Vemby Anna Doyle was born in Chatham, Kent. She has ADHD, which allows her to hyperfocus on writing songs; she also has depression and dyslexia, the latter of which meant she was unable to read properly until she was eighteen, and would keep a Voice Notes diary of how she felt day to day. Before releasing music, she worked in a pub, a call centre and as a personal trainer.

== Career ==
In 2020, Doyle released a number of laptop recordings under a pseudonym. In March 2022, Doyle released a video on to TikTok of a then-unfinished "Low Down" featuring Dan Fable; Doyle wrote the song after rediscovering a retired iPhone 4, and hearing how low she was. At the time she released the video, she had written most of her verse and the chorus, but neither had recorded their verses, meaning that the pair had to rush to record it. When self-released as "Low Down" on 15 April 2022, the song peaked at number 59 on the UK Singles Chart; the song would later be re-released by Sony Music as "low down" on 23 May 2022.

On 23 September 2022, Doyle released "Messy in Heaven", which included "Low Down". She wrote the song at 3am on her guitar, and after a dream in which Jesus walked down her local high street while drunk; and intended the song as an "anti-drug anthem", following a friend being afflicted by drug addiction. The song charted at number 3 on the UK Singles Chart, and spent fifteen weeks at No. 1 on the UK Dance Singles Chart. On 16 March 2023, she released "Gutter", which was written about her own struggles. The song charted at number 95 on the UK Singles Chart. On 20 May 2023, Doyle performed "Gutter" on Later... with Jools Holland. On 20 June 2023, she released "Die Young" with Rudimental, which charted at number 73 on the UK Singles Chart and at number 26 on the UK Dance Chart.

== Artistry ==
Doyle was inspired to take up guitar and piano after seeing her grandfather play. When asked by Clash Magazine in March 2023 what her influences were, she replied that the first album she bought was by Justin Bieber, and that she grew up listening to Carole King, Stevie Nicks, the Carpenters, Rihanna and Adele. She, Piri, Issey Cross, Charlotte Plank, and Willow Kayne are members of Loud LDN, a collective of female and non-binary musicians based in London and its suburbs.

== Discography ==
=== Mixtapes ===
List of mixtapes, with selected details
Title	Details	Certifications
Zero Experience	Released: 20 October 2023; Label: Sony Music UK; Format: Digital download, streaming	RMNZ: Gold

=== Extended plays ===
List of extended plays, with selected details
Title	Details	Certifications
Back to the Drawing Board	Released: 4 September 2026; Label: Self-released; Format: Digital download, streaming	

=== Singles ===
List of singles as a lead artist, with selected chart positions, certifications, and album name
Title	Year	Peak chart positions					Certifications	Album
Title	Year	UK	UK Dance	IRE	NZ	US Dance	Certifications	Album
"Low Down" (with Dan Fable)	2022	59	21	—	35	—	BPI: Silver	Zero Experience
"Messy in Heaven" (with Goddard.)	2022	3	1	9	7	34	BPI: 2× Platinum; ARIA: Platinum; RMNZ: Platinum	Zero Experience
"Gutter"	2023	95	25	—	—	—		Zero Experience
"Die Young" (with Rudimental)	2023	73	26	—	— (Note: "Die Young" did not enter the NZ Top 40 Singles Chart, but peaked at number 15 on the NZ Hot Singles Chart.)	—		Zero Experience
"If Love Could Have Saved You" (with Hybrid Minds)	2023	—	—	—	—	—		Zero Experience
"Rampage" (featuring DJ SS)	2023	—	—	—	— (Note: "Rampage" did not enter the NZ Top 40 Singles Chart, but peaked at number 29 on the NZ Hot Singles Chart.)	—		Zero Experience
"No Man's Land" (with Marshmello)	2024	61	20	—	— (Note: "No Man's Land" did not enter the NZ Top 40 Singles Chart, but peaked at number 17 on the NZ Hot Singles Chart.)	—		Non-album singles
"Palm of My Hands" (Odd Mob remix) (with John Summit)	2024	—	—	—	— (Note: "Palm of My Hands" (Odd Mob remix) did not enter the NZ Top 40 Singles Chart, but peaked at number 28 on the NZ Hot Singles Chart.)	20		Non-album singles
"Dark Place"	2024	—	—	—	—	—		Non-album singles
"This One's Different"	2025	—	—	—	—	—		Non-album singles
"Over You" (with Oppidan)	2025	—	—	—	—	—		Non-album singles
"Rabbit Hole." (with Goddard.)	2025	—	—	—	—	—		Non-album singles
"New Body Parts"	2025	—	—	—	—	—		Non-album singles
"Not My Day"	2026	—	—	—	—	—		Back to the Drawing Board
"Encore, Encore"	2026	—	—	—	—	—		Back to the Drawing Board
"Stars (John's Local)"	2026	—	—	—	—	—		Back to the Drawing Board
"—" denotes a recording that did not chart or was not released in that territory.

=== Other charted songs ===
List of other charted songs, with selected chart positions, and album name
Title	Year	Peak chart positions	Album
Title	Year	NZ Hot	Album
"Seeing Stars" (with Jigitz)	2026	35	50 Ballerinas
