= Green Green Grass (song) =

2022 single by George Ezra

- signed CD single cover

Single by George Ezra

from the album Gold Rush Kid
- Released: 22 April 2022
- Genre: Disco-pop; funk
- Length: 2:47
- Label: Columbia; Sony
- Songwriters: George Ezra; Joel Pott; Stuart Price
- Producers: Joel Pott; Stuart Price

George Ezra singles chronology
| "Anyone for You (Tiger Lily)" (2022) | "Green Green Grass" (2022) | "Dance All Over Me" (2022) |

Music video
- "Green Green Grass" on YouTube

"Green Green Grass" is a song by British singer-songwriter George Ezra. It was released on 22 April 2022, as the second single from Ezra's third studio album Gold Rush Kid. The song reached number three on the UK Singles Chart, becoming Ezra's seventh top ten song there and was nominated for the Brit Award for Song of the Year at the 2023 Brit Awards.

== Background and composition ==
The song was inspired by a 2018 Christmas holiday trip to St. Lucia by Ezra and his friends. About the lyrical background of the song, Ezra explained, "there was a street party going on, with three different sound systems, people cooking in the street. I asked a woman what was going on and she told me it was a funeral – for three people. They were celebrating three lives! I thought: that is not how we do this at home. And it's really beautiful".

The song release coincided with an announcement of his 2022 UK Arena Tour. He performed the song, as well as a cover of Mimi Webb's House on Fire which was released on 18 February, during a BBC Radio 1 Live Lounge performance on 19 May.

"Green Green Grass" is composed in the key of A♭ major with a tempo of 113 beats per minute, with Ezra's vocals ranging from A♭_{5} to E♭_{4}.

Ezra performed the song during the Platinum Jubilee Central Weekend in June 2022. The singer revealed that he was asked to omit the line "on the day that I die" from the performance beforehand.

== Music video ==
The music video was released on 4 May 2022. It was directed by Isaac Ravishankara and shot in Los Angeles.

== Track listings ==
Digital download
| No. | Title | Length |
|---|---|---|
| 1. | "Green Green Grass" | 2:47 |

Digital download
| No. | Title | Length |
|---|---|---|
| 1. | "Green Green Grass" (Sped-up) | 2:08 |

Digital download
| No. | Title | Length |
|---|---|---|
| 1. | "Green Green Grass" (Sam Feldt remix) | 2:18 |

Digital download
| No. | Title | Length |
|---|---|---|
| 1. | "Green Green Grass" (Acoustic) | 3:01 |

Digital download
| No. | Title | Length |
|---|---|---|
| 1. | "Green Green Grass" (Majestic remix) | 3:11 |

CD single (19658727822)
| No. | Title | Length |
|---|---|---|
| 1. | "Green Green Grass" |
| 2. | "Green Green Grass" (instrumental) |
| 3. | "Green Green Grass" (acoustic) |

== Charts ==
=== Weekly charts ===
Weekly chart performance for "Green Green Grass"
| Chart (2022–2023) | Peak position |
|---|---|
| Australia (ARIA) | 19 |
| Austria (Ö3 Austria Top 40) | 17 |
| Belgium (Ultratop 50 Flanders) | 2 |
| Belgium (Ultratop 50 Wallonia) | 28 |
| Croatia (HRT) | 6 |
| Czech Republic Airplay (ČNS IFPI) | 22 |
| Czech Republic Singles Digital (ČNS IFPI) | 93 |
| Germany (GfK) | 55 |
| Global 200 (Billboard) | 134 |
| Hungary (Editors' Choice Top 40) | 11 |
| Hungary (Single Top 40) | 36 |
| Iceland (Tónlistinn) | 22 |
| Ireland (IRMA) | 4 |
| Japan Hot Overseas (Billboard Japan) | 5 |
| Netherlands (Dutch Top 40) | 10 |
| Netherlands (Single Top 100) | 29 |
| New Zealand Hot Singles (RMNZ) | 32 |
| Poland Airplay (ZPAV) | 2 |
| Slovakia Airplay (ČNS IFPI) | 5 |
| Slovakia Singles Digital (ČNS IFPI) | 65 |
| Sweden (Sverigetopplistan) | 44 |
| Switzerland (Schweizer Hitparade) | 58 |
| UK Singles (Official Charts) | 3 |
| US Hot Rock & Alternative Songs (Billboard) | 31 |

=== Year-end charts ===
2022 year-end chart performance for "Green Green Grass"
| Chart (2022) | Position |
|---|---|
| Belgium (Ultratop 50 Flanders) | 17 |
| Belgium (Ultratop 50 Wallonia) | 111 |
| Netherlands (Dutch Top 40) | 31 |
| Netherlands (Single Top 100) | 100 |
| Poland (ZPAV) | 24 |
| UK Singles (OCC) | 15 |

2023 year-end chart performance for "Green Green Grass"
| Chart (2023) | Position |
|---|---|
| Australia (ARIA) | 54 |
| Belgium (Ultratop 50 Flanders) | 87 |
| UK Singles (OCC) | 32 |

== Certifications ==
Certifications for "Green Green Grass"
| Region | Certification | Certified units/sales |
|---|---|---|
| Australia (ARIA) | 2× Platinum | 140,000^{‡} |
| Austria (IFPI Austria) | Platinum | 30,000^{‡} |
| Denmark (IFPI Danmark) | Platinum | 90,000^{‡} |
| Germany (BVMI) | Gold | 300,000^{‡} |
| New Zealand (RMNZ) | Platinum | 30,000^{‡} |
| Poland (ZPAV) | Platinum | 50,000^{‡} |
| Switzerland (IFPI Switzerland) | Gold | 10,000^{‡} |
| United Kingdom (BPI) | 3× Platinum | 1,800,000^{‡} |
^{‡} Sales+streaming figures based on certification alone.

== Release history ==
Release history and formats for "Green Green Grass"
| Region | Date | Format | Label | Version | Ref. |
|---|---|---|---|---|---|
| Various | 22 April 2022 | Digital download; streaming | Columbia; Sony | Original + sped up | |
| Various | 29 April 2022 | Digital download, streaming | Columbia; Sony | Sam Feldt remix | |
| United Kingdom | 13 May 2022 | Digital download, streaming | Columbia; Sony | Acoustic | |
| Italy | 3 June 2022 | Contemporary hit radio | Columbia; Sony | Original | |
| United Kingdom | 10 June 2022 | CD single | Columbia; Sony | original + instrumental + acoustic | |
