= LF System =

Scottish production duo

- Origin: West Lothian, Scotland
- Genres: House
- Years active: 2021–present
- Label: Warner
- Members: Conor Larkman; Sean Finnigan
- Website: lfsystemmusic.com

LF System are a dance music production duo from West Lothian, Scotland, consisting of Conor Larkman and Sean Finnigan. They are best known for their 2022 hit single "Afraid to Feel".

Larkman and Finnigan previously worked as a roofer and petrol station worker. "Afraid to Feel", their third single, topped the UK Singles Chart in July 2022, and was certified triple platinum by the British Phonographic Industry. The track is based on "I Can't Stop (Turning You On)" by 1970s Philadelphia soul band Silk, from their 1979 album Midnight Dancer, with vocals by Louise Clare Marshall both sped-up and slowed down from the original release.

Prior to this number one, they released the track "Dancing Cliché", which was based on a 1981 soul track written by Luther Vandross called "Party People", which was released by the Harlem funk group the Main Ingredient featuring Cuba Gooding.

== Discography ==
=== Singles ===
List of singles, with selected chart positions and certifications
Title	Year	Peak chart positions								Certifications	Album
Title	Year	UK	AUS	BEL (FL)	CRO	DEN	IRE	NL	NZ Hot	Certifications	Album
"Dancing Cliché"	2021	—	—	—	—	—	—	—	—		Non-album singles
"So Do You"	2022	—	—	—	—	—	—	—	—		Non-album singles
"Afraid to Feel"	2022	1	19	20	—	31	2	3	23	BPI: 3× Platinum; IFPI DEN: Gold; NVPI: Gold	Non-album singles
"Hungry (For Love)"	2022	—	—	—	41	—	—	—	—		Non-album singles
"Dancing Shoes (Take Me Higher)"	2023	—	—	—	—	—	—	—	—		Non-album singles
"—" denotes a recording that did not chart or was not released.
