= Goddard. =

English musician (born 1998)

- Born: Andrew Goddard; 1998 (age 27–28); Kettering, England
- Occupation: Producer
- Years active: 2018–present
- Formerly of: Ag.

Andrew Goddard (born 1998), known under the stage name Goddard., is a musician from Kettering, England. He is best known for his remix of Cat Burns's "Go", which charted at No. 2 on the New Zealand Singles Chart, and for featuring on Venbee's "Messy in Heaven", which charted at No. 3 on the UK Singles Chart.

== Life and career ==
=== 1998–2018: Early life and Ag. ===
Andrew Goddard was born in 1998 in Kettering. He was a fan of Hospital Records and Ram Records as a teenager. He studied for a master's degree in Music & Management at Leeds University. He initially went into DJing after admiring the DJs at raves he had attended as a teenager; realising this was not sufficient to make a living, he learned Reason, first by watching YouTube tutorials, then by teaching himself. Whilst at university, he formed Ag. with Ross Quinn, who released "Warped Minds" on 27 July 2018, "All Falls Down" on 21 August 2018, their parent six-track EP Servia on 28 September 2018, and "Silent Corner" on 30 November 2018.

=== 2020–2022: Early solo releases ===
Goddard's early tracks were "very deep liquid tracks"; he told Albawaba.com in May 2021 that two years beforehand he lost someone close to him, and that concentrating on writing helped him grieve. On 12 June 2020, he released "Player" as "Goddard.", and on 28 August 2020 he released the EP Next Gen. On 30 April 2021, he released "Nicotine", which featured Archie, real name Archie Collingwood-Watt, the son of Vanessa Collingridge; on 13 May 2021 a music video was released for the single. On 29 October 2021, he released "Day 9", and on 11 December 2021, he and Dread MC featured on an Allstars MIC, a fortnightly DnB Allstars series. On 9 February 2022, he released "Afterlife" with Bailey, real name Samuel Bailey, and on 23 March 2022 he released "Green Light" with Megan Linnell.

=== 2022–present: Later releases ===
On 25 March 2022, he contributed a remix for Cat Burns's "Go" for her album of remixes; this remix charted at No. 3 on the New Zealand Singles Chart. On 23 September 2022, he and Waypoint remixed the 2020 single "Never Gonna Love" by Love Island contestant and Tonia Buxton's daughter Antigoni, which charted at No. 72 on the UK Singles Downloads Chart, and released "Messy in Heaven" with Loud LDN member Venbee, which charted at No. 3 on the UK Singles Chart, and spent fifteen weeks at No. 1 on the UK Dance Singles Chart. On 30 September 2022, he released a remix of Loud LDN member Charlotte Haining and BCee's "Before You", and on 3 November 2022 Goddard and Haining would release "Feel Like That". In December 2022, he won Best Newcomer at the Drum&BassArena Awards 2022, and he later signed to Atlantic Records. On 21 April 2023, Javeon, Lens, and Pola & Bryson released "Way Up", which had been written in 2022 at a Shogun Audio Writing Camp.

== Artistry ==
Ag. were inspired by Burial, Four Tet, and Maribou State, while Goddard himself was inspired by Maribou State, Bonobo, Etherwood, and Keeno, and has been cited as inspiration by Vibe Chemistry. The Guardian noted in April 2022 that he made "soulful vocal tracks that seem aimed squarely at the dancefloor, but which clock in at pop-single length; hardly anything he does exceeds three minutes", a practice he attributes to learning about listeners' reduced attention spans as a result of the Digital Revolution while at university.

== Charting singles ==
List of solo charting singles, with selected chart positions, showing year released and album name
Title	Year	Peak chart positions	Album
Title	Year	NZ Hot	Album
"Yesterday"	2025	33	Non-album singles
"Eye of the Storm" (with Irah)	2025	29	Non-album singles
