= Afraid to Feel =

2022 single by LF System

Single by LF System
- Released: 2 May 2022
- Genre: House
- Length: 2:57
- Label: Warner Music UK
- Songwriters: Charles B. Simmons; Joseph B. Jefferson; Richard William Roebuck
- Producer: LF System

LF System singles chronology
"So Do You" (2022)	"Afraid to Feel" (2022)	"Hungry (For Love)" (2022)

Audio video
- "Afraid to Feel" on YouTube

"Afraid to Feel" is a song by Scottish duo LF System. The mix was created in 2019 and picked up for full release on 2 May 2022, by Warner Music UK. The single rose to popularity in June 2022 and spent eight consecutive weeks at number one in the UK Singles Chart and six non-consecutive weeks at number two in Ireland. The song prominently samples the Philadelphia International Records act Silk's 1979 song "I Can't Stop (Turning You On)", with Louise Clare Marshall's vocals slowed down and sped up throughout the single.

== Writing and composition ==
The duo found the original track in 2019 while looking for samples to use for loops and vocals. The duo interpolated and re-recorded the original vocal sample from Silk as a replayed use to avoid sample clearance issues. "I Can't Stop (Turning You On)" was a slower 85bpm with "Afraid to Feel" at an uptempo 130bpm, the tempo was altered after playing around with the sample in Ableton Live. The style of production is both similar and pays homage to a disco edit, which started in the 70s to upstart a dance floor, involving cutting one part of a song and chopping it into a different part of the song structure.

== Critical reception ==
Griff of Knights of the Turntable opined that the song was an "irresistible soul-soaked cut" with "heartfelt, slow moments to pumping" next to "pumping, euphoric house grooves". The duo brings a "pure sense of joy throughout" the song.

In May 2022, the song was chosen "Hottest Record" by Clara Amfo on BBC Radio 1.

== Chart performance ==
On the UK Singles Chart, the song reached number 13 when it moved up 56 places from number 69 in its second week on the chart, for the issue dated 10 June 2022. "Afraid to Feel" rose to number one on 8 July.

== Charts ==
=== Weekly charts ===
Weekly chart performance for "Afraid to Feel"
Chart (2022)	Peak position
Australia (ARIA)	19
Belgium (Ultratop 50 Flanders)	20
Denmark (Tracklisten)	31
Finland Airplay (Radiosoittolista)	44
Global 200 (Billboard)	102
Greece International (IFPI)	62
Ireland (IRMA)	2
Lithuania (AGATA)	21
Netherlands (Dutch Top 40)	7
Netherlands (Single Top 100)	3
New Zealand Hot Singles (RMNZ)	23
UK Singles (Official Charts)	1
UK Dance (Official Charts)	1
US Hot Dance/Electronic Songs (Billboard)	34

=== Year-end charts ===
2022 year-end chart performance for "Afraid to Feel"
Chart (2022)	Position
Belgium (Ultratop 50 Flanders)	112
Global Excl. US (Billboard)	192
Netherlands (Dutch Top 40)	55
Netherlands (Single Top 100)	39
UK Singles (OCC)	9
US Hot Dance/Electronic Songs (Billboard)	76

2023 year-end chart performance for "Afraid to Feel"
Chart (2023)	Position
UK Singles (OCC)	41

== Certifications ==
Certifications for "Afraid to Feel"
Region	Certification	Certified units/sales
Denmark (IFPI Danmark)	Platinum	90,000^{‡}
France (SNEP)	Platinum	200,000^{‡}
Italy (FIMI)	Gold	50,000^{‡}
Netherlands (NVPI)	Gold	40,000^{‡}
New Zealand (RMNZ)	Platinum	30,000^{‡}
Poland (ZPAV)	Gold	25,000^{‡}
Spain (Promusicae)	Gold	30,000^{‡}
United Kingdom (BPI)	3× Platinum	1,800,000^{‡}
^{‡} Sales+streaming figures based on certification alone.
