= Cat Burns =

English singer-songwriter (born 2000)

- Born: 6 June 2000 (age 26); Streatham, London, England
- Genre: Indie pop
- Occupation: Singer-songwriter
- Years active: 2016–present
- Labels: Since 93; RCA
- Website: www.catburns.com

Catrina Burns-Temison (born 6 June 2000) is a British singer-songwriter who gained prominence with her 2020 single "Go". The song's popularity increased in 2022 through TikTok, eventually reaching number two on the UK singles chart. It was described by Sony Music as a blend of gospel and pop influences with guitar-led indie music.

Burns has been nominated three times for the Brit Awards. Starting with her debut single "Fallen Out of Love" in 2017, she has continued to release music and attract a following in the music community. She released her debut album, Early Twenties, in July 2024, followed by her second album, How to Be Human, in October 2025.

== Early life ==
Burns was born in Streatham, London, United Kingdom. Her mother is of Jamaican descent and her father is Nigerian. Her parents divorced when she was a child, and she grew up with her mother and sister. She attended the BRIT School in Croydon.

Burns' mother is a singer, and Burns grew up listening to gospel music and was deeply influenced by it. She cites Kirk Franklin, Donnie McClurkin, Marvin Sapp, and others, as her favourites growing up.

== Career ==
Burns recorded her debut EP Adolescent at the age of sixteen while studying at BRIT School. She collaborated with a fellow student who had access to a recording studio in their garden shed. The songs they created formed the basis of the EP, which Burns self-released on 1 October 2016. Despite her efforts to secure a record deal afterward, she faced challenges as the music industry seemed uncertain about how to handle her unique style as an artist.

Subsequently, Burns released her second EP Naïve on 15 May 2019.

In 2020, during the COVID-19 lockdown in the United Kingdom, Burns garnered widespread attention by sharing covers and original songs on TikTok. Her song "Go" went viral, leading to a record deal with Since 93, a subsidiary of RCA Records. Originally released in 2020, "Go" later reached number two on the UK singles chart, second to Harry Styles' "As It Was". In 2022, she supported Years & Years frontman Olly Alexander on the UK leg of his Night Call Tour and also accompanied Ed Sheeran on selected dates of his Mathematics Tour. Burns performed "Go" and "People Pleaser" on Jools' Annual Hootenanny 2022, following her earlier debut on Later... with Jools Holland in May.

On 9 March 2023, Burns released "Home for My Heart", a single featuring rapper ArrDee, with the renowned actor and writer Kwame Kwei-Armah credited as a lyricist on the track. The song reached number 35 on the UK singles chart on 17 March 2023. Burns subsequently released the follow-up single "Live More & Love More" on 31 March 2023.

In May 2025, Burns was announced as a contestant on the first series of BBC's The Celebrity Traitors, joining a cast of 19 celebrities to compete for £100,000 for charity. She was chosen as one of the three original "traitors" on the series. Burns made it to the final alongside fellow traitor Alan Carr but was eliminated after receiving three-votes from faithfuls Joe Marler, Nick Mohammed and David Olusoga.

== Artistry ==
In a 2019 interview with Gal-dem, Burns cited Kirk Franklin, Anne-Marie, Destiny's Child and Marvin Sapp as musical influences. She has also mentioned Kim Burrell, Donnie McClurkin, Tracy Chapman, India Arie, Tori Kelly, Lily Allen, Jimi Hendrix, Michael Jackson and Stevie Wonder as notable influences from her childhood. Discussing her sound, Burns stated "I would say it's just pop with a cooler edge to it because obviously I'm influenced by so many different things. At first, I wanted it to be...because I loved Ed Sheeran so much, I wanted it to be singer-songwriter-y and guitar-y and then as I found my own sound and what I wanted to make it was mainly just pop but I sing in my accent so it has that Britishness to it but I am just talking about relatable things and things that have happened to me or other people".

== Personal life ==
Burns is a lesbian. In an interview with Gay Times, she explained that she initially struggled to reconcile her sexuality with her ethnicity, stating "If you're a Black woman, I want you to feel heard and seen. We are vulnerable people who are capable of having lots of emotions. And, being a Black queer woman adds a layer to that." Burns chronicled her experience with coming out to her family in her song "Free".

Burns has ADHD and noted in an interview that she had often found this helpful in her creative process, explaining "Both the chords and words come at the same time, but the concept comes first and I've found that the system has always worked for me! Helps the process of writing the song become a lot quicker which is great for my ADHD brain!".

In April 2023, Burns was diagnosed as autistic, which she announced on social media.

== Discography ==
=== Studio albums ===
List of studio albums, with release date, and label shown
Title	Album details	Peak chart positions	
Title	Album details	UK	SCO
Early Twenties	Released: 12 July 2024; Label: Since 93/RCA; Formats: Digital download, streaming	7	7
How to Be Human	Released: 31 October 2025; Label: Since 93/RCA; Formats: Digital download, streaming	5	9

=== Extended plays ===
List of extended plays with selected details
Title	Details
Adolescent	Released: 1 October 2016; Label: Self-released; Formats: Digital download, streaming
Naive	Released: 15 May 2019; Label: Since 93/RCA; Formants: Digital download, streaming
Emotionally Unavailable	Released: 20 May 2022; Label: Since 93/RCA; Formats: Digital download, streaming

=== Singles ===
==== As lead artist ====
Title	Year	Peak chart positions								Certifications	Album
Title	Year	UK	AUS	AUT	IRE	NZ	POL Air.	SWI	WW	Certifications	Album
"Fallen Out of Love" (featuring Horus Beats)	2017	—	—	—	—	—	—	—	—		Non-album singles
"Trust Issues"	2017	—	—	—	—	—	—	—	—		Non-album singles
"Sober"	2018	—	—	—	—	—	—	—	—		Naive
"Cheater"	2019	—	—	—	—	—	—	—	—		Naive
"Fuckboy"	2019	—	—	—	—	—	—	—	—		Naive
"I Don't Blame You"	2019	—	—	—	—	—	—	—	—		Non-album singles
"Fool in Love"	2020	—	—	—	—	—	—	—	—		Non-album singles
"Go"	2020	2	97	60	9	3	—	21	198	BPI: 2× Platinum; IFPI AUT: Gold; RMNZ: Platinum	Early Twenties (Note: "Go" and "Ghosting" are also included on the Emotionally Unavailable EP.)
"Into You"	2021	—	—	—	—	—	—	—	—		Non-album singles
"It's Over"	2021	—	—	—	—	—	—	—	—		Non-album singles
"Free"	2021	—	—	—	—	—	—	—	—		Early Twenties (Note: "Go" and "Ghosting" are also included on the Emotionally Unavailable EP.)
"Ghosting"	2022	—	—	—	—	—	—	—	—		Early Twenties
"People Pleaser"	2022	76	—	—	86	—	7	—	—	BPI: Silver	Early Twenties
"Sleep at Night"	2022	—	—	—	—	—	—	—	—		Early Twenties
"Home for My Heart" (with ArrDee)	2023	35	—	—	83	— (Note: "Home for My Heart" did not enter the NZ Top 40 Singles Chart, but peaked at number 23 on the NZ Hot Singles Chart.)	—	—	—		Non-album single
"Live More & Love More"	2023	74	—	—	85	—	—	—	—		Early Twenties
"You Don't Love Me Anymore"	2023	—	—	—	—	—	—	—	—		Early Twenties
"Know That You're Not Alone"	2023	—	—	—	—	—	—	—	—		Early Twenties
"Wasted Youth" (with Goddard.)	2024	58	—	—	—	— (Note: "Wasted Youth" did not enter the NZ Top 40 Singles Chart, but peaked at number 17 on the NZ Hot Singles Chart.)	—	—	—	BPI: Silver; RMNZ: Platinum	Early Twenties
"Alone"	2024	— (Note: "Alone" did not enter the UK Singles Chart but debuted and peaked at number 74 on the UK Singles Downloads Chart Top 100 on 29 March 2024.)	—	—	—	—	—	—	—		Early Twenties
"End Game"	2024	—	—	—	—	— (Note: "End Game" did not enter the NZ Top 40 Singles Chart, but peaked at number 37 on the NZ Hot Singles Chart.)	—	—	—		Early Twenties
"Met Someone"	2024	—	—	—	—	—	—	—	—		Early Twenties
"Even" (with Rachel Chinouriri)	2024	—	—	—	—	—	—	—	—		Non-album singles
"Teenage Dirtbag"	2024	—	—	—	—	—	—	—	—		Non-album singles
"Girls"	2025	—	—	—	—	—	—	—	—		How to Be Human
"All This Love"	2025	—	—	—	—	—	—	—	—		How to Be Human
"Lavender"	2025	—	—	—	—	—	—	—	—		How to Be Human
"There's Just Something About Her"	2025	—	—	—	—	—	—	—	—		How to Be Human
"Please Don't Hate Me"	2025	—	—	—	—	—	—	—	—		How to Be Human
"Is It That Deep?"	2026	—	—	—	—	—	—	—	—		TBA
"—" denotes a recording that did not chart or was not released in that territory.

=== As featured artist ===
List of singles as featured artist
Title	Year	Album
"Perfect" (Sam Smith featuring Cat Burns and Jessie Reyez)	2023	Non-album single

== Tours ==
=== Supporting ===
- Night Call Tour (2022) supporting Years & Years
- +–=÷× Tour (2022) supporting Ed Sheeran
- Gloria the Tour (2023) supporting Sam Smith

== Awards and nominations ==
Award	Year	Nominee(s)	Category	Result	Ref.
BBC Radio 1	2023	Cat Burns	Sound of 2023	Fourth	
Brit Awards	2023	Cat Burns	Rising Star	Nominated	
Brit Awards	2023	Cat Burns	British Pop/R&B Act	Nominated	
Brit Awards	2023	"Go"	Song of the Year	Nominated	
British LGBT Awards	2023	Cat Burns	Music Artist	Nominated	
Gaydio Awards	2023	Cat Burns	Music Artist of the Year	Won	
MTV Europe Music Awards	2022	Cat Burns	Best UK & Ireland Act	Nominated	
Music Week Awards	2023	Cat Burns	Artist Marketing Campaign	Won	
Mercury Prize	2024	Cat Burns	Best Album	Nominated	
