= We Don't Talk About Bruno =

2021 song from animated film Encanto

Single by Carolina Gaitán, Mauro Castillo, Adassa, Rhenzy Feliz, Diane Guerrero, Stephanie Beatriz and cast of Encanto

from the album Encanto (Original Motion Picture Soundtrack)
- Released: November 19, 2021
- Genre: Salsa; Latin pop
- Length: 3:36
- Label: Walt Disney
- Songwriter: Lin-Manuel Miranda
- Producers: Lin-Manuel Miranda; Mike Elizondo

Music video (film sequence)
- We Don't Talk About Bruno on YouTube

"We Don't Talk About Bruno" is a song from Disney's 2021 animated musical film Encanto, with music and lyrics written by Lin-Manuel Miranda. It was released by Walt Disney Records as the only single from the film's soundtrack on November 19, 2021. The song is an ensemble number performed by some of the film's voice cast members: mainly Carolina Gaitán, Mauro Castillo, Adassa, Rhenzy Feliz, Diane Guerrero and Stephanie Beatriz, and a few others in minor roles. A viral sensation, "We Don't Talk About Bruno" has been described as one of the best Disney songs and the studio's biggest crossover success.

Consisting of gossip and anecdotes about Mirabel Madrigal's ostracized uncle, Bruno, whose gift of seeing the future has been associated with misfortune and has left him estranged from the rest of the Madrigal family, "We Don't Talk About Bruno" sees some of the family members and the townsfolk explain to Mirabel why they fear his prophecies. The song suggests that Bruno is villainous, but sheds the narrative styles of conventional Disney villain songs by listing other characters' perspectives of the villain.

Musically, "We Don't Talk About Bruno" is a midtempo tune blending Latin music styles such as salsa and guajira with pop, hip hop, dance and Broadway elements, propelled by cha-cha-chá beats, sung by an ensemble, and climaxing in a polyphonic outro.

"We Don't Talk About Bruno" was met with acclaim from music critics, who praised Miranda's craftsmanship and the song's mystery element, catchy rhythm, versatile composition, ensemble of singers, and lyrical personality. A commercial success, "We Don't Talk About Bruno" spent several weeks at number one in Ireland, the United Kingdom and the United States, and peaked in the top five in Australia, Canada and New Zealand. "We Don't Talk About Bruno" is the longest-reigning chart-topper for Disney in the US Billboard Hot 100 history, as well as the studio's first-ever original song to top the UK Singles Chart. It broke the all-time record for the most credited artists (seven) on a Hot 100 chart-topper.

== Background and release ==
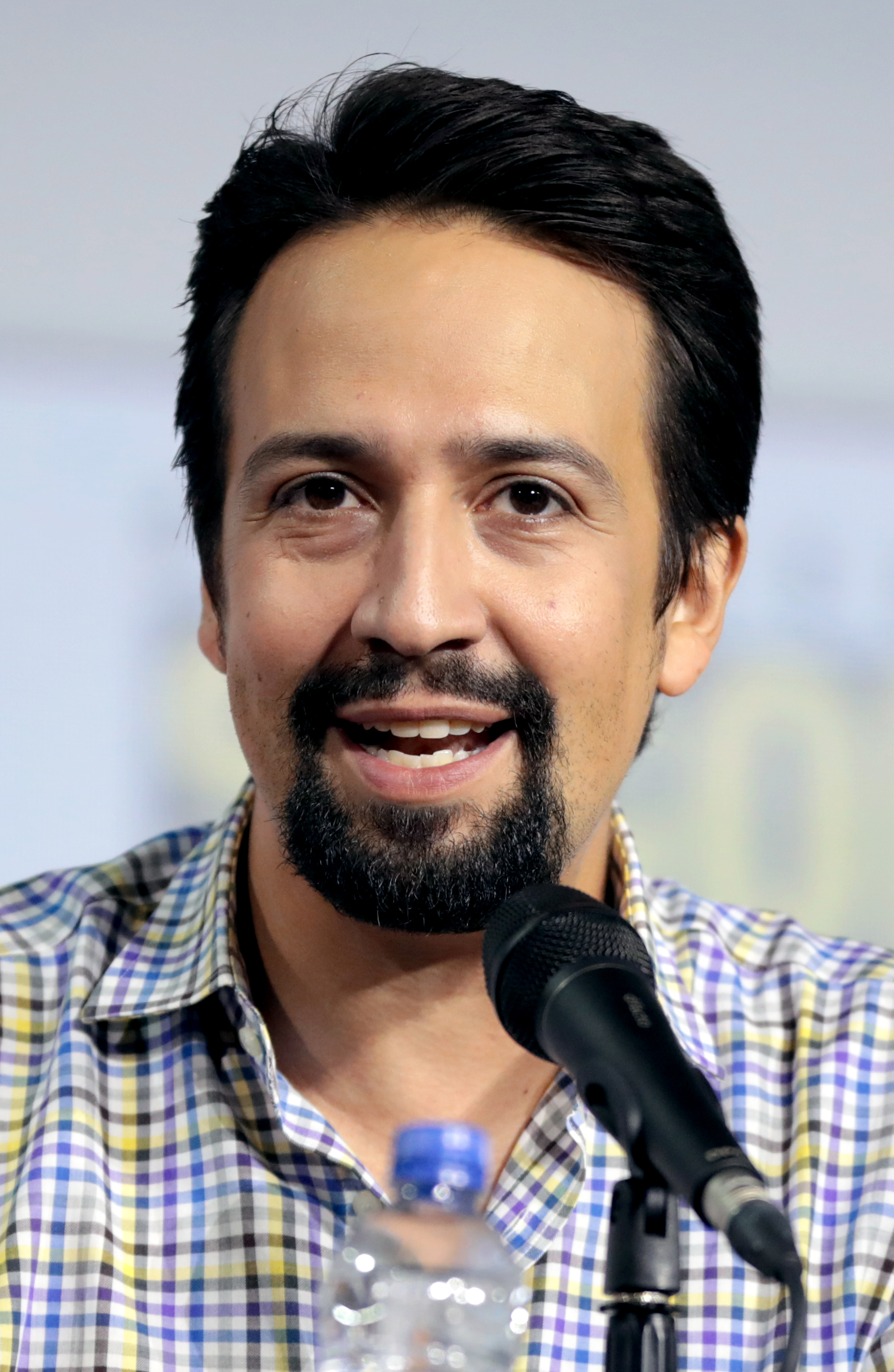
American actor, playwright and musician Lin-Manuel Miranda wrote the original songs of Encanto, including "We Don't Talk About Bruno".

"We Don't Talk About Bruno" is a song from the 2021 American animated musical film, Encanto, by Walt Disney Animation Studios; it is the studio's 60th film. The song is featured as the fourth track on the film's soundtrack, which has been released in 46 languages. It was written and composed by American singer-songwriter Lin-Manuel Miranda, who wrote the seven other songs of the soundtrack, and previously worked on Disney's 2016 animated film, Moana and Sony Pictures' Vivo. The song is mainly performed by six of the film's cast members in full verses: Colombian actress and singer Carolina Gaitán (Pepa), Colombian musician Mauro Castillo (Félix), American singer-songwriter Adassa (Dolores), American actor Rhenzy Feliz (Camilo), American actresses Diane Guerrero (Isabela), and Stephanie Beatriz (Mirabel), in the order of their appearances in the song; Juan Castano (Osvaldo) and Olga Merediz (Alma "Abuela" Madrigal) contribute minor vocals. (Note: Two unidentified actors (who play the characters Señora Pezmuerto and Señor Flores) also contribute minor vocals.)

== Composition ==
Miranda pitched the song as an ensemble because he wanted to create musical themes to represent every family member, especially "those who do not necessarily get their solo". He said he looked to "A Weekend in the Country" from A Little Night Music and "Christmas Bells" from Rent. He described "We Don't Talk About Bruno" as a "gossip" number because there are things family members do not talk about in front of each other. The first verse is about who is telling the story—Mirabel's aunt Pepa and uncle Félix, who Miranda based on his father, Luis Miranda. Miranda said "everyone sings the same chord progression with a totally different rhythm and a totally different cadence". During the film's early development, the song's subject—Bruno—was originally named Oscar. Miranda chose the name Bruno so he could work the lyric "Bruno, no, no, no" into the song. Driven by cha-cha-chá beats, "We Don't Talk About Bruno" has been described as a Latin pop and salsa song. It is heavily rooted in guajira and draws from Cuban folk, hip hop, and dance music. Each section of the song features a different musical style unique to each of the characters. The hooks and the verses by Pepa and Félix are driven by a classic Cuban piano montuno; Dolores's verse consists of ASMR-influenced vocals over soft electronic beats; Camilo's lines exhibit a "spooky" delivery; and later followed by plucked pizzicato strings below Isabela's bright voice.

== Lyrics and context ==
"We Don't Talk About Bruno"
A sample of the song, featuring a verse by Bruno's nephew Camilo Madrigal (Rhenzy Feliz), joined by Pepa (Carolina Gaitán), Félix (Mauro Castillo) and Dolores (Adassa) in the following chorus. Camilo describes Bruno as a fearsome, seven-foot figure.

The song describes the Encanto character Bruno Madrigal from the perspectives of his family members and the local townsfolk. Bruno is one of a set of triplets born to Alma and Pedro Madrigal, alongside his sisters Julieta and Pepa. Like the rest of his family, he has a magical ability; his is the ability to see the future. Encanto's first song, "The Family Madrigal", establishes that Bruno has not been seen for years, and that he is not to be discussed. Bruno's niece Mirabel, the only member of the family without a magical gift, believes one of Bruno's prophecies might reveal the cause of cracks that have been appearing in the structure of their house, and in "We Don't Talk About Bruno" she seeks information about her missing uncle.

The song illustrates how Bruno often foresaw negative events and then was blamed by those affected by them. Bruno's sister Pepa and her husband Félix tell Mirabel how Bruno's warning of rain ruined their wedding day. Pepa and Félix's daughter Dolores explains that Bruno's prophecies frightened and confused the family, and her brother Camilo portrays Bruno as a fearsome figure who "feasts on your screams". Three of the townsfolk relate various misfortunes that Bruno foretold for them. While Mirabel's sister Isabela claims Bruno predicted that her life would be perfect, Dolores laments a prediction that the man she loved would be "betrothed to another". As the family prepares for an engagement dinner party for Isabela and her boyfriend Mariano, Mirabel reassembles the shattered pieces of the last prophecy Bruno made before he disappeared, discovering as the song ends that it shows Mirabel herself at the center of the cracks in the house.

== Critical reception ==
"We Don't Talk About Bruno" received widespread acclaim from music and film critics. Its genre-blending composition and mysterious topic were often praised in its reviews.

Romper's Jamie Kenney called "We Don't Talk About Bruno" the stand-out from Encanto, "one that, above all others, has delightfully ear-wormed into our brains and lived there rent-free since we watched the movie with our kids over holiday break". /Film's Caroline Cao ranked the song as the best on the Encanto soundtrack, calling it humorous and nuanced, further stating: "'We Don't Talk About Bruno' bursts with the Madrigals' vibrant personalities, from Adassa's speedy whispering as cousin Dolores to the way Rhenzy Feliz relishes telling a story as the over-imaginative cousin Camilo". Cao deemed it a "perfect ensemble piece that illuminates each character, sheds light on the story's overarching themes, and offers an unparalleled amount of insight into the world of Encanto". Screen Rant's Kristen Brown also called it the film's best song.

Ashley Spencer of The New York Times wrote, unlike most of Disney's breakout hits, "We Don't Talk About Bruno" is not a "wistful hero's solo or a third-act power ballad", but rather "a Broadway-style ensemble track that revels in gossip about a middle-age man". Slate critic Chris White attributed the song's Latin music rhythm, Broadway influence, "catchy and tight" melodies, distinct verses, dramatic climax, and mysterious lyrics to its viral success. Tyler Posen of Far Out called it an "incessantly catchy" Latin-pop song with a "stylistically diverse" composition and "exposition-heavy" lyrics that has not prevented it from "achieving the kind of crossover success that 'Let It Go' or 'Beauty and the Beast' couldn't". Chris Molanphy of Slate argued that "We Don't Talk About Bruno" is a great song not only because it is catchy, but because it boasts versatility in sound and lyrics throughout its length, accentuated by the "sense of mystery" behind its titular character that is "enveloping, even if you haven't seen the movie", and its refreshing melodies and composition departing from the formulaic production of Disney songs.

== Analysis ==
Mic's Ian Kumamoto called Bruno's situation a "poignant" reminder of how mental illness is treated in families of color, analyzing his rejection from his own family as "not just unfair, but sinister", as Kumamoto interprets the character as having a borderline mental illness or neurodivergence. Kumamoto said that is where the importance of "We Don't Talk About Bruno" comes in: "When you listen to the song closely, the members of the family aren't actually complaining about anything that Bruno has done wrong — they simply don't know what to do with him". Bonnie Jean Feldkamp of Sharon Herald also said it could be argued that Bruno suffers from mental illness, as he exhibits "tics of 'knock-knock-knock on wood' among others".

The song sees various members of Bruno's family sharing their memories of his prophecies and his strange traits. Romper's Jamie Kenney summarized Bruno's fate as a prophet: "it's great when they tell you something you want to hear, but when it's bad news? Well, it's easier to demonize the bearer of that news than accept it". Caroline Cao of /Film shared that sentiment: "The real villain is the family's insecurities, their shame, and their inability to talk out their troubles. In denying these truths, the Madrigals shut out a loved one who was only trying to help".

When the song is performed in the film, a figure resembling Bruno is visible scurrying around in the background. George Chrysostomou of Screen Rant interpreted this as a reflection of where Bruno has been: "While it may seem like a cinematic to add to the musical number, it's actually foreshadowing that Bruno never really left, but instead went into hiding inside his home". Bill Bradley of the same website later argued that since Bruno's eyes were glowing, which only happens when he is making a prophecy, this was likely Camilo (who can shapeshift). The character Dolores, who has the gift of super hearing, reveals at the end of the film that she could hear Bruno in the house the entire time, which she mentions in "We Don't Talk About Bruno" with lines such as "I can hear him now".

== Commercial performance ==
"We Don't Talk About Bruno" was an international success. Within a week after Encanto became available to stream on Disney+, the song reached number one on US Spotify, while the music and lyric videos garnered over 30 million views and 10 million views in its first week, respectively. Up to January 7, 2022, it remained the top trending music video on YouTube since its release on December 28, and became a viral sound on the video-sharing app TikTok. It reached number one on the Billboard Global 200 chart dated February 12, 2022.

=== United States ===
"We Don't Talk About Bruno" topped the Billboard Hot 100, becoming the second number-one song from a Disney animated film, after "A Whole New World" (from Aladdin) by Peabo Bryson and Regina Belle in March 1993. "We Don't Talk About Bruno" was at the number-one spot for five weeks, marking the first-ever song from a Disney film (irrespective of animation or live-action) to top the chart for so many weeks, surpassing "All for Love" (1993) by Bryan Adams, Rod Stewart and Sting, from The Three Musketeers. The single stayed at the top of the chart for five consecutive weeks until it was surpassed by "Heat Waves" by Glass Animals in the issue dated March 12, 2022.

On the Hot 100 chart dated January 8, 2022, the song was the top new entry at number 50 with 12.4 million streams, along with another Encanto song, "Surface Pressure", at number 54. The following week, "We Don't Talk About Bruno" surged to number five, with 25.2 million streams, earning all of its six credited artists their first top 10 entries on the chart. Miranda also garnered his first top 10 writing credit; he previously reached number 20 in October 2017 as both an artist and writer with "Almost Like Praying", a charity single. The next week, it rose to number four, surpassing Frozen's "Let It Go" (2013) to become the highest-charting song from a Disney film since "Colors of the Wind" from the 1995 film Pocahontas.

When the song topped the Hot 100 chart dated February 5, 2022, it dethroned Adele's "Easy on Me" (2021) from the top spot with over 34 million streams and 12,000 digital downloads sold. The song set the record for the most credited recording artists ever (six) on a number-one on the chart. The song also became the first Hot 100 No. 1 entry for Walt Disney Records and the second for Disney Music Group. The moment further marked the first time a soundtrack of a Disney animated movie and one of its songs simultaneously topped the Billboard 200 and Hot 100, respectively. They also marked the first soundtrack and corresponding song to have led the two charts simultaneously for multiple weeks, since the soundtrack of 8 Mile (2002) and its track "Lose Yourself" by Eminem in 2003. Additionally, "We Don't Talk About Bruno" is the first soundtrack song to top the Hot 100 for multiple weeks since Wiz Khalifa's "See You Again" featuring Charlie Puth, from Furious 7: Original Motion Picture Soundtrack, in 2015.

=== Europe ===
The song charted in various European countries. In the United Kingdom, "We Don't Talk About Bruno" topped the UK Singles Chart for seven weeks. It skyrocketed from number 66 to number four in its second week on the chart, and reached number one in its fourth charting week. The song became the first-ever original Disney song to top the chart; otherwise, it is the first Disney song to top the chart since Gareth Gates's cover version of "Suspicious Minds" from Lilo & Stitch: An Original Walt Disney Records Soundtrack in 2002. "We Don't Talk About Bruno" also became the longest-reigning number-one single of 2022 in the UK (as of March 2022). The French version of the song, "Ne parlons pas de Bruno", charted in France at number 166.

== Legacy ==
"We Don't Talk About Bruno" was a viral sensation on the internet, regarded by journalists as a pop culture phenomenon. Critics and audiences have described it as one of the best original songs by Disney. Various reporters and musicologists published articles "trying to explain how a Broadway-style ensemble song from an animated feature, sung by mostly Colombian vocalists with no hitmaking experience, managed to scale the charts". "We Don't Talk About Bruno" is Disney's biggest crossover success in their history. The Times journalist Harriet Walker called "We Don't Talk About Bruno" a "medical-grade" catchy "cultural moment". The Atlantic critic Spencer Kornhaber wrote the song has all of the features that appeals to TikTok: "theatricality, specificity, humor, surprise, and an invitation to roleplay."

Vox's Aja Romano said the song relies heavily on its musical's context, which differentiates it from "typical Disney chart-toppers" such as "Can You Feel the Love Tonight" (1994) and "Colors of the Wind" (1995) that "were intentionally generic in order to serve as marketable hits for their films." Clayton Davis of Variety questioned why the song was not submitted for an Academy Award nomination for Best Original Song, attributing it to Disney not expecting the positive reaction to the song; the Academy's deadline for song submissions was November 1. Instead, "Dos Oruguitas" was submitted for Encanto, (Note: Disney submitted "Dos Oruguitas" before "We Don't Talk About Bruno" achieved its unexpected, widespread success.) which Davis said may have been "the safer bet" for award strategists, due to it resonating emotionally with audiences.

"We Don't Talk About Bruno" topped the Billboard Hot 100 in its fifth week of charting and did so with negligible airplay and did not have a pop radio version like many other Disney songs have had in the past, propelled by its Internet popularity.

On March 16, 2022, Variety reported that "We Don't Talk About Bruno" would be performed live for the first time at the 94th Academy Awards, despite not being nominated. The film's cast performed the song with Becky G, Luis Fonsi, Sheila E., and Megan Thee Stallion. It has been regarded as the "biggest production number of the ceremony"; the show's producer Will Packer stated: "If there is a song that unites people this year (it is this one), and that is kind of the epitome to me of what movies can do, because people of all stripes, ethnicities, ages, color, background, around the world (are singing it) ad nauseum [sic], and we are going to help them out so they sing it a little bit more. Our apologies to the parents."

"We Don't Talk About Bruno" received a nomination for Best International Song at the 2023 Brit Awards, and won Best Song Written for Visual Media at the 65th Annual Grammy Awards.

"Weird Al" Yankovic briefly covered the song for his 2024 polka medley "Polkamania!".

== Music videos ==
The song's segment in the film was uploaded on the DisneyMusicVEVO YouTube channel through Vevo on December 29, 2021, serving as the music video for the song. As of November 2022, it had accumulated just over 530 million views.

In September 2022, Disney Music Group and Deaf West Theatre released a sign-language music video for "We Don't Talk About Bruno" in celebration of the International Day of Sign Languages. The video featured an all-Deaf Colombian and Hispanic cast and incorporated both American Sign Language (ASL) and Colombian Sign Language.

In April 2026, Walt Disney Animation Studios released another signed adaptation of the song as part of Disney Animation's Songs in Sign Language, a Disney+ project created in collaboration with Deaf West Theatre. The sequence was reanimated so that the Encanto characters perform the song in ASL, with Deaf West Theatre performers serving as reference models for the animation. Deaf Colombian performers were cast for the "We Don't Talk About Bruno" sequence, and the production incorporated consultation on Colombian signing; for example, a Colombian sign for "rat" was selected for the scene.

== Charts ==
=== Weekly charts ===
Chart performance for "We Don't Talk About Bruno"
Chart (2021–2022)	Peak position
Australia (ARIA)	5
Austria (Ö3 Austria Top 40)	49
Belgium (Ultratop 50 Flanders)	40
Canada (Canadian Hot 100)	3
Canada CHR/Top 40 (Billboard)	50
Canada Hot AC (Billboard)	49
Germany (GfK)	71
Global 200 (Billboard)	1
Greece International (IFPI)	41
Hungary (Single Top 40)	27
Iceland (Tónlistinn)	3
Ireland (IRMA)	1
Lithuania (AGATA)	76
Netherlands (Single Top 100)	41
New Zealand (Recorded Music NZ)	4
Philippines (Billboard)	6
Portugal (AFP)	71
Singapore (RIAS)	18
South Africa Streaming (TOSAC)	34
Spain (PROMUSICAE)	38
Suriname (Nationale Top 40)	4
Sweden (Sverigetopplistan)	40
Switzerland (Schweizer Hitparade)	70
UK Singles (Official Charts)	1
US Billboard Hot 100	1
US Adult Contemporary (Billboard)	17
US Adult Pop Airplay (Billboard)	20
US Pop Airplay (Billboard)	24
Vietnam (Vietnam Hot 100)	75

Chart performance for "Ne parlons pas de Bruno"
Chart (2022)	Peak position
France (SNEP)	166

Chart performance for "No Se Habla de Bruno"
Chart (2022)	Peak position
Argentina (Argentina Hot 100)	59
Colombia (Billboard)	25
Global Excl. U.S. (Billboard)	121
Peru (UNIMPRO)	89

=== Year-end charts ===
2022 year-end chart performance for "We Don't Talk About Bruno"
Chart (2022)	Position
Australia (ARIA)	38
Belgium (Ultratop 50 Flanders)	197
Canada (Canadian Hot 100)	31
Global 200 (Billboard)	42
New Zealand (Recorded Music NZ)	44
UK Singles (OCC)	11
US Billboard Hot 100	24

== Certifications ==
Certifications for "We Don't Talk About Bruno"
Region	Certification	Certified units/sales
Australia (ARIA)	Platinum	70,000^{‡}
Brazil (Pro-Música Brasil)	Platinum	40,000^{‡}
Canada (Music Canada)	4× Platinum	320,000^{‡}
France (SNEP)	Platinum	200,000^{‡}
Italy (FIMI)	Gold	50,000^{‡}
Mexico (AMPROFON)	Platinum+Gold	210,000^{‡}
New Zealand (RMNZ)	Platinum	30,000^{‡}
Poland (ZPAV)	Gold	25,000^{‡}
Spain (Promusicae)	Platinum	60,000^{‡}
United Kingdom (BPI)	2× Platinum	1,200,000^{‡}
United States (RIAA)	6× Platinum	6,000,000^{‡}
^{‡} Sales+streaming figures based on certification alone.

== See also ==
- List of Billboard Hot 100 number ones of 2022
- List of Billboard Global 200 number ones of 2022
