= Encanto (soundtrack) =

Encanto (Original Motion Picture Soundtrack)
- English-language version cover

Soundtrack album by various artists
- Released: November 19, 2021
- Studios: Newman Scoring Stage, Fox Studio Lot; Eastwood Scoring Stage, Warner Bros. Studios; Criteria Studios; Cyclops Sound, Los Angeles; EastWest Studios; NRG Studios; Phantom Studios, Gallatin, Tennessee; Power Station at Berklee-NYC
- Genres: Latin pop; film score
- Length: 114:41
- Languages: English; Spanish
- Label: Walt Disney
- Producers: Lin-Manuel Miranda; Mike Elizondo; Germaine Franco; Tom MacDougall

Lin-Manuel Miranda chronology
Vivo (2021)	Encanto (2021)	The Little Mermaid (2023)

Singles from Encanto (Original Motion Picture Soundtrack)
- 1. "We Don't Talk About Bruno" Released: November 19, 2021

Encanto (Original Motion Picture Soundtrack) is the soundtrack album to Disney's 2021 film of the same name. Released by Walt Disney Records on November 19, 2021, the album contains eight original songs written by Lin-Manuel Miranda and produced by Mike Elizondo that were recorded by various singers, and 27 score pieces composed by Germaine Franco. It was released in 44 languages in addition to English and Spanish.

To develop the soundtrack, Miranda and team visited Colombia—the setting of Encanto—to study the country's music. Consequently, the album is rooted in genres such as vallenato, cumbia, bambuco and rock en español, making use of the traditional music instruments of Colombia, and incorporates salsa, tango, reggaeton and bachata styles alongside pop, hip hop, folk and musical theatre elements. In the film, the songs are performed by the Madrigals, who are a multigenerational family with magical powers granted to them by a "miracle"; the lyrical themes revolve around individuality, self-worth, transgenerational trauma and familial love.

The soundtrack album was a commercial success, enjoying widespread popularity after Encanto's release on Disney+. It topped the Billboard 200 chart for nine weeks, and charted all of its original songs on the US Billboard Hot 100. Elsewhere, the album reached number one in Australia, Canada, New Zealand, and the United Kingdom, and the top ten in various other territories. "We Don't Talk About Bruno" by various members of the Encanto cast and "Surface Pressure" by Jessica Darrow have been the album's best-selling tracks; the former topped the UK Singles and the US Hot 100 charts for multiple weeks, while the latter peaked at numbers four and eight, respectively. Encanto became the first Disney animated film to generate multiple Hot 100 top-10 entries. Additionally, "We Don't Talk About Bruno" is the second number-one song for Disney in the US after "A Whole New World" from Aladdin (1992), and its first-ever original song to reach number one in the UK.

Upon release, Encanto (Original Motion Picture Soundtrack) was met with critical acclaim and received various accolades. Reviews lauded its vibrant Latin music rhythms and complimented Miranda's musicianship. The album received the Annie Award for outstanding music in a feature film; the Grammy Awards for Best Compilation Soundtrack and Best Score Soundtrack for Visual Media; and the Academy Award nominations for Best Original Score and Best Original Song ("Dos Oruguitas" by Sebastián Yatra), among other accolades.

== Development and release ==
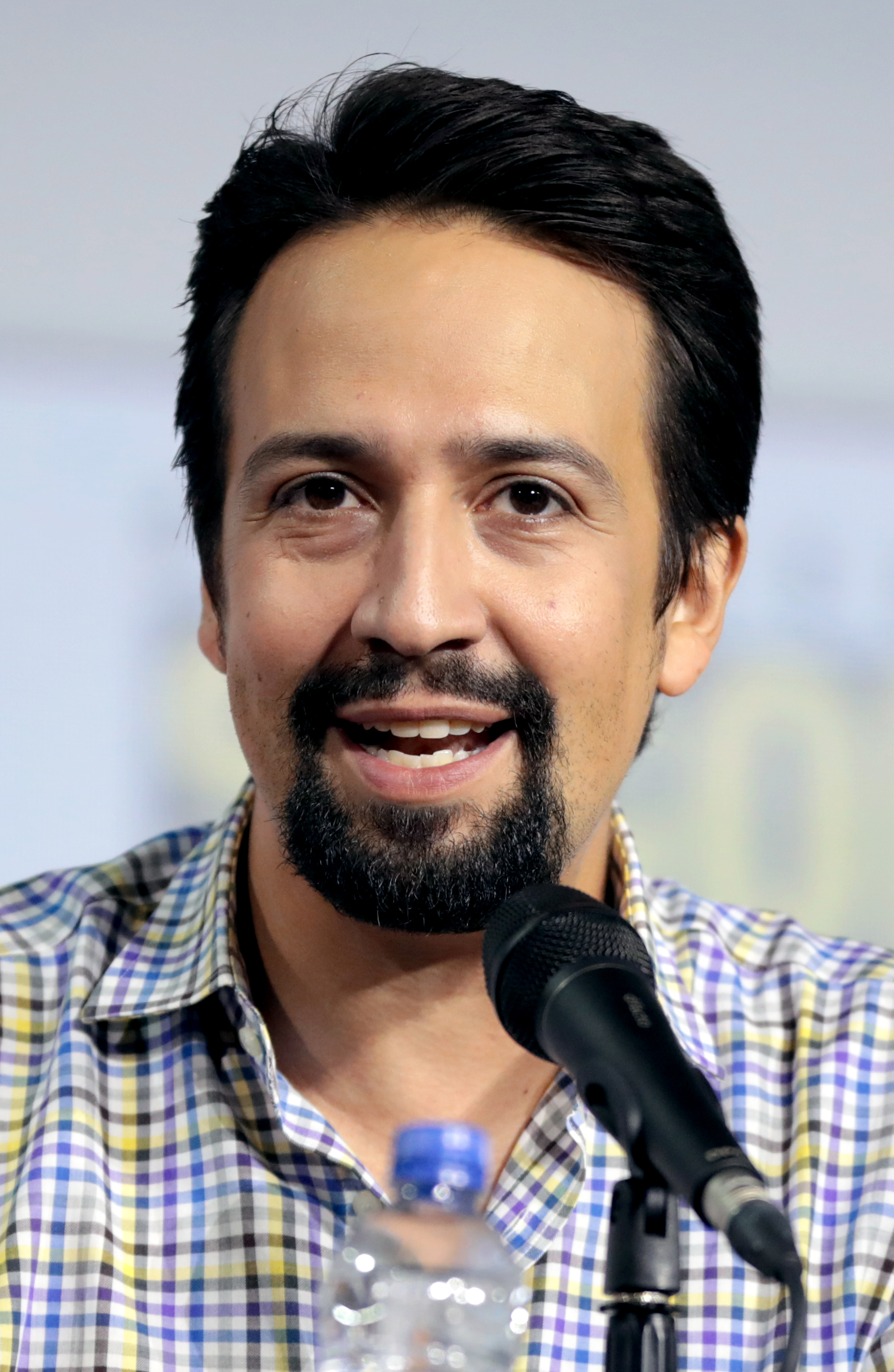
American actor, playwright and musician Lin-Manuel Miranda wrote the original songs for Encanto

In June 2020, American singer-songwriter Lin-Manuel Miranda, who had previously worked on Moana (2016), revealed that he had begun to write the music of American animated musical film Encanto, which would have eight original songs in both Spanish and English, and was set for release in 2021. After the film's premiere, Miranda disclosed that he had been writing songs for the film from the very beginning (that is, starting in 2016). Miranda and the filmmakers travelled to Colombia in 2018 to research and study the country, its culture and music. On September 8, 2021, Germaine Franco, co-composer of the songs from Coco (2017), began to score the film. Composer John Powell was named in the film's credits as a score advisor for the music; this was the first time he had returned to work on a Disney Animation film since Bolt (2008).

Encanto (Original Motion Picture Soundtrack) was released to streaming services on November 19, 2021. The film was theatrically released in the United States on November 24, 2021, in RealD 3D and Dolby Cinema. An exclusive CD, including a poster, was made available via Target on December 17, while picture discs were sold by Walmart. The soundtrack was released in a total of 46 languages.

== Music and lyrics ==
The soundtrack for download or streaming consists of 44 tracks, 32 of which are present on the CD release. There are 8 original songs and an English-language version of the track "Dos Oruguitas". The download also includes instrumental versions of the songs. The download contains 27 score compositions, 23 of which are also present on the CD release.

Drawing from the diverse music of Colombia, the soundtrack of Encanto is a Latin-pop album combining bambuco, salsa, tango, vallenato, reggaeton, cumbia, bachata, hip hop, folk, and funk with theatre music. It incorporates the folk instruments of Colombia, such as marimba, accordion, tiple, tambora, guacharaca, caja, maracas, arpa llanera, bandolas, and cuatros. The lyrics are in English and Spanish languages, (Note: The album was originally written in English and Spanish languages, but has been translated, recorded and released in 44 other languages.) and are about the film's central characters—a multi-generational family called the Madrigals, who wield magical powers gifted to them by "the miracle", except the lead protagonist Mirabel Madrigal who does not possess any gift.

=== Songs ===
The opening song "The Family Madrigal" was inspired by "Belle", the opener of Beauty and the Beast (1991). It is a vallenato tune, sung by American actress Stephanie Beatriz. Mirabel introduces the Madrigals and their unique magical gifts in the song. Also performed by Beatriz, "Waiting on a Miracle" is a bambuco song, written as Mirabel's "I Want" song. During the 2018 research trip to Colombia, the filmmakers noticed that local musicians in Barichara were playing Colombian music on guitars and tiples in a 3/4 waltz time signature. Miranda wrote the song in that time signature to symbolize how Mirabel is in a "different rhythmic universe than the rest of her family".

"We Don't Talk About Bruno"
A sample of the fourth track, "We Don't Talk About Bruno", a midtempo guajira tune that has been the album's best-selling song after going viral on TikTok.

"What Else Can I Do?"
The fifth track, "What Else Can I Do?", is an uptempo Latin rock song driven by electric guitars and live drums.

The third track, "Surface Pressure", is a reggaeton song with a synth-line, performed by American actress Jessica Darrow. Luisa Madrigal, one of Mirabel's elder sisters, expresses her insecurities and the stress she feels from her family in the song, describing the weight of responsibility. Miranda stated he wrote the song inspired by his elder sister. "We Don't Talk About Bruno" is an ensemble number, featuring verses by Pepa, Félix, Dolores, Camilo and Isabela Madrigal, who are Mirabel's aunt, uncle, cousins, and elder sister, respectively. It is sung by Colombian singers Carolina Gaitán and Mauro Castillo, American singer Adassa, American actor Rhenzy Feliz, and American actress Diane Guerrero, respectively. "We Don't Talk About Bruno" fuses various genres, such as salsa, guajira, Cuban folk, hip hop, and dance styles. It sees the characters list their perspectives of Mirabel's uncle, Bruno Madrigal, who became ostracized from his family after sharing unsettling visions.

"What Else Can I Do?" is a "Shakira-esque" rock ballad. Mostly sung by Guerrero, the song shows Isabela free herself of the "need to be perfect". "Dos Oruguitas" is a violin-driven acoustic ballad. Miranda stated it was the hardest song to write and that it became his first song written entirely in Spanish-language. To make it sound like an authentic Colombian folk song, Miranda insisted on writing the song first in Spanish, rather than writing first in English and translating into Spanish later. It was recorded by Colombian singer-songwriter Sebastián Yatra. Miranda looked to songwriters like Joan Manuel Serrat and Antônio Carlos Jobim for the song's inspiration. "Dos Oruguitas" plays when Alma Madrigal, Mirabel's maternal grandmother ("Abuela") and the matriarch of the family, loses her husband Pedro while fleeing gunmen involved in an armed conflict. It is regarded as the emotional centerpiece of the album. "All of You" is the final musical number, sung by the entire cast. It is a culmination of melodies and musical sections from all of its preceding songs. "Colombia, Mi Encanto" is a non-diegetic track sung by Carlos Vives. It is an upbeat, radio-friendly dance-pop tune intended as a tribute to Colombia. It is played twice in the film: when Antonio Madrigal, Mirabel's cousin, gets his gift and again from the film's closing scenes to the ending credits.

== Critical reception ==
Professional ratings
Aggregate scores
Source	Rating
Metacritic	75/100
Review scores
Source	Rating
AllMusic	3.6/5 stars
Rolling Stone	4/5 stars
Filmtracks	4/5 stars
Sputnikmusic	3.5/5

Receiving widespread acclaim, the soundtrack was a critical success and was often acclaimed in the film's reviews. Mark Kennedy of Associated Press, Edward Porter of The Sunday Times, John Lui of The Straits Times, Mini Chibber of The Hindu, Declan Burke of Irish Examiner, Whelan Barzey of Time Out, Katie Walsh of Los Angeles Times, Richard Roeper of Chicago Sun Times, Mark Feeney of The Boston Globe, Caroline Siede of The A.V. Club, Robbie Collin of The Daily Telegraph, and Chris Hewitt of Star Tribune have identified the music as one of the best aspects of the film. The songs have been praised for helping youngsters understand intergenerational trauma and the damage caused by repressing truth.

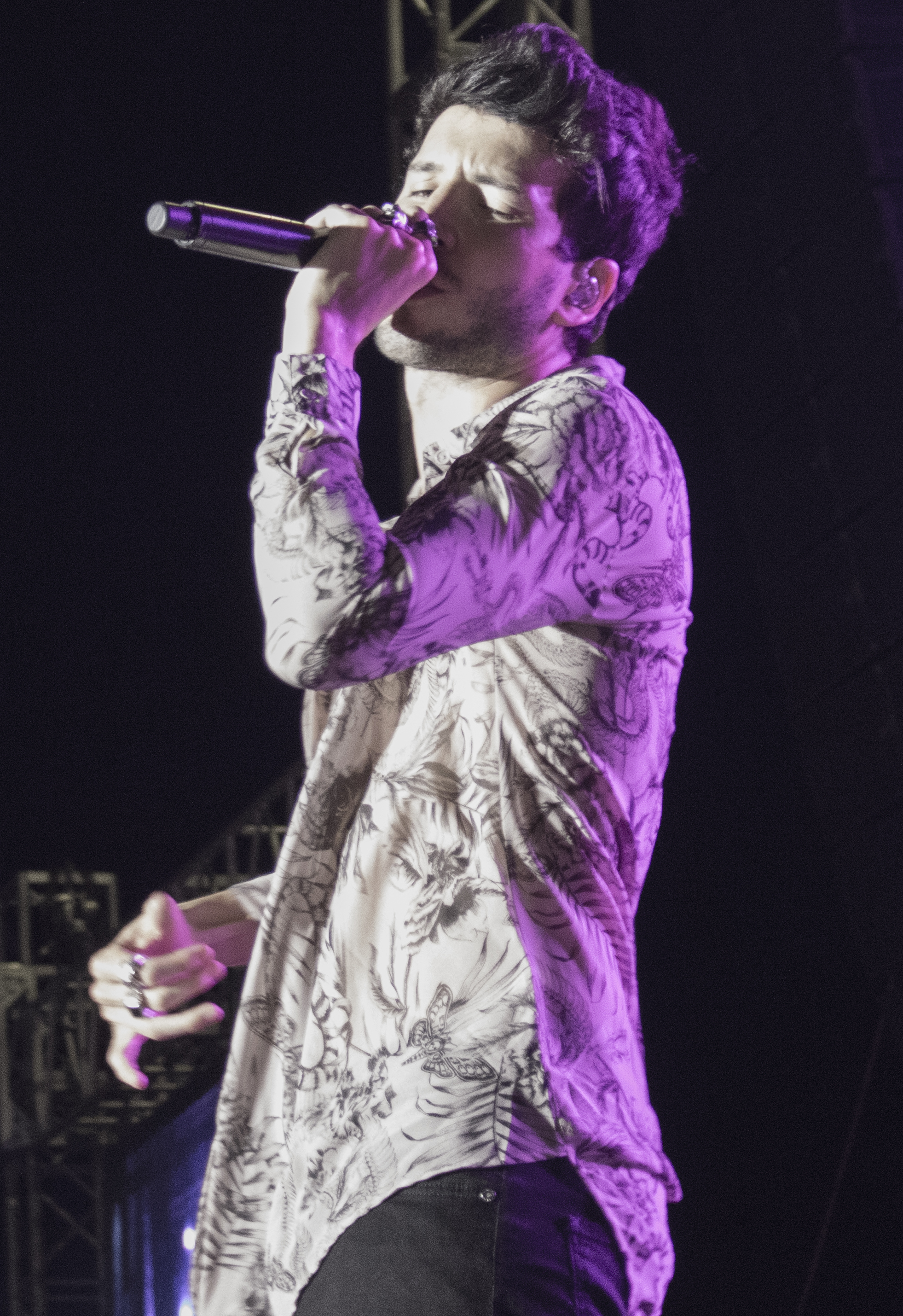
Colombian singer-songwriter Sebastián Yatra performed "Dos Oruguitas", which has been named by critics as the album's best song.

Variety writer Davis Clayton reviewed the soundtrack as "a quintessential sensation" by "all measures". Jeremy Crabb of Screen Rant wrote "Encanto's soundtrack vividly sets the mood for this film's heartfelt, animated story", bolstered by its bold ballads and quiet, reflective songs, and picked "We Don't Talk About Bruno" as the best song. Billboard critics dubbed "We Don't Talk About Bruno" as the most memorable track, but picked "Dos Origuitas" as the best track for being a heartfelt ballad with "emotional resonance and beautiful sentimentality". TheWrap's Drew Taylor also ranked "Dos Oruguitas" as the best song, and "We Don't Talk About Bruno" as the runner-up. Francesca Steele of i stated Encanto boasts a "dizzying" soundtrack "deeply woven into the characterisation". Steele appreciated Disney for embracing a different musical direction and complex ensemble pieces and dubbed it their best music since Frozen (2013). The Independent critic Clarisse Loughrey opined that many of the tracks are characteristic of Miranda's work in his musicals In the Heights or Hamilton, where "melodies will weave in and out of each other to reach a dizzying, final climax". Luke Goodsell of the ABC said the songs are Miranda's "seemingly inescapable" sounds and "vibrant musical numbers", displaying the diversity of Latin music. On the contrary, Stephen Thompson of NPR felt the songs were lackluster.

== Commercial performance ==
Encanto (Original Motion Picture Soundtrack) was a huge commercial success. The album and its songs topped several streaming and record charts around the world. According to Rolling Stone, the unexpected success has "largely boggled critics, who have approached its resounding popularity like a riddle they've been asked to solve."

=== Albums charts ===
The soundtrack topped the US Billboard 200 chart for nine weeks as the second longest-reigning number-one album of the 2020s decade, behind Dangerous: The Double Album (2020) by American singer Morgan Wallen. It was the first Disney soundtrack since Frozen II (2019) to reach the top spot, and marked the sixth time an animated film's soundtrack topped the chart in its history, following The Lion King (1994), Pocahontas (1995), Curious George (2006), Frozen (2013) and Frozen II, all of which are Walt Disney productions except Curious George. Billboard reported that the soundtrack is only the third album in history to debut in one of the last four spots of the Billboard 200 (197–200) and eventually make it to number one, the others being Led Zeppelin's Led Zeppelin II (1969) and the Monkees' Headquarters (1967).

It debuted at number 197 on the Billboard 200, rose to number 110 the next week, and eventually climbed to number seven on the chart. The soundtrack reached number one on the Billboard 200 chart dated January 15, 2022, dethroning Adele's 30 (2021) by earning 72,000 album-equivalent units, which comprises 88 million streams and 11,000 album sales. The next week, it slipped to number three following the debuts of Gunna's DS4Ever and the Weeknd's Dawn FM at the top two spots, before ascending to the number one spot once again in the following week with 104,000 units. It earned its highest consumption in its third chart-topping week—115,000 units—consisting of 19,000 sales and 138.51 million streams. Furthermore, the album topped the US Independent Albums and Soundtrack Albums charts, and the UK Compilation Chart for multiple weeks.

Elsewhere, the album has reached number one in Australia, Canada and New Zealand, number five in Austria, the Netherlands, Norway, Spain and in the Belgian region of Wallonia, number eight in Belgium's Flanders, number nine in Denmark, number 11 in Switzerland, number 14 in Germany, number 18 in Finland, number 25 in France, number 27 in Italy, and number 54 in Lithuania.

The soundtrack placed 17th on Billboard's 2024 year-end Soundtracks chart and 18th on the 2025 year-end Soundtracks chart. On Billboard's 2025 year-end Kid Albums chart, the soundtrack ranked 10th.

=== Songs charts ===
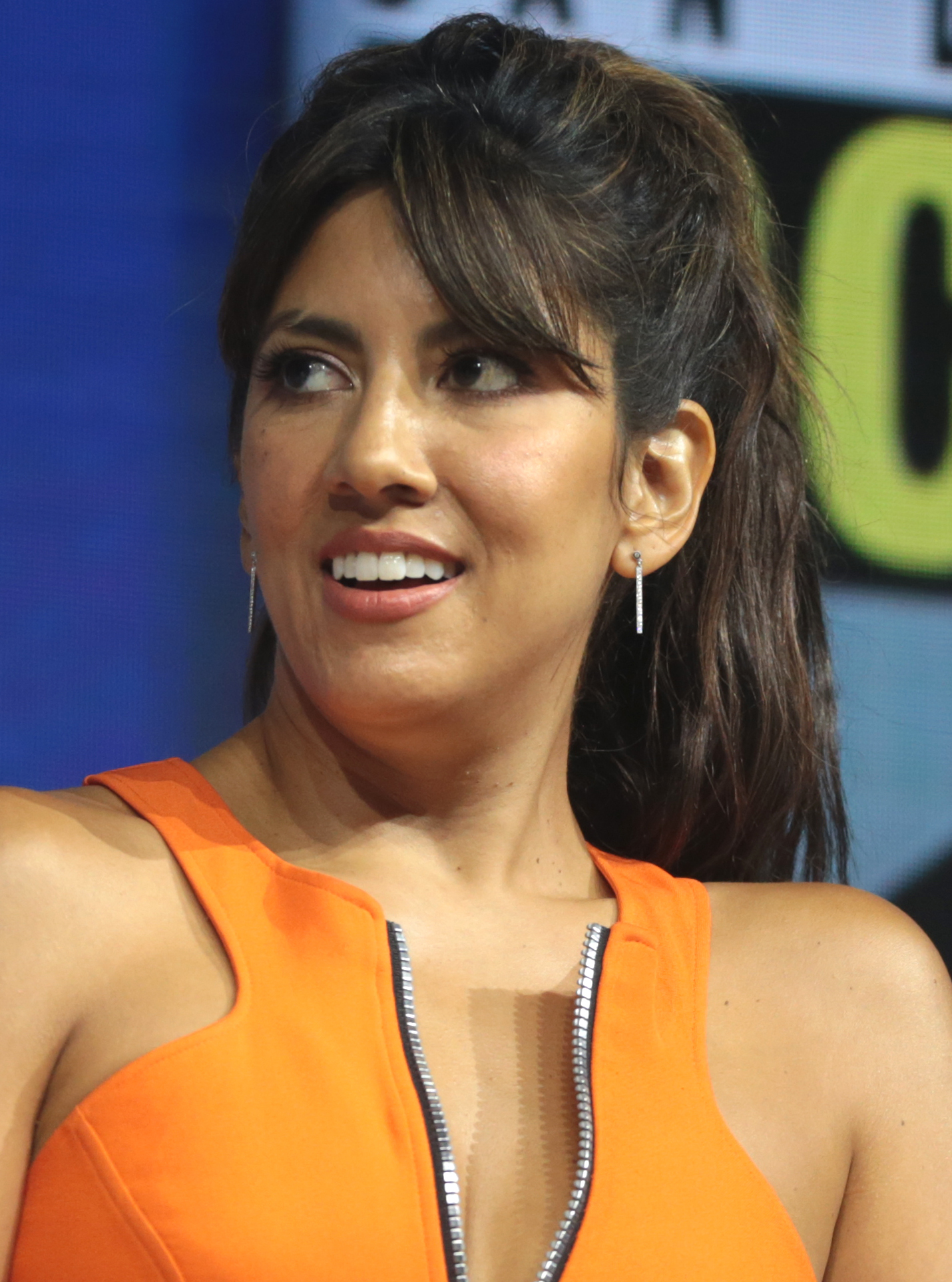
American actress Stephanie Beatriz, the voice of the protagonist Mirabel Madrigal, contributes vocals to five songs.

"We Don't Talk About Bruno" was the soundtrack's most popular song, surging on various digital music platforms. It reached number one on the Spotify Top 50 US chart on January 10, 2022, ahead of the tracks from the Weeknd's Dawn FM, which was released that week, and eventually topped YouTube, iTunes and Apple Music charts. USA Today called the song "the first breakout hit of 2022" and a "Frozen-style phenomenon". According to Slate critic Chris Molanphy, "the organic nature of the audience landing on 'We Don't Talk About Bruno' really is the marketplace picking the single and that's quite unusual, especially for an animated film".

All of the album's original songs appeared on the US Billboard Hot 100, led by "We Don't Talk About Bruno", which first appeared at number 50 and rose to number one, surpassing Frozen's "Let It Go" (2013) as the highest charting Disney song since 1992. "Surface Pressure", reaching number eight, made Encanto the first Disney animated film to have generated multiple top-10 songs on the Hot 100. "The Family Madrigal" peaked at number 20, "What Else Can I Do?" at number 27, "Dos Oruguitas" at number 36, "Waiting on a Miracle" at number 48, "All of You" at number 71, and "Colombia, Mi Encanto" at number 100. Buoyed by the chart performances of the soundtrack and its songs, Miranda topped the Hot 100 Songwriters chart for the first time in his career. "What Else Can I Do?" was the 72nd most-streamed song of 2022 in the United States.

On the UK Singles Chart, "We Don't Talk About Bruno", "Surface Pressure" and "The Family Madrigal" charted at numbers one, four and seven, respectively. "We Don't Talk About Bruno" is the first-ever original Disney song to top the chart, while Encanto becomes the first animated film soundtrack to simultaneously place three songs in the chart's top ten.

In Ireland, "We Don't Talk About Bruno", "Surface Pressure" and "The Family Madrigal" peaked at numbers one, eight and 19, respectively, on the Irish Singles Chart.

== Awards and nominations ==
The soundtrack, and its tracks "Dos Oruguitas" and "Colombia, Mi Encanto" have been nominated for various awards. Miranda and Franco were also nominated individually. The film's music received two Academy Award nominations at the 94th Academy Awards: Best Original Score and Best Original Song for "Dos Oruguitas". It also won the 2022 Annie Award for Outstanding Achievement for Music in a Feature Production.

== Impact ==
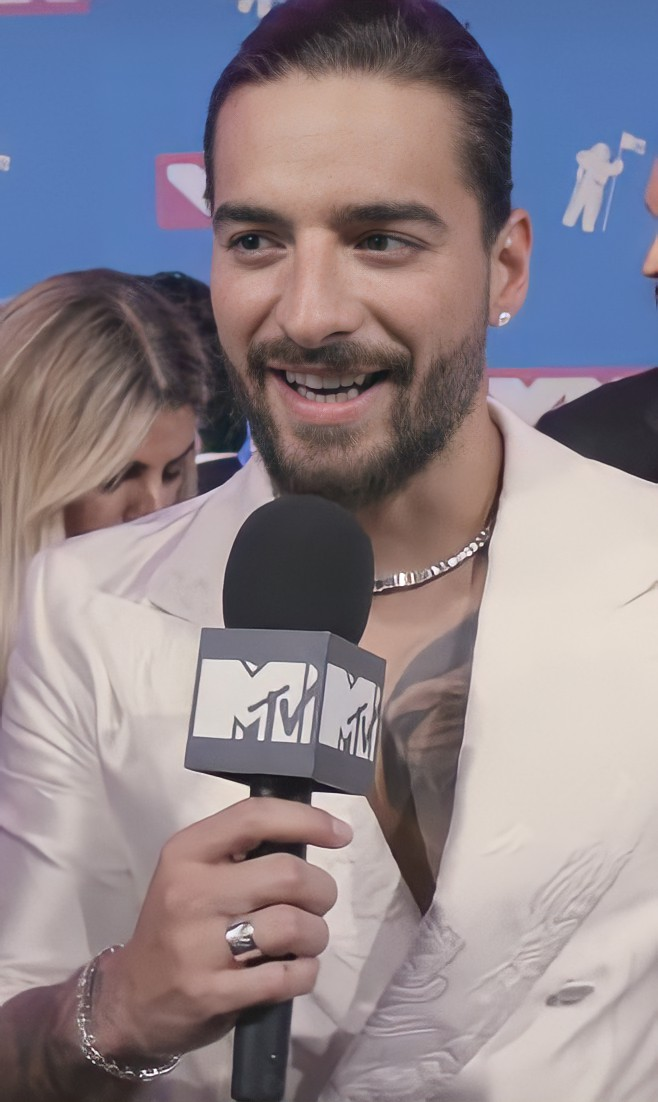
Colombian singer Maluma is featured on the track "All of You" as the voice of Mariano Guzman.

The soundtrack of Encanto was a viral phenomenon, enjoying widespread popularity on the internet. Far Out called it "Encanto-mania" and a "crossover pop phenomenon". The TikTok videos tagged with the hashtag "#encanto" have received more than 27.7 billion views in total, as of June 20, 2022. Billboard editor Jason Lipshutz compared "We Don't Talk About Bruno" to the "meteoric rise" of Olivia Rodrigo's breakthrough single "Driver's License" in January 2021. He said "We Don't Talk About Bruno" is propelled by high Spotify streams and trending TikTok videos like "Drivers License" and explained that audiences "look for the next big thing following the usual glut of Christmas music and fall releases from major artists". In agreement, Mikael Wood, the pop music critic of Los Angeles Times, made the same comparison and stated Encanto becoming "2022's first widespread cultural phenomenon" has turned Miranda into a pop star and an "increasingly powerful showbiz figure". Wood also remarked Miranda's will for "cultural representation".

Patrick Ryan of USA Today cited RIAA (Recording Industry Association of America) reports on Latin music revenues, which grew for a fifth consecutive year in the US in 2020, and highlighted the presence of "Colombian hitmakers" Maluma and Sebastián Yatra featured on the soundtrack, summarizing "it's no wonder that Encanto has enjoyed crossover appeal". /Film's BJ Colangelo called the soundtrack "The Biggest Thing In The World" (on January 10, 2022), while CinemaBlend writer Rachel Romean stated the album "has proven that it can stand on its own two feet even outside of the film". Associated Press journalist Jake Coyle called it a pop culture sensation, saying "the music of Encanto was suddenly everywhere. Everyone was talking about Bruno".

Johanna Ferreira of PopSugar wrote that the success of both the film and the soundtrack speaks to "not just the importance and significance of this type of representation in animated films, but also how movies like this are really changing how Latinx stories are being told". Variety said the film "cut through the cultural clutter, producing a series of resounding hits that are forever ingrained on the psyche of children, their parents and anyone who just happened to be in the general vicinity while the film was playing."

On October 28, 2022, it was announced that the Encanto Live-to-Film Concert Experience at the Hollywood Bowl taking place on November 11 and 12 would be filmed for Disney+ and released as Encanto at the Hollywood Bowl and released on December 28.

== Track listing ==
All songs are written by Lin-Manuel Miranda. All scores are composed by Germaine Franco.

Encanto (Original Motion Picture Soundtrack) both in download and on CD
No.	Title	Performer(s)	Length
1.	"The Family Madrigal"	Stephanie Beatriz, Olga Merediz & cast of Encanto	4:18
2.	"Waiting on a Miracle"	Beatriz	2:42
3.	"Surface Pressure"	Jessica Darrow	3:24
4.	"We Don't Talk About Bruno"	Adassa, Beatriz, Mauro Castillo, Rhenzy Feliz, Carolina Gaitán, Diane Guerrero & cast of Encanto	3:37
5.	"What Else Can I Do?"	Beatriz & Guerrero	3:00
6.	"Dos Oruguitas"	Sebastián Yatra	3:35
7.	"All of You"	Adassa, Beatriz, John Leguizamo, Merediz, Maluma & cast of Encanto	4:39
8.	"¡Hola Casita!"		0:47
9.	"Colombia, Mi Encanto"	Carlos Vives	2:56
10.	"Two Oruguitas"	Yatra	3:35
11.	"Abre Los Ojos"		3:17
12.	"Meet La Familia"		2:09
13.	"I Need You"		2:28
14.	"Antonio's Voice"		2:15
15.	"El Baile Madrigal"		2:51
16.	"The Cracks Emerge"		1:23
17.	"Tenacious Mirabel"		1:36
18.	"Breakfast Questions"		1:26
19.	"Bruno's Tower"		0:53
20.	"Mirabel's Discovery"		2:57
21.	"The Dysfunctional Tango"		2:43
22.	"Chasing the Past"		2:27
23.	"Family Allies"		1:16
24.	"The Ultimate Vision"		2:11
25.	"Isabela La Perfecta"		1:21
26.	"Las Hermanas Pelean"		1:18
27.	"The House Knows"		1:29
28.	"La Candela"		3:21
29.	"El Río"		1:28
30.	"It Was Me"		1:21
31.	"El Camino De Mirabel"		2:10
32.	"Mirabel's Cumbia"		2:49

Encanto (Original Motion Picture Soundtrack) only in download, not on CD
No.	Title	Length
33.	"The Rat's Lair"	1:22
34.	"Tío Bruno"	2:24
35.	"Impresiones Del Encanto"	2:30
36.	"La Cumbia De Mirabel" (featuring Christian Camilo Peña)	2:47
37.	"The Family Madrigal" (Instrumental)	4:18
38.	"Waiting on a Miracle" (Instrumental)	2:42
39.	"Surface Pressure" (Instrumental)	3:23
40.	"We Don't Talk About Bruno" (Instrumental)	3:36
41.	"What Else Can I Do?" (Instrumental)	3:00
42.	"Dos Oruguitas" (Instrumental)	3:35
43.	"All of You" (Instrumental)	4:54
44.	"Colombia, Mi Encanto" (Instrumental)	2:55
Total length:		114:42

== Charts ==
=== Weekly charts ===
Weekly chart performance of Encanto (Original Motion Picture Soundtrack)
Chart (2021–2022)	Peak position
Australian Albums (ARIA)	1
Austrian Albums (Ö3 Austria)	5
Belgian Albums (Ultratop Flanders)	8
Belgian Albums (Ultratop Wallonia)	5
Canadian Albums (Billboard)	1
Danish Albums (Hitlisten)	9
Dutch Albums (Album Top 100)	4
Finnish Albums (Suomen virallinen lista)	18
French Albums (SNEP)	13
German Albums (Offizielle Top 100)	8
Italian Albums (FIMI)	27
Lithuanian Albums (AGATA)	54
New Zealand Albums (RMNZ)	1
Norwegian Albums (VG-lista)	5
Spanish Albums (Promusicae)	5
Swiss Albums (Schweizer Hitparade)	10
UK Compilation Albums (OCC)	1
US Billboard 200	1
US Independent Albums (Billboard)	1
US Kid Albums (Billboard)	1
US Soundtrack Albums (Billboard)	1

Weekly chart performance of Encanto (Banda Sonora Original en Español)
Chart (2021–2022)	Peak position
US Latin Pop Albums (Billboard)	13

=== Year-end charts ===
2022 year-end chart performance for Encanto (Original Motion Picture Soundtrack)
Chart (2022)	Position
Australian Albums (ARIA)	15
Austrian Albums (Ö3 Austria)	34
Belgian Albums (Ultratop Flanders)	38
Belgian Albums (Ultratop Wallonia)	33
Canadian Albums (Billboard)	12
Dutch Albums (Album Top 100)	37
French Albums (SNEP)	61
German Albums (Offizielle Top 100)	52
New Zealand Albums (RMNZ)	19
Spanish Albums (PROMUSICAE)	26
Swiss Albums (Schweizer Hitparade)	54
US Billboard 200	6
US Independent Albums (Billboard)	2
US Soundtrack Albums (Billboard)	1

2023 year-end chart performance for Encanto (Original Motion Picture Soundtrack)
Chart (2023)	Position
US Billboard 200	187
US Independent Albums (Billboard)	26
US Soundtrack Albums (Billboard)	4

2024 year-end chart performance for Encanto (Original Motion Picture Soundtrack)
Chart (2024)	Position
US Soundtrack Albums (Billboard)	17

2025 year-end chart performance for Encanto (Original Motion Picture Soundtrack)
Chart (2025)	Position
US Soundtrack Albums (Billboard)	18

== Certifications ==
Certifications for Encanto (Original Motion Picture Soundtrack)
Region	Certification	Certified units/sales
Belgium (BRMA)	Platinum	20,000^{‡}
Canada (Music Canada)	Platinum	80,000^{‡}
Denmark (IFPI Danmark)	Gold	10,000^{‡}
France (SNEP)	Platinum	100,000^{‡}
Italy (FIMI)	Gold	25,000^{‡}
New Zealand (RMNZ)	Platinum	15,000^{‡}
Spain (Promusicae)	Gold	20,000^{‡}
Switzerland (IFPI Switzerland)	Platinum	20,000^{‡}
United Kingdom (BPI)	Platinum	300,000^{‡}
United States (RIAA)	2× Platinum	2,000,000^{‡}
^{‡} Sales+streaming figures based on certification alone.

== See also ==
- List of Billboard 200 number-one albums of 2022
- List of number-one albums of 2022 (Canada)
- List of UK Compilation Chart number ones of the 2020s
