= Surface Pressure =

2021 song from animated film Encanto

Promotional single by Jessica Darrow

from the album Encanto (Original Motion Picture Soundtrack)
- Released: November 19, 2021
- Genre: Reggaeton
- Length: 3:22
- Label: Walt Disney
- Songwriter: Lin-Manuel Miranda
- Producer: Lin-Manuel Miranda

Music video
- "Surface Pressure" on YouTube

"Surface Pressure" is a song from Disney's 2021 animated musical film Encanto, released by Walt Disney Records as part of the film's soundtrack on November 19, 2021. It is a cumbia-inspired reggaeton song written by American singer-songwriter Lin-Manuel Miranda and performed by American actor Jessica Darrow in their role as Luisa Madrigal. "Surface Pressure" details the struggles of Luisa, who wields the magical "gift" of superhuman strength and hence faces the stresses of being the reliable older sister in her family—the Madrigals.

The song garnered Darrow's first-ever appearances on various charts around the world. It reached number eight on the US Billboard Hot 100, making Encanto the first Disney film to produce two top-10 songs on the Hot 100, following the chart-topper "We Don't Talk About Bruno". Elsewhere, "Surface Pressure" has peaked at number three in the United Kingdom, number seven in Ireland, number 12 in Canada, number 18 in Australia, and number 26 in New Zealand. It reached number 9 on the Billboard Global 200. Critics praised the song's lyrical substance, Darrow's vocal techniques, and the production atypical of traditional Disney songs.

== Background ==
"Surface Pressure" is a song featured in the 2021 American animated musical fantasy film Encanto. It appears as the third track on the film's soundtrack, released by Walt Disney Records. American actor Jessica Darrow performed the vocals of the song, which was written and produced by American musician Lin-Manuel Miranda. In the film, "Surface Pressure" is a song focusing on Luisa Madrigal, one of the older sisters of the main protagonist Mirabel Madrigal.

== Lyrics and composition ==
"Surface Pressure" is a reggaeton song with cumbia elements. Known as "the buff lady", Luisa is the always obliging second-oldest sister of Mirabel Madrigal, the film's protagonist. In their magical Madrigal family, Mirabel is the ordinary one as she does not have a superpower. As the third generation of the family grows into adulthood, cracks begin to appear in the walls of their "enchanted" casita, which leads Mirabel on a mission to find out what is diminishing their magic. She seeks help from Luisa, who is muscular and tough and has superhuman strength. However, Mirabel's question of "what's wrong" is met with an emotional meltdown in the form of a musical track from Luisa that sees her letting down her guard, admitting her fears and weaknesses. As her strength is no longer her prominent feature, the cracks in their family dynamic begin to show more. Luisa eventually becomes the first one to lose her gift, because she, her family, and the townspeople put too much pressure on her. Writing for Collider, Sebastian Stoddard said Luisa "is the reason the journey of the movie exists at all; had she not been in her position and lost her gift, it may have taken far longer for the family to notice anything wrong with their Miracle".

"Surface Pressure"
A sample of the song's chorus.

Darrow sings "Surface Pressure" in a "muscular" contralto. The song contains Miranda's "typically dexterous lyrics", over a "thrumming" beat. In the bridge, Luisa flies through an imaginary sea of pink clouds, wondering what would happen if she were to "shake the crushing weight of expectations" and take a break; the beat kicks back in, only for her to be pulled down into the same "drip, drip, drip" yet again.

The song begins with a series of proclamations: "I'm the strong one / I'm not nervous / I'm as tough as the crust of the earth is / I move mountains / I move churches / And I glow 'cause I know what my worth is". Later, Luisa exposes her vulnerability: "Under the surface I feel berserk as a tightrope walker in a three-ring circus / Under the surface / Was Hercules ever like 'Yo, I don't wanna fight Cerberus?' / Under the surface I'm pretty sure I'm worthless if I can't be of service". This confession illustrates how, underneath her strong appearance, she feels the weight of the world on her shoulders because of the burdens and responsibilities she carries as the older sibling. In a "deceptively coolly" tone, she sings of the "drip, drip, drip that'll never stop", a metaphorical line about how one final crack will break the whole house (and herself) down. However, Luisa also speaks of how, despite going out of her way to help everyone, she does not fall: "watch as she buckles and bends but never breaks".

Miranda explained that the song is an homage to his sister, Luz Miranda-Crespo: "That song is my love letter and apology to my sister. I watched my sister deal with the pressure of being the oldest and carrying burdens I never had to carry [...] I put all of that angst and all of those moments into Luisa". Encanto director Byron Howard said Miranda's lyrics added more depth to Luisa: "She's a fun, comedic, and broad character but to have this grounded soul really changed the way we saw her as she moved through the script". Jared Bush, one of the film's directors, explained why it was important for them to explore the differences in modern-day communities, particularly with a unique character such as Luisa: "One of the benefits of putting a giant extended family on screen was that there are so many different types of people, certainly in this large family from Colombia, where there's naturally this amazing mix between European and Indigenous and African [communities] coming in together as one family". Darrow herself deemed the song an example of how music is an emotional escape: "When the struggle gets real, we turn the music louder. Even though there's something going on in the inside, it's all good on the outside and you have a good time…It's a journey that I think Disney music does [well]".

== Critical reception ==
Kristy Puchko of Mashable described Luisa as a tribute and called her "bold, buff, beautiful, with a beguiling swagger". Puchko found her to be a "dazzling vision of feminine strength" because of her physical abilities, countering that the song "makes her messier, more complicated, more real, and thereby a terrific representation of what it means to be a big sister. Because — as Luisa expresses — the gifts that define us can begin to feel like a trap. Like if we aren't always strong, we've failed everyone". Puchko called it a "supreme sucker punch of a song", writing: "there's a lot of lovely songs in Encanto, there are none that hit harder than that ['Surface Pressure']". The Indian Telegraph said the song is "for all the big sisters out there".

Jackson McHenry of Vulture noted how Lin-Manuel Miranda has honed a talent for writing about the stress of over-achievers, referencing Hamilton's "Non-Stop" and "Breathe" from In the Heights. McHenry opined that the inspiration for "Surface Pressure" can most likely be found in Miranda's lyrics to the songs in Bring It On: The Musical, such as "What I Was Born to Do" and particularly "One Perfect Moment", deemed by McHenry an extended version of the bridge on "Surface Pressure".

The song became a representation for some women on the video-sharing app TikTok, as they visualized how they relate to Luisa's impassioned struggle. Some users include stories about the narratives of carrying the emotional weight of being an older sister, while others expressed how the song calls them out for adding pressure to their bigger sister/brother.

Collider's Sebastian Stoddard said the song "explains the struggle [of being an older sibling] perfectly. The first time you hear it, there's so many lyrics that stand out". Michael Ordoña of the Los Angeles Times called the song a "colorful depiction of her supernaturally strong character's secret struggles". After the song broke into the top 10 of the Billboard Hot 100, Jackson McHenry of Vulture said: "[...] the key thrill here is that 'Surface Pressure', the actual best song in Encanto, is getting the attention it deserves. Finally we have an excuse to talk about the best Madrigal family member". McHenry also noted that it should be acknowledged "that Disney messed up big-time and decided to only submit the act-two love song 'Dos Oruguitas' for awards contention, ignoring both 'Bruno' and 'Surface Pressure'". Quinci LeGardye of Marie Claire called it a "standout song", labeling it "an anthem to perfectionists everywhere".

== Commercial performance ==
For the week of January 8, 2022, "Surface Pressure" debuted at number 54 on the US Billboard Hot 100; it was the second-highest entry of the week, only behind fellow Encanto song "We Don't Talk About Bruno". On the chart dated January 29, the song climbed to number 10, while "We Don't Talk About Bruno" was at number two, making Encanto the first Disney film to have two top-ten entries. It rose to number 9 the following week, and later rose to its peak of number eight.

In the UK, "Surface Pressure" peaked at number three on February 11, 2022, becoming the second song from the film to reach the top five, behind "We Don't Talk About Bruno" at number one that same week.

== Charts ==
=== Weekly charts ===
Weekly chart performance for "Surface Pressure"
Chart (2022)	Peak position
Australia (ARIA)	18
Canada (Canadian Hot 100)	12
Global 200 (Billboard)	9
Iceland (Tónlistinn)	9
Ireland (IRMA)	7
New Zealand (Recorded Music NZ)	26
South Africa Streaming (TOSAC)	84
Sweden Heatseeker (Sverigetopplistan)	2
UK Singles (Official Charts)	3
US Billboard Hot 100	8

=== Year-end charts ===
2022 year-end chart performance for "Surface Pressure"
Chart (2022)	Position
Canada (Canadian Hot 100)	62
Global 200 (Billboard)	125
UK Singles (OCC)	39
US Billboard Hot 100	53

== Certifications ==
Certifications for "Surface Pressure"
Region	Certification	Certified units/sales
Australia (ARIA)	Platinum	70,000^{‡}
Brazil (Pro-Música Brasil)	Gold	20,000^{‡}
Canada (Music Canada)	3× Platinum	240,000^{‡}
New Zealand (RMNZ)	Platinum	30,000^{‡}
United Kingdom (BPI)	Platinum	600,000^{‡}
United States (RIAA)	4× Platinum	4,000,000^{‡}
^{‡} Sales+streaming figures based on certification alone.
