= Surface pressure =

Surface pressure may refer to:

- "Surface Pressure", a song from the film Encanto (2021)
- Surface pressure in physical chemistry
- Surface pressure within the Earth's atmosphere
