= Jessica Darrow =

American actress and singer (born 1995)

Jessica Taylor Darrow
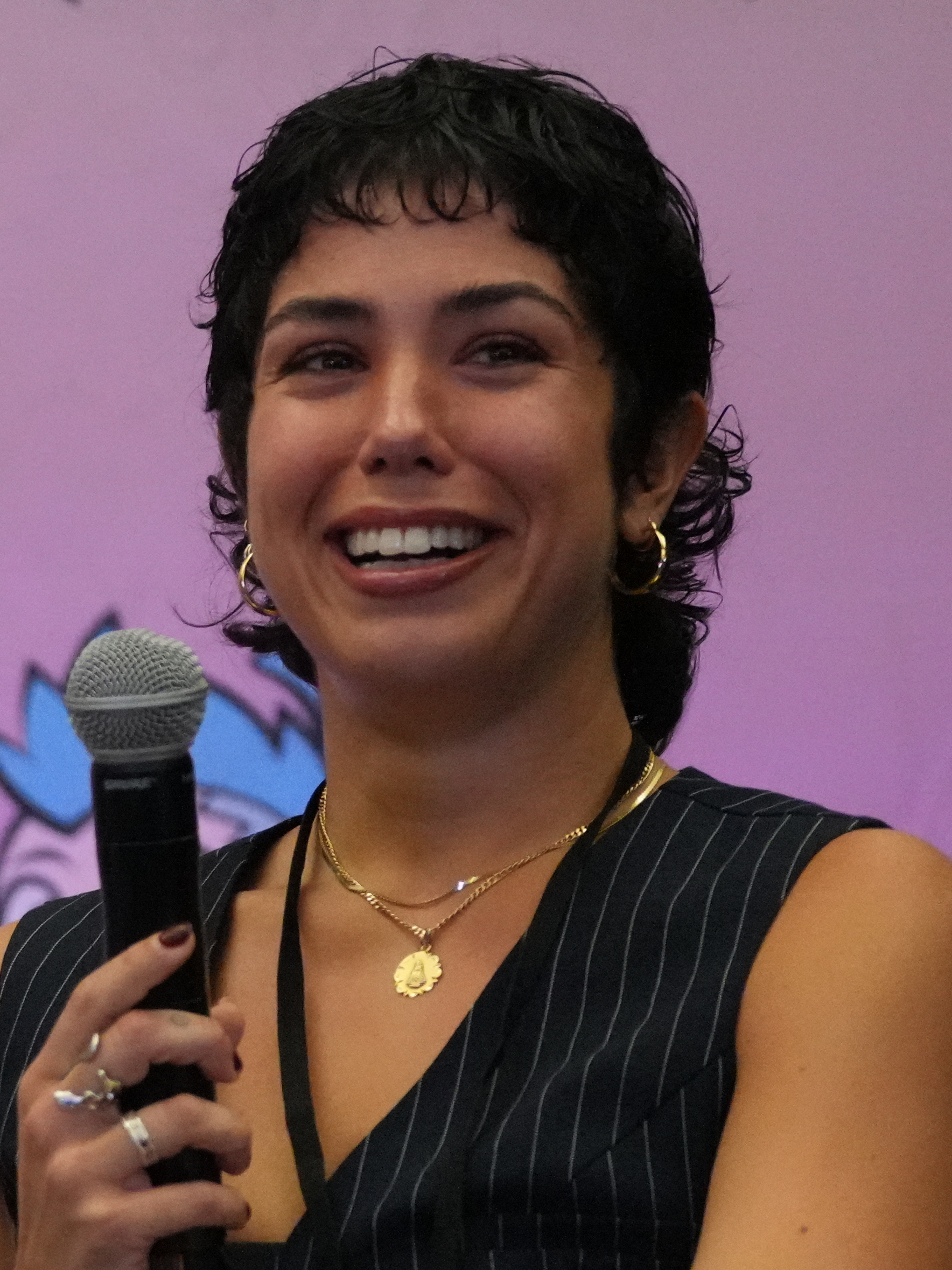
- Darrow at Animate! Des Moines in 2024
- Born: Jessica Taylor Darrow; January 7, 1995 (age 31); Miami, Florida, U.S.
- Education: Rutgers University, New Brunswick (BFA)
- Occupations: Actress; singer
- Years active: 2013–present
- Musical career
- Genres: Reggaetón; urban; pop

Jessica Taylor Darrow (born January 7, 1995) is an American actress and singer best known for voicing the character Luisa Madrigal in Disney's Encanto and for playing Mikki Easton in Fifteen-Love.

== Early life ==
Darrow was born in Miami, Florida. They are of Cuban descent. As a teenager, they watched Disney films and listened to songs written by Lin-Manuel Miranda. Darrow attended and graduated from Rutgers University.

== Career ==
Darrow's first film role was Sarah in the 2019 film Feast of the Seven Fishes, directed by Robert Tinnell. They rose to fame in 2021 acting in the Disney animated feature film Encanto as the voice of Luisa Madrigal. They sang one of the film's most popular songs, "Surface Pressure", which was certified platinum by the RIAA and peaked at number 8 on the Billboard Hot 100 chart in early 2022. Darrow voiced Mimi in Grand Theft Auto Online's 2021 update "Los Santos Tuners."

== Personal life ==
Darrow is nonbinary. They have used they/them and elle/le/e pronouns since December 2025. In an interview for Deadline Hollywood, Darrow voiced their support of the LGBT community in the wake of the Parental Rights in Education Act passage in Miami, where they were born, "Here I am being queer and gorgeous, and I'm on the red carpet, and I'm very happy to represent fellow gorgeous queer people."

== Filmography ==
=== Film ===
Year	Title	Role	Notes
2019	Feast of the Seven Fishes	Sarah	
2021	Encanto	Luisa Madrigal (voice)	

=== Television ===
Year	Title	Role	Notes
2021	Following Hannah Stone	Taylor	TV Mini-Series, Main role
2021	Disney Television Discovers: Talent Showcase	Future Ray	Epísode: "Future Me"
2023	Fifteen-Love	Mikki Easton	6 episodes
2023	Blue Bloods	Isabella	Episode: "Irish Exits"
2023	Hamster & Gretel	Melissa Gomez (voice)	Episode: "The Litigator vs. The Luchador"
2023–2024	Monster High	Skelita Calaveraz, Abuela Calaveraz (voices)	3 episodes
2025	The Residence	Nohelia	1 episode
2025	Elsbeth	Taylor	1 episode
2026	The Bad Guys: The Series	Tanya The Ripper (voice)	2 episodes
TBA	North Woods	Sorcha (voice)	Animated Series, Main role.

=== Video games ===
Year	Title	Voice role	Notes
2021	Grand Theft Auto Online	Mimi	Los Santos Tuners DLC
2026	Disney Speedstorm	Luisa Madrigal	Season 21 Update

=== Web ===
Year	Title	Role	Notes
2019	Anomaly	Kory Hernandez (voice)	Podcast series, Main role
2021	Say It With Pride: Disney+ Celebrates Pride 365	Themself	

=== Miscellaneous work ===
Year	Title	Role	Notes
2027	Antonio's Fiesta de Encanto	Luisa Madrigal (voice)	Disney's Animal Kingdom attraction

== Discography ==
=== Singles ===
==== As lead artist ====
List of singles, with year released, selected chart positions, and album name shown
Title	Year	Peak chart positions					Certifications	Album
Title	Year	US	AUS	CAN	UK	WW	Certifications	Album
"Same Way"	2021	—	—	—	—	—		Non-album single
"Surface Pressure" (from the Disney animated film Encanto)	2021	8	18	12	3	9	RIAA: 3× Platinum; ARIA: Platinum; BPI: Platinum	Encanto (Original Motion Picture Soundtrack)
"Make It Clean"	2022	—	—	—	—	—		Non-album single
"—" denotes songs which were not released in that country or did not chart.

==== Other charted songs ====
List of other charted songs, with year released, selected chart positions, and album name shown
Title	Year	Peak chart positions			Album
Title	Year	US	CAN	WW	Album
"All of You" (with Stephanie Beatriz, Olga Merediz, Adassa, Maluma, and Encanto cast)	2021	71	83	111	Encanto (Original Motion Picture Soundtrack)

=== Music videos ===
- "Same Way (2021)
- "Surface Pressure" (2021)
- "All of You" (2021)
- "Make It Clean" (2022)
