= List of UK Compilation Chart number ones of the 2020s =

This is the list of the number ones of the UK Compilation Chart during the 2020s.

== Number ones ==
Artist (Note: The artist, album, date of reaching number one and number of weeks at number one are those given by the Official Charts Company.)	Album	Record label	Reached number one (week ending)	Weeks at number one
2020
Various Artists	Now That's What I Call Music! 104	EMI/Universal	21 November 2019	8
Original Soundtrack	Frozen II	Walt Disney	16 January 2020	5
Various Artists	Now That's What I Call Music! 104	EMI/Universal	20 February 2020	1
Original Soundtrack	Frozen II	Walt Disney	27 February 2020	1
Various Artists	The Greatest Showman	Atlantic	5 March 2020	3
Various Artists	Now 100 Hits Country	EMI/Sony	26 March 2020	1
Original Soundtrack	Frozen II	Walt Disney	2 April 2020	4
Various Artists	The Greatest Showman	Atlantic	30 April 2020	3
Various Artists	Now That's What I Call Music! 105	EMI/Universal	21 May 2020	8
Original Broadway Cast	Hamilton	Atlantic	16 July 2020	3
Various Artists	Now That's What I Call Music! 106	EMI/Universal	6 August 2020	9
Original Broadway Cast	Hamilton	Atlantic	8 October 2020	1
Various Artists	The Greatest Showman	Atlantic	15 October 2020	1
Various Artists	Now 100 Hits - 80's No.1s	EMI/Universal	22 October 2020	1
Various Artists	The Greatest Showman	Atlantic	29 October 2020	3
Various Artists	Dreamboats & Petticoats-Music That Lives	Decca	13 November 2020	3
Various Artists	Now That's What I Call Music! 107	EMI/Universal	10 December 2020	5
2021
Various Artists	The Greatest Showman	Atlantic	14 January 2021	4
Various Artists	Now 70s Glam Pop	EMI/Sony	11 February 2021	1
Various Artists	The Greatest Showman	Atlantic	18 February 2021	2
Various Artists	Now That's What I Call Country	EMI/Sony	4 March 2021	2
Various Artists	Now The 60s Girls - Then He Kissed Me	EMI/Sony	18 March 2021	2
Various Artists	The Greatest Showman	Atlantic	1 April 2021	1
Various Artists	Now That's What I Call Music! 108	EMI/Universal	8 April 2021	3
Various Artists	Now That's What I Call Music! 12" 80s	EMI/Universal	29 April 2021	1
Various Artists	Now That's What I Call Music! 108	EMI/Universal	6 May 2021	1
Various Artists	Now That's What I Call Eurovision	EMI/Universal	13 May 2021	1
Various Artists	Now That's What I Call Music! 108	EMI/Universal	20 May 2021	2
Various Artists	80's Rock Down	Xploded Music	3 June 2021	1
Various Artists	Now Live Forever - The Anthems	EMI/Universal	10 June 2021	1
Various Artists	The Greatest Showman	Atlantic	17 June 2021	3
Various Artists	Now Yearbook '83	EMI/Universal	2 July 2021	1
Various Artists	The Greatest Showman	Atlantic	9 July 2021	1
Original Soundtrack	Andrew Lloyd Webber's Cinderella	Polydor	16 July 2021	1
Various Artists	Now That's What I Call Gold	EMI/Universal	23 July 2021	1
Various Artists	Now That's What I Call Music! 109	EMI/Universal	30 July 2021	5
Various Artists	Now That's What I Call Music! 12" 80s	EMI/Universal	9 September 2021	1
Various Artists	Now That's What I Call Music! 109	EMI/Universal	16 September 2021	1
Various Artists	The Greatest Showman	Atlantic	23 September 2021	1
Various Artists	Now Boogie Nights: Disco Classics	EMI/Universal	30 September 2021	1
Various Artists	The Best of Bond James Bond	Universal	7 October 2021	2
Various Artists	The Greatest Showman	Atlantic	21 October 2021	3
Various Artists	Now Yearbook '84	EMI/Universal	11 November 2021	1
Various Artists	Now That's What I Call Rock	EMI/Universal	18 November 2021	1
Various Artists	Dreamboats & Petticoats-Bringing On	Decca	25 November 2020	1
Various Artists	Now That's What I Call Music! 110	EMI/Universal	2 December 2021	6
2022
Various Artists	Encanto	Walt Disney	13 January 2022	14
Various Artists	Now That's What I Call Music! 111	EMI/Universal	21 April 2022	3
Various Artists	Encanto	Walt Disney	12 May 2022	2
Various Artists	Eurovision Song Contest: Turin 2022	UMC	26 May 2022	1
Various Artists	Now Yearbook '81	EMI/Universal	2 June 2022	1
Various Artists	Now That's What I Call Timeless	EMI/Universal	9 June 2022	1
Various Artists	Top Gun: Maverick (soundtrack)	Polydor	16 June 2022	2
Various Artists	Now That's What I Call Pride	EMI/Universal	30 June 2022	1
Various Artists	Now That's What I Call a 60s & 70s Summer	EMI/Universal	7 July 2022	1
Various Artists	Now Yearbook Extra '81	EMI/Universal	14 July 2022	1
Various Artists	The Greatest Showman	Atlantic	21 July 2022	1
Various Artists	Now Yearbook '80	EMI/Universal	28 July 2022	1
Various Artists	The Greatest Showman	Atlantic	4 August 2022	1
Various Artists	Now That's What I Call Music! 112	EMI/Universal	11 August 2022	5
Various Artists	Now That's What I Call 12" 70s	EMI/Universal	15 September 2022	1
Various Artists	Now Yearbook '79	EMI/Universal	22 September 2022	1
Various Artists	The Greatest Showman	Atlantic	29 September 2022	4
Various Artists	Now Nineties Dancefloor	EMI/Universal	27 October 2022	1
Various Artists	Now Yearbook Extra '79	EMI/Universal	3 November 2022	1
Various Artists	The Greatest Showman	Atlantic	10 November 2022	1
Various Artists	Now Yearbook '85	EMI/Universal	17 November 2022	1
Various Artists	Now That's What I Call Christmas (2022)	EMI/Universal	24 November 2022	1
Various Artists	Now That's What I Call Music! 113	EMI/Universal	1 December 2022	6
2023
Various Artists	The Greatest Showman	Atlantic	12 January 2023	1
Various Artists	Now Yearbook Extra '85	EMI/Universal	19 January 2023	1
Various Artists	The Greatest Showman	Atlantic	26 January 2023	4
Various Artists	Now Yearbook Extra '80 - '84: The Final Chapter	EMI/Universal	23 February 2023	1
Various Artists	Now Dance - The 80s	EMI/Universal	2 March 2023	1
Various Artists	Now Yearbook '86	EMI/Universal	9 March 2023	1
Various Artists	The Greatest Showman	Atlantic	16 March 2023	1
Various Artists	Now That's What I Call 60s Pop	EMI/Universal	23 March 2023	1
Various Artists	The Greatest Showman	Atlantic	30 March 2023	1
Various Artists	Dance Craze - The Best of British Ska live	Chrysalis	6 April 2023	1
Various Artists	The Greatest Showman	Atlantic	13 April 2023	1
Various Artists	Now Yearbook Extra '86	EMI/Universal	20 April 2023	1
Various Artists	Now That's What I Call Music! 114	EMI/Universal	27 April 2023	2
Various Artists	Now Yearbook '78	EMI/Universal	11 May 2023	1
Various Artists	Guardians of the Galaxy: Awesome Mix Vol. 3	Hollywood	18 May 2023	1
Various Artists	Eurovision Song Contest - Liverpool 2023	Universal	25 May 2023	3
Various Artists	Spider-Man: Across the Spider-Verse (soundtrack)	Republic	15 June 2023	5
Various Artists	Now Yearbook '92	EMI/Universal	20 July 2023	1
Various Artists	Now 12” 80s 1980	EMI/Universal	27 July 2023	1
Original Soundtrack	Barbie the Album	Atlantic	3 August 2023	15
Various Artists	Now Yearbook '88	EMI/Universal	16 November 2023	1
Original Soundtrack	Barbie the Album	Atlantic	23 November 2023	1
Various Artists	Now That's What I Call Music! 116	EMI/Universal	30 November 2023	1
Various Artists	Now That's What I Call 40 Years	EMI/Universal	7 December 2023	1
Various Artists	Now That's What I Call Christmas (2022)	EMI/Universal	14 December 2023	4
2024
Original Soundtrack	Barbie the Album	Atlantic	11 January 2024	1
Original Soundtrack	Wonka	WaterTower Music	18 January 2024	1
Various Artists	Now Yearbook Extra '88	EMI/Universal	25 January 2024	1
Various Artists	Now 12" 80s: 1982 - Part 1	EMI/Universal	1 February 2024	1
Various Artists	The Greatest Showman	Atlantic	8 February 2024	1
Original Soundtrack	Hazbin Hotel (soundtrack)	A24	15 February 2024	6
Various Artists	Now That's What I Call Jukebox Classics	EMI/Universal	28 March 2024	1
Original Soundtrack	Hazbin Hotel (soundtrack)	A24	4 April 2024	2
Various Artists	Now That's What I Call Music! 117	EMI/Universal	18 April 2024	3
Various Artists	The Greatest Showman	Atlantic	9 May 2024	1
Various Artists	Now Yearbook '74	EMI/Universal	16 May 2024	1
Various Artists	Eurovision Song Contest Malmo 2024	Universal	23 May 2024	3
Various Artists	Now That's What I Call Rock Anthems	EMI/Universal	13 June 2024	1
Various Artists	Now Yearbook Extra '74	EMI/Universal	20 June 2024	1
Various Artists	The Greatest Showman	Atlantic	27 June 2024	2
Various Artists	Now Yearbook '93	EMI/Universal	11 July 2024	1
Various Artists	The Greatest Showman	Atlantic	18 July 2024	1
Various Artists	Now That's What I Call 40 Years: Part 2	EMI/Universal	25 July 2024	1
Original Soundtrack	Twisters: The Album	Atlantic	1 August 2024	1
Various Artists	Now That's What I Call Music! 118	EMI/Universal	8 August 2024	2
Various Artists	The Greatest Showman	Atlantic	22 August 2024	3
Various Artists	Now Yearbook '87	EMI/Universal	12 September 2024	1
Various Artists	Now That's What I Call the 80s 2024	EMI/Universal	19 September 2024	1
Various Artists	The Greatest Showman	Atlantic	26 September 2024	4
Various Artists	Saltburn	Polydor	24 October 2024	1
Various Artists	The Greatest Showman	Atlantic	31 October 2024	1
Original Cast Recording	Sunset Blvd : The Album	The Other Songs	7 November 2024	1
Various Artists	Now Yearbook '77	EMI/Universal	14 November 2024	1
Various Artists	The Greatest Showman	Atlantic	21 November 2024	1
Various Artists	Now That's What I Call Music! 119	EMI/Universal	28 November 2024	1
Original Cast Recording	Wicked: The Soundtrack	Republic Records	5 December 2024	16
2025
Various Artists	The Greatest Showman	Atlantic	27 March 2025	2
Various Artists	Now Presents...Clubland	EMI/RCA	10 April 2025	1
Various Artists	Now That's What I Call Music! 120	EMI/Universal	17 April 2025	2
Various Artists	The Greatest Showman	Atlantic	1 May 2025	1
Various Artists	Now Yearbook '89	EMI/Universal	8 May 2025	1
Various Artists	The Greatest Showman	Atlantic	15 May 2025	2
Various Artists	Eurovision Song Contest Basel 2025	Universal	29 May 2025	2
Various Artists	Now That's What I Call the 70s	EMI/Universal	12 June 2025	1
Original Broadway Cast	Hamilton	Atlantic	19 June 2025	2
Original Soundtrack	KPop Demon Hunters	Republic	3 July 2025	22
Original Cast Recording	Wicked: For Good – The Soundtrack	Republic Records	4 December 2025	1
Original Soundtrack	KPop Demon Hunters	Republic	11 December 2025	14
2026
Various Artists	Help(2)	War Child	19 March 2026	1
Original Soundtrack	KPop Demon Hunters	Republic	26 March 2026	5
Various Artists	Now That's What I Call Music! 123	EMI/Universal	24 April 2026	1
Original Soundtrack	KPop Demon Hunters	Republic	1 May 2026	2
Various Artists	Now Yearbook '72	EMI/Universal	15 May 2026	1
Various Artists	Eurovision Song Contest: Vienna 2026	Universal	22 May 2026	1
Original Soundtrack	Paddington: The Musical	Decca	29 May 2026	1
Original Soundtrack	KPop Demon Hunters	Republic	5 June 2026	9
Various Artists	Now That's What I Call Music! 124	EMI/Universal	20 August 2026	1
Original Soundtrack	KPop Demon Hunters	Republic	27 August 2026	2
Various Artists	Now Yearbook '71	EMI/Universal	10 September 2026	1
Original Soundtrack	KPop Demon Hunters	Republic	17 September 2026	3
Various Artists	Northern Exposure Redux - Sasha/Digweed	Late Night Tales	2 October 2026	1
Original Soundtrack	KPop Demon Hunters	Republic	9 October 2026	4
Various Artists	Now Yearbook '94	EMI/Universal	6 November 2026	1
Original Cast Recording	Lloyd Webber/Phantom of the Opera-2026	The Other Songs	13 November 2026	1
