= The Family Madrigal =

Song by Stephanie Beatriz, Olga Merediz and cast of Encanto

from the album Encanto (Original Motion Picture Soundtrack)
- Released: November 19, 2021
- Genre: Vallenato
- Length: 4:17
- Label: Walt Disney
- Songwriter: Lin-Manuel Miranda
- Producers: Lin-Manuel Miranda; Mike Elizondo

Music video
- "The Family Madrigal" on YouTube

"The Family Madrigal" is a song from Disney's animated musical film Encanto (2021), released as part of the film's soundtrack on November 19, 2021, by Walt Disney Records. It was written by American singer-songwriter Lin-Manuel Miranda, and sung almost entirely by American actress Stephanie Beatriz, featuring a small refrain by American actress Olga Merediz; "The Family Madrigal" is the opening number of Encanto, and is performed by the protagonists Mirabel and Alma Madrigal, respectively, in the film.

Mirabel introduces her multigenerational Colombian family and their magical powers to the audience with the song, which has been described as an uptempo vallenato tune with a rap outro. Music critics complimented its folk instrumentation and upbeat nature. Commercially, it reached numbers 7, 18, and 20 on the UK Singles, the Irish Singles, and the US Billboard Hot 100 charts.

== Background ==
"The Family Madrigal" is a song from Disney's 2021 animated musical fantasy film, Encanto. It is the opening song of the film's soundtrack, released by Walt Disney Records on November 19, 2021. "The Family Madrigal" was written by American musician Lin-Manuel Miranda. It is mostly sung by American actress Stephanie Beatriz, who voices the film's protagonist, Mirabel Madrigal. Olga Merediz, who provides the singing voice for Mirabel's grandmother Alma "Abuela" Madrigal, appears briefly in the song.

== Lyrics and composition ==
"The Family Madrigal"
A sample of the song's opening, demonstrating the use of traditional Colombian musical instruments.

"The Family Madrigal" is a vallenato tune, driven by Colombian folk instruments such as an accordion, caja vallenata and guacharaca. Mirabel performs the song to introduce the film's core characters—the Madrigal family—and their magical "gifts" to the audience. Miranda stated the song was inspired by "Belle", the opening song in Beauty and the Beast (1991). The melody of Abuela's verse is the same as that of "Dos Oruguitas".

== Critical reception ==
Billboard writer Katie Atkinson called the song an "impossibly peppy" track. ScreenRant critic Jeremy Crabb praised its catchy melody and said it "does a good job introducing each character of the family and the abilities they possess", while the same website's Martyn Warren said "it's an energetic and fun song that is sure to be one that anyone will surely dance, or at the very least, smile along with." Drew Taylor of The Wrap wrote the song delivers "what is essentially exposition in the catchiest way possible.

== Commercial performance ==
"The Family Madrigal" has peaked at number 7 on the UK Singles Chart, and number 18 on the Irish Singles Chart, and 20 on the US Billboard Hot 100 chart.

== Charts ==
=== Weekly charts ===
Weekly chart performance for "The Family Madrigal"
Chart (2022)	Peak position
Australia (ARIA)	40
Canada (Canadian Hot 100)	31
Global 200 (Billboard)	20
Iceland (Tónlistinn)	14
Ireland (IRMA)	18
UK Singles (OCC)	7
US Billboard Hot 100	20

=== Year-end charts ===
2022 year-end chart performance for "The Family Madrigal"
Chart (2022)	Position
Global 200 (Billboard)	198
UK Singles (OCC)	77
US Streaming Songs (Billboard)	59

== Certifications ==
Certifications for "The Family Madrigal"
Region	Certification	Certified units/sales
Australia (ARIA)	Gold	35,000^{‡}
Canada (Music Canada)	Platinum	80,000^{‡}
France (SNEP) French version	Gold	100,000^{‡}
New Zealand (RMNZ)	Gold	15,000^{‡}
United Kingdom (BPI)	Platinum	600,000^{‡}
United States (RIAA)	2× Platinum	2,000,000^{‡}
^{‡} Sales+streaming figures based on certification alone.
