= Dos Oruguitas =

2021 song from animated film Encanto

Song by Sebastián Yatra

from the album Encanto (Original Motion Picture Soundtrack)
- Language: Spanish
- Released: November 19, 2021
- Genre: Folk
- Length: 3:34
- Label: Walt Disney
- Songwriter: Lin-Manuel Miranda
- Producer: Lin-Manuel Miranda

Music video
- "Dos Oruguitas" on YouTube

"Dos Oruguitas" ([dos oɾuˈɣitas]; "Two Little Caterpillars") is a Spanish-language song from Disney's 2021 animated musical feature film Encanto. Released by Walt Disney Records as part of the film's soundtrack on November 19, 2021, the song was written by American musician Lin-Manuel Miranda and performed by Colombian singer-songwriter Sebastián Yatra.

The song is played in the film over a flashback depicting the life and death of Pedro Madrigal, the grandfather of Encanto's protagonist Mirabel. The lyrics are in Spanish, but an English-language version of the song, titled "Two Oruguitas", plays over the end credits. Music critics praised the song for its sentiment, production, lyrics, and Yatra's vocal performance, and often named it as the best song from Encanto. Commercially, "Dos Oruguitas" entered the top 40 of the US Billboard Hot 100 and marked Yatra's first-ever appearance on the chart. The song was nominated for Best Original Song at the 94th Academy Awards, but lost to "No Time to Die" by Billie Eilish.

== Background and release ==
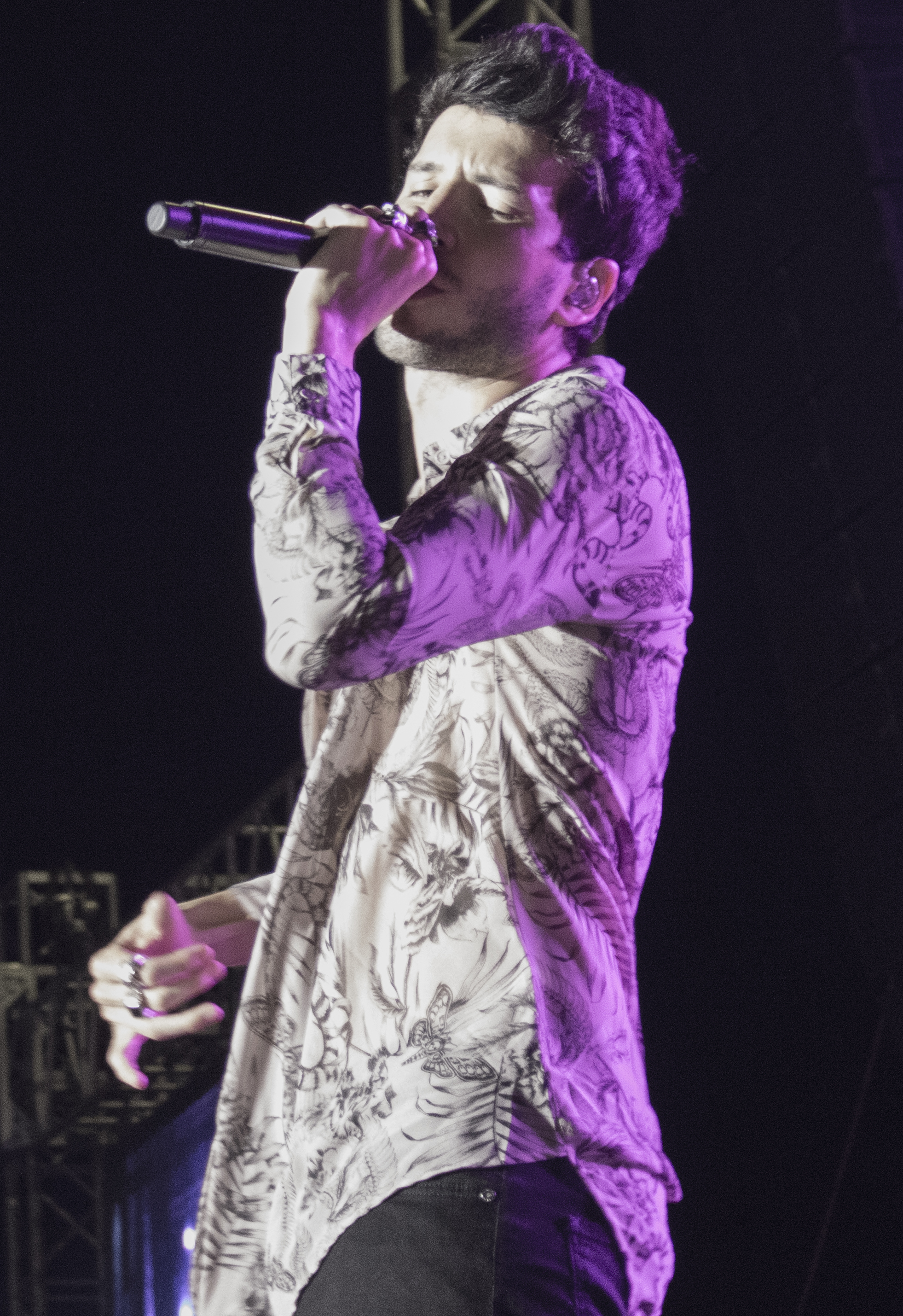
Colombian singer-songwriter Sebastián Yatra performed "Dos Oruguitas"

Encanto is an American animated musical fantasy film. The song is featured as the sixth track on the film's soundtrack. It was written and composed by American singer-songwriter Lin-Manuel Miranda, who also wrote the seven other songs of the soundtrack. He previously worked on Disney's 2016 animated film, Moana, as well. It is sung by Sebastián Yatra, who grew up in the US but was born in Colombia. He was invited to join the Encanto soundtrack and sing the song after Miranda heard Yatra's song "Adiós".

== Composition and development ==
"Dos Oruguitas"
A sample of "Dos Oruguitas", depicting the sentimental folk instrumentation and lyrics from the perspective of Pedro, the late husband of Alma "Abuela" Madrigal.

"Dos Oruguitas" was the first song Miranda wrote completely in Spanish. This amount of Spanish was far outside his comfort zone. Miranda said, "It was important to me that I write it in Spanish, rather than write it in English and translate it, because you can always feel translation". His goal was to write a Colombian folk song that "felt like it [had] always existed," which he thought would make the painful family history depicted in the accompanying animated sequence easier to watch. He was inspired in particular by composers Antônio Carlos Jobim and Joan Manuel Serrat.

The song and accompanying sequence were originally planned to be in the prologue, but the filmmaking team decided they would fit better toward the end of the film.

== Lyrics and context ==
"Dos Oruguitas" is a non-diegetic song, which plays during a flashback. In this flashback, Mirabel learns about her grandmother's Alma's past and the hardship she went through: her romance with her husband Pedro, and how Pedro's self-sacrifice when they were fleeing a war allowed Alma to escape. This story helps reconcile Mirabel and her grandmother. Co-director Byron Howard said about the song: "It's probably the most critical bit of musical storytelling in the whole film because it has to do with the history of the family and Mirabel understanding her grandmother." The song itself is about two caterpillars falling in love and having to let each other go, which is a metaphor for the events in Pedro and Alma's lives.

== Reception ==
=== Critical reviews ===
Billboard critics dubbed "We Don't Talk About Bruno" as the most memorable track from Encanto, but picked "Dos Oruguitas" as the best track for being a heartfelt ballad with "emotional resonance and beautiful sentimentality". TheWrap's Drew Taylor also ranked it as the best song, saying that even without the accompanying visuals, "the song will still make you sob, whether you know Spanish or not." /Film critic Caroline Cao ranked it as the second-best song, describing it as "an elegy that honors what's been lost, even as it emboldens the survivors to find their way forward, carrying on those memories".

=== Commercial performance ===
"Dos Oruguitas" debuted on the US Billboard Hot 100 chart at number 83, marking Yatra's first ever appearance on the chart. It eventually ascended to number 36. The song peaked at number 2 on the US Hot Latin Songs chart.

=== Accolades ===
| Award | Date of ceremony | Category | Result | Ref. |
|---|---|---|---|---|
| Academy Awards | March 27, 2022 | Best Original Song | Nominated | |
| Critics' Choice Movie Awards | March 13, 2022 | Best Song | Nominated | |
| Denver Film Critics Society Awards | January 17, 2022 | Best Original Song | Nominated | |
| Georgia Film Critics Association Awards | January 14, 2022 | Best Original Song | Nominated | |
| Gold Derby Awards | March 16, 2022 | Best Original Song | Nominated | |
| Golden Globe Awards | January 9, 2022 | Best Original Song | Nominated | |
| Guild of Music Supervisors Awards | March 20, 2022 | Best Song Written and/or Recorded for a Film | Won | |
| Houston Film Critics Society Awards | January 19, 2022 | Best Original Song | Nominated | |
| Las Vegas Film Critics Society Awards | December 13, 2021 | Best Song | Nominated | |
| Latino Entertainment Journalists Association Film Awards | March 6, 2022 | Best Song Written for a Film | Nominated | |
| North Dakota Film Society Awards | January 17, 2022 | Best Original Song | Nominated | |

== Charts ==
=== Weekly charts ===
Weekly chart performance for "Dos Oruguitas"
| Chart (2021–2022) | Peak position |
|---|---|
| Canada Hot 100 (Billboard) | 48 |
| Colombia (National-Report) | 92 |
| Ireland (IRMA) | 89 |
| Global 200 (Billboard) | 26 |
| US Billboard Hot 100 | 36 |
| US Hot Latin Songs (Billboard) | 2 |

=== Year-end charts ===
2022 year-end chart performance for "Dos Oruguitas"
| Chart (2022) | Position |
|---|---|
| Global 200 (Billboard) | 192 |

== Certifications ==
Certifications for "Dos Oruguitas"
| Region | Certification | Certified units/sales |
|---|---|---|
| Brazil (Pro-Música Brasil) | Gold | 20,000^{‡} |
| Canada (Music Canada) | Platinum | 80,000^{‡} |
| United Kingdom (BPI) | Gold | 400,000^{‡} |
| United States (RIAA) | Platinum | 1,000,000^{‡} |
^{‡} Sales+streaming figures based on certification alone.
