= Olga Merediz =

American actress and singer (born 1956)

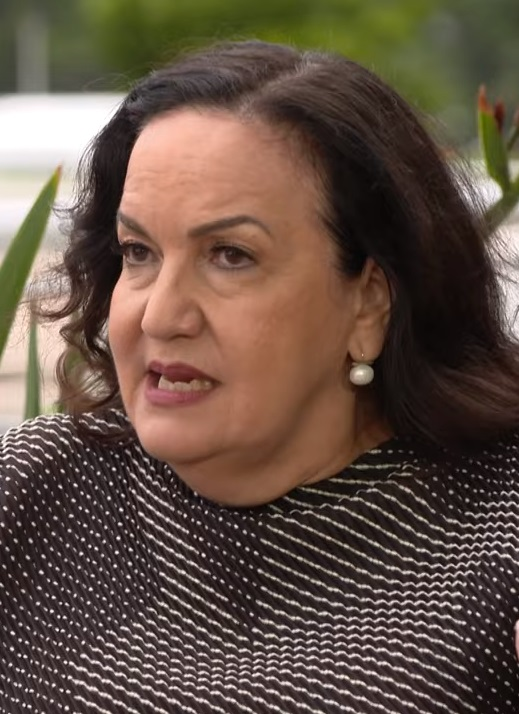
- Merediz in 2021
- Born: February 15, 1956 (age 70); Guantánamo, Cuba
- Citizenship: United States
- Education: Tulane University
- Occupations: Actress; singer
- Years active: 1984–present
- Known for: Abuela Claudia in In the Heights
- Awards: Drama Desk Award; HOLA Tespis Award

Olga Merediz (born February 15, 1956) is an American actress and singer. Merediz originated the role of Claudia in the Broadway musical In the Heights, for which she received a Tony Award nomination for Best Featured Actress in a Musical. She played the role for the show's entire Broadway run, and reprised the role in the film adaptation. Her television credits include NBC's 2016 series Shades of Blue and Netflix's Orange Is the New Black.

== Early life ==
Merediz was born in Guantánamo, Cuba on February 15, 1956. She left Cuba with her family when she was five years old to Miami, Florida. Thereafter, she relocated with her family to Puerto Rico where she grew up. Olga attended and graduated from Commonwealth High School in San Juan where she performed and began developing her singing and acting skills in the high school theatrical plays. Merediz graduated with a bachelor's degree from Newcomb College, the former women's college within Tulane University in New Orleans, Louisiana.

== Career ==
=== Film and television ===
Having made her film debut in 1984's The Brother from Another Planet, Merediz has since appeared in a number of films, including The Milagro Beanfield War (1988), City of Hope (1991), Evita (1996), Music of the Heart (1999), K-PAX (2001), Remember Me (2010), Custody (2016), Humor Me (2017), and the reprise of her 2008 Tony Award nominated Broadway role as Abuela Claudia, in the film adaptation In the Heights (2021). She also provided the singing voice of Alma Madrigal in Encanto (2021).

Her television credits, in both dramas and comedies, include recurring and guest roles in Diary of a Future President, New Amsterdam, Brooklyn Nine-Nine, Orange Is the New Black and Madam Secretary. She has been a series regular in the UK television series Bounty Hunters and the comedy Saint George, has appeared in episodes of both Law & Order and Law & Order: SVU, and appeared as herself as a judge on Throwdown with Bobby Flay.

=== Theatre ===
In addition to In the Heights, her Broadway credits include Reckless at the Manhattan Theatre Club, Man of La Mancha, and Les Misérables. She also appeared as Rosie in Mamma Mia!.

Before they went to Broadway, Merediz starred in the Off-Broadway versions of In the Heights, and The Human Comedy. Some of her other Off-Broadway credits include Women without Men, The Haggadah, Lullabye and Goodnight, and The Blessing.

Additionally, Merediz was directed by John Cassavetes in a play called Thornhill.

=== Voice-over credits ===
Merediz has an extensive voice-over and narration portfolio, including the PBS Nature documentaries: Bears, Hotel Armadillo, Jungle Animal Hospital, Nature's Miracle Orphans, and Cuba: The Accidental Eden. Her voice can be heard in numerous TV/radio commercials, Dora the Explorer, Go, Diego, Go!, Elena of Avalor, and Encanto.

Earlier in her career, she served as spokesperson for the MTA, New York City Transit Authority.

== Awards and nominations ==
At the 2008 Tony Awards, she received a nomination for Best Performance by a Featured Actress in a Musical for the Broadway incarnation of In the Heights. In addition to her Tony Award nomination, Merediz won a 2007 Drama Desk Award for Outstanding Ensemble Performance for her role in the off-Broadway run of In the Heights, as well as a 2003 HOLA Tespis Award from the Hispanic Organization of Latin Actors.

In 2013, Latina magazine named her as one of the 50 Best Latin Singers and Pop Stars of All Time. According to the magazine, "The Cuban Broadway star knows how to dominate a live stage and owns it!"

== Filmography ==
Key
†	Denotes works that have not yet been released

=== Film ===
Year	Title	Role	Notes
1984	The Brother from Another Planet	Noreen's Client	
1988	The Milagro Beanfield War	Milagro Townsperson	
1990	Q&A	Mrs. Valentin	
1991	City of Hope	Nidia	
1991	The Super	Female #2	
1992	Boomerang	Guard	
1994	Angie	Roz	
1995	Drunks	Chairwoman	
1996	Evita	Bianca Duarte	
1996	Marvin's Room	Beauty Shop Lady	
1997	States of Control	Purse-snatched Woman	
1997	White Lies	Woman #1 in Window	
1999	Things I Forgot to Remember	Carmela	
1999	Music of the Heart	Ms. Olivas	
2000	Isn't She Great	Mrs. Ramirez	
2000	Center Stage	ABA Receptionist	
2000	Requiem for a Dream	Malin & Block Secretary	
2001	K-PAX	Transit Officer	
2002	Changing Lanes	Mrs. Miller	
2002	Apartment 5C	Jenny	
2004	Imaginary Heroes	Maria	Uncredited
2006	A Guide to Recognizing Your Saints	Aunt Mary	
2010	Remember Me	Aidan's Professor	
2011	Mr. Popper's Penguins	Nanny	
2011	Trouble in the Heights	Gloria	
2012	One for the Money	Rosa Gomez	
2012	The Place Beyond the Pines	Malena Gutierrez	
2014	The Angriest Man in Brooklyn	Jane	
2014	Top Five	Chelsea's Mom	
2014	Like Sunday, Like Rain	Esa	
2014	Fugly!	Moms	
2016	Custody	Joyce	
2016	Urge	Esthetician	
2016	America Adrift	Sorida	
2017	The Light of the Moon	Mariana	
2017	Humor Me	Fortune Teller	
2019	Fair Market Value	Missy Goya	
2020	Godmothered	Beth	
2021	In the Heights	Abuela Claudia	
2021	Encanto	Abuela Alma Madrigal (singing voice)	
2023	Somebody I Used to Know	Joanne "Jojo"	
2024	Spellbound	General Cardona (voice)	
2025	Eternity	Karen	

=== Television ===
Year	Title	Role	Notes
1985	The Cosby Show	Mrs. Rodriguez	Episode: "Mr. Quiet"
1986	Another World	Dolores	1 episode
1987	Leg Work	Nuse	Episode: "Things That Go Bump in the Night"
1987–95	ABC Afterschool Special	Mrs. Mathias / Dr. Montoya	2 episodes
1988–89	Tattingers	Nanette	2 episodes
1989	Baby Cakes	Check-out Girl	TV movie
1991–2009	Law & Order	Various	6 episodes
1995	Central Park West	Anne	2 episodes
1996	The Sunshine Boys	Sue	TV movie
2000	The Sopranos	Fran	Episode: "Bust Out"
2001	The Job	Yolanda Sommeriba	Episode: "Anger"
2001	Third Watch	Judge	Episode: "He Said/She Said"
2002	George Lopez	Aunt Cecilia	Episode: "Who's Your Daddy?"
2002	Law & Order: Criminal Intent	Mrs. Martinez	Episode: "Best Defense"
2003	Hope & Faith	Gloria	3 episodes
2003–19	Dora the Explorer	Maestra Beatriz / Fairy Godmother (voice)	2 episodes
2003–25	Law & Order: Special Victims Unit	Veronica Nash / Judge Roberta Martinez	7 episodes
2004	The Jury	Leticia Schikert	2 episodes
2005	Go, Diego, Go!	Mrs. Marquez (voice)	Episode: "Diego Saves the Humpback Whale"
2009	Au Pair 3: Adventure in Paradise	Teresa	TV movie
2009	Royal Pains	Esperanza	Episode: "If I Were a Sick Man"
2010	Past Life	Carmen Santos	Episode: "Pilot"
2011	Blue Bloods	Inez	Episode: "My Funny Valentine"
2011	Pan Am	Mrs. Rodriguez	Episode: "Unscheduled Departure"
2014	Saint George	Alma Lopez	10 episodes
2014	Dora and Friends: Into the City!	Emma's Grandma / Wagnerian Woman (voice)	Episode: "Dora Saves Opera Land"
2014–19	Orange Is the New Black	Lourdes	6 episodes
2015	Alternatino	Mother	Episode: "Respect Your Mother"
2016	Madam Secretary	Rep. Elle Vazquez	Episode: "Breakout Capacity"
2016–17	Shades of Blue	Lorena Zepeda	3 episodes
2017	The Breaks		Episode: "Blind Alley"
2017	Bounty Hunters	Maria	5 episodes
2017–18	Stuck in the Middle	Abuela	2 episodes
2017–19	Brooklyn Nine-Nine	Julia Diaz	2 episodes
2018–19	New Amsterdam	Warden Gloria Salazar	2 episodes
2019	Elena of Avalor	Felicia (voice)	Episode: "Flower of Light"
2019–20	Bull	Judge Ollis	2 episodes
2020–21	Diary of a Future President	Francisca	2 episodes
2022	Blockbuster	Connie Serrano	Main role; 10 episodes

=== Stage ===
Year	Show	Role	Notes
1982	Lullabye and Goodnight	Saint	Off-Broadway
1984	The Human Comedy	Mexican Woman	Broadway
1987	Les Misérables	Female Ensemble/Madame Thénardier Understudy	Broadway (Replacement)
2001	Mamma Mia!	Rosie	Broadway (Replacement)
2002	Man of La Mancha	The Housekeeper	Broadway Revival
2004	Reckless	Trish/Woman Patient	Broadway
2008	In the Heights	Abuela Claudia	Broadway; Nominated—Tony Award for Best Featured Actress in a Musical

== Discography ==
=== Charted songs ===
List of charted songs, with year released, selected chart positions, and album name shown
Title	Year	Peak chart positions							Certifications	Album
Title	Year	US	AUS	CAN	IRE	NZ Hot	UK	WW	Certifications	Album
"The Family Madrigal" (with Stephanie Beatriz and Encanto cast)	2021	20	40	31	18	7	7	20	RIAA: Gold; ARIA: Gold; BPI: Platinum	Encanto
"All of You" (with Stephanie Beatriz, John Leguizamo, Adassa, Maluma, and Encanto cast)	2021	71	—	83	—	—	—	111	BPI: Silver	Encanto
"—" denotes songs which were not released in that country or did not chart.
