= Mirabel Madrigal =

Fictional character from Encanto

- Encanto character
- First appearance: Encanto; November 3, 2021
- Created by: Jared Bush; Byron Howard; Charise Castro Smith
- Voiced by: Stephanie Beatriz; Noemi Josefina Flores (young)
- Birthday: March 6

In-universe information
- Family: Julieta (mother); Agustín (father); Isabela (oldest sister); Luisa (older sister)
- Relatives: Alma (grandmother); Pedro (grandfather); Félix (uncle); Pepa (aunt); Bruno (uncle); Dolores (oldest cousin); Camilo (older cousin); Antonio (younger cousin)
- Nationality: Colombian

Mirabel Madrigal is a fictional character and the protagonist of the Walt Disney Animation Studios' film, Encanto (2021). Created by directors and writers Jared Bush and Byron Howard and Charise Castro Smith, Mirabel is depicted as an imperfect, quirky, emotional, and empathetic 15-year-old girl who is the only member of the Madrigal family who does not receive a magical gift. When their "miracle" begins to fade, Mirabel takes it upon herself to save the magic, learning of her familial troubles.

From the outset of the character's development, Mirabel was conceived as the only member of her family without a gift. The film's draft plot depicted her desperately searching for a gift, but the character's motivation was adjusted to a desire to be noticed, which was deemed more relatable for the audience. Mirabel's physical appearance is based on that of tourist guide Alejandra Espinosa Uribe; Mirabel's design began with her skirt, whose extensive embroidery represents her personality. American actress and singer Stephanie Beatriz provides Mirabel's voice; Beatriz first auditioned for the role of Luisa but was deemed perfect for Mirabel.

Since her debut, Mirabel received critical acclaim, with praise directed to her characterization, relatability, design, and Stephanie Beatriz's voice performance. Beatriz's performance in particular was also lauded as "terrific" and "perfectly cast". Mirabel's relationship with her family has been the subject of discussion among therapists and immigrant groups, who related to the ways in which she deals with generational trauma.

== Development ==
=== Conception ===
After finishing Zootopia (2016), directors Byron Howard and Jared Bush wanted their next project to be a musical, which became a Latin American musical after Lin-Manuel Miranda joined the project. The developers discussed their common experiences of having large extended families and decided to make a musical film about a large extended family with twelve main characters. Howard and Bush discussed Latin American culture at length with Juan Rendon and Natalie Osma, who had worked with them on the making-of documentary Imagining Zootopia. Rendon and Osma are from Colombia; they drew upon their personal experiences with Colombian culture in their discussions, which caused Howard, Bush, and Miranda to focus their research on that country. Rendon and Osma became the first of several cultural experts hired by Disney Animation as consultants on the film, forming what Disney called the "Colombian Cultural Trust".

The Encanto production team had finalized the basic idea of a girl who is the only member of her family without a supernatural gift. When the group began developing the characters, they realized the vulnerability of Mirabel's situation. Mirabel's lack of powers quickly established her as the ideal plot device, as well as a character with whom audiences could sympathize. The reason behind her lack of powers is deliberately not explained in the film. Bush and Howard said that as a magic realism film, Encanto is meant to "function just as well as a story" in the absence of magic. As a result, Mirabel saves her family by resolving tensions rather than by using magic. The directors challenged the animators to make Mirabel distinctive from prior Disney female heroes; she had to be both capable and imperfect but not merely clumsy.

Mirabel's original name was Beatriz, which was changed two years before casting her voice actor Stephanie Beatriz. The character's name originated from the word Mira, which means look in Spanish. According to Bush; "in the early days we always question if we have the right names – 'miracle' etymology and rhyme with Mirabel reinforced it". The character's name is also a Latin word that means wonderful, which represents her curiosity.

As Encanto's story evolved, the writers and story artists considered Mirabel's motives and imperfections. The film's draft plot depicted her desperately searching for a gift, but the crew realized she would have grown past this. Bush stated that her hope to be noticed, rather than an adventure for a magical gift, felt considerably more relatable. The plot and family connections were eventually written around this motive. One version of the film featured Mirabel narrating until the start of the third act, in which Abuela Alma's point of view would be shown; this concept was scrapped because it was regarded as too distracting.

=== Voice ===
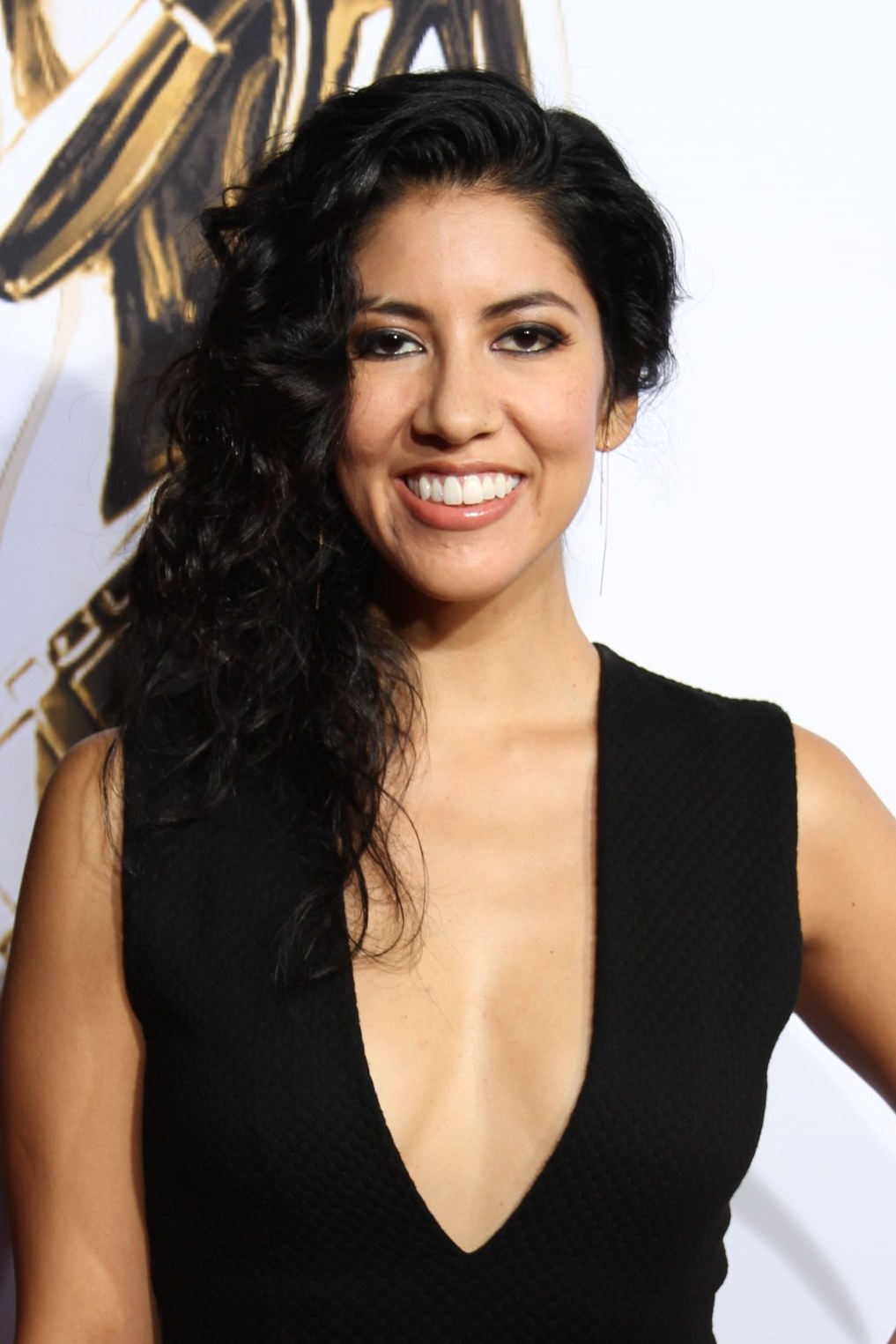
Stephanie Beatriz, the voice of Mirabel

Beatriz initially auditioned for Luisa, but when they heard her read, the production crew decided she was perfect for Mirabel. According to Smith, Beatriz secured the part because of her personality, humor, and distinctive voice. During her audition for Mirabel, Beatriz sang "You're Welcome" from Moana and performed a scene in which Mirabel comforts Antonio before he receives his gift.

The directors wanted to let the actors explore their roles and to feel at ease "messing around and improvising in the moment". Beatriz initially believed Mirabel should sound young, so she voiced her with a high pitch. Howard and Bush, however, insisted on making her sound more mature; they considered she had to take care of herself most of the time because her family is full of "stars". According to Beatriz, Mirabel must manage her own needs, requiring a certain amount of maturity. Beatriz said finding time to breathe while singing was the most challenging part of voicing Mirabel; "You got to literally plan out 'Okay. On this eighth note or whatever I've got to ... ' So that I'm ready for the next big chunk of it." When recording Mirabel's "I Want" song "Waiting on a Miracle", Beatriz was nine months pregnant; she worked with a vocal coach to learn proper breathing techniques and ensure she was properly supporting herself. Much of her voice work was recorded during the COVID-19 pandemic. Sometimes, she acted with only Miranda or the directors, but on some occasions, many other crew members would listen to her. As she recorded for Mirabel, Beatriz received many sketches, which she described as "really special" because the character bore a resemblance to herself at the same age. For "What Else Can I Do?", Beatriz watched the sequence's initial animation, which she credited for her finding a way to "weave [her] way through the song using [her] voice".

=== Design ===
While researching the film in Barichara, Howard and Bush befriended Alejandra Espinosa Uribe, a local tour guide who showed them around the town, later hiring her to consult on the film's historical and cultural authenticity. Espinosa Uribe influenced several aspects of Mirabel's characteristics, including her curly, black hair, large eyeglasses, and gestures. Velasquez and the film's character technical director Xinmin Zhao looked for real-life references across "the whole studio" for Mirabel's hair and were inspired by Castro Smith's curls. The animators took inspiration from Beatriz's characteristics and mannerisms to make Mirabel as distinct as possible. Mirabel's clothes are intended to look handmade. As a unique member of her family, Mirabel lacks a color palette that connects her to Casita, so her outfit incorporates most of her family's colors.

Because Encanto is set in the Andean region, its traditional fashions were an important inspiration for the film's costumes. During the late 19th and early 20th centuries, women from the region usually dressed in white tops with needlework, long skirts, and matching petticoats. They would also wear alpargatas (traditional Colombian shoes) created from fique. Design work was not linear; Disney artists repeatedly moved between different stages to iteratively improve the character. For example, the modelers sent the production team a work-in-progress model after building a first iteration based on visual development artists' drawings of Mirabel. The artists would make draw-overs to give feedback to the modelers, adding to her anatomy and design. Initial designs depicted Mirabel in an oversized coat, an idea the production crew explored for some time. Earlier versions of Mirabel's body shape were more stylized than later ones. When Abuela Alma's body was revised to a more naturalistic shape, Mirabel's body was also revised in the same way, which meant the shape of Mirabel's neckline more closely resembled human anatomy.

Mirabel's design began with her skirt, which is inspired by those from the Vélez area as well as traditional Colombian ones in general. The skirt was decorated with embroidery that is intended to look imperfect and handcrafted. Look-development artist Jose Luis "Weecho" Velasquez "virtually stitched all the embroidery by hand" on a computer to build the texture of Mirabel's skirt. Disney artists designed symbols for the skirt to represent each member of her family and her affection for them. These symbols include a candle for Alma, animals for Antonio, flowers for Isabela, a sun for Pepa, and a chameleon for Camilo. According to Screen Rant, the incorporation of her family's gifts on her skirt displays her Madrigal pride and indicates her character, her lack of resentment and envy of her family, and her active support for them and their gifts. Mirabel's full name, and an image of her own face wearing her glasses, are sewn into the skirt to show she lacks a gift. "Loud" aspects, such as pink tassels, are used to represent Mirabel's desire to be noticed. According to associate production designer Lorelay Bové, Mirabel's skirt is similar to "a 15-year-old girl's scrapbook". Mirabel's shirt has a butterfly pattern that references the Madrigal family. In accordance with the film's theme of significant changes, butterfly designs, including one on the candle, are seen throughout Casita.

Mirabel is the first Disney female hero to wear glasses. They are a significant part of her appearance. A primary theme of the film, according to Bové, is perspective; Mirabel's glasses are a deliberate choice to highlight that concept. Mirabel embarks on an adventure to see her family anew and other people's true characters; according to Bush: "we gave her glasses on purpose because it was a part of her journey[,] and we wanted it to be baked into her character". She also wears them because part of her name comes from the Spanish word Mira. The glasses are green as a reference to Bruno, her uncle, who wears green clothing.

== Appearances ==
=== Encanto ===
At age five, Mirabel is seemingly denied a gift (Note: Gifted to the Madrigal family after Pedro Madrigal sacrificed himself to save his wife and children. At age five, Madrigal descendants are gifted a magical power that they use to serve their village.) from her family's miracle. From this point onward, everyone's expectations of her change, and everyone, including Mirabel herself, sees her differently. Ten years later, she is accidentally excluded from a family picture and feels she is not truly a part of the Madrigal family. Because she wishes to have a gift, Mirabel notices Casita cracking and the candle (Note: The candle is from Alma and Pedro's wedding. When they are forced by an armed conflict to flee their village in Colombia, Pedro takes the candle but dies. By a miracle, the candle attains magical qualities. This includes being able to never go out, blasting away the pursuers, and creating a sentient house, Casita, for them to live in, along with a magical realm bordered by tall surrounding mountains—an encanto. Fifty years later, the candle continues to burn, and a town thrives under its protection.) flickering, which Alma, her abuela, says would never happen. Mirabel warns everyone, but the cracks disappear, and no one believes her. Mirabel hears Alma questioning whether the miracle is dying, and she takes it upon herself to save it.

Luisa, Mirabel's older sister, suggests Mirabel search her missing uncle Bruno's room for a clue because of a rumor that he had a vision about the magic. Mirabel finds the vision and sees herself surrounded by a cracked Casita, implying she might be the cause of the miracle's dying. Dolores later reveals the secret to everyone. Mirabel finds Bruno hiding inside the house's walls and questions him about his vision; Bruno says he only knows the fate of the Madrigal family will depend on her. When Bruno makes another vision, Mirabel sees a butterfly and herself hugging someone, whom she and Bruno identify as Isabela, her eldest sister. Annoyed due to Isabela's entitled personality, Mirabel insincerely asks her for a hug, which she refuses. Isabela inadvertently reveals that she struggles with the constant pressure to be perfect. Mirabel persuades Isabela to become truer to herself, and they reconcile, partially healing the cracks near the candle. Alma sees them and accuses Mirabel of trying to hurt the family out of spite for lacking a gift. Despondent with this treatment, Mirabel realizes that she and the rest of the family will never be good enough for Alma, and saying that the miracle is dying because of her. The house breaks and collapses as a result of their heated argument. Mirabel tries to save the candle, but it extinguishes in her hands. Distraught and heartbroken, Mirabel runs away from home.

The next day, Alma finds Mirabel at the river and apologizes for her accusation and high expectations for their family. Mirabel and Alma reconcile, and return to a broken Casita; Mirabel tells her family they are more than their gifts, while Alma apologizes for seeing her family's powers as the miracle instead of their existence. The family, with the townspeople, rebuild Casita. The Madrigals make a doorknob bearing an "M" for Mirabel to place into the front door, causing Casita to be restored, and the family regains their powers. Later, the family takes a group photograph, this time with Mirabel at the center of her family.

=== Merchandise ===
In December 2021, Disney released the Mirabel Singing Doll, which sings "The Family Madrigal" from the film, on shopDisney. A separate doll sold by Jakks Pacific says more than 15 "Encanto-inspired" phrases. Funko Pop released a set of four-inch (10 cm) vinyl figurines of Madrigal family members, including Mirabel, in January 2022.

=== Video games ===
Mirabel was added to Disney Dreamlight Valley in a February 2023 update as one of the "villagers" of the titular Dreamlight Valley. She also appears as a playable character in the world building game Disney Magic Kingdoms.

=== Disney parks ===
From November 2021, Mirabel started making appearances for meet and greets in the Adventureland areas of Disney parks. In April 2022, the Madrigal family and the song "We Don't Talk About Bruno" were incorporated into the "It's a Small World" attraction through numerous projections. As of April 5, 2022, early ideas for the Main Street Electrical Parade's 14 grand finale stories included Mirabel and Antonio.

== Reception ==
=== Critical response ===
Mirabel has been praised by film critics. According to Screen Daily, Mirabel radiates warmth in caring for her younger relatives and acting as the family's emotional glue. San Francisco Chronicle's G. Allen Johnson considered her one of Disney's most appealing works, possessing "the greatest superpower" of all. For Denver Post, John Wenzel stated that Mirabel, as well as Moana (2016) and Raya and the Last Dragon (2021)'s titular characters, signified more independent Disney heroines. Kristen Lopez of IndieWire found it impossible to find Mirabel unrelatable in a family where one might be perceived as non-standard; CinemaBlend's Dirk Libbey agreed, calling Mirabel Disney's most relatable character to date. Brian Truitt, writing for USA Today, singled out her awkwardness, humor, and heart, commenting that these elements made her "quite [an] enjoyable character to watch on a journey of identity and acceptance". Jonathan Sim of ComingSoon.net gave particular praise to Mirabel's distinctiveness, charisma, quirkiness, and weirdness.

"Much of the credit for the sunniness of Encanto goes to Stephanie Beatriz, who supplies Mirabel's voice. [Her comedic skills from her work as Rosa Diaz on Brooklyn Nine-Nine are] put ... to dandy use here, with quirky line readings and a playful wit that's biting but never mean. Her Mirabel is so self-effacing and funny that it's easy to root for her."

— Chris Hewitt, Star Tribune critic

Critics have found Beatriz's voice work for the character magnificent, terrific, perfectly cast, spectacular, excellent, spirited, and exceptional. IGN said Beatriz "brings just the right amount of charm and sincerity to the non-magical teenager". Bleeding Cool critic Kaitlyn Booth thought Mirabel's sadness and frustration were well expressed within her performance.

=== Impact ===
Since its release, Encanto has been discussed among therapists. Mirabel has been interpreted as the "[t]he healer trying to keep her family whole". Immigrants stated they identify with her since they are "born into this duality, and ... not seen in one, and ... not seen in the other" after their parents come to another country to escape war and violence. Other clients relate to Mirabel's hopes for acknowledgment from her elders expressed during "Waiting on a Miracle". Psychology Today stated that despite attempting to use "positive self-talk" at the start of the film, Mirabel's sense of self-worth and belonging is harmed by her lack of powers. The website interpreted Alma's later understanding that Mirabel's existence is a gift as a message of self-appreciation. On the topic of family dynamics, therapist and YouTuber Steph Anya stated that since her viewpoint is different from her family's, Mirabel is blamed for all the problems that occur, and because she lacks a gift, she can see the Madrigals' suffering and "starts the family's healing journey".

According to USA Today, many Latino millennials wanting to end generational trauma hope to do what Mirabel does: confronting the problem's source and the person who is causing pain. Polygon writer José María Luna drew comparisons between the people of Colombia and Mirabel, stating: "We're a country of Mirabels, all struggling to figure out how to fix these evils that seem like our birthright." Marcela Rodriguez-Campo, a Colombian academic, believed that casting Mirabel, a non-white, mestiza heroine, as the primary character was a crucial decision. However, Camilo Garzón expressed concern that when a non-white figure is inspirational, there is a risk that the character may become representative of a whole culture, as was the case with Moana and Coco (2017).

=== Accolades ===
Mirabel won Best Animated Female at the 2022 Alliance of Women Film Journalists Awards and 2021 Women Film Critics Circle Awards, in addition to the Visual Effects Society Award for Outstanding Animated Character in an Animated Feature. Stephanie Beatriz has also received several nominations for her voice performance, including the Annie Award for Outstanding Achievement for Voice Acting in a Feature Production.
