= Isabela Madrigal =

Fictional character from animated film Encanto

- Encanto character
- First appearance: Encanto; November 3, 2021
- Created by: Jared Bush; Byron Howard
- Based on: Golden child archetype
- Voiced by: Diane Guerrero

In-universe information
- Family: Julieta (mother); Agustín (father); Mirabel (sister); Luisa (sister)
- Relatives: Abuela Alma (grandmother); Pedro (grandfather); Félix (uncle); Pepa (aunt); Bruno (uncle); Dolores (cousin); Camilo (cousin); Antonio (cousin)
- Nationality: Colombian

Isabela Madrigal is a fictional character who appears in Walt Disney Animation Studios' animated film Encanto (2021). Isabela is depicted as seemingly perfect but privileged, possessing the ability to make flowers grow. However, Mirabel—her youngest sister—discovers that she struggles under the expectations of perfection. With Mirabel's help, she realizes her imperfections and begins growing plants other than flowers.

Directors Byron Howard and Jared Bush based the character upon the family archetype of the golden child, which resulted in her being written as the eldest Madrigal grandchild. Her gift originated from a request from a consultant for Encanto to prominently feature nature and the popularity of Colombian flowers, while her dress is influenced by the country's flower festivals. Actress Diane Guerrero, who stated she somewhat personifies the character, provides Isabela's voice.

The character and her message on the limitedness of perfectionism have been discussed among therapists.

== Development ==
=== Conception ===
After finishing Zootopia (2016), directors Byron Howard and Jared Bush knew they wanted their next project to be a musical—which turned into a Latin American musical after songwriter Lin-Manuel Miranda came on board. Howard and Bush had already worked on buddy films "where two characters go out into the world and learn about each other" and wanted to try something "completely different." They and Miranda discussed their common experience of having large extended families, and decided to make a musical film about a large extended family with a dozen main characters. Early on, they made "three important discoveries" about families which became the basis of the film's story: "1) most of us don't feel truly seen by our families, 2) most of us carry burdens we never let our families see, and 3) most of us are oblivious that nearly all of us, especially within our own families, feel the exact same way". Howard and Bush started to discuss Latin American culture at length with Juan Rendon and Natalie Osma, who had previously worked with them on the making-of documentary Imagining Zootopia. Rendon and Osma both happened to be from Colombia and repeatedly drew upon their personal experiences with Colombian culture in their discussions, which caused Howard, Bush, and Miranda to focus their research on that country. Rendon and Osma became the first two of several cultural experts hired by Disney Animation as consultants on the film, who collectively formed what Disney called the "Colombian Cultural Trust."

The characters and gifts of Encanto were built upon family archetypes; Isabela represents that of the golden child. According to Bush, the archetypes made the gifts feel more reasonable, being prescribed by emotions and personality. After attaching the archetypes, the directors incorporated "very relatable family dynamics, and then made them magical and big and beautiful and visually stunning". Isabela was written as the eldest Madrigal grandchild and therefore pressured to be perfect. Her conflict with Mirabel, according to the directors, was an excellent opportunity to depict the latter as a more complete character. Howard said that although the two love each other, they do not understand one another, resulting in a large amount of tension that eventually becomes extremely freeing for both of them.

Isabela's gift originated from consultant Alejandra Espinosa's request for nature to be a central element, since Colombians considered it to be a significant source of pride. Though Antonio's gift, the ability to communicate with animals, was inspired by this request, story artist Samantha Vilfort opted to give Isabela floral abilities due to the popularity of Colombian plants. An early concept for her gift was the ability to bring plants to life. Additionally, a version of the script featured Isabela with a "very different" romantic storyline. She was involved with Bubo, a quirky fish out of water from the city. Screen Rant stated that this storyline would change Isabela's character arc significantly: "The inclusion of Bubo would shift more attention to her romance rather than her internal struggle, perhaps making her arc less personal than what the final cut established." Ultimately, the production team decided a man would not define Isabela's journey. In lieu, she is "her own woman, still finding herself".

=== Voice ===
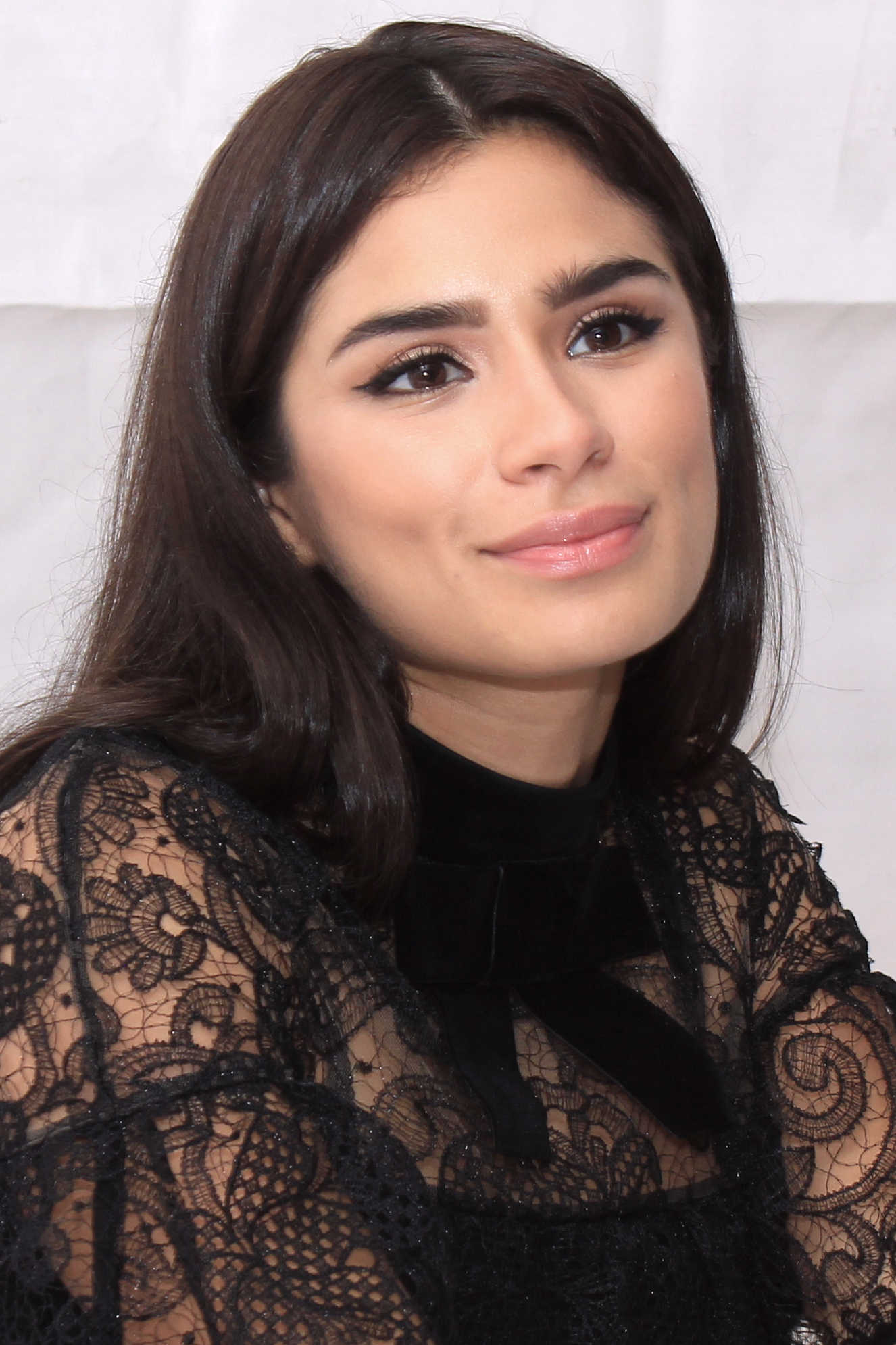
Colombian-American actress Diane Guerrero voices Isabela.

Isabela, according to Howard, is a difficult role to voice. She had to be both amusing and charming, and the ideal Madrigal; however, she also had to be Mirabel's major family adversary. Colombian-American actress Diane Guerrero instantly understood the reason she was cast in the role; she said she somewhat personifies the character. Guerrero grew up watching Disney films and princesses. As a child, she "lived" in the magical fantasy world of Disney. Guerrero yearned to be a princess, but she had no idea what it genuinely meant to be one.

=== Design ===
Isabela's character design corresponds to her motions and denotes her floral abilities. Her dress's flowery design was influenced by those worn by women doing Bambuco dance. Neysa Bové, the costume design lead on Encanto, consulted a botanist for inspiration on her dress. Flower festivals in Colombia, particularly those in Medellín, were another source of inspiration for Isabela's outfit and space. Her dress depicts several types of Colombian flowers that signify her gift, such as dahlias, hydrangeas, and daisies. Orchids—Colombia's national flower—appear in her hair and the embroidery on her neckline. After the song "What Else Can I Do?", Isabela's dress is altered. Several different designs were explored for the change; the ultimate iteration depicts bolder colors and flowers mentioned during the song.

Isabela's mannerisms are always "perfect", in contrast to the way Mirabel moves. Renato Dos Anjos, Encanto's head of animation, noted the crew always wanted Isabela to look graceful from every angle, even if she was not the primary character in the shot; she is aware she is "always on stage". Unlike the rest of her family, Isabela's dress does not feature asymmetry, owing to her perfection. Disney incorporated "this subtle undercurrent" of simultaneous anxiety into Isabela, despite her physical appearance as the golden child. Isabela also bears much resemblance to Alma, including a nearly identical face; Screen Rant speculated these physical similarities induced trauma in Alma and were the reason she pressured Isabela to be perfect.

== Appearances ==
=== Encanto ===
Isabela Madrigal is Luisa and Mirabel's eldest sister, gifted with the ability to grow flowers. Due to this, her family often see her as perfect, especially Abuela Alma. Mirabel is often annoyed at Isabela's entitled personality. She is scheduled to be engaged to their neighbor Mariano Guzmán, who Alma deems a perfect match. On the night, however, Mirabel ruins the proposal by accidentally revealing a lost prophecy by their missing uncle Bruno, which everyone believes means Mirabel will destroy the family's miracle. Isabela is angered at this and chastises Mirabel; the latter, through a new prophecy by Bruno, believes she must hug the former to save the family's miracle. Mirabel insincerely asks Isabela for a hug, to which she refuses. However, as Isabela tries to force her to leave for her sarcastic apology, Mirabel complains about Isabela's supposed selfishness and entitledness. This prompts Isabela to complain about the constant expectation of perfection on her; how Mirabel only sabotages her attempts to conform with it; and that she never wanted to marry Mariano and was only doing so for her family. As she expresses these revelations, a cactus appears. Prompted by this unexpected plant, Isabela wonders what else she can grow and wishes people did not expect perfection from her. Finally understanding her sister, Mirabel assists Isabela in becoming more imperfect, and the two grow more flawed but beautiful plants. As they both stand right by the candle, they share a hug, fulfilling Bruno's vision. However, Alma sees them and accuses of Mirabel of hurting the family just because she was not given a gift. Mirabel then realizes that no matter how hard Isabela—as well as the rest of the family—tries, she will not be perfect enough for their grandmother. As Mirabel and Alma fight, their house, Casita, falls apart, and the family lose their gifts. After Mirabel and Alma reconcile, the family and the townspeople rebuild Casita. The Madrigals make a doorknob to complete the house. When it is put into the front door, the magic returns. Isabela gives herself a new look and continues to grow flawed plants, no longer burdened by expectations of perfection.

=== Merchandise ===
Isabela is featured in several Encanto figurine sets. Disney based much of merchandise upon her, including a Lego set titled "Isabela's Magical Door", which depicts her room; a garden room play set; the "Disney Isabela Core Fashion Dress"; a hair play doll; makeup; and jewelry. /Film expressed disappointment in the abundance of Isabela-related merch and lack of individual toys based on the other members of the family—except for Mirabel. As she is considered the beautiful and perfect sister, the website stated this reinforces the idea that beauty is the principal marketing tool for young girls.

=== Video games ===
Isabela appears as a playable character in the world building game Disney Magic Kingdoms, being a character to unlock for a limited time.

== Reception ==
ABS-CBN said that Isabela's "power ... make[s] for a visual spectacle ... with her colorful arrays of flowers". IGN gave praise to Guerrero's performance: "[Co-star Jessica] Darrow and Guerrero as Luisa and Isabela both get particular moments to shine during solo songs that not only light up the screen, but deftly show the hidden complexities these characters carry with them." Screen Rant and Comic Book Resources both ranked Isabela as the seventh most likeable character in Encanto.

Therapists have associated Isabela as with the "perfectionist who feels she can't fail". Her message, about the limitedness of perfectionism, has been considered relatable for many immigrants' children. Psychology Today said: "Isabela's healing demonstrates the link between authenticity, spontaneity, and joy".
