= Muna discography =

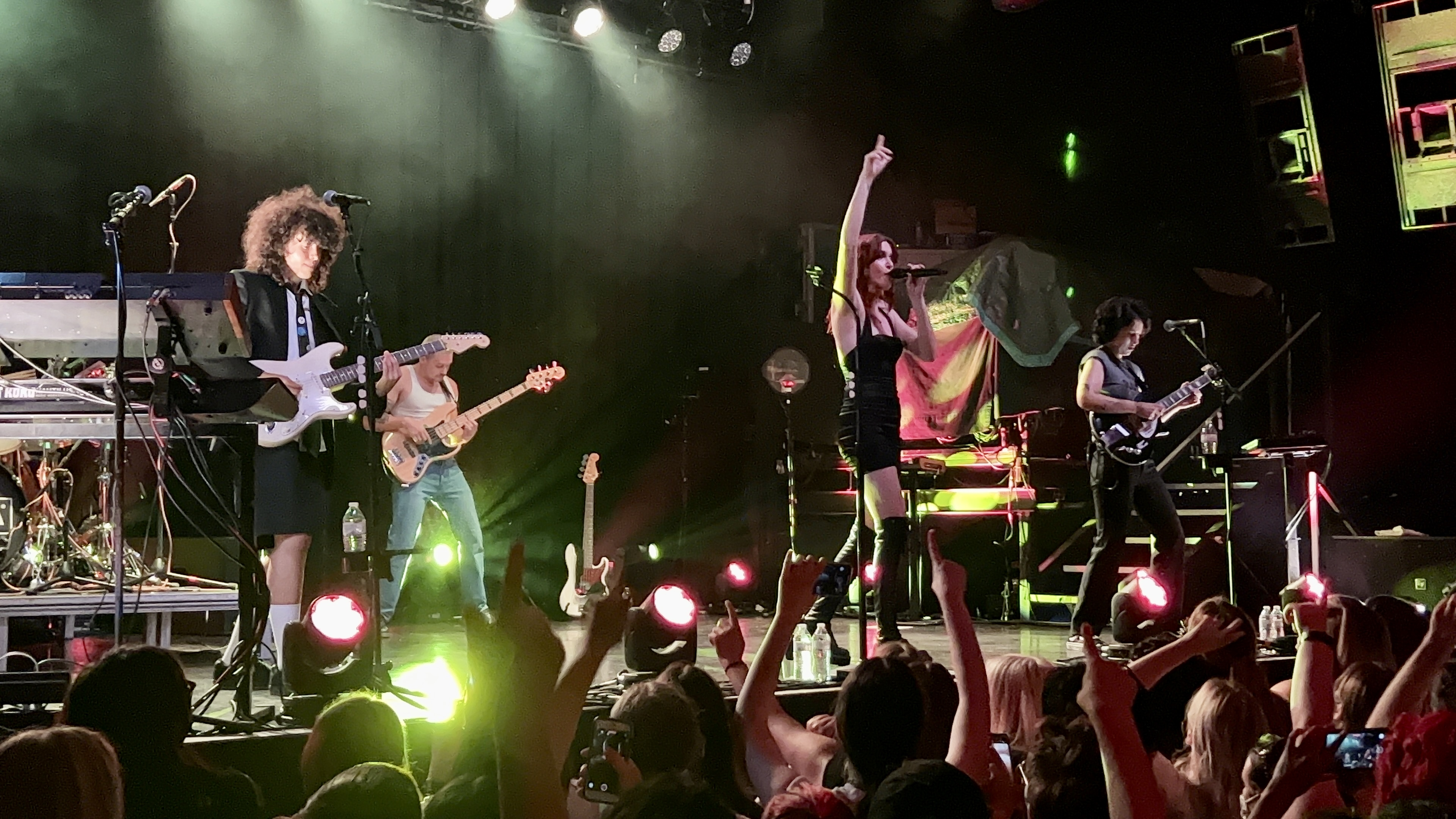
- MUNA performing in Minneapolis, 2022
- Studio albums: 4
- EPs: 6
- Singles: 19
- Music videos: 12

The discography of American indie pop band Muna comprises four studio albums, six extended plays, nineteen singles, and fifteen music video. The trio released two studio albums with RCA Records, About U (2017) and Saves the World (2019), before signing with independent label Saddest Factory Records. Their self-titled third studio album was released on June 24, 2022.

== Studio albums ==
List of studio albums, with selected details and chart positions
Title	Details	Peak chart positions							
Title	Details	US	US Alt.	US Heat.	US Indie	AUS Hit.	SCO	UK	UK Indie
About U	Released: February 3, 2017; Label: RCA; Formats: LP, CD, cassette, digital download, streaming	—	—	7	—	—	—	—	—
Saves the World	Released: September 6, 2019; Label: RCA; Formats: LP, digital download, streaming	—	—	7	—	—	33	—	—
Muna	Released: June 24, 2022; Label: Saddest Factory, Dead Oceans; Formats: LP, CD, digital download, streaming	188	21	2	26	5	10	61	4
Dancing on the Wall	Released: May 8, 2026; Label: Saddest Factory, Dead Oceans	160	25	—	23	—	7	64	7

== Extended plays ==
List of extended plays, with selected details
Title	Details
More Perfect	Released: 2014; Label: Self-released; Formats: Digital download
Loudspeaker	Released: May 6, 2016; Label: RCA; Formats: CD, digital download, streaming
Spotify Sessions	Released: October 14, 2016; Label: RCA; Formats: Streaming
About U: One Year On	Released: March 9, 2018; Label: RCA; Formats: Digital download, streaming
Spotify Singles	Released: November 14, 2019; Label: RCA; Formats: Streaming
Live at Electric Lady	Released: October 12, 2022; Label: Saddest Factory, Dead Oceans; Formats: Streaming

== Singles ==
List of singles, with selected chart positions
Title	Year	Peak chart positions				Album
Title	Year	US AAA	US Adult Pop	US Alt	US Rock	Album
"Winterbreak"	2016	—	—	—	31	About U
"Loudspeaker"	2016	—	—	—	—	About U
"I Know a Place"	2016	—	39	—	—	About U
"Crying on the Bathroom Floor"	2017	—	—	—	—	About U
"If U Love Me Now"	2017	—	—	—	—	About U
"In My Way"	2017	—	—	—	—	Non-album single
"Number One Fan"	2019	—	—	—	—	Saves the World
"Who"	2019	—	—	—	—	Saves the World
"Stayaway"	2019	—	—	—	—	Saves the World
"Taken"	2019	—	—	—	—	Saves the World
"Bodies" (with The Knocks)	2020	—	—	—	—	History
"Silk Chiffon" (featuring Phoebe Bridgers)	2021	33	35	35	45	Muna
"Anything But Me"	2022	34	—	—	—	Muna
"Kind of Girl"	2022	—	—	—	—	Muna
"Home by Now"	2022	—	—	—	—	Muna
"Sometimes" (from Fire Island)	2022	—	—	—	—	Non-album single
"What I Want"	2022	—	—	—	—	Muna
"One That Got Away"	2023	—	—	—	—	Non-album single
"Into Your Room" (with Holly Humberstone)	2023	—	—	—	—	Paint My Bedroom Black
"What's Love" (with Empress Of)	2024	—	—	—	—	For Your Consideration
"Dancing on the Wall"	2026	—	—	—	—	Dancing on the Wall
"So What"	2026	—	—	—	—	Dancing on the Wall
"Wannabeher"	2026	—	—	—	—	Dancing on the Wall

== Promotional singles ==
List of promotional singles
Title	Year	Album
"Big Stick"	2026	Dancing on the Wall

== Other charted songs ==
List of other charted songs, with selected chart positions
Title	Year	Peak chart positions	Album
Title	Year	NZ Hot	Album
"Eastside Girls"	2026	33	Dancing on the Wall

== Remixes ==
List of remixes
Title	Year	Artist
"Company"	2016	Tinashe
"Good Morning"	2017	Grouplove
"Bon Appétit"	2017	Katy Perry
"Bite"	2018	Fickle Friends
"Peach"	2018	Broods
"Sunflower"	2020	Dizzy
"With Myself"	2020	Winona Oak
"Visitor"	2020	Of Monsters and Men
"Set It Free"	2020	Now, Now
"Man's World"	2020	Marina
"Ablaze"	2020	Alanis Morissette
"Girls Like Us"	2021	Zoe Wees
"Empathy"	2021	Lauren Aquilina
"Seeing Things"	2021	Charlie Hickey

== Guest appearances ==
List of guest appearances by Muna
Title	Year	Other Artist(s)	Album
"Relief Next to Me"	2017	Tegan and Sara	Tegan and Sara Present the Con X: Covers
"Pipes of Peace"	2017	—N/a	Holidays Rule (Vol. 2)
"Judas Kiss"	2020	Lawrence Rothman	The Turning
"Nihilist"	2020	—N/a	Promising Young Woman
"Bad At Letting Go"	2023	Leland	Non-album single
"Morning Pages"	2023	The Japanese House	In the End It Always Does
"Into Your Room (Remix)"	2023	Holly Humberstone	Into Your Room
"Cry In the Car"	2025	Maren Morris	Dreamsicle
"Let Me See Ya"	2026	Big Freedia, Sophie	Released at Last

== Music videos ==
List of music videos
Title	Year	Director
"Winterbreak"	2016	
"Loudspeaker"	2016	Zaiba Jabbar
"I Know a Place"	2017	Tabitha Denholm
"In My Way"	2017	
"Number One Fan"	2019	
"Stayaway"	2019	Minnie Schedeen
"Taken"	2019	Minnie Schedeen
"Silk Chiffon"	2021	Ally Pankiw
"Anything But Me"	2022	Ally Pankiw
"Kind of Girl"	2022	Taylor James
"What I Want"	2022	Ally Pankiw & Taylor James
"One That Got Away"	2023	Ally Pankiw & Taylor James
