= Nova Twins =

British rock duo

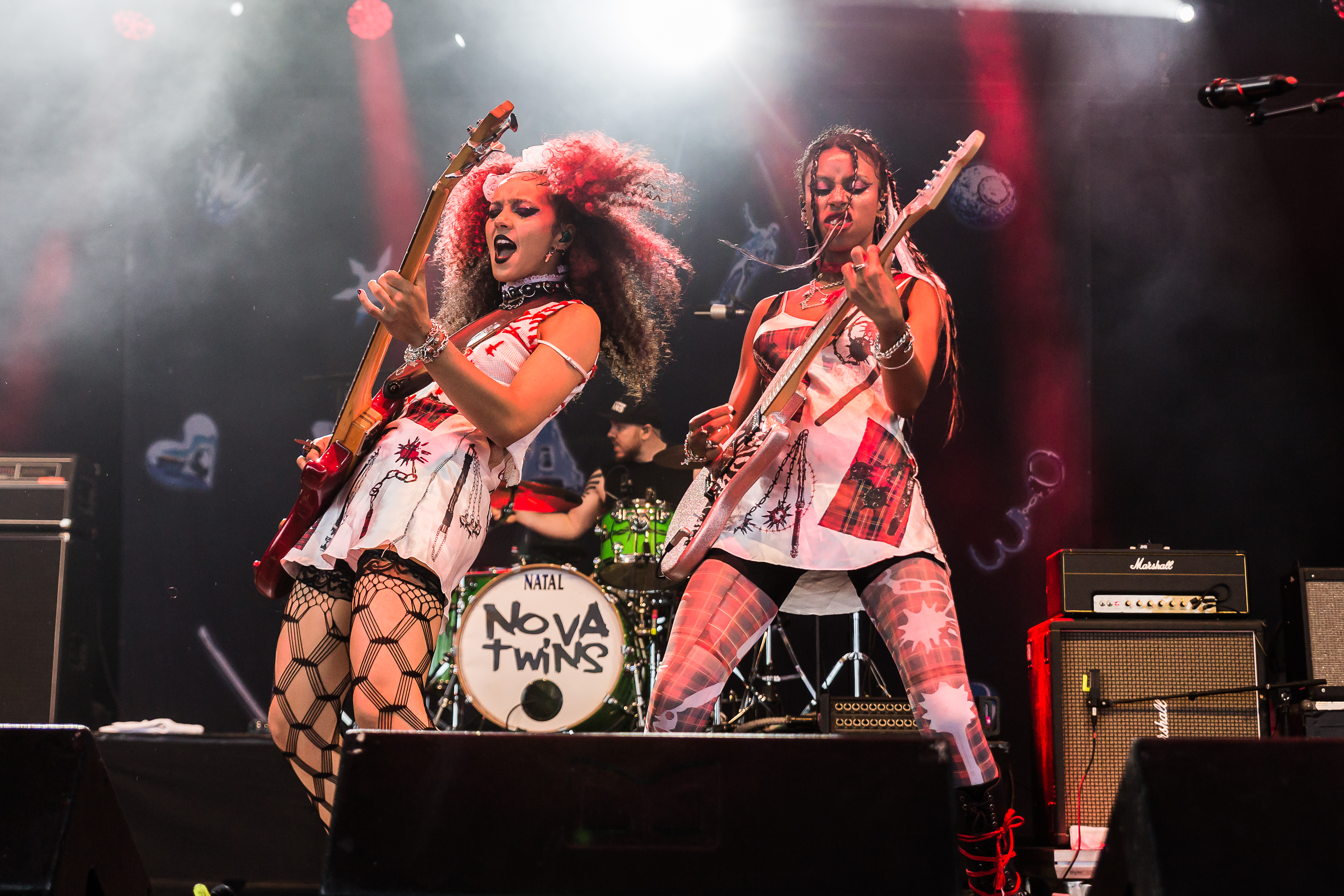
- Nova Twins at the Full Force in Germany in 2023 (L–R: Georgia South, Amy Love)

Background information
- Origin: London, England
- Genres: Rap rock, alternative rock
- Years active: 2014–present
- Labels: Marshall; 333 Wreckords Crew
- Members: Amy Love; Georgia South
- Website: novatwins.co.uk

Nova Twins are a British rock duo formed in London, England, in 2014, consisting of vocalist/guitarist Amy Love and bassist Georgia South. Their debut album, Who Are the Girls?, was released in February 2020. Their second album Supernova, was released in June 2022. Supernova was shortlisted for the 2022 Mercury Prize and led to the band receiving two nominations at the BRIT Awards in 2023. Their most recent album, Parasites & Butterflies, was released on August 29th 2025.

== Career ==
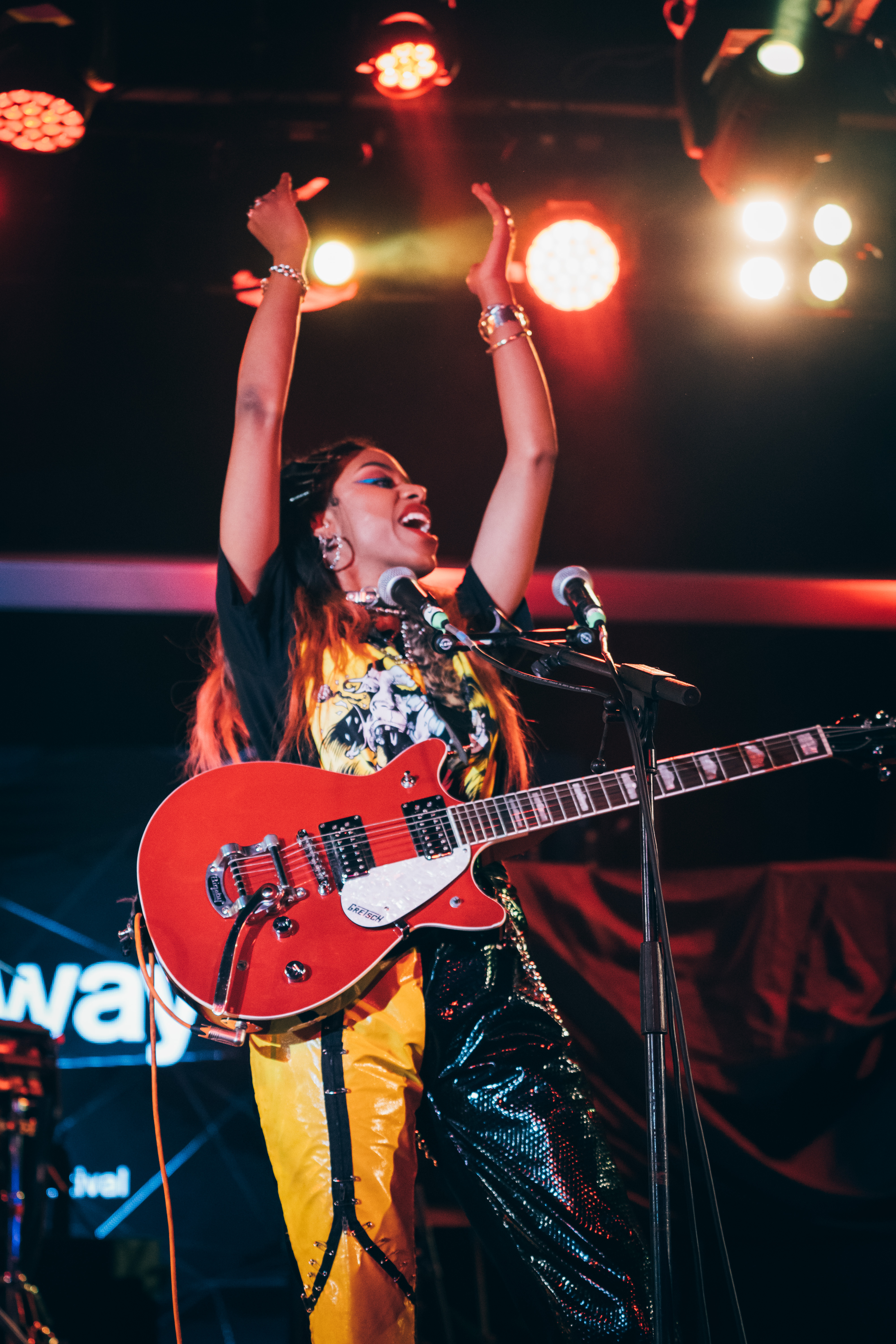
Nova Twins singer/guitarist Amy Love

Love and South have been close friends since childhood and have played in bands that were often booked on the same bill. Both of them come from a mixed background; Love is of Iranian and Nigerian descent, and South is of Jamaican and Australian descent. (Georgia South's father, William South, is also a musician). They formed a band together on 20 March 2014 named BRAATS. Later that year they settled on the name Nova Twins, and released their first song "Bassline Bitch" under that name, in April 2015. That song attracted the attention of independent label Robotunes, which signed them and released their first self-titled EP in 2016.

After a show at French festival Rencontres Trans Musicales in December 2016, Nova Twins spent most of 2017 touring multiple countries and supported Prophets of Rage, after which Tom Morello named them "the best band you've never heard of". They have since supported Muse, Wolf Alice, Bring Me the Horizon, Little Simz, Yungblud, Dream Wife, Black Honey, Enter Shikari, Skunk Anansie, Muna, Foo Fighters, Evanescence, and Lenny Kravitz. In 2017 they self-released the singles "Thelma & Louise" and "Mood Swings", and started their own custom clothing line called Bad Stitches.

In 2018, Nova Twins self-released the singles "Hit Girl" and "Lose Your Head". They continued to tour with shows in Europe and America, including an appearance at the Afropunk festival in Brooklyn. Towards the end of that year they started recording their debut album with producer Jim Abbiss. In 2019, they toured with Prophets of Rage. The singles "Devil's Face" and "Vortex" from their upcoming album were released with accompanying music videos. They also collaborated with several brands, including Dr Martens on a global campaign, contributing both music and visuals. It was revealed later in the year that they would release their debut album Who Are the Girls? in collaboration with Fever 333's label 333 Wreckords Crew.

Their debut album Who Are the Girls? was released on February 28, 2020. Who Are the Girls? received positive reviews at Kerrang!, Clash, and elsewhere. The band won Best U.K. Breakthrough Band in the 2020 Heavy Music Awards.

Their second album Supernova was released on June 17, 2022 on Marshall Records and described by The Guardian as "a mindblowing blast of distorted noise-pop – and destroys the narrative about who gets to make rock music".Supernova was shortlisted for the 2022 Mercury Prize. Lead single "Antagonist" won Best Independent Track at the AIM Awards 2022. Nova Twins were named Band of the Year by Kerrang! Magazine in 2022 and nominated twice at The BRIT Awards 2023 in Group of the Year & Best Rock/Alternative Act categories.

In 2022 Nova Twins played shows across the UK, EU and US, including a sold-out headline show at Electric-Brixton. They covered Beyoncé’s "Break My Soul" as part of BBC Radio 1’s Live Lounge Month. Later that year Nova Twins released their first official remix of Sam Smith’s "Unholy Feat. Kim Petras".

In 2023, Nova Twins were the main support for the indie-pop band Muna during their Life's So Fun tour across their North American dates. Ahead of their 2023 Glastonbury performance on the Other Stage, Elton John praised Nova Twins, naming them as one of his top 4 acts to watch, claiming “these girls rock my world... they are just for me phenomenal”. Nova Twins supported Muse during their arena tour for the UK and Ireland dates in September and October 2023. In 2024, the band featured on the Foo Fighters arena tour around the US. In March 2025, they also supported Lenny Kravitz in a few cities in Germany, Denmark and France. In the same period as the tour with Foo Fighters, they recorded a new album with producer Rich Costey. That album, Parasites & Butterflies, was released on 29 August 2025 on Marshall Records.

Nova Twins have appeared on the front covers of Alternative Press, NME, Rock Sound, Upset, Notion, Total Guitar, DSCVRD, and Kerrang! three times.

== Musical style ==
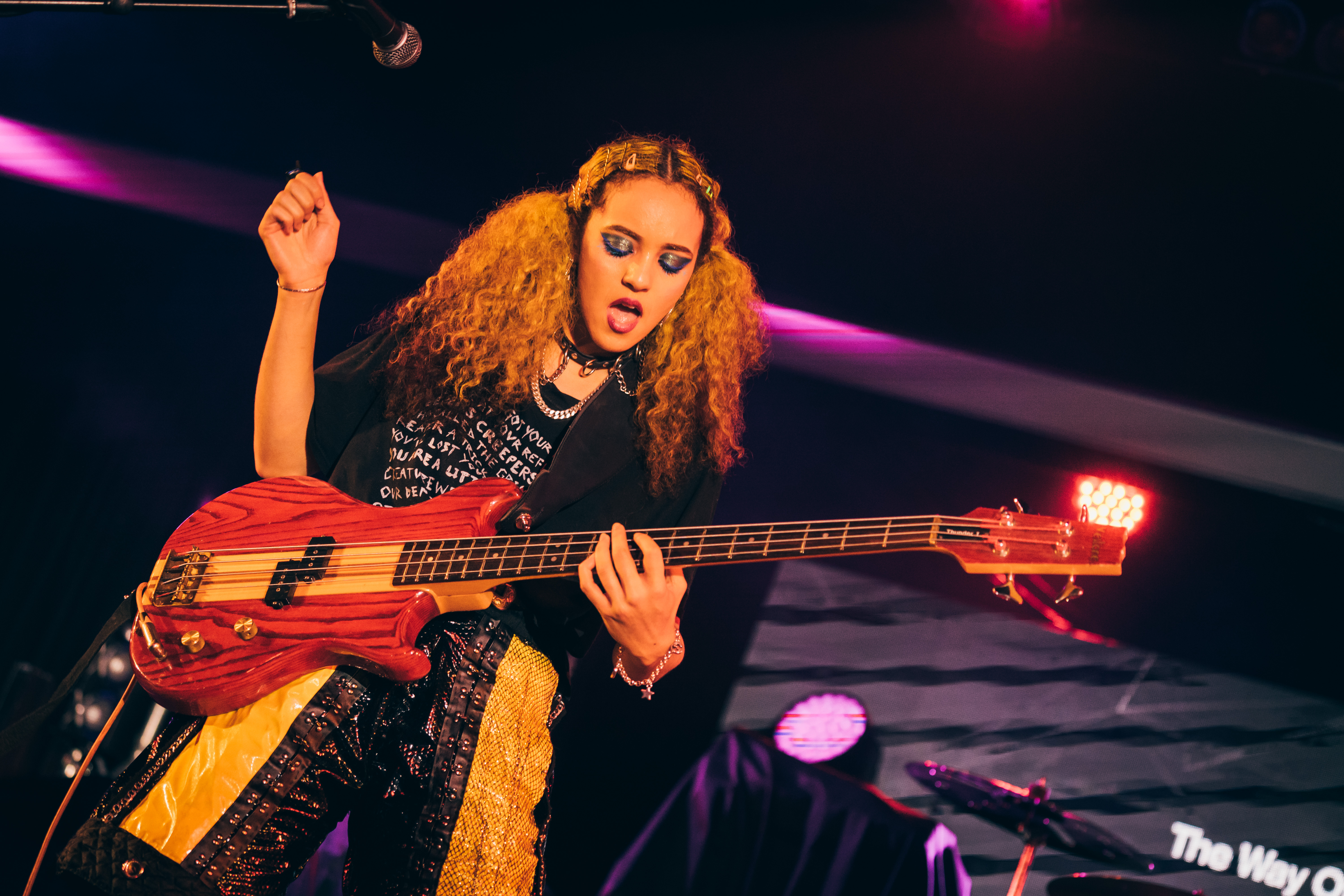
Nova Twins bassist Georgia South

Nova Twins have been described by The Guardian as a "bass-heavy duo fusing grime and punk", and by NME as "the [band] rewriting the rules of alternative music."

South and Love were first inspired by the music of Destiny's Child. Upon moving to London, Love heard music by the MC5, the New York Dolls, Kiss, the Sweet and Led Zeppelin, gaining an appreciation for live concert performance. South was influenced by Skrillex and N.E.R.D., and especially with the way that Timbaland manipulated instruments with electronic processing. Love cites the soloing style of Jack White and St. Vincent as influential. South praised the way that Missy Elliott "dresses how she wants to dress and how she wants to feel", and admired the "timeless" quality of her music. Love described how the Prodigy's "live energy is next to none."

== Activism ==
In 2021, Nova Twins penned an open letter to the MOBO Awards calling for them to introduce a Rock/Alternative category to their 2021 awards. In the letter, they highlighted the need for expanded representation within the genre. The MOBOs issued a response via Twitter, stating the letter had been received and the matter was being discussed internally. In 2022, MOBO Awards unveiled a brand-new category, Best Alternative Music Act with Nova Twins named as one of the first nominees.

In 2020 Nova Twins were named ambassadors for the Featured Artists Coalition, the UK trade body representing the specific rights and interests of music artists. In 2021, on International Women’s Day, Music Venue Trust announced the band as patrons of their UK registered charity, which acts to protect, secure and improve grassroots music venues. In the same year, the duo curated and released a 12-track limited-edition LP, Nova Twins Presents: Voices For The Unheard. The project showcased the breadth and diversity of POC talent within punk, rock and alternative music genres – from established artists to emerging talent. The record was backed by Dr. Martens and released by Blood Records exclusively on vinyl, with 100% of proceeds donated to The Black Curriculum, a social enterprise that aims to improve the teaching of Black History throughout the UK.

In 2023, Nova Twins launched a scholarship with London’s international music school ICMP, covering the cost of one undergraduate student’s tuition fees for a three-year BA (Hons) Creative Musicianship degree. The duo announced the scholarship on Twitter, stating: "Being given an opportunity can make all the difference and certainly if it wasn’t for the opportunities we’ve had, then Nova Twins wouldn't exist as we do today."

== Members ==
- Amy Love – guitars, lead vocals
- Georgia South – bass, backing vocals

Touring member

- Jake Woodward – drums, percussion

== Discography ==
=== Studio albums ===
| Title | Album details | Peak chart positions | | | |
| Title | Album details | UK | UK Ind. | UK Rock | SCO |
|---|---|---|---|---|---|
| Who Are the Girls? | Released: 28 February 2020; Label: 333 Wreckords Crew; Format: CD, LP, download | — | 28 | — | — |
| Supernova | Released: 17 June 2022; Label: Marshall; Format: CD, CS, LP, download | 27 | 2 | 1 | 13 |
| Parasites & Butterflies | Released: 29 August 2025; Label: Marshall; Format: CD, CS, LP, download | 27 | 4 | 1 | 10 |
"—" denotes a recording that did not chart or was not released in that territory

=== EPs ===
- Nova Twins EP (2016)
- Thelma and Louise EP (2017)
- Mood Swings EP (2017)

=== Singles ===
- "Hit Girl" (2018)
- "Mood Swings" (2018)
- "Lose Your Head" (2018)
- "Devil's Face" (2019)
- "Vortex" (2019)
- "Taxi" (2020)
- "Play Fair" (2020)
- "Antagonist" (2021)
- "K.M.B." (2022)
- "Cleopatra" (2022)
- "Puzzles" (2022)
- "Choose Your Fighter" (2022)
- "Monsters" (2025)
- "Soprano" (2025)
- "Piranha" (2025)
- "N.O.V.A" (2025)
- "Glory" (2025)

=== Features ===
- Vibrations EP (2017) – "Vibrations – Remix" – Koder
- Unpaintable EP (2020) – "Flitch" – Tsar B
- Flitch EP (2020) – "Flitch" – Tsar B
- Post Human: Survival Horror (2020) – "1x1" – Bring Me the Horizon
- “Bad Trip” (2023) - Pussy Riot
- Tomorrow We Escape (2025) – "Incline" – Ho99o9

=== Remixes ===
- “Unholy” (2023) - Sam Smith ft Kim Petras

== Awards and nominations ==
| Year | Award | Work | Category | Result | Ref. |
|---|---|---|---|---|---|
| 2020 | Heavy Music Awards | Nova Twins | Best UK Breakthrough Band | Won | |
| 2021 | Heavy Music Awards | "Taxi" | Best Video | Won | |
| 2021 | AIM Awards | Nova Twins | One To Watch | Nominated | |
| 2021 | Heavy Music Awards | Nova Twins | Best UK Band | Nominated | |
| 2022 | Mercury Prize | Supernova | Album of the Year | Nominated | |
| 2022 | MOBO Awards | Nova Twins | Best Alternative Music Act | Nominated | |
| 2022 | AIM Awards | "Antagonist" | Best Independent Track | Won | |
| 2022 | AIM Awards | Nova Twins | UK Independent Breakthrough | Nominated | |
| 2022 | Kerrang! Magazine | Nova Twins | Band of the Year | Won | |
| 2022 | Kerrang! Awards | Nova Twins | British Live Act | Won | |
| 2022 | NME Awards | Nova Twins | Best Band in the World | Nominated | |
| 2022 | NME Awards | Nova Twins | Best British Band | Nominated | |
| 2022 | Women in Music Awards | Nova Twins | New Artist | Won | |
| 2023 | BRIT Awards | Nova Twins | British Group | Nominated | |
| 2023 | BRIT Awards | Nova Twins | Rock/Alternative Act | Nominated | |
| 2023 | Rolling Stone UK Awards | Nova Twins | The Live Act Award | Nominated | |
| 2023 | AIM Awards | Supernova | Best Independent Album | Nominated | |
| 2023 | Berlin Music Video Awards | "Choose Your Fighter" | Best VFX | Nominated | |
| 2023 | Nordoff and Robbins O2 Silver Clef Awards | Nova Twins | Innovation Award | Won | |
| 2026 | MOBO Awards | Nova Twins | Best Alternative Music Act | Won | |
