= Stayaway =

2019 song by Muna

Single by Muna

from the album Saves the World
- Released: August 16, 2019
- Genre: Synth-pop; electropop; alt-pop
- Length: 3:26
- Label: RCA
- Songwriter: Muna
- Producers: John Hill; Muna

Muna singles chronology
| "Who" (2019) | "Stayaway" (2019) | "Taken" (2019) |

Music video
- "Stayaway" on YouTube

"Stayaway" is a song by the American band Muna from their second studio album, Saves the World (2019). The song was written by the band's members Katie Gavin, Josette Maskin, and Naomi McPherson, who produced it with John Hill. It was released by RCA Records on August 16, 2019, as the album's third single.

"Stayaway" is a synth-pop, electropop, and alt-pop song that incorporates influences of the 1980s. Lyrically, it is about struggling to maintain one's distance from an ex-romantic partner in the aftermath of a breakup. Inspired by some of lead singer Gavin's own failed relationships, the band described "Stayaway" as a song about understanding permanent changes required to eliminate harmful patterns and instill long-lasting improvements. Music critics praised the song's production and detailed, emotional lyrics, with many reviewers calling "Stayaway" some of Muna's best material released to that point.

A music video for "Stayaway" was released the same day as the single. Directed by Minnie Schedeen, it depicts the band returning home from a gig, where they had encountered an ex. Muna has performed "Stayaway" live on several occasions, including throughout their headlining concert tours, at Coachella, and their Tiny Desk Concert, both in 2023. The singer Kelly Clarkson covered the song on her eponymous talk show in 2023.

== Writing and release ==
The American band Muna took some time off from music after touring with Harry Styles as an opening act on the singer's Harry Styles: Live on Tour throughout 2017–2018. They began writing new material for what would become their second studio album, Saves the World, after completing "a long period of hibernation". "Stayaway" was written by the band's members Katie Gavin, Josette Maskin, and Naomi McPherson. Gavin, their lead singer, said "Stayaway" was one of the songs she wrote after having spent time adjusting to some significant life changes. Because Gavin had not recently been in a relationship at the time, she opted to write about an unhealthy relationship from her past, explaining that sometimes songwriters find it easier to write about pain once they are far enough removed from it. The singer drew inspiration from experiences in which she had found herself reflecting on failed past relationships through "rose-tinted glasses". Gavin considers "Stayaway" to be the most vocally demanding song on the album, and she had to re-learn how to sing it to accommodate changes in her singing voice.

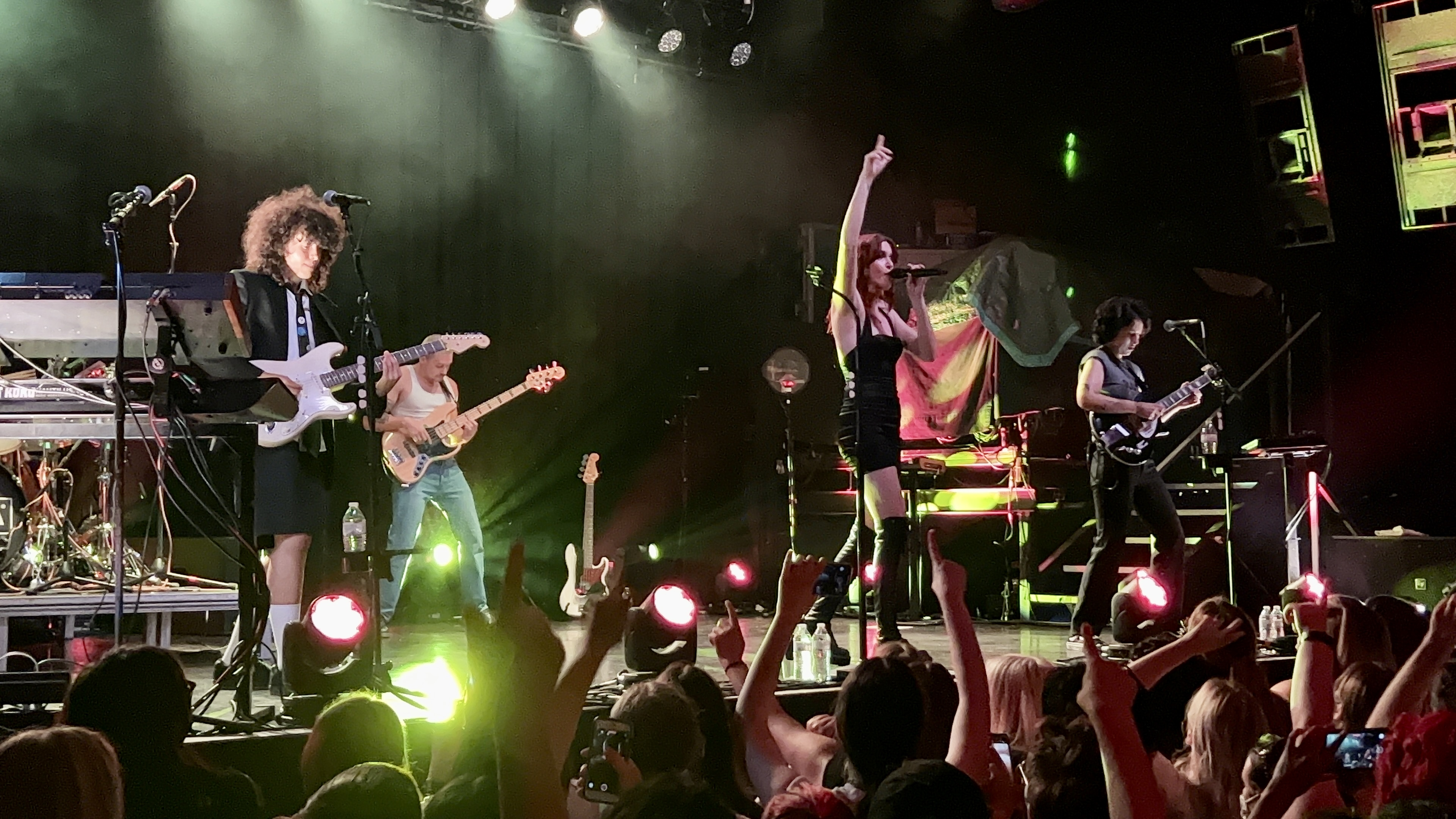
Muna performing in 2022.

According to guitarist Maskin, "Stayaway" was one of two songs that ultimately established the tone for the rest of the album sonically, "in terms of, every song on this record we wanted to try to go all the way". The band stated that the song is "about trying to rid yourself of a negative pattern and realising that it requires you to make a whole network of other changes", likening the experience to removing a small weed only to reveal a larger, more resilient root system that thrives on harmful behaviors and circumstances. Abstaining from said circumstances required the band members to rebuild themselves entirely. In a statement, Muna declared "For us, today, this song is a reminder of how hard it once was". Gavin said she was very proud of the song, and hoped its message would help fans move on from their own unhealthy relationships. The band produced it with the musician John Hill.

On August 12, 2019, Muna confirmed the song's release date on their social media accounts. RCA Records released "Stayaway" as the third single from Saves the World on August 16, 2019. Keyboardist McPherson identified "Stayaway" as the band's best song for getting over a breakup as of 2022, which they (Note: Naomi McPherson is non-binary and uses they/them pronouns.) had also called their favorite song to perform live in 2021.

== Music and lyrics ==
"Stayaway" is a synth-pop, electropop, and alt-pop power ballad, with 1980s influences. Building slowly "with a robot-voice breakdown", the track lasts three minutes and twenty-six seconds in duration, and is performed in the key of A major at 92 beats per minute. Critics have cited influences of R&B and dark pop in the song's production, which Alexandra Pollard of The Independent likened to the work of the electronic music duo Daft Punk. Billboard's Hannah Daily described it as an electro-pop rock song about the struggle to maintain distance from a former romantic partner amidst relentless reminders of them. Meanwhile, a writer for Austin City Limits called "Stayaway" a "soaring" pop anthem that "belongs in the twenty-first century", despite its retro influences.

A cyclical narrative, "Stayaway" is about the unexpected challenges encountered trying to keep one's distance from an ex-partner, recounting overlooked details about what occurs after a breakup. According to Loud and Quiet's Megan Wallace, the song eschews the "bravado" of most breakup anthems in favor of discussing how difficult breakups pale in comparison to their immediate aftermaths, and maintains that "the hardest part is not leaving that person, but rather not later going back to them". Its lyrical pattern invites listeners into the mind of a performer constantly being reminded of an ex. The singer grapples with the temptation to return to a past love and the struggle to move on, triggering a "downward spiral of thoughts", according to Sophie Dunne of Women. Beginning with a series of hypotheses that increase in speed to mimic "the pace at which anxiety supersedes logic", Gavin details locking herself in her bedroom to avoid temptations that could potentially reunite her with her ex, singing, "every moment is a fork in the road and every road leads back to you". Listing the measures she takes in an effort to get over them, she avoids listening to music out of fear of hearing her ex's favorite song. She also refuses to drive, socialize with friends, drink, or go dancing, admitting, "I don't do most things I used to do / Actually now that I'm thinking about it / I did most things to get to you". It includes the lyrics "Start believing you were right and / I was being too dramatic / So I gotta leave the light on ... For tonight / Just so I can stay away".

Gavin's voice begins as a whisper before crescendoing into a "desperate" belt. "Warped, twisted" vocal effects are applied as she sings "Leaving you was easy, now I gotta do what's hard / I gotta stay away...", over a "pulsating" dance beat. Gavin's voice is mirrored by "warping instrumentals to echo the track's spiraling vocal lines". Eventually, Gavin ascends to a higher octave to plea "If I don't stop it, before I know it, all the bad things never happened. You never lied or treated me bad and if you did, then you'll wish you hadn't". As per Ella Govrik of the Loyola Phoenix, the track reminds listeners "to avoid emotionally draining relationships". Apple Music said it is about "getting back into the game after ending a relationship". Pollard described its lyrics as "downright defeatist". "Stayaway" is one of Muna's songs that the band themselves have described as a "trauma banger", which they defined as any song that addresses difficult, traumatic subjects over "a banging beat".

== Reception ==
Articles published by contributors for both Nylon and Vulture highlighted "Stayaway" as one of music's best recent releases in August and December 2019, respectively. The Fader's Salvatore Maicki considered "Stayaway" to be among the "boldest-sounding material" the band had released to that point. Pride declared "Stayaway" "the defining track of" Saves the World, and Tara Bolar of UKC Radio called it one of the album's top-three tracks. Several reviewers named "Stayaway" a standout track from its parent album, while Angie Martoccio of Rolling Stone, Chloe Peterson of The Daily of the University of Washington, and Josh Osman of Varsity each deemed it a fan favorite.

Critics praised the song's lyrics and composition. Sophie Dunne of Women described "Stayaway" as a stunning, empathetic "description of life post-breakup", and Chris Zakorchemny of The Big Takeover called its bridge particularly "breathtaking". Writing for WKCO, Mikayla Connolly described it as a relatable "track that could easily pull crowds to the dance-floor", despite its heartbreaking lyrics.

Some writers agreed that "Stayaway" was among the strongest material they had heard from Muna to that point. For Loud and Quiet, Megan Wallace cited "Stayaway" as an example of the band exploring more nuanced feelings "than we’ve previously seen from them". Dave Fawbert of the i called the track "magnificent" and compared its detailed, emotional lyrics to the work of the singer-songwriter Taylor Swift. The Current ranked "Stayaway" among the 10 best songs of 2019, with author Cecilia Johnson praising how Gavin "uses plain language to describe post-break-up turmoil".

== Music video ==
The music video for "Stayaway" was released on August 16, 2019, the same day as the single. The video was directed by Minnie Schedeen, and Lidia Nikonova was cinematographer. In the video, Gavin stares at her reflection in a steamed-up bathroom mirror after a shower. She wipes the steam off the mirror, which transitions into herself from the previous evening. The promotional campaign for Saves the World featured multiple references to self-reflection and mirrors. The band encounters a former lover of Gavin at a bar they are performing at, but reverse their steps and return home.

== Live performances and covers ==
"Stayaway" was included on the set list of Muna's Saves the World tour. In 2019, Muna released an acoustic version of "Stayaway" for Spotify Singles. Billboard's Heran Mamo noted that vocal effects such as Auto-Tune had been omitted from this version. They also covered the singer Normani's 2019 song "Motivation" for the same occasion. Muna performed "Stayaway" on Jimmy Kimmel Live! in 2020.

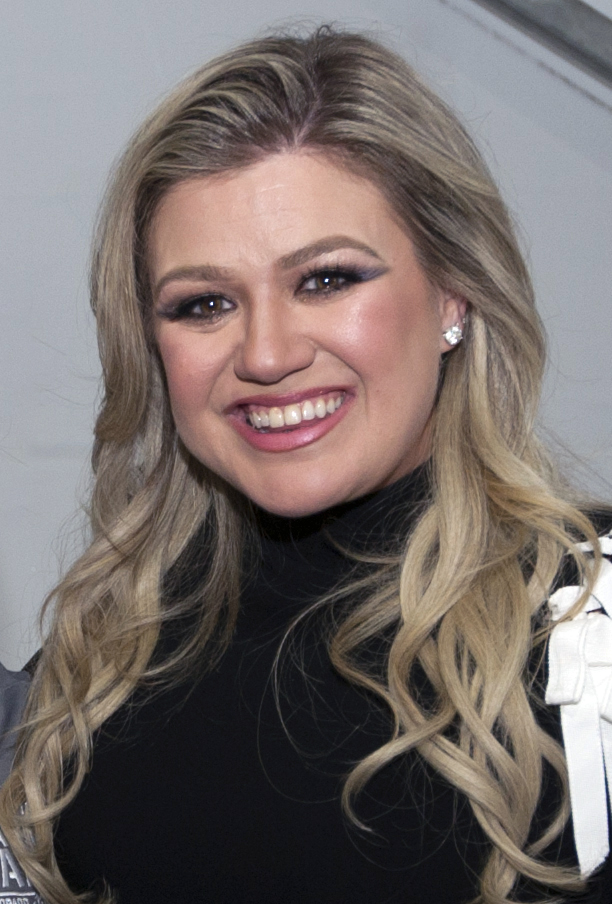
The singer Kelly Clarkson covered "Stayaway" on her talk show in 2023.

Emily Herbein of WXPN said a September 2021 performance at a concert of Phoebe Bridgers "showcased singer Katie Gavin's dynamic vocal range". In support of their third album, Muna (2022), the band has performed "Stayaway" throughout both their 2022 North American & UK Tour and 2023 Life's So Fun Tour, as well as during their opening act of Kacey Musgraves' 2022 Star-Crossed: Unveiled tour. They duetted the song with singer JoJo during a 2022 performance at the Wiltern Theatre. The Daily Trojan said JoJo "proved her talent in her crystal harmonies". Anna Govert of Paste described a rendition at Chicago's The Salt Shed as "done to perfection". In April 2023, Muna performed "Stayaway" as part of their Coachella set, which Lyndsey Havens of Billboard said "showcased the band's vocal power", followed by a "stripped down" rendition during their Tiny Desk Concert for NPR in June. According to the journalist Stephen Thompson, the song "placed such a demand on the three voices ... that they practically exploded with relief when it was over". In 2024, a live version of the song was released on their live album Live at The Greek Theatre in Los Angeles, a recording of their Greek Theatre concert from October 2023. Rachel R. Carroll of PopMatters called Gavin's vocal performance on the track "HERCULEAN". Beginning in 2023, Muna has performed "Stayaway" as part of their opening act for Taylor Swift's The Eras Tour. The band performed an acoustic version at the 2024 Newport Folk Festival, with the musicians tailoring the song to suit the festival's genre and showcase their vocals. Borrowing its arrangement from their Tiny Desk Concert, Maddie Browning of WBUR-FM said their "three-part harmonies ... gave me chills".

On October 13, 2020, the indie rock duo Now, Now released a remixed version of "Stayaway" entitled "Stayaway (Now, Now Remix)", with Muna remixing Now, Now's "Set it Free" in return. The singer Kelly Clarkson covered "Stayaway" with her studio band Y'all on a 2023 episode of her talk show The Kelly Clarkson Show. El Hunt of the Evening Standard said Clarkson's version "feels like it could easily be a classic 2000s power-banger", and Tom Breihan of Stereogum said Clarkson "sells the drama of the original track". Muna tweeted that they felt honored by Clarkson's cover.

== Credits and personnel ==
Credits adapted from Apple Music:

- Katie Gavin – lead singer, songwriter
- Naomi McPherson – guitar, synthesizer, programmer, songwriter
- Josette Maskin – guitar, songwriter
- Brian Robert Jones – bass
- Scott Heiner – drums
- John Hill – producer, programmer
- Ted Jensen – mastering engineer
- Dan Grech-Marguerat – mixing engineer
- Rob Cohen – engineer, vocal producer

== See also ==
- 1980s in music
