= Around U =

Around U may refer to

- "Around U", a song by Ellie Goulding from the 2015 album Delirium
- "Around U", a song by Muna from the 2017 album About U
