= Who Are the Girls? =

Studio album by Nova Twins
- Released: 28 February 2020
- Studios: Lime Green Monkeys (Saffron Walden, Essex)
- Genres: Electropunk; electronica; hip-hop; grime; nu metal; punk rock
- Length: 30:22
- Label: 333 Wreckords Crew
- Producers: Jim Abbiss; Kevin Van Bergen

Nova Twins chronology
Mood Swings (2017)	Who Are the Girls? (2020)	Supernova (2022)

Singles from Who Are the Girls?
- 1. "Lose Your Head" Released: 13 July 2018; 2. "Devil's Face" Released: 14 June 2019; 3. "Vortex" Released: 12 September 2019; 4. "Taxi" Released: 19 February 2020

Who Are the Girls? is the debut studio album by English rock duo Nova Twins, released 28 February 2020 through 333 Wreckords Crew. With the exception of "Lose Your Head", which was produced by Kevin Van Bergen and released as a single in 2018, the album's songs were recorded with producer Jim Abbiss at his Lime Green Monkeys recording studio in Saffron Walden between Nova Twins' tours of Europe in 2019. A genre-bending album predominately mixing elements from electropunk, electronica, hip-hop, grime, nu metal, and punk rock, Who Are the Girls? features energetic compositions and an abrasive sound that was intended to reflect that of Nova Twins' live shows. Lyrically, it centers on themes of social injustice, empowerment, diversity, and individuality.

Who Are the Girls? received critical acclaim, with music critics praising its unique and innovative sound, energy, and lyrical themes. The album placed on several end-of-year lists whilst its fourth single, "Taxi", won the "Best Music Video" award at the Heavy Music Awards 2021. Although most of Nova Twins' touring plans in support of Who Are the Girls? were scrapped due to the COVID-19 pandemic, internet word-of-mouth surrounding the album would help raise their profile and expand their fanbase during this time. In 2021, Nova Twins toured with Bring Me the Horizon and Enter Shikari and released a deluxe edition of the album featuring remixes of "Undertaker" by Fever 333 and "Bullet" by Dream Wife.

== Background and recording ==
Nova Twins were formed in London in 2014 by guitarist and vocalist Amy Love and bassist and backing vocalist Georgia South. The duo released their debut single, "Bassline Bitch", in 2015, followed by their eponymous debut extended play (EP) in 2016. They developed a following in the live London music scene before performing at various festivals in Europe and supporting artists including Prophets of Rage and Little Simz. After releasing the Thelma & Louise and Mood Swings EPs in 2017 and a few more singles, including the Kevin Van Bergen-produced "Lose Your Head" (2018), Nova Twins wrote and recorded Who Are the Girls? in between their tours of Europe in 2019. Both members would generally "vibe off" each other when writing and change things they felt didn't work. South generally wrote the music whilst Love composed "top line[s]". Shortly after they finishing writing, Nova Twins were sent an email by producer Jim Abbiss, whom had been introduced to their music by a member of Nothing but Thieves; the duo decided to work with him after meeting and completing a song together.

When we record in the studio, we want everything to be played live. With [Who Are the Girls?], that was our manifesto. Every riff, every sound, it has to be able to be portrayed live [...] We want to just do it all, tap-dancing [pedals] onstage, very manually.

— Georgia South

Recording sessions for Who Are the Girls? were held at Abbiss's Lime Green Monkeys recording studio in Saffron Walden. Love played a Gretsch Double Jet guitar through a Fender Hot Rod Deluxe combo amplifier, whilst South used a Westone Thunder 1 and a combination of Gallien-Krueger MB 212 and Marshall Valvestate guitar combo amplifiers. Moreso than on their previous releases, both members utilized an extensive collection of guitar and bass pedals, (Note: Nova Twins do not disclose the pedals they use and have duct taped their boards since their early shows due to people taking pictures of them.) which they and Abbiss attempted to procure "glitches" from. Nova Twins wanted the album to have no additional instrumental layers beyond guitar, bass, pedals, and drums, and recorded their songs live without the use of samples, synthesizers, or backing tracks. The duo were joined in the studio by drummers George McDonald and Tim Nugent; South felt both drummers brought "two different energies" to the album's songs, with Love highlighting McDonald's heavier rock style and Nugent's "hybrid hip hop sound". The duo continued to tweak the album up until ten minutes before they had to submit it.

== Composition ==
=== Overview ===
Who Are the Girls? is a genre-bending album that predominately mixes elements from electropunk, electronica, hip-hop, grime, nu metal, and punk rock. Music critics also highlighted elements from arena rock, alternative rock, pop, UK garage, dubstep, and rave music across the album. James McMahon of The Line of Best Fit viewed it as a "grungy pallette" of Nova Twins' influences, which included artists such as N.E.R.D., Missy Elliott, Timbaland, and Destiny's Child; Love drew additional influence from Deep Purple, the New York Dolls and Bette Davis, whilst South drew from Stevie Wonder, Donny Hathaway, and dubstep. Music critics frequently compared the album's sound with The Prodigy, whom Nova Twins cite as an influence.

Musically, Who Are the Girls? features energetic compositions and an abrasive sound intended to reflect that of Nova Twins' live shows. Its songs are primarily driven by South's basslines, which Josh Gray of Clash likened to a "dirty, street-gutter rumble", whilst Love performs "screeching" guitarwork that Ellie Robinson of Guitar World described as "grungy and punchy and almost dubstep-esque". Love intended her guitar parts to "add nuance" to South's basslines, and played them in a high, falsetto-esque octave to cut through the heavy bass sound. Tyler Damara Kelly of Dork described her vocals as alternating between "psychotic baby doll and razorblade rasp". Stephen Dalton of Classic Rock wrote that whilst the album was a "pretty relentless stampede", tracks such as "Bullet" and "Athena" showcased more "nuanced elements beneath [its] chaos" with their "melodic interludes".

The album's lyrics, drawing inspiration from Nova Twins' personal experiences and social politics, center on themes of social injustice, empowerment, diversity, and individuality. Its title, derived from the opening track "Vortex", is an ironic reference to the lack of representation and diversity at rock concerts and festivals Nova Twins attended and performed at. Love said that the title was already painted onto the car featured on the album cover and that Nova Twins used it as they felt it "was the embodiment of what we were trying to say" and was "kind of abstract".

=== Songs ===
"Vortex" is a female empowerment anthem that South described as representing the "ravey" side of Nova Twins' sound, which is self-mythologically referred to in its title and lyrics. Using dynamics to create what Damon Taylor of Dead Press! described as a "blistering and squealing crescendo", the song progresses from "sliding" basslines into "clamouring" drums and "screeching" guitars, with Love's vocals alternating between spoken word verses and screaming. "Play Fair" was intended as the "ultimate revenge tune" for people being held back by others, and displays distorted instrumentation with "grimey" basslines and "scattered" guitarwork. "Taxi" imagines Nova Twins driving in a pink Cadillac as "taxi-driving hit-girls"; the song was written with its video concept in mind, which was inspired by the action films Blade Runner, Kill Bill, The Matrix, and Sin City. Manuel Berger of laut.de highlighted the song for its complex arrangements of melody, rhythm and "sound experiments" underlying its "squeaking, filthy wall of noise". "Devil's Face" addresses Nova Twins' experiences with covert racism at the height of Brexit. "Not My Day" is about allowing oneself to be vulnerable and act out instead of masking themselves. Musically, the song blends chanted vocals with gliding bass lines and "colliding" distortion.

Nova Twins intended "Bullet" to encourage women to fight back against scrutiny for their sexuality and sexism and harassment, which are illustrated through the use of repetititve wolf-whistles and a verse at the end of the song referencing misogynistic rap music clichés. "Lose Your Head" is a song about celebrating difference that Jenessa Williams of NME compared to Nadia Rose, Limp Bizkit, and the Basement Jaxx song "Plug It In". "Ivory Tower" diverges from the rest of the songs on Who Are the Girls? with its balladic composition. Love said the song was intended to show Nova Twins could be "energetic as well as intimate"; South said that its demo version was reused on the album as Abbiss was unable to recreate its atmosphere and energy in the studio. Gray imagined "Undertaker" as the result of The Prodigy's Liam Howlett "re-pitch[ing]" the songs of Rage Against The Machine. Who Are the Girls?'s closing track, "Athena" features "fictional and mythological" lyrics, and experimental hooks and vocal patterns; the album subsequently ends with a "thunderous battering of bass and screeching vocals".

== Release and promotion ==
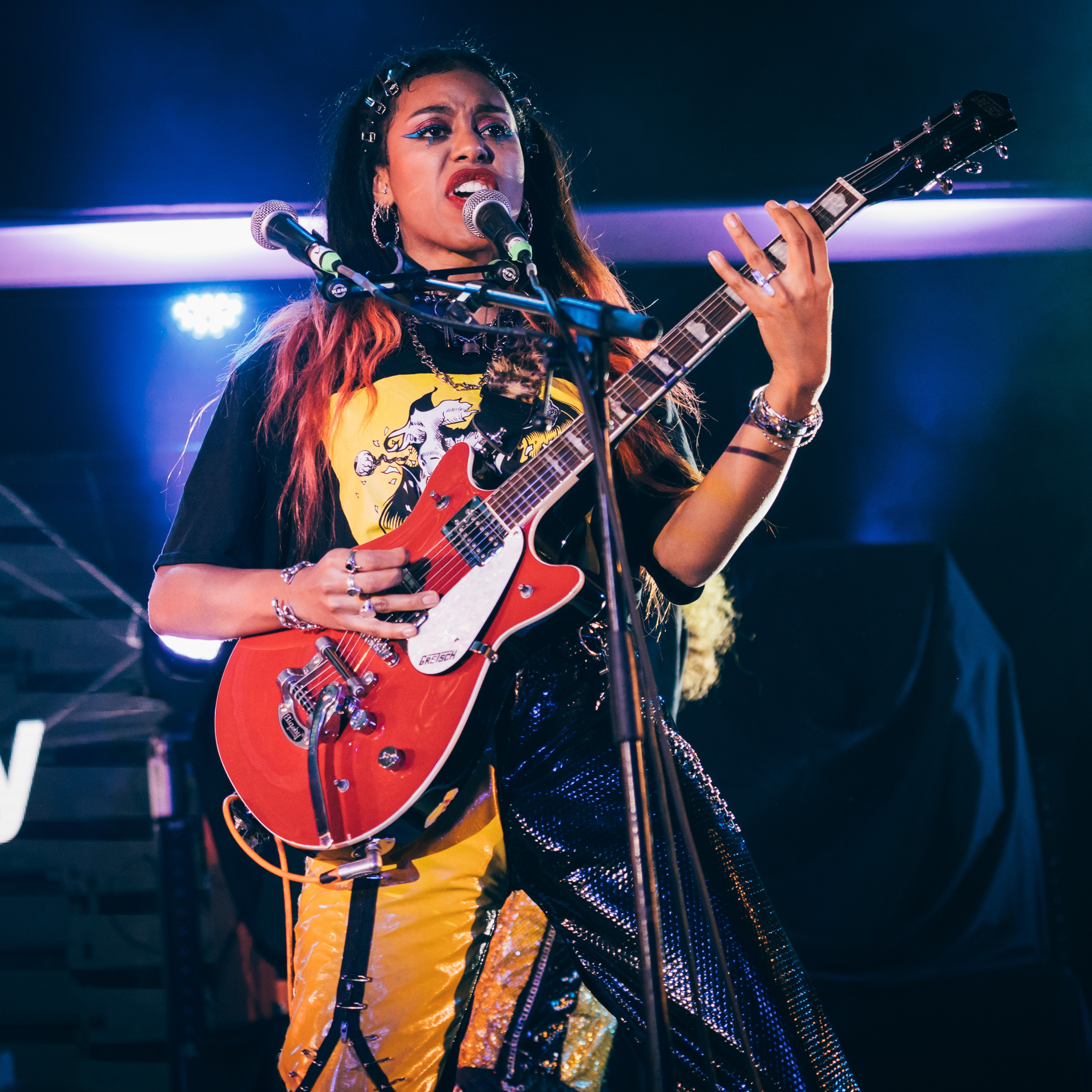
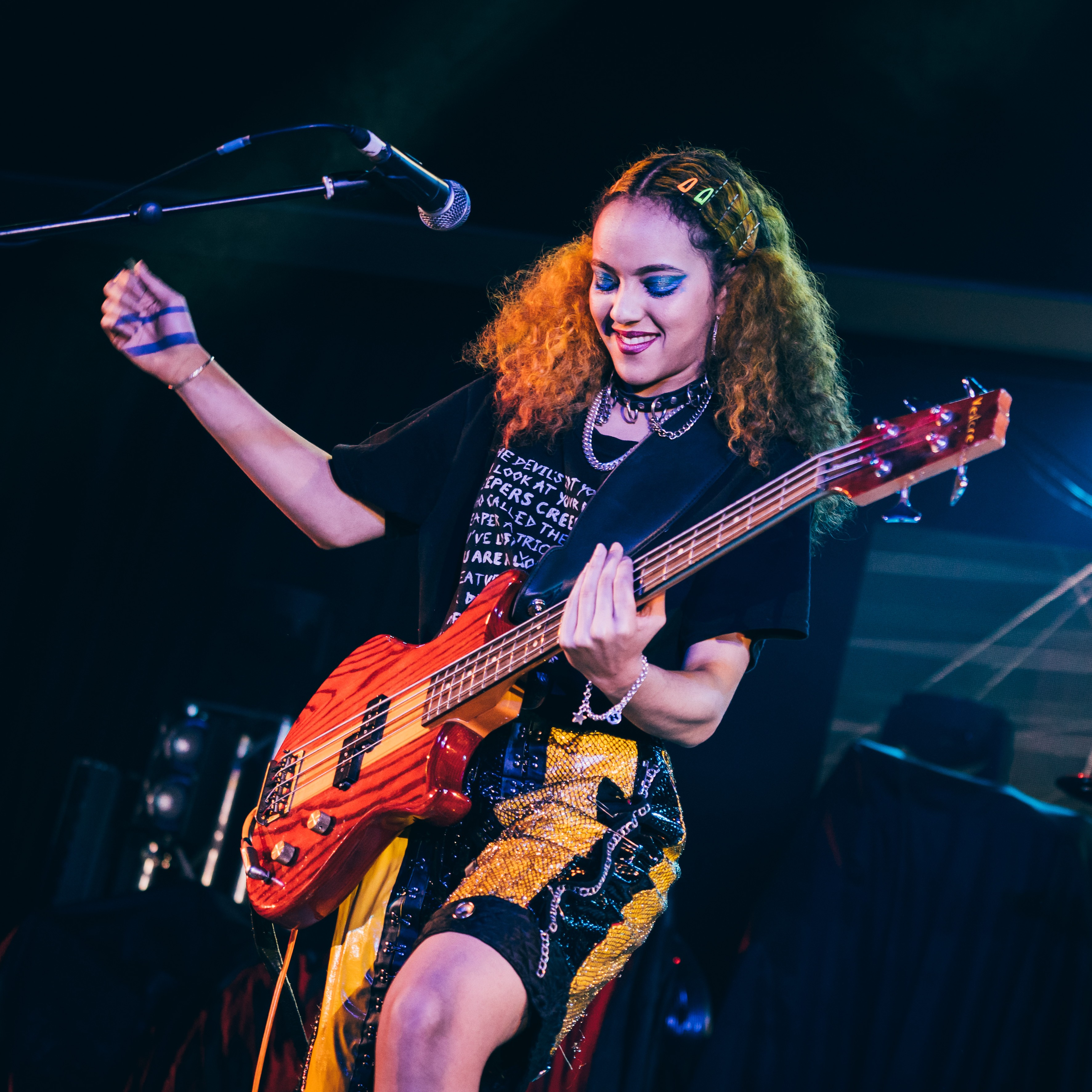
Amy Love (left) and Georgia South (right) of Nova Twins performing at the Rockaway Beach Festival in Bognor Regis in January 2020

Nova Twins released "Devil's Face" and "Vortex" as singles on 14 June and 12 September 2019, respectively. On 3 December 2019, the duo announced Who Are the Girls? and their signing to Jason Aalon Butler's record label and collective 333 Wreckords Crew as its first act. Butler asked Nova Twins to join 333 Wreckords Crew after seeing them perform at the 2018 Afropunk Festival, and gave them ownership of the master recordings of their releases through the label. After the release of "Taxi" as its fourth and final single on 12 February, Who Are the Girls? was released on 28 February 2020.

Nova Twins had planned to support Who Are the Girls? with extensive touring throughout 2020, which included scheduled performances at the Glastonbury and Reading and Leeds festivals and shows in Russia and the United States. The duo embarked on a short headlining tour of the United Kingdom in early February 2020, and played ten shows in France before the COVID-19 pandemic forced them to scrap the remaining dates and return to the United Kingdom on 13 March 2020. After three weeks, the duo began writing their second album, Supernova (2022), and started interacting with fans online and organizing challenges for them. They also played some virtual live shows, hosted the Instagram Live show Voices For The Unheard in support of Black Lives Matter and alternative artists of colour, and released collaborations with Tsar B and Bring Me the Horizon.

Internet word-of-mouth surrounding Who Are the Girls? helped raise Nova Twins' profile and expand the duo's fanbase during the pandemic; Lou Boyd of The Red Bulletin considered the album to be "one of the success stories" to come from that time, whilst Emma Wilkes of DIY called it a sleeper hit. South believed that the pandemic gave the Nova Twins greater publicity as people had more time to listen to new music, and that the duo was surprised by how many people discovered Who Are the Girls? during that time; Love likewise believed the album would not have performed as well had they solely focused on their live shows. On 18 September 2020, a music video for "Play Fair" was released. In April 2021, Nova Twins released remixes of "Undertaker" by Fever 333 and "Bullet" by Dream Wife, and embarked on a headlining tour of the United Kingdom. After supporting Bring Me the Horizon on a September 2021 arena tour of the United Kingdom, Nova Twins released a deluxe edition of Who Are the Girls? on 5 October 2021, featuring the "Undertaker" and "Bullet" remixes. In December, the duo toured as a supporting act for Enter Shikari.

== Critical reception ==
Professional ratings
Aggregate scores
Source	Rating
Metacritic	81/100
Review scores
Source	Rating
Clash	8/10
Classic Rock	8/10
Dead Press!	9/10
DIY	3.5/5 stars
Distorted Sound	10/10
Dork	4/5 stars
Kerrang!	4/5
laut.de	4/5 stars
Tom Hull – on the Web	A−
Upset	4/5 stars

Who Are the Girls? received critical acclaim. On review aggregator website Metacritic, the album holds a score of 81 out of 100, based on reviews from four critics. Kerrang!'s John Longbottom highlighted the album's "furious themes" and "explosive energy" and declared Nova Twins' sound to be unique in the current rock music scene. Damon Taylor of Dead Press! viewed it as showing "a duo pushing both boundaries and themselves forward" and felt they had "not only crafted a defiant and unique sound, but also a record with important narratives that demand to be heard." Maria Serra of Alternative Press believed its "out-of-this-world songwriting" would "bring a much-needed refresher to the heavy rock scene." Yasmine Summann of Distorted Sound believed the album was "arguably the next sound of the [2020s]" and that it would make listeners "reconsider what defines 'angry punk' from a new perspective that's been overlooked and white-washed for decades". In the closing paragraph of his review for Clash, Gray remarked: "You have never heard two women have this much fun with a metric fucktonne of distortion pedals, but if you do in the future, then the way will have been paved by Nova Twins."

NME's Ali Shutler lauded Who Are the Girls? as "a colourful and hyperactive record that refuses to play by anyone else's rules". Tyler Damara Kelly of Dork praised the duo's performances and dynamics, whilst a writer for Upset described it as being "unrelenting bordering psychotic in the best way possible". Sophie Williams of Guitar.com called the album "incendiary" and "utterly invigorating", opining that Nova Twins' nonconformist attitude to genre made them "all the more enticing". Manuel Berger of laut.de praised Nova Twins' abilities to mix hooks into their aggressive sound and compared the duo's mixing of genres with Fever 333. He felt that whilst most of Who Are the Girls?'s tracks were largely similar to each other, they collectively made for an "incredible impact". Ben Lynch of DIY felt that Nova Twins were occasionally "overzealous with the effects" on songs like "Taxi", but commended their "gripping collision of influences" on the album and "commitment to doing it so forcefully". Max Skefton of The Skinny said that whilst the album "[offered] rock music from a fresh perspective, it did sometimes have issues with consistency and pace".

Who Are the Girls? was listed as one of the best albums of 2020 by Alternative Press, Distorted Sound, Kerrang!, and Louder Than War. Guitar.com listed it as one of the Best Guitar Albums of 2020, whilst Loudwire and NME listed it as one of the year's best debut albums. Nova Twins were named "Best Breakthrough Band" at the Heavy Music Awards 2020. At the 2021 ceremony, the duo were nominated for the "Best UK Artist" award and "Taxi" won the "Best Music Video" award.

== Track listing ==
All tracks are written by Amy Love and Georgia South.

Who Are the Girls? – Standard edition track listing
No.	Title	Length
1.	"Vortex"	3:09
2.	"Play Fair"	3:33
3.	"Taxi"	3:21
4.	"Devil's Face"	2:44
5.	"Not My Day"	2:14
6.	"Bullet"	3:04
7.	"Lose Your Head"	3:03
8.	"Ivory Tower"	2:18
9.	"Undertaker"	3:49
10.	"Athena"	3:14
Total length:		30:22

Deluxe edition bonus tracks
No.	Title	Length
11.	"Undertaker" (Fever 333 remix)	2:16
12.	"Bullet" (Dream Wife remix)	3:20
Total length:		35:58

== Personnel ==
Personnel per liner notes.

Nova Twins
- Amy Love – guitar, lead vocals
- Georgia South – bass, backing vocals

Additional personnel

- George MacDonald – drums (1, 3–5, 9, 10)
- Tim Nugent – drums (2, 6, 7)

Artwork

- Harry Lindley – photography
- Nathan Roach – photography
- Sanaa Abstrakt – photography
Production
- Jim Abbiss – production (1–6, 8–10)
- Kevin Van Bergen – production, mixing (7)
- Edd Hartwell – engineering
- Fabio Senna – assistant engineer
- Tommaso Colliva – mixing (1, 2, 4–8, 10)
- Zach Jones – mixing (3, 9), remixing (2)
- Dick Beetham – mastering

== Charts ==
Chart performance for Who Are the Girls?
Chart (2021)	Peak position
UK Album Sales (OCC)	81
UK Physical Albums (OCC)	76
UK Vinyl Albums (OCC)	28
UK Independent Albums (OCC)	28
UK Independent Album Breakers (OCC)	15

== Release history ==
Release history for Who Are the Girls?
Initial release date	Label	Format	Ref.
28 February 2020	333 Wreckords Crew	CD; LP	
5 October 2021	333 Wreckords Crew	CD+LP (deluxe edition)	
