= Supernova (Nova Twins album) =

Studio album by Nova Twins
- Released: 17 June 2022
- Studio: Marshall (Milton Keynes); Long Wave Recording (Cardiff); Nova Twins HQ; Musa (Liverpool)
- Genre: Alternative rock; punk rock; rap rock
- Length: 30:53
- Label: Marshall
- Producer: Jim Abbiss; Nova Twins; Romesh Dodangoda

Nova Twins chronology
Who Are the Girls? (2020)	Supernova (2022)	Parasites & Butterflies (2025)

Singles from Supernova
- 1. "Antagonist" Released: 27 October 2021; 2. "K.M.B." Released: 2 February 2022; 3. "Cleopatra" Released: 16 March 2022; 4. "Puzzles" Released: 11 May 2022; 5. "Choose Your Fighter" Released: 13 June 2022

Supernova is the second full-length album by British rock duo Nova Twins, released 17 June 2022 by Marshall Records. The album peaked at No. 14 and No. 27 on the Scottish and UK album charts, respectively, and was nominated for the 2022 Mercury Prize.

== Background ==
The album's impending release was announced in February 2022, with the songs "Antagonist", "K.M.B.", "Cleopatra", "Puzzles" and "Choose Your Fighter" issued as singles to preview the album. The album's lyrics are inspired by Nova Twins' experiences playing live before increasingly diverse audiences, after a long layoff from touring during the COVID-19 pandemic, which was particularly challenging because their previous album Who Are the Girls? was beginning to attract critical notice just before the onset of the pandemic. The album is also inspired by the racial justice developments of the period. As described by the band: "making this album became our medicine through a turbulent time. It’s a reflection of where we were and how far we have come, encased in a fantasy world that we imagined."

== Critical reception ==
Professional ratings
Aggregate scores
Source	Rating
AnyDecentMusic?	8.5/10
Metacritic	92/100
Review scores
Source	Rating
Clash	8/10
DIY	5/5 stars
Dork	5/5 stars
Gigwise	8/10 stars
The Guardian	4/5 stars
Kerrang!	4/5
The Line of Best Fit	8/10
Metal Hammer	4/5 stars
NME	5/5 stars
The Telegraph	5/5 stars

Supernova received critical acclaim. On review aggregator website Metacritic, the album holds a score of 92 out of 100, based on reviews from ten critics, which indicates "universal acclaim". The Guardian praised the album's "sharp, concise songwriting [that] makes for a mindblowing blast of distorted noise-pop – and destroys the narrative about who gets to make rock music." Many reviewers noted the Nova Twins' blending of disparate genres, with Distorted Sound proclaiming that the album "show[s] that genre is worthless." NME called the album "More dynamic, more experimental and with far more range than what’s come before." Consequence reached a similar conclusion, stating that "Nova Twins bend and blend genres like alchemists, generating a sound specific to them and the undertones of their social movement."

The Forty Five called the album "a triumph" that "should make Nova Twins an unignorable force from hereon in." The Line of Best Fit praised the band for "marry[ing] politically charged lyricism with a searing amalgamation of genres, producing an album that practically begs to be experienced in a full-throttle live setting." In its review of the album, Ghost Cult magazine concluded that "Nova Twins are rising as torchbearers for the future of rock music, flawlessly executing elements no one would've ever expected to hear from the style ten years ago."

== Track listing ==
All lyrics are written by Amy Love; all music is composed by Amy Love and Georgia South.

Supernova track listing
No.	Title	Producer(s)	Length
1.	"Power (Intro)"	Nova Twins	0:54
2.	"Antagonist"	Nova Twins; Jim Abbiss	3:06
3.	"Cleopatra"	Nova Twins; Abbiss	3:30
4.	"K.M.B."	Nova Twins; Abbiss	3:15
5.	"Fire & Ice"	Nova Twins; Abbiss	2:53
6.	"Puzzles"	Nova Twins; Abbiss	2:42
7.	"A Dark Place for Somewhere Beautiful"	Nova Twins; Abbiss	3:33
8.	"Toolbox"	Nova Twins; Romesh Dodangoda	2:34
9.	"Choose Your Fighter"	Nova Twins; Dodangoda	2:15
10.	"Enemy"	Nova Twins; Dodangoda	2:51
11.	"Sleep Paralysis"	Nova Twins; Abbiss	3:20
Total length:			30:53

== Personnel ==
=== Nova Twins ===
- Amy Love – guitar, lead vocals
- Georgia South – bass, backing vocals, drum programming

=== Additional personnel ===
- Jake Woodward – drums (tracks 1, 2, 6, 8, 11)
- George MacDonald – drums (tracks 3, 4, 5, 7, 9, 10)
- Gerard Roberts – additional drum programming (tracks 3, 4, 5)
- Romesh Dodangoda – additional programming (tracks 8, 9, 10)

== Charts ==
Chart performance for Supernova
Chart (2022)	Peak position
Scottish Albums (OCC)	13
UK Albums (OCC)	27
UK Independent Albums (OCC)	2
UK Rock & Metal Albums (OCC)	1
