= So When You Gonna... =

Studio album by Dream Wife
- Released: 3 July 2020
- Length: 38:37
- Label: Lucky Number
- Producer: Marta Salogni

Dream Wife chronology
Dream Wife (2018)	So When You Gonna... (2020)	Social Lubrication (2023)

So When You Gonna... is the second studio album by British punk rock band Dream Wife, released through Lucky Number on 3 July 2020. It was produced by Marta Salogni and received favourable reviews from critics.

== Critical reception ==
Professional ratings
Aggregate scores
Source	Rating
AnyDecentMusic?	7.3/10
Metacritic	77/100
Review scores
Source	Rating
AllMusic	4/5 stars
Clash	9/10
DIY	3/5 stars
Exclaim!	4/5 stars
The Line of Best Fit	7/10
NME	4/5 stars
The Observer	3/5 stars
Paste	7.9/10
Under the Radar	7/10 stars

So When You Gonna... received a score of 77 out of 100 on review aggregator Metacritic based on 13 critics' reviews, indicating "generally favorable" reception.

== Track listing ==
So When You Gonna... track listing
No.	Title	Length
1.	"Sports!"	3:24
2.	"Hasta la Vista"	3:42
3.	"Homesick"	3:03
4.	"Validation"	2:54
5.	"Temporary"	2:55
6.	"U Do U"	3:43
7.	"Rh Rn"	3:31
8.	"Old Flame"	3:43
9.	"So When You Gonna..."	3:39
10.	"Hold on Me"	3:58
11.	"After the Rain"	5:48
Total length:		40:00

== Charts ==
Chart performance for So When You Gonna...
Chart (2020)	Peak position
Scottish Albums (OCC)	5
UK Albums (OCC)	18
UK Independent Albums (OCC)	2
