= Dancing on the Wall =

Studio album by Muna
- Released: May 8, 2026
- Genre: Pop
- Length: 39:50
- Labels: Saddest Factory; Dead Oceans
- Producer: Naomi McPherson

Muna chronology
Muna (2022)	Dancing on the Wall (2026)

Singles from Dancing on the Wall
- 1. "Dancing on the Wall" Released: February 10, 2026; 2. "So What" Released: March 17, 2026; 3. "Wannabeher" Released: April 14, 2026

Dancing on the Wall is the fourth studio album by the American indie pop band Muna. It followed their commercial breakthrough album Muna, and was supported by three singles - the title track, "So What", and "Wannabeher".

The album was released on May 8, 2026, by Saddest Factory Records.

== Background ==
Muna's previous album, Muna, was their best selling album to date, and their first album to chart on the Billboard 200, the UK Albums Chart, and other international charts, and its lead single, Silk Chiffon, saw success, and significantly raised the band's profile.

Since its release, they also joined several high-profile acts on tour, including Lorde and Taylor Swift.

In 2024, lead singer Katie Gavin released her debut solo album, What a Relief, in a more acoustic, folk pop direction compared to Muna's output.

== Writing and composition ==
The band were inspired by the political climate in the US under the second Trump administration in the writing of the album, citing M. Gessen's book Surviving Autocracy as an influence. Maskin noted that while their previous albums had also featured political themes, Big Stick was the most overtly political song they'd released.

Several publications noted the album as having a darker sonic palatte than the lighter pop sound of their self-titled record. The band described as a "dark, poppy, intense, sweaty. funky dance album" as opposed to being the "'queer joy mini-skirt rollerblade' band" of the previous record. The album is also more consistently upbeat than previous albums, noted by McPherson as influenced by Gavin having released a solo record of folk music.

== Release and promotion ==
On February 4, 2026, Muna released video clips on Instagram promoting the new song "It Gets So Hot", which was released via the band's website five days later on February 9.

They then announced on Instagram that same day that "Dancing On The Wall" would be released on February 10. Along with the release of the latter single, they announced their fourth album, of the same name, was to be released on May 8. At the same time, a short tour of intimate album release shows in smaller venues were announced, for May.

On March 17, they released the second official single from the album, "So What", with an accompanying music video.

On March 31, they announced the song "Big Stick" would be available for purchase for 48 hours via Bandcamp, with proceeds going toward Pal Humanity.

On April 14, Muna released the third single "Wannabeher".

On May 8, concurrent with the release of the album, a video for "Eastside Girls" was released, and the band announced a tour behind the album, set for September - October 2026.

== Reception ==
Professional ratings
Aggregate scores
Source	Rating
Metacritic	73/100
Review scores
Source	Rating
AllMusic	3/5 stars
Clash	8/10
DIY	4/5 stars
Dork	5/5 stars
Exclaim!	6/10
NME	7/10
Paste	C+
Pitchfork	7.6/10
Slant Magazine	7/10

The album was released upon "generally favorable reviews", according to review aggregator Metacritic from a weighted average score of 73 out of 100 from ten critic scores.

== Track listing ==
All tracks are written by Katie Gavin, Josette Maskin, and Naomi McPherson, with additional writers noted.

Dancing on the Wall track listing
No.	Title	Writer(s)	Length
1.	"It Gets So Hot"	Daniel Tashian	2:41
2.	"Dancing on the Wall"		4:03
3.	"Eastside Girls"		3:50
4.	"Wannabeher"	Leland	2:34
5.	"On Call"		2:35
6.	"So What"		4:31
7.	"Party's Over"		0:19
8.	"Big Stick"		2:36
9.	"Mary Jane"	Justin Tranter	4:12
10.	"Girl's Girl"	Tranter	3:13
11.	"...Unless"		0:16
12.	"Why Do I Get a Good Feeling"		4:53
13.	"Buzzkiller"		4:07
Total length:			39:50

No.	Title	Writer(s)	Length
1.	"Dancing on the Wall - Avalon Emerson Sweet Thing Remix"	Avalon Emerson	5:14
2.	"Dancing on the Wall - Romy in a Lesbian Trance Remix"	Romy Madley Croft	3:02
3.	"So What - Arlo Parks Summer was Ecstacy Version"	Arlo Parks	4:31
4.	"Buzzkiller - Porches Nevada Remix"	Porches	4:02
Total length:			16:49

== Personnel ==
Credits are adapted from Tidal.

=== Muna ===
- Katie Gavin – arrangement, additional production (all tracks); vocals, background vocals (tracks 1–6, 8–10, 12, 13); vocal arrangement (2, 3, 5, 8, 9, 12, 13)
- Josette Maskin – arrangement, additional production (all tracks); background vocals, additional engineering (1–6, 8–10, 12, 13); electric guitar (1–6, 8, 9), vocal arrangement (2, 3, 5, 8–10, 12, 13), acoustic guitar (3, 6), lead guitar (10, 12, 13)
- Naomi McPherson – arrangement, production (all tracks); synthesizer programming (1–6, 8–11); background vocals, drum machine, programming, synth bass, synthesizer, engineering, vocal engineering (1–6, 8–10, 12, 13); keyboards (1, 5, 6, 8–10, 12), baritone guitar (2, 5, 8), vocal arrangement (2, 3, 5, 8–10, 12, 13), mixing (7, 11), rhythm guitar (10), piano (13)

=== Additional contributors ===
- Joe LaPorta – mastering
- Sarab Singh – drums, percussion (1–6, 8–10, 12, 13)
- Dan Grech-Marguerat – programming, mixing (1–6, 8–10, 12, 13)
- Geo Botelho – engineering (1–6, 8–10, 12, 13), fretless bass guitar (1), electric bass guitar (2–4)
- Ivan Barry – engineering assistance (1–6, 8–10, 12, 13)
- Luke Burgoyne – mixing assistance (1–6, 8–10, 12, 13)
- Seb Maletka-Catala – mixing assistance (1–6, 8–10, 12, 13)
- Daniel Tashian – synth bass, synthesizer programming (1, 5); keyboards, synthesizer (1)
- Lou Roy – background vocals, vocal arrangement (2, 3, 5, 8–10, 12, 13)
- Phoenix Rousiamanis – violin (11–13)

== Charts ==
Chart performance for Dancing on the Wall
Chart (2026)	Peak position
French Rock & Metal Albums (SNEP)	95
Irish Independent Albums (IRMA)	19
Scottish Albums (Official Charts)	7
UK Albums (Official Charts)	64
UK Independent Albums (Official Charts)	7
US Billboard 200	160
US Independent Albums (Billboard)	23
US Top Rock & Alternative Albums (Billboard)	42
