= What a Relief =

Studio album by Katie Gavin
- Released: October 25, 2024
- Studio: Sound City (Los Angeles)
- Genre: Folk-pop
- Length: 39:20
- Label: Saddest Factory
- Producer: Tony Berg

What a Relief is the debut studio album by Katie Gavin, lead singer of indie pop group MUNA, released through Saddest Factory Records on October 25, 2024. Essentially a folk-pop album, "What a Relief" received generally favorable reviews from critics.

== Background ==
Written over the course of seven years, What a Relief comprises a set of songs that Gavin always loved but which "had something in them" that she and her bandmates felt did not quite fit within the universe they were trying to cultivate with Muna. Many of them were written on acoustic guitar.

The album's cover art is a photograph taken by Catherine Opie at Gavin's home.

The album was released on October 25, 2024.

Prior to the album's release, she released three singles "Aftertaste", "Casual Drug Use" and "Inconsolable".

== Critical reception ==
Professional ratings
Aggregate scores
| Source | Rating |
|---|---|
| Metacritic | 77/100 |
Review scores
| Source | Rating |
| Clash | 8/10 |
| Exclaim! | 6/10 |
| The Line of Best Fit | 7/10 |
| Paste | 8.3/10 |
| Pitchfork | 7.5/10 |

According to the review aggregator Metacritic, What a Relief received "generally favorable reviews" based on a weighted average score of 77 out of 100 from 5 critic scores.

Marissa Lorusso of Pitchfork stated, "While it doesn't reach the soaring highs of Gavin's work with MUNA, What a Relief offers introspective self-portraits whose sound calls back to Gavin's youth and stories rich with the kind of empathy that's only gained over time." Robin Murray of Clash called the album "a valuable insight into a profound creative talent, and a gorgeous listen." Rachel Kelly of Exclaim! commented that "The album highlights Gavin's distinctive vocals and lyricism in a contemporary update of Lilith-core folk music, but the entire project feels intimidated by its own potential."

=== Accolades ===
Year-end lists for What a Relief
| Publication | List | Rank | Ref. |
|---|---|---|---|
| Billboard | The 20 Best Pride Albums of 2024 | — | |
| Cosmopolitan | The Best Albums of 2024 | — | |
| Crack | The Top 50 Albums of 2024 | 50 | |
| DIY | Albums of the Year 2024 | 17 | |
| Paste | The 40 Best Debut Albums of 2024 | 37 | |
| Rolling Stone | The 50 Best Indie Rock Albums of 2024 | 43 | |
| Vogue | The 36 Best Albums of 2024 | — | |

== Track listing ==
All tracks written by Katie Gavin, except "Inconsolable" (Gavin, Eric Radloff).

| No. | Title | Length |
|---|---|---|
| 1. | "I Want It All" | 2:46 |
| 2. | "Aftertaste" | 3:24 |
| 3. | "The Baton" | 3:24 |
| 4. | "Casual Drug Use" | 3:11 |
| 5. | "As Good As It Gets" (Feat. Mitski) | 3:02 |
| 6. | "Sanitized" | 4:04 |
| 7. | "Sketches" | 2:51 |
| 8. | "Inconsolable" | 3:32 |
| 9. | "Sparrow" | 3:53 |
| 10. | "Sweet Abby Girl" | 2:56 |
| 11. | "Keep Walking" | 3:06 |
| 12. | "Today" | 2:55 |
| Total length: | | 39:20 |

Note: "Keep Walking" contains an uncredited interpolation, not originally listed in the album's liner notes, of a still uncertain composition by Sinéad O'Connor, whose composition credit was formalized after the album's release, but no further information was provided by Gavin or O'Connor's estate.

== Personnel ==
Musicians

- Katie Gavin – vocals (all tracks), guitar (tracks 1, 9, 12), violin (2, 4), shruti box (2), acoustic guitar (5, 10)
- Geo Botelho – bass (tracks 1, 2, 4, 9, 10, 12)
- Gabe Noel – cello (tracks 1, 7), bass (8)
- Andrea Whitt – pedal steel (tracks 1, 9)
- Josette Maskin – tamburica (tracks 1, 10, 11), guitar (2, 4, 12), bouzouki (2), electric sitar (4), electric guitar (5), acoustic guitar (10), 12-string guitar (11)
- Sarab Singh – drums (tracks 2, 3, 5, 6, 10, 11), percussion (5), tabla (10)
- Benny Bock – synthesizer (tracks 2, 3, 5, 7, 9, 10), pump organ (3), piano (6, 9), Wurlitzer (6), guitar (7), electric birds (9)
- Mason Stoops – guitar (track 2), acoustic guitar (6)
- Nana Adjoa – bass (tracks 3, 5–7, 11)
- Eric Radloff – background vocals (track 3), harmony vocals (10)
- Sara Watkins – fiddle, background vocals (tracks 3, 8)
- Will Maclellan – programming (tracks 4, 5, 7, 10, 12)
- Mitski Miyawaki – vocals (track 5)
- Sean Watkins – guitar, background vocals, mandolin (track 8)
- Tony Berg – Mellotron (track 9), tamburica (11)
- Nate Walcott – trumpet (track 11)
- Harrison Whitford – acoustic guitar (track 11)

Technical

- Tony Berg – production
- Pat Sullivan – mastering
- Will Maclellan – mixing, engineering
- Nana Adjoa – engineering
- Amber Bain – background vocal arrangement (track 4)

Visuals

- Catherine Opie – cover photography
- Moira Barrett – quilt design
- Alexa Terfloth – still life photography, design
- Nick Scott – art direction

== Charts ==
Chart performance for What a Relief
| Chart (2024) | Peak position |
|---|---|
| Scottish Albums (Official Charts) | 51 |
| UK Albums Sales (OCC) | 43 |
| UK Americana Albums (Official Charts) | 7 |
| UK Independent Albums (Official Charts) | 17 |
