= Katie Gavin =

American singer-songwriter (born 1992)

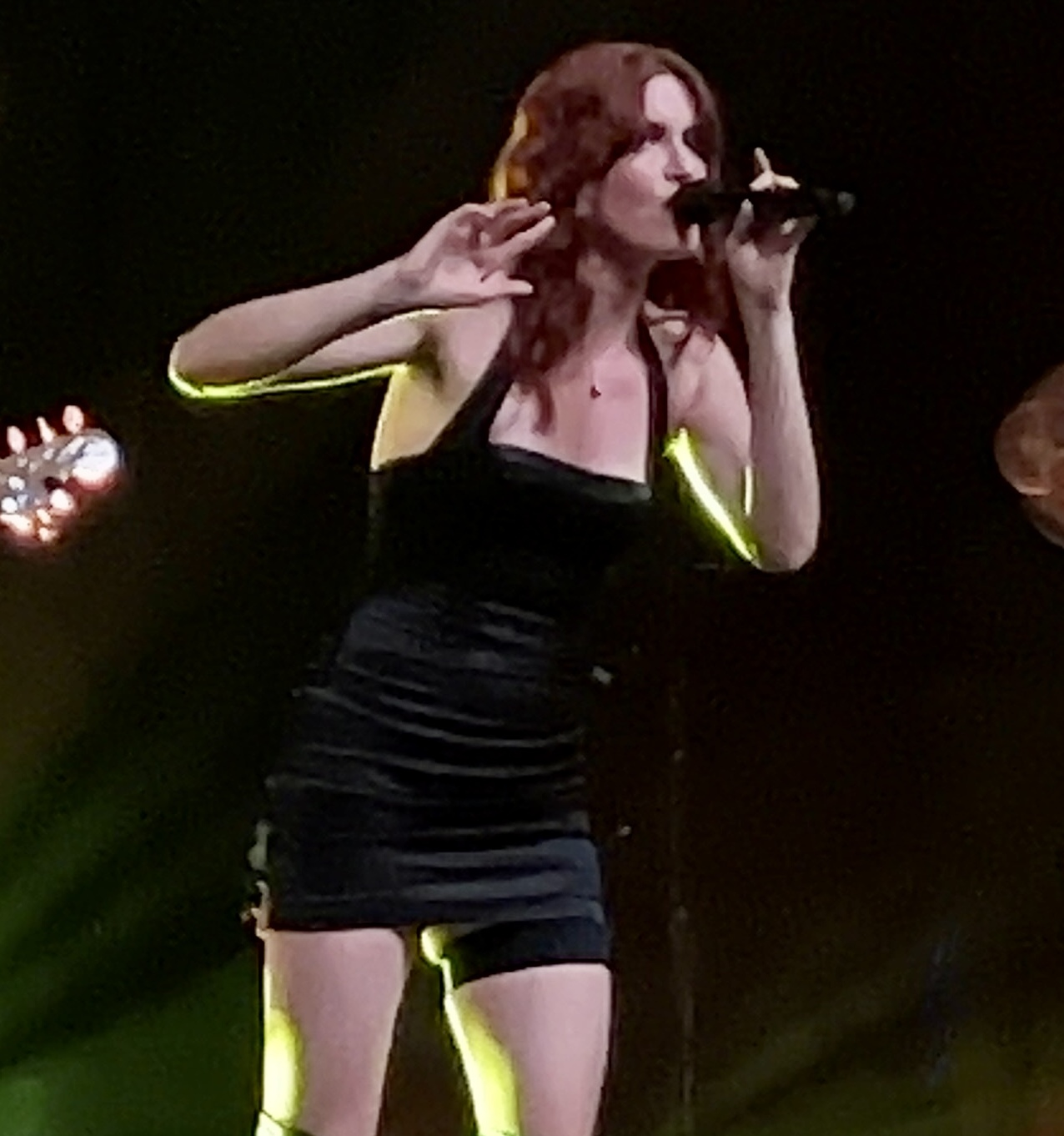
- Gavin in 2022

Background information
- Born: Catherine Hope Gavin; December 30, 1992 (age 33); Chicago, Illinois, US
- Origin: Winnetka, Illinois, US
- Genres: Various
- Instruments: Guitar; keyboards; piano; violin; shruti box
- Years active: 2009–present
- Label: Saddest Factory
- Member of: MUNA

Catherine Hope Gavin (born December 30, 1992) is an American singer-songwriter from Winnetka, Illinois who is best known as the lead vocalist and principal lyricist for the band MUNA since 2013.

Gavin began her career as a solo artist in 2009 when she began publishing home recordings of her own compositions on SoundCloud and occasionally performing live in Greater Chicago. After moving to Los Angeles in 2013, she formed MUNA with her then-classmates Josette Maskin and Naomi McPherson at the University of Southern California. The band has released four studio albums: About U (2017), Saves the World (2019), Muna (2022), and Dancing on the Wall (2026). In October 2024, Gavin released her debut solo album, What a Relief, through Saddest Factory Records.

== Early life and education ==
Gavin attended New Trier High School, graduating in 2011.

While attending New Trier, Gavin posted a cover of Willow Smith's "Whip My Hair", which went viral.

She spent a year at New York University before transferring to the University of Southern California, where she graduated with a degree in Music.

== Career ==
In 2013, Gavin met Naomi McPherson and Josette Maskin at USC, where they formed the band MUNA. She has released four studio albums with MUNA.

In 2024, Gavin announced her debut full-length solo album, What a Relief, which was released on October 25, 2024, through Phoebe Bridgers' record label Saddest Factory Records. Prior to the album release, she released three singles "Aftertaste", "Casual Drug Use" and "Inconsolable". She described the album as " "Lilith Fair-core," and cited Alanis Morissette, Fiona Apple and Ani DiFranco. She embarked on a sold-out solo tour in the fall of 2024, and opened for Bleachers at the Greek Theatre. She was one of the opening acts for Lucy Dacus on her "Forever is a Feeling" tour.

== Personal life ==
Gavin is a lesbian. She was in a relationship with MUNA bandmate Naomi McPherson for three years. She is neurodivergent, and has struggled with depression, anxiety, and addiction. She comes from an Irish Catholic background.

== Discography ==
=== Studio albums ===
- What a Relief (2024)

=== With MUNA ===
- About U (2017)
- Saves the World (2019)
- Muna (2022)
- Dancing on the Wall (2026)
