= Social Lubrication =

Studio album by Dream Wife
- Released: 9 June 2023
- Length: 38:37
- Label: Lucky Number
- Producer: Alice Go

Dream Wife chronology
So When You Gonna... (2020)	Social Lubrication (2023)

Singles from Social Lubrication
- 1. "Hot (Don't Date a Musician)" Released: 7 February 2023

Social Lubrication is the third studio album by British punk rock band Dream Wife, released through Lucky Number on 9 June 2023. It was produced by Alice Go and preceded by the single "Hot (Don't Date a Musician)".

== Critical reception ==
Professional ratings
Aggregate scores
Source	Rating
AnyDecentMusic?	7.9/10
Metacritic	82/100
Review scores
Source	Rating
AllMusic	4/5 stars
The Arts Desk	4/5 stars
Clash	7/10
DIY	4.5/5 stars
Dork	5/5 stars
The Line of Best Fit	7/10
Louder	4/5 stars

Social Lubrication received a score of 82 out of 100 on review aggregator Metacritic based on four critics' reviews, indicating "universal acclaim". Luke Winstanley of Clash wrote that the album "carries all the raw, essential components of what make Dream Wife such a well celebrated act while remaining remarkably self-assured and polished, even if the trio don't greatly expand on their recognised formula". Heather Phares of AllMusic opined that Social Lubrication "puts the trio's rock first" and on the album, the band are "more confidently plain-spoken than ever before in calling out injustices, oppressors, and passive bystanders", calling it "the work of a band that believes music can actually make a difference, and in Dream Wife's hands, it's a feeling that's contagious".

Reviewing the album for DIY, Emma Swann felt that Social Lubrication "sees the trio loosening up and letting go, resulting in a record that's both a progression, and that shows off wonderfully just what made them so exciting to begin with". Cheri Amour of The Arts Desk wrote that the band's "unwavering focus remains: rock and roll with a political punch" and that they are "here to make the political playful[,] powered by punk". Jamie MacMillan of Dork described the album as the band's "ripping third record" on which they "hit the reset button and aim to capture [their] live power and connection like never before" and felt that it "finally matches up to the reputation and explosive sound of one of the finest live bands of this generation".

Vicky Greer of Louder found that the album "takes [Dream Wife] to bold new places, pushing the boundaries of genre and influences with the maturity and polish of a band who have been around for decades", on which they are "living their best, most authentic lives, and having a blast while doing so". Kate Crudgington of The Line of Best Fit remarked that Social Lubrication is "notably noisier than their second offering" and goes "for the patriarchal jugular. From the thudding beats and rolling riffs of opener 'Kick in the Teeth' to slower, more sultry offerings like the penultimate 'Honestly', the trio target, tear down, and laugh in the face of adversity". Poetic Justice noted Social Lubrication is "raucous and energetic", with a strong sense of humour.

== Track listing ==
Social Lubrication track listing
No.	Title	Length
1.	"Kick in the Teeth"	3:19
2.	"Who Do You Wanna Be?"	3:49
3.	"Hot (Don't Date a Musician)"	3:35
4.	"Social Lubrication"	3:28
5.	"Mascara"	5:18
6.	"Leech"	5:10
7.	"I Want You"	1:57
8.	"Curious"	4:11
9.	"Honestly"	4:18
10.	"Orbit"	3:32
Total length:		38:37

== Charts ==
Chart performance for Social Lubrication
Chart (2023)	Peak position
Scottish Albums (OCC)	19
UK Albums (OCC)	73
UK Independent Albums (OCC)	10
