= Parasites & Butterflies =

Studio album by Nova Twins
- Released: 29 August 2025
- Genre: Alternative rock; punk rock; rap rock
- Length: 36:33
- Label: Marshall
- Producer: Rich Costey; Nova Twins

Nova Twins chronology
Supernova (2022)	Parasites & Butterflies (2025)

Singles from Parasites & Butterflies
- 1. "Monsters" Released: January 2025; 2. "Soprano" Released: March 2025; 3. "N.O.V.A." Released: July 2025

Parasites & Butterflies is the third studio album by British rock duo Nova Twins, released 29 August 2025 by Marshall Records. The album was preceded by the singles "Monster" in January 2025, followed by "Soprano" and "N.O.V.A."

== Background and production ==
Nova Twins members Amy Love and Georgia South relocated to Vermont in the United States to record Parasites & Butterflies in a relaxed environment, though they had written the album's songs relatively quickly. It is their first album to be produced by Rich Costey. Some of the album's themes were inspired by witnessing a solar eclipse in Vermont.

Singles from the album were released considerably earlier than the album, starting with "Monsters", which addresses mental health issues, in January 2025. "Soprano", about the experiences of women in the music industry, and "N.O.V.A.", a celebration of the duo's identities as women of color, were released as singles in the following months.

Love and South described the album as a "bridge between chaos and beauty" with the intention to "to showcase something deeply human: how vulnerability can be as empowering as it is revealing in its honesty. By playing with opposites, light and shade, you can feel a contrast throughout the album." The duo wrote the album's songs quickly in the interests of replicating their live sound, immediately after the conclusion of touring for their previous album Supernova, and many of the lyrics are informed by their experiences as touring musicians over the previous few years.

== Critical reception ==
Professional ratings
Aggregate scores
Source	Rating
Metacritic	75/100
Review scores
Source	Rating
The Arts Desk	3/5 stars
Clash	7/10
DIY	3.5/5 stars
Dork	5/5 stars
The Guardian	4/5 stars
Hot Press	7/10
Kerrang!	4/5
Metal Hammer	4/5 stars
New Noise Magazine	4/5 stars
PopMatters	6/10

On review aggregator website Metacritic, Parasites & Butterflies holds a score of 75 out of 100, based on reviews from six critics, which indicates "generally favorable reviews". Kerrang! called the album "stunning" and praised how it "weave[s] between outrageously distorted and serene soundscapes." The magazine also noted Love's experimentation with vocal styles and South's innovative bass techniques. Metal Hammer made note of the album's lyrical themes juxtaposing chaos and beauty, and also praised South's innovative bass techniques.

The Soundboard praised Nova Twins as "a defiantly individualistic entity in working a breed of rock music made to feel all their own" and concluded that Parasites and Butterflies benefits from Amy Love's use of many different vocal styles and the duo's confidence and colorful personalities. Melodic Magazine wrote that the album "portrays Nova Twins at their most human level — but the music is more visceral than ever before."

Clash Magazine issued a partially mixed review, noting that "the concept of Parasites and Butterflies is stronger than its execution, [but] this is still a stellar outing for Nova Twins, once more establishing themselves as a vital and thrilling voice in the rock scene." PopMatters also had some qualms about the album, noting that Nova Twins' rock influences appear to be limited to early-2000s nu metal, which restricts the creativity of some of their riffs, and concluding that "If the duo’s guitar and bass work catch up to the inventiveness of their vocals and ear for beats, they could truly produce some special music."

== Track listing ==
All lyrics are written by Amy Love; all music is composed by Amy Love and Georgia South.

Parasites & Butterflies track listing
No.	Title	Length
1.	"Glory"	3:42
2.	"Piranha"	2:49
3.	"Monsters"	3:32
4.	"Soprano"	2:14
5.	"Drip"	2:59
6.	"N.O.V.A."	2:41
7.	"Sandman"	2:30
8.	"Hummingbird"	4:08
9.	"Parallel Universe"	3:46
10.	"Hide & Seek"	2:59
11.	"Hurricane"	2:52
12.	"Black Roses"	2:31
Total length:		36:33

== Personnel ==
Credits adapted from Tidal.

=== Nova Twins ===
- Amy Love – guitars, lead vocals, backing vocals, drums (tracks 1, 3–12)
- Georgia South – bass, drums, backing vocals (6, 8, 10)

=== Additional contributors ===
- Nova Twins – production
- Rich Costey – production
- Romesh Dodangoda – mixing, immersive engineering, post-production
- Jeff Citron – engineering
- Adam Beer – engineering (6–8, 11); immersive mixing, immersive mastering, immersive engineering (all tracks)
- Martin Cooke – engineering (1–3, 9, 10, 12)
- Davide Ruffini – engineering (4, 5, 7)
- Joseph Rodgers – engineering (6–8, 11)
- Dick Beetham – mastering
- Jordan Powell – mixing assistance
- Tom Cory – mixing assistance
- Oliver Brightman – engineering assistance (6–8, 11)
- Ilan Rubin – drums (1–3, 9, 10, 12)
- William South – organ (1)
- George MacDonald – drums (3), percussion (10, 11)
- Zep – drums (4, 5, 7)
- Jake Woodward – drums (6–8, 11)
- Noli Olusanya – viola, violin (8)

== Charts ==
Chart performance for Parasites & Butterflies
Chart (2025)	Peak position
Scottish Albums (OCC)	10
UK Albums (OCC)	27
UK Independent Albums (OCC)	4
UK Rock & Metal Albums (OCC)	1
