= Dream Wife (album) =

Studio album by Dream Wife
- Released: 26 January 2018
- Genre: Punk rock; indie rock; indie pop
- Length: 34:48
- Label: Lucky Number
- Producer: Oliver Wright; Peter Jarrett

Dream Wife chronology
Dream Wife (2018)	So When You Gonna... (2020)

Singles from Dream Wife
- 1. "F.U.U." Released: 28 October 2016; 2. "Somebody" Released: 8 March 2017; 3. "Fire" Released: 15 August 2017; 4. "Let's Make Out" Released: 25 October 2017

Dream Wife is the debut studio album by the British punk rock band Dream Wife, released via Lucky Number in January 2018.

== Release ==
On 28 October 2016, the band released the first single from the album, "F.U.U." The music video to the single was released on 8 March 2018, and features Fever Dream and directed by Aidan Zamiri.

On 31 January 2017, Dream Wife explained they were halfway to completing their debut album, while recording it at a studio in Notting Hill.

The second single "Somebody" was announced on 8 March 2017. The band described the single as "a conversation on the reclamation of bodies by the women who occupy them in a tender, yet direct, and empowering way". The music video to the single was released on 29 March 2017, and was directed by John Podpadec and filmed in Wedmore.

On 15 August 2017, the third single "Fire" was announced. The music video for the single was released on 6 September 2017. The single was made into an EP on 27 September 2017, which got rave reviews from critics.

On 25 October 2017, Dream Wife announced the release of their new album, along with the fourth single "Let's Make Out".

== Critical reception ==
Professional ratings
Aggregate scores
Source	Rating
AnyDecentMusic?	7.7/10
Metacritic	77/100
Review scores
Source	Rating
AllMusic	4/5 stars
Clash	7/10
DIY	4/5 stars
Drowned in Sound	8/10
NME	5/5 stars
Pitchfork	6.7/10
Q	3/5 stars
Record Collector	4/5 stars
The Skinny	4/5 stars
Uncut	7/10

Upon its release, Dream Wife received "generally favorable reviews" according to Metacritic who gave the album a score of 77/100 based on 16 reviews from critics. Aggregator Album of the Year gave the release an 81 out of 100 based on a critical consensus of 22 reviews.

=== Accolades ===
Accolades for Dream Wife
Publication	Accolade	Rank
God Is in the TV	God Is in the TV's Top 100 Albums of 2018	18
The Line of Best Fit	The Line of Best Fit's Top 50 Albums of 2018	36
MusicOMH	MusicOMH's Top 50 Albums of 2018	28
NME	NME's Top 100 Albums of 2018	13
NME	NME's Top 25 Albums of 2018 – Mid-Year	2
The Skinny	The Skinny's Top 50 Albums of 2018	14
Upset Magazine	Upset Magazine's Top 10 Albums of 2018	6

== Track listing ==
Dream Wife track listing
No.	Title	Length
1.	"Let's Make Out"	2:56
2.	"Somebody"	3:30
3.	"Fire"	3:33
4.	"Hey Heartbreaker"	3:20
5.	"Love Without Reason"	3:19
6.	"Kids"	4:00
7.	"Taste"	2:46
8.	"Act My Age"	2:22
9.	"Right Now"	2:29
10.	"Spend the Night"	2:40
11.	"F.U.U" (featuring Fever Dream)	3:50
Total length:		34:48

== Personnel ==
- Rakel Mjöll Leifsdóttir – lead vocals
- Alice Gough – guitar, vocals
- Isabella Podpadec – bass, vocals
- Alex Paveley – drums (tracks 1–4 and 6–11)
- Paeris Giles – drums (track 5)
- Fever Dream – co-lead vocals (track 11)
- Oliver Wright – production, mixing
- Peter Jarrett – production, mixing
- Steven Ansell – additional drum recording (track 5)
- Ione Gamble – artwork
- Cady Siregar – artwork assistant
- Tim Hampson – artwork assistant
- Hollie Fernando – photography
- Elizabeth Gabrielle Lee – photography
- Jender Anomie – photography

== Charts ==
Chart performance for Dream Wife
Chart (2018)	Peak position
Scottish Albums (OCC)	74
UK Albums (OCC)	60
UK Independent Albums (OCC)	11
