= Life's So Fun Tour =

2023 concert tour by Muna

- Tour by Muna
- Location: North America; Europe
- Associated album: Muna
- Start date: April 14, 2023
- End date: October 12, 2023
- Legs: 3
- No. of shows: 21 in North America; 7 in Europe; 27 in total
- Supporting acts: Nova Twins; Lou Roy; Meet Me at the Altar

Muna concert chronology
- 2022 North America & UK Tour (2022); Life's So Fun Tour (2023); ...

The Life's So Fun Tour is the fourth major headlining concert tour by American indie pop band Muna. The tour supports their third studio album Muna (2022). The tour began at the Empire Polo Club in Indio on April 14, 2023, and concluded at Greek Theatre in Los Angeles on October 12, 2023.

== Background ==
In January 2023, Muna announced that they would be embarking on a second headlining tour consisting of 14 dates in support of their third self-titled album. Following their announcement it was then announced that they would be playing Coachella. Previously, it had been announced that Muna would also be opening for Taylor Swift for her Eras Tour as well as boygenius for their headlining tour. In April 2023 it was announced that Muna would play All Things Go in Baltimore, Maryland and in May 2023, they announced they would be headlining Treeline Festival in Columbia, Missouri.

== Set list ==
This setlist is representative of the show on April 19, 2023, in San Francisco. It is not intended to represent all shows from the tour.

1. "What I Want"
2. "Number One Fan"
3. "Solid"
4. "Stayaway"
5. "Runner's High"
6. "So Special"
7. "No Idea"
8. "Loose Garment"
9. "Winterbreak"
10. "Kind of Girl"
11. "Taken"
12. "Pink Light"
13. "Around U"
14. "Crying on the Bathroom Floor"
15. "Home by Now"
16. "Anything but Me"
17. "One That Got Away"

Encore

18. "I Know a Place"
19. "Silk Chiffon"

=== Notes ===
- During the May 9, 2023, show at Terminal 5 in New York City, Lorde performed "Silk Chiffon" with Muna.

== Tour dates ==
List of concerts, showing date, city, country, venue, and opening act
Date	City	Country	Venue	Opening act(s)
Leg 1 – North America
April 14, 2023 (Note: The shows on April 14 and 21, 2023 were part of Coachella 2023.)	Indio	United States	Empire Polo Club	—N/a
April 17, 2023	Seattle	United States	Showbox SoDo	Nova Twins
April 19, 2023	San Francisco	United States	Warfield Theatre	Nova Twins
April 20, 2023	Pomona	United States	The Glass House	Nova Twins
April 21, 2023	Indio	United States	Empire Polo Club	—N/a
April 26, 2023	Austin	United States	Stubb's Waller Creek Amphitheater	Nova Twins
April 28, 2023	Atlanta	United States	Tabernacle	Nova Twins
April 29, 2023	Charlotte	United States	The Fillmore	Nova Twins
May 5, 2023	Philadelphia	United States	The Met Philadelphia	Nova Twins
May 6, 2023	Boston	United States	Roadrunner	Nova Twins
May 8, 2023	New York City	United States	Terminal 5	Nova Twins
May 9, 2023	New York City	United States	Terminal 5	Lou Roy
May 12, 2023	Washington D.C.	United States	The Anthem	Nova Twins
May 13, 2023	Harrisburg	United States	XL Live	Nova Twins
May 14, 2023	Toronto	Canada	History	Nova Twins
May 16, 2023	Chicago	United States	The Salt Shed	Nova Twins
May 17, 2023	St. Paul	United States	Palace Theatre	Nova Twins
May 19, 2023	Denver	United States	Mission Ballroom	Nova Twins
June 16, 2023 (Note: The June 16, 2023, show was part of Bonnaroo Music+Arts Festival.)	Manchester	United States	Great Stage Park	—N/a
Leg 2 – Europe
August 18, 2023 (Note: The August 18, 2023, show was part of Lowlands Festival.)	Biddinghuizen	Netherlands	Evenemententerrein Walibi	—N/a
August 22, 2023	Oxford	England	O2 Academy Oxford	Meet Me @ The Altar
August 23, 2023	Liverpool	England	O2 Academy Liverpool	Meet Me @ The Altar
August 25, 2023 (Note: The August 25, 2023, show was part of Reading and Leeds Festival.)	Leeds	England	Bramham Park	—N/a
August 26, 2023 (Note: The August 26, 2023, show was part of Connect Music Festival.)	Edinburgh	Scotland	Liquid Room	
August 27, 2023 (Note: The August 27, 2023, show was part of Reading and Leeds Festival.)	Reading	England	Little John's Farm	
August 30, 2023	Belfast	Northern Ireland	Limelight 1	—N/a
Leg 3 – North America
October 1, 2023 (Note: The October 1, 2023, show was part of All Things Go Fall Classic.)	Columbia	United States	Merriweather Post Pavilion	—N/a
October 12, 2023	Los Angeles	United States	Greek Theatre	Blondshell & Zselsa Hemlocke Springs
