= Saves the World =

Studio album by Muna
- Released: September 6, 2019
- Genres: Indie pop; synth-pop; electropop; power pop; alternative rock; synth-rock
- Length: 43:50
- Label: RCA
- Producers: Mike Crossey; John Hill; Muna

Muna chronology
About U (2017)	Saves the World (2019)	Muna (2022)

Singles from Saves the World
- 1. "Number One Fan" Released: June 7, 2019; 2. "Who" Released: June 28, 2019; 3. "Stayaway" Released: August 16, 2019; 4. "Taken" Released: September 5, 2019

Professional ratings
Aggregate scores
Source	Rating
AnyDecentMusic?	7.6/10
Metacritic	82/100
Review scores
Source	Rating
AllMusic	3/5 stars
Clash	9/10
DIY	4/5 stars
Dork	5/5 stars
The Independent	5/5 stars
NME	4/5 stars
Pitchfork	7.7/10
Q	4/5 stars
Rolling Stone	4/5 stars

Saves the World is the second studio album by American band Muna, released through RCA Records on September 6, 2019. The album was promoted by the singles "Number One Fan", "Who", "Stayaway", and "Taken", receiving positive reviews.

== Background ==
After supporting English singer Harry Styles during his 2017–2018 tour, the band took a hiatus until lead singer Katie Gavin concocted the opening verse of the song "Number One Fan" six months later, starting the album's songwriting process. According to guitarist Josette Maskin, the album title represents the band's belief that "saving yourself is the key to saving the world". Maskin also said Saves the World was meant to evoke optimism in listeners.

== Music and lyrics ==
Saves the World is a pop, alternative rock, synth-rock, indie pop, synth-pop, electropop, alt-pop, and power pop album. Thematically autobiographical, Saves the World has been described as "an emotional excavation." Its lyrics depict explorations of "addiction", "alienation", "romantic desolation", and "cycles of abusive behavior". The band approached the album with the intention of crafting a minimalist sound, with musically shorter sentences in comparison to those in their first album.

== Release and promotion ==
"Number One Fan" was released as the lead single from the album on June 7, 2019, followed by the releases of "Who" and "Stayaway" on June 28 and August 16, respectively. Saves the World was released on September 6, 2019. Muna embarked on a tour within the United States from September to October 2019 in promotion of the album.

== Critical reception ==
Saves the World garnered "rave reviews" upon its release. At Metacritic, which assigns a normalized rating out of 100 to reviews from mainstream critics, the album holds an average score of 82 based on eight reviews, indicating "universal acclaim".

In a perfect five-star review, Alexandra Pollard of The Independent asserted that Saves the World set up the band to joining "the ranks of those who have brazenly borrowed their sound". In the same vein, Abigail Firth of Dork praised that the album "is tears under the disco ball at its finest" and "a more honest and grown-up version of the MUNA we know". Rolling Stone's Jonathan Bernstein awarded the album four stars out of five and praised its "concise and clever" yet "never overly precious" songwriting. Writing for Pitchfork, Eve Barlow highlighted how the album was "as sentimental as it is versatile". Marcy Donelson of AllMusic commented that while the album's lyrics were more effective than its hooks, it contained "a handful of low-key anthems".

Saves the World placed on several critics' lists of the best albums of 2019. It was ranked as the 41st best by Billboard, the 33rd by The Guardian, the 15th by The Independent and included on an unranked list by Paper.

== Track listing ==
All lyrics are written by Katie Gavin; all music is composed by Josette Maskin, Gavin, Naomi McPherson

No.	Title	Producer(s)	Length
1.	"Grow"	Muna	1:47
2.	"Number One Fan"	Mike Crossey; Muna	3:25
3.	"Stayaway"	John Hill; Muna	3:31
4.	"Who"	Crossey; Muna	3:08
5.	"Navy Blue"	Crossey; Muna	3:58
6.	"Never"	Crossey; Muna	4:03
7.	"Pink Light"	Crossey; Muna	4:11
8.	"Taken"	Muna	4:05
9.	"Hands Off"	Crossey; Muna	3:39
10.	"Good News (Ya-Ya Song)"	Crossey; Muna	4:10
11.	"Memento"	Muna	2:01
12.	"It's Gonna Be Okay, Baby"	Muna	5:44
Total length:			43:50

== Personnel ==
MUNA

- Katie Gavin – vocals, piano ("Grow")
- Josette Maskin – backing vocals, guitars
- Naomi McPherson – backing vocals, guitars, synthesizers, piano ("Grow"), mandolin ("Taken")

Guest musicians

- Brian Robert Jones – bass (except "Grow", "Taken", "Memento", "It's Gonna Be Okay, Baby")
- Scott Heiner – drums, percussion (except "Grow", "Taken", "Memento", "It's Gonna Be Okay, Baby")
- Mike Crossey – additional programming ("Grow")

== Charts ==
Chart performance for Saves the World
Chart (2019)	Peak position
Scottish Albums (Official Charts)	34
US Heatseekers Albums (Billboard)	7

== Release history ==
Release history and formats for Saves the World
Region	Date	Format	Label	Ref.
Various	September 6, 2019	Digital download; streaming	RCA	
