= Dream Wife (band) =

English band

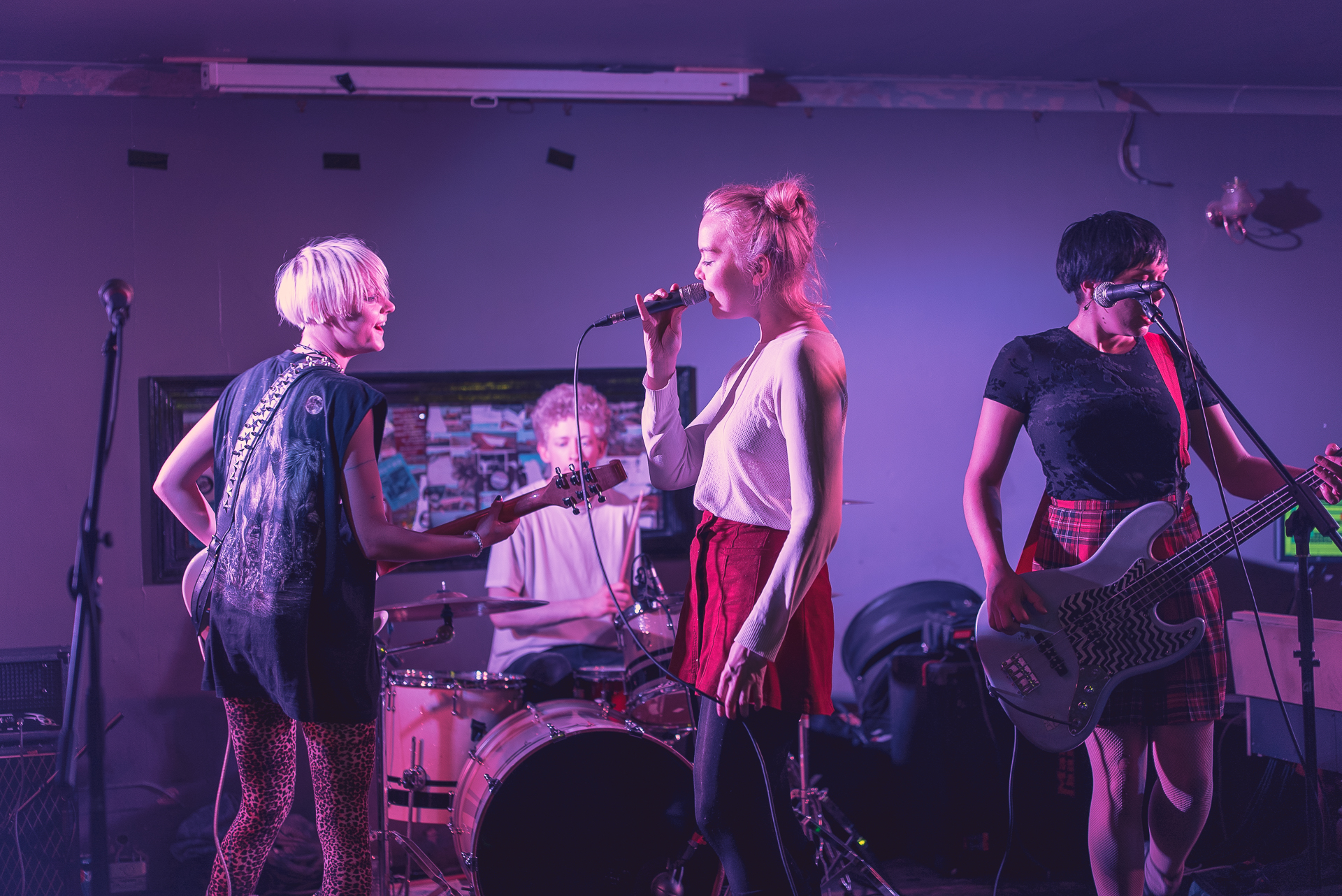

Background information
- Origin: Brighton, England
- Genres: Pop-punk; indie rock
- Years active: 2016–present
- Label: Lucky Number
- Members: Alice Go; Rakel Mjöll; Bella Podpadec; Alex Paveley
- Website: dreamwife.co

Dream Wife is an English-Icelandic, London-based band, whose sound is a mixture of punk rock, pop music and indie rock. The band consists of Rakel Mjöll (lead vocals), Alice Go (guitar, vocals), Bella Podpadec (bass, vocals), and Alex Paveley on drums.

In 2018, the band was included on Rolling Stone magazine's list of "The 13 Best Things We Saw" at that year's Lollapalooza music festival. Kev Geoghegan and Paul Glynn of BBC Music called Dream Wife "a jaw-dropping live act and one of the most talked-about new bands of 2018." Joe Lynch of Billboard wrote "Dream Wife are inarguably one of the most exhilarating live rock bands to emerge within the last few years."

== History ==
=== Early years ===
Lead vocalist Rakel Mjöll Leifsdottir (born December 16, 1989). was born in Iceland and spent eight years of her childhood living in Santa Clara and San Jose, California. She also trained in jazz and opera as a teenager in Reykjavík. Somerset-raised bassist Bella Podpadec (b. 1992 or 1993) met guitarist Alice Go (b. 1992 or 1993) at a Mid-Somerset Battle of the Bands. The two women, and Bella who is non-binary, went on to attend Brighton University and in 2014 they formed the band as an art school performance project. The trio had the concept of forming a "fake girl band" and they recorded themselves composing the songs that they would eventually perform at an art gallery exhibition. The film was shot in a mockumentary style inspired by This Is Spinal Tap (1984). After graduation the band moved to London.

The band's lyrics often tackle issues related to feminism, gender roles, body image and sexual objectification. Members of the band have cited influences such as Be Your Own Pet, Sleigh Bells, Le Tigre, Debbie Harry, Grimes, David Bowie and Madonna. During their live shows the band are known to enact a "bitches-to-the-front" policy where they ask the audience to part in order to allow women who wish to mosh together to move closer to the front of the stage.

=== First commercial releases and tour ===
In 2016, the band released their first self-titled EP via Cannibal Hymns. The EP was recorded at Go's parents' home in Somerset with her father on drums. The following year they released another EP titled Fire. The title was in part inspired by the fact that all three band members were born under astrological fire signs—Mjöll and Go are Sagittarii and Podpadec is a Leo. That same year they toured Canada and performed at festivals such as the Iceland Airwaves festival in Reykjavík, as well as South by Southwest in Austin, Texas.

In 2018, they released their self-titled debut album to positive reviews: Joe Goggins of The Independent gave it 4 out of 5 stars and noted that "they released a self-titled debut record that doesn't for a second sound like a DIY endeavour; it's a polished, assured slice of melodic punk." Leonie Cooper of NME gave the album a 10 out of 10 and wrote: "God damn have we been waiting a long time for a band like Dream Wife." Emma Swann of DIY gave the album a 4 out of 5 rating and said: "Sometimes we get the bands we want: sometimes - like in the case of Dream Wife - they're also the bands we need.

The band followed their album release with an extensive tour of Europe and North America, opening for The Vaccines and the UK, Sunflower Bean during some of their US and Canadian shows, The Kills on some of the other US dates as well as opening for the band Garbage in the UK, Germany and France. That same year the band performed in several cities in Australia as part of the St Jerome's Laneway Festival. In late 2018, Dream Wife embarked on their first headlining tour in North America.

The band originally toured with a drum machine, but have since toured with drummer Alex Paveley.

=== Second album ===
In 2020, the band released their follow-up album So When You Gonna... to generally positive reviews. Helenia Wadia of the Evening Standard described it as "hearfelt and unapologetically outspoken." The album drew comparisons with several female-fronted bands such as the Yeah Yeah Yeahs. Music critic Robert Christgau applauded Mjöli's insight into sex and romance from the perspective of a "minor rock star", "from the male-bonding pissoff 'Sports!' – 'Time is money/Never apologize/These are the rules' – to a finale called 'After the Rain' where she both craves and rejects a tenderness that can only be provisional in a line of work that keeps her on the move."

== Discography ==
=== Studio albums ===
List of studio albums, with selected details and chart positions
Title	Album details	Peak chart positions				
Title	Album details	UK	UK Down.	UK Indie	UK Vinyl	SCO
Dream Wife	Released: 26 January 2018; Label: Lucky Number (#LUCKY112); Formats: CD, LP, download	60	56	11	5	74
So When You Gonna...	Released: 3 July 2020; Label: Lucky Number (#LUCKY141); Formats: CD, LP, download	18	5	2	3	5
Social Lubrication	Released: 9 June 2023; Label: Lucky Number (#LUCKY); Formats: CD, LP, download	73	33	10	7	19
"—" denotes items that did not chart or were not released in that territory.

=== Live album ===
- IRL (Live in London 2020) (2020)

=== Singles ===
List of singles, showing year released and album name
Title	Year	Album
"Hey Heartbreaker"	2016	Dream Wife
"F.U.U."	2016	Dream Wife
"Somebody"	2017	Dream Wife
"Fire"	2017	Dream Wife
"Let's Make Out"	2017	Dream Wife
"Sports!"	2020	So When You Gonna
"Hasta La Vista"	2020	So When You Gonna
"So When You Gonna"	2020	So When You Gonna
"After The Rain"	2020	So When You Gonna
"Leech"	2022	Social Lubrication
"Hot (Don't Date a Musician)"	2023	Social Lubrication
"Orbit"	2023	Social Lubrication
"Who Do You Wanna Be"	2023	Social Lubrication
"Social Lubrication"	2023	Social Lubrication
"Love You More"	2023	Non-album singles
"All the Things She Said"	2024	Non-album singles
"Room 341"	2024	Non-album singles
