= About U =

Studio album by Muna
- Released: February 3, 2017
- Genres: Dark-pop; synth-pop; dance-pop
- Length: 49:00
- Label: RCA
- Producer: Muna

Muna chronology
Loudspeaker (2016)	About U (2017)	Saves the World (2019)

Singles from About U
- 1. "Winterbreak" Released: February 19, 2016; 2. "Loudspeaker" Released: April 8, 2016; 3. "I Know a Place" Released: December 2, 2016; 4. "Crying on the Bathroom Floor" Released: January 20, 2017; 5. "If U Love Me Now" Released: February 2, 2017

Professional ratings
Review scores
Source	Rating
AllMusic	3/5 stars
DIY	4/5 stars
Sputnikmusic	3.5/5
The Line of Best Fit	9/10

About U is the debut studio album by American band Muna, released through RCA Records on February 3, 2017. It is a dark-pop, synth-pop, and dance-pop album influenced by '80s new wave.

== Background ==
"Winterbreak", the lead single from About U, was released on February 19, 2016. The track went on to peak at number 31 on the Billboard Hot Rock Songs chart. "Loudspeaker" followed as the second single on April 8, 2016. The release of "Loudspeaker" was accompanied by an EP of the same name, which included the title track, as well "So Special", "Winterbreak" and "Promise", all of which ended up on About U. They performed the song on The Tonight Show with Jimmy Fallon on November 4, 2016.

"I Know a Place" was released as the third single from the album on December 2, 2016. The song peaked at number 39 on the Adult Top 40 Airplay chart. The band performed the song on Jimmy Kimmel Live! on February 7, 2017 with new anti-Trump lyrics. "Crying on the Bathroom Floor" was released as the album's fourth single on January 20, 2017.

On March 9, 2018 the band released the EP About U: One Year On which featured acoustic versions of "Crying on the Bathroom Floor", "If U Love Me Now", and "I Know a Place".

== Critical reception ==
About U received critical acclaim upon release. Tim Sendra of AllMusic called the album "a promising debut" "with a pleasingly direct lyrical approach, very assured vocals, and enough songs with sharp enough hooks ("Loudspeaker"), emotional punches ("Winterbreak"), or both ("End of Desire") to make it worth the effort to check the record out." DIY's El Hunt called About U "an album that captures the soaring highs and plunging lows [of life], all in one brilliantly executed swoop." Pip Williams, writing for The Line of Best Fit praised the band for representing queer women in their songs, saying "its twelve tracks are an unflinching and unapologetic documentation of the LA trio's lives, and by extension the lives of so many queer women the world over. To hear our own lives reflected in music made by people like us is still devastatingly rare; and to hear a pop album openly mention queer sex in its opening track ("So Special") is even more so."

About U placed at number 41 on Billboard's list of the best albums of 2017 and the 20th best of the year by The Line of Best Fit.

== Track listing ==
All lyrics: © 2015-2016 Katie Gavin. All music is composed and produced by Josette Maskin, Gavin and Naomi McPherson.

About U track listing
No.	Title	Length
1.	"So Special"	3:57
2.	"Loudspeaker"	3:30
3.	"I Know A Place"	4:33
4.	"Winterbreak"	4:57
5.	"Around U"	5:13
6.	"After"	3:24
7.	"Promise"	3:58
8.	"If U Love Me Now"	4:14
9.	"Crying On The Bathroom Floor"	4:16
10.	"End Of Desire"	4:06
11.	"Everything"	4:07
12.	"Outro"	2:45
Total length:		49:00

== Charts ==
Chart performance for About U
Chart (2017)	Peak position
UK Album Downloads (Official Charts)	59
US Heatseekers Albums (Billboard)	7
