= Muna (Muna album) =

Studio album by Muna
- Released: June 24, 2022
- Genre: Synth-pop
- Length: 39:15
- Labels: Saddest Factory; Dead Oceans
- Producer: Muna

Muna chronology
Saves the World (2019)	Muna (2022)	Dancing on the Wall (2026)

Singles from Muna
- 1. "Silk Chiffon" Released: September 7, 2021; 2. "Anything but Me" Released: March 15, 2022; 3. "Kind of Girl" Released: April 28, 2022; 4. "Home by Now" Released: May 25, 2022; 5. "What I Want" Released: June 24, 2022

Muna is the third studio album by American indie pop band Muna, released on June 24, 2022. It is their first album as an independent artist, after they signed with Phoebe Bridgers' Saddest Factory Records imprint in 2021. It was promoted with the singles "Silk Chiffon", "Anything but Me", "Kind of Girl", "Home by Now" and "What I Want". The album was met with critical acclaim upon release and became the band's first-charting album on the US Billboard 200 and UK Albums Chart.

== Background ==
In 2020, Muna was dropped by RCA Records, with which they had released their first two albums, and in May 2021 signed with Saddest Factory Records, an imprint of Dead Oceans owned by American singer-songwriter Phoebe Bridgers. Throughout 2021 and 2022, Muna toured with Bridgers on her Reunion Tour and with Kacey Musgraves on her Star-Crossed: Unveiled tour.

Muna is primarily a synth-pop album, but according to lead singer Katie Gavin, "the sound of this record explodes in a ton of different directions". Guitarist Josette Maskin said of the album, "What ultimately keeps us together is knowing that someone's going to hear each one of these songs and use it to make a change they need in their life. That people are going to feel a kind of catharsis, even if it's a catharsis that I might never have known myself, because I'm fucked up."

== Release and promotion ==
"Silk Chiffon", featuring vocals from Phoebe Bridgers, was released as the album's lead single on September 7, 2021. The song is an ode to queer love, and accompanied by a music video paying homage to the 1999 film But I'm a Cheerleader. The song was sent to adult alternative radio on September 27, 2021, and hot adult contemporary radio on March 21, 2022. It received acclaim from critics. Muna performed the song on The Late Late Show with James Corden on November 8, 2021.

On March 15, 2022, Muna announced the album and released the single "Anything but Me", a song about "leaving a partnership simply because it doesn’t feel right." The song was sent to adult alternative radio on March 28, 2022. Muna performed the song on The Ellen DeGeneres Show on April 18, 2022.

"Kind of Girl" was released as the third single from the album on April 28, 2022. The song "explores the power of language and the words we use to describe who we are and who we want to be." The music video features the trio dressed in as cowboys to express the fluidity of gender. The fourth single, "Home by Now" was released on May 25, 2022.

The band embarked on a North American tour in support of the album, followed by nine dates in the UK. In March 2023, they performed at the Sydney WorldPride closing concert before supporting Lorde in her Solar Power Tour and in April 2023 they will continue into a second North American tour beginning with Coachella on April 14, 2023.

== Composition ==
Muna is primarily a synth-pop album influenced by new wave, disco, and hyperpop. "Silk Chiffon" and "Kind of Girl" are both country pop songs, with the former incorporating indie pop and bubblegum music, and the later interpolating Americana. "Anything but Me", "What I Want", and "Home by Now" are all electropop songs, with the latter fusing elements of dance music and emo. "Runner's High" is a disco song about self-care and grieving a break-up, with garage house-esque percussion and "hi-hats maintaining a staccato rhythm like a pattering heartbeat." "Solid" has a glam rock edge and "sparkles like the glitterball at an '80s prom". Album closer "Shooting Star" uses the titular phenomenon as a metaphor for destructive relationships, with "spacey synthesisers and underlying pulsating percussion that builds to coming-of-age-movie prog-rock guitar". Every song on the album begins with a quiet introduction that crescendos into the track, "gently easing the listener in rather than hitting them over the head".

== Critical reception ==
Professional ratings
Aggregate scores
Source	Rating
AnyDecentMusic?	8.2/10
Metacritic	82/100
Review scores
Source	Rating
Clash	9/10
DIY	4/5 stars
Dork	5/5 stars
Exclaim!	7/10
Gigwise	8/10 stars
The Line of Best Fit	10/10
Loud and Quiet	9/10
NME	4/5 stars
Pitchfork	7.8/10
Under the Radar	6.5/10 stars

MUNA was met with widespread acclaim upon release. At Metacritic, which assigns a normalized rating out of 100 to reviews from mainstream critics, the album holds an average score of 82 based on thirteen reviews, indicating "universal acclaim".

The Line of Best Fit critic David Cobbald gave the album a perfect score, saying "MUNA is all killer no filler. From its overall sound down to its finer details, Gavin, Maskin and McPherson have hit the mark completely. It's amazing to see a band that are so unapologetically queer excel at their craft and create an album that is quite possibly, if not certainly, their masterpiece." Susan Darlington, writing for Loud & Quiet praised the album's overtones of "musical brightness and self-acceptance". David Roskin of Gigwise praised the release, saying "With a collection of bangers, slow tunes and refreshing melodies, MUNA are magic. They've created a space for all to lose themselves into for a little while, whether to dance or cry, they're here to carve through the monotony and troubles of daily life and transport us to a different, brighter, louder, prouder, and safer place." Ben Tipple of DIY writes "It's by far the happiest MUNA have sounded; a celebratory expression of queer love that loses none of the trio’s magic." Exclaim! contributor Dede Akomo wrote that the trio "emits a monstrous amount of something our world lacks: queer joy. Generation Z is no longer satisfied with simply seeing queer characters suffer in their media, and MUNA represent the counteraction to this anguish." In a five star review, Stephen Ackroyd of Dork called the album "A record that doesn't just thrill, but empowers too, it's enough to put MUNA firmly amongst the highest echelon of modern pop bands. Quite possibly the album of the year so far."

== Track listing ==
All tracks written by Katie Gavin and produced by MUNA, except where noted.

No.	Title	Writer(s)	Producer(s)	Length
1.	"Silk Chiffon" (featuring Phoebe Bridgers)	Gavin; Daniel Tashian; Ian Fitchuk		3:26
2.	"What I Want"	Gavin; Leland	Naomi McPherson	4:03
3.	"Runner's High"			3:43
4.	"Home by Now"			4:28
5.	"Kind of Girl"			4:06
6.	"Handle Me"			3:39
7.	"No Idea"	Gavin; Mitski		2:54
8.	"Solid"		McPherson	2:21
9.	"Anything but Me"			3:33
10.	"Loose Garment"			3:10
11.	"Shooting Star"			3:52
Total length:				39:15

== Personnel ==
=== Muna ===
- Katie Gavin – lead & background vocals (all tracks), acoustic guitar (1, 5), tambourine (1)
- Josette Maskin – lead guitar (1, 4, 5, 9), acoustic guitar (5, 6, 10, 11), electric guitar (2, 3, 7, 8), nylon-string guitar (3), slide guitar (1, 5, 6, 11), Ebow (2, 4, 7, 11), guitar synthesizer (2, 4), synthesizer (3), organ (6), background vocals (1, 2, 6–8), bass programming (2), additional programming (3, 5)
- Naomi McPherson – rhythm guitar (1, 5, 9, 11), acoustic guitar (1, 5, 8), 12-string guitar (4, 6, 9, 11), mandolin (5), background vocals (1, 2, 4, 6–11), synthesizer (all tracks), synth-bass (3, 9, 10), drum programming (all tracks), bass programming (2, 4, 5, 7, 8), vocal programming (3, 4), string arrangement (11)

=== Other musicians ===
- Geo Botelho – bass (1, 6–8, 11), background vocals (1)
- Phoebe Bridgers – featured vocals (1)
- Luke Burgoyne – additional programming
- Dan Grech-Marguerat – additional programming
- Scott Heiner – drums (1, 6)
- Charles Haydon Hicks – additional programming
- Joy Oladokun – saxophone & trumpet (6, 10); horn arrangement (6, 10)
- Cynthia Tolson – violin, viola & cello (5, 10, 11); string arrangement (5, 10)

=== Technical ===
- Geo Botelho – engineer (1, 3–7, 9), vocal engineer (2, 8)
- Luke Burgoyne – assistant mixing engineer
- Katie Gavin – engineer (1–3, 5, 8, 9), vocal engineer (4, 7, 9–11)
- Dan Grech-Marguerat – mixing engineer
- Charles Haydon Hicks – assistant mixing engineer
- Josette Maskin – engineer (1–3, 5, 8–10)
- Naomi McPherson – engineer (1–3, 5, 8–10)
- Patricia Sullivan – mastering engineer

== Charts ==
Chart performance for Muna
Chart (2022)	Peak position
Australian Digital Albums (ARIA)	32
Australian Hitseekers Albums (ARIA)	5
Scottish Albums (Official Charts)	10
UK Albums (Official Charts)	61
UK Independent Albums (Official Charts)	4
US Billboard 200	188
US Heatseekers Albums (Billboard)	2
US Independent Albums (Billboard)	26
US Top Alternative Albums (Billboard)	21
