= Muna (band) =

American indie pop band

- MUNA participating in a Q&A and album playback for Rough Trade East, 2026.

Background information
- Origin: Los Angeles, California, U.S.
- Genres: Indie pop; synth-pop; electropop; dark pop; power pop
- Years active: 2013–present
- Labels: RCA; Saddest Factory; Dead Oceans
- Members: Katie Gavin; Josette Maskin; Naomi McPherson
- Website: whereismuna.com

Muna (stylized in all caps as MUNA; /ˈmuːnə/ MOON-ə) is an American indie pop band consisting of Katie Gavin, Josette Maskin, and Naomi McPherson. They released two studio albums with RCA Records, About U (2017) and Saves the World (2019), before signing with independent label Saddest Factory Records, which released their third studio album, Muna, in June 2022, and Dancing on the Wall in May 2026.

== Career ==
=== 2013–2019: Career beginnings, About U and Saves the World ===
Based in Los Angeles, the trio met in college at the University of Southern California and began working together in 2013 with Maskin and McPherson playing together on guitars and Gavin adding synth bass and vocals. Gavin had introduced McPherson to Maskin. Gavin and Maskin were music majors, while McPherson double-majored in narrative studies and American studies & ethnicity. The two guitarists, Maskin and McPherson, had been used to playing ska and progressive rock, but settled on a different sound when their initial collaboration with singer Gavin resulted in a pop song.

Beginning their collaboration in an experimental mode, they evolved towards hooky electronic pop. In the summer of 2014, they self-released their debut EP, More Perfect, on Bandcamp and SoundCloud. Its success led to their signing by RCA Records in the US and Columbia Records in the UK. Gavin and McPherson dated for three years and broke up shortly after being signed. RCA released their self-produced debut major label EP, Loudspeaker, in May 2016. Their debut full-length album, About U, was released on February 3, 2017.

Dutch DJ/producer Tiësto remixed "Winterbreak" in May 2016. Muna played Lollapalooza 2016 in Chicago in July 2016, toured America with Grouplove in the fall of 2016, and made their late-night network television debut on November 7, 2016, on The Tonight Show Starring Jimmy Fallon. In June 2017, it was announced that the band would be the opening act on the North American and European tour dates for Harry Styles. In 2017, their song "I Know a Place" was featured in The Carmilla Movie, following the original web series based on Sheridan Le Fanu's novella of the same name. In 2018, Muna was featured playing "I Know a Place" live in the Netflix movie Alex Strangelove, which chronicles the sexual awakening of teen protagonist Alex Truelove.

In 2018, the band began work on their second full-length record. In June 2019, the band announced their second album, Saves the World, which was released on September 6, 2019. The album was preceded by its lead single, "Number One Fan", followed by the singles "Who", "Stayaway", and "Taken". Following their London shows at the Village Underground, it was announced that Muna would be returning to the UK for their Saves the World Tour in December 2019.

=== 2020–2024: Record label change and Muna ===
In 2020, shortly after the onset of the COVID-19 pandemic, Muna was dropped by RCA for "not making enough money". It was then announced in May 2021 that Muna had signed with Saddest Factory Records, the record label founded by Phoebe Bridgers, which operates in partnership with Secretly Group's Dead Oceans. In September 2021, Muna released their single "Silk Chiffon" featuring Bridgers, their first since signing to the label. Rolling Stone called it a "buoyant track with an uncharacteristically bright declaration of queer love". The "Silk Chiffon" music video featuring Phoebe Bridgers is a tribute to the themes and visuals of the 1990s film But I'm a Cheerleader. Band member Naomi McPherson said it is "a song for kids to have their first gay kiss to". The song was chosen by a number of publications for their year-end lists of 2021, including Rolling Stone, Consequence of Sound, and The Line of Best Fit, who ranked it at number one. Muna later joined Kacey Musgraves on her 15-city winter tour between January and February 2022.

In March 2022, the band released the single "Anything But Me", and announced that their third studio album, Muna, would be released on June 24, 2022, through Saddest Factory and Dead Oceans. The following month, they performed the single on the final season of The Ellen DeGeneres Show. The album's third single, "Kind of Girl", was released in April 2022, alongside a Western-inspired music video where the trio plays "with the gendered nature of the song". The band performed the song on The Tonight Show Starring Jimmy Fallon the following month. Their self-titled album Muna is acclaimed by music critics, who have scored it as the band's highest-rated album, according to media aggregate site Metacritic. It became the band's first charting album on multiple lists, including the UK Albums Chart, US Billboard 200, and others in Australia and Scotland. The album's fourth single, "What I Want", was released on the same day as Muna, with an accompanying music video. The trio also released their cover of "Sometimes" (1999) by Britney Spears for the Hulu LGBTQ American romantic comedy film Fire Island in June 2022.

In March 2023, Muna performed to a sold-out crowd of 15,000 people at the closing ceremony of WorldPride Sydney, alongside Ava Max and Kim Petras. Later that month, Muna was an opening act on selected Australian dates of Lorde's Solar Power Tour. In April 2023, the band performed their first set at Coachella. Shortly after, Muna released a new single, "One That Got Away", alongside a music video inspired by a "criminal underworld". Muna was also an opening act on selected June through July 2023 US dates of Taylor Swift's The Eras Tour. Muna wrapped up the last leg of their Life's So Fun Tour in October 2023 with two sold-out shows at the Greek Theatre in Los Angeles. In June 2024, the band released a live album of the performance, titled Live at The Greek Theatre in Los Angeles. During 2024, Katie Gavin worked on her debut solo album, What A Relief, still on Phoebe Bridgers' Saddest Factory Records label. In July, Muna appeared at the Pitchfork Music Festival, performing "Ironic" with Alanis Morissette.

=== 2026–present: Dancing on the Wall ===
On February 10, 2026, the band announced their fourth album, Dancing on the Wall, and released the title track as its lead single. On March 17, they released the second single from the album, "So What". On April 14, they released the third single "Wannabeher".The album released on May 8, 2026.

== Artistry ==
All three members identify as queer and McPherson is non-binary. Initially wary of being pigeonholed as a "queer band", Muna later came to embrace the opportunity to use their musical fame to help inspire younger people to be comfortable with their identities. Their songs frequently address issues of sexuality and gender. They describe one early song, "So Special", as "an anthem for the slut-shamed girls of the world who have to assert their own value." According to McPherson, "It would have meant a lot to me when I was, say, 12, to know of someone in a band and think they were cool and know they were out." McPherson added, "I am out and I feel safe being out because the three of us are a little army for one another. I don't feel afraid to be myself. That makes me proud to be queer. That's the whole point of why we do this. We want a safe haven."

When asked the meaning behind the band name, the members state it has many different meanings and it has grown to "an entity greater than all of us individually". They cite many different languages having different translations of the word, having originally brainstormed it without much ceremony.

== Awards and honors ==
In June 2020, in honor of the 50th anniversary of the first LGBTQ pride parade, Queerty named Muna among the fifty heroes "leading the nation toward equality, acceptance, and dignity for all people".

== Podcast ==
In June 2021, the members of Muna began hosting a podcast called Gayotic, as part of the Headgum network. The official description reads, in part, "Having been described by the press as 'occasionally hard-to-follow,' 'as chaotic as they are iconic,' and 'going through it,' the band Muna started this podcast with the hope of providing not only more income, but also rare insight into the behavior of queers outside of the month of June." The podcast often features special guests, many of whom are queer, such as Phoebe Bridgers, Lucy Dacus, Julien Baker, Tegan and Sara, and Clea Duvall.

== Tours ==
=== Headlining ===
- Lay Down Your Weapons Tour (2017)
- Saves the World Tour (2019)
- 2022 North American & UK Tour (2022)
- Life's So Fun Tour (2023)
- Gets So Hot Tour (2026)

=== Supporting ===
- Grouplove – The Big Mess Tour (2016)
- Bleachers – Gone Now Era Tour (2017)
- Harry Styles – Harry Styles: Live on Tour (2017)
- The 1975 – North American Tour 2019 (2019)
- Phoebe Bridgers – Reunion Tour (2021–2022)
- Bleachers – Take the Sadness Out of Saturday Night Tour (2021)
- Kacey Musgraves – Star-Crossed: Unveiled (2022)
- Lorde – Solar Power Tour (2023)
- Taylor Swift – The Eras Tour (2023)

== Members ==
=== Current members ===
- Katie Gavin – lead vocals, production (2013–present)
- Josette Maskin – lead guitar, vocals (2013–present)
- Naomi McPherson – production, guitar, synth, vocals (2013–present)

== Discography ==
- About U (2017)
- Saves the World (2019)
- Muna (2022)
- Dancing on the Wall (2026)
