= One Foot in Front of the Other =

EP by Griff
- Released: 18 June 2021
- Genre: Pop
- Length: 20:25
- Label: Warner
- Producer: Griff; Lostboy

Griff chronology
The Mirror Talk (2019)	One Foot in Front of the Other (2021)	Vert1go Vol. 1 (2023)

Singles from One Foot in Front of the Other
- 1. "Black Hole" Released: 18 January 2021; 2. "One Foot in Front of the Other" Released: 27 May 2021; 3. "Shade of Yellow" Released: 16 June 2021

One Foot in Front of the Other is the debut mixtape by British singer and songwriter Griff. It was released on 18 June 2021 by Warner Records. Upon release, it was met with critical acclaim and peaked at number four on the UK Albums Chart.

== Background and release ==
One Foot in Front of the Other, follows Griff's debut extended play The Mirror Talk (2019). The EP's lead single, "Black Hole", was released on 18 January 2021; she performed the song in May 2021 at the 2021 Brit Awards where she was awarded the Brit Award for Rising Star. The single was followed by the release of the title track (One Foot In Front Of The Other) and "Shade of Yellow". Originally set to be released on 11 June, the release was pushed back by one week.

== Critical reception ==
Professional ratings
Aggregate scores
Source	Rating
Metacritic	93/100
Review scores
Source	Rating
Clash	8/10
DIY	4/5 stars
Dork	4/5 stars
Gigwise	8/10
The Guardian	4/5 stars
The Line of Best Fit	9/10
NME	5/5 stars

== Track listing ==
One Foot in Front of the Other track listing
No.	Title	Writer(s)	Producer(s)	Length
1.	"Black Hole"	Sarah Faith Griffiths; Peter Rycroft; Frederik Castenschiold Eichen	Lostboy	3:20
2.	"One Foot in Front of the Other"	Griffiths	Griff	3:12
3.	"Shade of Yellow"	Griffiths	Griff	2:36
4.	"Heart of Gold"	Griffiths	Griff	2:36
5.	"Remembering My Dreams"	Alastair O'Donnell; Felix Joseph; Griffiths	AOD; Joseph; Griff	3:22
6.	"Earl Grey Tea"	Griffiths	Griff	2:47
7.	"Walk"	Griffiths; Ines Dunn; Sam Tsang	Griff; Tsang	2:32
Total length:				20:25

CD and cassette bonus track
No.	Title	Writer(s)	Length
8.	"Take a Bow" (Radio 1 Piano Sessions)	Mikkel S. Eriksen; Tor Erik Hermansen; Shaffer Smith	3:42

== Charts ==
Chart performance for One Foot in Front of the Other
Chart (2021)	Peak position
Irish Albums (IRMA)	85
Scottish Albums (OCC)	5
UK Albums (OCC)	4
