= Bludfest =

British annual music festival

- Status: Active
- Genre: Cross-genre
- Frequency: Annual
- Locations: United Kingdom, Czech Republic
- Years active: 2024-present
- Website: Official website

Bludfest is a music festival founded by British singer-songwriter Yungblud in 2024. The festival was established as an alternative to conventional music festivals, with an emphasis on affordable ticket prices and a diverse line-up. Its inaugural edition was held at the National Bowl in Milton Keynes, England, on 11 August 2024. The festival returned to the same venue in 2025 before holding its first international edition at Park 360 in Hradec Králové, Czech Republic, in June 2026.

== History ==
=== Origins and inaugural edition (2024) ===
Yungblud announced Bludfest in March 2024 at a performance in Camden, London. The inaugural event was scheduled for 11 August 2024 at the National Bowl in Milton Keynes, with tickets initially priced at £49.50 before fees. The line-up included Lil Yachty, Soft Play, The Damned, Nessa Barrett, Lola Young and Jazmin Bean, alongside Yungblud as the headliner.

The first edition attracted approximately 30,000 attendees. Performances took place across two stages, with Noahfinnce, Jesse Jo Stark, Landon Barker, Hannah Grae and Aziya among the additional performers.

=== Second edition (2025) ===
The second edition took place on 21 June 2025 at the National Bowl in Milton Keynes. Organised in partnership with AEG Presents, it featured Yungblud, Chase Atlantic, Blackbear, Denzel Curry and Rachel Chinouriri, among others. Ticket prices ranged from £65 to £125.

The festival expanded its programming with additional activities and attractions, including a circus, an exhibition of memorabilia and temporary tattoo installations. The festival continued to combine performances across different musical genres.

=== International expansion (2026) ===
In February 2026, Yungblud announced that the festival's third edition would take place outside the United Kingdom for the first time. The event was held on 27 June 2026 at Park 360 in Hradec Králové, Czech Republic. The line-up included Biffy Clyro, Primal Scream, Palaye Royale, Pale Waves, Destroy Lonely, Bambie Thug, Jesse Jo Stark, Nieve Ella and Pam Rabbit, along with Yungblud.

The Czech edition was held at the same venue as the Rock for People festival, with the two events' organising teams working closely together. The programme featured three stages and included both international performers and Czech artists.

For this edition Yungblud also partnered with War Child on a fundraising campaign supporting children affected by conflict.

== Format and organisation ==
Bludfest is a multi-genre music festival curated by Yungblud, featuring performers from rock, alternative, pop and hip-hop. Its combines live music with additional attractions and activities.

The festival's original pricing model was based on offering tickets at a low cost. The inaugural edition also introduced a "Make a Friend" initiative, which connected attendees attending alone through online and in-person arrangements.

AEG Presents partnered with Yungblud in organising the second edition in 2025. The 2026 edition was organised in the Czech Republic in collaboration with the local festival infrastructure associated with Rock for People.

== Reception ==
The inaugural edition received criticism over delays at the entrance. AEG Presents apologised for the delays and attributed them to additional security measures.

The decision to hold the 2026 edition outside the United Kingdom received mixed reactions from fans, with some welcoming the festival's expansion into Europe while others expressed concern about the cost of travelling to the Czech Republic.

== See also ==
- List of music festivals in the United Kingdom
