= Aziya =

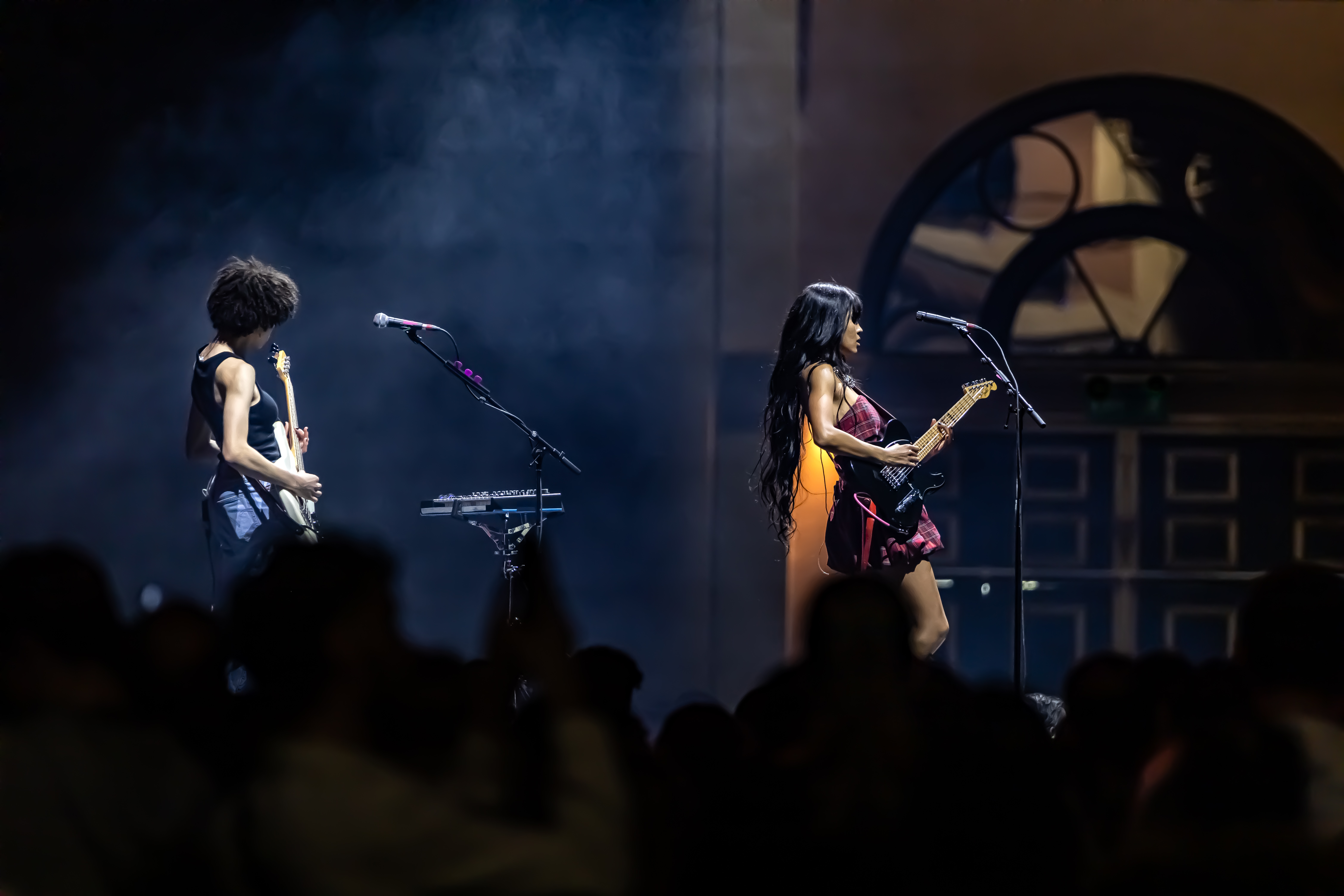
- Aziya at Ally Pally 2024

Background information
- Born: Aziya Satchmo Masai Aldridge-Moore; 11 December 2000 (age 25); Islington, London, England
- Genres: Alternative rock; pop rock; grunge; psychedelic
- Instruments: Vocals; guitar
- Years active: 2017–present
- Labels: LAB; Atlantic UK; Osmo-sis
- Website: www.itsaziya.com

Aziya Satchmo Masai Aldridge-Moore (born 2000) is an English singer-songwriter, guitarist and producer. She has released two EPs We Speak of Tides (2021) and Lonely Castles (2023), and a mixtape BAMBI (2024).

== Early life ==
Aldridge-Moore was born to an English father, a DJ, and a Barbadian mother and grew up in Hackney, East London. She is related to the Aldridge family. Aldridge-Moore attended the BRIT School for sixth form.

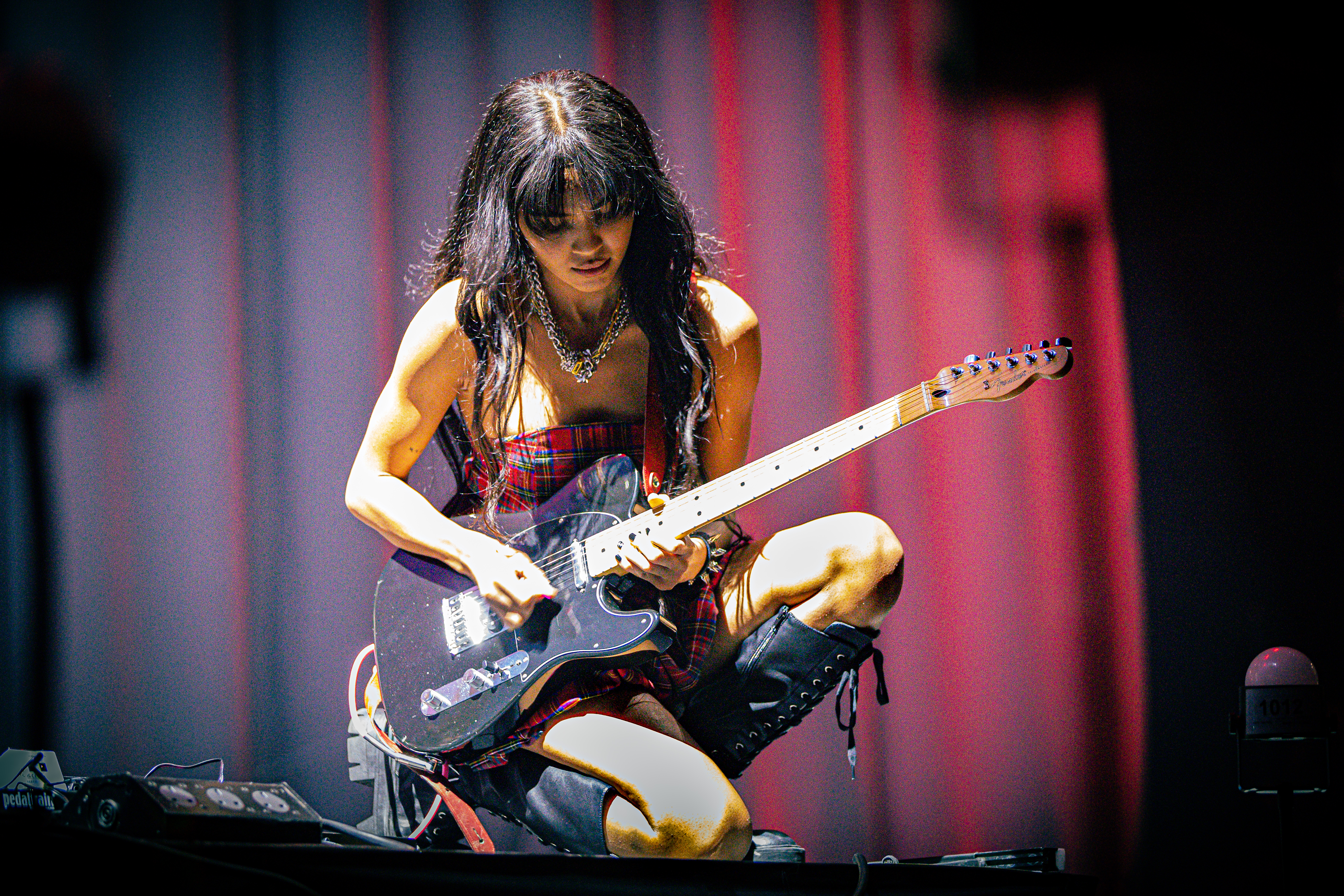
Aziya at Ally Pally, London 2024

== Career ==
Aldridge-Moore began her career as a model. She featured in Tatler in 2017 and 2019. Also in 2017, she uploaded the first song she wrote titled "Teen Face" to SoundCloud.

During the COVID-19 lockdown, Aldridge-Moore gained prominence online through covers of songs she posted on Instagram and other social media platforms. She was discovered by H.E.R., who invited Aldridge-Moore to play on a livestream of over 300 thousand viewers. In 2021, Aldridge-Moore released her debut EP We Speak of Tides via Osmo-sis, which had come about during lockdown. The EP's title compares relationships to water. She also released the singles "Slip!", which Olivia Swash of The Line of Best Fit called a "knockout debut", "Heaven for Me", and "Blood". In August, she was a select artist at BBC Music Introducing alongside The Lathums and Pixey.

In April 2022, Aldridge-Moore opened for The Vaccines on tour with Black Honey. She performed at Lollapalooza Stockholm and Victorious Festival that summer. In the autumn, she supported The Amazons and Nova Twins on tour and Florence + the Machine for their two O2 Arena concerts.

After performing at the 2023 Great Escape Festival, Aldridge-Moore had her first headline dates. She then featured at Reeperbahn Festival, Beyond the Music Festival, and Live at Leeds. That September, she released her second EP Lonely Castles, accompanied by the singles "atomic", "chain", and "wundagirl", named after producer WondaGurl, in the lead up to its release. At the end of 2023, Aldridge-Moore was named one to watch in 2024 by The Independent.

In April 2024, she supported HotWax on their UK tour. and released the single "party's over". She appeared at the Oberkampf Music Festival in Paris, the Dot to Dot Festival, Yungblud's Bludfest, Reading and Leeds on the BBC Music Introducing stage, Night Currents Festival, and Cardiff's Sŵn on the DIY stage. She also had a gig with Charly Bliss in London.

Aldridge-Moore signed with Atlantic Records UK (part of Warner Music Group (WMG), through which she released a 10-track mixtape titled BAMBI in November 2024. In addition to "party's over", further singles from the mixtape included "crush (tom verlaine)" and "call my name (lux lisbon)", the latter inspired by Sofia Coppola's The Virgin Suicides; she also shared "bbydoll" ahead of the mixtape. Shortly after the release of BAMBI, Aldridge-Moore supported Griff on her UK tour.

== Artistry ==
While Aldridge-Moore was growing up, her parents played a wide array of genres in the household, "from Patti Smith to The Cure to Wu-Tang to OutKast". She recalls being drawn towards the guitar-based sounds of System of a Down, No Doubt, Green Day and more. This lent itself an "emo phase" in her youth. Encouraged by her mother, who pointed towards figures such as Stevie Nicks and Prince, Aldridge-Moore took up guitar.

As she switched from acoustic to electronic, Aldridge-Moore listened to Led Zeppelin and then Ebo Taylor and CAN. She came to admire a number of women in rock, including Viv Albertine of The Slits, Sister Rosetta Tharpe, and June Millington of Fanny. In addition, Aldridge-Moore was shaped by London's electronic jazz, punk, and indie scenes, naming Steam Down and ALASKALASKA as local examples.

Aldridge-Moore's debut EP We Speak of Tides was influenced by Wolf Alice, Alanis Morissette, Pvris, and The Kills, The Stone Roses, PJ Harvey as well as Tame Impala and Yeah Yeah Yeahs. She listened to "Rich" by the latter while producing the track "Blood". Moving onto her second EP Lonely Castles, she drew upon The Cure, New Order, and Eyedress in addition to Santigold and Blondie.

== Discography ==
=== Mixtapes ===
- BAMBI (2024)

=== EPs ===
- We Speak of Tides (2021)
- LONELY CASTLES (2023)

=== Singles ===
- "Slip!" (2021)
- "Heaven for Me" (2021)
- "Blood" (2021)
- "girl meets world (demo)" (2022)
- "atomic" (2023)
- "chain" (2023)
- "wundagirl" (2023)
- "party's over" (2024)
- "crush (tom verlaine)" (2024)
- "call my name (lux lisbon)" (2024)
- "i'm in love, believe it" (2025)
- "diamonds" (2025)
- "he's mine" (2025)
- "Sabotage!" (2026)

=== Music videos ===
Year	Title	Director
2021	"Slip!"	Libby Burke Wilde
2021	"Heaven for Me"	Thomas James
2021	"Blood"	Thomas James
2021	"Marathon"	Aziya and Jack Durman
2022	"girl meets world (demo)"	Aziya and Jody Evans
2023	"atomic"	
2023	"chain"	Harry Steel (Haunted Mattress)
2023	"wundagirl"	Harry Steel (Haunted Mattress)
2024	"party's over"	Harry Steel (Haunted Mattress)
2024	"crush (tom verlaine)"	Isabelle Eyres
2024	"call my name (lux lisbon)"	Deadhorses
2024	"bbydoll"	Deadhorses
2024	"bambi"	Deadhorses
2025	"diamonds"	Deadhorses

=== As featured artist ===
- "Last Night's Mascara" (Live from Alexandra Palace) (2024) – Griff

== Awards and nominations ==
=== Berlin Music Video Awards ===
The Berlin Music Video Awards is an international festival that promotes the art of music videos.

Year	Nominated work	Award	Result	Ref.
2025	"bambi"	Best Low Budget	Nominated	
