= Lyric (musician) =

Australian singer-songwriter (born 2003)

- Born: Lyric Angelina Hatezic; September 9, 2003 (age 23); Gold Coast, Queensland, Australia
- Genre: Indie pop
- Occupations: singer; songwriter; producer
- Instruments: vocals; guitar; piano
- Years active: 2021-present
- Website: www.musicbylyric.com

Lyric (born 9 September 2003) is an Australian singer-songwriter. She has performed at multiple festivals including BIGSOUND, SXSW Sydney & Spilt Milk.

Lyric's third EP "The Art of Falling First" charted at number 9 on the ARIA Album Charts and number 2 on the Australian Album ARIA Charts.

== Career ==
=== 2021-2023: Beginning of career and "Every Colour, Every Hue" ===
Lyric started her music career by uploading videos to YouTube and songs to Bandcamp. The first song she posted was "I Can't Tell When I'm In Love" on 17 February 2021. She continued posting singles to Bandcamp and YouTube including "The Second Hand" and "Forever?" before she released her debut single to streaming "I Can't Tell When I'm In Love". Lyric released five more singles throughout 2021.

In 2022 Lyric released "Lunar Eclipse" the lead single to her debut EP "Every Colour, Every Hue". Between 2022 and 2023 Lyric released two more singles for her "Every Colour, Every Hue". She released the EP to streaming services on 24 March 2023. During this time Lyric was performing at shopping centres and the Springtime festival. Following the release of her debut EP, Lyric released a standalone single, "Wine Stain"

=== 2024-2025: Two more EPs, headline tours and chart success ===
In January 2024, Lyric released "Gravity". The song quickly became Lyric's most streamed song gaining over 900,000 streams on Spotify by October 2025. Lyric released "Wildfire (Make You Mine)" and "Isabella" throughout 2024 and on 20 September 2024 she released her second EP "Nostalgia. Alongside the release of her EP, Lyric released her first CD.

On 15 October 2024, Lyric announced her debut headlining tour, "The Nostalgia Tour". She originally had three dates: Brisbane, Sydney & Melbourne, and she added one more Brisbane show one week later. After two weeks of being on sale, the tour was sold out.

In February 2025, Lyric released "Friends". In March, she released her very first vinyl record for her EP "Nostalgia". Following the release of "Friends, Lyric performed a sold out show in Sydney and announced her first UK tour. In May, Lyric was announced to be a part of Spilt Milk Festival 2025 and Starburst Festival 2025. Lyric released "Make a Move" and "Homesick" between May and June 2025. She announced her third EP "The Art of Falling First" on 25 July 2025 and a month later announced "The Falling First Tour", with five dates across Australia.

Lyric performed at Triple J on 15 September 2025, covering "Ribs" by Lorde for Like a Version. She also performed Make a Move at Triple J.

On 17 October 2025, Lyric achieved her first charting success, on the ARIA charts. "The Art of Falling First" charted at number 2 on the Australian album chart and number 9 on the album chart.

== Personal life ==
Lyric has a younger sister, Harper. Lyric's song "Tahlia" is about her best-friend of the same name.

== Discography ==
=== Extended plays ===
Title	Details	Peak chart positions
Title	Details	AUS
Every Colour, Every Hue	Released: 24 March 2023; Formats: digital download, streaming	—
Nostalgia	Released: 20 September 2024; Formats: CD, LP, digital download, streaming	—
The Art of Falling First	Released: 10 October 2025; Formats: CD, LP, digital download, streaming	9
"—" denotes releases that did not chart in this region.

=== Singles ===
Title	Year	Album
"I Can't Tell When I'm in Love"	2021	Non-album singles
"Remember Everything"	2021	Non-album singles
"Falling Like Rain"	2021	Non-album singles
"Your Light"	2021	Non-album singles
"In Another Life"	2021	Non-album singles
"Trust Fund Baby"	2021	Non-album singles
"Lunar Eclipse"	2022	Every Colour, Every Hue
"1985"	2022	Every Colour, Every Hue
"Outdated"	2023	Every Colour, Every Hue
"Wine Stain"	2023	Non-album single
"Gravity"	2024	Nostalgia
"Wildfire (Make You Mine)"	2024	Nostalgia
"Isabella"	2024	Nostalgia
"Friends"	2025	The Art of Falling First
"Make a Move"	2025	The Art of Falling First
"Homesick"	2025	The Art of Falling First
"The Real You"	2025	The Art of Falling First
"For Business Reasons"	2026	TBD
"Go Tell Your Stories"	2026	TBD

== Tours ==
=== Headlining act ===
- The Nostalgia Tour (2024)
- Lyric Takes on the UK (2025)
- The Falling First Tour (2025)

=== Opening act ===
- Little Green - Little Green Australian Tour (2024)
- Griff - World Vertigo Tour (2024)
- Beth McCarthy - IDK How to Talk to Girls Tour (2024)

== Awards and nominations ==
Award	Year	Nominee(s)	Category	Result	Ref.
Gold Coast Music Awards	2023	Herself	Breakout Artist of the Year	Nominated	
Gold Coast Music Awards	2023	Herself	Gold Coast Music Prize	Won	
Gold Coast Music Awards	2023	Herself	People's Choice Award	Won	
Gold Coast Music Awards	2024	Herself	Breakout Artist of the Year	Nominated	
Gold Coast Music Awards	2024	Herself	Studio Producer of the Year	Nominated	
Gold Coast Music Awards	2024	"Gravity"	Song of the Year	Nominated	
Gold Coast Music Awards	2024	Herself	People's Choice Award	Won	
Gold Coast Music Awards	2025	Herself	Breakout Artist of the Year	Won	
Gold Coast Music Awards	2025	Herself	Live Act of the Year	Nominated	
Gold Coast Music Awards	2025	Herself	People's Choice Award	Nominated	
Gold Coast Music Awards	2025	"Make a Move"	Song of the Year	Nominated	
Queensland Music Awards	2026	Herself	Carol Lloyd Award	Nominated	
