= Black Hole (song) =

Single by Griff

from the album One Foot in Front of the Other
- Released: 18 January 2021
- Length: 3:20
- Label: Warner
- Songwriters: Sarah Faith Griffiths; Peter Rycroft; Frederik Castenschiold Eichen
- Producer: Lostboy

Griff singles chronology
"Love Is a Compass" (2020)	"Black Hole" (2021)	"One Foot in Front of the Other" (2021)

Music video
- "Black Hole" on YouTube

"Black Hole" is a song by British singer-songwriter Griff, from her mixtape One Foot in Front of the Other. The song is written by Griff, Peter Rycroft, and Frederik Castenschiold Eichen and produced by Lostboy. The song was released on 18 January 2021 on the Warner Records label. It reached number eighteen in the UK, becoming her highest charting single there.

== Background and production ==
After a string of releases in 2020 from "Good Stuff" to "Love Is a Compass" which provided Griff with her first UK chart entry, "Black Hole" served as Griff's first release in 2021. Being penned by Griff herself, when talking about the song with media company "The Forty-Five" Griff stated “Some people might listen to it and think, ‘Oh, these lyrics are quite deep, but I think I was trying to make them so melodramatic that there’s humor about them, It’s finding the humor in your own heartbreak. There’s obviously not a big black hole where my heart used to be.”

== Critical reception and performance ==
Rachael Jansky of "Ones to Watch" stated "Griff personifies the emptiness of losing someone, relating it to an all-consuming black hole. While a bit melodramatic, it perfectly captures just how overwhelming it can be to process a break-up and put yourself back together. The song's production is flooded with a bouncy synth and punchy drum beat, a darker twist on Griff's typical bright poppy sound. Showcasing her versatility and lyrical maturity, "Black Hole" alludes to Griff's inevitable stardom." Robin Murray of "CLASH" wrote a few words about the track stating "The songwriter opened January with a bang, landing a prime spot in the BBC Sound Of 2021 poll. New single 'Black Hole' builds on this, and it might well be Griff's finest moment to date."

To Date "Black Hole" is Griff's best performing song on the charts marking her first Irish chart entry and highest-peaking UK single peaking at 25 on the Irish Singles Chart and number 18 on the UK Singles Chart as well as 5 on the UK Top 100 Singles Downloads Chart. Griff performed the song on “Late Night With Seth Meyers” which served as the first televised live performance of the song on March 22, 2021. The performance was later posted to Griff’s YouTube channel on May 19. She also performed the song for the second time on live television on May 11, at the 2021 Brit Awards, where she was nominated for and won the Brit Award for Rising Star.

== Personnel ==
Credits adapted from YouTube Music.

- Sarah Faith Griffiths – vocals, songwriting
- Jez Coad – production, Keyboards, Bass Programmer, Drum Programmer
- Frederik Castenschiold Eichen – songwriting
- Peter Rycroft – songwriting
- Dan Grech-Marguerat – mixing
- Chris Gehringer – mastering

== Charts ==
Chart performance for "Black Hole"
Chart (2021)	Peak position
Belgium (Ultratip Bubbling Under Flanders)	28
Ireland (IRMA)	25
New Zealand Hot Singles (RMNZ)	16
Poland (Polish Airplay Top 100)	63
UK Singles (OCC)	18

== Certifications ==
Certifications for "Black Hole"
Region	Certification	Certified units/sales
Australia (ARIA)	Gold	35,000^{‡}
United Kingdom (BPI)	Gold	400,000^{‡}
^{‡} Sales+streaming figures based on certification alone.

== Release history ==
Release history for "Black Hole"
Region	Date	Format	Label
Various	18 January 2021	Digital download; streaming	Warner
