= Tijuana Cartel (band) =

Australian music group

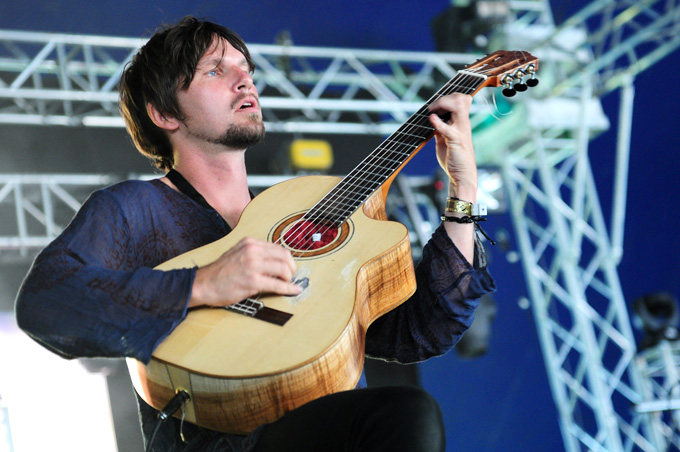
- Paul George of Tijuana Cartel 2012

Background information
- Origin: Gold Coast, Queensland, Australia
- Years active: 2003–present
- Members: Paul George; Carey O'Sullivan
- Past members: Joshua Sinclair; Daniel Gonzalez; She-J

Tijuana Cartel are an electronic music group from Gold Coast, Australia. They have described their sound as electronic music with a world music element.

The group formed in 2003, taking their name from the movie Traffic. Originally consisting of Paul George and Carey O'Sullivan, they remain the sole consistent members of the group which has also included Joshua Sinclair, Daniel Gonzalez, She-J, and others within their live shows.

After releasing a self-titled EP in 2003, Tijuana Cartel released an EP titled Frequent Flyers which was expanded to become their 2007 debut album Frequent Flyers Redeemed. The album mixed flamenco guitar with electronic music, while later albums mixed dub, roots, and rock music sounds.

After receiving airplay on national radio station Triple J, the band began to gain some recognition and toured festivals around Australia. This led to further tours in Europe, India, and Beijing during the 2008 Olympic Games.

The Sydney Morning Herald called them "one of the most fearsome live bands in the country" but noted their albums often did not live up to that reputation until 2014's 24bit Guitar Orchestra.

Their 2015 album Psychedelicatessan was inspired by, and featured samples from, the Australian cult radio play What's Rangoon To You Is Grafton To Me, written and performed by Russell Guy and James Dibble. Russell visited Tijuana Cartel's studio while they were recording after they sought permission to use his work.

The band won Live Act Of The Year at 2018 and 2020's Gold Coast Music Awards. They were nominated for 2021's awards for Live Act Of The Year, and Video Of The Year for their song Minimal Stuffing.

Their 2021 album Acid Pony entered the Australian Independent Record Labels Association Independent Albums chart at #18.

== Discography ==
=== Albums ===
List of albums, with selected details
Title	Details
Frequent Flyers Redeemed	Released: 2007; Format: CD, digital; Label: Tijuana Cartel
Tijuana Sessions	Released: 2008; Format: CD, digital; Label: Tijuana Cartel
They'll Come	Released: 2009; Format: CD, digital; Label: One World Music (OWM033-CD)
M1	Released: November 2011; Format: CD, digital; Label: Tijuana Cartel (TCM004)
24 Bit Guitar Orchestra	Released: September 2014; Format: CD, digital; Label: Tijuana Cartel (TCM005)
Psychedelicatessan	Released: September 2015; Format: CD, digital; Label: Tijuana Cartel (TCM006)
Live at Hotel Brunswick	Released: 2018; Format: CD, digital; Label: Tijuana Cartel
Bhairavi's Garden	Released: 2019; Format: LP; Label: Tijuana Cartel
Acid Pony	Released: 2021; Format: CD, LP, digital; Label: Tijuana Cartel (TCM009)
Alectura	Released: 2023; Format: LP, digital; Label: Beat & Path (TC003)

=== Extended plays ===
List of EPs, with selected details
Title	Details
Tijuana Cartel	Released: 2003; Format: CD; Label: Tijuana Cartel
New Revolution	Released: 2007; Format: CD, digital; Label: Tijuana Cartel
White Dove	Released: 2010; Format: CD (limited), digital; Label: Tijuana Cartel

== Awards ==
=== Gold Coast Music Awards ===
The Gold Coast Music Awards are an annual awards ceremony that recognises musicians from the Gold Coast area.

Year	Nominee / work	Award	Result	Ref.
2020		Live Act of the year	Won	
2021		Live Act of the year	Nominated	
2021	Minimal Stuffing	Video Of The Year	Nominated	
2022		Live Act of the year	Won	
2024	Believe In Nothing	Video of the year	Won	
