= Jacob Alon =

Scottish singer-songwriter (born 2000/01)

- Born: 2000–2001
- Origin: Dalgety Bay, Fife, Scotland
- Genre: Indie folk
- Occupations: Musician; songwriter
- Instruments: Guitar; vocals
- Years active: 2024–present
- Labels: Island; EMI
- Website: jacobalon.scot

Jacob Alon is a Scottish singer-songwriter. After releasing their debut single Fairy In A Bottle in 2024, they rose to prominence after appearing on Later... with Jools Holland. Their debut album In Limerence was released through Island Records and EMI Records in 2025, which was nominated for the Mercury Prize and Scottish Album of the Year Award, and led to Alon winning the Critics' Choice Award at the Brit Awards 2026.

== Early and personal life ==
Alon grew up in Dalgety Bay, and learned the piano and guitar as a child. They studied theoretical physics and medicine at the University of Edinburgh, but dropped out to pursue music.

Alon identifies as non-binary and uses they/them pronouns. They have Tourette syndrome.

== Career ==
Alon's debut album, In Limerence, was released on 30 May 2025, produced by Dan Carey. The album received critical acclaim, and was shortlisted for the Mercury Prize 2025, and longlisted for the 2025 Scottish Album of the Year Award.

Following the album's success, Alon was announced as the BBC Introducing Artist of the Year 2025.

During 2025, Alon supported the tours of Olly Alexander and Kae Tempest, and made their Glastonbury Festival debut.

Alon won the Critics' Choice Award at the Brit Awards 2026.

In February 2026, Alon appeared and performed on The Graham Norton Show.

== Discography ==
=== Studio albums ===
List of studio albums, with selected details
Title	Details	Peak chart positions	
Title	Details	UK	SCO
In Limerence	Released: 30 May 2025; Label: Island Records, EMI Records; Formats: CD, LP, digital download, streaming	36	3

=== Singles ===
Title	Year	Peak chart positions	Album or EP	Ref.
Title	Year	UK Sales	Album or EP	Ref.
"Fairy in a Bottle"	2024	—	In Limerence	
Confession	2024	—	In Limerence	
"Liquid Gold 25"	2025	98	In Limerence	
Find Ur Ppl (with Jasmine.4.T)	2025	—	Non-album single	
"—" denotes a recording that did not chart or was not released in that territory.

== Awards and nominations ==
Year	Award	Work	Category	Result	Ref.
2025	Mercury Prize	In Limerence	Album of the Year	Nominated	
2025	BBC Music Introducing	Themself	Artist of the Year	Won	
2026	Brit Awards	Themself	Critics’ Choice	Won	
