= Inside Out (Zedd and Griff song) =

2020 song by Zedd and Griff

Single by Zedd and Griff
- Released: 23 October 2020
- Genre: Dance-pop; EDM; electropop; house; pop
- Length: 3:06
- Label: Interscope
- Songwriters: Anton Zaslavski; Brittany Amaradio; Jonas Jeberg; Michael Pollack; Sarah Griffiths
- Producers: Jonas Jeberg; Zedd

Zedd singles chronology
"Funny" (2020)	"Inside Out" (2020)	"You've Got to Let Go If You Want to Be Free" (2022)

Griff singles chronology
"1,000,000 X Better" (2020)	"Inside Out" (2020)	"Love Is a Compass" (2020)

Music video
- "Inside Out" on YouTube

"Inside Out" is a song by Russian-German record producer and DJ Zedd and English singer Griff. It was written by Delacey, Michael Pollack, Zedd, Griff and Jonas Jeberg, with the latter two producing the song. It was released by Interscope Records on 23 October 2020.

== Background ==
Zedd started to work on "Inside Out" near mid 2019. In February 2020, Griff was in Los Angeles when she was notified by a friend that Zedd was looking for a singer for a song. She recorded a demo on the night she was leaving. Zedd recorded a few singers, but felt "something just didn't connect" for him. His manager later showed him Griff's demo, and he "immediately fell in love with her voice". He subsequently asked Griff to fly to Los Angeles for a studio session, where they recorded the final version of the vocal, before the COVID-19 pandemic had started.

"We are in such a tense state of the world right now," Zedd said in a statement, referring to the pandemic and social unrest in the United States, which has put people under "an unbelievably large amount of stress". He felt the song could provide people with "a much-needed sense of hope", "joy, positivity and serve as a reminder to everyone that better times will come". In a tweet, he called "Inside Out" a special song to him and one of his favorite songs he has made in a while. "It makes me feel happy, optimistic, hopeful and enthusiastic... all things that I have been lacking throughout quarantine to be perfectly honest," he explains.

== Release and promotion ==
On 20 October 2020, three days before the song's release, Zedd posted two short previews on Instagram, one contains piano riffs, while another features Griff's falsettos. To promote the single, Zedd released limited edition merchandise on his official store. The "Inside Out" collection includes branded t-shirts, lenticular posters, holographic sticker packs, and a limited edition reversible 3D sweatshirt. A lyric video was released alongside the single. Zedd and Griff also appeared on Apple Music's DanceXL Radio with Anna Lunoe for an interview on 30 October 2020.

On 13 November 2020, Zedd announced a remix contest for "Inside Out", in which three remixes will be selected for inclusion in an official remix pack released via Interscope Records. Zedd launched the "Inside Out Scavenger Hunt" with YouTuber DoodleChaos on 29 November 2020, in which participants had to compete in solving a series of ten unique challenges inside Minecraft for a chance to win special prizes from Logitech, Elgato, Discord and Mavix.

On 10 December 2020, a choreography-centric video for the song titled the "Dance Version" was released. It was directed and choreographed by Pennywild, and features two dancers from the group–Jake Kodish and Erica Klein. The official music video was released on 17 December 2020. On 21 December 2020, the official remix pack was released via Interscope Records. This included remixes from Maliboux, 3SCAPE DRM and Dominuscreed, who won the remix contest which saw more than 600 submissions.

== Composition ==
"Inside Out" is a dance-pop, EDM, electropop, house and pop song about falling and staying in love, and holding onto worthy relationships. Griff also notes that the song promotes "the idea of loving someone from the inside first", instead of focusing on "how things look on the outside". The majority of lyrics were written by Jonas Jeberg, Michael Pollack and Delacey. Zedd "immediately resonated with them" after he received the draft, and started producing the song about a year and a half before its official release. Griff amended some lyrics and wrote the bridge while she was in the studio to make the song authentic and "something [she] was connected to". The song also mentions intimate details like having a "scar on my shoulder" and being "terrified of getting older". When asked if the lyrics have a personal meaning, both Zedd and Griff said that the lyrics are open to interpretation, while Griff clarifies that she does not really have a scar on her shoulder, but she thinks "everyone can relate to small personal things about themselves that only the people closest to you know".

In interviews with Billboard and Paper, Zedd stated that "Inside Out" is both "new" and "familiar" for him. When asked what the song suggests about his evolution as an artist, Zedd told Billboard: "I always want to feel inspired and reinvent myself. I've never loved staying the same. If you look through my last decade of music, you will see it is constantly changing, and evolving. I want to keep doing that." Zedd pointed out that there are some elements on the track that are new to him in terms of production. For example, the drop is slightly delayed and not on the actual "1" of the beat, but instead the "4-AND", which is "something [Zedd] ha[s] never tried before in a dance song". The drop has been characterized as containing "catchy synths and trap inspired percussion", while Griff's voice has been described to be inspired by "passionate R&B".

== Music video ==
A music video for the song was released on YouTube on 17 December 2020. The video was directed by Rianne White and Ali Kurr.

=== Synopsis ===
The video starts with Griff entering a mansion at night, with her and Zedd both shown playing video games alone with an Xbox controller. The video then sees the two exploring the mansion during the day, with Griff singing and walking across the mansion's garden as Zedd drives around on a BMW motorcycle. The scenes alternate between night and day in the garden's hedge maze with Griff as a focus. The video trails Griff as she encounters barriers along her journey in the maze, before facing off against an alternate version of herself around a small fountain, with Zedd circling them on his motorcycle. In the end, she rises above the maze she is stuck in, proving that she has broken free.

=== Credits and personnel ===
Credits adapted from Interscope Records.

- Partizan Entertainment – production company
- Rianne White – director
- Rosie Litterick – producer
- Sara Nix – executive producer
- Julie Fong – executive producer
- Sy Turnball – director of photography
- Bobbie Cousins – art director
- Jamie O’Donnell – editor
- Kamran Rajput – wardrobe stylist
- Mata Marielle – make-up artist
- Tomomi Roppongi – hair stylist
- Jack Shillingford – VFX artist
- Jonjo Lowe – VFX additional supporter
- Kelvin Chim – VFX additional supporter
- Ross McDowell – VFX additional supporter
- Chris Hart – VFX additional supporter
- George Kyriacou – color grader
- Rosie Brear – production manager
- Paul Molloy – gaffer
- Matt Alsop – Steadicam operator
- Bob Schofield – stunt coordinator
- Stephanie Rowe – motorcycle driver
- Jane V. – Griff's double
- Haruka Oshima – Griff's wire rigger
- Shannon Leskowitz – video commissioner

== Critical reception ==
Rachel Narozniak of Dancing Astronaut praised the song, saying that it "possesses an undeniably catchy personality", which "[extends] Zedd's tradition of releases with impact that won't fade when the last second of runtime strikes", and further proves "Zedd's dance-pop crown" to be "immovable".

== Live performances ==
On 20 November 2020, Griff performed the song live at the Tanks in London's Tate Modern.

== Track listing ==
- Digital download and streaming
1. "Inside Out" – 3:06
- Digital download and streaming – Remixes
1. "Inside Out" (featuring Griff) [Maliboux Remix] – 2:39
2. "Inside Out" (featuring Griff) [3SCAPE DRM Remix] – 3:09
3. "Inside Out" (featuring Griff) [Dominuscreed Remix] – 3:34

== Credits and personnel ==
- Zedd – songwriting, production, mixing, programming
- Griff – songwriting
- Brittany Amaradio – songwriting
- Jonas Jeberg – songwriting, production, programming
- Michael Pollack – songwriting
- Ryan Shanahan – record engineering

== Charts ==
=== Weekly charts ===
Weekly chart performance for "Inside Out"
Chart (2020)	Peak position
Italian Airplay (EarOne)	97
US Hot Dance/Electronic Songs (Billboard)	12

=== Year-end charts ===
Year-end chart performance for "Inside Out"
Chart (2021)	Position
US Hot Dance/Electronic Songs (Billboard)	72

== Release history ==
Region	Date	Format	Version	Label	Ref.
Various	23 October 2020	Digital download; streaming	Original	Interscope	
Australia	23 October 2020	Contemporary hit radio	Original	Universal	
Italy	30 October 2020	Contemporary hit radio	Original	Universal	
Various	22 December 2020	Digital download; streaming	Remixes	Interscope	
