= Gold Coast Music Awards =

Australian music awards

- Country: Australia
- First award: 2015
- Website: https://www.gcmusicnetwork.com.au/gcma/

The Gold Coast Music Awards is an annual awards night celebrating the Australian music industry based in the Gold Coast.

Founded in 2015 by Samantha Morris, Chloe Popa and Amanda Gorman, the awards are produced by the Gold Coast Music Network, with support from City of Gold Coast and Major Events Gold Coast. 2021's finalists were announced in August 2021, with the awards held on September 4. The People's Choice Award was opened to public voting on 19 August, with all finalists automatically nominated.

Nominations for 2025's Awards opened in July 2025. To be eligible, a nominee must have a strong connection to the Gold Coast and have released music, performed, or been active in their category between 1 April 2024 and 31 May 2025.

== Categories ==
=== Current ===
Since 2015 the categories have evolved. A recent addition was the Gold Coast Music Prize in 2020.

Category	First awarded	Notes
Artist of The Year	2015	
Breakout Artist of The Year	2015	Previously Emerging Artist of the Year - Renamed in 2017
Song of The Year	2015	
Venue of The Year	2015	
People's Choice Award	2015	Not awarded in 2018
Video of The Year	2016	
Release of The Year	2017	Previously Album of the Year - Renamed in 2019
Live Act of The Year	2018	
Musician of The Year	2019	
Gold Coast Music Prize	2020	
Studio producer of The Year	2022	
Visual Creative Of The Year	2022	

=== Retired ===
Category	First awarded	Last awarded	Notes
Live Music Event of the Year	2015	2017	Renamed Event of the Year in 2016
Local Music Champion of the Year	2015	2016	Renamed Champion of the Year in 2016
Hall of Fame	2019	2022	Held irreguarly

== 2015 Gold Coast Music Awards ==
The 2015 awards took place on July 22 at Burleigh Heads, Gold Coast. Finalist were announced in June. The winners were the following.

Local Music Champion of the year

Polly Snowden

Emerging Artist of the year

Hanlon Brothers

Live Music Venue of the year

Soundlounge

Band/Artist of the year

Karl S Williams

Live Music Event of the year

Buskers By The Creek

Song of the year

Lane-Harry X Ike Campbell - Anarchy

People’s Choice

Casey Barnes

== 2016 Gold Coast Music Awards ==
The 2016 awards took place on June 16. The winners were the following.

Music Champion of the year

Guy Cooper

Emerging Artist of the year

Leopold's Treat

Live Music Venue of the year

Nightquarter

Artist of the year

Hussy Hicks

Event of the year

Blues On Broadbeach

Song of the year

Ella Fence - Unknown Water

Music Video of the year

Ella Fence - Unknown Water

People’s Choice

Jason McGregor

== 2017 Gold Coast Music Awards ==
The 2017 awards took place on 27 April at Surfers Paradise. The winners were the following.

Breakout Artist of the year

Tesla Cøils

Venue of the year

elsewhere

Artist of the year

Amy Shark

Event of the year

Blues on Broadbeach

Song of the year

Amy Shark - Adore

Album of the year

Lane Harry x Ike Campbell - Youth

Video of the year

The Black Swamp - Common Crows

People’s Choice

Being Jane Lane

== 2018 Gold Coast Music Awards ==
The 2018 awards took place on 3 May. The winners were the following.

Album of the year

Hussy Hicks - On The Boundaries

Artist of the year

Amy Shark

Breakout artist of the year

Hollow Coves

Event of the year

Shakafest

Live act of the year

The Mason Rack Band

Song of the year

Hollow Coves - Coastline

Venue of the year

Miami Tavern Shark Bar

Video of the year

Lane Harry x Ike Campbell - The Dash

== 2019 Gold Coast Music Awards ==
The 2019 awards took place on 2 May. The winners were the following.

Hall Of Fame Inductee

Amy Shark

Artist of the year

Amy Shark

Breakout Artist of the year

San Mei

Live Act of the year

Amy Shark

Musician of the year

Ian Peres

Release of the year

Amy Shark - Love Monster

Song of the year

San Mei - Wonder

Venue of the year

Vinnies Dive

Video of the year

YT DiNGO - Shipwrecked

People’s Choice

Elska

== 2020 Gold Coast Music Awards ==
The 2020 awards took place on 30 April and were streamed on Facebook. The winners were the following.

Artist Of The Year

Casey Barnes

Breakout Artist of the year

Eliza And The Delusionals

Live Act of the year

Tijuana Cartel

Musician of the year

Julz Parker (Hussy Hicks)

Release of the year

Busby Marou - The Great Divide

Song of the year

DVNA - Looking Like A Snack

Venue of the year

HOTA: Home Of The Arts

Video of the year

Eddie Ray - The Story

Gold Coast Music Prize

DENNIS.

People’s Choice

Lagerstein

== 2021 Gold Coast Music Awards ==
The 2021 awards took place on 4 September. The winners were the following.

Artist of the year

Casey Barnes

Breakout of the year

Jesswar

Live Act of the year

Peach Fur

Musician of the year

Scott French

Release of the year

Karl S Williams - Lifeblood

Song of the year

Beckah Amani - Standards

Venue of the year

Mo's Desert Clubhouse

Video of the year

Beckah Amani - Standards

Gold Coast Music Prize

Selve

People’s Choice

Euca

== 2022 Gold Coast Music Awards ==
The 2022 awards took place on 3 September. The winners were the following.

Hall Of Fame Inductee

Casey Barnes

Artist of the year

Casey Barnes

Breakout of the year

Buttered

Live Act of the year

Tijuana Cartel

Musician of the year

Sofia Isella

Release of the year

Wildheart - Global Crisis

Song of the year

Eliza And The Delusionals - Save Me

Studio producer of the year

Brad Hosking

Venue of the year

Mo's Desert Clubhouse

Video of the year

Gimmy Flowens - Don't Be Afraid

Visual Creative Of The Year

Bianca Hinton

Gold Coast Music Prize

Girl And Girl

People’s Choice

Lily Grace

== 2023 Gold Coast Music Awards ==
The 2023 awards took place on 31 August. The winners were the following.

Artist of the year

Bujerah

Breakout of the year

Girl and Girl

Live Act of the year

Bujerah

Musician of the year

Omar Hanlon

Release of the year

Saint Lane - i thought my name was cursed

Song of the year

Alt Fiction - Why Are You Still Here

Studio producer of the year

Jared Adlam

Venue of the year

Elsewhere

Video of the year

Geniie Boy - Better

Visual Creative of the year

Jared Hinz

Gold Coast Music Prize

Lyric

People’s Choice

Lyric

== 2024 Gold Coast Music Awards ==
The 2024 awards took place on 29 August. The winners were the following.

Artist of the year

Hollow Coves

Breakout of the year

Chloe Styler

Live Act of the year

Hussy Hicks

Musician of the year

Julz Parker

Release of the year

Hollow Coves - Nothing to Lose

Song of the year

JK-47 – Lullaby

Studio producer of the year

Mattymadeit

Venue of the year

Mo’s Desert Clubhouse

Video of the year

Tijuana Cartel - Believe In Nothing

Visual Creative of the year

Simone Gorman-Clark

Gold Coast Music Prize

Parker

People’s Choice

Lyric

== 2025 Gold Coast Music Awards ==
The 2025 awards took place on 27 November. The winners were the following.

Artist of the year

Beckah Amani

Breakout of the year

Lyric

Live Act of the year

Hollow Coves

Musician of the year

Robbie Bostock - Guitar

Release of the year

TANISHA - On My Terms

Song of the year

bella amor - rocks in my pocket

Studio producer of the year

Luke Palmer

Venue of the year

Den Devine

Video of the year

Selve - Breaking Into Heaven

Visual Creative of the year

Jared Hinz

Gold Coast Music Prize

Blind Corners

People’s Choice

Lecia Louise
