= Blind Corners =

Australian indie-rock group

- Origin: Gold Coast, Queensland, Australia
- Genre: Indie rock
- Years active: 2021–present
- Members: Toby Angus; Jay Dallas; Joe Denley; Martin Niklasson

Blind Corners are an Australian indie rock band formed in Gold Coast, Queensland. The group have opened for Paul Kelly and Glass Beams. In August 2026, they released their debut album Sink or Swim.

== History ==
=== 2021–2024: Formation and Mud ===
Blind Corners is composed of former schoolmates Toby Angus, Jay Dallas and Joe Denley who attended Tamborine Mountain State High School and played covers. In 2021, Swedish drummer Martin Niklasson joined the trio, forming the group.

Their debut EP Mud was produced by George Carpenter and was released in September 2024.

In 2024 they were finalists in the Byron Bay Bluesfest Busking Competition.

=== 2025–present: Sink or Swim ===
At the 2025 Gold Coast Music Awards, their group was nominated for three awards, winning the Gold Coast Music Prize.

In August 2026, the group released Sink or Swim. The album was preceded by singles "Down River" on the 10th of June, "Alice" on the 8th of July and "Doctor" on the 5th of August 2026.

== Discography ==
=== Studio albums ===
List of studio albums, with selected details
Title	Album details	Peak chart positions
Title	Album details	AUS
Sink or Swim	Released: 28 August 2026; Format: CD, LP, digital; Label: Blind Corners	72

=== Extended plays ===
List of EPs, with selected details
Title	EP details
Mud	Released: September 2024; Format: digital; Label: Blind Corners
