= In Limerence =

Studio album by Jacob Alon
- Released: 30 May 2025
- Genre: Indie folk
- Length: 46:29
- Labels: Island; EMI
- Producer: Dan Carey

Singles from In Limerence
- 1. "Fairy in a Bottle" Released: 9 September 2024; 2. "Confession" Released: 11 November 2024; 3. "Liquid Gold 25" Released: 3 February 2025; 4. "Don't Fall Asleep" Released: 13 March 2025; 5. "August Moon" Released: 23 April 2025

In Limerence is the debut studio album by Scottish singer Jacob Alon. It was released on 30 May 2025, via Island Records and EMI Records. The album was produced by Dan Carey. It was preceded by the singles, "Fairy In a Bottle", "Confession", "Liquid Gold 25", "Don't Fall Asleep", and "August Moon".

The album received universal acclaim from critics, reached number three on the Scottish Albums Chart, and was nominated for both the Mercury Prize, and Scottish Album of the Year Award.

== Background ==
Alon released their debut single "Fairy in a Bottle" on 9 September 2024, ultimately becoming the first single from the then-unannounced album. They cite the song as the most difficult for them to perform live at first due to the raw, personal nature of the track, explaining “I’m not the good guy in ‘Fairy In A Bottle’; I'm very much coming to terms with how this [fixation on someone] is quite a selfish thing to do. It's also hard for the object of that desire – it's a lot to put someone onto this impossibly high pedestal that no one can live up to.”

"Confession" was released on 11 November 2024 as the album's second single. A song about navigating queer shame in adolescence, Alon posted a lengthy statement describing the genesis of the song and concluded by saying, “I wish I could tell little Cob how much joy and beauty was waiting for them on the other side of all that pain. I hope I can give the same love to anyone out there who’s still figuring things out. And I want to keep giving it to you – my beautiful, boundless, infinite queers. This song is for you. This song is for little Cob.”

The album's third single, "Liquid Gold 25", was released on 3 February 2025. Named after a brand of poppers, the lyrics depict the shallowness and emptiness of transactional sexual experiences, with Alon noting that some have described it as an "anti-romantic" song. Written after a “series of particularly degrading Grindr hook-ups”, Alon stated that, “to me, [the song is] about the tormenting cycles of self-love and loathing, deleting, redownloading… The self-harming practice of chasing after something that you know will hurt you… Of my need to dissociate and retreat from the present moment through hedonism and into fantasy… Holding my breath until it stops hurting… Of seeking connection in a place of such superficial desire and objectification… Seeking validation through sex and how that ultimately leads to a deep loneliness.”

Alon announced In Limerance on 13 March 2025 alongside the release of single "Don't Fall Asleep". Of the track, Alon stated that it was inspired by a cousin who drowned in a freak accident, explaining that “I never knew him personally, but I’ve always had an idea painted in my mind of what he’d be like through the memories & stories of my family members. Because of this, I’ve always had a kind of fictional relationship to him. So, this song takes place in the liminal space between worlds, from his fictional perspective. In a strange bout of synchronicity, just as I was writing this song, I received a message from my cousin’s brother - who told me the story of how he and my cousin used to pick a record each night to fall asleep to - I found this to be a wildly meaningful coincidence.”

The final pre-release single, "August Moon", was released on 23 April 2025. The track was based on a trip that Alon took to Malia with a friend shortly after they confessed their feelings for them. The rebuilding of their friendship was interrupted when the pair were assaulted in a homophobic attack. Of the experience and its influence on the song, Alon explained, “I had nightmares about that night for so long, but I think one of the biggest parts was the shame - almost feeling really silly that I could have loved someone in a world with so much violence. For years, I carried around that fear and that pain, and then it was only writing that song and telling that story that I was able to let go of that and process that. Now, when I sing that song, I sing it with an extra bit of triumph.”

== Reception ==
Professional ratings
Review scores
Source	Rating
Clash	9/10 stars
DIY	4/5 stars
The Guardian	3/5 stars
The Skinny	4/5 stars

Clash rated the album nine out of ten, describing it as "an extraordinary achievement, a record that truly picks the listener up in one place, and deposits them in another," while DIY noted in its review, "Jacob's tender touch on themes of fantasy, dreams and love feels earned across In Limerence, as if repairing themself via songwriting rather than declaring experiences from a distance," rating it four stars.

The Skinny gave In Limerence a four-star rating, and described it as "at once confident and vulnerable" and "the product of deliberate action and agency". The Guardian rated it three stars, stating "The Scottish songwriter delivers a confident, well-expressed debut even if their songs sometimes stray into overfamiliar indie-folk territory." Billboard remarked, "Gliding between sublime melodies and grimy, guttural dissonance, the record is cinematic in its acoustic grandeur and intimate in its inspection."

=== Accolades ===
On 10 September 2025, In Limerence was announced as one of 12 nominees for the 2025 Mercury Prize. On 25 September, it was announced as one of 20 albums on the longlist for the 2025 Scottish Album of the Year Award.

== Track listing ==
All tracks are written by Jacob Alon; "Home Tapes" written with Dan Carey.

In Limerence track listing
No.	Title	Length
1.	"Glimmer"	1:03
2.	"Of Amber"	2:39
3.	"Don't Fall Asleep"	4:29
4.	"I Couldn't Feed Her"	3:52
5.	"Confession"	4:32
6.	"Elijah"	3:59
7.	"Liquid Gold 25"	4:27
8.	"August Moon"	4:54
9.	"Home Tapes"	4:57
10.	"Zathura"	4:07
11.	"Fairy in a Bottle"	5:17
12.	"Sertraline"	2:13
Total length:		46:29

== Charts ==
=== Weekly charts ===
Weekly chart performance for In Limerance
Chart (2025)	Peak position
Scottish Albums (Official Charts)	3
UK Albums Sales (OCC)	7
UK Folk Albums (Official Charts)	3

== Personnel ==
Credits adapted from Tidal.

- Jacob Alon – guitar (tracks 1–9, 11, 12), lute (1), vocals (2–8), synthesizer (2, 5, 9, 12), bass (2, 5), piano (3–5, 7, 9–11), pump organ (3), Wurlitzer organ (4), keyboards (7), Mellotron (8), percussion (10), kalimba (12)
- Dan Carey – production, mixing (all tracks); synthesizer (2, 3, 5, 7, 8, 10, 11), percussion (2, 3, 5), drum machine (2, 4, 7, 8), bass (3, 8), guitar (3, 10), drum programming (3)
- Christian Wright – mastering
- Alexis Smith – engineering
- Yuri Shibuichi – drums (2–5, 7, 8, 10)
- Celeste – background vocals (3)
- Rory Fotheringham – trumpet (7)
- Morgan Morris – percussion, piano (10)
- Joe Hathway – viola (12)
