= Peach Fur =

Australian rock band

- Origin: Gold Coast, Australia
- Genres: Rock and roll, Psychedelic, punk, hip-hop, reggae
- Years active: 2015–2024
- Labels: Independent
- Website: peachfur.band

Peach Fur was an Australian rock band formed in 2015. Band members included Mikey Woodworth (drums), Denny Hilder (vocals, guitar), Ben Crichton (lead guitar) and Liam Ward (bass, vocals). Peach Fur lists artists such as Pink Floyd, King Krule, Jurassic 5, and the Red Hot Chili Peppers as their musical influences.

== Career ==
=== 2015–2024: EPs and Earth Radio ===
Peach Fur's debut studio album Earth Radio was released in 2023 following a series of extended plays (EPs). The album featured a variety of genres including jazz and disco. The album concept for Earth Radio imagined extraterrestrials sampling Earth's musical genres. The lead singles, Yummy and Sun Rays, received positive reception.

In November 2024, the band announced their indefinite hiatus via social media. This was immediately followed by an announcement of their last farewell show on New Year Eve of 2025 at Coolangatta Hotel, Australia.

=== Touring ===
Peach Fur toured throughout Australia and Europe and performed at several festivals, including Spilt Milk.

== Discography ==
=== Albums ===
List of albums, with selected details
Title	Details
Earth Radio	Released: July 2023; Label: Peach Fur; Format: digital, LP

=== EPs ===
List of EPs, with selected details
Title	Details
Pleasures & Necessities	Released: September 2015; Label: Peach Fur; Format: digital
Doreen Drive	Released: May 2018; Label: Peach Fur; Format: digital
Awake	Released: May 2020; Label: Peach Fur; Format: digital, LP

== Awards ==
Peach Fur won the Live Act of the Year at the 2021 Gold Coast Music Awards. The band also won the Triple J Unearthed's Spilt Milk competition in 2022.

In November 2022, Peach Fur were featured as the Triple J Unearthed Featured Artist.
