= Griff (singer) =

British singer (born 2001)

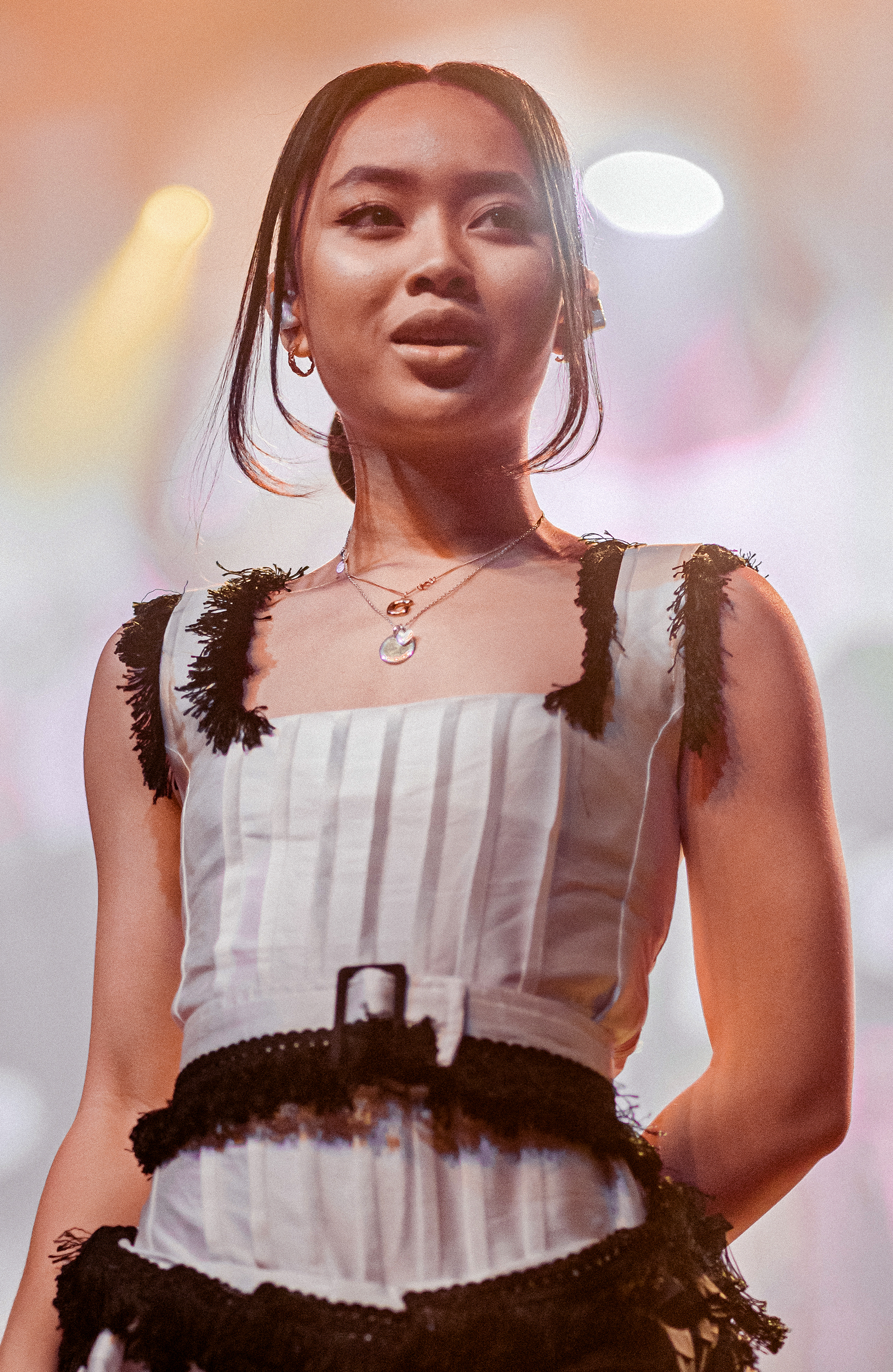
- Griff at Fonda Theatre in 2022
- Born: Sarah Faith Griffiths; 21 January 2001 (age 25); Kings Langley, Hertfordshire, England
- Occupations: Singer; songwriter
- Years active: 2019–present
- Awards: Brit Award for Rising Star (2021)
- Musical career
- Genres: R&B; pop
- Instrument: Vocals
- Label: Warner
- Website: officialgriff.com

Sarah Faith Griffiths (born 21 January 2001), known professionally as Griff, is an English singer-songwriter. In 2019, she released her debut single, "Mirror Talk", through Warner Records. This was followed by her debut extended play of the same name, released later that year. Griff was named the Rising Star at the 2021 Brit Awards, becoming one of the youngest winners in the category at 20.

Later in 2021, she released her debut mixtape, One Foot in Front of the Other, to commercial success and critical acclaim. On 12 July 2024, Griff released her debut studio album, Vertigo, which peaked at number three on the UK Albums Chart.

== Early life and education ==
Griff was born on 21 January 2001 as Sarah Faith Griffiths, in Kings Langley, Hertfordshire. Her father Mark Griffiths is the son of Jamaican immigrants who were part of the "Windrush generation" and her mother Kim is a first-generation migrant whose family moved to England amid the Vietnam War. Griff has stated that she feels "more in touch with my Chinese side". Griff's parents foster children and her experiences with the children were reflected in her single "Good Stuff".

Griff stated that her earliest memory of loving music was being given an iPod Shuffle with the Taylor Swift album Fearless (2008) downloaded to it, when she was around the age of eight. She then taught herself to record and produce music on her older brother's laptop and used tutorials on YouTube to inform her on techniques. While attending St Clement Danes School, Griff kept her musical life private, because she didn't know if she would be successful, stating: "no one likes that person at school who talks about how they want to sing". After finishing her A Levels, she told teachers that she was taking a gap year, rather than informing them of her music ventures. On using the stage name Griff, she stated: "Sarah Griffiths isn't that glamorous, I sound like I have a mortgage and 4 kids, it's very corporate".

Raised an evangelical Christian, Griff has said of her own faith: "I guess if you grow up with Christian parents, you get to a point where you ask: “Okay, do I actually believe or am I just going through the motions?” And from a young age I felt like it was something I actually do believe and so it’s always been something that I’ve owned."

== Career ==
On 4 July 2019, it was announced that Griff had been signed to Warner Records. On the same day, she released her debut single "Mirror Talk", accompanied by a music video. Annie Mac featured the song on BBC Radio 1 under the New Name playlist. She stated that the writing process for the song took an hour. Griff described the release as a career highlight, since it was released immediately after she had finished her A Level exams. Billboard described the song as an "electrifying debut", and praised her "powerful voice and vulnerable lyrics". In August 2019, Griff released her follow-up single, "Didn't Break It Enough", accompanied by a music video in which the clothing worn was made by Griff herself. She released the single "Paradise" in October 2019, which was followed by the release of her debut extended play, The Mirror Talk, on 15 November 2019. In December 2019, Griff released a cover of the Bangles' 1989 song "Eternal Flame".

Griff performing at Fonda Theatre in February 2022

On 7 February 2020, Griff released the single "Good Stuff". Despite people thinking the song is about a romantic breakup, she clarified that the subject of the song is about missing children that her family fostered, since they felt like siblings. In March 2020, a song titled "I Love You's", that Griff co-wrote, was released by American singer Hailee Steinfeld. This was followed by "Forgive Myself", a song released by Griff on 29 May 2020, described by NME as an "anthem". In July 2020, Griff was nominated by The Ivors Academy for an Ivor Novello Rising Star Award, and later that month, she released the song "Say It Again". In October 2020, she was part of two collaborative songs; "1,000,000 X Better" with English band Honne, and "Inside Out", a song with German DJ Zedd. In January 2021, she released "Black Hole", which NME described as a "dark pop anthem". On 19 March 2021, Griff won the Brit Award for Rising Star and performed "Black Hole" at the 2021 ceremony. Later that day, she announced details of her debut mixtape, One Foot in Front of the Other, which was released on 18 June 2021. Two months later, Griff followed up the mixtape with single "One Night". In October 2021, she embarked on a tour across the United Kingdom in support of her mixtape. She later did European and North American tour dates.

In November 2021, Dua Lipa announced Griff as one of her three supporting acts for the European dates of the Future Nostalgia Tour in 2022. In September 2022, she performed on eight dates of the +–=÷× Tour by Ed Sheeran. In 2023, she also took part in the Music of the Spheres World Tour by British band Coldplay as opening act for a few European dates including Portugal, Switzerland, Denmark, Sweden and the Netherlands.

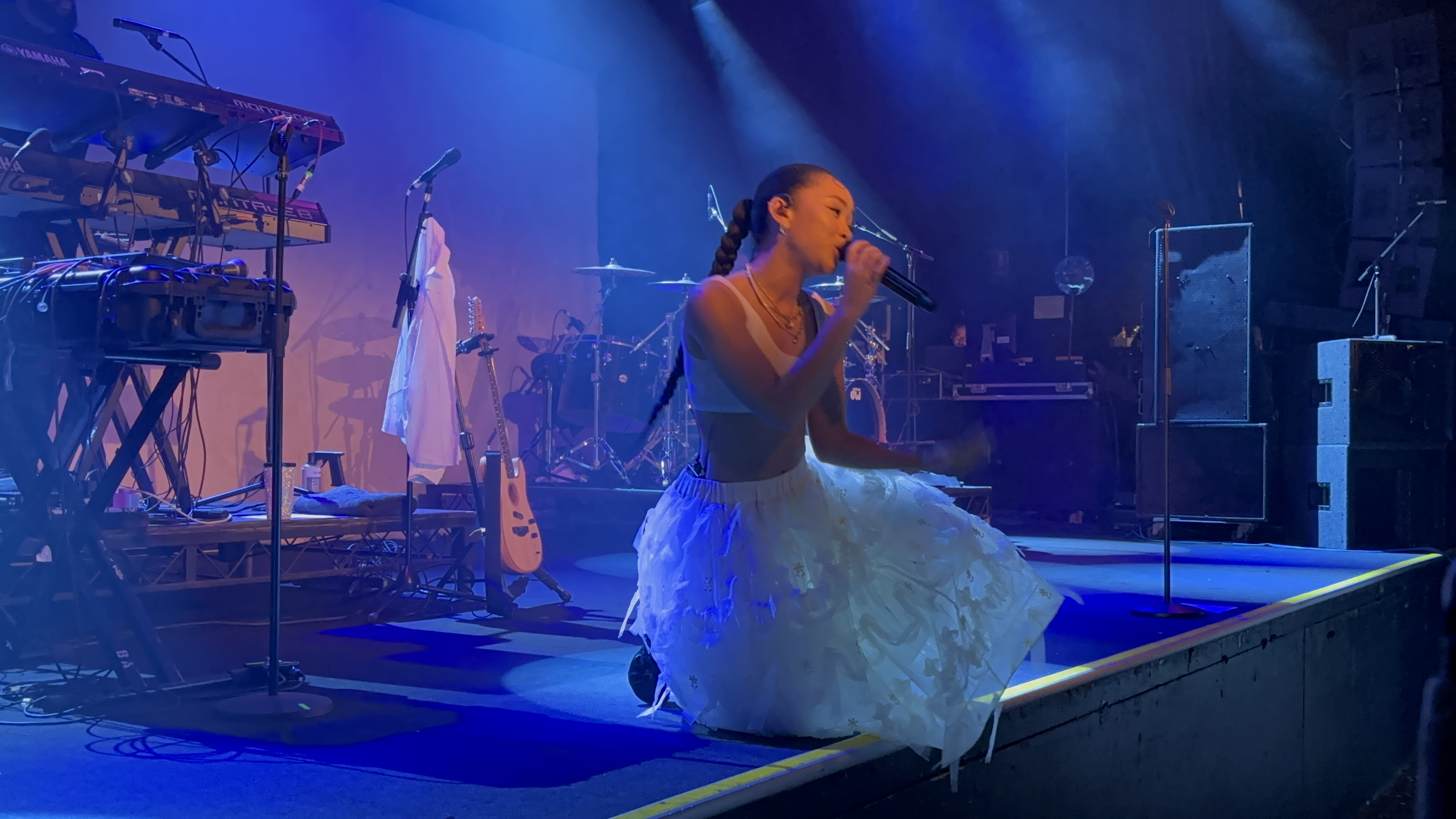
Griff performing in Sydney, Australia in January 2024.

In August 2023, after a break from music whilst on the Future Nostalgia Tour, Griff released the single "Vertigo". The song was promoted by Taylor Swift on Instagram, who said she "loved" the song. She released an EP to support the single, Vert1go Vol. 1, in October 2023. Later that month, Griff announced her single "Astronaut", which was written in collaboration with Coldplay lead vocalist Chris Martin and released in December. She released a third single "Miss Me Too" in February 2024, followed by an EP, ver2igo vol.2 in April 2024. On 12 July 2024, Griff released her debut album, Vertigo, to generally positive reviews from critics. In November 2024, Griff released a new single "Last Night's Mascara".

On 20 June 2024, Griff was announced as an opener for Sabrina Carpenter's Short n' Sweet Tour. On 22 June 2024, Griff opened for Taylor Swift as part of the Eras Tour in London alongside Paramore. Griff contributed a cover of "She's Not There" to the soundtrack of the Amazon Prime series My Lady Jane.

== Discography ==
=== Albums ===
List of studio albums, with release date, and label shown
Title	Album details	Peak chart positions				
Title	Album details	UK	AUS	GER	IRE	SCO
Vertigo	Released: 12 July 2024; Label: Warner; Format: CD, LP, cassette, digital download, streaming	3	27	75	93	2

=== Mixtapes ===
List of mixtapes, with release date, selected chart positions, and label shown
Title	Mixtape details	Peak chart positions		
Title	Mixtape details	UK	IRE	SCO
One Foot in Front of the Other	Released: 18 June 2021; Label: Warner; Format: CD, LP, cassette, digital download, streaming media	4	85	5

=== Extended plays ===
List of EPs, with release date and label shown
Title	EP details
The Mirror Talk	Released: 15 November 2019; Label: Warner; Format: Digital download, streaming
Vert1go Vol. 1	Released: 20 October 2023; Label: Warner; Format: Digital download, streaming
Ver2igo Vol. 2	Released: 5 April 2024; Label: Warner; Format: Digital download, streaming

=== Singles ===
List of singles, with year released, selected chart positions, certifications, and album name shown
Title	Year	Peak chart positions					Certifications	Album
Title	Year	UK	BEL (FL) Tip	IRE	NZ Hot	NOR	Certifications	Album
"Mirror Talk"	2019	—	—	—	—	—		The Mirror Talk
"Didn't Break It Enough"	2019	—	—	—	—	—		The Mirror Talk
"Paradise"	2019	—	—	—	—	—		The Mirror Talk
"Eternal Flame"	2019	—	—	—	—	—		Non-album singles
"Good Stuff"	2020	—	—	—	—	—		Non-album singles
"Forgive Myself"	2020	—	—	—	—	—		Non-album singles
"Say It Again"	2020	—	—	—	—	—		Non-album singles
"1,000,000 X Better" (with Honne)	2020	—	—	—	—	—		Non-album singles
"Inside Out" (with Zedd)	2020	—	—	—	—	—		Non-album singles
"Black Hole"	2021	18	28	25	16	—	BPI: Gold; ARIA: Gold	One Foot in Front of the Other
"One Foot in Front of the Other"	2021	— (Note: "One Foot in Front of the Other" did not enter the UK Singles Chart, but peaked at number forty-five on the UK Singles Downloads Chart.)	—	—	—	—		One Foot in Front of the Other
"Shade of Yellow"	2021	—	—	—	26	—		One Foot in Front of the Other
"One Night"	2021	45	—	85	—	—	BPI: Silver	Non-album singles
"Head on Fire" (with Sigrid)	2022	44	—	—	35	33		Non-album singles
"Vertigo"	2023	84	—	—	23	—		Vertigo (Note: "Vertigo" is also included on the Vert1go Vol.1 while "Miss Me Too" is also included on Ver2igo Vol. 2.)
"Astronaut"	2023	—	—	—	—	—		Vertigo
"Miss Me Too"	2024	—	—	—	22	—		Vertigo
"Anything"	2024	—	—	—	—	—		Vertigo
"It Could Have Been Us" (with Christopher)	2024	—	—	—	—	—		Fools Gold
"Yesterday, Today & Tomorrow" (with Aodhán King)	2024	—	—	—	—	—		Non-album singles
"Pure Imagination"	2024	—	—	—	—	—		Non-album singles
"Last Night's Mascara"	2024	57	—	73	5	—		Vertigo (Tour edition)
"In the Name of Healing"	2026	—	—	—	—	—		Your Fault: London
"—" denotes a recording that did not chart or was not released in that territory.

=== Other singles ===
List of other singles, with year released, selected chart positions
Title	Year	Peak chart positions		Album
Title	Year	UK	BEL (FL) Tip	Album
"Love Is a Compass" (Disney supporting Make-A-Wish)	2020	42	9	Non-album single

=== Music videos ===
Title	Year	Director(s)
"Mirror Talk"	2019	Sylvie Weber
"Didn't Break It Enough"	2019	Rory DCS
"Paradise"	2019	Unknown
"Good Stuff"	2020	Imogen Snell and Riccardo Castaneo
"Forgive Myself"	2020	Imogen Snell and Riccardo Castaneo
"Love is a Compass"	2020	Maria Goulamhoussen
"Say It Again"	2020	Stephen Isaac-Wilson
"Black Hole"	2021	Joe Shaw and Eseosa Ohen (SOB)
"One Foot in Front of the Other"	2021	Stephen Isaac-Wilson
"One Night"	2021	ABCDCD
"Head on Fire"	2022	CC Wade
"Miss Me Too"	2024	Colin Solal Cardo

=== Songwriting credits ===
Title	Artist	Year	Album	Notes
"I Love You's"	Hailee Steinfeld	2020	Half Written Story	Co-writer
"Angry Man"	Kawala	2021	Paradise Heights	Co-writer
"Happy Hunting Ground"	Maisie Peters	2021	Trying: Season 2	Co-writer, performer
"Minute"	Kim Petras	2023	Feed the Beast	Co-writer

== Tours ==
=== Headlining ===
==== 2024 Tour ====
Date	City	Country	Venue	Opening Act
2 January 2024	Brisbane	Australia	Fortitude Music Hall	
3 January 2024	Sydney	Australia	The Metro Theatre	
6 February 2024	Los Angeles	United States	The Roxy Theatre	
9 February 2024	New York City	United States	(Le) Poisson Rouge	
10 March 2024	Stockholm	Sweden	Debaser Strand	Amanda Cy
11 March 2024	Oslo	Norway	Parkteatret Scene	Amanda Cy
12 March 2024	Copenhagen	Denmark	VEGA	Amanda Cy
15 March 2024	Hamburg	Germany	Mojo Club	CXLOE
16 March 2024	Berlin	Germany	Heimathafen Neukölln	CXLOE
18 March 2024	Cologne	Germany	Gloria	CXLOE
19 March 2024	Amsterdam	Netherlands	Tolhuistuin	CXLOE
21 March 2024	Brussels	Belgium	Botanique - Orangerie	CXLOE
22 March 2024	Paris	France	La Machine du Moulin Rouge	CXLOE
24 March 2024	Bournemouth	United Kingdom	O2 Academy Bournemouth	CXLOE
26 March 2024	Dublin	Ireland	3Olympia Theatre	CXLOE
28 March 2024	Manchester	United Kingdom	Albert Hall	CXLOE
30 March 2024	Glasgow	United Kingdom	Barrowland Ballroom	CXLOE
31 March 2024	Birmingham	United Kingdom	O2 Institute	CXLOE
2 April 2024	Camden, London	United Kingdom	Roundhouse	CXLOE

Vertigo World Tour

Date	City	Country	Venue	Opening Act
13 August 2024	Brisbane	Australia	Princess Theatre	Lyric
15 August 2024	Sydney	Australia	Enmore Theatre	
17 August 2024	Melbourne	Australia	Northcote Theatre	
19 August 2024	Auckland	New Zealand	Powerstation	
13 September 2024	Washington	United States	9:30 Club	
16 September 2024	Philadelphia	United States	Theatre of Living Arts	
17 September 2024	New York	United States	Terminal 5	
20 September 2024	Boston	United States	House of Blues	
21 September 2024	Montreal	Canada	Le National	
22 September 2024	Toronto	Canada	Danforth Music Hall	
24 September 2024	Detroit	United States	Saint Andrew's Hall	
26 September 2024	Chicago	United States	The Vic Theatre	
27 September 2024	Minneapolis	United States	First Avenue	
29 September 2024	Denver	United States	Ogden Theatre	
30 September 2024	Salt Lake City	United States	The Depot	
2 October 2024	Vancouver	Canada	Commodore Ballroom	
3 October 2024	Seattle	United States	Showbox SoDo	
4 October 2024	Portland	United States	Crystal Ballroom	
6 October 2024	San Francisco	United States	Regency Ballroom	
7 October 2024	Los Angeles	United States	The Wiltern	
9 October 2024	San Diego	United States	The Observatory North Park	
10 October 2024	Tempe	United States	The Van Buren	
8 November 2024	Glasgow	United Kingdom	O2 Academy	
9 November 2024	Birmingham	United Kingdom	O2 Academy	
10 November 2024	Bristol	United Kingdom	O2 Academy	
12 November 2024	Manchester	United Kingdom	Manchester Academy	
13 November 2024	London	United Kingdom	Alexandra Palace	
16 November 2024	Paris	France	Élysée Montmartre	
18 November 2024	Cologne	Germany	Carlswerk Victoria	
19 November 2024	Amsterdam	The Netherlands	Paradiso	
20 November 2024	Antwerp	Belgium	De Roma	
22 November 2024	Hamburg	Germany	Docks	
24 November 2024	Berlin	Germany	Huxleys	
25 November 2024	Copenhagen	Denmark	Vega	
27 November 2024	Munich	Germany	Theaterfabrik	
29 November 2024	Lausanne	Switzerland	Les Docks	
30 November 2024	Milan	Italy	Magazzini Generali	
2 December 2024	Barcelona	Spain	Razzmatazz	
3 December 2024	Madrid	Spain	La Riviera	

=== Supporting ===
- Dua Lipa - Future Nostalgia Tour (2022)
- Ed Sheeran - +–=÷× Tour (2022)
- Coldplay - Music of the Spheres World Tour (2022─23)
- Taylor Swift - The Eras Tour (2024)
- Sabrina Carpenter - Short n' Sweet Tour (2024)
- Gracie Abrams - The Secret of Us Tour (2025)

== Awards and nominations ==
Organisation	Year	Category	Nominated work	Result	Ref.
BBC	2021	Sound of 2021	Herself	Fifth	
Brit Awards	2021	Rising Star	Herself	Won	
MTV UK	2021	Push One to Watch	Herself	Nominated	
LOS40 Music Awards	2021	Best International New Act	Herself	Won	
MTV Europe Music Awards	2021	Best New	Herself	Nominated	
MTV Europe Music Awards	2021	Best Push	Herself	Nominated	
BBC Radio 1	2021	Hottest Record of the Year	"Black Hole"	Fifth	
Popjustice £20 Music Prize	2021	Best British Pop Single	"Black Hole"	Nominated	
Brit Awards	2022	Best New Artist	Herself	Nominated	
Brit Awards	2022	Best Pop/R&B Act	Herself	Nominated	
NME Awards	2022	NME Radar Award	Herself	Won	
NME Awards	2022	Best Collaboration	"Head on Fire" (with Sigrid)	Won	
Ticketmaster New Music Award	2022	New Music Award	Herself	Won	
