= Vertigo (Griff album) =

2024 studio album by Griff

- Standard cover

Studio album by Griff
- Released: July 12, 2024
- Studios: Tottenham Studios (London); The Round House Studio (London); Eastcote Studios (London); Archer Music (Memphis); Astro Studios (Atlanta); Power Sound Studio (Amsterdam); Cirkut City (Los Angeles); Archer Close Studio (London); Traxton Studios (Stockholm); Sam's Nana's House (London); Neverland Studios (London); Wendy House Studio (London); Beethoven Studio (London)
- Genre: Synth-pop
- Length: 44:07
- Label: Warner
- Producers: Griff; Sam Tsang; Lostboy; Siba; Bill Rahko; Cirkut; Connor McDonough; Mura Masa

Griff chronology
Ver2igo Vol. 2 (2024)	Vertigo (2024)

Singles from Vertigo
- 1. "Vertigo" Released: 31 August 2023; 2. "Astronaut" Released: 6 December 2023; 3. "Miss Me Too" Released: 28 February 2024; 4. "Anything" Released: 21 June 2024; 5. "Last Night's Mascara" Released: 8 November 2024

Vertigo is the debut studio album by the British singer-songwriter Griff, released on 12 July 2024, through Warner Records. It follows Griff's EPs Vert1go Vol. 1 (2023) and Ver2igo Vol. 2 (2024), which collectively make up the album alongside six additional tracks. The album's lead single and title track, "Vertigo", was released on 31 August 2023. The single was followed by the release of "Miss Me Too" and "Anything". It peaked at number three on the UK Albums Chart.

== Background and conception ==
Following the release of Griff's mixtape One Foot in Front of the Other, she spent the next two years opening for prominent artists such as Dua Lipa, Ed Sheeran, and Coldplay. During her time on tour with Coldplay, Griff began teasing new music through a series of social media posts on Instagram and TikTok. Among these teasers were the title track "Vertigo" and "19th Hour". Griff performed "Vertigo" while opening for Coldplay on their Music of the Spheres World Tour. On 17 August 2023, Griff announced that "Vertigo" would be released on 31 August 2023, accompanied by an exclusive visual debuting on MTV.

Upon its release, "Vertigo" received widespread acclaim and was notably shared by Taylor Swift via an Instagram story. Swift later brought Griff on as a support act for The Eras Tour.

On 17 September 2023, Griff began teasing a new extended play, later revealed as vert1go vol. 1, which was released on 20 October 2023. Griff described the EP as a collection of songs that are "fragile and insular and desperately heartbroken." vert1go vol. 1 initially included three tracks: the title track "Vertigo," "Into The Walls," and "19th Hour." Following the EP's release, Griff announced an additional track titled "Astronaut" on 23 November 2023. "Astronaut," a collaboration with Coldplay's Chris Martin who played piano on the track, was released on 6 December 2023.

In a live performance and Q&A event with fans on 12 December 2023 to celebrate vert1go vol. 1, Griff revealed that a companion extended play, known as Volume 2, would be released in 2024.

On 15 January 2024, Griff began teasing her new single "Miss Me Too," which was formally announced on 7 February 2024 and released on 28 February 2024. Griff described the song as the beginning of Volume 2. A music video for "Miss Me Too" was released on 15 March 2024.

Shortly after the release of "Miss Me Too," on 3 March 2024, Griff unveiled the follow-up extended play to vert1go vol. 1, titled ver2igo vol. 2. ver2igo vol. 2 was released on 5 April 2024 and included four tracks: "Miss Me Too," "Cycles," "Hole in my Pocket," and "Pillow in my Arms." Griff described the extended play as an energetic collection of songs that are "sad and euphoric all at the same time."

On 25 April 2024, Griff announced her debut studio album entitled Vertigo, originally set for release on 19 July 2024. Griff explained that "every song had been written from an emotional sense of vertigo – that dizzy upside-down sensation that heartache often leaves you with." Vertigo was to contain all the tracks from vert1go vol. 1 and ver2igo vol. 2, along with six additional tracks, making a total of fourteen tracks on the standard edition of the album.

To promote the album, Griff announced a world tour shortly after revealing the album.

On 21 June 2024, Griff released her fourth single from Vertigo, titled "Anything," which made its live performance debut on 22 June 2024 during Griff's supporting performance at The Eras Tour.

Following her supporting performance at The Eras Tour and the announcement that she would be supporting Sabrina Carpenter on her Short n' Sweet Tour, Griff announced that Vertigo would be released one week early on 12 July 2024.

On 3 July 2024, Griff announced that three additional tracks would be available exclusively on a HMV deluxe version of the album. These tracks included: "Broke Down On The Backstreet," "Eleven," and the original version of "Astronaut" before Chris Martin's involvement.

== Promotion and release ==
"The album is about vertigo as an emotion and the dizziness and upside down feeling of heartache. I wanted to drop this project in parts from insular low feelings (Vol. 1) to desperate euphoria (Vol. 2) and with volume three, the full story."

— Griff reflecting on the release strategy of Vertigo

Griff described Vertigo as an album that captures the sensation of "vertigo as an emotion and the dizziness and upside-down feeling of heartache." The album was released in three parts: Volume 1 as the Vert1go Vol. 1 extended play, Volume 2 as the Ver2igo Vol. 2 ep, and Volume 3 comprising six new songs included in the full album release. Griff described the journey through these volumes as a progression from "insular low feelings" in Volume 1 to "desperate euphoria" in Volume 2, culminating in Volume 3 where the "full story" is unveiled. Initially announced for release on July 19, 2024, the album's release date was later moved up to July 12, 2024.

=== Singles ===
The first single of the album "Vertigo" was released in August 2023, prior to the announcement of the Vert1go Vol. 1 extended play. The third single, "Miss Me Too" was released on 28 February 2024 to promote the Ver2igo Vol. 2 extended play. The fourth single, "Anything" was released on 21 June 2024. The promotional single "Astronaut" a Pop ballad featuring Chris Martin on piano, was released 6 December 2023.

=== Tours ===
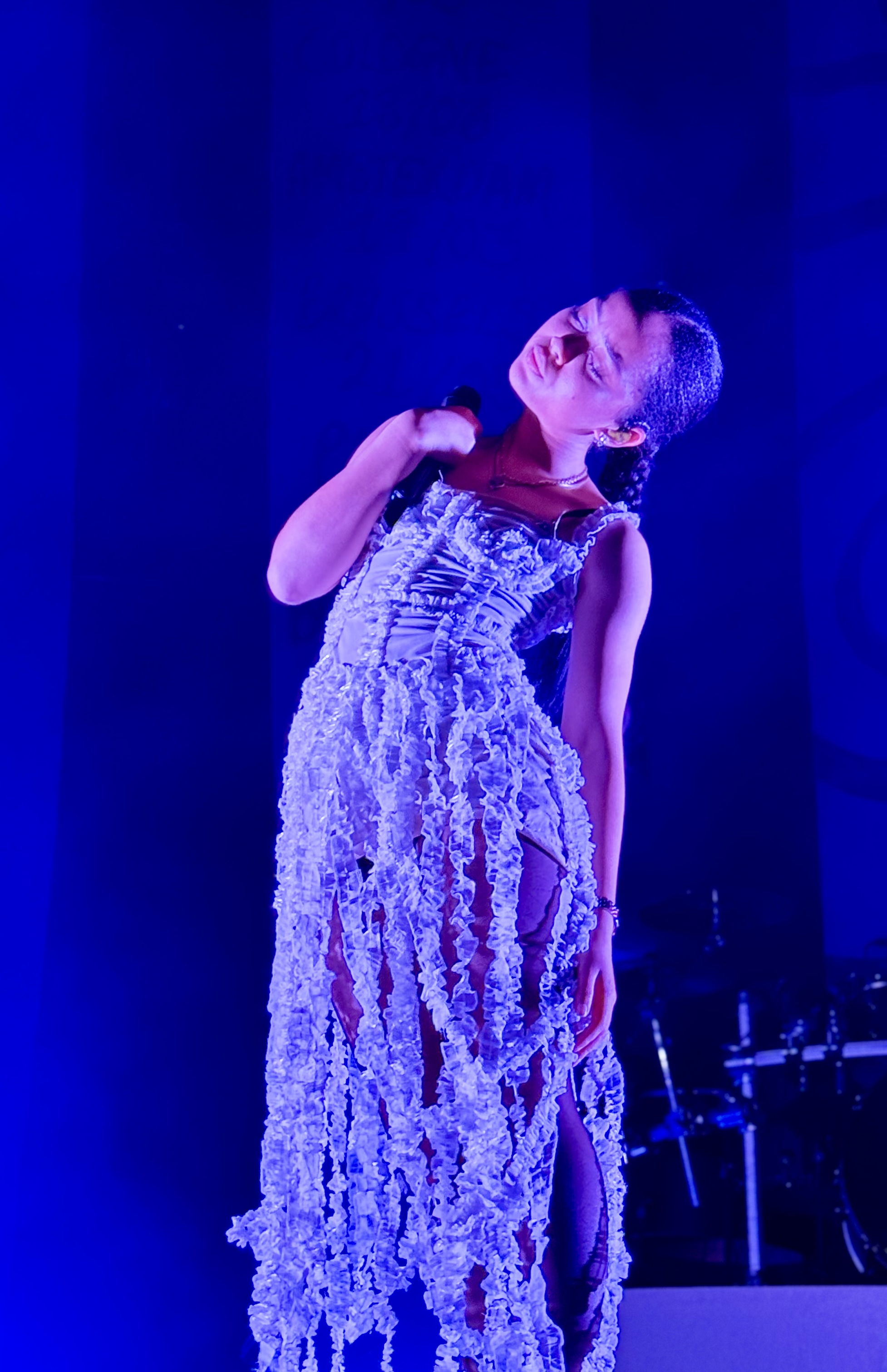
Griff performing in Manchester in 2024

After the release of Vert1go Vol. 1, Griff announced a headlining tour across Australia, the United States, and Europe to promote the release of Volume 1 and to perform unreleased tracks from Volume 2. The tour commenced on January 2, 2024, in Brisbane, Australia, and concluded on April 2, 2024, in London, United Kingdom. Cxloe and Amanda Cy were announced as the support acts for this headlining tour. Prior to the album release, Griff also joined Taylor Swift as a support act for a London date of The Eras Tour.

On the day of the Vertigo album announcement, Griff revealed plans for another tour in support of the album. This tour is set to begin on August 13, 2024, in Brisbane, Australia, and will end on December 3, 2024, in Madrid, Spain. Unlike the previous headlining tour, the Vertigo tour is scheduled to visit more cities across North America, Europe, and Australia, totalling 38 cities. Additionally, Griff will support Sabrina Carpenter on her Short n' Sweet world tour.

Griff also announced an acoustic tour to promote the release of Vertigo, visiting various small venues across the UK throughout July 2024.

== Critical reception ==
Professional ratings
Aggregate scores
Source	Rating
Metacritic	67/100
Review scores
Source	Rating
Clash	8/10
DIY	3.5/5 stars
i news	4/5 stars
NME	4/5 stars
Rolling Stone	4/5 stars
The Line of Best Fit	6/10
The Skinny	3/5 stars
The Times	3/5 stars

Vertigo received mostly positive reviews from music critics. At Metacritic, which assigns a normalised rating of 100 to reviews from mainstream critics, the album has an average score of 67, based on 6 reviews, indicating "generally favourable reviews".

Writing for Rolling Stone, Will Richards praised the album, highlighting Griff's ability to create powerful pop songs with emotional depth and clever songwriting. They noted that tracks like "Miss Me Too" and "Astronaut" showcase her knack for catchy yet poignant lyrics, drawing comparisons to artists like Taylor Swift and Lorde.

NME's Kayleigh Watson also commended the album for capturing the highs and lows of a young artist discovering her potential, with particular praise for the emotional intensity and production quality.

Otis Robinson of DIY Magazine, however, felt that while the album maintained Griff's pop brilliance, it occasionally spread itself too thin, with some tracks falling short of their potential. Despite this, they acknowledged the album's overall high quality and polished production.

In a more critical review from The Skinny, Lucy Fitzgerald pointed out that Vertigo sometimes struggles to establish a unique sound, describing some of its production as "hollow" and "monochromatic." They did, however, appreciate tracks like "Cycles" for their elegant simplicity and effectiveness.

== Track listing ==
Vertigo standard edition
No.	Title	Writer(s)	Producer(s)	Length
1.	"Vertigo"	Sarah Griffiths; Sam Tsang	Griff; Tsang; Two Inch Punch^{[a]}; Beau Nox^{[a]}; Thom Bridges^{[a]}	3:00
2.	"Miss Me Too"	Griffiths; Frederik Castenschiold Eichen; Peter Rycroft	Griff; Lostboy; Siba	3:02
3.	"Into the Walls"	Griffiths; Eichen; Rycroft; James Stack^{[b]}	Griff; Tsang; Lostboy; Siba	3:09
4.	"19th Hour"	Griffiths; Tsang; Rycroft	Griff; Lostboy; Tsang^{[a]}	3:30
5.	"Astronaut"	Griffiths	Griff; Tsang; Bill Rahko	3:35
6.	"Anything"	Griffiths; Connor McDonough; Henry Walter	Griff; Tsang; Cirkut; McDonough	3:05
7.	"Pillow in My Arms"	Griffiths	Griff	3:16
8.	"Cycles"	Griffiths; Alexander Crossan; Minna Koivisto; Tsang; Vera Carlbom	Mura Masa; Tsang	2:59
9.	"Tears for Fun"	Griffiths; Salem Al Fakir; Tsang; Fred Vincent Pontare	Griff; Tsang; Vargas & Lagola^{[a]}	3:16
10.	"Hiding Alone"	Griffiths; Tsang	Tsang	3:48
11.	"Hole in My Pocket"	Griffiths; Rycroft	Griff; Lostboy	2:40
12.	"Everlasting"	Griffiths	Griff; Tsang; Siba	2:54
13.	"So Fast"	Griffiths; Eichen; Rycroft	Lostboy; Siba	2:30
14.	"Where Did You Go"	Griffiths; Eichen; Rycroft	Griff; Lostboy; Siba; Tsang^{[a]}	3:23
Total length:				44:07

Vertigo HMV exclusive edition
No.	Title	Writer(s)	Producer(s)	Length
15.	"Broke Down on the Backstreet"	Griffiths; Tsang	Griff; Tsang	2:15
16.	"Eleven"	Griffiths; Christian Beau Anastasiou	Griff; Beau Nox	2:52
17.	"Astronaut" (original version)	Griffiths	Griff; Tsang	2:59
Total length:				53:13

Vertigo iTunes exclusive bonus tracks
No.	Title	Writer(s)	Producer(s)	Length
15.	"Do It Again" (demo)	Griffiths	Griff	2:17
16.	"Lastnightsmascara" (demo)	Griffiths	Griff	2:41
Total length:				49:05

Vertigo (Tour edition)
No.	Title	Length
1.	"Last Night's Mascara"	2:57
2.	"Last Night's Mascara" (Live from Alexandra Palace; featuring Aziya)	2:45
3.	"Vertigo" (Live from Alexandra Palace)	4:19
4.	"Miss Me Too" (Live from Alexandra Palace)	3:28
5.	"Astronaut" (Live from Alexandra Palace)	4:29
6.	"Tears for Fun" (Live from Alexandra Palace)	4:33
Total length:		66:38

Notes

- ^{^[a]}signifies an additional producer
- ^{^[b]}not visible to Digital Service Providers (DSPs)
- Physical editions of the standard album include "So Fast (Live in London)" as opposed to the studio version.
- "Do It Again", "Lastnightsmascara", and "Last Night's Mascara" are stylised in all lowercase.

== Personnel ==
Musicians

- Sarah Griffiths – vocals, synthesiser (1, 4, 6, 7, 12, 17), keyboard (1, 4, 6, 7, 12, 16, 17), programming (1, 6, 12, 17), piano (3, 5, 15), guitar (13)
- Sam Tsang – keyboard (1, 3–5, 10, 12, 17), programming (1, 3–5, 10, 12, 17), synthesiser (1, 3–5, 8, 12, 14, 17), guitar (1, 3–5, 10, 12), bass (1, 3–5, 10, 12), drums (1, 3–5, 17), background vocals (15), piano (15)
- Ben Ash – synthesiser (1)
- Frederik Castenschiold Eichen – keyboard (2, 12), synthesiser (2, 13), guitar (13), piano (2), programming (12)
- Peter Rycroft – keyboard (2–4, 11, 13, 14), programming (2–4, 11, 13, 14), bass (2–4, 11), guitar (2, 11)
- Chris Martin – piano (5)
- Henry Russell Walter – keyboard (6), programming (6)
- Alexander George Edward Crossan – guitar (8), synthesiser (8)
- Nina Lim – strings (9), string arrangements (9)
- Vargas and Lagola – guitar (9), synthesiser (9)
- Reverend Beanz – bass guitar (10)
- Christian Beau Anastasiou Astrop – drums (16), keyboard (16), synthesiser (16)

Technical

- Sarah Griffiths – engineering (4, 7, 12, 17), drum programming (6, 7, 12)
- Sam Tsang – engineering (1, 3, 8–10, 12, 14, 15, 17), drum programming (17), mixing (17)
- Christian Beau Anastasiou Astrop – engineering (16)
- Thom Bridges – mixing (1)
- Matt Colton – mastering (1–14)
- Dan Grech-Marguerat – mixing (2–7, 9–13)
- Charles Haydon Hicks – mixing assistance (2–7, 9–13)
- Luke Burgoyne – mixing assistance (2–7, 9–13)
- Peter Rycroft – drum programming (2, 3, 4, 11, 14), engineering (2, 11, 14), bass programming (3, 4)
- Paul Pouwer – engineering (5)
- Henry Russell Walter – engineering (6)
- Alexander George Edward Crossan – drum programming (8)
- Nathan Boddy – mixing (8)
- Jay Reynolds – mixing (14), mixing assistance (16), mastering (16)
- Kevin Vanbergen – mastering (15, 17), mixing (15)

== Charts ==
Chart performance for Vertigo
Chart (2024)	Peak position
Australian Albums (ARIA)	27
Belgian Albums (Ultratop Flanders)	198
German Albums (Offizielle Top 100)	75
Hungarian Physical Albums (MAHASZ)	14
Irish Albums (IRMA)	93
Scottish Albums (Official Charts)	2
UK Albums (Official Charts)	3

== Release history ==
Vertigo release history
Region	Date	Format(s)	Edition(s)	Label	Ref.
Various	12 July 2024	Digital download; streaming	Standard	Warner	
Various	12 July 2024	Cassette; CD; vinyl LP	Standard	Warner	
United Kingdom	12 July 2024	CD	HMV-exclusive	Warner	
Various	17 July 2024	Digital download	Bonus Edition	Warner	
Various	6 December 2024	Digital download; streaming	Tour Edition	Warner	
