= Black bear =

Black bear or Blackbear may refer to:

== Animals ==
- American black bear (Ursus americanus), a North American bear species
- Asian black bear (Ursus thibetanus), an Asian bear species

== Arts and entertainment ==
- Black Bear (band), a Canadian First Nations group
- Blackbear (musician), stage name of American musician Matthew Musto (born 1990)
- Black Bear (album), 2013, by Andrew Belle
- Black Bear (film), a 2020 American thriller drama film

== People ==
- Black Bear (chief), Arapaho leader
- Blackbear Bosin (1921–1980), Comanche-Kiowa sculptor and painter
- Peter Blackbear (1899–1976), American professional football player

== Places in the United States ==
- Black Bear, California, an unincorporated community, formerly a mining town
- Black Bear Creek, Oklahoma
- Black Bear Resort, Idaho

== Sports ==
=== United States ===
- Berkshire Black Bears, a former minor league baseball team
- Binghamton Black Bears, a minor league ice hockey team
- Maine Black Bears, the athletic teams representing the University of Maine
- West Virginia Black Bears, a minor league baseball team

=== Canada ===
- Ottawa Black Bears, a professional box lacrosse team

== Other uses ==
- Black Bear Road, a jeep trail in Colorado
