= Brit Award for Rising Star =

British musical award

Critics’ Choice Award
- Country: United Kingdom (UK)
- Presented by: British Phonographic Industry (BPI)
- First award: 2008
- Currently held by: Jacob Alon (2026)
- Website: brits.co.uk

The Critics’ Choice Award (previously Rising Star Award) is an award given by the British Phonographic Industry (BPI), an organisation which represents record companies and artists in the United Kingdom. The accolade is presented at the Brit Awards, an annual celebration of British and international music. The winners and nominees are determined by the Brit Awards voting academy with over one-thousand members comprising record labels, publishers, managers, agents, media, and previous winners and nominees.

The nominees are British artists who the academy believe will make the biggest impact on music in the coming year. The award was first presented at the 28th Brit Awards in 2008 to Adele and has been awarded annually since. Tom Odell was the first male recipient, winning in 2013. Jacob Alon is the current holder of the award, winning in 2026.

== Winners and nominees ==
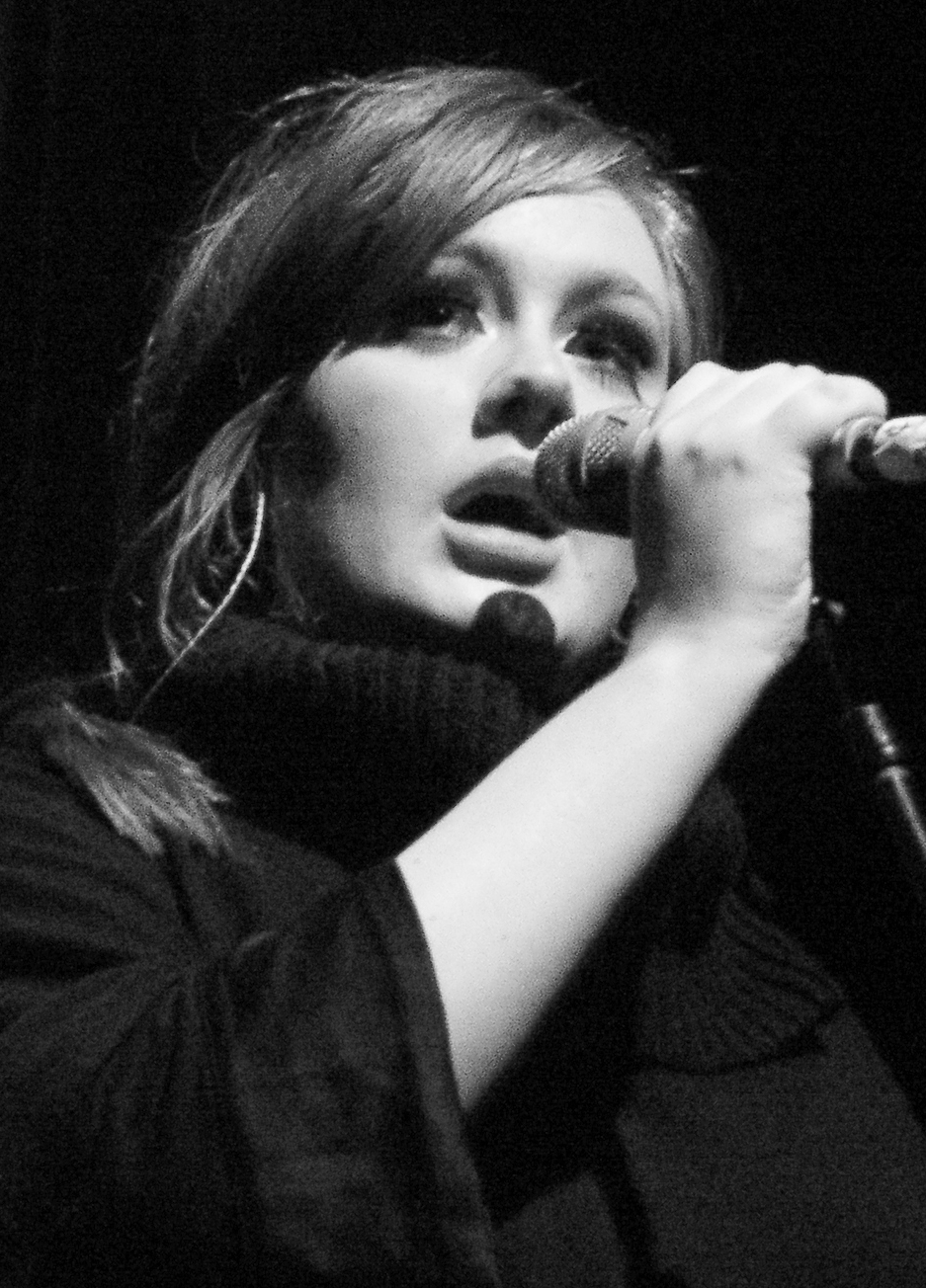
Inaugural winner Adele

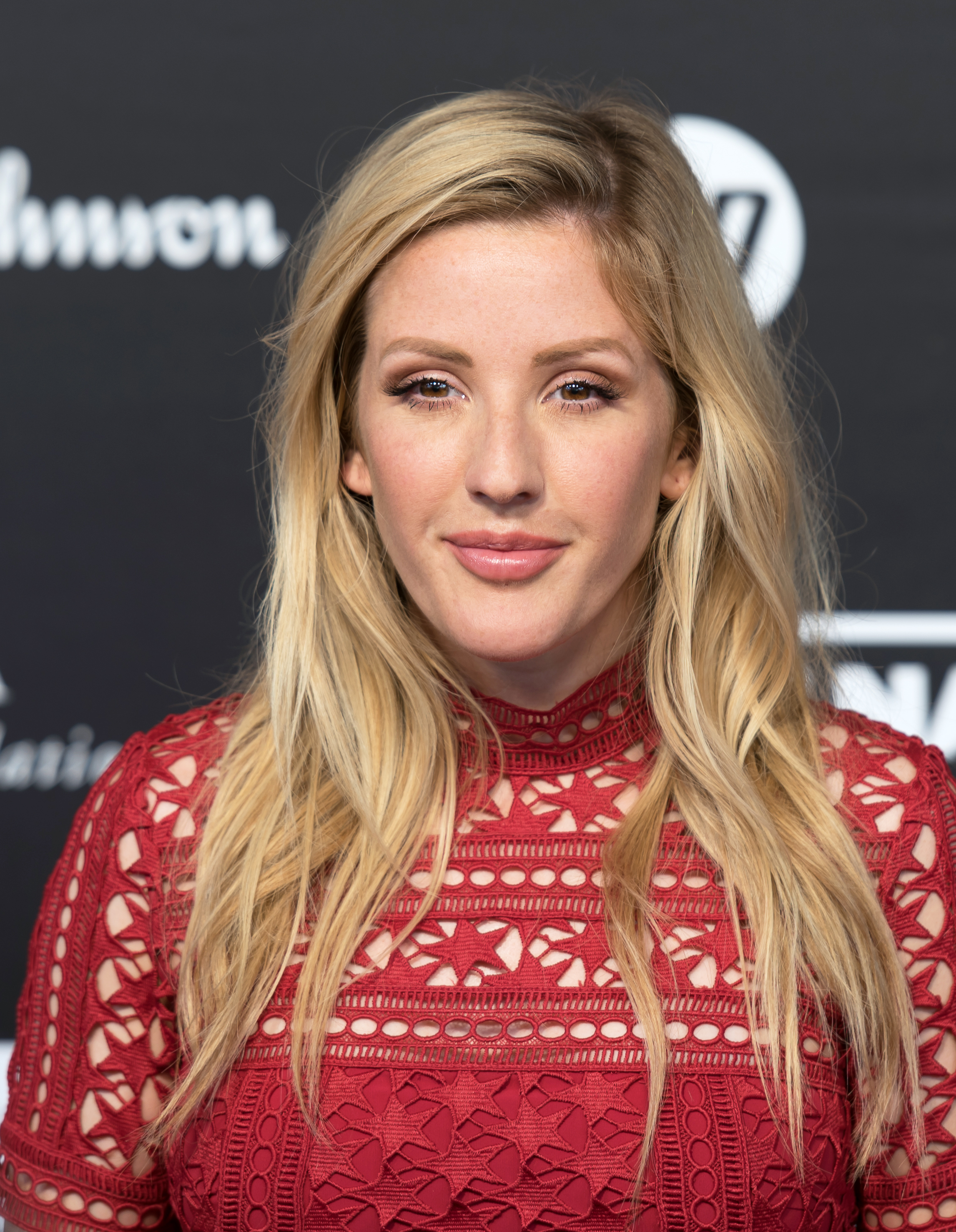
2010 winner Ellie Goulding also won British Female Solo Artist

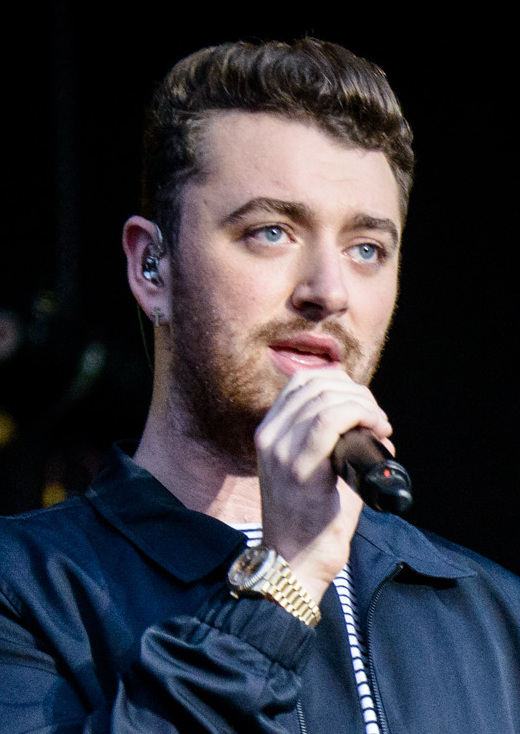
2014 winner Sam Smith also won Best New Artist

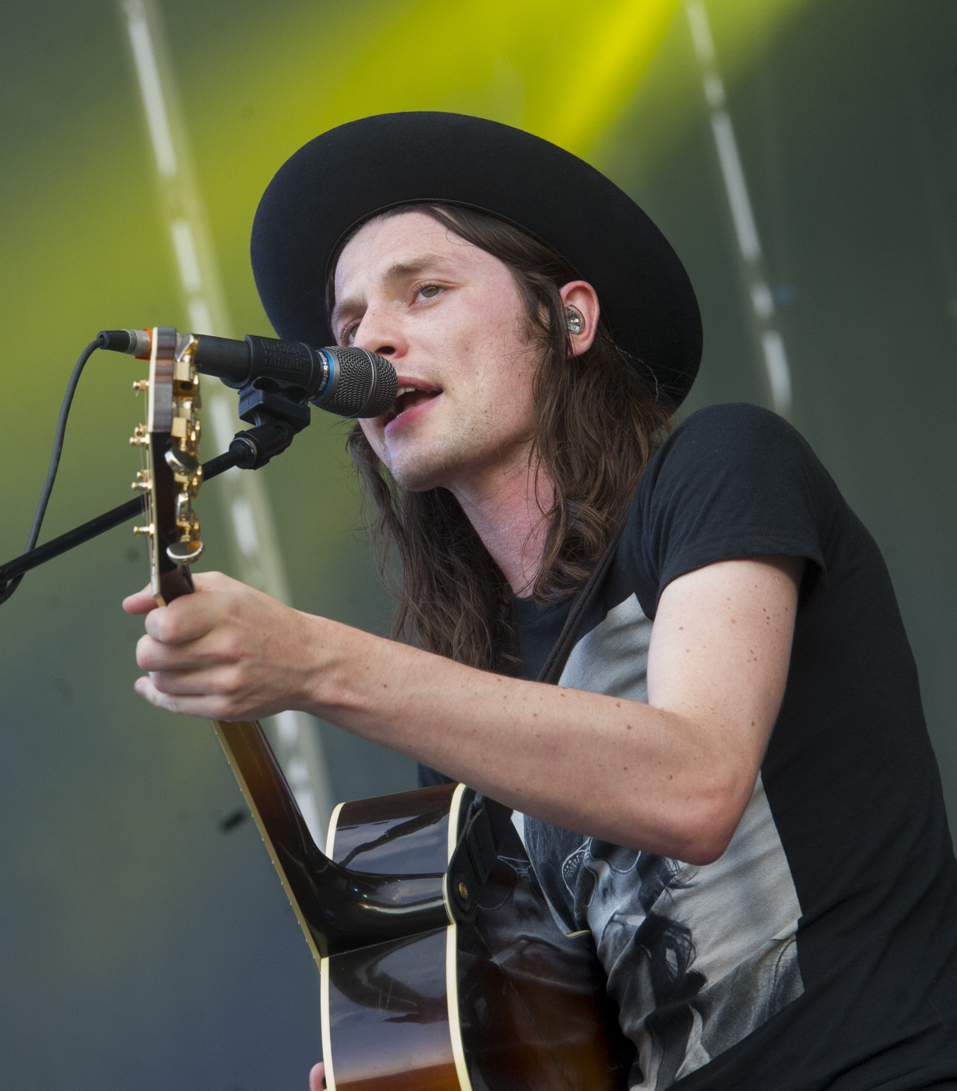
2015 winner James Bay also won British Male Solo Artist

Year	Image	Recipient	Nominees	Ref.
2008 (28th)		Adele	Duffy; Foals	
2009 (29th)		Florence and the Machine	Little Boots; White Lies	
2010 (30th)		Ellie Goulding	Delphic; Marina and the Diamonds	
2011 (31st)		Jessie J	James Blake; The Vaccines	
2012 (32nd)		Emeli Sandé	Michael Kiwanuka; Maverick Sabre	
2013 (33rd)		Tom Odell	AlunaGeorge; Laura Mvula	
2014 (34th)		Sam Smith	Ella Eyre; Chlöe Howl	
2015 (35th)		James Bay	George the Poet; Years & Years	
2016 (36th)		Jack Garratt	Izzy Bizu; Frances	
2017 (37th)		Rag'n'Bone Man	Anne-Marie; Dua Lipa	
2018 (38th)		Jorja Smith	Stefflon Don; Mabel	
2019 (39th)		Sam Fender	Lewis Capaldi; Mahalia	
2020 (40th)		Celeste	Beabadoobee; Joy Crookes	
2021 (41st)		Griff	Pa Salieu; Rina Sawayama	
2022 (42nd)		Holly Humberstone	Bree Runway; Lola Young	
2023 (43rd)		FLO	Cat Burns; Nia Archives	
2024 (44th)		The Last Dinner Party	Caity Baser; Sekou	
2025 (45th)		Myles Smith	Elmiene; Good Neighbours	
2026 (46th)		Jacob Alon	Rose Gray; Sienna Spiro	
