= List of awards and nominations received by Calvin Harris =

Calvin Harris awards and nominations
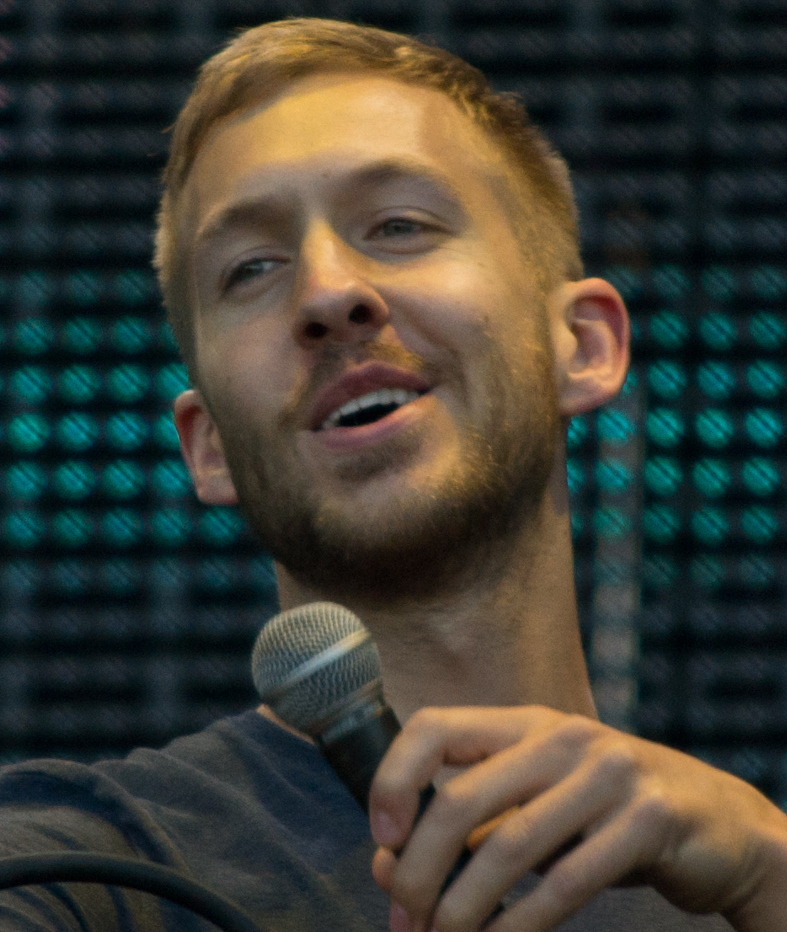
- Harris at Rock in Rio Madrid 2012
Awards and nominations
Award	Wins	Nominations
American Music Awards	2	6
Billboard Music Awards	1	15
Brit Awards	3	25
BreakTudo Awards	1	1
Grammy Awards	1	5
MTV Europe Music Awards	1	13
iHeartRadio Music Awards	2	8
MTV Video Music Awards	4	15

Totals (Note: Certain award groups do not simply award one winner. They acknowledge several different recipients, have runners-up, and have third place. Since this is a specific recognition and is different from losing an award, runner-up mentions are considered wins in this award tally. For simplification and to avoid errors, each award in this list has been presumed to have had a prior nomination.)
- Wins: 31
- Nominations: 118

This is a comprehensive listing of the awards and nominations received by Scottish DJ and recording artist Calvin Harris. He rose to prominence in Europe in 2007 following the release of his debut album I Created Disco and two of its singles; "Acceptable in the 80s" and "The Girls". His follow up album, 2009s Ready for the Weekend, became his first album to debut atop the UK Albums Charts, and spawned the UK Number 1 single "I'm Not Alone" and the top five UK single "Ready for the Weekend". In 2010, Ready for the Weekend was nominated for Dance-Pop Album of the Year at the Hungarian Music Awards.

He achieved international recognition in 2012, after achieving success in mostly European markets, with the release of his third album 18 Months which saw Harris step back from performing vocals in favour of collaborating with guest artists instead. The internationally successful single "We Found Love", which features vocals from Rihanna, was nominated for numerous awards, winning the Grammy Award for Best Music Video at the 55th Annual Grammy Awards in 2013. Harris has received six Grammy Awards nominations, winning one, with the most recent nomination in 2024, for the Grammy Award for Best Pop Dance Recording for his single "Miracle" which features vocals from Ellie Goulding.

Harris has been nominated for a total of 25 BRIT Awards, winning three as of 2026. His most recent win at the BRIT Awards was at the 2024 ceremony, winning the Brit Award for British Dance Act. He is a recipient of the Brit Award for British Producer of the Year and Brit Award for British Single of the Year in 2019.

Elsewhere, he has been nominated for fifteen Billboard Music Awards (winning the award for Top Dance/Electronic Artist in 2015), six American Music Awards nominations (winning the American Music Award for Favorite Electronic Dance Music Artist twice in 2014 and 2015 respectively), thirteen MTV Europe Music Awards nominations (winning the award for Best Electronic Act at the 2014 ceremony) and fifteen MTV Video Music Awards nominations (winning four – Video of the Year for "We Found Love" and Best Electronic Video for "Feel So Close" in 2012, and Best Male Video for "This Is What You Came For" and Best Electronic Video for "How Deep Is Your Love" in 2016).

In 2013 he received a Ivor Novello Award, and appeared on Debrett's 2017 list of the most influential people in the United Kingdom. He topped Forbes' list of the world's highest-paid DJs for six consecutive years from 2013 to 2018.

== American Music Awards ==
Year	Nominee / work	Award	Result	Ref.
2012	Calvin Harris	Favorite EDM Artist	Nominated	
2013	Calvin Harris	Favorite EDM Artist	Nominated	
2014	Calvin Harris	Favorite EDM Artist	Won	
2015	Calvin Harris	Favorite EDM Artist	Won	
2016	Calvin Harris	Favorite EDM Artist	Nominated	
2017	Calvin Harris	Favorite EDM Artist	Nominated	
2026	Calvin Harris	Best Dance/Electronic Artist	Nominated	

== APRA Music Awards ==
Year	Nominee / Work	Award	Result	Ref.
2020	"Promises" (w/ Sam Smith)	Most Performed International Work of the Year	Nominated	

== ASCAP Pop Music Awards ==
Year	Nominee / work	Award	Result
2013	"We Found Love" (with Rihanna)	Most Performed Songs	Won
2013	"Let's Go" (featuring Ne-Yo)	Most Performed Songs	Won
2013	"Where Have You Been"	Most Performed Songs	Won
2013	"Feel So Close"	Most Performed Songs	Won

== BBC Music Awards ==
Year	Nominee / work	Award	Result
2017	Funk Wav Bounces Vol. 1	British Album of the Year	Nominated

== Billboard Music Awards ==
Year	Nominee / work	Award	Result
2012	"We Found Love" (with Rihanna)	Top Radio Song	Nominated
2013	"Sweet Nothing" (featuring Florence Welch)	Top EDM Song	Nominated
2013	"Feel So Close"	Top EDM Song	Nominated
2013	Calvin Harris	Top Dance Artist	Nominated
2013	Calvin Harris	Top EDM Artist	Nominated
2014	Calvin Harris	Top Dance/Electronic Artist	Nominated
2015	Calvin Harris	Top Dance/Electronic Artist	Won
2015	"Summer"	Top Dance/Electronic Song	Nominated
2015	Motion	Top Dance/Electronic Album	Nominated
2017	Calvin Harris	Top Dance/Electronic Artist	Nominated
2017	"This Is What You Came For" (with Rihanna)	Top Dance/Electronic Song	Nominated
2018	Calvin Harris	Top Dance/Electronic Artist	Nominated
2018	Funk Wav Bounces Vol. 1	Top Dance/Electronic Album	Nominated
2019	Calvin Harris	Top Dance/Electronic Artist	Nominated
2019	"One Kiss" (with Dua Lipa)	Top Dance/Electronic Song	Nominated

== Billboard Latin Music Awards ==
Year	Nominee / work	Award	Result
2017	Calvin Harris	Crossover Artist of the Year	Nominated

== Brit Awards ==
Year	Nominee / work	Award	Result	Ref.
2009	"Dance wiv Me" (with Dizzee Rascal and Chrome)	British Single of the Year	Eliminated	
2010	Calvin Harris	British Male Solo Artist	Nominated	
2013	Calvin Harris	British Male Solo Artist	Nominated	
2014	"I Need Your Love" (featuring Ellie Goulding)	British Single of the Year	Nominated	
2014	"I Need Your Love" (featuring Ellie Goulding)	British Video of the Year	Nominated	
2015	"Summer"	British Single of the Year	Nominated	
2015	"Summer"	British Video of the Year	Nominated	
2016	Calvin Harris	British Male Solo Artist	Nominated	
2016	"How Deep Is Your Love" (with Disciples)	British Single of the Year	Nominated	
2016	"How Deep Is Your Love" (with Disciples)	British Video of the Year	Eliminated	
2017	"This Is What You Came For" (featuring Rihanna)	British Single of the Year	Nominated	
2017	"This Is What You Came For" (featuring Rihanna)	British Video of the Year	Eliminated	
2018	"Feels" (featuring Pharrell Williams, Katy Perry and Big Sean)	British Single of the Year	Nominated	
2018	"Feels" (featuring Pharrell Williams, Katy Perry and Big Sean)	British Video of the Year	Eliminated	
2019	Calvin Harris	Producer of the Year	Won	
2019	"One Kiss" (with Dua Lipa)	British Single of the Year	Won	
2019	"One Kiss" (with Dua Lipa)	British Video of the Year	Nominated	
2020	"Giant" (with Rag'n'Bone Man)	Song of the Year	Nominated	
2022	Calvin Harris	British Dance Act	Nominated	
2023	Calvin Harris	British Dance Act	Nominated	
2024	"Miracle" (with Ellie Goulding)	Song of the Year	Nominated	
2024	Calvin Harris	British Pop Act	Nominated	
2024	Calvin Harris	British Dance Act	Won	
2026	"Blessings" (with Clementine Douglas)	Song of the Year	Nominated	
2026	Calvin Harris & Clementine Douglas	British Dance Act	Nominated	

== Danish Music Awards ==
Year	Nominee / work	Award	Result
2012	"We Found Love" (featuring Rihanna)	International Hit of the Year	Nominated
2017	"Funk Wav Bounces Vol. 1"	International Album of the Year	Nominated

== DJ Magazine top 100 DJs ==
Year	Position	Notes	Ref.
2010	94	New Entry	
2011	34	Up 60	
2012	31	Up 3	
2013	15	Up 16	
2014	11	Up 4	
2015	11	No Change	
2016	14	Down 3	
2017	15	Down 1	
2018	40	Down 25	
2019	19	Up 21	
2020	18	Up 1	
2021	16	Up 2	
2022	16	No Change	
2023	12	Up 4	
2024	22	Down 10	
2025	16	Up 6	

== Electronic Dance Music Awards ==
The Electronic Dance Music Awards (also known as the EDMAwards) is an annual music award show focusing on electronic dance music. Harris has received sixteen nominations.

Year	Nominated work	Award	Result
2017	"How Deep Is Your Love" (with Disciples)	Best Extended Radio Edit	Nominated
2017	"This Is What You Came For" (Dillon Francis remix) [with Rihanna]	Best Use of Vocal	Nominated
2017	"This Is What You Came For" (R3hab & Henry Fong remix) [with Rihanna]	Best Banger	Nominated
2019	"Alone" (Calvin Harris remix) - Halsey (feat. Big Sean & Stefflon Don)	Remix of the Year – Production	Nominated
2019	Zedd & Maren Morris & GREY "The Middle" vs Calvin Harris "Feel So Close" (Dramos remix)	Best Mashup	Nominated
2019	"One Kiss" (with Dua Lipa)	Dance Song of the Year (Non Remix)	Nominated
2019	"One Kiss" (with Dua Lipa) [R3hab remix]	Best Banger	Nominated
2019	"One Kiss" (with Dua Lipa) [R3hab remix]	Best Rise/Drop	Nominated
2019	"One Kiss" (with Dua Lipa) (Jason Reilly & Alphalove remix)	Best Remix Collaboration	Nominated
2024	Himself	Male Artist Of The Year	Nominated
2024	"Miracle" (with Ellie Goulding)	Best Collaboration	Nominated
2024	"Miracle" (with Ellie Goulding)	Main Stage/Festival Song of the Year	Nominated
2024	"Miracle" (with Ellie Goulding)	Music Video Of The Year	Nominated
2024	"Body Moving" (with Eliza Rose)	Music Video Of The Year	Won
2024	"Miracle" (Mau P Remix) [with Ellie Goulding]	Remix Of The Year	Nominated
2025	"Free" (with Ellie Goulding)	Pop-Dance Anthem of the Year	Nominated

== Electronic Music Awards & Foundation Show ==
Year	Nominee / work	Award	Result
2016	"How Deep is Your Love" (featuring Disciples)	Single of the Year	Nominated
2016	Motion	Album of the Year	Nominated

== Fonogram Awards ==
Fonogram Awards is the national music awards of Hungary, held every year since 1992 and promoted by Mahasz.

Year	Nominee / work	Award	Result
2018	"Funk Wav Bounces Vol.1"	Foreign Electronic Music Album or Voice Recording	Nominated

== Grammy Awards ==
Year	Nominee / work	Award	Result	Ref.
2013	"We Found Love" (with Rihanna)	Best Music Video	Won	
2013	"Let's Go" (featuring Ne-Yo)	Best Dance Recording	Nominated	
2014	"Sweet Nothing" (featuring Florence Welch)	Best Dance Recording	Nominated	
2014	18 Months	Best Dance/Electronic Album	Nominated	
2018	Calvin Harris	Producer of the Year, Non-Classical	Nominated	
2024	"Miracle" (featuring Ellie Goulding)	Best Pop Dance Recording	Nominated	

== Global Awards ==
Year	Nominee / work	Award	Result
2019	"One Kiss" (with Dua Lipa)	Best Song	Nominated
2019	"Promises" (with Sam Smith)	Best Song	Nominated
2019	Calvin Harris	Best Male	Nominated
2019	Calvin Harris	Best British Artist or Group	Nominated

== Hungarian Music Awards ==
The Hungarian Music Awards is the national music awards of Hungary, held every year since 1992 and promoted by Mahasz.

Year	Nominee / work	Award	Result
2010	Ready for the Weekend	Dance-Pop Album of the Year	Nominated
2013	Calvin Harris	Foreign Electronic Music Production of the Year	Nominated
2014	"Under Control" (with Alesso and Hurts)	Foreign Electronic Music Album or Voice Recording	Nominated
2015	Motion	Foreign Electronic Music Album or Voice Recording	Won
2015	"My Way"	Foreign Electronic Music Album or Voice Recording	Nominated
2018	Funk Wav Bounces Vol. 1	Foreign Electronic Music Album or Voice Recording	Nominated

== iHeartRadio Music Awards ==
Year	Nominee / work	Award	Result
2014	"Sweet Nothing" (featuring Florence Welch)	EDM Song of the Year	Nominated
2015	"Blame" (featuring John Newman)	Dance Song of the Year	Nominated
2015	"Summer"	Dance Song of the Year	Won
2016	Calvin Harris	Dance Artist of the Year	Won
2017	Calvin Harris	Dance Artist of the Year	Nominated
2017	"This Is What You Came For" (featuring Rihanna)	Best Collaboration	Nominated
2017	"This Is What You Came For" (featuring Rihanna)	Best Music Video	Nominated
2018	Calvin Harris	Dance Artist of the Year	Nominated
2019	Calvin Harris	Dance Artist of the Year	Nominated
2019	"One Kiss" (featuring Dua Lipa)	Dance Song of the Year	Nominated
2019	"One Kiss" (featuring Dua Lipa)	Best Music Video	Nominated

== International Dance Music Awards ==
Year	Nominee / work	Award	Result
2012	"We Found Love" (with Rihanna)	Best R&B/Urban Dance Track	Won
2012	"We Found Love" (with Rihanna)	Best Commercial/Pop Dance Track	Won
2013	"Sweet Nothing" (featuring Florence Welch)	Best Progressive Track	Nominated
2013	"Sweet Nothing" (featuring Florence Welch)	Best Music Video	Nominated
2013	"Sweet Nothing" (featuring Florence Welch)	Best Commercial/Pop Dance Track	Won
2013	Calvin Harris	Best Remixer	Nominated
2013	Calvin Harris	Best Artist (Solo)	Nominated
2020	Calvin Harris	Best Dance / Electronic (Male)	Nominated
2026	"I'm Not Alone (MPH Remix)"	Best Remix	Nominated

== Ivor Novello Awards ==
Year	Nominee / work	Award	Result
2009	"Dance wiv Me" (with Dizzee Rascal and Chrome)	Best Contemporary Song	Nominated
2013	Calvin Harris	Songwriter of the Year	Won
2020	"Giant" (with Rag'n'Bone Man)	PRS for Music Most Performed Work	Won
2026	Calvin Harris	PRS for Music Icon Award	Won

== Latin American Music Awards ==
Year	Recipient	Award	Result
2016	"This Is What You Came For" (w/ Rihanna)	Favorite Dance Song	Won

== Los Premios 40 Principales ==
=== Los Premios 40 Principales América ===
Year	Nominee / work	Award	Result
2012	Calvin Harris	Best International New Act	Nominated
2012	Calvin Harris	Best International Dance Act	Nominated
2014	Calvin Harris	Best English Language Act	Nominated
2014	"Summer"	Best English Language Song	Won

=== LOS40 Music Awards ===
Year	Nominee / work	Award	Result
2017	"Funk Wav Bounces Vol. 1"	International Album of the Year	Nominated
2018	"One Kiss"	International Song of the Year	Nominated

== MTV Awards ==
=== MTV Europe Music Awards ===
Year	Nominee / work	Award	Result
2012	Best Song	"We Found Love" (with Rihanna)	Nominated
2012	Best Video	"We Found Love" (with Rihanna)	Nominated
2012	Best Electronic Act	Calvin Harris	Nominated
2013	Best Electronic Act	Calvin Harris	Nominated
2013	Best UK & Ireland Act	Calvin Harris	Nominated
2014	Best Electronic Act	Calvin Harris	Won
2014	Best UK & Ireland Act	Calvin Harris	Nominated
2015	Best Electronic Act	Calvin Harris	Nominated
2015	Best UK & Ireland Act	Calvin Harris	Nominated
2016	Best Male Act	Calvin Harris	Nominated
2016	Best Electronic Act	Calvin Harris	Nominated
2017	Best Electronic Act	Calvin Harris	Nominated
2018	Best Electronic Act	Calvin Harris	Nominated
2019	Best Electronic Act	Calvin Harris	Nominated

=== MTV Video Music Awards ===
Year	Nominee / work	Award	Result
2012	Video of the Year	"We Found Love" (with Rihanna)	Won
2012	Best Female Video	"We Found Love" (with Rihanna)	Nominated
2012	Best Pop	"We Found Love" (with Rihanna)	Nominated
2012	Best Electronic Video	"Feel So Close"	Won
2013	Best Collaboration	"I Need Your Love" (featuring Ellie Goulding)	Nominated
2013	Best Song of the Summer	"I Need Your Love" (featuring Ellie Goulding)	Nominated
2013	Best Editing	"Sweet Nothing"	Nominated
2014	Best Dance Video	"Summer"	Nominated
2016	Best Male Video	"This Is What You Came For" (featuring Rihanna)	Won
2016	Best Collaboration	"This Is What You Came For" (featuring Rihanna)	Nominated
2016	Best Electronic Video	"How Deep Is Your Love" (with Disciples)	Won
2017	Best Collaboration	"Feels" (with Katy Perry, Pharrell Williams & Big Sean)	Nominated
2017	Best Dance Video	"My Way"	Nominated
2018	Best Dance	"One Kiss" (with Dua Lipa)	Nominated
2018	Song of Summer	"One Kiss" (with Dua Lipa)	Nominated

=== MTV Video Music Awards Japan ===
Year	Nominee / work	Award	Result
2012	"We Found Love" (with Rihanna)	Best Pop	Nominated
2013	"Sweet Nothing" (featuring Florence Welch)	Best Collaboration	Nominated

== MuchMusic Video Awards ==
Year	Nominee / work	Award	Result
2012	"We Found Love" (with Rihanna)	International Video of the Year – Artist	Nominated
2018	Calvin Harris	Best EDM/Dance Artist or Group	Nominated

== NME Awards ==
Year	Nominee / work	Award	Result
2009	"Dance wiv Me" (with Dizzee Rascal and Chrome)	Best Dancefloor Filler	Won
2013	"Sweet Nothing" (featuring Florence Welch)	Dancefloor Anthem	Won

== NRJ Music Award ==
Year	Nominee / work	Award	Result
2009	"We Found Love"	Best Song International	Nominated
2016	Calvin Harris	Best Live Performance	Nominated
2016	Calvin Harris	Best International DJ	Nominated
2018	Calvin Harris	DJ of the Year	Nominated
2018	"One Kiss"	International Duo/Group of the year	Nominated
2018	"One Kiss"	International Song of the Year	Nominated

== WDM Radio Awards ==
Year	Nominee / work	Award	Result
2017	Calvin Harris	King of Social Media	Nominated
2017	"This Is What You Came For" (featuring Rihanna)	Best Global Track	Won
2018	Calvin Harris	King of Social Media	Nominated

== YouTube Creator Awards ==
- Calvin Harris
  (18.5 million subscribers - July 2022)

== Other awards ==
Year	Award	Category	Nominated work	Result	Ref.
2007	BT Digital Music Awards	Best Electronic Artist or DJ	Calvin Harris	Nominated	
2007	Q Awards	Best Breakthrough Artist	Calvin Harris	Nominated	
2009	The Music Producers Guild Awards	Best Remixer	Calvin Harris	Won	
2009	Urban Music Awards	Best Dance Act	Calvin Harris	Won	
2009	Popjustice £20 Music Prize	Best Contemporary Song	"I'm Not Alone"	Nominated	
2012	mtvU Woodie Awards	EDM Effect Woodie	Calvin Harris	Won	
2013	Scottish Album of the Year	Album of the Year	18 Months	Nominated	
2014	BMI London Awards	Song of the Year	"I Need Your Love" (featuring Ellie Goulding)	Nominated	
2015	ARIA Music Awards	Best International Artist	Motion	Nominated	
