= ShockOne =

Australian electronic music producer and DJ

- Born: Karl Thomas; 29 November 1982 (age 43); Esperance, Western Australia, Australia
- Origin: Perth, Western Australia, Australia
- Genres: Drum and bass, dubstep, drumstep, electro house
- Occupations: Musician, producer, commentator
- Instrument: Computer
- Years active: 2005–present
- Labels: Viper Recordings, Monstercat, Warner Music Australia
- Members: Karl Thomas
- Past members: Jay Burns
- Website: http://shockone.com.au/

Karl Thomas (born 29 November 1982), better known as ShockOne, is an Australian electronic music producer and DJ born in 1982. Originally from Esperance, Western Australia, he now resides in Perth. He has been releasing music as ShockOne since 2005, producing a wide variety of dance genres including drum and bass, dubstep, drumstep and electro house.

== History ==
=== Beginnings ===
Karl Thomas was a drummer and in high school when he met and formed a metal band (called Xygen) with Rob Swire and Gareth McGrillen (the two who would later become Pendulum and eventually Knife Party) and Jay Burns. When Pendulum started in the early 2000s, Xygen finished, and so Thomas started making electronic music of his own, under the alias of ShockOne.

=== Early career (2005–2008) ===
From 2005 to 2009, ShockOne released many singles and remixes, making a name for himself within the worldwide drum and bass scene.

=== ShockOne EP (2009–2010) ===
In 2009, he released a debut self-titled EP, containing drum and bass hit "Polygon" and dubstep track "Adachigahara's Theme" among others. The Re-Fix EP was released in 2010 containing VIPs and remixes of songs off the ShockOne EP.

=== Universus (2011–2014) ===
In 2010, Thomas announced plans to work on his full-length debut album, Universus. the first single from the album, "Crucify Me," was released in June 2011. this two-part drum and bass/dubstep track featured his own vocals and a collaboration with fellow producer and friend, Phetsta. the second single, "Relapse, " a dubstep track with vocals by Sam Nafie, came out in December 2011. The third single, "Chaos Theory, " a drumstep/dubstep piece, got much attention in Australia, the Uk, and around the world in October 2012. The fourth single, "Lazerbeam, " a drum and bass track with additional production by Metrik and vocals by kyza, was another highlight of Universus.

A highly anticipated album, Universus was released on 26 April 2013 in Australia and on 29 April in the rest of the world. The album became overall number one album in Australia on its first day of release. It contains 14 songs in dance genres such as drum and bass, electro house, and dubstep. Collaborations include Phetsta, Reija Lee (ShockOne's sister), Metrik, Kyza, and Sam Nafie. Thomas said of the title: "The loose theme of Universus is the lifespan of our universe. The term itself, 'universus', actually means everything right now. It's dealing with, as humans, our perception of reality and how we deal with the universe that we're in."

=== In This Light and A Dark Machine (2014–present) ===
After moving to London for a number of years, Thomas moved back to Perth in 2014 to build a new studio at home before he started work on his EP, In This Light, which was released on 6 May 2016. To build hype for the EP and to re-introduce himself to the market, Thomas premiered the single "City Lock" off the EP on triple j Goodnights on 2 February 2016, and announced a national tour.

All the while, Thomas continues to produce remixes for many artists including Netsky, Chicane, Ayah Marar, The Aston Shuffle, and Brookes Brothers.

ShockOne released his second full-length album A Dark Machine on 1 August 2019. He embarked on a nationwide tour promoting the album the same month.

== Discography ==
Sources for discography are correct as of Discogs and iTunes.

=== Studio albums ===
Title	Album details	Peak positions
Title	Album details	AUS
Universus	Released: 29 April 2013; Label: Viper Recordings	2
A Dark Machine	Released: 21 August 2019; Label: Warner Music Australia, Monstercat	— (Note: A Dark Machine did not enter the ARIA Albums Chart, but peaked at number 26 on the ARIA Digital Album Chart.)
Organism Algorithm	Released: 23 February 2024; Label: Dark Machine Records	?

=== Extended plays ===
Title	EP details
Headroom Part 2 (with L Plus)	Released: 7 April 2008; Label: Viper Recordings
ShockOne	Released: 10 April 2009; Label: Viper Recordings
The Re-Fix	Released: 1 October 2010; Label: Viper Recordings
In This Light	Released: 6 May 2016; Label: Warner Music Australia

=== Singles ===
Title	Year	Album
"Dropping Science" / "Silverscreen"	2005	Non-album singles
"Let Me Go" / "Frank"	2006	Non-album singles
"It's On!"	2006	Non-album singles
"Don't You Know" / "Shock Resistance" (featuring Elisha King)	2007	Non-album singles
"The Riddler" / "We Be Droppin This"	2007	Non-album singles
"The Calling" / "Follow You"	2008	Non-album singles
"The Sun" / "Cyclones" (with Phetsta)	2008	Non-album singles
"The Sun 2009" / "Stage Diver" (with Phetsta)	2009	Non-album singles
"Crucify Me" (featuring Phetsta)	2011	Universus
"Relapse" (featuring Sam Nafie)	2011	Universus
"Chaos Theory"	2012	Universus
"Lazerbeam" (featuring Metrik & Kyza)	2013	Universus
"Showdown" (with Virtual Riot)	2016	Non-album single
"A Dark Machine" (featuring Reija Lee)	2017	A Dark Machine
"Bleed Black" (featuring Cruz Patterson)	2018	A Dark Machine
"Underloved" (featuring Cecil)	2018	A Dark Machine
"Run" (featuring The Bloody Beetroots)	2019	A Dark Machine
"Til Dawn"	2019	A Dark Machine
"It's All Over"	2020	Non-album single
"Follow Me"	2020	Non-album single
"Hardwired" (featuring Reija Lee)	2021	Non-album single
"Thinkin About" (with Lee Mvtthews)	2022	Non-album single
"Collecting Thoughts" (with Koven)	2022	TBA
"Say Woah"	2022	Non-album single
"Heart on Fire" (with Paulene Herr)	2023	Non-album single
"Rewire" (with PENELOPE)	2025	Non-album single

== Awards and nominations ==
=== AIR Awards ===
The Australian Independent Record Awards (known colloquially as the AIR Awards) is an annual awards night to recognise, promote and celebrate the success of Australia's Independent Music sector.

Year	Nominee / work	Award	Result	Ref.
2021	"Follow Me"	Best Independent Dance, Electronica or Club Single	Won	

=== National Live Music Awards ===
The National Live Music Awards (NLMAs) are a broad recognition of Australia's diverse live industry, celebrating the success of the Australian live scene. The awards commenced in 2016.

Year	Nominee / work	Award	Result	Ref.
2018	ShockOne	Live Electronic Act (or DJ) of the Year	Nominated	
