= Lee Matthews =

Lee Matthews may refer to:

- Lee Matthews (footballer) (born 1979), English football player
- Lee Matthews (singer) (born 1988), Irish singer, songwriter
- Lee Mvtthews, New Zealand drum & bass duo
