= Sweet Nothing (Calvin Harris song) =

2012 single by Calvin Harris

Single by Calvin Harris featuring Florence Welch

from the album 18 Months
- Released: 12 October 2012
- Recorded: 2012
- Genre: EDM
- Length: 3:32
- Label: Deconstruction; Fly Eye; Columbia
- Songwriters: Calvin Harris; Florence Welch; Thomas Hull
- Producer: Calvin Harris

Calvin Harris singles chronology
"We'll Be Coming Back" (2012)	"Sweet Nothing" (2012)	"Drinking from the Bottle" (2013)

Florence Welch singles chronology
"Sweet Nothing" (2012)	"Wild Season" (2017)

Music video
- "Sweet Nothing" on YouTube

"Sweet Nothing" is a song by Scottish DJ and record producer Calvin Harris from his third studio album, 18 Months (2012). It features vocals from Florence and the Machine singer Florence Welch. Harris previously worked with the band in a remix of their single, "Spectrum" (2012). While recording 18 Months, Harris expressed interest in working with Welch. He mentioned that it was not easy and he had to chase her, due to schedule conflicts. Welch accepted his invitation and the two recorded "Sweet Nothing". The track premiered on The Chris Moyles Show on BBC Radio 1 on 28 August 2012 and was later released as the fifth single from the album on 12 October 2012.

"Sweet Nothing" is an electronic dance music song, with heartfelt vocals and an escalating beat. Lyrically, it talks about a romance with no depth, where the protagonist is receiving "sweet nothing". "Sweet Nothing" received favourable reviews, with many critics praising its production and Welch's vocals. The song debuted at number one on the UK Singles Chart, marking Harris' first number-one single as a main artist in the United Kingdom since his 2009 single, "I'm Not Alone". The song is also Welch's first top-ten hit in the United States, peaking at number 10. "Sweet Nothing" was nominated for Best Dance Recording at the 56th Grammy Awards.

The music video for the song, directed by Vincent Haycock, premiered on 20 September 2012. In the video, Welch works as a singer at a bar or club, pouring the pain and frustration of her unfulfilled life and abusive relationship into every revealing and explosive performance. However, after recognising the benefits of her seedy environment, she plots to rid herself of her boyfriend.

== Background and development ==
"It's more satisfying when you're pursuing something. It's like chasing a girl or something. It's way more satisfying if you put in a year's worth of effort of chasing and then you get the result, you get the vocal."

— Harris on working with Welch.

On 30 July 2012, Calvin Harris stated via his Twitter account that his third studio album 18 Months would be released at the end of October 2012. In an interview with 4Music, Harris explained that the album would be "like a compilation, a NOW album with me all over it." While recording for the album, 18 Months, Calvin wanted to collaborate with Florence Welch. He had previously worked with her band Florence and the Machine on a remix of their 2012 single 'Spectrum' (2012). It eventually peaked at number-one on the UK Singles Chart. He told MTV that the thrill of the chase only made her vocal contribution that much more special. Harris' history with Florence started far before the year and a half he dedicated to making the album. He further explained:

"I met Florence for the first time end of 2007 and the first time I ever saw her in my life, it was like weird corporate [party] and I walked into the green room and she was definitely drunk, getting a piggy back off someone in her band, like with a bottle of champagne, screaming. And I thought 'I like this girl.'... And in the years [since] she just actually grew up. I wasn't expecting that," he said. "I thought she was a cool kid, one of those people who come and go and then she just smashed it." He added, "Now Florence is Florence. She's cool as fuck as well."

To record the track, Harris had to go after Florence to record her vocals for the track. He also stated, "With Florence, she was really busy at that time. She was in the middle of a tour and she had like three days to record something, so I wasn't there, anything could've come back." Calvin was pressed for time when he got the call and finding out Florence would do the vocals on "Sweet Nothing." He hadn't started working on the song and scrambled to give her a track to record the vocals on. He told Rolling Stone that, "I didn't think she'd do it. She seemed a really unattainable artist to reach for. I think she would've done it if the song was right and the people were right and it was all at the right time. I did a remix for her and she owed me a favor – I guess part of it was that." "Sweet Nothing" first premiered on The Chris Moyles Show on BBC Radio 1 on 28 August 2012, and was released as the fifth single from the album on 14 October 2012. Furthermore, it was released to US mainstream radio on 6 November.

== Composition ==
"Sweet Nothing"
A 22-second sample of "Sweet Nothing".

"Sweet Nothing" was written by Calvin Harris, Florence Welch and Kid Harpoon, while production was handled by Harris. He also serves as the arranger and plays all instruments of the track. The song was recorded by Harpoon and mastered by Simon Dave. Welch, from the band Florence and the Machine, is the vocalist of the track. It is an electronic dance music song, following the familiar pattern of taking love-strung vocals and layering them over a bouncy, ever-building beat. The tale of "Sweet Nothing" is a romance with no depth. It addresses a relationship: "You took my heart and you held it in your mouth/ And with a word all my love came rushing out/ And every whisper, it's the worst, emptied out by a single word," Welch begins the track.

== Critical reception ==
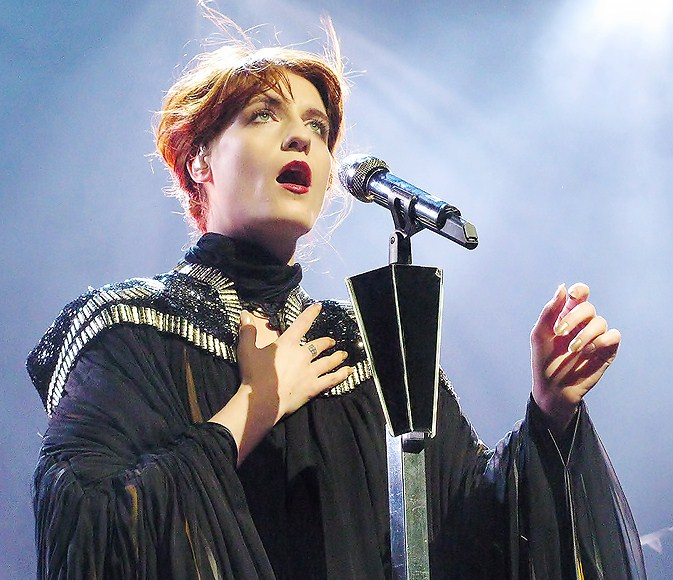
"Sweet Nothing" features Florence Welch (pictured), who received favourable reviews from music critics, for delivering "tamed", but "special" vocals.

"Sweet Nothing" received acclaim from music critics. After its premiere on the radio, Robbie Daw of Idolator stated, "If there was any doubt as to whether Harris is the current king of frothy, radio-friendly dance pop on both sides of the Atlantic, one need only listen to this energetic jam." Chris Smith of Yahoo! UK called it "a pop pairing made in heaven", writing, "The club friendly track features Calvin's latest knob twiddling genius that never seems to get old despite debuting in last year's monster anthem 'We Found Love'. Flo's vocal again lends itself effortlessly to the track—it's somehow difficult to understand why she hadn't ventured into this territory before. 'Sweet Nothing' manages to sound anthemic without needing the big drop." Billboard was very positive, writing, "The bass glimmers underneath Welch's operatic chants, as the singer, freed momentarily from her well-oiled Machine, gets to re-imagine her career as a dance goddess. It delivers its irresistible throb via a special voice." Rebecca Nicholson of The Guardian called it "the highlight of 18 Months."

Emily Mackay of NME agreed, stating that "the highest point apart is Florence's dance-diva turn on the p-p-p-p-powing power-house of 'Sweet Nothing'." Adam Pollock of Filter magazine opined, "A thrilling guest vocal by Florence Welch adds an excitingly dark vibe to the album, which for the most part stays in booty-shaking mode." Bill Lamb of About.com rated the song three-and-a-half out of five stars, calling it "satisfying as a pop radio treat, but it leaves fans hoping for something just a little deeper and more memorable." He criticised the song for "failing to go much further beyond the arresting opening," however he wrote that "Calvin Harris' disco-inflected pop remains irresistible." Tim Sendra of AllMusic was mixed, writing that "Florence Welch's desperate wail pushes it over the top." Melissa Maerz of Entertainment Weekly agreed, writing that "Welch's banshee wail gets buried under the laser-gun peals of 'Sweet Nothing'." Robert Copsey of Digital Spy felt that the song "lacked originality and felt more like attempt to fit in rather than stand out."

== Commercial performance ==
=== United Kingdom and Ireland ===
In the UK midweeks charts, "Sweet Nothing" was ahead of Swedish House Mafia, knocking their track "Don't You Worry Child" into second place. On 21 October 2012, the single topped the UK Singles Chart, becoming their second number one single in three months, following Harris's remix of Florence and the Machine's "Spectrum (Say My Name)" in topping the UK chart. It is also Harris' fourth number one single in the UK either as a solo or featured artist. On 27 October 2012, the song dropped to number 3. In its third week, it fell to number 6. It also topped the chart in Ireland where it became his third number one singles on that country after "We Found Love" and "We'll Be Coming Back".

=== Oceania ===
The song was a commercial success in Australia, debuting at number 2 on the ARIA Charts week of 28 October 2012. In its second week, it remained at number 2, while in its third week, it fell only to number 2. It remained to further weeks at the top-ten, before falling on the charts. In its twelfth week, the song gave a climb from number 36 to number 25. "Sweet Nothing" was certified 2× Platinum by the Australian Recording Industry Association (ARIA), denoting shipments of 140,000 copies. In New Zealand, the song repeated the same success, debuting at number 2 on the RIANZ chart week of 22 October 2012. It fell to number 4, in its second week, but climbed to number 3, in its third week. It spent 4 further weeks inside the top-ten. After two weeks out of the top-twenty, "Sweet Nothing" climbed to number 19, in its twelfth week, being certified "Platinum" by the Recording Industry Association of New Zealand.

=== United States ===
"Sweet Nothing" debuted at number 96 on the US Billboard Hot 100 chart, on the week of 3 November 2012. After three weeks out of the charts, the song re-entered at number 97, on the week of 1 December 2012. In its third week, it jumped to number 82, while in its fourth week, it climbed to number 58. That same week, it debuted on the Pop Songs chart at number 32. In its sixth week, the single entered the top-forty, climbing to number 33. After a fall to number 40, the song jumped to number 24, also peaking at number 20 on the Pop Songs chart. In its tenth week, the song reached number 20 on the Hot 100, becoming Harris' third top-twenty single. In its twelfth week, the song peaked at number 10, becoming his first top 10 hit as lead performer in the country (second overall) and also Florence Welch's first US top 10 hit. As of July 2013, the song has sold over 1,216,000 copies in the United States.

== Music video ==
On 23 August, Harris announced via Facebook that he was filming the music video for "Sweet Nothing" with Florence and the Machine. The video was filmed over two days at a working men's club in Dalston, London, under the direction of Vincent Haycock who also directed Harris' videos for "Flashback", "Bounce" and "Feel So Close". The exterior shots were filmed close to Stepney Methodist Church Bus Stop on Commercial Road, Limehouse, London. The music video premiered on 20 September 2012 through Harris' YouTube VEVO channel. The video stars Harris and Welch, as well as English actors Leo Gregory and Kianoush Joseph.

The video begins with Gregory sitting in a restaurant after breaking up with Welch. As he leaves the restaurant, he passes his food to a hooded man, who becomes confused as to why Gregory gave it to him. Meanwhile, Florence Welch is seen in a suit onstage at a nightclub where she is performing. Gregory gets stopped on his way by a group of men who start assaulting him. He tries to fight back, resulting in an even more severe beating. While he gets beaten, Welch seems to "feel" pain as she sings on the stage. This segment is interspersed with scenes of Gregory fighting with his girlfriend and his girlfriend telling her story to Calvin Harris. Harris watches as Welch takes off her suit and tie and frees her hair to reveal herself as the girlfriend being abused by Gregory. This is when we are shown how Calvin Harris, who, after listening to Florence Welch's story of her and Gregory's violent relationship and break-up, executes her revenge by arranging to have Gregory beaten up. Welch continues her angry and energetic dancing as the video ends, along with the flashbacks, with Gregory still being assaulted by the men, and Gregory's girlfriend still distraught in the bathroom. Due to the violent and sexual content and nudity scenes, the music video was broadcast on some music channels with a warning Not advised to kids under 10 years old in France in 2012.

== Track listing ==
Digital EP
No.	Title	Length
1.	"Sweet Nothing"	3:35
2.	"Sweet Nothing" (Tiësto remix)	5:08
3.	"Sweet Nothing" (Burns remix)	4:00
4.	"Sweet Nothing" (Dirtyloud remix)	4:02
5.	"Sweet Nothing" (Qulinez remix)	6:14

German CD single
No.	Title	Length
1.	"Sweet Nothing"	3:35
2.	"Sweet Nothing" (Tiësto remix)	5:08

== Charts ==
=== Weekly charts ===
Chart (2012–2013)	Peak position
Australia (ARIA)	2
Australia Dance (ARIA)	1
Austria (Ö3 Austria Top 40)	29
Belgium (Ultratop 50 Flanders)	9
Belgium (Ultratop 50 Wallonia)	23
Canada Hot 100 (Billboard)	15
CIS Airplay (TopHit)	55
Czech Republic Airplay (ČNS IFPI)	26
Denmark (Tracklisten)	8
Euro Digital Song Sales (Billboard)	4
Finland (Suomen virallinen lista)	9
France (SNEP)	17
Germany (GfK)	19
Hungary (Rádiós Top 40)	12
Hungary (Dance Top 40)	31
Ireland (IRMA)	1
Italy (Musica e Dischi)	34
Japan Hot 100 (Billboard)	36
Luxembourg Digital Song Sales (Billboard)	10
Mexico (Billboard Mexican Airplay)	1
Netherlands (Dutch Top 40)	22
Netherlands (Single Top 100)	29
New Zealand (Recorded Music NZ)	2
Norway (VG-lista)	13
Poland Airplay (ZPAV)	4
Portugal Digital Song Sales (Billboard)	7
Romania (Romanian Top 100)	72
Russia Airplay (TopHit)	68
Scottish Singles Sales (Official Charts)	1
Slovakia Airplay (ČNS IFPI)	30
Spain (Promusicae)	33
Sweden (Sverigetopplistan)	15
Switzerland (Schweizer Hitparade)	36
Ukraine Airplay (TopHit)	15
UK Singles (Official Charts)	1
UK Dance (Official Charts)	1
US Billboard Hot 100	10
US Adult Pop Airplay (Billboard)	20
US Dance Club Songs (Billboard)	1
US Hot Dance/Electronic Songs (Billboard)	3
US Latin Pop Airplay (Billboard)	17
US Pop Airplay (Billboard)	5
US Rhythmic Airplay (Billboard)	13

=== Year-end charts ===
Chart (2012)	Position
Australia (ARIA)	55
Australia Dance (ARIA)	9
Netherlands (Dutch Top 40)	101
UK Singles (Official Charts)	48

Chart (2013)	Position
Australia Dance (ARIA)	38
Belgium (Ultratop 50 Flanders)	97
Belgium (Ultratop 50 Wallonia)	71
Brazil (Crowley)	90
Canada Hot 100 (Billboard)	48
France (SNEP)	85
Netherlands (Dutch Top 40)	192
Sweden (Sverigetopplistan)	51
US Billboard Hot 100	44
US Hot Dance/Electronic Songs (Billboard)	12
US Pop Airplay (Billboard)	24

== Certifications ==
Region	Certification	Certified units/sales
Australia (ARIA)	6× Platinum	420,000^{‡}
Belgium (BRMA)	Gold	15,000^{*}
Brazil (Pro-Música Brasil)	Diamond	250,000^{‡}
Canada (Music Canada)	5× Platinum	400,000^{‡}
Germany (BVMI)	Platinum	300,000^{‡}
Italy (FIMI)	Gold	15,000^{*}
Mexico (AMPROFON)	Gold	30,000^{*}
New Zealand (RMNZ)	3× Platinum	90,000^{‡}
Spain (Promusicae)	Gold	30,000^{‡}
Sweden (GLF)	2× Platinum	80,000^{‡}
Switzerland (IFPI Switzerland)	Gold	15,000^{^}
United Kingdom (BPI)	2× Platinum	1,200,000^{‡}
United States (RIAA)	3× Platinum	3,000,000^{‡}
Streaming
Denmark (IFPI Danmark)	2× Platinum	3,600,000^{†}
^{*} Sales figures based on certification alone.^{^} Shipments figures based on certification alone.^{‡} Sales+streaming figures based on certification alone.^{†} Streaming-only figures based on certification alone.

== Release history ==
Region	Date	Format
Australia	12 October 2012	Digital download
Brazil	12 October 2012	Digital download
Denmark	12 October 2012	Digital download
France	12 October 2012	Digital download
Germany	12 October 2012	Digital download
Ireland	12 October 2012	Digital download
Italy	12 October 2012	Digital download
New Zealand	12 October 2012	Digital download
Norway	12 October 2012	Digital download
Portugal	12 October 2012	Digital download
Spain	12 October 2012	Digital download
United Kingdom	14 October 2012	Digital download
United States	6 November 2012	Mainstream airplay
Germany	16 November 2012	CD single
United States	11 December 2012	Digital download
