= We'll Be Coming Back =

2012 single by Calvin Harris

Single by Calvin Harris featuring Example

from the album 18 Months
- Released: 27 July 2012
- Recorded: 2012
- Studio: Fly Eye, London
- Genre: Electro house
- Length: 3:56
- Label: Deconstruction; Fly Eye; Columbia
- Songwriters: Calvin Harris; Elliot Gleave
- Producer: Calvin Harris

Calvin Harris singles chronology
"Let's Go" (2012)	"We'll Be Coming Back" (2012)	"Sweet Nothing" (2012)

Example singles chronology
"Daydreamer" (2012)	"We'll Be Coming Back" (2012)	"Say Nothing" (2012)

Music video
- "We'll Be Coming Back" on YouTube

"We'll Be Coming Back" is a song by Scottish DJ and record producer Calvin Harris featuring English singer and songwriter Example. The song was released on 27 July 2012 as the fourth single from Harris' third studio album, 18 Months (2012). The song spent two weeks at number two (held off by Wiley's "Heatwave" for both its weeks at number one) on the UK Singles Chart, becoming Harris' fourth consecutive number-two single in the United Kingdom. In Ireland, the song debuted at number one, becoming Example's first number-one single and Harris' second (first as a lead artist) in the country. It also featured as the final track on Example's fourth studio album, The Evolution of Man (2012).

== Background and composition ==
Beginning with a melodic guitar-driven introduction, "We'll Be Coming Back" transitions into a "hard electro synth-fuelled chorus" featuring Example's vocals. The repeated hook "We didn't wanna call it too early / Now it seems a world away, but I miss that day / Are we ever gonna feel the same?" contains similar notes as the chorus of Aerosmith's "I Don't Want to Miss a Thing".

The song premiered on Zane Lowe's BBC Radio 1 show on 31 May 2012. Harris later said the track would come out "in a month or so".

== Music video ==
Directed by Saman Kesh and filmed in the Hollywood Hills overlooking Los Angeles, California in June 2012, the music video for "We'll Be Coming Back" stars Harris and Example as robbers. After burying what they've stolen, the two return at a later time to retrieve the goods to find that a female police officer, riding a 2009 Yamaha YZF-R1, who had been tracking them has got there first, leaving behind her badge as evidence. In addition to the robbery, the video features a series of high-speed car chases and police confrontations. The video ends with Calvin and Example pursuing the officer on the bike.

Speaking to Capital in June 2012, Harris stated that they both wanted to "look cool" in the music video for "We'll Be Coming Back," and went on to say of the video premise: "we've got flash cars and it's the old two day trip to LA option." With Example driving a 1973 Porsche 911 T and Harris driving a Ferrari 512 BB, several expensive cars were damaged during the filming of the video. The video for "We'll Be Coming Back" premiered on 6 July 2012.

== Critical reception ==
The song has been called the "soundtrack to the summer" by Music News, and a "summer anthem" by the Westmeath Examiner. Digital Spy gave the track a mixed review, describing it as "mildly enjoyable" but "a little stale."

== Track listing ==
Digital download
No.	Title	Length
1.	"We'll Be Coming Back"	3:56
2.	"We'll Be Coming Back" (Original Extended Mix)	6:33
3.	"We'll Be Coming Back" (Michael Woods Remix)	5:18
4.	"We'll Be Coming Back" (KillSonik Remix)	5:32
5.	"We'll Be Coming Back" (R3hab EDC NYC Remix)	6:09
6.	"We'll Be Coming Back" (R3hab EDC Vegas Remix)	5:57
7.	"We'll Be Coming Back" (Jacob Plant Remix)	5:03

CD single
No.	Title	Length
1.	"We'll Be Coming Back"	3:56
2.	"We'll Be Coming Back" (Original Extended Mix)	6:33
3.	"We'll Be Coming Back" (Michael Woods Remix)	5:18
4.	"We'll Be Coming Back" (KillSonik Remix)	5:32

12-inch single
No.	Title	Length
1.	"We'll Be Coming Back" (Original Extended Mix)	6:33
2.	"We'll Be Coming Back" (Michael Woods Remix)	5:18
3.	"We'll Be Coming Back" (Jacob Plant Remix)	5:03
4.	"We'll Be Coming Back" (KillSonik Remix)	5:32

== Charts ==
=== Weekly charts ===
Chart (2012)	Peak position
Australia (ARIA)	8
Belgium (Ultratip Bubbling Under Flanders)	4
Belgium (Ultratop Flanders Dance)	13
Belgium (Ultratip Bubbling Under Wallonia)	1
Belgium (Ultratop Wallonia Dance)	19
CIS Airplay (TopHit)	8
Czech Republic Airplay (ČNS IFPI)	24
Denmark (Tracklisten)	5
Finland (Suomen virallinen lista)	10
Hungary (Dance Top 40)	6
Hungary (Rádiós Top 40)	1
Ireland (IRMA)	1
Netherlands (Dutch Top 40)	30
Netherlands (Single Top 100)	28
New Zealand (Recorded Music NZ)	16
Poland (Polish Airplay New)	4
Russia Airplay (TopHit)	10
Scotland Singles (Official Charts)	1
Slovakia Airplay (ČNS IFPI)	47
Sweden (Sverigetopplistan)	5
UK Singles (Official Charts)	2
UK Dance (Official Charts)	2
Ukraine Airplay (TopHit)	34
US Dance Club Songs (Billboard)	24

=== Year-end charts ===
Chart (2012)	Position
Australia (ARIA)	71
Hungary (Dance Top 40)	34
Hungary (Rádiós Top 40)	13
Russia Airplay (TopHit)	47
Sweden (Sverigetopplistan)	33
UK Singles (Official Charts Company)	63

Chart (2013)	Position
Australia Streaming (ARIA)	97
Hungary (Dance Top 40)	40
Hungary (Rádiós Top 40)	76
Russia Airplay (TopHit)	129
Sweden (Sverigetopplistan)	84

== Certifications ==
Certifications for "We'll Be Coming Back"
Region	Certification	Certified units/sales
Australia (ARIA)	3× Platinum	210,000^{‡}
Brazil (Pro-Música Brasil)	2× Platinum	120,000^{‡}
Canada (Music Canada)	Gold	40,000^{‡}
New Zealand (RMNZ)	Platinum	15,000^{*}
Sweden (GLF)	3× Platinum	120,000^{‡}
United Kingdom (BPI)	Platinum	600,000^{‡}
Streaming
Denmark (IFPI Danmark)	2× Platinum	3,600,000^{†}
^{*} Sales figures based on certification alone.^{‡} Sales+streaming figures based on certification alone.^{†} Streaming-only figures based on certification alone.

== Release history ==
Country	Date	Label	Format
Australia	27 July 2012	Sony	Digital download
New Zealand	27 July 2012	Sony	Digital download
Ireland	27 July 2012	Sony	Digital download
United Kingdom	29 July 2012	Fly Eye; Columbia	Digital download
United States	29 July 2012	Ultra	Digital download
