= Universus =

Studio album by ShockOne
- Released: 26 April 2013
- Genre: Drum and bass
- Length: 69:46
- Label: Viper
- Producer: Karl Thomas

ShockOne chronology
ShockOne (2009)	Universus (2013)	A Dark Machine (2019)

Universus is the debut studio album by Australian producer ShockOne, released on 26 April 2013 through Viper Recordings. It contains collaborations with Metrik, Reija Lee, Phetsta, Kyza and Sam Nafie. ShockOne toured Australia in promotion of the album. It reached number two on the Australian albums chart.

== Background ==
Karl Thomas described the "loose theme" of the album being "the lifespan of our universe", going on to say that he realised this was the theme "halfway through writing the album". He elaborated, "The term itself, 'universus', actually means everything right now. It's dealing with, as humans, our perception of reality and how we deal with the universe that we're in."

== Critical reception ==
Professional ratings
Review scores
Source	Rating
Sputnikmusic	3.5/5
The Sydney Morning Herald	3/5 stars

Will R. of Sputnikmusic described the album as "what the heavier variety of electronic music can do at its best" and wrote, "shockingly, almost the entire album is a pleasant and fun listen, even if it doesn't ever go too far below skin-deep", pointing out that "Lazerbeam" sounds like a Skrillex track and "Crucify Me" a song by Pendulum. The Sydney Morning Herald's Douglas Fry stated that it is "a loud and brash arrival, to be sure [...] but to call it unsubtle would be inaccurate" as it "revels in the power of cone-destroying bass, thundering percussion and soaring melodies, without choking out the light and shade elements that make ShockOne such an impressive producer".

== Track listing ==
Universus track listing
No.	Title	Length
1.	"Singularity (The Monochord of Creation)"	1:17
2.	"Chaos Theory"	5:11
3.	"Harmonize"	5:11
4.	"Home" (featuring Reija Lee)	7:13
5.	"Big Bounce"	4:48
6.	"Lose Control"	6:01
7.	"Crucify Me" (featuring Phetsta)	5:26
8.	"Universes" (featuring Phetsta and Reija Lee)	5:31
9.	"Lazerbeam" (featuring Metrik and Kyza)	4:23
10.	"Infinity's Silence"	6:02
11.	"Relapse" (featuring Sam Nafie)	5:03
12.	"Age of Enlightenment"	5:02
13.	"Light Cycles (Prelude)"	1:44
14.	"Light Cycles"	6:54
Total length:		69:46

== Charts ==
Chart performance for Universus
Chart (2013)	Peak position
Australian Albums (ARIA)	2
