= Thinking About You (Calvin Harris song) =

2013 single by Calvin Harris

Single by Calvin Harris featuring Ayah Marar

from the album 18 Months
- Released: 2 August 2013
- Recorded: 2012
- Genre: House
- Length: 4:07
- Label: Deconstruction; Fly Eye; Columbia
- Songwriters: Calvin Harris; Ayah Marar; Scott Harris
- Producer: Calvin Harris

Calvin Harris singles chronology
"I Need Your Love" (2013)	"Thinking About You" (2013)	"Under Control" (2013)

Ayah Marar singles chronology
"Thinking About You" (2013)

Music video
- "Thinking About You" on YouTube

"Thinking About You" is a song by Scottish DJ and record producer Calvin Harris, featuring Jordanian singer Ayah Marar. It was released on 2 August 2013 as the eighth and final single from Harris' third studio album, 18 Months (2012). The song was written by Harris and Marar, who previously worked together on Harris's promotional single, "Let Me Know" (2004) and "Flashback" (2009), the third single from his second studio album, Ready for the Weekend.

The song debuted and peaked at number 8 on the UK Singles Chart, giving Harris his ninth UK top 10 single from 18 Months and making him the first artist in history to have nine UK top 10 singles from one album. His record was surpassed in March 2017 by Ed Sheeran, whose third studio album ÷ includes ten top 10 hits.

== Chart performance ==
On 11 August 2013, the song climbed to number 8 in the UK, giving Harris his ninth top-10 hit from 18 Months (counting "We Found Love", on which Harris was listed as a featured artist, as a single from 18 Months) and breaking his own chart record in the process. On Billboard's Dance/Mix Show Airplay chart, the song became his fifth consecutive number one.

== Music video ==
The official music video was uploaded to Harris's Vevo account on 15 July 2013. It was directed by Vincent Haycock and filmed in Los Angeles County off the coast of Santa Catalina Island. Establishing shots of Avalon, California and Santa Catalina Island were used to convey the Somali coast of East Africa. Some additional scenes were filmed in Avalon, specifically the fight scene of the teenage boy, which overlooks the city and Pacific Ocean towards the California mainland.

The video features a pool party, a rave, a boat party (which Marar is on) being hijacked by Somali pirates, a couple having sex on a plane and a beaten-up teenage boy taking out revenge by badly beating up the guy who did it to him. The video also features an appearance from Hurts member Theo Hutchcraft.

The music video aroused controversy in France due to the nudity, sexual content, firearms explicitly showed and several violent scenes. Later, the French Audiovisual Regulation would ban the video music from TV-broadcasting during the day and then would be broadcast with a warning Not advised to kids under 10 years old (déconseillé aux moins de 10 ans in French) or without (depending to music channels).

== Track listing and formats ==
Digital download — EP
No.	Title	Length
1.	"Thinking About You" (Jesse Rose Remix)	5:29
2.	"Thinking About You" (Laidback Luke Remix)	6:34
3.	"Thinking About You" (Michael Brun Remix)	5:42
4.	"Thinking About You" (Ludo Remix)	6:45
5.	"Thinking About You" (GTA Remix)	6:49
6.	"Thinking About You" (Firebeatz Remix)	5:53
7.	"Thinking About You" (EDX's Belo Horizonte At Night Remix)	6:51
8.	"Thinking About You" (Manufactured Superstars Remix)	6:53

== Charts ==
=== Weekly charts ===
Chart (2013–2014)	Peak position
Australia (ARIA)	28
Australia Dance (ARIA)	3
Austria (Ö3 Austria Top 40)	66
Belgium (Ultratop 50 Flanders)	20
Belgium (Ultratip Bubbling Under Flanders)	7
Belgium (Ultratop 50 Wallonia)	38
Belgium (Ultratip Bubbling Under Wallonia)	4
Canada Hot 100 (Billboard)	58
CIS Airplay (TopHit)	144
Czech Republic Airplay (ČNS IFPI)	78
France (SNEP)	92
Germany (GfK)	56
Hungary (Dance Top 40)	15
Hungary (Rádiós Top 40)	5
Ireland (IRMA)	11
Netherlands (Dutch Top 40)	18
Netherlands (Single Top 100)	35
New Zealand (Recorded Music NZ)	40
Poland Airplay (ZPAV)	11
Poland Dance (ZPAV)	7
Romania (Romanian Top 100)	62
Russia Airplay (TopHit)	193
Scotland Singles (OCC)	7
Switzerland (Schweizer Hitparade)	58
Ukraine Airplay (TopHit)	65
UK Singles (OCC)	8
UK Dance (OCC)	2
US Billboard Hot 100	86
US Hot Dance/Electronic Songs (Billboard)	9
US Dance Club Songs (Billboard)	50
US Pop Airplay (Billboard)	23
US Rhythmic Airplay (Billboard)	24

=== Monthly charts ===
Monthly chart performance for "Thinking About You"
Chart (2013)	Peak position
Ukraine Airplay (TopHit)	75

=== Year-end charts ===
Chart (2013)	Position
Hungary (Dance Top 40)	43
Hungary (Rádiós Top 40)	65
Netherlands (Dutch Top 40)	91
Netherlands (Single Top 100)	99
UK Singles (Official Charts Company)	92
US Hot Dance/Electronic Songs (Billboard)	48
Chart (2014)	Position
Hungary (Dance Top 40)	80
Hungary (Rádiós Top 40)	99
US Hot Dance/Electronic Songs (Billboard)	31

== Certifications ==
Region	Certification	Certified units/sales
Australia (ARIA)	2× Platinum	140,000^{‡}
Brazil (Pro-Música Brasil)	Platinum	60,000^{‡}
Canada (Music Canada)	Platinum	80,000^{‡}
Italy (FIMI)	Gold	25,000^{‡}
New Zealand (RMNZ)	Platinum	30,000^{‡}
United Kingdom (BPI)	Platinum	600,000^{‡}
United States (RIAA)	Platinum	1,000,000^{‡}
Streaming
Denmark (IFPI Danmark)	Gold	900,000^{†}
^{‡} Sales+streaming figures based on certification alone.^{†} Streaming-only figures based on certification alone.

== Release history ==
Region	Date	Format(s)
United Kingdom	2 August 2013	Digital download
United States	8 October 2013	Contemporary hit radio
