= Thinkin About =

2019 single by Lee Mvtthews

Single by ShockOne x Lee Mvtthews
- Released: 24 May 2022
- Genre: Drum and bass
- Length: 2:39
- Label: Dark Machine Records
- Songwriter(s): Janeva Burrill; Robbie Bergin; Karl Thomas
- Producer(s): ShockOne; Lee Mvtthews

ShockOne singles chronology
"Hardwired" (2021)	"Thinkin About" (2022)	"Collecting Thoughts" (2022)

Lee Mvtthews singles chronology
"Come Down" (2021)	"Thinkin About" (2022)	"Infinity" (2022)

"Thinkin About" is a song by Australian electronic music producer ShockOne in collaboration with New Zealand electronic music duo Lee Mvtthews. It was released as a single in May 2022, and reached number 19 on the New Zealand artists singles chart in 2023.

== Background and composition ==
DJ ShockOne approached Lee Mvtthews to work on a collaboration, providing them with the song's basic structure and vocals. Janeva Burrill's vocals were originally intended for another song, so Lee Mvtthews felt that working on the song was like creating a remix. The duo felt that the song had influences of Rüfüs Du Sol, Kanine and Flume, and that it had the "perfect blend of rave and radio", while ShockOne felt that the song captured the feeling of "hedonism and reckless abandon" of attending a rave with friends.

== Release and commercial reception ==
The song was released as a single on 24 May 2022, followed by two remixes of the song in September by Pulp Friction and T & Sugah. In October, ShockOne toured Australia and New Zealand with Lee Mvtthews, with their 'Dark Machine Records Warehouse' Tour. The song reached number 10 on the New Zealand Hot Singles Chart in May 2022, and number 19 on the New Zealand artists chart in 2023.

== Critical reception ==
Brendan McCarthy of muzic.net.nz gave the song four stars out of five, praising its ability to express "the exact musical representation [and] all the emotion involved" of a summer music festival. George FM named the song as their third biggest song of 2022.

== Credits and personnel ==
Credits adapted from Tidal.

- Robbie Bergin - songwriter
- Janeva Burrill - songwriter, vocals
- Lee Mvtthews - producer
- ShockOne - producer
- Karl Thomas - songwriter

== Charts ==
Chart (2022)	Peak position
New Zealand Hot Singles (Recorded Music NZ)	10
New Zealand Artist Singles (Recorded Music NZ)	19
