= Takeover (Lee Mvtthews song) =

2019 single by Lee Mvtthews

- Remix EP cover

Single by Lee Mvtthews featuring Nü

from the album Bones
- Released: November 2019
- Genre: Drum and bass
- Length: 3:51
- Songwriter(s): Tom Lee; Graham Matthews; Neferetiti Millar Tear

Lee Mvtthews singles chronology
"In the Dark" (2019)	"Takeover" (2019)	"Turning Back" (2020)

Nü singles chronology
"Clap" (2019)	"Takeover" (2019)	"Lights Out" (2021)

"Takeover" is a song by New Zealand electronic music duo Lee Mvtthews, in collaboration with the singer Nü. It was released as the lead single from their debut album Bones in 2019. The song became a hit in New Zealand in 2022, becoming double platinum certified and the 10th most successful song by a New Zealand artist for the year.

== Background and composition ==
The song was written by the band members and Nü to express believing in yourself.

== Release and commercial reception ==
The song was released as a single to New Zealand radio during the release of their album Bones in November 2019. In December 2021, the band released a remix EP for "Takeover". The song became a hit in New Zealand in 2022.

== Critical reception ==
Jamie Denton of muzic.net.nz felt that "Takeover" was one of the highlight tracks on Bones, praising its "old-school" sound, and feeling that it was reminiscent of songs found on late 1990s/early 2000s Gatecrasher and Ministry of Sound compilation albums. Tim Gruar of Ambient Light praised Nü's vocals, saying that "her voice is robust enough to hold up under the architecture of such a kaleidoscopic infrastructure". He described the song as "a great tune" although "a little repetitive".

== Credits and personnel ==
Credits adapted from Tidal.

- Tom Lee - songwriter
- Graham Matthews - songwriter
- Nü - featured artist
- Neferetiti Millar Teare - songwriter

== Charts ==
=== Weekly charts ===
Chart (2022)	Peak position
New Zealand (Recorded Music NZ)	27

=== Year-end charts ===
Chart (2022)	Position
New Zealand Artist Singles (Recorded Music NZ)	10

== Certifications ==
Certifications and sales for "Takeover"
Region	Certification	Certified units/sales
New Zealand (RMNZ)	3× Platinum	90,000^{‡}
^{‡} Sales+streaming figures based on certification alone.
