= Drinking from the Bottle =

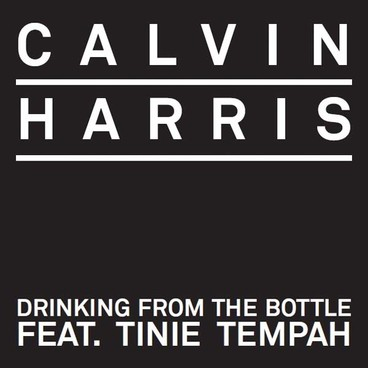

Single by Calvin Harris featuring Tinie Tempah

from the album 18 Months
- Released: 27 January 2013
- Recorded: 2012
- Genre: Hip house
- Length: 4:00
- Label: Deconstruction; Fly Eye; Columbia
- Songwriters: Calvin Harris; Patrick Okogwu; James F. Reynolds; Mark Knight
- Producers: Calvin Harris; James F. Reynolds; Mark Knight

Calvin Harris singles chronology
| "Sweet Nothing" (2012) | "Drinking from the Bottle" (2013) | "I Need Your Love" (2013) |

Tinie Tempah singles chronology
| "R.I.P." (2012) | "Drinking from the Bottle" (2013) | "Trampoline" (2013) |

Audio sample
- file; help

Music video
- "Drinking from the Bottle" on YouTube

"Drinking from the Bottle" is a song by Scottish DJ and record producer Calvin Harris from his third studio album, 18 Months. The song features British Nigerian rapper Tinie Tempah. The song was released as a single on 27 January 2013 and later peaked at number five on the UK Singles Chart.

== Music video ==
A lyric video to accompany the release of "Drinking from the Bottle" was first released onto YouTube on 2 December 2012 at a total length of four minutes and one second. The official video was uploaded to Harris's YouTube's account on 21 December, after being filmed in the first week of December 2012.

The video opens with actor Brad Dourif, as The Devil, speaking to his friend "Patrick" (Vader Vader) lead singer, Pat-Ric (McCaffery) Nasty, who is dressed as a wizard), talking about how he had sex with Joan of Arc in 1430, just a few months before her burning at the stake. The rest of the video features Harris and Tempah in a dark room with scantily-clad women, with Harris sitting inside a car and Tempah outside it. There are also scenes of drinking, drugs, violence, arson, sex, twerking and nudity, as well as Harris and Tempah meeting up with the devil. The video was accompanied by a parental advisory explicit content sign for extremely sexually explicit content and some strong language.

== Critical reception ==
Robert Copsey of Digital Spy gave the song three out of five stars and wrote, "With lyrics about necking booze from buckets with sparklers, name-checking Rihanna, the Kardashians and, erm, Danny DeVito as well as a ravey breakdown that you could set your watch to, they've ticked all the necessary boxes for an easy chart hit. 'I know this crazy life can be a bitter pill to swallow,' he continues, prompting our weary response: 'Go on then, one last time won't hurt us... right?'."

== Live performances ==
Harris and Tempah gave their first live performance of "Drinking from the Bottle" on The Jonathan Ross Show on 3 November 2012.

== Track listing ==
Digital download
| No. | Title | Length |
|---|---|---|
| 1. | "Drinking from the Bottle" (featuring Tinie Tempah) | 4:00 |
| 2. | "Drinking from the Bottle" (Andy Light Remix) | 5:24 |
| 3. | "Drinking from the Bottle" (Extended Mix) | 6:02 |

== Personnel ==
- Lead vocals – Patrick Okogwu
- Guest vocals – Calvin Harris, Tinie Tempah
- Producers – Calvin Harris, James F. Reynolds, Mark Knight

== Charts ==
=== Weekly charts ===
Weekly chart performance for "Drinking from the Bottle"
| Chart (2013) | Peak position |
|---|---|
| Australia (ARIA) | 16 |
| Belgium (Ultratop 50 Flanders) | 34 |
| Belgium (Ultratip Bubbling Under Wallonia) | 2 |
| CIS Airplay (TopHit) | 2 |
| Czech Republic Airplay (ČNS IFPI) | 8 |
| France (SNEP) | 62 |
| Hungary (Dance Top 40) | 17 |
| Hungary (Rádiós Top 40) | 14 |
| Iceland (Tonlist) | 21 |
| Ireland (IRMA) | 9 |
| Italy (Musica e Dischi) | 46 |
| Mexican Ingles Airplay (Billboard) | 26 |
| Netherlands (Dutch Tipparade 40) | 4 |
| Netherlands (Single Top 100) | 83 |
| New Zealand (Recorded Music NZ) | 34 |
| Romania (Romanian Top 100) | 82 |
| Russia Airplay (TopHit) | 4 |
| Scotland Singles (Official Charts) | 3 |
| Slovakia Airplay (ČNS IFPI) | 27 |
| Sweden (Sverigetopplistan) | 53 |
| UK Radio Airplay (Nielsen Soundscan) | 10 |
| UK Singles (Official Charts) | 5 (Note: The UK Singles Chart peak position is for a sales-only chart. Streaming Chart data was not incorporated until July 2014.) |
| UK Streaming (Official Charts) | 2 |
| UK TV Airplay (Nielsen Soundscan) | 2 |
| UK Dance (Official Charts) | 1 |
| US Dance Club Songs (Billboard) | 23 |
| US Hot Dance/Electronic Songs (Billboard) | 20 |

=== Year-end charts ===
2013 year-end chart performance for "Drinking from the Bottle"
| Chart (2013) | Position |
|---|---|
| Hungary (Dance Top 40) | 53 |
| Hungary (Rádiós Top 40) | 96 |
| Russia Airplay (TopHit) | 25 |
| UK Singles (OCC) | 40 |
| US Hot Dance/Electronic Songs (Billboard) | 67 |

== Certifications ==
Certifications and sales for "Drinking from the Bottle"
| Region | Certification | Certified units/sales |
|---|---|---|
| Australia (ARIA) | 2× Platinum | 140,000^{^} |
| Italy (FIMI) | Gold | 15,000^{*} |
| New Zealand (RMNZ) | Gold | 7,500^{*} |
| Sweden (GLF) | Platinum | 40,000^{‡} |
| United Kingdom (BPI) | Platinum | 600,000^{‡} |
Streaming
| Denmark (IFPI Danmark) | Platinum | 1,800,000^{†} |
^{*} Sales figures based on certification alone.^{^} Shipments figures based on certification alone.^{‡} Sales+streaming figures based on certification alone.^{†} Streaming-only figures based on certification alone.
