= Lee Mvtthews =

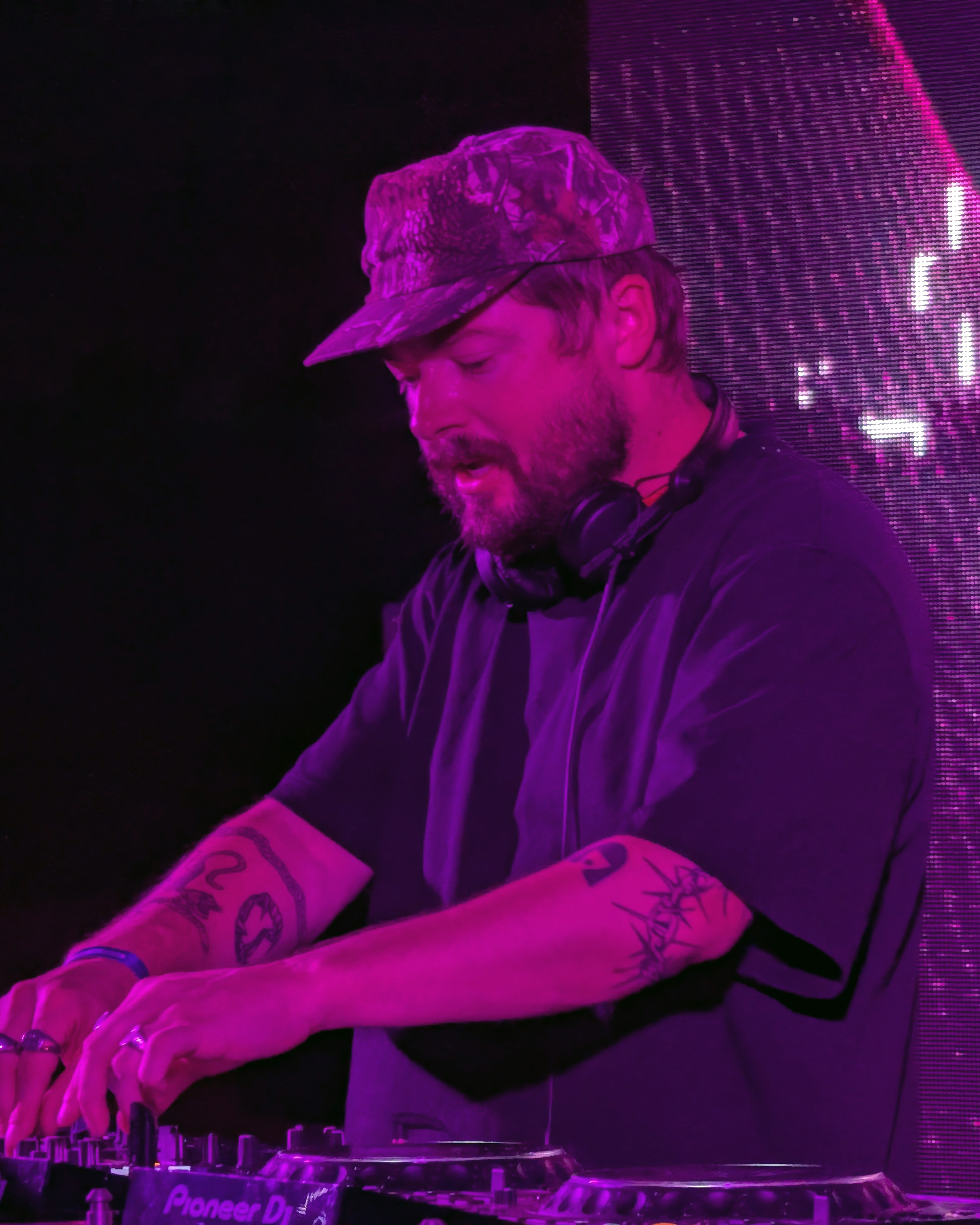
- Graham Matthews performing in February, 2026

Background information
- Genre: Drum and bass
- Years active: 2014–present
- Members: Tom Lee; Graham Matthews

Lee Mvtthews is a New Zealand drum and bass duo, who debuted in 2014. They released their debut album Bones in 2019. The lead single from the album, "Takeover", was a hit in New Zealand in 2022, becoming triple platinum certified.

== Biography ==
Tom Lee was born in the United Kingdom and grew up in Christchurch, while Graham Matthews was raised in Tauranga. Both moved to Auckland in 2012, and met at a DJ course at the Music and Audio Institute of New Zealand. They began collaborating on school projects after finding out that they had similar tastes in music, and in late 2013 began releasing music under the name Joystix. In 2014, the duo released their debut single, "I Got You". The group changed their name to Lee Matthews, after each members' surname, and decided to change the spelling to Lee Mvtthews, due to the Irish country singer Lee Matthews. In 2017, Lee Mvtthews released their debut extended play Silhouettes.

The group released their debut album Bones in November 2019, winning the Aotearoa Music Award for Best Electronic Artist at the 2020 Aotearoa Music Awards. In 2020, the band became the first signee to Perth DJ ShockOne's Dark Machine Records in 2020. The album's lead single "Takeover" became a hit in New Zealand in 2022.

== Discography ==
=== Studio albums ===
List of albums, with selected details
Title	Details	Peak chart positions
Title	Details	NZ Artist
Bones	Released: 1 November 2019; Format: Digital download, streaming, vinyl; Label: Lee Mvtthews	16
Exit	Released: 1 March 2024; Format: Digital download, streaming, vinyl; Label: Lee Mvtthews	7

=== Extended plays ===
List of EPs, with selected details
Title	Details
Silhouettes	Released: 24 November 2017; Format: Digital download, streaming; Label: Lee Mvtthews

=== Singles ===
Title	Year	Peak chart positions	Certifications	Album
Title	Year	NZ	Certifications	Album
"I Got U"	2014	—		Non-album singles
"Back 2 Back"	2015	—		Non-album singles
"Stay" (featuring Omega Levine)	2018	—		Non-album singles
"Inside Out" (featuring Watson)	2018	—		Non-album singles
"Fool"	2018	—		Non-album singles
"Let Me Go" (featuring Embher)	2018	—		Non-album singles
"Bones" (featuring Kaysh)	2019	— (Note: "Bones" did not enter the Official Top 40 Singles Chart, but peaked at number 28 on the Hot 40 Singles Chart.)		Bones
"If Only"	2019	—		Bones
"In the Dark" (featuring Abby Christo)	2019	—		Bones
"Takeover" (featuring NÜ)	2019	27	RMNZ: 3× Platinum	Bones
"Turning Back"	2020	— (Note: "Turning Back" did not enter the Official Top 40 Singles Chart, but peaked at number 24 on the Hot 40 Singles Chart.)		Non-album singles
"Discipline" (with Ekko & Sidetrack)	2020	—		Non-album singles
"Don't Say It" (featuring Prins)	2020	— (Note: "Don't Say It" did not enter the Official Top 40 Singles Chart, but peaked at number 18 on the Hot 40 Singles Chart.)	RMNZ: Gold	Non-album singles
"Reason" (with Flowidus)	2020	—		Non-album singles
"In a Moment" (featuring Watson)	2021	— (Note: "In a Moment" did not enter the Official Top 40 Singles Chart, but peaked at number 11 on the Hot 40 Singles Chart.)		Non-album singles
"Lights Out" / "Control"	2021	—		Non-album singles
"Underground" (Grafix, Lee Mvtthews, Elipsa)	2021	— (Note: "Underground" did not enter the Official Top 40 Singles Chart, but peaked at number 11 on the Hot 40 Singles Chart.)		Non-album singles
"Come Down" (featuring Prins)	2021	— (Note: "Come Down" did not enter the Official Top 40 Singles Chart, but peaked at number 18 on the Hot 40 Singles Chart.)		Non-album singles
"Thinkin About" (ShockOne & Lee Mvtthews)	2021	— (Note: "Thinkin About" did not enter the Official Top 40 Singles Chart, but peaked at number 10 on the Hot 40 Singles Chart.)		Non-album singles
"Infinity" (Freaks & Geeks and Lee Mvtthews)	2022	— (Note: "Infinity" did not enter the Official Top 40 Singles Chart, but peaked at number 40 on the Hot 40 Singles Chart.)		Non-album singles
"Dice" (featuring Rachel Leo)	2022	— (Note: "Dice" did not enter the Official Top 40 Singles Chart, but peaked at number 13 on the Hot 40 Singles Chart.)		Non-album singles
"Perfect Sky" (with Futurebound and Asha)	2023	— (Note: "Perfect Sky" did not enter the Official Top 40 Singles Chart, but peaked at number 22 on the Hot 40 Singles Chart.)		Non-album singles
"Far Gone" (featuring Degs)	2023	— (Note: "Far Gone" did not enter the Official Top 40 Singles Chart, but peaked at number 16 on the Hot 40 Singles Chart.)		Exit
"Talk to Me"	2023	— (Note: "Talk to Me" did not enter the Official Top 40 Singles Chart, but peaked at number 39 on the Hot 40 Singles Chart.)		Exit
"Kick the Doors Down" (with Tiki Taane)	2024	— (Note: "Kick the Doors Down" did not enter the Official Top 40 Singles Chart, but peaked at number 15 on the Hot 40 Singles Chart.)		Exit
"Circles" (featuring Amila)	2024	— (Note: "Circles" did not enter the Official Top 40 Singles Chart, but peaked at number 27 on the Hot 40 Singles Chart.)		Exit
"Can't Get Enough" (featuring Ella Monnery)	2024	— (Note: "Can't Get Enough" did not enter the Official Top 40 Singles Chart, but peaked at number 28 on the Hot 40 Singles Chart.)		Exit
"Take Me Anywhere" (featuring Kate McGill)	2024	— (Note: "Take Me Anywhere" did not enter the Official Top 40 Singles Chart, but peaked at number 24 on the Hot 40 Singles Chart.)		Non-album singles
"Feel Good" (with Krakota)	2024	— (Note: "Feel Good" did not enter the Official Top 40 Singles Chart, but peaked at number 35 on the Hot 40 Singles Chart.)		Non-album singles
"Ready 4 It"	2025	— (Note: "Ready 4 It" did not enter the Official Top 40 Singles Chart, but peaked at number 32 on the Hot 40 Singles Chart.)		Non-album singles
"Made for You" (with NÜ)	2025	— (Note: "Made for You" did not enter the Official Top 40 Singles Chart, but peaked at number 29 on the Hot 40 Singles Chart.)		Non-album singles
"U&I" (with Raphaella)	2026	— (Note: "U&I" did not enter the Official Top 40 Singles Chart, but peaked at number 25 on the Hot 40 Singles Chart.)		Non-album singles

=== Other charted songs ===
Title	Year	Peak chart positions	Album
Title	Year	NZ Hot	Album
"Runaway" (featuring Amila)	2024	37	Exit

=== Remixes ===
Title	Year	Other artists
"6 Figures (Lee Mvtthews Remix)"	2018	Kings
"Harmony (Lee Mvtthews Remix)"	2021	Origin8a & Propa, Benny Page
"All This Time (Lee Mvtthews Remix)"	2021	Drax Project
"Futures (Lee Mvtthews Remix)"	2022	Shapeshifter
"Soldiers of Fire (Lee Mvtthews Remix)"	2023	Tiki Taane, Tali
