= I Need Your Love (Calvin Harris song) =

Single by Calvin Harris featuring Ellie Goulding

from the album 18 Months
- Released: 2 April 2013
- Recorded: 2012
- Studio: Fly Eye, London
- Genre: EDM; dance-pop
- Length: 3:54
- Label: Deconstruction; Fly Eye; Columbia
- Songwriters: Calvin Harris; Ellie Goulding
- Producer: Calvin Harris

Calvin Harris singles chronology
"Drinking from the Bottle" (2013)	"I Need Your Love" (2013)	"Thinking About You" (2013)

Ellie Goulding singles chronology
"Explosions" (2013)	"I Need Your Love" (2013)	"Burn" (2013)

Calvin Harris and Ellie Goulding singles chronology
"I Need Your Love" (2013)	"Outside" (2014)

Music video
- "I Need Your Love" on YouTube

"I Need Your Love" is a song by the Scottish DJ and record producer Calvin Harris from his third studio album, 18 Months (2012). The song features vocals from English singer-songwriter Ellie Goulding and was released on 2 April 2013 as the album's seventh single. "I Need Your Love" is also included as a bonus track on Goulding's second studio album, Halcyon (2012). The accompanying music video, directed by Emil Nava, depicts Harris and Goulding as a romantic couple on a trip to Miami.

"I Need Your Love" received favourable reviews from critics. The song reached number four on the UK Singles Chart, making Harris the first artist in UK chart history to attain eight top-10 entries from one studio album. It also reached the top five in Australia, Austria, Finland, and Sweden, the top 10 in Belgium, Ireland and Switzerland, and the top 20 in the United States. At the 2014 Brit Awards, the song was nominated for British Single of the Year, while the music video was nominated for British Video of the Year.

== Composition ==
Sheet music for the song shows the key of C minor and follows a chord progression of Cm—A♭—E♭—B♭. The song has a tempo of 125 beats per minute, with vocals ranging from B♭_{3} to C_{5}.

== Critical reception ==
"I Need Your Love" received primarily positive reviews from music critics. Robert Copsey of Digital Spy rated the song four out of five stars, stating that "it's [Goulding's] distinctively soft-yet-throaty vocal that lifts it from the generic into something special." Sam Lansky of Idolator wrote that Goulding's "characteristically fragile, twee vocals [...] sound even more haunting in the context of Harris' futuristic electro instrumentation", adding that Harris is "in fine form here." Billboard commented that Goulding's "fragile voice carries so much warmth that no amount of synthetic clutter can dim a line like, 'Tell me, do you feel the same?/Hold me in your arms again'", but felt that "Harris' beat is a bit too strenuous here".

== Commercial performance ==
Following the release of 18 Months, "I Need Your Love" debuted at number 85 on the UK Singles Chart and at number 58 on the Irish Singles Chart in early November 2012. The song re-entered the UK chart at number 75 during the week ending 17 March 2013, selling 3,256 copies. In its fourth week, the track jumped from number 41 to number 25 with 13,909 copies sold, becoming Harris's 16th top-40 single and Goulding's ninth. On 21 April 2013, when "I Need Your Love" jumped from number eleven to number seven with sales of 33,052 copies, Harris made chart history by becoming the first artist to achieve eight UK top-10 singles from one studio album, breaking the previous record of seven set by Michael Jackson's 1987 album Bad and subsequently equalled by 1991's Dangerous. The single jumped to its peak position of number four the following week, selling 43,971 copies. As of August 2013, "I Need Your Love" had sold 395,462 copies in the United Kingdom.

Since its debut, "I Need Your Love" peaked at number six on the Irish chart. The song debuted at number 44 on the ARIA Singles Chart for the week commencing 11 March 2013, peaking at number three in its eighth week on the chart. In New Zealand, it entered the RIANZ Singles Chart at number 26 and peaked at number 15 for two consecutive weeks.

In the United States, the song debuted at number 76 on the Billboard Hot 100 and peaked at number 16, becoming Harris's fifth top-40 single and Goulding's second. "I Need Your Love" had sold one million downloads in the United States as of September 2013.

== Music videos ==
The music video for "I Need Your Love" was directed by Emil Nava and premiered on 14 April 2013. It shortens the track by omitting some of the intro music, starting immediately with Goulding's first lines.

The video starts with Goulding in bed, singing the song. She is joined by Harris, who is depicted to be in a romantic relationship with her. The video shifts to amateur-like footage of Goulding and Harris acting in an affectionate manner toward each other in different locations such as a resort, in a car, at a beach, and in a tattoo parlour. While the supposed "camcorder" is filming at a beach where Goulding and Harris once were, it gets picked up by an individual who films himself skateboarding and later playing billiards. Shots of Goulding and Harris flash throughout the video, and then it cuts back to the billiards scene, however, the first individual is nowhere in sight, and instead, a biker prepares the billiards table before seeing the camcorder and taking it, using it to film himself riding a motorcycle along a highway.

After this, the camcorder is picked up from the sidewalk by a third individual, who uses it to film a helicopter tour of Miami. Then, it is given to another individual jet skiing until he seems to lose the camcorder. Subsequently, the camcorder is found floating in the water by a fifth individual who herself and another film each other on a boat cruise and later in a nightclub where Harris is performing as a DJ. Harris is then seen dancing with Goulding from afar. As the camera moves towards Harris, he reaches out and holds it, aiming the view at the nightclub's audience. Scenes of the music video flash back in rapid succession, leading to the ending of the video with Harris setting the camera down and getting into bed with Goulding in the same bedroom as at the beginning of the video.

The music video for "I Need Your Love" was nominated for Best Collaboration and Best Song of the Summer at the 2013 MTV Video Music Awards.

On 3 April 2015, an alternate music video for "I Need Your Love" was supposedly leaked online. This version of the video "has a darker theme. It centers mostly on Goulding as she wears an all-black outfit while singing alone in the middle of dim-lit place surrounded by fog." Throughout the video, it depicts a fight between two men; a young boy climbing a twisted tree that catches fire; a young girl screaming atop a boulder; a woman being hung in mid-air as it rains; a male carrying an unconscious woman to a mountain of candles; and Harris is seen walking around in the fog as well.

== Track listings ==
Digital download
No.	Title	Length
1.	"I Need Your Love" (Nicky Romero Remix)	5:44
2.	"I Need Your Love" (Jacob Plant Remix)	4:50

Austrian, German and Swiss CD single
No.	Title	Length
1.	"I Need Your Love"	3:58
2.	"I Need Your Love" (Nicky Romero Remix)	5:43

Austrian, German and Swiss digital download
No.	Title	Length
1.	"I Need Your Love"	3:54
2.	"I Need Your Love" (Jacob Plant Remix)	4:49
3.	"I Need Your Love" (Nicky Romero Remix)	5:43
4.	"I Need Your Love" (music video)	3:46

== Credits and personnel ==
Credits adapted from the liner notes of 18 Months.

=== Recording and management ===
- Recorded at Fly Eye Studio, London
- Mastered at The Exchange Mastering Studios, London
- Published by EMI Music Publishing / Global Publishing
- Ellie Goulding appears courtesy of Polydor Records, a division of Universal Music Operations Limited

=== Personnel ===
- Calvin Harris – production, all instruments
- Ellie Goulding – vocals
- Karen Thompson – mastering

== Charts ==
=== Weekly charts ===
Weekly chart performance for "I Need Your Love"
Chart (2013–2014)	Peak position
Australia (ARIA)	3
Australia Dance (ARIA)	2
Austria (Ö3 Austria Top 40)	3
Belgium (Ultratop 50 Flanders)	8
Belgium Dance (Ultratop Flanders)	2
Belgium (Ultratop 50 Wallonia)	7
Belgium Dance (Ultratop Wallonia)	1
Brazil (Hot 100 Airplay)	100
Brazil (Hot Pop Songs)	38
Canada Hot 100 (Billboard)	13
CIS Airplay (TopHit)	55
Czech Republic Airplay (ČNS IFPI)	1
Czech Republic Singles Digital (ČNS IFPI)	41
Denmark (Tracklisten)	17
Euro Digital Song Sales (Billboard)	7
Finland (Suomen virallinen lista)	4
France (SNEP)	10
Germany (GfK)	13
Hungary (Rádiós Top 40)	7
Hungary (Dance Top 40)	2
Ireland (IRMA)	6
Italy (FIMI)	18
Luxembourg Digital Song Sales (Billboard)	10
Netherlands (Dutch Top 40)	29
Netherlands (Single Top 100)	33
Netherlands (Dance Top 30)	5
New Zealand (Recorded Music NZ)	15
Norway (VG-lista)	13
Poland Dance (ZPAV)	4
Poland (Polish TV Airplay Chart)	1
Romania (Romanian Top 100)	95
Russia Airplay (TopHit)	67
Scottish Singles Sales (Official Charts)	3
Slovakia Airplay (ČNS IFPI)	1
Slovakia Singles Digital (ČNS IFPI)	79
Slovenia (SloTop50)	17
South Africa Airplay (EMA)	5
Spain (Promusicae)	25
Sweden (Sverigetopplistan)	3
Switzerland (Schweizer Hitparade)	6
UK Singles (Official Charts)	4
UK Dance (Official Charts)	3
Ukraine Airplay (TopHit)	46
US Billboard Hot 100	16
US Adult Pop Airplay (Billboard)	23
US Dance Club Songs (Billboard)	1
US Hot Dance/Electronic Songs (Billboard)	3
US Latin Pop Airplay (Billboard)	27
US Pop Airplay (Billboard)	6
US Rhythmic Airplay (Billboard)	14

=== Year-end charts ===
2013 year-end chart performance for "I Need Your Love"
Chart (2013)	Position
Australia (ARIA)	32
Australia Dance (ARIA)	15
Austria (Ö3 Austria Top 40)	28
Belgium (Ultratop 50 Flanders)	23
Belgium Dance (Ultratop Flanders)	12
Belgium (Ultratop 50 Wallonia)	40
Belgium Dance (Ultratop Wallonia)	8
Canada (Canadian Hot 100)	45
France (SNEP)	44
Germany (Official German Charts)	39
Hungary (Dance Top 40)	2
Hungary (Rádiós Top 40)	31
Italy (FIMI)	55
Netherlands (Dutch Top 40)	150
Netherlands (Mega Dance Top 30)	18
Russia Airplay (TopHit)	193
Sweden (Sverigetopplistan)	16
Switzerland (Schweizer Hitparade)	45
UK Singles (Official Charts Company)	32
US Billboard Hot 100	56
US Dance Club Songs (Billboard)	24
US Hot Dance/Electronic Songs (Billboard)	9
US Pop Airplay (Billboard)	21
US Radio Songs (Billboard)	36

2014 year-end chart performance for "I Need Your Love"
Chart (2014)	Position
Hungary (Dance Top 40)	39
US Hot Dance/Electronic Songs (Billboard)	43

== Certifications ==
Certifications and sales for "I Need Your Love"
Region	Certification	Certified units/sales
Australia (ARIA)	5× Platinum	350,000^{‡}
Austria (IFPI Austria)	Gold	15,000^{*}
Belgium (BRMA)	Gold	15,000^{*}
Brazil (Pro-Música Brasil)	Diamond	250,000^{‡}
Canada (Music Canada)	4× Platinum	320,000^{‡}
Germany (BVMI)	Platinum	300,000^{^}
Italy (FIMI)	Platinum	30,000^{*}
New Zealand (RMNZ)	2× Platinum	60,000^{‡}
Spain (Promusicae)	Platinum	60,000^{‡}
Sweden (GLF)	2× Platinum	80,000^{‡}
Switzerland (IFPI Switzerland)	Platinum	30,000^{^}
United Kingdom (BPI)	2× Platinum	1,200,000^{‡}
United States (RIAA)	3× Platinum	3,000,000^{‡}
Streaming
Denmark (IFPI Danmark)	2× Platinum	3,600,000^{†}
^{*} Sales figures based on certification alone.^{^} Shipments figures based on certification alone.^{‡} Sales+streaming figures based on certification alone.^{†} Streaming-only figures based on certification alone.

== Release history ==
Release dates for "I Need Your Love"
Region	Date	Format(s)	Ref.
United States	2 April 2013	Contemporary hit radio	
Australia	12 April 2013	Digital download	
Belgium	12 April 2013	Digital download	
Canada	12 April 2013	Digital download	
Denmark	12 April 2013	Digital download	
Finland	12 April 2013	Digital download	
France	12 April 2013	Digital download	
Ireland	12 April 2013	Digital download	
Italy	12 April 2013	Digital download	
Japan	12 April 2013	Digital download	
Luxembourg	12 April 2013	Digital download	
Netherlands	12 April 2013	Digital download	
New Zealand	12 April 2013	Digital download	
Norway	12 April 2013	Digital download	
Spain	12 April 2013	Digital download	
Sweden	12 April 2013	Digital download	
United Kingdom	12 April 2013	Digital download	
United States	12 April 2013	Digital download	
Austria	10 May 2013	CD; digital download	
Germany	10 May 2013	CD; digital download	
Switzerland	10 May 2013	CD; digital download	

== See also ==
- List of number-one dance singles of 2013 (U.S.)
