= 18 Months =

Studio album by Calvin Harris
- Released: 26 October 2012
- Recorded: 2010–2012
- Studios: Fly Eye, London (Note: Tracks 1–8 and 10–15); Westlake (Studio B), West Hollywood, California (Note: Track 4); White Villa, Ede, Netherlands (Note: Track 7); The Clubhouse (Note: Vocals on track 10); Cage at Belly of the Beast, London (Note: Vocals on track 12)
- Genre: EDM
- Length: 49:47
- Labels: Deconstruction; Fly Eye; Columbia
- Producers: Dillon Francis; Calvin Harris; Mark Knight; James F. Reynolds; Nicky Romero

Calvin Harris chronology
Ready for the Weekend (2009)	18 Months (2012)	Motion (2014)

Singles from 18 Months
- 1. "Bounce" Released: 10 June 2011; 2. "Feel So Close" Released: 19 August 2011; 3. "Let's Go" Released: 30 March 2012; 4. "We'll Be Coming Back" Released: 27 July 2012; 5. "Sweet Nothing" Released: 12 October 2012; 6. "Drinking from the Bottle" Released: 27 January 2013; 7. "I Need Your Love" Released: 2 April 2013; 8. "Thinking About You" Released: 2 August 2013

18 Months is the third studio album by Scottish DJ and record producer Calvin Harris. It was released on 26 October 2012 by Deconstruction, Fly Eye and Columbia Records. It marked Harris's first album to not primarily feature him on vocals, instead focusing more on songwriting and production. The album also shows a shift from Harris' usual nu disco-style songs, focusing more on an electro house style. A commercial success, 18 Months debuted at number one in his native Scotland and in the United Kingdom, earning Harris his second consecutive number-one album on the UK Albums Charts.

It was supported by the singles "Bounce", "Feel So Close", "Let's Go", "We'll Be Coming Back", "Sweet Nothing", "Drinking from the Bottle", "I Need Your Love" and "Thinking About You", all of which, along with "We Found Love" as a featured artist, led by Rihanna, reached the top 10 of the UK Singles Chart, making 18 Months the first album in history to spawn nine top-10 singles. "Let's Go" and "Sweet Nothing" were nominated for Best Dance Recording at the 55th and 56th Grammy Awards, respectively.

== Background ==
On 23 August 2012, Harris announced that the name of his forthcoming album would be titled 18 Months, and announced via his Twitter that the album would feature collaborations with artists including Rihanna, Ellie Goulding, Tinie Tempah, Dizzee Rascal, Ayah, Nicky Romero and Dillon Francis. The album marked the first time that Harris did not perform vocals on most of the album's tracks. He cited his reasons in an interview with the BBC as "being too much", as expressed his intent on focusing on being a producer, saying that he is "a producer, I make the songs, I can't stress that enough" and "I am the guy that writes them, makes them and mixes them. No-one really does that but that's what I'm good at".

18 Months became the first album to produce nine top ten singles from one album in the United Kingdom, surpassing the previous record set by Michael Jackson with seven singles from one album, with Billboard referring to the album as "one of the most important albums in dance music and modern pop history". The album marked a change for Harris, and for dance music overall as suggested by Kat Bein from Billboard, who said that Harris "unabashedly embraced big-room elements and pop-friendly song structures" on the album, and had "taken 2012’s pop-dance style then-championed by David Guetta to more critically-appealing heights".

The albums title inspired the name for Harris's first compilation album, and seventh studio album overall, 96 Months (2024). The album features Harris's songs from the nine years prior to the albums release in 2024, and as a result, does not feature any of the songs featured on 18 Months.

== Release and promotion ==
The album received praise from music critics, with Billboard describing the album as Harris's "most surefire bid to step out of the “Produced By” shadows and become a recognizable U.S. pop artist on his own". The album was released on 26 October 2012 in Germany, the Netherlands and Ireland, and on 29 October 2012 in the United Kingdom and France, before being released in the United States and Italy a day later. It was a commercial success for Harris, becoming his second number one album in the United Kingdom, and also reached number one on the albums charts in his native Scotland as well as on the Australian Dance Albums Charts and the Billboard Top Dance Albums Charts.

It finished 2012 as the 17th best selling album in the United Kingdom and 79th best selling album in Australia. It was subsequently certified 4× Platinum by the British Phonographic Industry (BPI) in the United Kingdom for sales in excess of 1.2 million copies, whilst in the United States it was certified Platinum by the Recording Industry Association of America (RIAA) for sales in excess of one million copies. Additionally, it was certified 2× Platinum in Australia, Brazil and Canada. It was nominated for the Grammy Award for Best Dance/Electronic Album at the 56th Annual Grammy Awards and Album of the Year at the Scottish Album of the Year Awards in 2013.

=== Singles ===
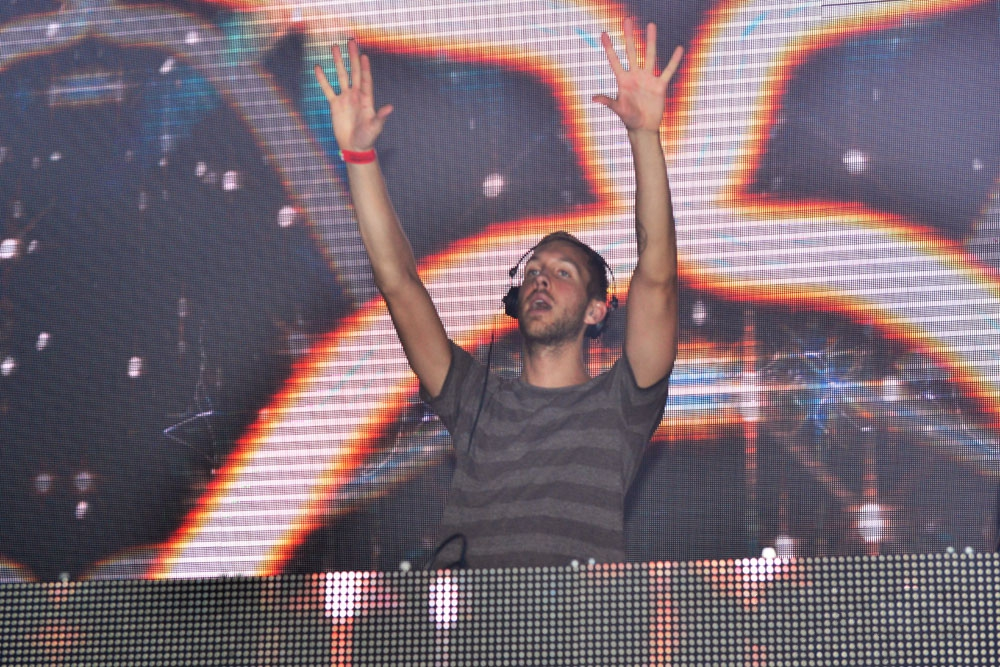
Harris performing at the Amnesia Nightclub, Ibiza, Spain, August 2012

"Bounce" was released as the album's lead single on 10 June 2011, featuring American R&B singer Kelis. The song peaked at number two in the United Kingdom, number six in Ireland and number seven in Australia. The second single "Feel So Close" was released on 19 August 2011, reaching number two in the United Kingdom and Ireland, and number seven in Australia. The song also became Harris's first solo single to chart on the Billboard Hot 100 in the United States, reaching number 12. "Let's Go" was released as the album's third single on 30 March 2012, and it features American R&B singer Ne-Yo. It peaked at number two in the United Kingdom, number six in Ireland and number 17 in Australia and the US. "Let's Go" received a nomination for Best Dance Recording at the 55th Grammy Awards in 2013. The track was used in Pepsi Max's Crowd Surfing television advert. "We'll Be Coming Back", featuring English singer and rapper Example, was released on 27 July 2012 as the fourth single from the album. It peaked at number two in the United Kingdom and number eight in Australia, while becoming both Harris's and Example's first solo single to reach number one in Ireland.

"Sweet Nothing" was released as the album's fifth single on 12 October 2012, featuring Florence Welch of English indie rock band Florence and the Machine. The song topped the charts in the UK and Ireland, becoming Harris and Welch's second collaborative number-one single, as well as the first UK chart-topper from 18 Months. It also debuted and peaked at number two in both Australia and New Zealand. In the US, the single peaked at number 10 on the Billboard Hot 100. "Sweet Nothing" was nominated for Best Dance Recording at the 56th Grammy Awards in 2014. "Drinking from the Bottle" was released as the album's sixth official single on 27 January 2013, featuring English rapper Tinie Tempah. The song reached number five in the UK and number nine in Ireland. "I Need Your Love", which features English singer Ellie Goulding, was released on 12 April 2013 as the seventh single from the album. The track reached number four in the UK and number six in Ireland, while charting inside the top five in countries such as Australia, Austria, Finland and Sweden. When "I Need Your Love" reached the UK top five in April 2013, Harris made chart history by becoming the first artist to attain eight top-10 singles from one studio album (including "We Found Love"), overtaking the record previously set by Michael Jackson. "Thinking About You", featuring Ayah Marar, was released on 2 August 2013 as the album's eighth and final single. It reached number eight in the UK, number 11 in Ireland, number 28 in Australia and number 40 in New Zealand.

=== Promotional singles ===
"Awooga" was released on 21 March 2011 through Harris's label Fly Eye Records. The accompanying music video consists of footage from his then-recent concerts in Australia. Harris's collaboration with Nicky Romero, "Iron", was released on Beatport on 10 September 2012 by Protocol Recordings.

== Critical reception ==
Professional ratings
Aggregate scores
Source	Rating
Metacritic	57/100
Review scores
Source	Rating
AllMusic	3/5 stars
The A.V. Club	C+
Entertainment Weekly	C+
The Guardian	2/5 stars
The Independent	3/5 stars
Los Angeles Times	2.5/4 stars
Metro	4/5
NME	6/10
The Observer	3/5 stars
PopMatters	5/10

18 Months received generally mixed reviews from music critics. At Metacritic, which assigns a normalised rating out of 100 to reviews from mainstream publications, the album received an average score of 57, based on 17 reviews. Fraser McAlpine of BBC Music hailed the album as a "collection almost exclusively in the key of triumph", as well as "a portfolio of win for Calvin, an annual report where the graph is almost all peaks and the troughs are so far down they're practically invisible." Arwa Haider of Metro commented that "18 Months could be a capsule collection of smash singles, yet it also works brilliantly as an album. That's partly because these are never faceless anthems; its singers [...] are well judged and rise to the songs, while the catchy hooks are lovingly arranged". AllMusic's Tim Sendra wrote that the album "shows Harris to be a solid producer with an easily identifiable sound." Mikael Wood of the Los Angeles Times noted that despite the variety of male collaborators, the album "only deepens the impression that Harris is best when linked with a lady; his skills in that area are several times more developed than they are anywhere else." The Independent's Andy Gill was unimpressed by Ellie Goulding's performance on "I Need Your Love", but complimented Welch on "Sweet Nothing", and cited Harris's collaboration with Nicky Romero on "Iron" as the album's "killer cut".

Emily Mackay of NME opined that "[t]he best collaborations stand alone, but the rest demands small hours and sweat to animate it", stating the album "feels more like a deserved victory lap than a forward step or a new instalment, but apart from his sole vocal on 'Feel So Close', the victor seems oddly absent." Killian Fox of The Observer remarked, "Nothing else on 18 Months matches up to the blockbusting collaborations with Kelis, Florence Welch and Rihanna", concluding that "Harris's production has become increasingly homogenised and, despite the array of vocalists, everything here risks sounding the same." At Entertainment Weekly, Melissa Maerz complimented songs like "We Found Love" and "I Need Your Love", but found that the album does not offer "many surprises". Despite referring to Harris as a "brilliant pop craftsman", The A.V. Club's Chris DeVille felt that the album "suffers from EDM fatigue" and that "almost every track eventually congeals into the same automaton thud." Evan Sawdey of PopMatters critiqued that "while 18 Months [...] is pretty much the hit-making monster that launched [Harris] in to the world spotlight, the truth of the matter is that it feels like a rather compromised vision of who he is an artist, sacrificing his quirkiness for a brooding new persona that starts to get stale over the course of a complete full-length." The Guardian critic Rebecca Nicholson expressed that "Harris knows how to make the most of his guests, leading them through a series of euphoric bangers that seem destined for success. But for all the pop divas he has roped in, there's a veneer of cynical, laddy EDM, resulting in the kind of tracks Skrillex might come up with on an Ayia Napa booze cruise."

== Commercial performance ==
18 Months debuted at number one on the UK Albums Chart with first-week sales of 52,356 copies, becoming Harris's second consecutive number-one album on the chart. The album fell to number four the following week, selling 34,734 copies. In its third week, it slipped to number nine with 24,689 units sold. In mid-January 2013, the album returned to number one for one week before slipping to number two. By July 2017, 18 Months had sold 923,861 copies in the United Kingdom. It also debuted at number one in his native Scotland, also becoming his second consecutive number one album in the country. In the United States, 18 Months sold 17,000 copies to debut at number 19 on the Billboard 200 and at number one on the Dance/Electronic Albums chart, becoming Harris's first album to enter the former chart. As of March 2014, it had sold 173,000 copies in the US. 18 Months had also sold over 25 million singles worldwide as of August 2013.

It achieved similar commercial success internationally, reaching the top ten in Australia, Canada, Ireland, Sweden and New Zealand, whilst it reached the top twenty in Norway. It finished 2012 as the 17th and 79th best selling album in the United Kingdom and Australia respectively. Additionally, it was the 48th best selling album of the 2010s decade in the United Kingdom.

== Track listing ==
All tracks are produced by Calvin Harris, except where noted.

No.	Title	Writer(s)	Producer(s)	Length
1.	"Green Valley"	Calvin Harris		1:49
2.	"Bounce" (featuring Kelis)	Harris		3:42
3.	"Feel So Close"	Harris		3:26
4.	"We Found Love" (Rihanna featuring Calvin Harris)	Harris	Harris; Kuk Harrell^{[a]}	3:35
5.	"We'll Be Coming Back" (featuring Example)	Harris; Example		3:54
6.	"Mansion"	Harris		2:07
7.	"Iron" (with Nicky Romero)	Harris; Romero	Harris; Romero	3:39
8.	"I Need Your Love" (featuring Ellie Goulding)	Harris; Goulding		3:54
9.	"Drinking from the Bottle" (featuring Tinie Tempah)	Harris; Tinie Tempah; James F. Reynolds; Mark Knight	Harris; Reynolds; Knight	4:00
10.	"Sweet Nothing" (featuring Florence Welch)	Harris; Welch; Kid Harpoon		3:32
11.	"School"	Harris		1:47
12.	"Here 2 China" (with Dillon Francis featuring Dizzee Rascal)	Harris; Dizzee Rascal; Francis	Harris; Francis	2:32
13.	"Let's Go" (featuring Ne-Yo)	Harris; Ne-Yo		3:53
14.	"Awooga"	Harris		3:51
15.	"Thinking About You" (featuring Ayah Marar)	Harris; Marar		4:07

Deluxe edition "18 Months (Continuous Mix)" bonus disc
No.	Title	Length
1.	"Bounce" (featuring Kelis)	3:42
2.	"Bounce" (R3hab Remix) (featuring Kelis)	5:24
3.	"Feel So Close"	3:26
4.	"We Found Love" (Extended Mix) (featuring Rihanna)	5:45
5.	"We'll Be Coming Back" (Original Extended Mix) (featuring Example)	6:33
6.	"We'll Be Coming Back" (Michael Woods Remix) (featuring Example)	5:20
7.	"Iron" (with Nicky Romero)	3:39
8.	"I Need Your Love" (featuring Ellie Goulding)	3:54
9.	"Drinking from the Bottle" (featuring Tinie Tempah)	4:00
10.	"Sweet Nothing" (Extended Mix) (featuring Florence Welch)	5:52
11.	"Let's Go" (Extended Mix) (featuring Ne-Yo)	6:00
12.	"Awooga" (Extended Mix)	7:14
13.	"Thinking About You" (featuring Ayah Marar)	4:07

iTunes Store deluxe edition bonus tracks
No.	Title	Length
16.	"Bounce" (R3hab Remix) (featuring Kelis)	5:24
17.	"We Found Love" (Extended Mix) (featuring Rihanna)	5:45
18.	"We'll Be Coming Back" (Original Extended Mix) (featuring Example)	6:33
19.	"We'll Be Coming Back" (Michael Woods Remix) (featuring Example)	5:20
20.	"Sweet Nothing" (Extended Mix) (featuring Florence Welch)	5:52
21.	"Let's Go" (Extended Mix) (featuring Ne-Yo)	6:00
22.	"Awooga" (Extended Mix)	7:14
23.	"18 Months" (Continuous Mix)	52:54
24.	"Bounce (Director's Cut)" (music video) (featuring Kelis)	4:29
25.	"Feel So Close (Director's Cut)" (music video)	4:06
26.	"Let's Go (Director's Cut)" (music video) (featuring Ne-Yo)	7:26
27.	"We'll Be Coming Back (Director's Cut)" (music video) (featuring Example)	4:07
28.	"Sweet Nothing (Director's Cut)" (music video) (featuring Florence Welch)	4:28

Japanese edition bonus tracks
No.	Title	Length
16.	"Bounce" (R3hab Remix) (featuring Kelis)	5:24
17.	"Feel So Close" (Benny Benassi Remix)	5:20
18.	"We'll Be Coming Back" (Michael Woods Remix) (featuring Example)	5:20
19.	"Sweet Nothing" (Tiësto Remix) (featuring Florence Welch)	5:08

== Personnel ==
Credits adapted from the liner notes of 18 Months.

=== Musicians ===
- Calvin Harris – arrangement (tracks 1–3, 5–7, 10, 11, 13, 14); all instruments (tracks 1–6, 8–15); vocals (tracks 3, 7)
- Kelis – vocals (track 2)
- Rihanna – vocals (track 4)
- Example – vocals (track 5)
- Nicky Romero – arrangement, all instruments (track 7)
- Ellie Goulding – vocals (track 8)
- James F. Reynolds – all instruments (track 9)
- Mark Knight – all instruments (track 9)
- Tinie Tempah – vocals (track 9)
- Florence Welch – vocals (track 10)
- Dillon Francis – all instruments (track 12)
- Dizzee Rascal – vocals (track 12)
- Ne-Yo – vocals (track 13)
- Ayah Marar – vocals (track 15)

=== Technical ===
- Calvin Harris – production (all tracks); mixing (track 4)
- Simon Davey – mastering (tracks 1, 5–7, 10–12, 14)
- Mike Marsh – mastering (tracks 2, 3, 5, 7, 13)
- Kuk Harrell – vocal production, vocal recording (track 4)
- Marcos Tovar – vocal recording (track 4)
- Phil Tan – mixing (track 4)
- Scott McCormick – engineering (track 5)
- Nicky Romero – production (track 7)
- Karen Thompson – mastering (track 8)
- James F. Reynolds – production (track 9)
- Mark Knight – production (track 9)
- Kid Harpoon – vocal recording (track 10)
- Dillon Francis – production (track 12)

== Charts ==
=== Weekly charts ===
Chart (2012–2014)	Peak position
Australian Albums (ARIA)	5
Australian Dance Albums (ARIA)	1
Austrian Albums (Ö3 Austria)	52
Belgian Albums (Ultratop Flanders)	50
Belgian Albums (Ultratop Wallonia)	44
Canadian Albums (Billboard)	8
Dutch Albums (Album Top 100)	24
Finnish Albums (Suomen virallinen lista)	38
French Albums (SNEP)	110
German Albums (Offizielle Top 100)	63
Irish Albums (IRMA)	2
Japanese Albums (Oricon)	28
Mexican Albums (Top 100 Mexico)	84
New Zealand Albums (RMNZ)	4
Norwegian Albums (VG-lista)	18
Scottish Albums (Official Charts)	1
Spanish Albums (Promusicae)	72
Swedish Albums (Sverigetopplistan)	6
Swiss Albums (Schweizer Hitparade)	30
UK Albums (Official Charts)	1
UK Dance Albums (Official Charts)	1
US Billboard 200	19
US Top Dance Albums (Billboard)	1

Chart (2025)	Peak position
Greek Albums (IFPI)	64
Portuguese Albums (AFP)	151

=== Year-end charts ===
Chart (2012)	Position
Australian Albums (ARIA)	79
Australian Dance Albums (ARIA)	8
UK Albums (OCC)	17

Chart (2013)	Position
Australian Albums (ARIA)	63
Australian Dance Albums (ARIA)	8
Belgian Albums (Ultratop Flanders)	174
Swedish Albums (Sverigetopplistan)	51
UK Albums (OCC)	18
US Top Dance/Electronic Albums (Billboard)	5

Chart (2014)	Position
Australian Dance Albums (ARIA)	29
Swedish Albums (Sverigetopplistan)	32
UK Albums (OCC)	72

Chart (2015)	Position
Australian Dance Albums (ARIA)	35
Swedish Albums (Sverigetopplistan)	78

Chart (2018)	Position
US Top Dance/Electronic Albums (Billboard)	24

Chart (2021)	Position
US Top Dance/Electronic Albums (Billboard)	10

Chart (2022)	Position
US Top Dance/Electronic Albums (Billboard)	19

Chart (2023)	Position
US Top Dance/Electronic Albums (Billboard)	15

Chart (2024)	Position
Australian Dance Albums (ARIA)	20
US Top Dance/Electronic Albums (Billboard)	17

Chart (2025)	Position
US Top Dance Albums (Billboard)	20

=== Decade-end charts ===
Chart (2010–2019)	Position
UK Albums (OCC)	48

== Certifications ==
Region	Certification	Certified units/sales
Australia (ARIA)	2× Platinum	140,000^{‡}
Brazil (Pro-Música Brasil)	2× Platinum	80,000^{‡}
Canada (Music Canada)	2× Platinum	160,000^{‡}
Denmark (IFPI Danmark)	Gold	10,000^{‡}
Germany (BVMI)	Gold	100,000^{‡}
Ireland (IRMA)	Gold	7,500^{^}
Italy (FIMI)	Gold	25,000^{‡}
Mexico (AMPROFON)	Platinum	60,000^{‡}
New Zealand (RMNZ)	3× Platinum	45,000^{‡}
Poland (ZPAV)	Platinum	20,000^{*}
Sweden (GLF)	Platinum	40,000^{‡}
United Kingdom (BPI)	4× Platinum	1,200,000^{‡}
United States (RIAA)	Platinum	1,000,000^{‡}
^{*} Sales figures based on certification alone.^{^} Shipments figures based on certification alone.^{‡} Sales+streaming figures based on certification alone.

== Release history ==
Region	Date	Format	Edition	Label	Ref.
Germany	26 October 2012	CD; digital download	Standard; deluxe	Sony	
Netherlands	26 October 2012	CD; digital download	Standard; deluxe	Sony	
Ireland	26 October 2012	CD; digital download	Standard; deluxe	Deconstruction; Fly Eye; Columbia	
United Kingdom	29 October 2012	CD; digital download	Standard; deluxe	Deconstruction; Fly Eye; Columbia	
France	29 October 2012	CD; digital download	Standard; deluxe	Jive Epic	
United States	30 October 2012	CD; digital download	Standard	Ultra; Roc Nation; Columbia	
Italy	30 October 2012	CD; digital download	Standard; deluxe	Sony	
Japan	31 October 2012	CD; digital download	Standard; deluxe	Sony	
Australia	2 November 2012	CD; digital download	Standard; deluxe	Sony	
Australia	2 November 2012	LP	Standard	Sony	
Germany	2 November 2012	LP	Standard	Sony	
United Kingdom	5 November 2012	LP	Standard	Deconstruction; Fly Eye; Columbia	

== See also ==
- List of 2012 albums
- List of UK Albums Chart number ones of the 2010s

== Notes ==
- ^{^[a]} signifies a vocal producer
