= Let's Go (Calvin Harris song) =

2012 song by Calvin Harris

Single by Calvin Harris featuring Ne-Yo

from the album 18 Months
- Released: 30 March 2012
- Recorded: 2011–2012
- Studio: Fly Eye Studios (London, England)
- Length: 3:53 (album version); 3:46 (radio edit)
- Label: Columbia; Deconstruction; Fly Eye; Ultra
- Songwriters: Calvin Harris; Shaffer Smith; Ellen Healy
- Producer: Calvin Harris

Calvin Harris singles chronology
"Off the Record" (2011)	"Let's Go" (2012)	"We'll Be Coming Back" (2012)

Ne-Yo singles chronology
"Leave You Alone" (2012)	"Let's Go" (2012)	"Lazy Love" (2012)

Music video
- "Let's Go" on YouTube

"Let's Go" is a song by Scottish DJ and record producer Calvin Harris featuring American singer Ne-Yo. The track was released in the United Kingdom on 30 March 2012 as the third single from Harris' third studio album, 18 Months (2012). On 29 April 2012, precisely a week after its release, "Let's Go" debuted at number two on the UK Singles Chart for the week ending dated 5 May 2012— marking Harris' third consecutive number two hit (held off by Carly Rae Jepsen's song "Call Me Maybe"). As of July 2012, the song has sold 376,000 downloads in the United States. It also appeared on the deluxe version of Ne-Yo's fifth studio album, R.E.D. The song received a nomination for Best Dance Recording at the 55th Grammy Awards held in February 2013.

The song was used for a Pepsi and Pepsi Max advert that features Lionel Messi, Didier Drogba, Fernando Torres, Wojciech Szczęsny, Frank Lampard, Sergio Agüero and Jack Wilshere. It was also used as the opening track to the London New Year’s Eve fireworks display for 2019–20. The Los Angeles Dodgers use this song when they hit a home run.

== Critical reception ==
Lewis Corner of Digital Spy gave the song a positive review stating:

"It's not about what you've done, it's about what you're doing," he aptly states over Calvin's unmistakable electronic flourishes of euphoric synths and speaker-jumping beats, which happens to soundtrack an impressive footballer-starring Pepsi Max ad campaign. Coincidentally, the final result isn't too different from the fizzy beverage; it's sparkling, addictive and sure to give you a burst of energy..

== Music video ==
The music video was released on 14 May 2012 on Vevo. It begins with the people all around the world doing something and also exciting things before one of them goes to the club where Harris is seen DJing the party. Ne-Yo also appears boxing at a gym and in the back seat in the car singing the song.

== Live performances ==
Ne-Yo performed "Let's Go" at the 2013 NBA All-Star Game, also incorporating Janet Jackson's "I Get Lonely" into the song. He also performed it at 1st Indonesian Choice Awards.

== Track listing ==
Digital download
No.	Title	Length
1.	"Let's Go" (Radio Edit)	3:46

CD single
No.	Title	Length
1.	"Let's Go" (Radio Edit)	3:46
2.	"Let's Go" (Extended Mix)	6:01

12-inch single
No.	Title	Length
1.	"Let's Go" (Extended Mix)	6:01
2.	"Let's Go" (Radio Edit)	3:46
3.	"Let's Go" (Calvin Harris Mix)	6:32

Digital EP
No.	Title	Length
1.	"Let's Go" (Radio Edit)	3:46
2.	"Let's Go" (Extended Mix)	6:01
3.	"Let's Go" (Calvin Harris Mix)	6:32
4.	"Let's Go" (Video)	3:54

== Charts ==
=== Weekly charts ===
Chart (2012)	Peak position
Australia (ARIA)	17
Austria (Ö3 Austria Top 40)	49
Belgium (Ultratop 50 Flanders)	31
Belgium (Ultratop 50 Wallonia)	27
Brazil Hot 100 Airplay (Billboard Brasil)	85
Canada Hot 100 (Billboard)	19
Denmark (Tracklisten)	29
France (SNEP)	117
Germany (GfK)	59
Honduras (Honduras Top 50)	11
Hungary (Rádiós Top 40)	5
Ireland (IRMA)	6
Japan Hot 100 (Billboard)	70
Netherlands (Dutch Top 40)	27
Netherlands (Single Top 100)	44
New Zealand (Recorded Music NZ)	14
Romania (Airplay 100)	62
Russia Airplay (TopHit)	64
Scottish Singles Sales (Official Charts)	2
Slovakia (IFPI)	18
Sweden (Sverigetopplistan)	51
Switzerland (Schweizer Hitparade)	40
UK Singles (Official Charts)	2
UK Dance (Official Charts)	1
US Billboard Hot 100	17
US Adult Pop Airplay (Billboard)	35
US Dance Club Songs (Billboard)	14
US Dance Airplay (Billboard)	1
US Pop Airplay (Billboard)	5
US Rhythmic Airplay (Billboard)	4

=== Year-end charts ===
Chart (2012)	Position
Canada (Canadian Hot 100)	66
Hungary (Rádiós Top 40)	78
UK Singles (Official Charts Company)	66
US Billboard Hot 100	65
US Dance/Mix Show Airplay (Billboard)	4
US Mainstream Top 40 (Billboard)	38
US Rhythmic (Billboard)	25

== Certifications ==
Region	Certification	Certified units/sales
Australia (ARIA)	2× Platinum	140,000^{‡}
Brazil (Pro-Música Brasil)	Platinum	60,000^{‡}
Canada (Music Canada)	Platinum	80,000^{*}
New Zealand (RMNZ)	Platinum	30,000^{‡}
Sweden (GLF)	Platinum	40,000^{‡}
United Kingdom (BPI)	Platinum	600,000^{‡}
United States (RIAA)	Gold	500,000^{‡}
Streaming
Denmark (IFPI Danmark)	Gold	900,000^{†}
^{*} Sales figures based on certification alone.^{‡} Sales+streaming figures based on certification alone.^{†} Streaming-only figures based on certification alone.

== Release history ==
Country	Date	Format	Label
Belgium	30 March 2012	Digital download	Columbia; Deconstruction; Fly Eye
New Zealand	30 March 2012	Digital download	Columbia; Deconstruction; Fly Eye
Ireland	20 April 2012	Digital download	Columbia; Deconstruction; Fly Eye
United Kingdom	22 April 2012	Digital download	Columbia; Deconstruction; Fly Eye
United States	22 May 2012	Mainstream radio airplay	Ultra
