= Bounce (Calvin Harris song) =

2011 single by Calvin Harris featuring Kelis

Single by Calvin Harris featuring Kelis

from the album 18 Months
- B-side: "Awooga"
- Released: 10 June 2011
- Recorded: Early 2011
- Studio: Fly Eye (London)
- Genre: Electro house; nu-disco
- Length: 3:42
- Label: Columbia; Deconstruction; Fly Eye
- Songwriter: Calvin Harris
- Producer: Calvin Harris

Calvin Harris singles chronology
"You Used to Hold Me" (2010)	"Bounce" (2011)	"Feel So Close" (2011)

Kelis singles chronology
"Brave" (2011)	"Bounce" (2011)	"Distance" (2012)

Music video
- "Bounce" on YouTube

"Bounce" is a song by Scottish DJ and record producer Calvin Harris. The song features American singer Kelis and is a move away from Harris singing, concentrating more on production. It was released on 10 June 2011 as the first single from Harris's third studio album, 18 Months (2012).

== Background ==
In November 2010, Harris claimed that he would no longer be singing on his tracks. He said, "I've stopped the live shows. I'm going to focus more on production and DJing and zero per cent of my time will go on singing. I'll do tracks with people who can sing well – proper artists, proper performers. I can focus on what I'm much better at, which is making music. I'm just not cut out for that role. I kind of fell into it a few years ago – the live show had to happen, I had to be the frontman because I was doing the vocals on the songs. It went all right. I spent a few years trying to get it really properly good, but it dawned on me it wasn't going to get much better. I've taken the singing thing as far as I can."

"Bounce" marked Harris's first single on which he did not provide the vocals. The song premiered on Annie Mac's show on BBC Radio 1 on 29 April 2011.

After the release of "Bounce", Harris released his follow-up single, "Feel So Close", and despite saying he would not be providing the vocals on his tracks, he returned to singing on the song.

== Critical reception ==
"Bounce" received generally positive reviews from contemporary critics. Lewis Corner from Digital Spy noted the successful transition of Harris's lack of vocals for the song saying "Kelis purrs over a midi-fied melody reminiscent of a classic Game Boy, before Harris takes the reins on the vocal-less chorus complete with bang-on-trend squiggly synths and head-bopping beats". Michael Cragg from The Guardian noted the club effect of the track saying "Opening with a pinging keyboard riff and Kelis intoning 'bounce', it soon morphs into a hands-in-the-air-ideally-holding-a-glow-stick dance monster, with Kelis's effortless cool keeping it's just the right side of parody." Sarah Deen from Metro noted the "hands-in-the-air chorus" but added "a marked improvement from his first single 'Merrymaking at My Place' but it's no 'I'm Not Alone'."

== Chart performance ==
"Bounce" first appeared on the UK Singles Chart at number two on 19 June 2011, behind Example's "Changed the Way You Kiss Me", despite appearing at number one on the mid-week update; this would be its highest-chart position. The single marked Harris's sixth top 10 single in the UK and the third most successful of these, behind "I'm Not Alone" and "Dance wiv Me"; both of which reached number-one. "Bounce" also marked the tenth top 10 single on the UK Singles Chart for Kelis. The single peaked at number one in Harris's native Scotland, becoming his third number one on the chart.

== Music video ==
The official music video was directed by Vincent Haycock. It premiered on Harris's Vevo channel in May 2011. The video features a cameo from Kelis as herself and American model AJ English, and was filmed in Las Vegas, Nevada, United States.

== Track listings ==
- CD single
1. "Bounce" (featuring Kelis) (Radio edit) – 3:42
2. "Bounce" (featuring Kelis) (R3hab Remix) – 5:23
3. "Bounce" (featuring Kelis) (Michael Woods Remix) – 5:36
- Digital download
1. "Bounce" (featuring Kelis) (Radio edit) – 3:42
2. "Awooga" – 7:13
3. "Bounce" (featuring Kelis) (Extended Mix) – 6:00
- Digital download – Remixes
1. "Bounce" (featuring Kelis) (Michael Woods Remix) – 5:36
2. "Bounce" (featuring Kelis) (R3hab Remix) – 5:23
3. "Bounce" (featuring Kelis) (Sandro Silva Remix) – 6:43
4. "Bounce" (featuring Kelis) (Fly Eye Club Mix) – 6:06
- Maxi-single
1. "Bounce" (Radio edit) – 3:42
2. "Bounce" (Extended mix) – 5:59
3. "Bounce" (Fly Eye Club Remix) – 6:06
4. "Bounce" (DJ R3HAB Remix) – 5:27
5. "Bounce" (Michael Woods Remix) – 5:39
6. "Bounce" (Sandro Silva Remix) – 6:46
7. "Awooga" – 7:13

== Charts ==
=== Weekly charts ===
Chart (2011)	Peak position
Australia (ARIA)	7
Belgium (Ultratop 50 Flanders)	7
Belgium Dance (Ultratop Flanders)	2
Belgium (Ultratip Bubbling Under Wallonia)	13
Denmark (Tracklisten)	4
Ireland (IRMA)	6
Mexico Airplay (Billboard)	46
Netherlands (Dutch Top 40)	28
Netherlands (Single Top 100)	27
New Zealand (Recorded Music NZ)	6
Norway (VG-lista)	18
Poland Dance (ZPAV)	30
Romania (Romanian Top 100)	65
Scottish Singles Sales (Official Charts)	1
UK Singles (Official Charts)	2
UK Dance (Official Charts)	2
US Dance Airplay (Billboard)	4
US Dance Club Songs (Billboard)	22

=== Year-end charts ===
Chart (2011)	Position
Australia (ARIA)	38
Australia Dance (ARIA)	9
Belgium (Ultratop 50 Flanders)	54
UK Singles (OCC)	35
US Dance/Mix Show Airplay (Billboard)	27

== Certifications ==
Region	Certification	Certified units/sales
Australia (ARIA)	4× Platinum	280,000^{‡}
Canada (Music Canada)	Gold	40,000^{‡}
Denmark (IFPI Danmark)	Gold	15,000^{^}
New Zealand (RMNZ)	Gold	7,500^{*}
Sweden (GLF)	Platinum	40,000^{‡}
United Kingdom (BPI)	Platinum	600,000^{‡}
Streaming
Denmark (IFPI Danmark)	Gold	50,000^{†}
^{*} Sales figures based on certification alone.^{^} Shipments figures based on certification alone.^{‡} Sales+streaming figures based on certification alone.^{†} Streaming-only figures based on certification alone.

== Release history ==
Region	Date	Format	Label
Australia	10 June 2011	Digital download	Sony
Ireland	10 June 2011	Digital download	Sony
United Kingdom	12 June 2011	Digital download	Sony
United Kingdom	13 June 2011	CD single	Sony
Germany	17 June 2011	Digital download	Sony
