= Ayah Marar =

Jordanian musical artist (born 1980)

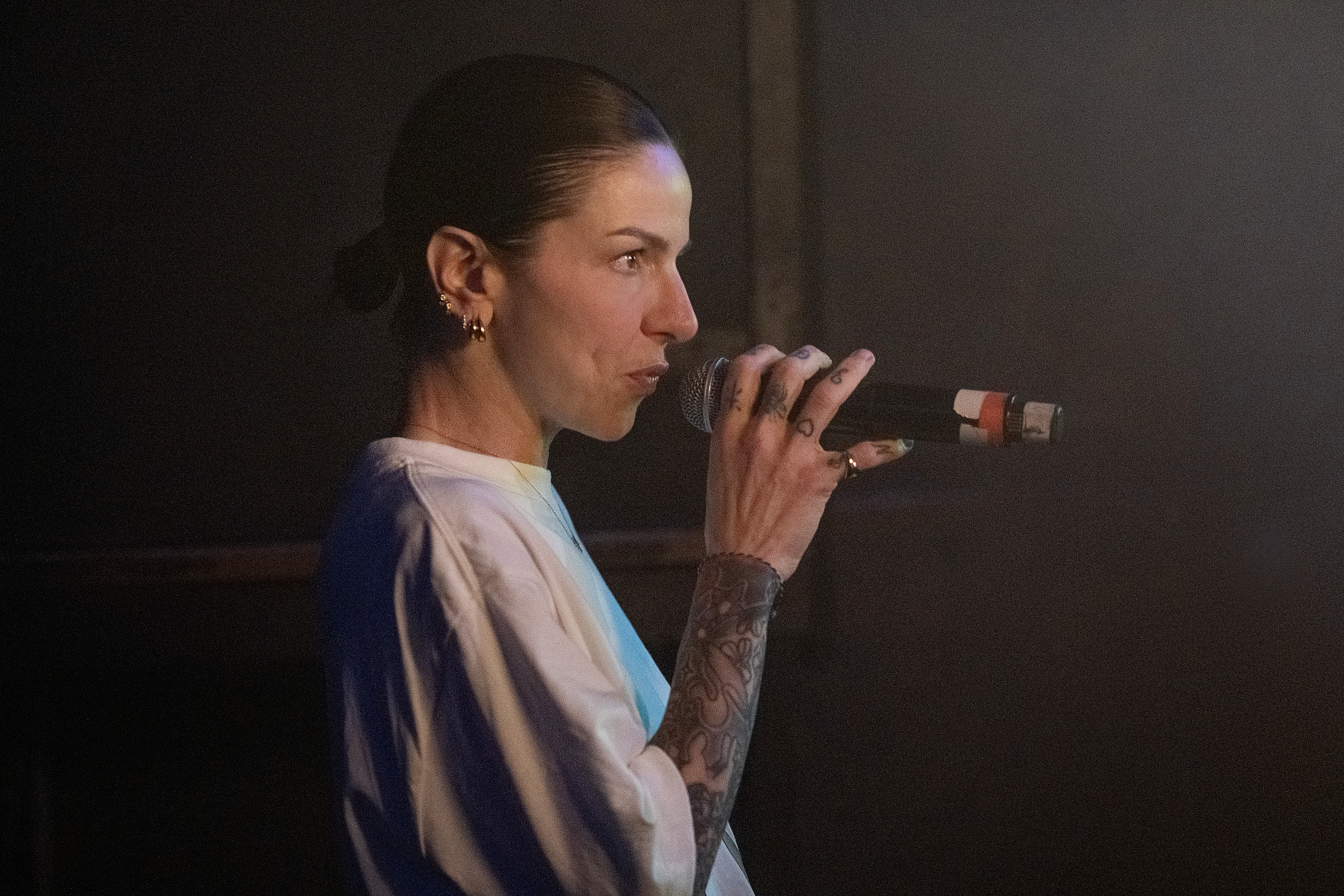
- Ayah Marar at SXSW London 2026

Background information
- Born: 20 September 1980 (age 45); Amman, Jordan
- Genres: Drum and bass; pop; dance; R&B
- Occupations: Singer; songwriter; musician
- Instruments: Vocals
- Years active: 2004–present
- Labels: Hussle Girl; Transmission Recordings; Hospital; Signal Records; Sony
- Website: ayahmarar.com

Ayah Marar (Arabic: آية مرار; born 20 September 1980) is a Jordanian/Bulgarian singer and songwriter based in the UK. She has been featured as a vocalist or writer on music from British artists including Calvin Harris, DJ Fresh, Camo & Krooked, Bassline Smith and Jack Peñate. She has been referred to as the "Queen of Bass" and the "dubstep queen".

== Early life ==
Ayah was born in Amman, Jordan, to a Jordanian father and a Czech-Bulgarian mother. She spent most of her adolescence in Jordan, before emigrating to the UK at 18 years of age, where she began her musical career at Warwick University.

== Musical career ==
Marar is involved in the drum and bass scene and recorded her first single, 'Dance Child', with Loxy & Ink (Signal Records). She recorded several singles in this genre, before meeting and collaborating with Calvin Harris and Toddla T in 2004. Marar and Harris shared a home for a brief period, she toured the world as part of his live show and she collaborated on his second album, performing the vocals on 3 of the tracks, as well as a guest spot on Toddla's album and a single with his previous band Small Arms Fiya.

Ayah worked at a record shop, Uptown Records, in Soho where she met and formed bonds with several radio and club personalities. In the meantime she helped to establish and run Lucky Devil Records and promoted events in and around London.

She wrote and recorded on albums by Jack Penate, Bassline Smith, Calvin Harris (forthcoming and previous LP) and DJ Fresh.

Marar receives support from BBC Radio 1, Kiss FM, Ministry of Sound radio and BBC Radio 1Xtra, appearing on the latter several times for shows and PAs, and with support from the likes of MistaJam and Bailey. She has guest-hosted radio shows. Her recent single 'Unstoppable' was Jam Hot Record of the Week.

Ayah launched her solo career and created her own independent label, "Hussle Girl", as a platform to release her own singles and forthcoming album, "The Real". Her album The Real was released on 15 October 2012 via Hussle Girl and Transmission Recordings in the UK and Radikal Records in the US and Canada.

She held a residency as a DJ at Herbal in Shoreditch for four years and worked as a touring MC with Hospital Records and other companies. She formed a funk band, SlinkyFix, toured the UK and performed at events with Gilles Peterson and at the Jazz Café.

With the Austrian drum and bass duo, Camo & Krooked, she performed at Brixton Academy and throughout Europe. Ayah was as of 2012 touring her solo material with DJ Tenku.

Marar again collaborated with Calvin Harris on his 2013 single "Thinking About You".

== Discography ==
=== Albums ===
- The Real (Hussle Girl / Transmission Recordings 2012)

=== Singles and EPs ===
- "Mind Controller" (Hussle Girl 2012)
- "Unstoppable" (Hussle Girl / Transmission Recordings 2012)
- "The Raver" (Pilot Recordings 2012)
- "Alive" (featuring P Money) (produced by FuntCase) (Hussle Girl / Transmission Recordings 2013)
- The Bass Soldiers EP (Hussle Girl 2014)
- "Mind Controller (Tom Bull Remix)" (Hed Kandi Records / Ministry of Sound 2016)

=== As featured artist ===
Charting

Year	Title	Peak chart positions										Certifications	Album
Year	Title	UK	AUS	BEL (FL)	CAN	FRA	GER	IRE	NL	NZ	US	Certifications	Album
2013	"Thinking About You" (Calvin Harris featuring Ayah Marar)	8	28	27	58	92	56	11	23	40	86	BPI: Platinum; RMNZ: Gold	18 Months

Others

- DJ Fresh feat. Ayah Marar 'The Edge' - 'The Feeling' (Additional Vocals) - 'Turn It Up' (Writing Credit)
- Architex feat. Ayah Marar ‘Dance Child’ Signal Recs
- Noisia - 'Into Dust'
- Calvin Harris feat. Ayah Marar ‘Let Me Know’
- Insiders feat. Ayah Marar ‘Meltdown’ Metalheadz
- Domu feat. Ayah Marar ‘Something New’ TrebleO
- Apex feat. Ayah Marar ‘The Space Between’ Hospital
- Bungle feat. Ayah Marar ‘If I Leave’ CIA
- Baron feat. Ayah Marar 'Endless Summer' Breakbeat Kaos
- Total Science & Bungle feat. Ayah Marar ‘Snake Eyes’ CIA
- Marky & Total Science feat. Ayah Marar ‘2nd Date’ CINNA
- Small Arms Fiya feat. Ayah Marar ‘Pressure/Gotta Decide’ MoreAboutMusic
- Camo & Krooked feat. Ayah Marar 'Cross The Line' Hospital Recs
- Camo & Krooked feat. Ayah Marar 'Watch It Burn' Hospital Recs
- Warrior One feat. Ayah Marar 'FYAH' Black Butter Recs
- Yogi feat. Ayah Marar 'Follow U' Ministry Of Sound
- Bungle feat Ayah Marar 'The Siren' Spearhead
- Calvin Harris 'Flashback' - 'Stars Come Out' - 'Limits'
- Jack Penate 'Tonight's Today' - 'Everything Is New' - 'Be The One' - 'Pull My Heart Away' - 'Every Glance'
- Toddla T 'Helders'
- Drumsound & Bassline Smith 'The Only Way' & 'The Flames'
- Russo feat. Ayah Marar - 'I Know'
- Cheryl Cole 'Call My Name' (additional vocals)
- Dilemn feat. Ayah Marar - 'Talk About Us'
- R3hab & NERVO feat. Ayah Marar - 'Ready for the Weekend'
- Calyx & TeeBee feat. Ayah Marar - 'The Fall'
- The Prototypes feat. Ayah Marar - 'Kill The Silence'
- Opticks & Ayah Marar - 'Don't Go'
- Blue Marble ft. Ayah Marar - 'Invincible'
- Teddy Killerz ft. Ayah Marar - 'Ready'
- Sintra ft. Ayah Marar - 'Never Give Up'
- Six Blade & AMC ft. Ayah Marar - 'Hardest To Love'
- Paul Harris ft. Ayah Marar - 'Oxygen'
- Designated ft. Ayah Marar - 'Begging For You'
- Caroline D'Amore ft. Ayah Marar - 'Love Somebody'
- LA Riots & Ayah Marar - 'Stay With Me'
- Caspa ft. Ayah Marar - 'One By One'
- Tragedy Kaddafi - ‘I Cried’
- Bondax ft. Ayah Marar - 'Dusk Funk'
- Kastle ft. Ayah Marar - 'Red Light'
- Otto Orlandi & The Chorz feat. Ayah Marar - 'Oddest Goddess'
- Andromedik ft. Ayah Marar - 'First To Go'
- Andromedik ft. Ayah Marar - 'Tomorrow'

== Videography ==
=== 2011 ===
- Yogi feat Ayah Marar 'Follow U' (directed by Blake Caridge)
- Camo & Krooked feat Ayah Marar 'Cross The Line' (directed by Isaac & Ali @ Yo Video Films)

=== 2012 ===
- Ayah Marar 'Mind Controller' (directed by Dani Deville)
- Ayah Marar 'Unstoppable' (directed by Dani Deville)
- Russo feat Ayah Marar 'I Know' (directed by B.E.L.A)
- Ayah Marar 'The Raver' (directed by Halcyon Nights)

=== 2013 ===
- Ayah Marar feat P Money 'Alive' (directed by Luke Biggins)
- Ayah Marar ' Lethal Dose'
- Calvin Harris feat Ayah Marar 'Thinking About You'
- Ayah Marar 'Beg Borrow Steal' (directed by Daniel Deville)
