= Feel So Close =

2011 single by Calvin Harris

Single by Calvin Harris

from the album 18 Months
- Written: 2009
- Released: 19 August 2011
- Recorded: Autumn 2010
- Genre: Electro house; dance-pop
- Length: 3:27
- Label: Deconstruction; Fly Eye; Columbia; Ultra
- Songwriter: Calvin Harris
- Producer: Calvin Harris

Calvin Harris singles chronology
| "Bounce" (2011) | "Feel So Close" (2011) | "We Found Love" (2011) |

Music video
- "Feel So Close" on YouTube

"Feel So Close" is a song by Scottish DJ Calvin Harris, released as the second single from his third studio album, 18 Months (2012). In order to have lyrics and be standalone, Harris had to return to singing on this song, after previously stating he had stopped singing in concerts. The song debuted at number two on the UK Singles Chart, becoming Harris's sixth solo top ten single. It also marked his second single to chart on the Billboard Hot 100 in the United States—his first being Rihanna's "We Found Love", on which he is featured. The song had sold over 2.17 million copies in the US by the end of 2012.

== Background ==
Harris shared the story behind "Feel So Close" on 19 August 2021, the tenth anniversary of the song's release.

"I like remembering how it came about, cos at the time I was well confused about what to do with my life/career. At the end of summer 2010 I had played my last gig (Creamfields) with my 'band' and had done enough 'DJ set' gigs to know that I wanted to change the way my music was presented. I needed to stop singing every song as I had all these ideas for female singers and my falsetto just wasn't going to cut it.

So I began producing with a new purpose, excited I could give my songs to real singers and finally move closer to the role I had always dreamt of in music (weird dude in the background who never speaks).

After about 3 months of studio, I visited my record label Columbia and played them Awooga, Bounce and another ok song with a feature that ended up not coming out. The response from the label was overwhelmingly lukewarm; I came out of the meeting wondering if I had made the right decision in changing my path. That's putting it lightly actually I was gutted and my head was spinning, I thought I'd absolutely fucked it. So immediately I headed back to my studio room feeling properly sad but also enough 'fuck it I'll show em I'll sing on one then, and it'll be class' and made Feel So Close in a few hours."

== Critical reception ==
Robert Copsey of Digital Spy gave the song four out of five stars writing: "'I feel so close to you right now/ It's a force field', he sing-speaks in a clumsy but infatuated manner over melancholic piano chords, before a breezy, lyric-less chorus of squawking electronic sirens and crazy synths bound around like a bucking bronco at a Texas rodeo rave. The result is a wistful yet exhilarating club thumper—and as for those vocals, well, if you want something done right..."

== Music video ==
The music video for "Feel So Close", directed by Vincent Haycock, premiered on Harris's official YouTube channel on 14 July 2011. As well as depicting Harris watching and sitting with a girl, it also shows various groups of youths dancing, as was the theme of the previous video. It also features the rancher cowboy and his horse, who are featured on the single cover. It was filmed in and around Kern County, California. The truck stop scene was filmed at Astro Burgers, Boron adjacent to Reyes Polish—now Reyes Truck Polishing—in Kramer Junction in San Bernardino County, California; the suburban scene at the intersection of Clark and Lapis Streets, in Rosamond, California; the desert town scene in Randsburg, California.

== In popular culture ==
One of the first uses of the song was as the music for Team iLuminate's routine on the America's Got Talent finals show of season 6 on 13 September 2011.

"Feel So Close" was featured on the CW series The Secret Circle in the 14th episode of the first season and on The Vampire Diaries in the fourth episode of the fourth season. It was also used in the video game Guitar Hero Live and the trailer to the film Parental Guidance. The song was used for montages on episodes of RTÉ's League of Ireland highlight show Monday Night Soccer in the 2012 season.

In 2013, YouTube star Kurt Hugo Schneider and Coca-Cola teamed up to create music videos featuring creative covers of two 2011 hits namely "Feel So Close" and Of Monsters and Men's "Little Talks" for a campaign called "The Sounds of AHH". "Feel So Close" shows Schneider playing only Coca-Cola bottles, glasses and cans. In this version, he is accompanied by beatboxing cellist Kevin Olusola. Commercial edits of the video aired on the season 13 premiere of American Idol on 14 January 2014 on FOX.

In 2024, the song was used in the series finale of The Talk. In 2025, the song was added to the video game Just Dance 2025 Edition as part of the Just Dance+ subscription service.

The instrumental version of this song is also featured in a commercial for the Samsung Galaxy S5 smartphone, and the soundtrack to The Inbetweeners Movie.

=== Never StreSS ===
On January 14, 2026, TikTok user @biago.07 posted a video featuring various clips of American YouTuber Logan Paul, followed by numerous AI-generated videos of Paul wearing an SS uniform, set to a slowed-down version of the song. The post garnered over 1.4 million views, 176,800 likes, and 1,450 comments in three weeks; the meme was dubbed "Never StreSS," as the capitalized "SS" alludes to the acronym of the German paramilitary organization Schutzstaffel.

== Track listings ==
Digital download – EP
| No. | Title | Length |
|---|---|---|
| 1. | "Feel So Close" (Radio Edit) | 3:27 |
| 2. | "Feel So Close" (Extended Mix) | 5:30 |
| 3. | "Feel So Close" (Nero Remix) | 4:44 |
| 4. | "Feel So Close" (Benny Benassi Remix) | 5:20 |
| 5. | "Feel So Close" (Dillon Francis Remix) | 5:13 |
| 6. | "Feel So Close" (Nero Dub) | 4:44 |
| 7. | "Feel So Close" (Instrumental) | 3:29 |

12" picture disc
| No. | Title | Length |
|---|---|---|
| 1. | "A1. Feel So Close" (Extended Mix) | 5:30 |
| 2. | "A2. Feel So Close" (Benny Benassi Remix) | 5:22 |
| 3. | "B1. Feel So Close" (Nero Remix) | 4:47 |
| 4. | "B2. Feel So Close" (Dillon Francis Remix) | 5:14 |

== Charts ==
=== Weekly charts ===
| Chart (2011–2012) | Peak position |
|---|---|
| Australia (ARIA) | 7 |
| Australia Dance (ARIA) | 7 |
| Belgium (Ultratop 50 Flanders) | 25 |
| Belgium (Ultratip Bubbling Under Wallonia) | 3 |
| Brazil (Billboard Hot 100 Airplay) | 25 |
| Brazil (Billboard Hot Pop Songs) | 6 |
| Canada Hot 100 (Billboard) | 9 |
| Canada Hot AC (Billboard) | 24 |
| Canada CHR/Top 40 (Billboard) | 7 |
| Czech Republic Airplay (ČNS IFPI) | 47 |
| Czech Republic Singles Digital (ČNS IFPI) | 47 |
| Euro Digital Song Sales (Billboard) | 3 |
| France (SNEP) | 11 |
| Hungary (Rádiós Top 40) | 12 |
| Ireland (IRMA) | 2 |
| Netherlands (Dutch Top 40) | 15 |
| Netherlands (Single Top 100) | 32 |
| New Zealand (Recorded Music NZ) | 5 |
| Portugal Digital Song Sales (Billboard) | 6 |
| Romania (Romanian Top 100) | 31 |
| Scottish Singles Sales (Official Charts) | 1 |
| Slovakia Airplay (ČNS IFPI) | 91 |
| Slovakia Singles Digital (ČNS IFPI) | 84 |
| Spain (Promusicae) | 11 |
| Switzerland (Schweizer Hitparade) | 57 |
| Ukraine Airplay (TopHit) | 68 |
| UK Singles (Official Charts) | 2 |
| UK Dance (Official Charts) | 1 |
| US Billboard Hot 100 | 12 |
| US Adult Pop Airplay (Billboard) | 28 |
| US Dance Club Songs (Billboard) | 33 |
| US Dance Airplay (Billboard) | 1 |
| US Hot Latin Songs (Billboard) | 26 |
| US Pop Airplay (Billboard) | 8 |
| US Rhythmic Airplay (Billboard) | 19 |

2026 weekly chart performance for "Feel So Close"
| Chart (2026) | Peak position |
|---|---|
| Latvia Streaming (LaIPA) | 17 |

=== Year-end charts ===
| Chart (2011) | Position |
|---|---|
| Australia (ARIA) | 43 |
| Australia Dance (ARIA) | 12 |
| Netherlands (Dutch Top 40) | 99 |
| New Zealand (Recorded Music NZ) | 41 |
| UK Singles (Official Charts Company) | 46 |

| Chart (2012) | Position |
|---|---|
| Australia Dance (ARIA) | 22 |
| Canada (Canadian Hot 100) | 24 |
| France (SNEP) | 134 |
| Hungary (Rádiós Top 40) | 65 |
| Netherlands (Dutch Top 40) | 84 |
| US Billboard Hot 100 | 42 |
| US Dance/Mix Show Airplay (Billboard) | 1 |
| US Mainstream Top 40 (Billboard) | 40 |

| Chart (2013) | Position |
|---|---|
| Brazil (Crowley) | 85 |
| France (SNEP) | 42 |

| Chart (2024) | Position |
|---|---|
| Australia Dance (ARIA) | 14 |

== Certifications ==
| Region | Certification | Certified units/sales |
|---|---|---|
| Australia (ARIA) | 9× Platinum | 630,000^{‡} |
| Brazil (Pro-Música Brasil) | Diamond | 250,000^{‡} |
| Canada (Music Canada) | 8× Platinum | 640,000^{‡} |
| Germany (BVMI) | Gold | 150,000^{‡} |
| Italy (FIMI) | Platinum | 50,000^{‡} |
| New Zealand (RMNZ) | 6× Platinum | 180,000^{‡} |
| Norway (IFPI Norway) | Gold | 5,000^{*} |
| Portugal (AFP) | Gold | 10,000^{‡} |
| Spain (Promusicae) | Platinum | 60,000^{‡} |
| Sweden (GLF) | Platinum | 40,000^{‡} |
| Switzerland (IFPI Switzerland) | Gold | 15,000^{^} |
| United Kingdom (BPI) | 3× Platinum | 1,800,000^{‡} |
| United States (RIAA) | 3× Platinum | 3,000,000^{‡} |
Streaming
| Denmark (IFPI Danmark) | Platinum | 1,800,000^{†} |
^{*} Sales figures based on certification alone.^{^} Shipments figures based on certification alone.^{‡} Sales+streaming figures based on certification alone.^{†} Streaming-only figures based on certification alone.

== Release history ==
| Region | Date | Format | Label |
|---|---|---|---|
| Ireland | 19 August 2011 | Digital download | Deconstruction; Fly Eye; Columbia |
| United Kingdom | 21 August 2011 | Digital download | Deconstruction; Fly Eye; Columbia |
| United States | 14 February 2012 | Mainstream radio | Ultra |
