= Calvin Harris discography =

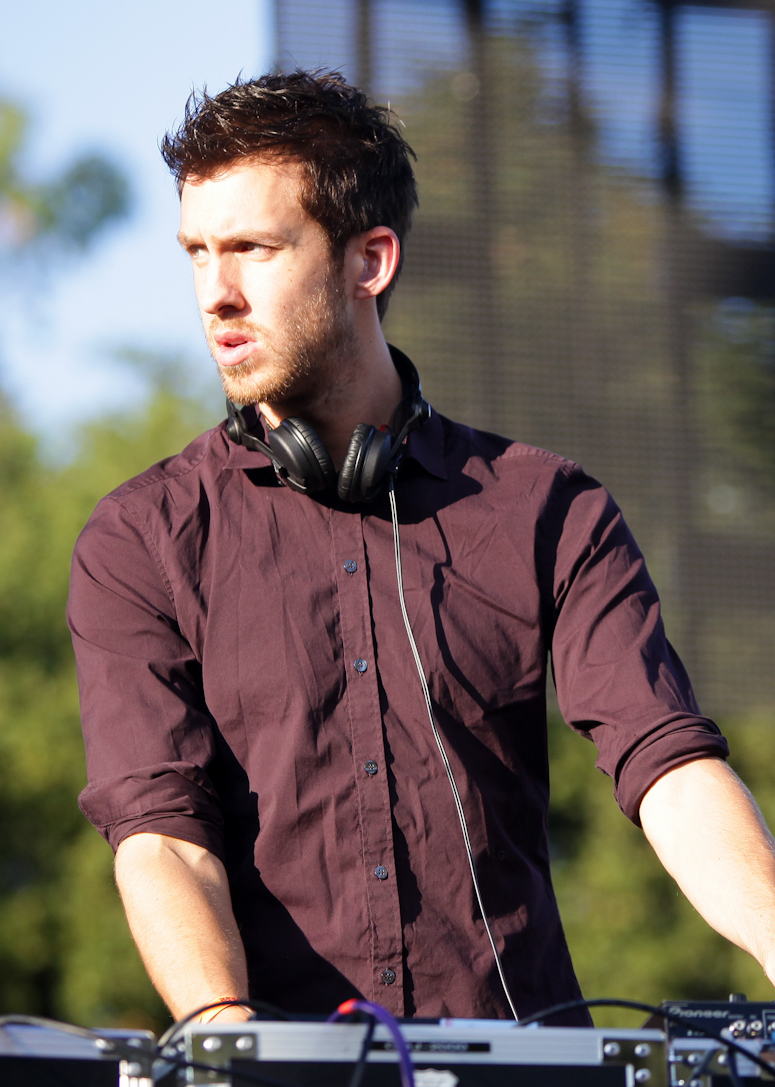
- Harris performing in 2011
- Studio albums: 7
- Extended plays: 9
- Singles: 62
- Music videos: 48
- Promotional singles: 12
- Mix albums: 1

Scottish DJ Calvin Harris has released seven studio albums, one mix album, nine extended plays, 62 singles (including four as a featured artist), 12 promotional singles and 48 music videos. As of November 2014, Harris had sold 8,176,180 singles and tracks in the United Kingdom. Harris's debut studio album, I Created Disco, was released in June 2007. The album peaked at number eight on the UK Albums Chart and was certified gold by the British Phonographic Industry (BPI). Its first two singles, "Acceptable in the 80s" and "The Girls", peaked at numbers 10 and three, respectively, on the UK Singles Chart, while the third single, "Merrymaking at My Place", reached number 43.

In August 2009, Harris released his second studio album, Ready for the Weekend, which debuted at number one on the UK Albums Chart and earned a gold certification from the BPI within two months of release. Its lead single, "I'm Not Alone", became Harris's first number one on the UK Singles Chart as a lead artist. "Ready for the Weekend" was released as the album's second single, peaking at number three in the United Kingdom. Two more singles were released from the album, "Flashback" and "You Used to Hold Me", which reached numbers 18 and 27 on the UK chart, respectively.

His third studio album, 18 Months, was released in October 2012. The album sees Harris stepping away from vocals, instead focusing on the music production. It earned Harris his second consecutive number-one album in his home country. 18 Months also became his first album to chart on the Billboard 200 in the United States, peaking at number 19, while reaching number two in Ireland, number five in Australia and number eight in Canada. The album's lead single, "Bounce" featuring Kelis, peaked at number two on the UK Singles Chart and gave Harris his first top-10 entry in Australia, peaking at number seven. The second single, "Feel So Close", also peaked at number two in the UK. The song brought Harris to international prominence, reaching number five in New Zealand and number seven in Australia, as well as becoming his first chart entry as a lead performer on the US Billboard Hot 100, where it charted at number 12.

In 2011, Harris wrote, produced and was featured on Rihanna's single "We Found Love", which topped the charts in 25 countries, including the United Kingdom, the United States, Ireland and Canada. The third and fourth singles from 18 Months, "Let's Go" (featuring Ne-Yo) and "We'll Be Coming Back" (featuring Example), both reached number two on the UK chart, with the former also peaking at number 17 on the Billboard Hot 100. The album's fifth single, "Sweet Nothing" featuring Florence Welch, became Harris's fourth number-one single in the UK and first top-10 single in the US. "Drinking from the Bottle" (featuring Tinie Tempah) and "I Need Your Love" (featuring Ellie Goulding) served as the album's sixth and seventh singles. Having both charted inside the UK top 10 by April 2013, Harris made chart history by becoming the first artist to attain eight top-10 singles from one studio album, overtaking the record previously set by Michael Jackson. The eighth and final single, "Thinking About You" featuring Ayah Marar, peaked at number eight on the UK Singles Chart.

Harris's fourth studio album, Motion, was released in October 2014. It peaked at number two on the UK Albums Chart and number five on the US Billboard 200, his highest-peaking album on the latter chart. The album includes the UK number-one singles "Under Control", "Summer" and "Blame", as well as the top-10 single "Outside". In July 2015, Harris released the Disciples-assisted single "How Deep Is Your Love". Throughout 2016, he released a string of singles—"This Is What You Came For", "Hype" and "My Way", all becoming commercially successful.

Harris released his fifth studio album, Funk Wav Bounces Vol. 1, in June 2017. The album was preceded by the singles "Slide", "Heatstroke", "Rollin" and "Feels". His sixth studio album, Funk Wav Bounces Vol. 2, followed in August 2022. The album was supported by "Potion", "New Money" and "Stay with Me". Harris's seventh studio and first compilation album, 96 Months, was surprise released in August 2024, which included most non-album singles released from July 2015 to "Free" in July 2024. The album also featured songs released under Harris's side project Love Regenerator.

== Albums ==
=== Studio albums ===
List of studio albums, with selected chart positions, sales figures and certifications
Title	Details	Peak chart positions										Sales	Certifications
Title	Details	UK	AUS	BEL (FL)	CAN	FRA	GER	IRE	NLD	NZ	US	Sales	Certifications
I Created Disco	Released: 15 June 2007; Label: Fly Eye, Columbia; Formats: CD, LP, digital download	8	—	—	—	95	—	34	—	—	—	UK: 223,845	BPI: Gold
Ready for the Weekend	Released: 14 August 2009; Label: Fly Eye, Columbia; Formats: CD, LP, digital download	1	39	—	—	139	—	6	—	—	—	UK: 274,786	BPI: Platinum; ARIA: Gold; RMNZ: Platinum
18 Months	Released: 26 October 2012; Label: Deconstruction, Fly Eye, Columbia; Formats: CD, LP, digital download	1	5	50	8	110	63	2	48	4	19	UK: 923,861	BPI: 4× Platinum; ARIA: 2× Platinum; BVMI: Gold; IRMA: Gold; MC: 2× Platinum; RIAA: Platinum; RMNZ: 3× Platinum
Motion	Released: 31 October 2014; Label: Fly Eye, Columbia; Formats: CD, LP, digital download	2	3	20	2	20	20	5	25	4	5	US: 66,000	BPI: Platinum; ARIA: Platinum; BVMI: Gold; MC: 2× Platinum; RIAA: Platinum; RMNZ: 2× Platinum
Funk Wav Bounces Vol. 1	Released: 30 June 2017; Label: Columbia; Formats: CD, LP, digital download	2	5	14	1	21	29	2	5	3	2	US: 23,000	BPI: Gold; ARIA: Gold; MC: 2× Platinum; RIAA: Platinum; RMNZ: 3× Platinum
Funk Wav Bounces Vol. 2	Released: 5 August 2022; Label: Columbia; Formats: CD, LP, digital download	5	30	112	9	45	—	23	28	18	17		
96 Months	Released: 9 August 2024; Label: Columbia; Formats: CD, LP, digital download	11	30	69	56	31	—	6	89	16	—		BPI: Platinum; RMNZ: Platinum; SNEP: Gold
"—" denotes a recording that did not chart in that territory

=== Mix albums ===
- L.E.D. Festival Presents Calvin Harris (2010)

== Extended plays ==
- Napster Live Session (2007)
- iTunes Live: Berlin Festival (2008)
- iTunes Live: London Festival '09 (2009)
- Normani x Calvin Harris (2018, with Normani)
- I'm Not Alone 2019 (2019)
- Love Regenerator 1 (2020, as Love Regenerator)
- Love Regenerator 2 (2020, as Love Regenerator)
- Love Regenerator 3 (2020, as Love Regenerator)
- Moving (2020, as Love Regenerator, with Eli Brown)
- Rollercoaster (2021, as Love Regenerator, with Solardo)

== Singles ==
=== As lead artist ===
List of singles as lead artist, with selected chart positions and certifications, showing year released and album name
Title	Year	Peak chart positions										Certifications	Album
Title	Year	UK	AUS	BEL (FL)	CAN	FRA	GER	IRE	NLD	NZ	US	Certifications	Album
"Acceptable in the 80s"	2007	10	97	—	—	—	30	30	—	—	—	BPI: Platinum; ARIA: 2× Platinum	I Created Disco
"The Girls"	2007	3	33	—	—	—	—	23	—	—	—	BPI: Silver; ARIA: Gold	I Created Disco
"Merrymaking at My Place"	2007	43	—	—	—	—	—	—	—	—	—		I Created Disco
"I'm Not Alone"	2009	1	48	13	—	—	—	4	— (Note: "I'm Not Alone" did not enter the Dutch Top 40, but peaked at number five on the Dutch Tipparade chart.)	40	—	BPI: Platinum; ARIA: 2× Platinum; RMNZ: Platinum	Ready for the Weekend
"Ready for the Weekend"	2009	3	—	— (Note: "Ready for the Weekend" did not enter the Ultratop 50, but peaked at number two on the Flemish Ultratip chart.)	—	—	—	9	— (Note: "Ready for the Weekend" did not enter the Dutch Top 40, but peaked at number 10 on the Dutch Tipparade chart.)	—	—	BPI: Gold; ARIA: Gold	Ready for the Weekend
"Flashback"	2009	18	38	— (Note: "Flashback" did not enter the Ultratop 50, but peaked at number 10 on the Flemish Ultratip chart.)	—	—	—	23	—	—	—	BPI: Silver; ARIA: Platinum	Ready for the Weekend
"You Used to Hold Me"	2010	27	57	—	—	—	—	30	—	—	—	BPI: Silver; ARIA: Platinum	Ready for the Weekend
"Bounce" (featuring Kelis)	2011	2	7	7	—	—	—	6	28	6	—	BPI: Platinum; ARIA: 4× Platinum; MC: Gold; RMNZ: Gold	18 Months
"Feel So Close"	2011	2	7	25	9	11	—	2	15	5	12	BPI: 3× Platinum; ARIA: 9× Platinum; BVMI: Gold; MC: 8× Platinum; RIAA: 3× Platinum; RMNZ: 6× Platinum	18 Months
"Let's Go" (featuring Ne-Yo)	2012	2	17	31	19	117	59	6	27	14	17	BPI: Platinum; ARIA: 2× Platinum; MC: Platinum; RIAA: Gold; RMNZ: Platinum	18 Months
"We'll Be Coming Back" (featuring Example)	2012	2	8	— (Note: "We'll Be Coming Back" did not enter the Ultratop 50, but peaked at number four on the Flemish Ultratip chart.)	—	—	—	1	30	16	—	BPI: Platinum; ARIA: 3× Platinum; MC: Gold; RMNZ: Platinum	18 Months
"Sweet Nothing" (featuring Florence Welch)	2012	1	2	9	15	17	19	1	22	2	10	BPI: 2× Platinum; ARIA: 6× Platinum; BRMA: Gold; BVMI: Platinum; MC: 5× Platinum; RIAA: 3× Platinum; RMNZ: 3× Platinum	18 Months
"Drinking from the Bottle" (featuring Tinie Tempah)	2013	5	16	34	—	62	—	9	— (Note: "Drinking from the Bottle" did not enter the Dutch Top 40, but peaked at number four on the Dutch Tipparade chart.)	34	—	BPI: Platinum; ARIA: 2× Platinum; RMNZ: Gold	18 Months
"I Need Your Love" (featuring Ellie Goulding)	2013	4	3	8	13	10	13	6	29	15	16	BPI: 2× Platinum; ARIA: 5× Platinum; BRMA: Gold; BVMI: Platinum; MC: 4× Platinum; RIAA: 3× Platinum; RMNZ: 2× Platinum	18 Months
"Thinking About You" (featuring Ayah Marar)	2013	8	28	20	58	92	56	11	21	40	86	BPI: Platinum; ARIA: 2× Platinum; MC: Platinum; RIAA: Platinum; RMNZ: Platinum	18 Months
"Under Control" (with Alesso featuring Hurts)	2013	1	17	42	82	55	24	5	— (Note: "Under Control" did not enter the Dutch Top 40, but peaked at number two on the Dutch Tipparade chart.)	31	— (Note: "Under Control" did not enter the Billboard Hot 100, but peaked at number three on the Bubbling Under Hot 100 Singles chart.)	BPI: Platinum; ARIA: 2× Platinum; BVMI: Gold; MC: Platinum; RIAA: Platinum; RMNZ: Platinum	Motion
"Summer"	2014	1	4	5	3	15	3	1	1	19	7	BPI: 4× Platinum; ARIA: 7× Platinum; BRMA: Gold; BVMI: 3× Gold; MC: 8× Platinum; RIAA: 6× Platinum; RMNZ: 5× Platinum	Motion
"Blame" (featuring John Newman)	2014	1	9	7	11	7	4	5	1	9	19	BPI: 3× Platinum; ARIA: 4× Platinum; BVMI: Platinum; MC: 4× Platinum; RIAA: 3× Platinum; RMNZ: 3× Platinum	Motion
"Outside" (featuring Ellie Goulding)	2014	6	7	8	10	19	1	5	7	7	29	BPI: 3× Platinum; ARIA: 5× Platinum; BVMI: 3× Gold; MC: 4× Platinum; RIAA: 3× Platinum; RMNZ: 4× Platinum	Motion
"Open Wide" (featuring Big Sean)	2015	23	77	— (Note: "Open Wide" did not enter the Ultratop 50, but peaked at number eight on the Flemish Ultratip chart.)	—	37	22	63	—	—	— (Note: "Open Wide" did not enter the Billboard Hot 100, but peaked at number 15 on the Bubbling Under Hot 100 Singles chart.)	ARIA: Gold; MC: Platinum; RIAA: Gold	Motion
"Pray to God" (featuring Haim)	2015	35	10	— (Note: "Pray to God" did not enter the Ultratop 50, but peaked at number two on the Flemish Ultratip chart.)	68	59	23	21	25	39	— (Note: "Pray to God" did not enter the Billboard Hot 100, but peaked at number six on the Bubbling Under Hot 100 Singles chart.)	BPI: Gold; ARIA: 2× Platinum; BVMI: Gold; MC: Gold; RIAA: Gold; RMNZ: Gold	Motion
"How Deep Is Your Love" (with Disciples)	2015	2	1	1	16	2	4	2	1	2	27	BPI: 4× Platinum; ARIA: 8× Platinum; BRMA: Platinum; BVMI: 3× Gold; MC: Platinum; RIAA: 4× Platinum; RMNZ: 5× Platinum	96 Months
"This Is What You Came For" (with Rihanna)	2016	2	1	4	1	5	5	1	3	2	3	BPI: 5× Platinum; ARIA: 12× Platinum; BRMA: 2× Platinum; BVMI: 3× Gold; MC: 4× Platinum; RIAA: 8× Platinum; RMNZ: 7× Platinum; SNEP: Diamond	96 Months
"Hype" (with Dizzee Rascal)	2016	34	—	—	—	—	—	71	—	— (Note: "Hype" did not enter the New Zealand Singles Chart, but peaked at number two on the New Zealand Heatseeker Singles Chart.)	—	BPI: Silver; RMNZ: Gold	Non-album single
"My Way"	2016	4	9	5	14	4	5	4	4	10	24	BPI: 2× Platinum; ARIA: 5× Platinum; BRMA: Platinum; BVMI: 3× Gold; MC: Platinum; RIAA: 2× Platinum; RMNZ: 4× Platinum; SNEP: Diamond	96 Months
"Slide" (featuring Frank Ocean and Migos)	2017	10	11	10	16	15	25	12	10	8	25	BPI: 2× Platinum; ARIA: 6× Platinum; BRMA: Platinum; BVMI: Gold; MC: 7× Platinum; RIAA: 5× Platinum; RMNZ: 6× Platinum; SNEP: Diamond	Funk Wav Bounces Vol. 1
"Heatstroke" (featuring Young Thug, Pharrell Williams and Ariana Grande)	2017	25	23	—	53	23	85	33	—	— (Note: "Heatstroke" did not enter the New Zealand Singles Chart, but peaked at number one on the New Zealand Heatseeker Singles Chart.)	96	BPI: Silver; ARIA: Platinum; MC: Gold; RIAA: Gold; RMNZ: Platinum	Funk Wav Bounces Vol. 1
"Rollin" (featuring Future and Khalid)	2017	43	40	—	36	38	94	38	—	34	62	BPI: Silver; ARIA: Platinum; MC: 3× Platinum; RIAA: 2× Platinum; RMNZ: 2× Platinum	Funk Wav Bounces Vol. 1
"Feels" (featuring Pharrell Williams, Katy Perry and Big Sean)	2017	1	3	3	5	1	9	3	7	2	20	BPI: 3× Platinum; ARIA: 6× Platinum; BRMA: Platinum; BVMI: Platinum; MC: 6× Platinum; RIAA: 3× Platinum; RMNZ: 5× Platinum; SNEP: Diamond	Funk Wav Bounces Vol. 1
"Faking It" (featuring Kehlani and Lil Yachty)	2017	97	—	— (Note: "Faking It" did not enter the Ultratop 50, but peaked at number 23 on the Flemish Ultratip chart.)	99	—	—	—	—	— (Note: "Faking It" did not enter the New Zealand Singles Chart, but peaked at number 10 on the New Zealand Heatseeker Singles Chart.)	94	BPI: Silver; ARIA: Gold; MC: Gold; RIAA: Platinum; RMNZ: Platinum	Funk Wav Bounces Vol. 1
"The Weekend (Funk Wav Remix)" (with SZA)	2017	—	—	—	—	—	—	—	—	— (Note: "The Weekend" did not enter the New Zealand Singles Chart, but peaked at number three on the New Zealand Heatseeker Singles Chart.)	—	RIAA: Platinum; RMNZ: Gold	Non-album single
"Nuh Ready Nuh Ready" (featuring PartyNextDoor)	2018	48	—	— (Note: "Nuh Ready Nuh Ready" did not enter the Ultratop 50, but peaked at number 34 on the Flemish Ultratip chart.)	83	—	—	76	—	—	—		96 Months
"One Kiss" (with Dua Lipa)	2018	1	3	1	6	2	1	1	1	6	26	BPI: 6× Platinum; ARIA: 9× Platinum; BRMA: 2× Platinum; BVMI: 2× Platinum; MC: 3× Platinum; RIAA: 4× Platinum; RMNZ: 6× Platinum; SNEP: Diamond	96 Months and Dua Lipa: Complete Edition
"Promises" (with Sam Smith)	2018	1	4	1	15	2	2	1	2	7	65	BPI: 3× Platinum; ARIA: 6× Platinum; BRMA: Platinum; BVMI: Platinum; MC: Platinum; RIAA: Platinum; RMNZ: 4× Platinum; SNEP: Diamond	96 Months and Love Goes
"I Found You" (with Benny Blanco)	2018	29	54	— (Note: "I Found You" did not enter the Ultratop 50, but peaked at number 12 on the Flemish Ultratip chart.)	95	—	—	24	—	— (Note: "I Found You" did not enter the New Zealand Singles Chart, but peaked at number three on the New Zealand Hot Singles Chart.)	—	BPI: Silver; RMNZ: Platinum	Friends Keep Secrets
"I Found You / Nilda's Story" (with Benny Blanco and Miguel)	2019	—	—	—	—	—	—	—	—	—	—		Non-album single
"Giant" (with Rag'n'Bone Man)	2019	2	19	1	29	6	6	3	4	21	—	BPI: 4× Platinum; ARIA: 3× Platinum; BRMA: Platinum; BVMI: Platinum; MC: 2× Platinum; RIAA: Gold; RMNZ: 2× Platinum; SNEP: Diamond	96 Months
"I'm Not Alone 2019"	2019	66	—	— (Note: "I'm Not Alone 2019" did not enter the Ultratop 50, but peaked on the Flemish Ultratip chart.)	—	—	—	69	—	—	—	BPI: Gold	96 Months
"Over Now" (with the Weeknd)	2020	33	17	— (Note: "Over Now" did not enter the Ultratop 50, but peaked at number 13 on the Flemish Ultratip chart.)	22	124	92	26	83	38	38	BPI: Silver; ARIA: Gold	Non-album single
"Live Without Your Love" (Note: Released as Love Regenerator) (with Steve Lacy)	2020	75	—	—	—	—	—	—	—	—	—		96 Months
"By Your Side" (featuring Tom Grennan)	2021	9	—	23	65	90	75	8	8	— (Note: "By Your Side" did not enter the NZ Top 40 Singles Chart, but peaked at number five on the NZ Hot Singles Chart.)	— (Note: "By Your Side" did not enter the Billboard Hot 100, but peaked at number 24 on the Bubbling Under Hot 100 chart.)	BPI: Platinum; ARIA: Gold; BRMA: Gold; MC: Gold; NVPI: Gold; RMNZ: Gold; SNEP: Gold	96 Months and Evering Road (Special Edition)
"We Can Come Together" (with Eli Brown)	2021	—	—	—	—	—	—	—	—	— (Note: "We Can Come Together" did not enter the NZ Top 40 Singles Chart, but peaked at number 36 on the NZ Hot Singles Chart.)	—		Non-album single
"Rollercoaster" (with Solardo)	2021	—	—	—	—	—	—	—	—	— (Note: "Rollercoaster" did not enter the NZ Top 40 Singles Chart, but peaked at number 39 on the NZ Hot Singles Chart.)	—		Rollercoaster
"Lonely" (with Riva Starr featuring Sananda Maitreya)	2022	—	—	—	—	—	—	—	—	— (Note: "Lonely" did not enter the NZ Top 40 Singles Chart, but peaked at number 30 on the NZ Hot Singles Chart.)	—		96 Months
"Potion" (with Dua Lipa and Young Thug)	2022	16	32	—	31	99	85	9	38	35	71	BPI: Silver; ARIA: Gold; MC: Gold; RIAA: Gold; RMNZ: Gold; SNEP: Gold	Funk Wav Bounces Vol. 2
"New Money" (with 21 Savage)	2022	—	—	—	—	—	—	—	—	— (Note: "New Money" did not enter the NZ Top 40 Singles Chart, but peaked at number 14 on the NZ Hot Singles Chart.)	—		Funk Wav Bounces Vol. 2
"Stay with Me" (with Justin Timberlake, Halsey, and Pharrell Williams)	2022	10	78	28	51	—	—	15	16	— (Note: "Stay with Me" did not enter the NZ Top 40 Singles Chart, but peaked at number two on the NZ Hot Singles Chart.)	— (Note: "Stay with Me" did not enter the Billboard Hot 100, but peaked at number two on the Bubbling Under Hot 100 Singles chart.)	BPI: Silver; ARIA: Gold	Funk Wav Bounces Vol. 2
"New to You" (with Normani, Tinashe and Offset)	2022	—	—	—	—	—	—	—	—	— (Note: "New to You" did not enter the NZ Top 40 Singles Chart, but peaked at number 15 on the NZ Hot Singles Chart.)	—		Funk Wav Bounces Vol. 2
"Miracle" (with Ellie Goulding)	2023	1	13	3	71	20	43	1	2	37	—	BPI: 2× Platinum; ARIA: 2× Platinum; BRMA: 2× Platinum; RIAA: Gold; RMNZ: Platinum; SNEP: Diamond	96 Months
"Desire" (with Sam Smith)	2023	6	84	7	—	28	78	7	6	— (Note: "Desire" did not enter the NZ Top 40 Singles Chart, but peaked at number 10 on the NZ Hot Singles Chart.)	—	BPI: Platinum; ARIA: Gold; BRMA: Platinum; RMNZ: Gold; SNEP: Platinum	96 Months
"Body Moving" (with Eliza Rose)	2023	34	—	—	—	—	—	58	—	—	—	BPI: Silver	96 Months
"Lovers in a Past Life" (with Rag'n'Bone Man)	2024	13	—	30	—	—	—	30	27	— (Note: "Lovers in a Past Life" did not enter the NZ Top 40 Singles Chart, but peaked at number 11 on the NZ Hot Singles Chart.)	—	BPI: Gold	96 Months
"Free" (with Ellie Goulding)	2024	35	—	—	—	—	—	60	—	— (Note: "Free" did not enter the NZ Top 40 Singles Chart, but peaked at number eight on the NZ Hot Singles Chart.)	—	BPI: Silver	96 Months
"Smoke the Pain Away"	2025	46	—	17	—	—	—	73	—	— (Note: "Smoke the Pain Away" did not enter the NZ Top 40 Singles Chart, but peaked at number 23 on the NZ Hot Singles Chart.)	—		TBA
"Blessings" (featuring Clementine Douglas)	2025	3	44	3	70	110	24	5	1	— (Note: "Blessings" did not enter the NZ Top 40 Singles Chart, but peaked at number seven on the NZ Hot Singles Chart.)	—	BPI: Platinum; ARIA: Platinum; BRMA: Platinum; RMNZ: Platinum; SNEP: Gold	TBA
"Ocean" (with Jessie Reyez)	2025	34	—	—	—	—	—	79	—	— (Note: "Ocean" did not enter the NZ Top 40 Singles Chart, but peaked at number 12 on the NZ Hot Singles Chart.)	—		TBA
"Release the Pressure" (with Kasabian)	2026	37	—	—	—	—	—	—	—	— (Note: "Release the Pressure" did not enter the NZ Top 40 Singles Chart, but peaked at number 18 on the NZ Hot Singles Chart.)	—		TBA
"Satisfy" (with Jazzy)	2026	42	—	—	—	—	— (Note: "Satisfy" did not reach the Top 100 Singles Chart, but peaked at number 58 at the German airplay chart.)	76	—	— (Note: "Satisfy" did not enter the NZ Top 40 Singles Chart, but peaked at number 9 on the NZ Hot Singles Chart.)	—		TBA
"—" denotes a recording that did not chart in that territory.

=== As featured artist ===
List of singles as featured artist, with selected chart positions and certifications, showing year released and album name
Title	Year	Peak chart positions										Certifications	Album
Title	Year	UK	AUS	BEL (FL)	CAN	FRA	GER	IRE	NLD	NZ	US	Certifications	Album
"Dance wiv Me" (Dizzee Rascal featuring Calvin Harris and Chrome)	2008	1	13	40	—	—	48	5	—	—	—	BPI: 3× Platinum; ARIA: Platinum; RMNZ: 3× Platinum	Tongue n' Cheek
"We Found Love" (Rihanna featuring Calvin Harris)	2011	1	2	3	1	1	1	1	3	1	1	BPI: 6× Platinum; ARIA: 17× Platinum; BRMA: Platinum; BVMI: 3× Platinum; RIAA: 11× Platinum; RMNZ: 8× Platinum	Talk That Talk
"Off the Record" (Tinchy Stryder featuring Calvin Harris and Burns)	2011	24	—	—	—	—	—	—	—	—	—		Non-album single
"—" denotes a recording that did not chart in that territory.

=== Promotional singles ===
List of promotional singles, with selected chart positions, showing year released and album name
Title	Year	Peak chart positions			Album
Title	Year	UK	IRE	SCO	Album
"Da Bongos"/"Brighter Days" (as Stouffer)	2002	—	—	—	Non-album singles
"Let Me Know" (featuring Ayah Marar)	2004	—	—	—	Non-album singles
"Vegas"	2007	—	—	—	I Created Disco
"Rock Band"	2007	—	—	—	Non-album single
"Colours"	2007	—	—	—	I Created Disco
"Yeah Yeah Yeah, La La La"	2009	172	—	—	Ready for the Weekend
"Awooga"	2011	—	—	—	18 Months
"Iron" (with Nicky Romero)	2012	—	—	—	18 Months
"C.U.B.A"	2014	89	78	—	Non-album single
"Slow Acid"	2014	86	—	34	Motion
"Burnin'" (with R3hab)	2014	—	—	77	Motion
"Overdrive (Part 2)" (with Ummet Ozcan)	2014	—	—	—	Motion
"—" denotes a recording that did not chart in that territory.

== Other charted songs ==
List of other charted songs, with selected chart positions and certifications, showing year released and album name
Title	Year	Peak chart positions								Certifications	Album
Title	Year	UK	UK Dance	CAN	FRA	IRE	NZ Heat.	SCO	US Dance/ Elec.	Certifications	Album
"Faith"	2014	—	33	—	178	—	—	64	31		Motion
"Together" (featuring Gwen Stefani)	2014	—	—	—	—	—	—	100	25		Motion
"Dollar Signs" (featuring Tinashe)	2014	—	—	—	—	—	—	—	31		Motion
"Cash Out" (featuring Schoolboy Q, PartyNextDoor and DRAM)	2017	—	—	94	—	67	1	—	20	MC: Gold	Funk Wav Bounces Vol. 1
"Skrt on Me" (featuring Nicki Minaj)	2017	—	—	—	—	—	5	—	23		Funk Wav Bounces Vol. 1
"Prayers Up" (featuring Travis Scott and A-Trak)	2017	—	—	—	—	—	—	—	18		Funk Wav Bounces Vol. 1
"Holiday" (featuring Snoop Dogg, John Legend and Takeoff)	2017	—	—	—	174	—	—	—	26		Funk Wav Bounces Vol. 1
"Hard to Love" (featuring Jessie Reyez)	2017	—	—	—	—	—	—	—	30		Funk Wav Bounces Vol. 1
"Checklist" (with Normani featuring Wizkid)	2018	—	—	—	—	76	—	—	—		Normani x Calvin Harris
"Slow Down" (with Normani)	2018	—	—	—	—	—	—	—	37		Normani x Calvin Harris
"Hypnagogic (I Can't Wait)" (as Love Regenerator)	2020	—	16	—	—	—	—	30	—		Love Regenerator 1 EP and 96 Months
"CP-1" (as Love Regenerator)	2020	—	—	—	—	—	—	56	—		Love Regenerator 1 EP
"The Power of Love II" (as Love Regenerator)	2020	—	—	—	—	—	—	96	—		Love Regenerator 2 EP
"Moving" (as Love Regenerator, with Eli Brown)	2020	—	27	—	—	—	—	53	—		Love Regenerator x Eli Brown EP
"Obsessed" (with Charlie Puth and Shenseea)	2022	71	—	76	—	—	— (Note: "Obsessed" did not enter the NZ Top 40 Singles or the NZ Heatseeker Chart, but peaked at number seven on the NZ Hot Singles Chart.)	×	—		Funk Wav Bounces Vol. 2
"—" denotes a recording that did not chart in that territory

== Guest appearances ==
List of non-single guest appearances, with other performing artists, showing year released and album name
Title	Year	Other artist(s)	Album
"Stillness in Time"	2007	None	Radio 1 Established 1967
"Century"	2009	Tiësto	Kaleidoscope
"Reminds Me of You"	2011	LMFAO	Sorry for Party Rocking (deluxe edition)
"What's Your Name"	2015	Dillon Francis	This Mixtape Is Fire
"Don't Quit"	2017	DJ Khaled, Travis Scott, Jeremih	Grateful

== Production and songwriting credits ==
Title	Year	Artist(s)	Album	Credit(s)
"Love Is the Drug"	2007	Kylie Minogue	Radio 1: Established 1967	Mixing, production
"Michael Jackson"	2007	The Mitchell Brothers	Dressed for the Occasion	All instruments, production, songwriting
"Heart Beat Rock"	2007	Kylie Minogue	X	Mixing, production, songwriting
"In My Arms"	2007	Kylie Minogue	X	Production, songwriting
"Holiday"	2009	Dizzee Rascal featuring Chrome	Tongue n' Cheek	Mixing, production, songwriting
"Road Rage"	2009	Dizzee Rascal featuring Chrome	Tongue n' Cheek	Mixing
"Time Machine"	2010	Example	Won't Go Quietly	All instruments, arrangement, engineering, mixing, production
"Too Much"	2010	Kylie Minogue	Aphrodite	All instruments, arrangement, mixing, production, songwriting
"Hands"	2010	The Ting Tings	Sounds from Nowheresville (deluxe edition)	Mixing, production
"Yeah 3x"	2010	Chris Brown	F.A.M.E.	Songwriting
"Off & On"	2011	Sophie Ellis-Bextor	Make a Scene	All instruments, arrangement, production, songwriting
"Where Have You Been"	2011	Rihanna	Talk That Talk	Engineering, production, songwriting
"One Life"	2011	Mary J. Blige	My Life II... The Journey Continues (Act 1) (European edition)	All instruments, engineering, production, songwriting
"Only the Horses"	2012	Scissor Sisters	Magic Hour	Co-production
"Call My Name"	2012	Cheryl	A Million Lights	All instruments, arrangement, mixing, production, songwriting
"All the Things"	2013	Pitbull featuring Inna	Meltdown	Additional production
"I Will Never Let You Down"	2014	Rita Ora	Non-album singles	Arrangement, production, songwriting
"Olé"	2016	John Newman	Non-album singles	Arrangement, production, songwriting
"Chalice"	2018	Donae'o featuring Belly	Non-album singles	Production
"Some Nights Last for Days"	2020	Example	Some Nights Last for Days	Production
"I Heard You're Married"	2022	The Weeknd featuring Lil Wayne	Dawn FM	Production, songwriting
"I’m Not Here To Make Friends"	2023	Sam Smith	Gloria	Production, songwriting
"Fuckin' Up the Disco"	2024	Justin Timberlake	Everything I Thought It Was	Co-production, songwriting
"No Angels"	2024	Justin Timberlake	Everything I Thought It Was	Co-production, songwriting
"Infinity Sex"	2024	Justin Timberlake	Everything I Thought It Was	Co-production, songwriting

== Remixes ==
=== Charted remixes ===
List of remixes, with selected chart positions and certifications, showing year released and album name
Title	Original artist(s)	Year	Peak chart positions								Certifications	Album
Title	Original artist(s)	Year	UK	AUS	BEL (FL)	FRA	GER	IRE	NLD	NZ	Certifications	Album
"Spectrum (Say My Name)"	Florence and the Machine	2012	1	4	2	—	32	1	55	2	BPI: 3× Platinum; ARIA: 5× Platinum; BRMA: Gold; BVMI: Gold; RMNZ: 3× Platinum	Ceremonials
"Eat, Sleep, Rave, Repeat"	Fatboy Slim and Riva Starr featuring Beardyman	2013	3	47	26	96	—	18	2	—	BPI: Gold	Non-album single
"—" denotes a recording that did not chart in that territory

=== Uncharted remixes ===
Title	Year	Original artist(s)
"Rock Steady"	2006	All Saints
"Get Down"	2007	Groove Armada
"Let's Make Love and Listen to Death from Above"	2007	CSS
"Great DJ"	2008	The Ting Tings
"Hearts on Fire"	2008	Cut Copy
"Uptown"	2008	Primal Scream
"See the Light"	2008	The Hours
"Good Days Bad Days"	2008	Kaiser Chiefs
"We Walk"	2009	The Ting Tings
"The Reeling"	2009	Passion Pit
"Waking Up in Vegas"	2009	Katy Perry
"Supernova"	2009	Mr Hudson featuring Kanye West
"We Are Golden"	2009	Mika
"She Wolf"	2009	Shakira
"One Love"	2009	David Guetta featuring Estelle
"4th of July (Fireworks)"	2010	Kelis
"Promises"	2011	Nero
"Serious"	2011	Manufactured Superstars featuring Selina Albright
"Iced Out"	2011	Burns
"DNA"	2013	Empire of the Sun
"When You Were Young"	2013	The Killers
"Pray to God"	2015	Calvin Harris featuring Haim
"How Deep Is Your Love"	2015	Calvin Harris and Disciples
"The Weekend" (Funk Wav Remix)	2017	SZA
"Alone"	2018	Halsey featuring Stefflon Don

== Music videos ==
List of music videos, showing year released and directors
Title	Year	Director(s)	Ref.
"Acceptable in the 80s"	2007	Woof Wan-Bau	
"The Girls"	2007	Kim Gehrig	
"Merrymaking at My Place"	2007	Kinga Burza	
"Dance wiv Me" (Dizzee Rascal featuring Calvin Harris and Chrome)	2008	Mark Anthony Galluzzo	
"I'm Not Alone"	2009	Christian Holm-Glad	
"Ready for the Weekend"	2009	Ben Ib	
"Flashback"	2009	Vincent Haycock	
"You Used to Hold Me"	2010	Dan & Julian	
"Awooga"	2011	Unknown	
"Bounce" (featuring Kelis)	2011	Vincent Haycock and AG Rojas	
"Feel So Close"	2011	Vincent Haycock	
"Off the Record" (Tinchy Stryder featuring Calvin Harris and Burns)	2011	Luke Monaghan and James Barber	
"We Found Love" (Rihanna featuring Calvin Harris)	2011	Melina Matsoukas	
"Let's Go" (featuring Ne-Yo)	2012	Vincent Haycock	
"We'll Be Coming Back" (featuring Example)	2012	Saman Keshavarz	
"Sweet Nothing" (featuring Florence Welch)	2012	Vincent Haycock	
"Drinking from the Bottle" (featuring Tinie Tempah)	2012	Vincent Haycock and AG Rojas	
"I Need Your Love" (featuring Ellie Goulding)	2013	Emil Nava	
"Thinking About You" (featuring Ayah Marar)	2013	Vincent Haycock	
"Under Control" (with Alesso featuring Hurts)	2013	Emil Nava	
"Summer"	2014	Emil Nava	
"Blame" (featuring John Newman)	2014	Emil Nava	
"Slow Acid"	2014	Emil Nava	
"Open Wide" (featuring Big Sean)	2014	Emil Nava	
"Burnin'" (with R3hab)	2014	Unknown	
"Outside" (featuring Ellie Goulding)	2014	Emil Nava	
"Pray to God" (featuring Haim)	2015	Emil Nava	
"How Deep Is Your Love" (with Disciples)	2015	Emil Nava	
"This Is What You Came For" (featuring Rihanna)	2016	Emil Nava	
"Hype" (with Dizzee Rascal)	2016	Emil Nava	
"My Way"	2016	Emil Nava	
"Feels" (featuring Pharrell Williams, Katy Perry and Big Sean)	2017	Emil Nava	
"Feels" (version two) (featuring Pharrell Williams, Katy Perry and Big Sean)	2017	Emil Nava	
"Hard to Love" (featuring Jessie Reyez)	2017	Philip Harris	
"Faking It" (featuring Kehlani and Lil Yachty)	2017	Emil Nava	
"Nuh Ready Nuh Ready" (featuring PartyNextDoor)	2018	Emil Nava	
"One Kiss" (with Dua Lipa)	2018	Emil Nava	
"Promises" (with Sam Smith)	2018	Emil Nava	
"I Found You / Nilda's Story" (with Benny Blanco and Miguel)	2018	Jake Schreier	
"Giant" (with Rag'n'Bone Man)	2019	Emil Nava	
"Live Without Your Love" (as Love Regenerator, with Steve Lacy)	2020	Emil Nava	
"By Your Side" (featuring Tom Grennan)	2021	Emil Nava	
"Potion" (with Dua Lipa and Young Thug)	2022	Emil Nava	
"Stay With Me" (with Justin Timberlake, Halsey and Pharrell Williams)	2022	Emil Nava	
"Obsessed" (with Charlie Puth and Shenseea)	2022	Emil Nava	
"Miracle" (with Ellie Goulding)	2023	Taz Tron Delix	
"Desire" (with Sam Smith)	2023	KC Locke	
"Body Moving" (with Eliza Roze)	2023	Jeanie Crystal	
"Lovers In A Past Life" (with Rag'n'Bone Man)	2024	Hector Dockrill	
"Blessings" (featuring Clementine Douglas)	2025	India Rose Harris	
