= Ready for the Weekend =

Ready for the Weekend may refer to:

- Ready for the Weekend (album), a 2009 album by Calvin Harris
  - "Ready for the Weekend" (song), the title track
- "Ready for the Weekend", a 2012 song by Icona Pop from Icona Pop
- "Ready for the Weekend", a 2014 song by R3hab and NERVO
- "Ready for the Weekend?", a feature on The Scott Mills Show on BBC Radio 1
