= You Used to Hold Me (Calvin Harris song) =

Single by Calvin Harris

from the album Ready for the Weekend
- Released: 8 February 2010
- Recorded: 2009; (Glasgow, Scotland)
- Genre: Electro house; progressive house; dance-pop
- Length: 3:39
- Label: Fly Eye; Columbia; Sony
- Songwriter: Calvin Harris
- Producer: Calvin Harris

Calvin Harris singles chronology
"Flashback" (2009)	"You Used to Hold Me" (2010)	"Bounce" (2011)

Music video
- "You Used to Hold Me" on YouTube

"You Used to Hold Me" is a song by Scottish DJ Calvin Harris. The song was released on 8 February 2010 as the fourth and final single from his second studio album, Ready for the Weekend. The song marked the last time Harris regularly sang for his songs, as since 2011 he has almost always focused on music production while having guest singers provide the vocals for him.

== Release and promotion ==
To promote "You Used to Hold Me", Harris sang the song on 4Music along with other songs from his new album Ready for the Weekend. He also performed the song at the Big Day Out in Australia and featured it on the setlist of his Ready for the Weekend tour.

== Critical reception ==
The BBC commented on the song:–

"This is a song which will probably not be the sole reason people rush out to buy 'The Greatest Hits of Calvin Harris', whenever such a thing appears. It might not even figure in the Top 10 of reasons to rush out and buy 'The Greatest Hits of Calvin Harris', for all that it has earned the right to be on there in the first place. In fact, it possibly isn't even among the Top 5 of reasons to rush out and buy Calvin's current album 'Ready For The Weekend', from which it is taken. And that's assuming that people still rush out to buy albums, which apparently they do not.

What it is, however, is another of Calvin's hook-heavy dance concoctions which manage to sound light and frothy, and dark and heavy at one and the same time. It has a deceptively short list of ingredients: a mournful one-finger synth refrain; some sneezy drums; some booming drums; flatulent bass; a melody line for the verse and another for the chorus. Oh, and a bit in the chorus which sounds like Calvin singing "beep beep beep", even though he is not. He sounds utterly dedicated to the emotional truth of his words at that point, as if he really needs to get across just how sad he is, that the person who used to hold him no longer wishes to. "Beep," he wails "beep beep".

And which of us, hand on heart, can truly say that we've never been there, never felt what he has felt, never wanted to point that accusing finger, never died inside a thousand times because they just could get the words out? Exactly. He's not just beeping for himself, he's beeping for ALL OF US.

== Chart performance ==
On 29 January 2010, "You Used to Hold Me" first entered the Irish Singles Chart at number 45. The following week, on 5 February 2010, the single climbed to a new peak of number 37. The single first entered the UK Singles Chart on 31 January 2010, at number 47. On 7 February 2010, it rose to number 38. That same week, the single also entered the UK Dance Chart, reaching a current peak of number four.

== Music video ==
The music video was filmed in November 2009 – 2010. The video shows Harris driving around in a monster truck and girls dancing in front of a wall while Harris sings the song in the truck and performs it on some CDJs and mixer.

== Track listing ==
CD single
No.	Title	Length
1.	"You Used to Hold Me"	3:49
2.	"You Used to Hold Me" (Laidback Luke Remix)	7:00

You Used to Hold Me - EP
No.	Title	Length
1.	"You Used to Hold Me"	3:49
2.	"You Used to Hold Me" (Extended Mix)	6:17
3.	"You Used to Hold Me" (Laidback Luke Remix)	7:00
4.	"You Used to Hold Me" (Nero Remix)	6:03

== Charts ==
Chart (2010)	Peak position
Australia (ARIA)	57
Ireland (IRMA)	30
Scotland Singles (OCC)	21
UK Singles (OCC)	27
UK Dance (OCC)	4

== Certifications ==
Certifications for You Used to Hold Me
Region	Certification	Certified units/sales
Australia (ARIA)	Platinum	70,000^{^}
United Kingdom (BPI)	Silver	200,000^{‡}
^{^} Shipments figures based on certification alone.^{‡} Sales+streaming figures based on certification alone.
