= Flashback (Calvin Harris song) =

Single by Calvin Harris

from the album Ready for the Weekend
- Released: 2 November 2009
- Recorded: 2009
- Genre: Electro house
- Length: 3:49
- Label: Fly Eye; Columbia
- Songwriter: Calvin Harris
- Producer: Calvin Harris

Calvin Harris singles chronology
"Ready for the Weekend" (2009)	"Flashback" (2009)	"You Used to Hold Me" (2010)

"Flashback" is a song by Scottish musician Calvin Harris from his second studio album, Ready for the Weekend (2009). The song was released in the UK on 2 November 2009 and features Jordanian singer Ayah Marar. Harris and Marar would later work together again on Harris' 2013 single "Thinking About You".

== Release and promotion ==
"Flashback" was released as the album's third single on 2 November 2009. To promote the track, Calvin was originally scheduled to perform on the UK morning talk show GMTV, however the show declined Calvin's appearance as they thought the song was "too dancy" for the programme.

The following week, Disney Channel promoted the message card for "Flashback" after the 4:30 showing of Hannah Montana, showing an image of Calvin wearing diamond sunglasses, as well as the words "Flashback [Calvin Harris]".

== Track listing ==
Digital download
No.	Title	Length
1.	"Flashback" (Radio Edit)	3:40
2.	"Flashback" (Album Version)	3:49
3.	"Flashback" (David Guetta's One Love Remix)	7:11
4.	"Flashback" (Eric Prydz Remix)	7:50
5.	"Flashback" (Goldie Remix)	4:45
6.	"Flashback" (Instrumental Mix)	3:46

CD single
No.	Title	Length
1.	"Flashback"	3:49
2.	"Flashback" (Eric Prydz Remix)	7:52

12" single
No.	Title	Length
1.	"Flashback" (David Guetta One Love Remix)
2.	"Flashback" (Original Mix)
3.	"Flashback" (Eric Prydz Remix)
4.	"Flashback" (Goldie Remix)

== Credits and personnel ==
- Written, arranged, produced and performed by Calvin Harris
- All instruments performed by Calvin Harris
- Additional vocals by Ayah Marar
- Recorded at the Earth's Core, Glasgow
- Mastered by Naweed at Whitfield Mastering London
- "Flashback" (David Guetta One Love Remix): Mastered by Brian "Big Bass" Gardner at Bernie Grundman Mastering, CA. Remix and additional production by David Guetta for Gum Productions
- "Flashback" (Eric Prydz Remix): Remix and additional production by Eric Prydz
- "Flashback" (Goldie Remix): Remix and additional production by Goldie. Engineered by Jim Muir

== Music video ==
Harris stated on his Twitter that he was busy filming the video for the songs. The video was uploaded to Harris' official YouTube page on 13 October 2009. But then Harris removed it stating that the beat was too fast and that the actual version is at "the right speed". All scenes in the video are shot in Ibiza. It shows Harris at a penthouse, riding in a limousine, walking the streets and boarding a small boat with some girls. It also features him DJing at Pacha. It also shows Harris alone on a speedboat early in the morning while wearing white and looking at Polaroid shots of him and the girls strewn all over the boat and some washed on the sea, along with bottles and cans of liquor and some of the stuff the girls used like an Indian headdress. All the while trying to remember the events of last night because he was "drunk" the whole evening.

== Release history ==
Region	Date	Format
United Kingdom	2 November 2009	12"; CD; digital download

== Charts ==
=== Weekly charts ===
Chart (2009)	Peak position
Australia (ARIA)	38
Australia Club (ARIA)	8
Belgium (Ultratip Bubbling Under Flanders)	10
Belgium (Ultratip Bubbling Under Wallonia)	7
Ireland (IRMA)	23
Scotland Singles (OCC)	16
UK Singles (Official Charts Company)	18
UK Dance (Official Charts Company)	2

=== Year-end charts ===
Chart (2009)	Position
UK Singles Chart	197

== Certifications ==
Region	Certification	Certified units/sales
Australia (ARIA)	Platinum	70,000^{‡}
United Kingdom (BPI)	Silver	200,000^{‡}
^{‡} Sales+streaming figures based on certification alone.
