= Hype (song) =

Single by Dizzee Rascal and Calvin Harris
- Released: 24 June 2016
- Recorded: 2016
- Genre: Big beat; hip hop; future house; techno; EDM; hip house
- Length: 3:31
- Label: Dirtee Stank; Island
- Songwriters: Dylan Mills; Calvin Harris
- Producer: Calvin Harris

Dizzee Rascal singles chronology
"How Love Begins" (2016)	"Hype" (2016)	"Space" (2017)

Calvin Harris singles chronology
"This Is What You Came For" (2016)	"Hype" (2016)	"My Way" (2016)

Music video
- "Hype" on YouTube

"Hype" is a song by English rapper Dizzee Rascal and Scottish DJ Calvin Harris. The song was released as a single on 24 June 2016. Rascal and Harris had previously collaborated on the 2008 single "Dance wiv Me", the 2009 single "Holiday" and on "Here 2 China", a song from Harris's third studio album, 18 Months (2012).

Although Harris and Rascal had previously worked together on several singles they did so remotely, emailing the track components back and forth, "Hype" marks the first song they worked on together in the same studio at the same time. Dizzee claims the words were written in the studio in an hour, and the vocals recorded and finished in a further half hour.

== Track listing ==
Digital download
No.	Title	Length
1.	"Hype"	3:31

== Charts ==
Chart (2016)	Peak position
Ireland (IRMA)	71
New Zealand Heatseekers (Recorded Music NZ)	2
Scotland Singles (OCC)	13
UK Singles (OCC)	34
UK Dance (OCC)	12

== Certifications ==
Region	Certification	Certified units/sales
New Zealand (RMNZ)	Gold	15,000^{‡}
United Kingdom (BPI)	Silver	200,000^{‡}
^{‡} Sales+streaming figures based on certification alone.
