= Calvin Harris =

Scottish DJ (born 1984)

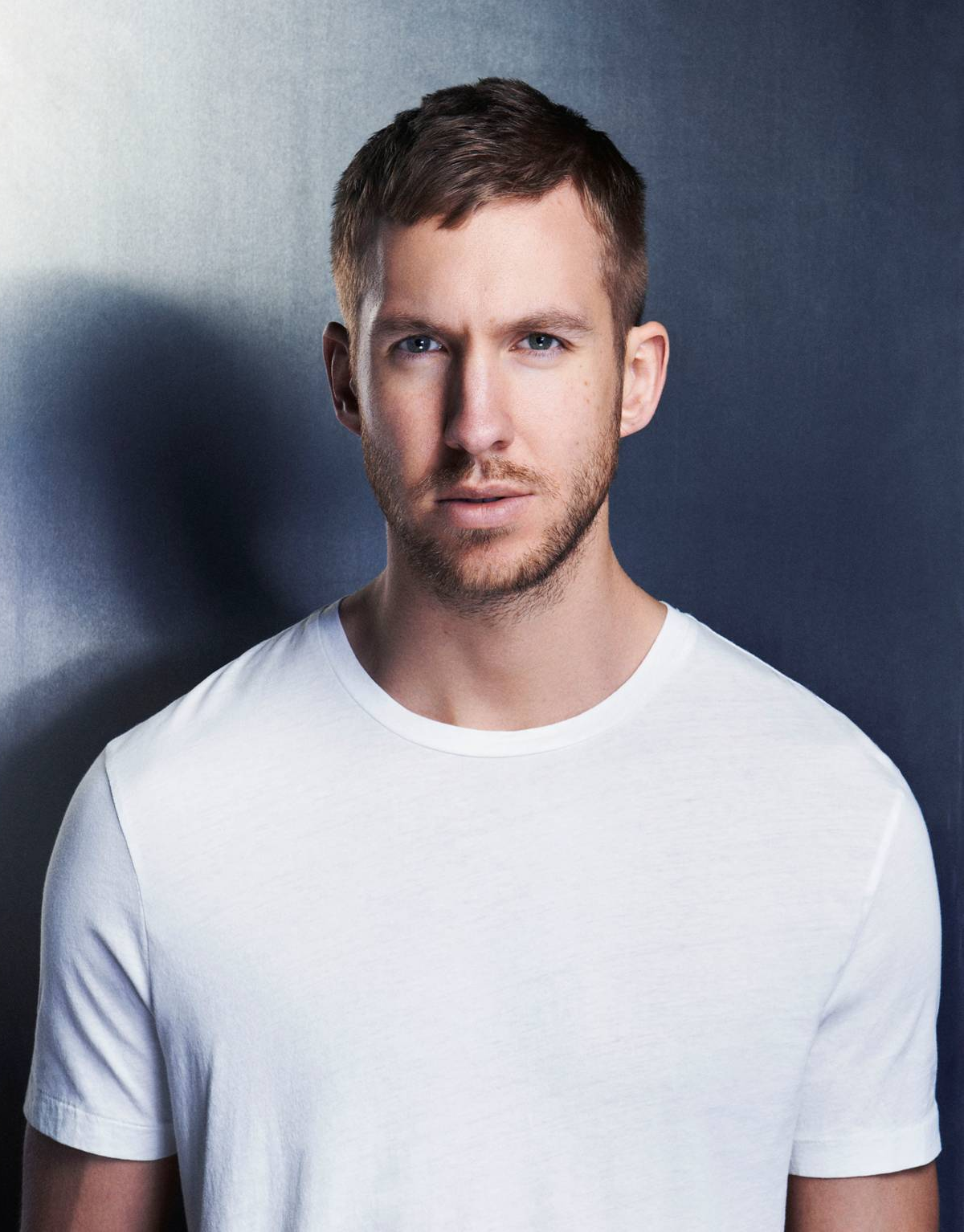
- Harris in 2015
- Born: Adam Richard Wiles; 17 January 1984 (age 42); Dumfries, Scotland
- Other names: Stouffer; Love Regenerator
- Occupations: Disc jockey; record producer; singer; songwriter
- Years active: 2002–present
- Works: Discography; production
- Spouse: Vick Hope (m. 2023)
- Children: 1
- Awards: Full list
- Musical career
- Genres: EDM; electro house; electropop; dance-pop; nu-disco
- Instruments: Piano; keyboards; synthesiser; guitar; bass guitar; sampler; sequencer; vocals
- Labels: Fly Eye; Columbia; Ministry of Sound; Ultra; Roc Nation; Deconstruction; Spinnin'
- Website: calvinharris.com

Adam Richard Wiles (born 17 January 1984), known professionally as Calvin Harris (and sometimes under the stage name Love Regenerator), is a Scottish DJ, record producer, singer and songwriter. His debut studio album, I Created Disco (2007) was preceded by the singles "Acceptable in the 80s" and "The Girls", both of which achieved commercial success in Europe and Australia. His second album, Ready for the Weekend (2009), debuted atop the official album charts in his native Scotland as well as the United Kingdom, and its lead single, "I'm Not Alone", became his first song to reach number one in the UK Singles Charts. On his early tracks, Harris mostly sang in his songs.

Harris rose to international prominence in 2012 with the release of his third studio album, 18 Months, which topped the UK Albums Chart and became his first album to chart on the US Billboard 200, peaking at number 19. In 2014, he released his fourth studio album, Motion, which debuted at number one in his native Scotland, as well as number two in the United Kingdom and number five in the United States. His fifth studio album, Funk Wav Bounces Vol. 1 (2017) peaked at number two in both the United Kingdom and the United States, also becoming his third consecutive number one-album on the US Dance/Electronic Albums chart. His sixth studio album, Funk Wav Bounces Vol. 2 (2022), served as a sequel to his previous release, and achieved commercial success internationally. He holds the Official Charts Company record for most number one singles in the United Kingdom during the 2010s decade, and in 2013 surpassed Michael Jackson and his record for the most top ten singles from one album, achieving nine from 18 Months, against Jackson's seven.

In October 2014 Harris became the first artist to place three songs simultaneously on the top 10 of Billboard's Dance/Electronic Songs chart. He also became the first UK solo artist to reach more than one billion streams on Spotify. Harris has received 23 Brit Award nominations–winning British Producer of the Year and British Single of the Year in 2019, as well as five Grammy nominations, including a win for Best Music Video in 2013. In 2013 he also received an Ivor Novello Award, and was named the Top Dance/Electronic Artist at the 2015 Billboard Music Awards. He appeared on Debrett's 2017 list of the most influential people in the United Kingdom, and topped Forbes' list of the world's highest-paid DJs for six consecutive years from 2013 to 2018.

== Early life and beginnings ==
Adam Richard Wiles was born on 17 January 1984 in Dumfries, Scotland, to English parents, who married in their native Oxford before moving to Dumfries. His father worked as a biochemist. He has an elder sister and brother. Wiles attended Calside Primary School then Dumfries High School, and, after leaving school, he stocked shelves in supermarkets and worked in a local fish processing factory to buy DJ gear.

He was first attracted to electronic music in his teens and began recording bedroom demos in 1999. When Harris was 18, he released two songs, "Da Bongos" and "Brighter Days". Both were released as 12-inch club singles and CD-EPs by the label Prima Facie in early 2002 under the name "Stouffer". With these singles to his credit, Harris moved from Scotland to London, hoping to learn from the local music scene. Only one of his songs, "Let Me Know" with vocalist Ayah Marar on the Unabombers' 2004 live-mix CD Electric Soul, Vol. 2, was released during his time in London. With the lack of job opportunities and money, he returned home to Dumfries and began posting homemade solo recordings to his Myspace page. His popularity on the social media website prompted Mark Gillespie, a talent booker for the dance-festival firm Global Gathering who had recently founded his own management firm, to make Harris the company's first signee. Gillespie continues to represent Harris today. Regarding his stage name, the artist has stated that the name 'Calvin Harris' was his stage alter-ego and that he prefers not to be addressed as "Calvin" outside of his performances. Initially tolerant of it as a nickname early in his career, he has since emphasised the importance of being addressed by his real name, Adam Wiles, in all of his personal interactions. "At the start of my career people were meeting me for the first time and I let it slide. It was sort of a nickname". When family and friends began using the stage name, he said, "I was like, I'm sorry this is ridiculous. You're speaking to my alter ego".

== Career ==
=== 2006–2008: I Created Disco and breakthrough ===
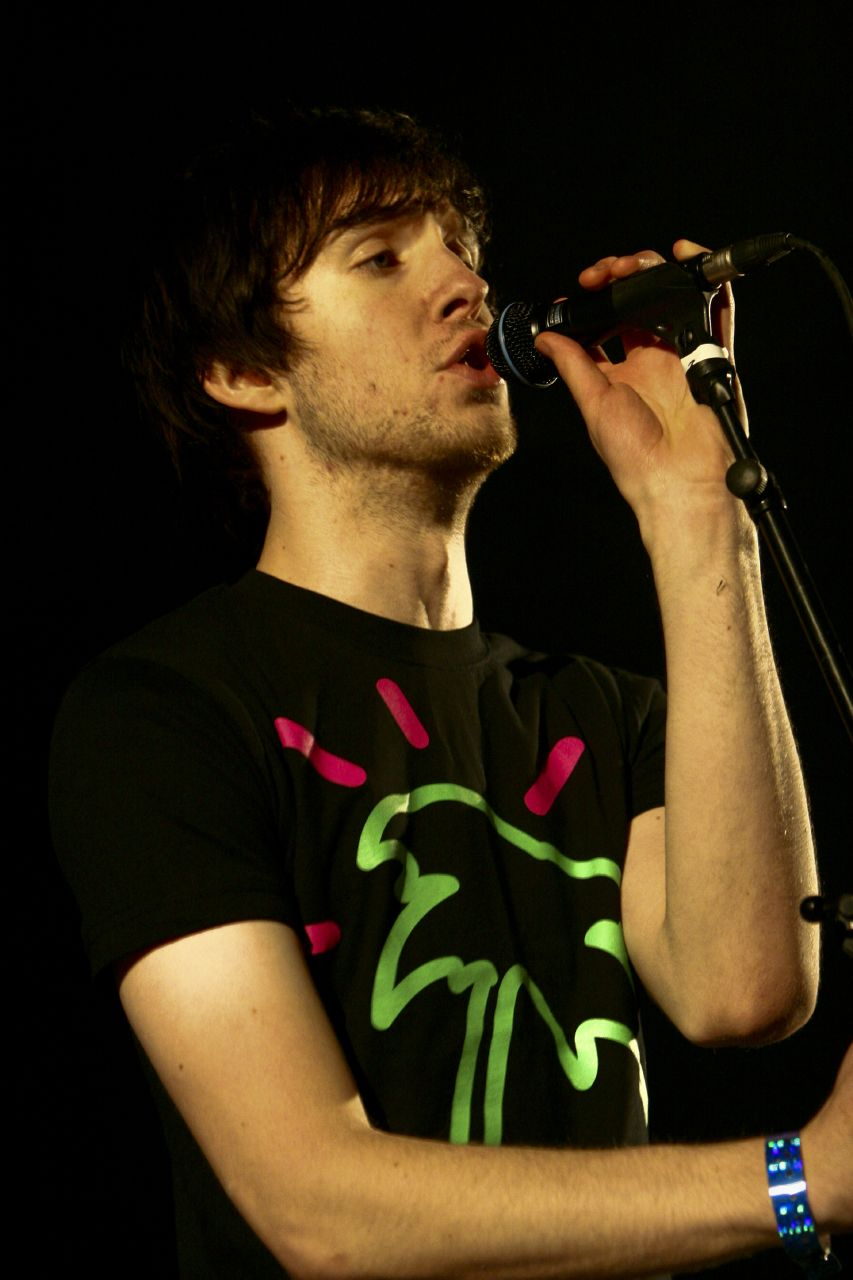
Harris performing at the Eurockéennes (2008)

Harris signed contracts with Three Six Zero Group (management), EMI (publishing), and Sony BMG (recording) in 2006 after he had been discovered on the social networking website Myspace. Later in 2006, Harris produced a remix of All Saints' single "Rock Steady".

Harris's debut album, I Created Disco, was released in June 2007. He started working on the album in 2006 after he moved back from living in London to his hometown of Dumfries. All 14 tracks were written, produced, and performed solely by Harris, and all recording and producing for the album took place on an Amiga computer. To promote I Created Disco, Harris embarked on a tour of the UK, supporting Faithless and Groove Armada. I Created Disco was certified gold by the British Phonographic Industry (BPI). It reached number eight on the UK Albums Chart and number 19 on the US Top Electronic Albums.

The album contained uptempo electroclash songs that were influenced by music from the 1980s. The song, "Vegas", was issued on limited edition vinyl. The first wide-release single from the album was released in March 2007. "Acceptable in the 80s", a tribute to the style and culture of the decade, peaked at number ten on the UK Singles Chart, remaining on the chart for 15 weeks. "The Girls", the album's second single, peaked at number three on the UK Singles Chart. The third and final release from the album, "Merrymaking at My Place", peaked at number 43 on the chart.

The same year Harris caught the attention of Australian pop singer Kylie Minogue after his recordings had been passed on to her by another record producer. This led to him co-writing and producing two songs, "Heart Beat Rock" and "In My Arms", on her 2007 album X, the latter becoming a top 10 single in the UK. Harris said that working with Minogue was "surreal, but fun" although he admitted to Mixmag in 2007 to "needing a few drinks before meeting her". Harris also contributed the song "Off & On" to Róisín Murphy's album Overpowered, but it was cut from the album. Harris would later give the song to Sophie Ellis-Bextor to record for her 2011 album Make a Scene. Harris also produced a remix of the second single "4th of July (Fireworks)" from Kelis' album Flesh Tone. He additionally reworked singles by Jamiroquai, Groove Armada, All Saints, and CSS.

In 2008 Harris collaborated with rapper Dizzee Rascal on his single "Dance wiv Me", producing the track and singing the hook. The single topped the UK Singles Chart for four weeks and was certified platinum by the BPI, selling 600,000 copies. It was shortlisted for the 2008 Popjustice £20 Music Prize. In 2009, it received a Brit Award nomination for British Single and an Ivor Novello Award nomination for Best Contemporary Song. On 18 October 2008, Harris was featured on BBC Radio 1's Essential Mix on a two-hour set.

=== 2008–2010: Ready for the Weekend ===
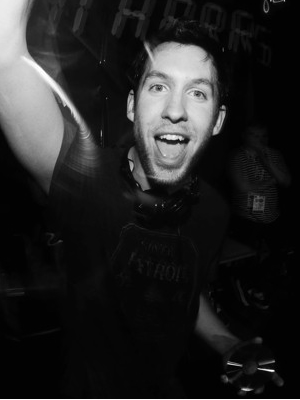
Harris performing in Venice, 2010

Harris's second album, Ready for the Weekend, was released in August 2009 and entered at number one on the UK Albums Chart, being certified gold by the BPI within two months of release. Eleven of the fourteen tracks on the album were sung, produced, and written solely by Harris. "I'm Not Alone", released as the album's lead single in April 2009, debuted at number one on the UK Singles Chart. The follow-up single, "Ready for the Weekend", reached number three. The third single, "Flashback", featuring Jordanian singer Ayah Marar reached number eighteen in the UK. During promotion of the album, Harris hosted a series of videos on YouTube titled Jam TV, in which musicians such as Florence Welch, Goldie, and Katy Perry tried to open pots of jam. At the 2010 Brit Awards, Harris received a nomination for Best British Male.

On 8 February 2010, "You Used to Hold Me" was released as the fourth and final single from the album. It peaked at number 27 on the UK Singles Chart. The song marked the last time Harris regularly sang on his records, opting to focus more on music production while having guest singers provide the vocals for him. The same year, shortly after his "Ready for the Weekend tour" wrapped up, Harris parted ways with members of his band in which he served as lead vocalist and made the decision to stop doing live shows. In an interview with Billboard, Harris said that, "I thought I'd exhausted every avenue [on the two albums] and it takes a long time to make me sound good, which is why I stopped singing live as well. I'd like to think of someone who's better-looking, a better singer, better dancer to be the frontperson for the song." He also released several remixes, including remixes of Shakira's "She Wolf", Katy Perry's "Waking Up in Vegas", Mr Hudson's "Supernova" (featuring Kanye West), and Mika's "We Are Golden".

Harris also produced Dizzee Rascal's next single titled "Holiday", which topped the UK Singles Chart in August 2009. Harris made a guest appearance as vocalist on Tiësto's song "Century" on the Dutch producer's album, Kaleidoscope. Harris also produced and mixed The Ting Tings' single "Hands" which was released on 18 August 2010. The song was originally set to become the first single of the duo's second studio album, but they cancelled the album plans and the song was included as a bonus track on the deluxe edition of Sounds from Nowheresville. On 14 November 2009, Harris invaded the stage of the ITV talent competition The X Factor during a live performance by Irish contestants John and Edward Grimes, holding a pineapple on his head. He later apologised on Twitter.

Harris claimed that Chris Brown's "Yeah 3x", released in October 2010, plagiarised his 2009 single "I'm Not Alone". After considering similarities between the two songs, Harris was subsequently added to the songwriting credits on the single and the F.A.M.E. album. Harris was also featured on Kylie Minogue's eleventh studio album, Aphrodite, collaborating the track "Too Much".

=== 2011–2013: 18 Months and international prominence ===
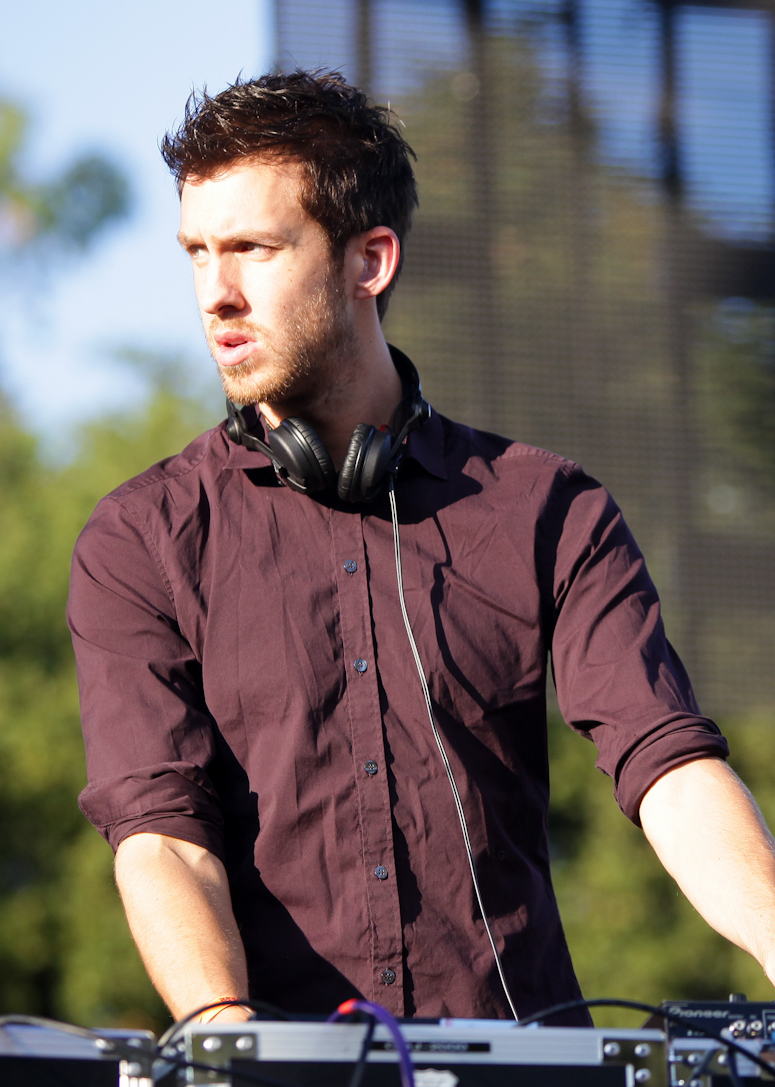
Harris performing in Orange County, California (2011)

In 2011 Harris toured as a support act for the European leg of Barbadian singer Rihanna's Loud Tour. Rihanna was quoted as saying, "Calvin is the perfect fit for the Loud Tour. He is going to bring something unique and fun for the fans." Harris played the 2011 Mardi Gras Party in Sydney on 5 March. Harris was also featured on LMFAO's album Sorry for Party Rocking, appearing on the track "Reminds Me of You", which is based on Harris's own song "Awooga". Harris produced Tinchy Stryder's second single, "Off the Record", from his fourth studio album, Full Tank. The track had its premiere on 15 September 2011 and was released in the UK on 6 November 2011.

Harris released the single "Bounce", the first single from his upcoming album, a collaboration with Kelis that debuted at number two on the UK Singles Chart in June 2011. "Feel So Close", the second single from the album, was released in August 2011 and also reached number two in the United Kingdom. "Feel So Close" became his first solo entry on the Billboard Hot 100 in the US, peaking at number 12. He performed at the 2011 Jingle Bell Ball concert and was announced as one of the headline acts at a number of Southern Hemisphere 2011/2012 new year music festivals.

Following a stint as the support act on the Australian leg of Rihanna's tour, Harris produced Rihanna's songs "We Found Love" and "Where Have You Been". The former was included on Harris's upcoming album 18 Months and premiered on Capital FM radio in the UK on 22 September 2011. "We Found Love" topped the charts in 27 countries worldwide, including the UK where it became Harris's third UK number one, peaked in the top 10 in 30 countries, and broke many records worldwide. Topping the Billboard Hot 100 for 10 non-consecutive weeks, it was Harris's first US number one and was also Rihanna's longest-running US number one and the longest-running number one of 2011. "We Found Love" was later ranked number 24 on the list of the all-time top 100 songs on the Billboard Hot 100. In 2013, "We Found Love" was placed at number three on Billboard's top 10 dance-pop collaborations of all time.

Harris co-wrote and co-produced the bonus track "One Life" for R&B singer Mary J. Blige's album My Life II... The Journey Continues (2011). He also worked with the pop band Scissor Sisters on the single "Only the Horses" from their fourth studio album, Magic Hour. He wrote and produced Cheryl Cole's single "Call My Name", the lead single from her third album A Million Lights. He also produced a remix of Florence and the Machine's "Spectrum" titled "Spectrum (Say My Name)". The song was released as the album's fifth single on 5 July 2012. It was serviced to radio in the UK on 2 July 2012. It became the group's first single to peak at number one on the UK Singles Chart.

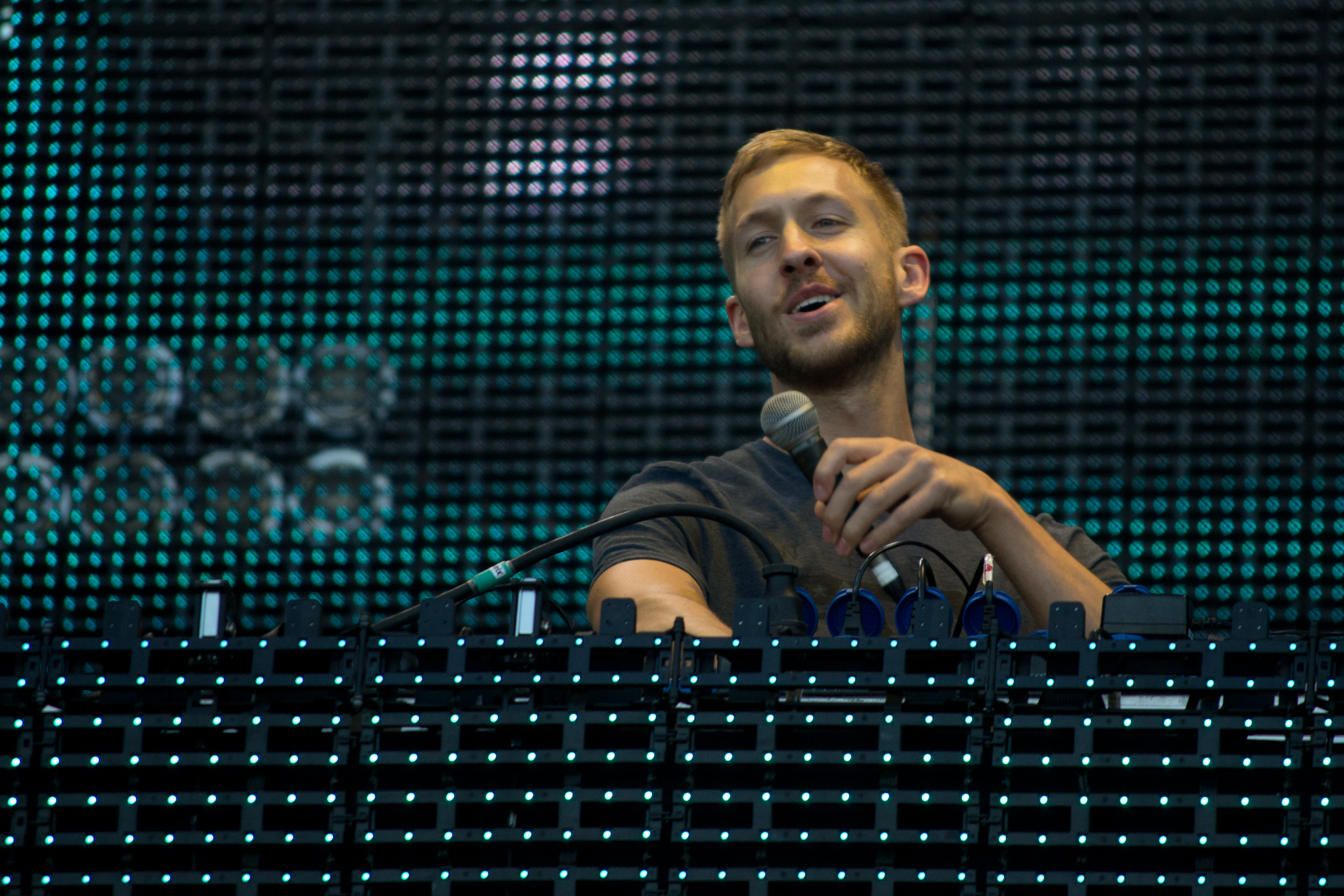
Harris performing at Rock in Rio, Madrid, 2012

"Let's Go" featuring Ne-Yo, the third single from the album, was released in April 2012 and reached number two in the UK Singles Chart. It was his second US Billboard Hot 100 appearance as a main artist, charting at number 17. The song received a nomination for Best Dance Recording at the 55th Grammy Awards which was held in February 2013. The album's fourth single "We'll Be Coming Back" was released in July 2012. Featuring rapper Example, it peaked at number two in the UK. The fifth single, "Sweet Nothing", features Florence Welch of Florence and the Machine and was released on 14 October 2012. It peaked at number one on the UK Singles Chart and at number 10 on the US Billboard Hot 100. The song received a nomination for Best Dance Recording at the 56th Grammy Awards.

His third studio album 18 Months, was released on 29 October 2012. Harris eventually made UK chart history by becoming the first artist to attain eight top-10 singles from one studio album, breaking the record previously set by Michael Jackson. In March 2017, the record was surpassed once again by Ed Sheeran, after his album ÷ spawned 10 top-10 songs on the UK chart. 18 Months received a nomination for Best Dance/Electronica Album at the 56th Grammy Awards. Harris was also nominated for Best British Male Solo Artist at the 2013 Brit Awards in February.

Harris was the house DJ at the 2012 MTV Video Music Awards held at the Staples Center, Los Angeles, where he won Best Electronic Video for "Feel So Close" and Video of the Year alongside Rihanna for "We Found Love". Harris performed as part of the post-race concert of the 2013 Formula One Bahrain Grand Prix in April 2013. At the 2013 Ivor Novello Awards held at the Grosvenor House Hotel, London in May, Harris received the British Academy's Ivor Novello Award for Songwriter of the Year, with Harris calling it "easily the greatest achievement of my entire life". In 2012, Harris made statements explaining why he wanted to stop singing on tracks stating, "I want each track as good as it can possibly be, which usually means me not singing on it."

=== 2013–2015: Motion and continued success ===
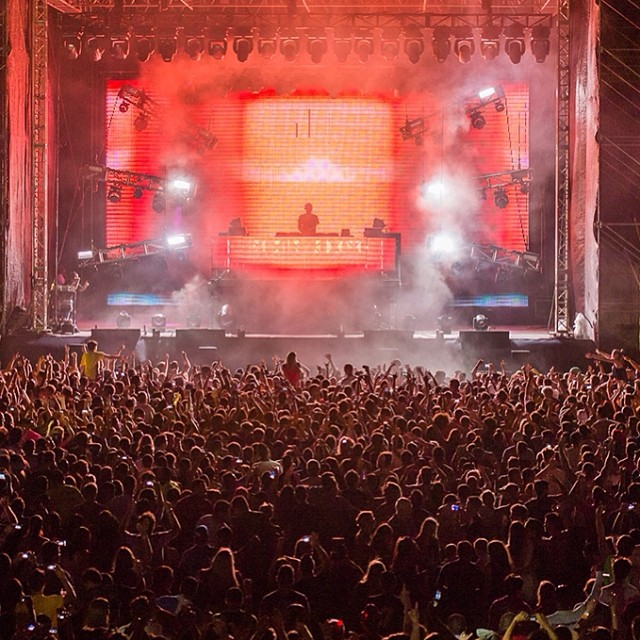
Harris performing at the Hard Rock Hotel & Casino, 2014

On 7 October 2013 Harris and Swedish DJ Alesso released a collaborative single with synth-pop duo Hurts called "Under Control" as the first single from his fourth album. The song debuted at number one in the UK. Later that month, Harris remixed The Killers' song "When You Were Young" for the deluxe edition of their greatest hits album Direct Hits. He unveiled the full six-minute version through Rolling Stone and told the magazine: "It was a real honour to be asked to remix one of my favourite modern bands, and it was an exciting challenge for me to update this classic track for the dance-floor in a tasteful and respectful way".

On 14 March 2014 Harris's song "Summer" premiered on the UK's Capital FM. The track which was released as the album's second single debuted at number one on the UK Singles Chart, becoming Harris's sixth UK number-one single. It also became Harris's highest-charting solo single on the US Billboard Hot 100, peaking at number seven. "Summer" was Spotify's most-streamed track of 2014 with over 200 million streams. Harris also produced the single "I Will Never Let You Down" for British singer Rita Ora. On 18 May 2014, the song debuted at number one on the UK Singles Chart, two weeks after his song "Summer" debuted at the top of the charts.

In April 2014 Harris performed on the main stage of Coachella Festival. His set attracted the second largest crowd in the festival's history, topped only by the 2012 set of Dr. Dre and Snoop Dogg which featured a transparent Pepper's ghost image of Tupac Shakur. That year, he was also a headline act at several prominent music festivals, including Lollapalooza, Austin City Limits Music Festival, the iTunes Festival in London, Electric Daisy Carnival, and the iHeartRadio Music Festival.

The third single, "Blame", was a collaboration with vocalist John Newman. It was released in September 2014 to positive reviews from music critics and debuted at number one on the UK Singles Chart, giving Harris his third consecutive UK number-one single (and his seventh solo single overall). After the release of the song, Harris became the first British solo artist to reach more than a billion streams on Spotify. Later that month, Harris uploaded an instrumental track called "C.U.B.A." to SoundCloud. "Outside", the fourth single from the album, featuring Ellie Goulding, was released in October 2014. It marked the second collaboration between Harris and Goulding, following the internationally successful single "I Need Your Love" from 2013. The instrumental track "Slow Acid" was released as a promotional single from the album on 14 October 2014.

His fourth album, Motion, was released on 4 November 2014. It includes the previously released singles "Under Control", "Summer", "Blame", and "Outside". Another track from the album, "Pray to God", featuring rock band trio Haim, was released on 11 February 2015. At the 2015 Brit Awards, "Summer" was nominated for Best British Single and British Artist Video of the Year. At the 2015 Glamour Awards in London on 2 June, Harris was named Glamour UK's Man of the Year. He was also ranked 6th on Billboard's Top 30 EDM Power Players. The same month, he was part of the main stage line-up at the Electric Daisy Carnival held in Las Vegas.

On 17 July 2015 Harris and London-based production trio Disciples released the single "How Deep Is Your Love". The song peaked at number two on the UK Singles Chart, giving Harris his 19th top-10 entry in the UK. It peaked at number one on the ARIA Charts, giving Harris his first chart-topper in Australia. The song peaked at number three on the Hot Dance/Electronic Songs in the US and marked Harris's eighth top-10 entry since the chart's launch, making it the most of any act. In September, Harris was featured on Dillon Francis's EP This Mixtape Is Fire, collaborating on a Moombahton-style track entitled "What's Your Name". At the 2016 Brit Awards, Harris received three nominations: Best British Male Solo Artist, "How Deep Is Your Love" for British Single of the Year, and Best British Video.

=== 2016–2017: Funk Wav Bounces Vol. 1 ===
Harris released a new single titled "This Is What You Came For", which features Rihanna, co-written with Taylor Swift, on 29 April 2016. The single debuted at number two on the UK Singles Chart. It peaked at number three on the US Billboard Hot 100, becoming Harris's second top five song. It also reached number one on the US Hot Dance/Electronic Songs and became Harris's tenth number one on sister chart Dance/Mix Show Airplay and his fourth chart-topper on the Hot Dance Club Songs Chart. It topped the charts in Australia, Canada, and Ireland and peaked within the top ten of the charts in Germany, Ireland, New Zealand and Switzerland.

On 24 June 2016 Harris released a collaboration with Dizzee Rascal, titled "Hype". On 8 July 2016, John Newman released the track "Olé", which was produced by Harris. On 16 September 2016, Harris released "My Way", where he also performed vocals for the song.

On 21 February 2017 he announced the song "Slide", his collaboration with American singer-songwriter Frank Ocean and hip-hop group Migos. The song was released on 25 February 2017. Harris released a collaboration with Young Thug, Ariana Grande, and Pharrell Williams titled "Heatstroke" on 31 March 2017. In May, he announced that his forthcoming fifth studio album, Funk Wav Bounces Vol. 1, would be released on 30 June 2017. The album featured appearances from the likes of Travis Scott, Kehlani, Future, Katy Perry, Big Sean, John Legend, Khalid, Schoolboy Q, DRAM, Nicki Minaj, Lil Yachty, Jessie Reyez, PartyNextDoor and Snoop Dogg.

=== 2018–2021: Standalone singles and Love Regenerator alias ===
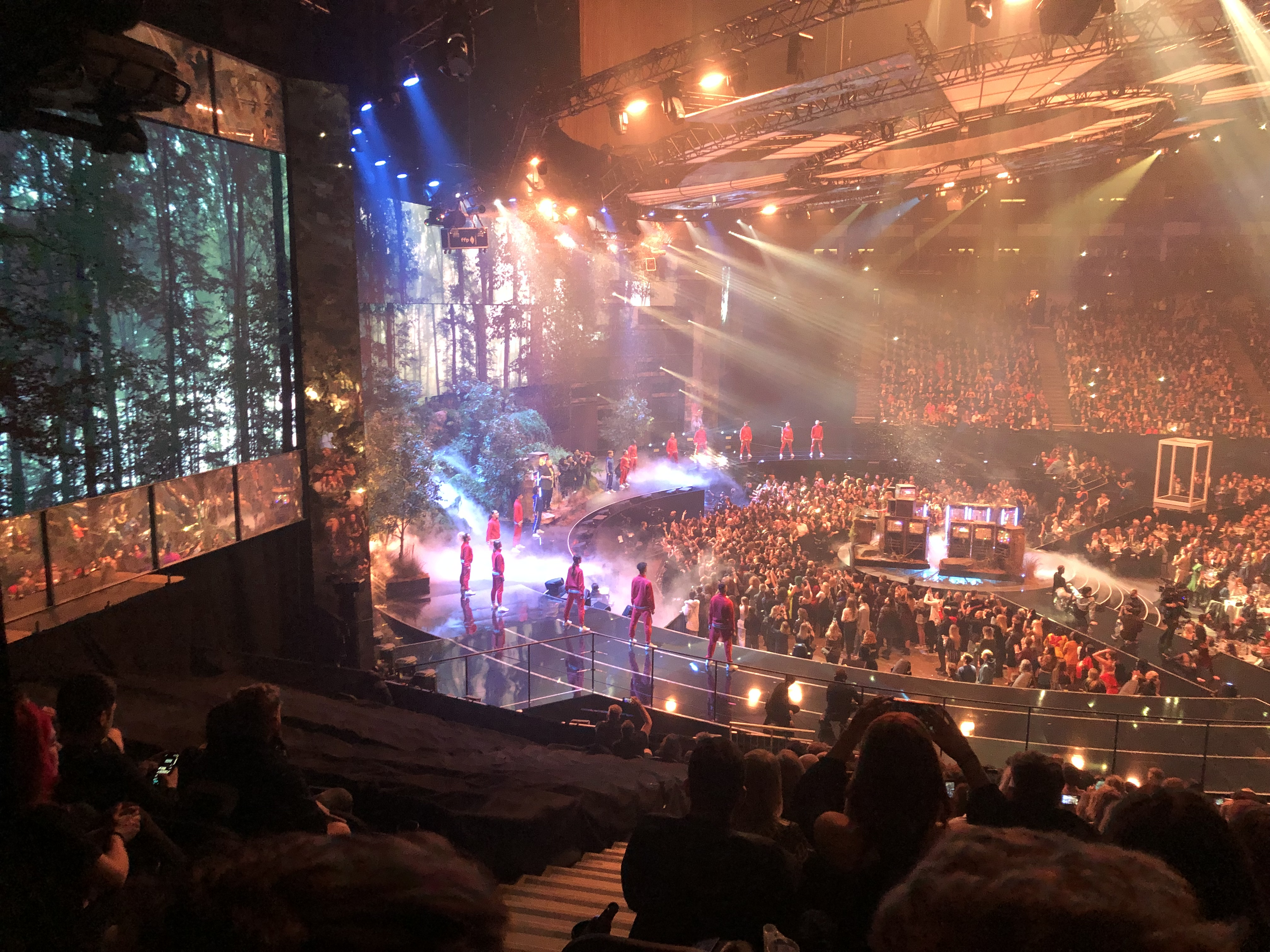
Harris performing at the 2019 Brit Awards with Rag'n'Bone Man, Sam Smith and Dua Lipa

On 8 February 2018 Harris collaborated with PartyNextDoor to release a dancehall-influenced house track titled "Nuh Ready Nuh Ready". On 6 April 2018, he released "One Kiss" with Dua Lipa. On 17 August 2018, the next single "Promises" was released with Sam Smith. The music video for the song was released on 4 September and honours the LGBTQ community with references to the ball scene and voguing. In November 2018, he released "I Found You", a collaboration with Benny Blanco. The song features his first time singing on a track since his 2016 single "My Way". It peaked at number 29 in the UK. On 22 October 2018, Harris collaborated with Normani on the two track EP Normani x Calvin Harris. He topped Forbes' Highest-Paid DJs of 2018, becoming his sixth consecutive year to top the list (2013–2018).

His next single "Giant", a collaboration with English singer Rag'n'Bone Man was released in January 2019, peaking in the top 10 in several countries, including at number 2 in the UK. That year, mega-club Ushuaïa Ibiza booked Harris for a weekly Friday DJ residency for six weeks in August and September 2019.

In 2020 Harris went on "rediscover the way he originally began producing music 22 years ago" and released two EPs, Love Regenerator 1 and Love Regenerator 2, under his Love Regenerator alias. The third EP Love Regenerator 3 was released on 13 March 2020.

On 22 August 2020 Harris announced his new song called, "Over Now" with Canadian singer The Weeknd. The song was released on 28 August 2020. On 21 May 2021, Harris announced the song "By Your Side" featuring Tom Grennan. The song was released on 4 June 2021.

=== 2022–present: Funk Wav Bounces Vol. 2 and 96 Months ===
On 3 March 2022 Harris hinted at the release of his sixth album, Funk Wav Bounces Vol. 2, on his Twitter. The lead single "Potion", featuring Dua Lipa and Young Thug, was released on 27 May. On 29 June 2022, Harris announced that Funk Wav Bounces Vol. 2 would be released on 5 August 2022. The album contains features from Charlie Puth, Swae Lee, Pusha T, Normani, Halsey, Tinashe, and Justin Timberlake, among others. Harris announced the second single, "New Money", which features vocals from 21 Savage. The song was released on 1 July 2022. On 6 July 2022, Harris announced that his third single, "Stay with Me", featuring Halsey, Timberlake, and Pharrell, would be released on 15 July 2022. The fourth single, "New to You", was released on 29 July 2022. It features American singers Normani and Tinashe, and rapper Offset.

In February 2023 Harris and Ellie Goulding teased an upcoming single titled "Miracle" on TikTok. It was released on 10 March 2023. Harris performed at the 22nd Coachella Valley Music and Arts Festival in April 2023. At the Brit Awards 2024, Harris performed "Miracle" alongside Goulding, and received three nominations – British Pop Act, Song of the Year for "Miracle", and won the Brit Award for British Dance Act. On 9 August 2024, Harris released his first compilation album 96 Months, which contains several of Harris's previously released singles that had not previously been included on one of his albums. In May 2025, Harris received copyright infringement accusations from British DJ and producer Chicane, who cited similarities between Harris's new single "Blessings" and his 1996 single "Offshore". Harris was quick to dispute the claims made by Chicane, saying that all he had done was "play two notes over multiple chords", and accused Chicane of copyright himself on "Offshore" by highlighting similarities between it and "Love On A Real Train" by Tangerine Dream.

On 8 February 2026, he performed for the largest attendance for a DJ set by a single artist 1,600,000 people in São Paulo, Brazil certified by Guinness World Records.

In October 2026, Harris announced his first headlining tour in North America initially with 18 shows. Massive demand led to the addition of 16 shows to the tour.

== Musical style ==
Following his professed disinterest in the genre of EDM in late 2016, Harris transitioned to funk on his fifth studio album Funk Wav Bounces Vol. 1 the following year, which he continued with his sixth album Funk Wav Bounces Vol. 2 in 2022.

In 2016 Harris stated that Jamiroquai and Fatboy Slim had inspired him to make music.

== Endorsements ==
In 2008 the artwork of Harris's debut album I Created Disco was featured as part of a multicoloured iPod nano campaign on TV and in print in the US. In 2009, Harris teamed up with Coca-Cola for their 'Open Happiness' advertising campaign in the UK. Harris wrote and produced an exclusive track for the brand called 'Yeah Yeah Yeah, La La La' which was featured on TV, digital, outdoor and on-pack promotional activity and was offered on 'Coke Zone' website for free download. The same year, Harris's song "Colours" was featured in Kia Motors's hamster television advertisement for the Kia Soul EV.

In 2012 Harris was featured in the Pepsi Max commercial for their football campaign. Titled "crowd surfing", the advert showed Harris on the DJ deck playing his single "Let's Go" to the crowd of partygoers alongside star footballers Lionel Messi, Didier Drogba, Fernando Torres, Frank Lampard, Sergio Agüero and Jack Wilshere. In 2013, Harris teamed up with Sol Republic to create their first studio-tuned, professional-calibre headphones. The partnership involved designing a customised look for the headphones and redesigning its drivers to Harris's specifications.

On 17 December 2014 Harris was announced as the new face of Emporio Armani for its men's underwear line for the Spring/Summer 2015 season. He was also named the worldwide testimonial of the Emporio Armani eyewear and watch collection. The black and white campaign was shot in Los Angeles by photographer Boo George. Harris returned as the face of the brand underwear line, eyewear and watch line for their Emporio Armani Fall/Winter 2015/2016 campaign. The images, shot by Lachlan Bailey, were released in July 2015.

== Other ventures ==
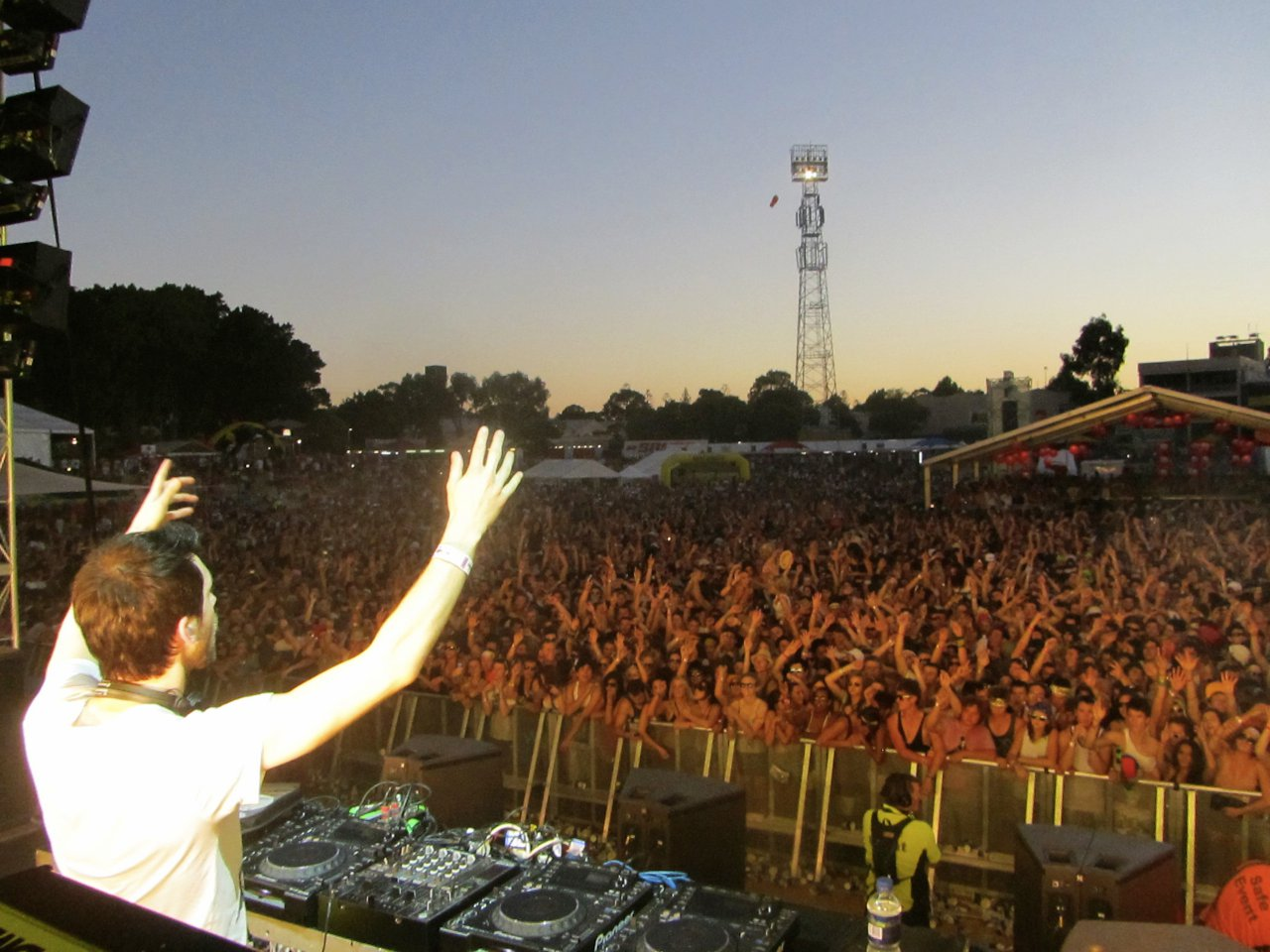
Harris at Perth Stereosonic, 2010

In March 2010 Harris launched his own vanity label, Fly Eye Records. Most of the label's releases belong to the EDM genre. In 2014, the label formed a partnership with Sony/ATV Music Publishing. Later that year, Harris was appointed as the head of the artists and repertoire team at the dance label Deconstruction Records.

In early 2012 Harris signed an exclusive DJ residency deal with Wynn Las Vegas which included gigs at three of the luxury resort's avenues: Encore Beach Club, Surrender and XS Nightclub. In February 2013, Harris signed as the first exclusive resident DJ with the Abu Dhabi-owned hospitality company Hakkasan Group in Las Vegas. The 20-month residency saw him play 46 dates at MGM Grand's Hakkasan nightclub, as well as 22 additional gigs at the MGM Grand's Wet Republic. In January 2015, he extended his partnership with the Hakkasan group for three more years, which includes residencies at three of the group's Las Vegas venues (Hakkasan nightclub, Wet Republic and Omnia Nightclub at Caesars Palace). Harris also serves as the Group's music consultant for its restaurants, nightclubs and hotels.

On 30 March 2015 Harris was announced as a co-owner, along with various other music artists, in the music streaming service Tidal. The service specialises in lossless audio and high definition music videos. Rapper Jay Z acquired the parent company of Tidal, Aspiro, in the first quarter of 2015. Including Beyoncé and Jay Z, 16 artist stakeholders (such as Kanye West, Beyoncé, Madonna, Chris Martin and Nicki Minaj) co-own Tidal, with the majority owning a 3% equity stake. The idea of having a completely artist-owned streaming service was created by those involved to adapt to the increased demand for streaming within the current music industry and to rival other streaming services such as Spotify, which have been criticised for their low payout of royalties.

In February 2024, Harris revealed his plan to quit DJing at the age of 50. After that he will focus on studio work and producing for other artists.

In 2026, ahead of his homecoming shows at Hampden Park, Glasgow, Harris announced the launch of his own haggis brand "Rave Haggis". The product was made up of premium haggis sourced from Stahly Quality Foods and Harris described it as "a tribute to Scottish culture".

== Philanthropy ==
In September 2007 Harris performed in the charity event "Wasted Youth" in aid of the Campaign Against Living Miserably at KOKO nightclub in Camden Town, London. The event aimed to draw attention to the issue of youth suicide among men in the UK and to raise awareness and money for the charity. In 2008, he supported Shelter's campaign "Hometime Scotland" which pledges to end homelessness and bad housing in Scotland. In 2010, Harris performed live in The War Child's post-Brit Awards show (alongside La Roux and Kasabian) which took place at the Shepherd's Bush Empire, London. The event raised funds and public awareness on children affected by violence in war zones.

In February 2012 Harris teamed up with several other artists (including Rihanna and Coldplay) to perform at a charity concert with all proceeds from the show going to the Children's Orthopaedic Center at the Children's Hospital Los Angeles. In November 2012, Harris contributed several songs to Tiësto's compilation album Dance (RED) Save Lives in collaboration with anti-AIDS charity Product Red which was aimed at creating awareness on the fight for an AIDS Free Generation. Harris participated in a global live stream of the Stereosonic music festival in Melbourne which took place on World AIDS Day on 1 December 2012. The proceeds from both the album and the event were donated for the cause.

Following the 2017 Las Vegas shooting, Harris revealed on his Instagram that he donated his fees from his show at Omnia Nightclub to the Las Vegas Victims fund. Later that year, Harris donated $20,000 to DJ Snake charity campaign to benefit the Rohingyas, people living in Myanmar that have consistently been attacked by the Myanmar government and are being pushed out of their home with nowhere to go. The situation in Myanmar has been deemed "beyond critical" by Amnesty International. In July 2020, Harris donated £20,000 for the Save Our Sub campaign to benefit Glasgow's Sub Club which was at risk of permanent closure after temporarily closing doors on March due to the coronavirus pandemic.

== Income ==
Harris is one of the world's highest paid DJs/producers. Forbes began reporting on Harris's earnings in 2013, calculating that he earned $46 million between May 2012 and May 2013, for his music, tour and his residency in Las Vegas which placed him as the highest-paid DJ of the year. In 2014, Harris came in at number one on the list again for the second consecutive year with a total of $66 million in annual earnings. In 2015, Harris topped the highest-paid DJs list for a third consecutive year, having earned $66 million over the previous 12 months. On The Sunday Times Rich List published in April 2015, Harris was ranked the 30th richest British millionaire in music, with a personal fortune of £70 million ($105 million). In 2018, he made $48.5 million.

== Personal life ==
Harris dated British singer Rita Ora from 2013 to June 2014. He started dating American model Aarika Wolf in 2014, after Wolf appeared in the music video for his song "Blame". They broke up in 2015. From March 2015 to June 2016, Harris dated American singer Taylor Swift. He and Wolf reunited in 2017, but the relationship ended in 2022. In January 2022, Harris began dating television presenter Vick Hope. They later married on 9 September 2023. On 30 April 2025, it was announced that Harris and Hope were expecting their first child together. On 4 August, Harris posted on Instagram that he and his wife had welcomed their first child, a son.

Harris stopped drinking alcohol in 2008, stating, "I wasn't an alcoholic or anything like that, but it was clearly affecting what I do." He is a supporter of his hometown football team Queen of the South and Liverpool. Harris considered writing a song to celebrate the former reaching the 2008 Scottish Cup final, but the idea was scrapped due to the time constraints of recording his 2009 album Ready for the Weekend.

== Discography ==
- I Created Disco (2007)
- Ready for the Weekend (2009)
- 18 Months (2012)
- Motion (2014)
- Funk Wav Bounces Vol. 1 (2017)
- Funk Wav Bounces Vol. 2 (2022)

== Concert tours ==
- Groove Armada: Soundboy Rock tour (2007)
- Faithless: To All New Arrivals tour (2007)
- Ready for the Weekend tour (2009–2010)
- Deadmau5 and Skrillex: Unhooked tour (2010)
- Rihanna: Last Girl on Earth (2010–2011)
- Rihanna: Loud Tour (2011)
- Greater Than Tour (with Tiësto), UK and Ireland (2012)
- Calvin Harris: North American Tour (2027)

== Filmography ==
Year	Title	Role	Note	Ref.
2015	Entourage	Himself	Cameo	
