= Over Now (Calvin Harris and the Weeknd song) =

2020 single by Calvin Harris and the Weeknd

Single by Calvin Harris and the Weeknd
- Released: 28 August 2020
- Genre: R&B; funk
- Length: 3:30
- Label: Columbia
- Songwriters: Adam Wiles; Abel Tesfaye; Adam Feeney; Martin McKinney; Dylan Wiggins; William Walsh
- Producers: Calvin Harris; The Weeknd; Frank Dukes

Calvin Harris singles chronology
"Live Without Your Love" (2020)	"Over Now" (2020)	"By Your Side" (2021)

The Weeknd singles chronology
"Save Your Tears" (2020)	"Over Now" (2020)	"Hawái" (remix) (2020)

Music video
- "Over Now" on YouTube

"Over Now" is a song by Scottish DJ and record producer Calvin Harris and Canadian singer-songwriter The Weeknd, released on 28 August 2020 through Sony Music. The song was first teased by the Weeknd in a virtual concert shortly prior to the song's announcement.

== Background ==
The collaboration was teased by the Weeknd on 20 August via an Instagram post in which he posted an old photo of him and Harris having drinks backstage at the Coachella festival. Harris also previewed a "funky", "smooth" R&B track in an Instagram story, which music critics at the time attributed to the Weeknd's falsetto. Both artists then took to social media on 22 August to confirm the song's title and release, alongside various promotional posters. "Over Now" was noted as being the same unreleased song the Weeknd shared on a TikTok live stream prior to the song's announcement. The song marks the first collaboration between the pair and is Harris' first release as Calvin Harris since his January 2019 single "Giant", as he has released 4 EPs and a single, "Live Without Your Love", under his alter-ego Love Regenerator between the releases of "Giant" and "Over Now". The official cover art was revealed on 25 August via the artists' respective social medias.

== Charts ==
Weekly chart performance for "Over Now"
Chart (2020)	Peak position
Australia (ARIA)	17
Belgium (Ultratip Bubbling Under Flanders)	7
Belgium (Ultratop 50 Wallonia)	34
Canada Hot 100 (Billboard)	22
Canada CHR/Top 40 (Billboard)	14
Canada Hot AC (Billboard)	24
Czech Republic Airplay (ČNS IFPI)	63
Denmark (Tracklisten)	31
El Salvador (Monitor Latino)	15
France (SNEP)	124
Germany (GfK)	92
Global 200 (Billboard)	67
Iceland (Tónlistinn)	37
Ireland (IRMA)	26
Netherlands (Dutch Tipparade 40)	2
Netherlands (Single Top 100)	83
New Zealand (Recorded Music NZ)	38
Norway (VG-lista)	24
Panama (PRODUCE)	37
Portugal (AFP)	57
Scottish Singles Sales (Official Charts)	27
Singapore (RIAS)	29
Sweden (Sverigetopplistan)	15
Switzerland (Schweizer Hitparade)	41
UK Singles (Official Charts)	33
US Billboard Hot 100	38
US Adult Pop Airplay (Billboard)	37
US Pop Airplay (Billboard)	25
US R&B/Hip-Hop Airplay (Billboard)	31
US Rhythmic Airplay (Billboard)	13
US Rolling Stone Top 100	17

== Certifications ==
Certifications and sales for "Over Now"
Region	Certification	Certified units/sales
Australia (ARIA)	Gold	35,000^{‡}
Brazil (Pro-Música Brasil)	Platinum	40,000^{‡}
United Kingdom (BPI)	Silver	200,000^{‡}
^{‡} Sales+streaming figures based on certification alone.

== Release history ==
Release dates for "Over Now"
Region	Date	Format	Label	Ref.
Various	28 August 2020	Digital download; streaming	Sony	
Australia	28 August 2020	Contemporary hit radio	Sony; Columbia	
United Kingdom	28 August 2020	Contemporary hit radio	Sony; Columbia	
United States	1 September 2020	Contemporary hit radio	Columbia	
United States	1 September 2020	Rhythmic contemporary	Columbia	
