= Dance wiv Me =

2008 single by Dizzee Rascal

Single by Dizzee Rascal featuring Calvin Harris and Chrome

from the album Tongue n' Cheek and Ready for the Weekend
- Released: 30 June 2008
- Length: 3:25 (radio mix); 4:22 (extended mix)
- Label: Dirtee Stank; Liberation; Fly Eye; Columbia
- Songwriters: Dylan Mills; Adam Wiles; Tyrone Paul; Nick Detnon
- Producer: Calvin Harris

Dizzee Rascal singles chronology
"Flex" (2007)	"Dance wiv Me" (2008)	"Toe Jam" (2008)

Calvin Harris singles chronology
"This Is the Industry" (2008)	"Dance wiv Me" (2008)	"I'm Not Alone" (2009)

Chrome singles chronology
"Dance wiv Me" (2008)	"Holiday" (2009)

"Dance wiv Me" is a single by British rapper Dizzee Rascal from his fourth studio album, Tongue n' Cheek (2009). It was released on 30 June 2008 and features guest vocals from Scottish musician Calvin Harris and British R&B singer Chrome. The extended mix of the song also appears on Harris' second studio album, Ready for the Weekend (2009).

"Dance wiv Me" mixes Rascal's usual grime style with dance music from Harris and R&B from Chrome. Rascal and Harris recorded their respective verse and main hook parts separately, sending their parts back and forth over the phone, while Chrome recorded the pre hook/bridge vocals in the studio with Rascal. The song was produced by Harris, who also sings the chorus. The song debuted in the UK Singles Chart at number one and stayed there for four weeks – making it Rascal's first ever number one. It became the 12th biggest-selling single in the UK in 2008. Rascal, Chrome and Harris performed an impromptu acoustic version of "Dance wiv Me" for the BBC as part of the Glastonbury Festival 2008 coverage. The song was played in an episode on the HBO series, Entourage.

British rock group Keane mashed-up this song with "Another One Bites the Dust" by Queen at Radio 1 Live Lounge as "Another One Bites the Dizzee".

== Writing and recording ==
In December 2007, Calvin Harris announced a new record with Dizzee Rascal. In an interview with Jo Whiley on BBC Radio 1, Rascal explained that the collaboration with Harris came after they had met during Radio 1's Big Weekend in 2007. Rascal told Harris that the latter's single "Acceptable in the 80s" had got him excited about music again and that he would love to make a track with him.

"Dizzee texted me, saying he'd done this a cappella over someone else's music, but his verse was too good for their music, so could he do it with me instead? So I spent a long time on it, to make sure it lived up to his expectations. I sent him the track, and he called me at 2 in the morning to say it was amazing, so I knew it was good." – Calvin Harris on the press release for Ready for the Weekend.

The song's lyrics were written and recorded by Rascal with extra vocals recorded by Chrome. Harris produced the music separately from Rascal and Chrome and later sent the track to Rascal's studio for completion.

"Me and Calvin met and we exchanged numbers. We never actually met once to actually make the tune, we did it back and forth over the phone. It was good, we were just like over the phone, 'What about changing that hook a bit?' Chrome was the only one that came in the studio but it was good working with him because we've done a few things in the past." – Dizzee Rascal in an interview with Newsnight.

== Release and reception ==
"Dance wiv Me" represented a change for Rascal from his grime roots to a more pop-oriented sound. It was first released as a download single in the UK on 30 June 2008 and in physical format one week later. The song was Rascal's first single on his own Dirtee Stank Recordings record label, released after he had split from his former label, XL Recordings, who did not want to release the track themselves.

"Experimenting with dance music is a good way for British rappers to get on the radio and into the charts. Some people might see this as me selling out but no way. Every track I write I try to make different from the last and as my profile has risen with all the festivals and live shows I've done, I've wanted to experiment more." – Dizzee Rascal in the Daily Star

== Chart performance ==
On its first week of release, "Dance wiv Me" debuted at number one on the UK Singles Chart on 12 July 2008, becoming both Dizzee Rascal and Calvin Harris' first number one single in the United Kingdom. It remained top of the chart for four consecutive weeks, and spent ten weeks in total in the top 10. "Dance wiv Me" spent a total of 60 weeks on the UK Singles Chart throughout 2008 and 2009. The song was the UK's 12th highest-selling single of 2008.

== Music video ==
The music video for "Dance wiv Me" depicts Dizzee Rascal and Chrome in a night club with Calvin Harris as the bar man. The video also features Big Brother 14 contestant Gina Rio.

== Track listings ==
- Download single:
1. "Dance Wiv Me" (Radio Mix) – 3:25
- Maxi CD / 12-inch single:
1. "Dance Wiv Me" (Radio Mix) – 3:25
2. "Dance Wiv Me" (Extended Mix) – 4:22
3. "Dance Wiv Me" (Niteryders Remix) – 5:12
4. "Dance Wiv Me" (Agent X Remix) – 4:25
- Download single (live):
1. "Dance Wiv Me" (Live at iTunes Festival) – 3:37
2. "Dance Wiv Me" (Live at Glastonbury) – 4:10
- German single:
1. "Dance Wiv Me" (Radio Edit) – 3:25
2. "Dance Wiv Me" (DJ Frizzo Remix) – 4:04

- US single 1:
1. "Dance Wiv Me" (Radio Edit) – 3:25
2. "Dance Wiv Me" (DJ Rap Remix) – 4:22
3. "Dance Wiv Me" (Dirty Vegas Remix) – 5:12
4. "Dance Wiv Me" (Jason Nevins Remix) – 4:25
- US single 2:
1. "Dance Wiv Me" (Radio Edit) – 3:25
2. "Dance Wiv Me" (Extended Mix) – 4:22
3. "Dance Wiv Me" (Shazam Remix) – 5:44
4. "Dance Wiv Me" (The Aston Shuffle Remix) – 6:14
5. "Dance Wiv Me" (Jason Nevins Extended Mix) – 6:47

== Charts ==
=== Weekly charts ===
Chart (2008–2009)	Peak position
Australia (ARIA)	13
Australian Club Chart (ARIA)	5
Australian Dance (ARIA)	2
Belgium (Ultratop 50 Flanders)	40
Czech Republic Airplay (ČNS IFPI)	39
Europe (Eurochart Hot 100)	3
Germany (GfK)	48
Ireland (IRMA)	5
Scottish Singles Sales (Official Charts)	4
UK Singles (Official Charts)	1
UK Indie (Official Charts)	1
UK Hip Hop/R&B (Official Charts)	1

=== Year-end charts ===
Chart (2008)	Position
Australia (ARIA)	66
Australian Club Chart (ARIA)	34
Australian Dance (ARIA)	11
Europe (Eurochart Hot 100)	73
UK Singles (OCC)	12

Chart (2009)	Position
Australian Dance (ARIA)	27

=== Decade-end charts ===
Chart (2000–2009)	Position
UK Singles (OCC)	79

== Certifications ==
Region	Certification	Certified units/sales
Australia (ARIA)	Platinum	70,000^{‡}
New Zealand (RMNZ)	3× Platinum	90,000^{‡}
United Kingdom (BPI)	3× Platinum	1,800,000^{‡}
^{‡} Sales+streaming figures based on certification alone.
