= I'm Not Alone =

Song by Calvin Harris

Single by Calvin Harris

from the album Ready for the Weekend
- Released: 6 April 2009
- Recorded: December 2008
- Studio: Earth's Core (Glasgow, Scotland)
- Length: 3:31
- Label: Fly Eye; Columbia
- Songwriter: Calvin Harris
- Producer: Calvin Harris

Calvin Harris singles chronology
"Dance wiv Me" (2008)	"I'm Not Alone" (2009)	"Ready for the Weekend" (2009)

Music video
- "I'm Not Alone" on YouTube

"I'm Not Alone" is a song by Scottish musician Calvin Harris, released as the lead single from his second studio album, Ready for the Weekend (2009). The track was first played by Pete Tong on BBC Radio 1 as his "essential new tune" on 23 January 2009 and has been described as a slice of euphoric dance. On 12 April 2009, the song debuted at number one on the UK Singles Chart, earning Harris his first solo number-one single on the chart and second overall following his 2008 collaboration with Dizzee Rascal and Chrome, "Dance wiv Me".

In 2010, Harris received a writing credit on Chris Brown's hit single "Yeah 3x", due to the perceived similarities between the two songs.

== Background and writing ==
"I'm Not Alone" was written, produced and recorded by Harris during songwriting and production sessions for his second studio album Ready for the Weekend (2009). He described the song "a big stadium dance tune, somewhere between Snow Patrol, Faithless and Grandaddy". He said in a publicity release: "The whole track's a light and shade thing, two styles put together. I find it quite hard to write a happy-happy lyric now, for some reason. I don't know why that is, to be honest with you. Maybe it's staying in a room for a huge amount of time on your own, and that's reflected in the lyrics!" Lyrically, Benjamin Kassel commented that the song "forces the listener to confront the painful truths of the life they live", but highlighted that despite this, a sense of comfort and belief is evident throughout the song in reference to its title.

In 2024, the Official Charts Company, the chart compiler in the United Kingdom, placed "I'm Not Alone" as the 19th biggest selling single by Harris, ahead of his collaboration with Alesso and Hurts on the single "Under Control".

The song is written in the key of E minor, and follows a chord progression of Em/D/Am/C.

== Track listings ==
UK CD single

1. "I'm Not Alone" (Radio Edit) – 3:32
2. "I'm Not Alone" (Extended Mix) – 4:28

UK 12-inch single

A1. "I'm Not Alone" (Hervé's See You at the Festival Remix) – 5:33
A2. "I'm Not Alone" (Radio Edit) – 3:32
B1. "I'm Not Alone" (Deadmau5 Remix) – 8:15
B2. "I'm Not Alone" (Extended Mix) – 4:28

UK iTunes single

1. "I'm Not Alone" (Tiësto Remix) – 6:41
2. "I'm Not Alone" (Radio Edit) – 3:32

UK iTunes EP

1. "I'm Not Alone" (Radio Edit) – 3:31
2. "I'm Not Alone" (Extended Mix) – 4:26
3. "I'm Not Alone" (Deadmau5 Mix) – 8:15
4. "I'm Not Alone" (Hervé's See You at the Festival Remix) – 5:33
5. "I'm Not Alone" (Burns Rework) – 6:36

US iTunes EP

1. "I'm Not Alone" (Radio Edit) – 3:31
2. "I'm Not Alone" (Extended Mix) – 4:28
3. "I'm Not Alone" (Tiësto Remix) – 6:41
4. "I'm Not Alone" (Deadmau5 Mix) – 8:15
5. "I'm Not Alone" (Hervé's See You at the Festival Remix) – 5:34
6. "I'm Not Alone" (Hervé's See You at the Dub Parade) – 3:41
7. "I'm Not Alone" (Burns Rework) – 6:36
8. "I'm Not Alone" (Instrumental) – 3:31

== Chart performance ==
"I'm Not Alone" debuted at number one on the UK Singles Chart on 12 April 2009 – for the week ending 18 April 2009 – knocking Lady Gaga's "Poker Face" off the top of the chart. It remained at the top position for two weeks, until it was dethroned by Tinchy Stryder's "Number 1" featuring N-Dubz. On 3 January 2010, "I'm Not Alone" re-entered the chart at number ninety-nine.

In the Republic of Ireland, the single debuted at number fourteen on the Irish Singles Chart on 9 April 2009, peaking at number four by its third week.

== Plagiarism controversy ==
When Chris Brown's 2010 single "Yeah 3x" was released, Harris claimed that "Yeah 3x" plagiarised "I'm Not Alone". He tweeted, "Choked on my cornflakes when I heard [the] new Chris Brown single this morning. Do you know what I mean?" After receiving many abusive messages from Brown's fans after posting the comment, he later tweeted, "I don't care that you call me a nobody. Stealing is still stealing, doesn't matter who you are! ... Because Chris Brown is an international celebrity doesn't make it OK to rip off a guy from [the] UK not many people have heard of."

When asked in an interview with Australia's Herald Sun if Brown knew him, Harris replied, "Well, he's never heard of me, that's the funniest thing. But the producer he's worked with, DJ Frank E, has definitely heard of me. He's a respected producer, he's worked with Tiësto on a few tracks, perhaps that's where the link is. It's all a bit of fun." Brown later spoke with Harris and upon hearing the similarities between the two songs, had Harris' name added to the songwriting credits, with no legal action taken. The two artists reportedly have no hard feelings toward each other since the controversy; Harris even called Brown his "best mate" and said that he enjoys listening to his work.

== Music video ==
Calvin, portrayed as the Frankenstein-like character in the video for "I'm Not Alone"

The music video for "I'm Not Alone" was filmed in Oslo, Norway, on 6 February 2009. It was directed by Christian Holm-Glad. The clip begins with a small boy (potentially meant to represent a young Harris) wandering the woods dragging through the thick snow, pulling a sledge with a toy bear on top. He then sets up camp and lights a fire to keep warm whilst cuddling his toy bear. While wandering further, the bear is dropped from the sledge and is left behind. The scene closes and cuts to a dungeon styled setting that showcases Harris portrayed as a Frankenstein-type character who is seen to perform experiments on numerous female captives, combining their essences to reanimate his "lost" teddy bear.

== Personnel ==
- Calvin Harris – vocals, producer, instrumentation, arranger, engineering, mixing
- Brian Gardner – mastering

== Charts ==
=== Weekly charts ===
Weekly chart performance for "I'm Not Alone"
Chart (2009)	Peak position
Australia (ARIA)	48
Belgium (Ultratop 50 Flanders)	13
Belgium (Ultratop 50 Wallonia)	8
CIS Airplay (TopHit)	95
Czech Republic Airplay (ČNS IFPI)	95
Denmark (Tracklisten)	6
Europe (European Hot 100 Singles)	5
Ireland (IRMA)	4
Italy (Musica e Dischi)	28
Netherlands (Dutch Tipparade 40)	5
Netherlands (Single Top 100)	62
New Zealand (Recorded Music NZ)	40
Scottish Singles Sales (Official Charts)	2
Slovakia Airplay (ČNS IFPI)	84
UK Dance (Official Charts)	1
UK Singles (Official Charts)	1
US Dance/Mix Show Airplay (Billboard)	23

Weekly chart performance for "I'm Not Alone 2019"
Chart (2019)	Peak position
Ireland (IRMA)	69
Scottish Singles Sales (Official Charts)	30
UK Singles (Official Charts)	66
UK Dance (Official Charts)	12
US Dance Club Songs (Billboard)	5
US Hot Dance/Electronic Songs (Billboard)	17

2026 weekly chart performance for "I'm Not Alone 2019"
Chart (2026)	Peak position
US Hot Dance/Electronic Songs (Billboard)	12

=== Year-end charts ===
Year-end chart performance for "I'm Not Alone"
Chart (2009)	Position
Belgium (Ultratop 50 Flanders)	58
Belgium (Ultratop 50 Wallonia)	47
UK Singles (OCC)	23

Year-end chart performance for "I'm Not Alone 2019"
Chart (2019)	Position
US Hot Dance/Electronic Songs (Billboard)	93

== Certifications ==
Certifications for "I'm Not Alone"
Region	Certification	Certified units/sales
Australia (ARIA)	2× Platinum	140,000^{‡}
Denmark (IFPI Danmark)	Gold	15,000^{^}
New Zealand (RMNZ)	Platinum	30,000^{‡}
United Kingdom (BPI)	Platinum	600,000^{‡}
^{^} Shipments figures based on certification alone.^{‡} Sales+streaming figures based on certification alone.

== Release history ==
Release date for "I'm Not Alone"
Country	Date	Label	Format
United Kingdom	6 April 2009	Fly Eye; Columbia	Digital download
United Kingdom	13 April 2009	Fly Eye; Columbia	CD single
United Kingdom	22 April 2009	Fly Eye; Columbia	12" single
United Kingdom	5 April 2019	Columbia	Digital download; streaming

== 2019 re-release ==
"I'm Not Alone 2019"

Single by Calvin Harris

from the EP I'm Not Alone 2019
- Released: 5 April 2019
- Length: 3:21
- Label: Fly Eye; Columbia
- Songwriter: Calvin Harris
- Producer: Calvin Harris

Calvin Harris singles chronology
"Giant" (2019)	"I'm Not Alone 2019" (2019)	"Live Without Your Love" (2020)

Harris re-released the single on 5 April 2019, alongside the I'm Not Alone 2019 EP, featuring the re-released 2019 edit, several new remixes and a remastered version. It was included on his first compilation album, 96 Months (2024).

=== Certifications ===
Certifications for "I'm Not Alone 2019"
Region	Certification	Certified units/sales
United Kingdom (BPI)	Gold	400,000^{‡}
^{‡} Sales+streaming figures based on certification alone.

=== Track listing ===
Digital download

1. "I'm Not Alone" (CamelPhat Remix I) – 4:04
2. "I'm Not Alone" (CamelPhat Remix II) – 6:03
3. "I'm Not Alone" (2019 Edit) – 3:21
4. "I'm Not Alone" (Thomas Schumacher Remix) – 3:41
5. "I'm Not Alone" (2009 Remaster) – 3:36
