= Ready for the Weekend (album) =

2009 studio album by Calvin Harris

Studio album by Calvin Harris
- Released: 14 August 2009
- Recorded: 2008–2009
- Studio: Earth's Core (Glasgow)
- Genres: Dance; dance-pop; electropop; house
- Length: 52:20
- Labels: Fly Eye; Columbia
- Producer: Calvin Harris

Calvin Harris chronology
I Created Disco (2007)	Ready for the Weekend (2009)	18 Months (2012)

Singles from Ready for the Weekend
- 1. "I'm Not Alone" Released: 6 April 2009; 2. "Ready for the Weekend" Released: 9 August 2009; 3. "Flashback" Released: 2 November 2009; 4. "You Used to Hold Me" Released: 8 February 2010

Professional ratings
Aggregate scores
Source	Rating
Metacritic	65/100
Review scores
Source	Rating
AllMusic	3.5/5 stars
The Daily Telegraph	3/5 stars
Dotmusic	7/10
Evening Standard	3/5 stars
The Guardian	2/5 stars
The Independent	2/5 stars
MusicOMH	3/5 stars
NME	7/10
Spin	8/10 stars
Under the Radar	4/10

Ready for the Weekend is the second studio album by Scottish musician Calvin Harris, released on 14 August 2009 by Fly Eye and Columbia Records. It was preceded by the release of two singles – "I'm Not Alone" and "Ready for the Weekend". "I'm Not Alone" became Harris's first solo number one single in the United Kingdom, but his second overall following a collaboration with Dizzee Rascal in 2008. It achieved similar commercial success in other countries, debuting at number two in his native Scotland, four in Ireland, and twenty-three on the Billboard Dance/Mix Show Airplay charts in the United States.

The album debuted at number one in on the albums charts in his native Scotland, as well as in the United Kingdom. It reached number twelve on the Billboard Top Dance Albums, and was further supported by the release of two additional singles – "Flashback" and "You Used to Hold Me".

== Background ==
Harris had been working on the album since the release of his debut album, I Created Disco, with the first tracks being recorded in 2008. In April 2008, Harris stated that the only existing copy of his then-upcoming album was lost when his laptop was misplaced during the baggage handling problems at the opening of London Heathrow Terminal 5. He later stated on the BBC's Glastonbury Festival 2008 coverage that he got his baggage back including the album within a few days. However, Harris ultimately admitted in April 2009 that this was a lie as the album was not in his luggage at all, and that he hoped that what he said would give him more time to finish recording the album. The album track, "Yeah Yeah Yeah La La La", was used in a Coca-Cola advertisement in mid-2009.

Harris described the single "I'm Not Alone" as a "stadium dance tune", with Mike Diver from the BBC praising "its transition from sombre lyric and acoustic strum to massive big beats is complete" and said "it’s easy to visualise thousands of people absolutely losing their minds to it". It became Harris's first number one single in the United Kingdom, and was later certified Platinum by the British Phonographic Industry (BPI) in the United Kingdom, indicating sales in excess of 600,000 copies. It subsequently finished 2009 as the 23rd best selling single of the year in the United Kingdom. It also achieved commercial success in his native Scotland, peaking at number two on the national singles charts, as well as reaching the top ten in Ireland, the Netherlands and Belgium. The albums title track was released as the second single the week prior to the albums release.

In 2009, "I'm Not Alone" was nominated for the Popjustice £20 Music Prize in the Best Contemporary Song category, and in 2010, Ready for the Weekend was nominated for Dance-Pop Album of the Year at the Hungarian Music Awards.

== Singles ==
"I'm Not Alone" was released as the album's lead single on 6 April 2009. The song debuted at number one on the UK Singles Chart, knocking off Lady Gaga's "Poker Face". It spent two weeks atop the chart, before dropping to number three in its third week. "Ready for the Weekend" was released as the album's second single on 9 August 2009. The song peaked at number three in his native Scotland, as well as in the United Kingdom. It reached the top ten in both Ireland and the Netherlands, whilst it peaked at number one on the Dance Singles Charts in the United Kingdom. It was subsequently certified Silver in the United Kingdom for sales in excess of 200,000 copies, whilst in Australia it earned a Gold certification by the Australian Recording Industry Association (ARIA) for sales in excess of 35,000 copies.

"Flashback" was released as the third single from the album on 2 November 2009. It peaked at number two on the UK Dance Singles Charts, number sixteen in his native Scotland, as well as number eighteen on the UK Singles Chart.It also achieved commercial success in Australia, Belgium and Ireland, and was certified Platinum in Australia for sales in excess of 70,000 copies. The album's fourth and final single, "You Used to Hold Me", was released on 8 February 2010, peaking at number twenty-one in Scotland and twenty-seven on the UK Singles Charts. An extended version of Harris's 2008 chart-topping collaboration with Dizzee Rascal, "Dance wiv Me", is also included on the album.

== Critical reception ==
The Metacritic score for the album was 65/100. Several reviewers drew on Harris’ comment that he was intending to make a “stadium dance” album and noted the bigger scale and greater sense of a party crowd atmosphere in Ready for The Weekend compared to Harris's previous album I Created Disco. James McMahon of NME for example referred to the “music-for-the-people philosophy embodied at the core of Harris’ anthem-heavy new record”.

Neil McCormick called the album “big, bold and colourful”, describing how the album’s songs “start out simple and organic” before evolving closer to electronic dance music over the course of the track. McCormick writes about how “The pop genius is in the way these develop and mutate, rather than settling into obvious, dumb grooves”.

== Commercial performance ==
Ready for the Weekend debuted at number one on the UK Albums Chart, selling 36,308 copies in its first week. The album was certified gold by the British Phonographic Industry (BPI) on 16 October 2009, and by November 2014, it had sold 274,786 copies in the United Kingdom. The album was also successful in Ireland, where it peaked at number six on the Irish Albums Chart. In the United States, it reached number 12 on the Dance/Electronic Albums chart and number 22 on the Heatseekers Albums chart. Ready for the Weekend attained moderate success elsewhere, reaching number 39 in Australia, number 74 in Belgium (Wallonia) and number 139 in France.

== Track listing ==
All tracks are written by Calvin Harris, except where noted.

No.	Title	Writer(s)	Length
1.	"The Rain"		4:36
2.	"Ready for the Weekend"		3:37
3.	"Stars Come Out"		4:28
4.	"You Used to Hold Me"		3:51
5.	"Blue"		3:41
6.	"I'm Not Alone"		3:31
7.	"Flashback"		3:49
8.	"Worst Day" (featuring Izza Kizza)	Harris; Izza Kizza	3:46
9.	"Relax"		3:49
10.	"Limits"		3:42
11.	"Burns Night"	Harris; Mark Irving	2:20
12.	"Yeah Yeah Yeah La La La"		3:17
13.	"Dance wiv Me" (Dizzee Rascal featuring Calvin Harris and Chrome)	Dylan Mills; Harris; Nick Detnon; Tyrone Paul	4:24
14.	"5iliconeator"		3:29

iTunes Store bonus tracks
No.	Title	Length
15.	"Greatest Fear"	6:20
16.	"I'm Not Alone" (deadmau5 Mix) (France and US only)	8:15
17.	"Ready for the Weekend" (Fake Blood Remix) (France only)	5:40

Japanese edition bonus tracks
No.	Title	Length
15.	"Ready for the Weekend" (High Contrast Remix)	5:42
16.	"Ready for the Weekend" (Fake Blood Remix)	5:40
17.	"I'm Not Alone" (Tiësto Remix)	6:41
18.	"I'm Not Alone" (☆Taku Takahashi Remix)	5:50

== Personnel ==
Credits adapted from the liner notes of Ready for the Weekend.

- Calvin Harris – production, arrangement, vocals, instruments, design concept
- Snake Davis – saxophone (track 1)
- Mary Pearce – additional vocals (track 2)
- Ayah Marar – additional vocals (tracks 3, 7, 10)
- Izza Kizza – vocals (track 8)
- Mark Irving – guitar (track 11)
- Dizzee Rascal – vocals (track 13)
- Chrome – vocals (track 13)
- Brian "Big Bass" Gardner – mastering
- Matthew Shave – sleeve photography
- Spiros Politis – inside photography
- Steve Stacey – design

== Charts ==
=== Weekly charts ===
Chart (2009)	Peak position
Australian Albums (ARIA)	39
Australian Dance Albums (ARIA)	6
Belgian Alternative Albums (Ultratop Flanders)	47
Belgian Albums (Ultratop Wallonia)	74
European Albums (Billboard)	9
French Albums (SNEP)	139
Irish Albums (IRMA)	6
Scottish Albums (Official Charts)	1
UK Albums (Official Charts)	1
UK Dance Albums (Official Charts)	1
US Top Dance Albums (Billboard)	12
US Heatseekers Albums (Billboard)	22

=== Year-end charts ===
Chart (2009)	Position
Australian Dance Albums (ARIA)	43
UK Albums (OCC)	100

== Certifications ==
Region	Certification	Certified units/sales
Australia (ARIA)	Gold	35,000^{‡}
New Zealand (RMNZ)	Platinum	15,000^{‡}
United Kingdom (BPI)	Platinum	274,786
^{‡} Sales+streaming figures based on certification alone.

== Release history ==
Region	Date	Format	Label	Ref(s)
Australia	14 August 2009	CD; digital download	Sony	
Ireland	14 August 2009	CD; digital download	Fly Eye; Columbia	
United Kingdom	17 August 2009	CD; LP; digital download	Fly Eye; Columbia	
France	17 August 2009	CD	Cinq 7; Wagram	
United States	18 August 2009	Digital download	Ultra	
Japan	26 August 2009	CD; digital download	Sony	
Germany	25 September 2009	CD; digital download	Ministry of Sound	
France	5 October 2009	Digital download	Cinq 7; Wagram	
United States	6 October 2009	CD	Ultra	
France	12 October 2009	LP	Cinq 7; Wagram	
