= Nuh Ready Nuh Ready =

Single by Calvin Harris featuring PartyNextDoor
- Language: English; Jamaican Patois; MTE
- Released: 8 February 2018
- Studio: God's Eyes Studios (Los Angeles, California); JA Recording Studios (Santa Rosa, California)
- Genre: Dancehall
- Length: 3:04
- Label: Sony
- Songwriters: Adam Wiles; Jahron Brathwaite; Shane Lindstrom
- Producer: Calvin Harris

Calvin Harris singles chronology
| "The Weekend (Funk Wav Remix)" (2017) | "Nuh Ready Nuh Ready" (2018) | "One Kiss" (2018) |

PartyNextDoor singles chronology
| "Still Got Time" (2017) | "Nuh Ready Nuh Ready" (2018) | "Loyal" (2019) |

Music video
- "Nuh Ready Nuh Ready on YouTube

"Nuh Ready Nuh Ready" is a song by Scottish DJ and record producer Calvin Harris featuring Canadian singer PartyNextDoor, who co-wrote the song with Harris and Murda Beatz. It was released via Sony Music on 8 February 2018 along with its music video. It was included on Harris' first compilation album, 96 Months (2024).

== Release and promotion ==
Harris first teased the song on 4 February 2018, when he posted a short clip on social media of a billboard in Times Square, showing the date "02.08.18" with a spinning human skull in the background. A website which contains the words "nuh ready" in its address was also revealed, the same cartoon face and parchment paper displayed on Harris' social media banners were featured on the site. The day after, Harris officially announced the single, along with both of its front and back covers, the latter of which lists the song's credits. Harris wrote that the song is "a whole new experience", in response to a fan who asked if it would be a continuation to his previous album, Funk Wav Bounces Vol. 1. He tweeted a few weeks back that he will be "moving on from Funk Wav sound" in 2018. PartyNextDoor debuted the song live at the O2 Brixton Academy in London on 7 February 2018.

Harris spoke about the song with Zane Lowe on his Beats 1 radio show, saying: "I just know his pen, his voice, and his delivery is among the best in the world," said Harris in a statement. "I worked with him on my last album and I was aware that I underused him. I was embarrassed and ashamed." He also revealed that he was unable to learn a lot about PartyNextDoor while working with him. "I thought he was a genius for a few years. The thing is that I feel like now more than ever, if you don't come out acting like a genius then you don't get called a genius. And because he's like, you know, to the outside a very reserved and very like just off limits, you don't know what he is. You don't know what he's like. You just see an image and you hear a voice and you hear his writing in it and it's amazing, but you don't know what it's all about. I didn't really figure him out any more working with him. I just know that his pen and his voice and his delivery is, I think, among the best in the world."

== Critical reception ==
Upon release, "Nuh Ready Nuh Ready" received positive reviews from music critics. According to Billboard's Kat Bein, "Nuh Ready Nuh Ready" is not "a Funk Wav" nor "a shining Rihanna joint". He opined that it manages "a classic '90s-house twist", with "PartyNextDoor playing the modern favorite with an island-tinged accent over a Caribbean-kissed rhythm, while bright horns burst over the dark background beat". Jon Blistein of Rolling Stone wrote: "The dancehall-tinged cut is embellished by skipping percussion, light synth plunks and stray horn riffs." Hugh McIntyre of Fuse found the song distinct from Harris' previous productions, writing: "the tune has a tropical flair to it, and it perfectly blends ideas taken from hip-hop, R&B, and '90s house tracks." He also praised PartyNextDoor for "pulling off his vocals spectacularly" by "fitting his stylized flow perfectly on Harris' beats". He concluded by comparing it to Harris' "power-bangers in the past", pointing out that it "doesn't immediately grab the listener and force them to jump on the dance floor in the same way", but he sees it as "a different kind of hit for the musician". Similarly, Aron A. of HotNewHipHop also noticed the song of being "not like anything that was featured on Calvin's previous album", writing that Harris "dives deeper into reggae and dancehall".

Charles Holmes of MTV News praised PartyNextDoor for "employing his addictive melodies and songwriting skills". Rap-Up felt that the collaboration "allows PND to pull from his Jamaican roots, while Calvin delivers some house influences". Scott T. Sterling of CBS Radio called it "a percolating club track that combines Caribbean-by-way-of-Toronto island vibes with classic U.K. dubstep aesthetics", while Mike Nied of Idolator regarded it as "a buoyant club cut with massive potential", writing that "it boasts a new sonic direction and provides a much-needed update on trop-pop's overplayed productions".

== Music video ==
The accompanying music video was directed by Emil Nava, and it uses special effects throughout. It begins with shots of night-time London from a helicopter, after which PartyNextDoor and several dancers deliver choreography in front of a green screen. Harris makes a brief appearance towards the middle of the visual.

== Credits and personnel ==
Credits adapted from the single's back cover.

- Calvin Harris – songwriting, production, mixing
- PartyNextDoor – songwriting, vocals
- David "Prep" Hughes – recording
- Dave Kutch – mastering

== Charts ==
=== Weekly charts ===
Weekly chart performance for "Nuh Ready Nuh Ready"
| Chart (2018) | Peak position |
|---|---|
| Belgium (Ultratip Bubbling Under Flanders) | 34 |
| Belgium (Ultratip Bubbling Under Wallonia) | 28 |
| Canada Hot 100 (Billboard) | 83 |
| Ireland (IRMA) | 76 |
| Netherlands (Dance Top 30) | 16 |
| Netherlands (Dutch Tipparade 40) | 3 |
| Netherlands (Single Tip) | 13 |
| New Zealand Heatseekers (RMNZ) | 7 |
| Sweden (Sverigetopplistan) | 68 |
| UK Singles (Official Charts) | 48 |
| US Hot Dance/Electronic Songs (Billboard) | 11 |

=== Year-end charts ===
2018 year-end chart performance for "Nuh Ready Nuh Ready"
| Chart (2018) | Position |
|---|---|
| US Hot Dance/Electronic Songs (Billboard) | 95 |

== Release history ==
Release dates for "Nuh Ready Nuh Ready"
| Region | Date | Format | Label | Ref. |
|---|---|---|---|---|
| Various | February 8, 2018 | Digital download | Sony; Columbia | |
| United Kingdom | February 23, 2018 | Contemporary hit radio | Sony; Columbia | |
