= Ready for the Weekend (song) =

2009 single by Calvin Harris

Single by Calvin Harris

from the album Ready for the Weekend
- Released: 9 August 2009
- Studio: Earth's Core (Glasgow, Scotland)
- Length: 3:37
- Label: Fly Eye; Columbia
- Songwriter: Calvin Harris
- Producer: Calvin Harris

Calvin Harris singles chronology
"I'm Not Alone" (2009)	"Ready for the Weekend" (2009)	"Flashback" (2009)

Music video
- "Ready for the Weekend" on YouTube

"Ready for the Weekend" is a song by Scottish musician Calvin Harris. It features uncredited vocals from British singer Mary Pearce. Written and produced by Harris himself, the song was released on 9 August 2009 as the second single from his second studio album of the same name (2009).

== Background and release ==
The song features guest vocals by British singer Mary Pearce, who previously worked as a backing vocalist for Beverley Knight, Lionel Richie and Chaka Khan. Remixes by High Contrast, Fake Blood and Dave Spoon were also announced. It made its world debut on 12 June 2009 with Pete Tong on BBC Radio 1. On 13 July 2009 it was featured as the Song of the Day on Popjustice. Harris performed the song at the iTunes Festival '09 on 18 July 2009 in London.

Commercially, "Ready for the Weekend" reached number one on the United Kingdom Dance Singles Charts, and reached number three on the official singles charts in the country. It finished 2009 as the 98th best selling single of the year in the United Kingdom. In addition to this, the song also peaked at number three in his native Scotland, as well as within the top ten in Belgium, Ireland and the Netherlands. In the United States, it peaked at number fifteen on the Billboard Dance/Mix Show Airplay charts.

It was later certified Silver by the British Phonographic Industry (BPI) in the United Kingdom, indicating sales in excess of 200,000 copies, and certified Gold by the Australian Recording Industry Association (ARIA), indicating sales in excess of 35,000 copies in Australia.

== Music video ==
The music video for the song was directed by Ben Ib and premiered on the British channel T4 on 4 July 2009 at 11:00 am. FHM model Lauren Pope and dancer Funda Önal make an appearance in the video. Several dancing females appear wearing red leotards to match Harris' magic portal, shirt and furniture. They next "change into blue and yellow zip-up bathing suits, expanding the palette and multiplying endlessly, just in time for the weekend."

On 23 July 2009, it was reported that the video was removed from YouTube due to a copyright claim from another party. Harris stated that he was upset it had occurred and believed that the British Phonographic Industry had prompted the removal. On 14 December 2010, the video was re-uploaded on Harris' official channel.

== Track listing ==
=== CD single ===
*;UK CD single and iTunes single
No.	Title	Length
1.	"Ready for the Weekend"	3:37
2.	"Ready for the Weekend" (High Contrast Remix)	5:42

=== iTunes EP ===
*;UK iTunes EP
No.	Title	Length
1.	"Ready for the Weekend"	3:37
2.	"Ready for the Weekend" (Fake Blood Remix)	5:40
3.	"Ready for the Weekend" (High Contrast Remix)	5:42
4.	"Ready for the Weekend" (Dave Spoon Remix)	6:21
5.	"Ready for the Weekend" (Dave Spoon Dub Remix)	6:35

=== UK 12" single ===
*;UK 12" single
No.	Title	Length
1.	"Ready for the Weekend" (Original Version)	3:37
2.	"Ready for the Weekend" (Dave Spoon Remix)	6:21
3.	"Ready for the Weekend" (Fake Blood Remix)	5:40

== Charts ==
=== Weekly charts ===
Weekly chart performance for "Ready for the Weekend"
Chart (2009)	Peak position
Belgium (Ultratip Bubbling Under Flanders)	2
Belgium (Ultratip Bubbling Under Wallonia)	7
CIS Airplay (TopHit)	188
Europe (European Hot 100 Singles)	11
Ireland (IRMA)	9
Netherlands (Dutch Tipparade 40)	10
Scotland Singles (OCC)	3
Slovakia Airplay (ČNS IFPI)	47
UK Singles (OCC)	3
UK Dance (OCC)	1
US Dance/Mix Show Airplay (Billboard)	15

=== Year-end charts ===
Year-end chart performance for "Ready for the Weekend"
Chart (2009)	Position
UK Singles (OCC)	98

== Certifications ==
Sales and certifications for "Ready for the Weekend"
Region	Certification	Certified units/sales
Australia (ARIA)	Gold	35,000^{‡}
United Kingdom (BPI)	Silver	200,000^{^}
^{^} Shipments figures based on certification alone.^{‡} Sales+streaming figures based on certification alone.

== Release history ==
Country	Date	Label	Format
United Kingdom	9 August 2009	Fly Eye; Columbia	Digital download
United Kingdom	10 August 2009	Fly Eye; Columbia	CD single; 12" single
