= Chrom3 =

British singer

Chrome
- Also known as: Chrom3
- Born: Tyrone Emmanuel Paul
- Genres: R&B, rap
- Years active: 2000s–2010s

Tyrone Emmanuel Paul, better known as Chrome (stylised as Chrom3), is a British singer who shot to fame through his vocal contributions to the two Dizzee Rascal UK number-one records, "Holiday" and "Dance wiv Me".

At the end of 2010, Chrome leaked a track entitled "Ooh Now Baby" with a Tron Legacy-inspired video. The song was produced by LP and JC, the producers behind the dance film StreetDance 3D, and featured UK rapper Stylah.

In July 2011, Chrome signed a publishing deal and announced his first official single release would be a track called "Wake Up", which debuted on BBC 1Xtra. The "Wake Up" single was scheduled for release 19 September 2011 and features remixes from Benny Page, David Heartbreak, Stinkahbell and Cutmore.

In 2013, Chrome (now called Chrom3) was featured on the Brookes Brothers song "Carry Me On", which was selected as Zane Lowe's Hottest Record in the World Right Now and charted at #71 on the UK Singles Chart.

== Other contributions ==
Alongside rappers LP, JC, Skibadee, MC Det and Blemish, he contributed to the song "Club Battle" for the soundtrack of StreetDance 3D.
