= Fly Eye Records =

English record label

- Founded: 2010
- Founder: Calvin Harris
- Defunct: 2016
- Status: Inactive
- Genre: Electro house; progressive house; bass house; future house
- Country of origin: United Kingdom
- Location: London, England
- Official website: flyeyerecords.com

Fly Eye Records was a record label founded by Calvin Harris in 2010. The label was first launched in May 2010 with the single "Gecko" from Mr Blink, a DJ who served as Harris' opening act. In 2014, the label formed a partnership with Sony/ATV Music Publishing. Most of the label's releases belong to the EDM genre.

== History ==
In 2010, Harris decided to create his own vanity label and named it "Fly Eye Records" after his signature fly-eye sunglasses that he handcrafted himself, which feature on the cover of his 2009 album, Ready for the Weekend.

The original purpose from the label was to scout other artists that they admire without the contract restrictions of a major label. When Harris established Fly Eye Records he said stating, "My goal for Fly Eye Records is to release the most exciting club music I can get my hands on."

== Artists ==
- Autoerotique
- Bart B More
- Bassjackers
- BURNS
- Calvin Harris (founder)
- DOD
- dBerrie
- Dillon Francis
- East & Young
- Eva Shaw
- Firebeatz
- GTA
- Hard Rock Sofa
- Hy5teria
- Jacob Plant
- James Doman
- Jewelz & Sparks
- Kenneth G
- Massimo Massivi
- Michael Woods
- Mike Hawkins
- Mightyfools
- Mr Blink
- Mync
- Nicky Romero
- Quintino
- R3hab
- Sikdope
- Thomas Gold
- Tommie Sunshine
- TV Noise
- twoloud
- Zen Freeman

== Releases ==
=== Standard releases ===
Year	Artist	Release	Type	Release date	Catalogue
2009	Calvin Harris	I'm Not Alone (Remixes)	EP	23 Mar 2009	Columbia Records
2009	Calvin Harris	I'm Not Alone (Tiësto Remix)	Single	6 May 2009	Columbia Records
2010	Mr Blink	Gecko	Single	3 May 2010	FLYEYE101
2010	Massimo Massivi	Hands Up	Single	29 Nov 2010	FLYEYE102
2011	Calvin Harris	Awooga	Single	21 Mar 2011	FLYEYE103
2011	Tommie Sunshine and Bart B More	Bodywork	Single	1 Aug 2011	FLYEYE104
2011	Calvin Harris	Feel So Close	Single	7 Sep 2011	FLYEYEFSC (As Columbia Records)
2011	Nicky Romero	Camorra	Single	8 Sep 2011	FLYEYE105
2011	BURNS	Iced Out	Single	26 Sep 2011	FLYEYE106
2011	Calvin Harris featuring Kelis	Bounce	Single	5 Oct 2011	FLYEYEB (As Columbia Records)
2011	Michael Woods	Full Access	Single	19 Dec 2011	FLYEYE107
2012	MYNC	Stadium	Single	11 Jun 2012	FLYEYE108
2012	Hard Rock Sofa	Starlight	Single	30 Jul 2012	FLYEYE109
2012	East & Young	Coda	EP	3 Sep 2012	FLYEYE110
2012	BURNS	Domino	Single	8 Oct 2012	FLYEYE111
2012	Dillon Francis	Bootleg Fireworks (Burning Up)	Single	30 Oct 2012	FLYEYE112
2012	Thomas Gold	MIAO	Single	25 Dec 2012	FLYEYE113
2013	Jacob Plant	Shakedown	Single	28 Jan 2013	FLYEYE114
2013	James Doman	The Key	Single	18 Feb 2013	FLYEYE115
2013	Michael Woods	Platinum Chains	Single	11 Mar 2013	FLYEYE116
2013	Firebeatz	YEAHHHH	Single	15 April 2013	FLYEYE117
2013	Jacob Plant	Fire	Single	24 Jun 2013	FLYEYE118
2013	Bassjackers and R3hab	Raise Those Hands	Single	15 Jul 2013	FLYEYE119
2013	GTA	Yolohton	Single	17 Sep 2013	Free Download
2013	GTA	The Crowd	Single	7 Oct 2013	FLYEYE120
2013	Eva Shaw	Charizma	Single	25 Nov 2013	FLYEYE121
2013	GTA	Bola	Single	16 Dec 2013	FLYEYE122
2014	dBerrie and Zen Freeman	Switch	Single	3 Feb 2014	FLYEYE123
2014	Sandro Silva	Throne	Single	3 Mar 2014	FLYEYE124
2014	BURNS	EMOΣ	Single	16 Jun 2014	FLYEYE125
2014	Calvin Harris	C.U.B.A	Single	21 Jul 2014	FLYEYE126
2014	Mightyfools	Shaolin	Single	4 Aug 2014	FLYEYE127
2014	Quintino and Kenneth G	Blowfish	Single	25 Aug 2014	FLYEYE126
2014	BURNS	Flicka	Single	22 Sep 2014	FLYEYE130
2014	Jewelz & Sparks	Motor	Single	6 Oct 2014	FLYEYE128
2014	Calvin Harris and R3hab	Burnin'	Single	29 Oct 2014	FLYEYE132
2014	Calvin Harris and Ummet Ozcan	Overdrive (Part 2)	Single	22 Dec 2014	FLYEYE133
2015	Calvin Harris featuring Ellie Goulding	Outside (Hardwell Remix)	Single	23 Feb 2015	FLYEYEO (As Columbia Records)
2015	Mightyfools and Mike Hawkins	Shots Fired	Single	23 Feb 2015	FLYEYE134
2015	Calvin Harris featuring Haim	Pray to God (Calvin Harris vs. Mike Pickering Hacienda Remix)	Single	9 Mar 2015	FLYEYE138 (As Columbia Records)
2015	Tujamo a Jacob Plant	All Night	Single	9 Mar 2015	FLYEYE135
2015	Jewelz & Sparks	Parade 98	Single	13 Apr 2015	FLYEYE136
2015	Moguai and Joey Beltram vs. Cobra Effect	The Zound (Energy Flash)	Single	4 May 2015	FLYEYE137
2015	TV Noise	Tell Me	Single	1 Jun 2015	FLYEYE139
2015	Jordy Dazz and Cobra Effect	The Limit	Single	20 Jul 2015	FLYEYE140
2015	TV Noise	Tell Me VIP	Single	22 Jul 2015	Free Download
2015	The Hours	See The Light (Calvin Harris Remix)	Single	8 Aug 2015	FLYEYE141
2015	Primal Scream	Uptown (Calvin Harris Remix)	Single	21 Aug 2015	FLYEYE142
2015	Lucky Charmes	Drop That Bass	Single	2 Nov 2015	FLYEYE144
2015	twoloud and Konih	One More	Single	7 Dec 2015	FLYEYE143
2016	Henry Fong x Halfway House featuring Sanjin	F.E.A.R.	Single	8 Feb 2016	FLYEYE146
2016	BURNS	Beauty Queen	Single	22 Feb 2016	FLYEYE147
2016	Sonic One	Punk! (TWOLOUD Remix)	Single	7 Mar 2016	FLYEYE145
2016	Sikdope	Snakes	Single	18 Apr 2016	FLYEYE148
2016	DOD	Honey	Single	23 May 2016	FLYEYE149
2016	Autoerotique and Hunter Siegel	OTF	Single	23 Jun 2016	FLYEYE150
