= Archangel (Kettama album) =

2025 studio album by Kettama

Studio album by Kettama
- Released: 3 October 2025
- Genres: Electronic; house; techno
- Length: 59:13
- Label: Steel City Dance Discs
- Producers: Kettama; Interplanetary Criminal; DJ Heartstring; Fred Again; Prospa; Clouds

Kettama chronology
As You Were (2023)	Archangel (2025)	Archangel (DJ Mix) (2025)

Singles from Archangel
- 1. "Yosemite" Released: 13 December 2024; 2. "It Gets Better (Forever Mix)" Released: 14 March 2025; 3. "Gotta Have It" Released: 30 April 2025; 4. "Air Maxes" Released: 4 July 2025; 5. "If U Want My Heart" Released: 25 July 2025; 6. "Sort It Out" Released: 27 August 2025; 7. "Man with a Second Face" Released: 10 October 2025

Archangel is the debut album by Irish producer and DJ Kettama. It was released on 3 October 2025 through Steel City Dance Discs.

== Background ==
Kettama announced the release of the album alongside its cover art and title through an Instagram post on 27 August 2025. In an interview with Mixmag, the DJ stated that he felt burnt out following the release of his collaboration with Fred Again and Shady Nasty, "Air Maxes", which garnered negative reception online. In the same interview, he stated that he was originally against the idea of an album at first, due to people having harsher opinions on them than EPs.

In an article published by Rolling Stone UK on 3 October 2025, they listed Archangel as one of the "6 albums you need to hear this week".

== Critical reception ==
Professional ratings
Review scores
Source	Rating
Clash	8/10
MusicOMH	3/5 stars

Ben Broyd of Clash lauded Archangel as "a genre-smashing, emotionally rich body of work that cements his status as one of underground music's most vital new voices". Further stating that "the Galway-born artist [Kettama] has taken his time crafting Archangel, and it shows. A decade in the making, the 15-track collection is more than just a debut, it's a defining statement." Billboard author Katie Bain described the album "is as fresh and sophisticated is it danceable."

For MusicOMH, Ben Devlin stated the album is "at its best when the kickdrums are thumping and the synth chords are blaring," singling out "Take Me" as impressive, and "It Gets Better (Forever Mix)" as having "some Underworld-esque lyrics, laddish but a bit artsy and hard to pin down." In the same review, Devlin states that the title track is an underwhelming opener, and that production sounds unfinished in places, and cites "Air Maxes" as "one of the worst songs this reviewer has heard all year." Kade Kleinschmidt of EDM Tunes stated that "as a listening experience, the album reads less like a collection of singles and more like a designed set."

=== Year-end lists ===
Publication	List	Rank	Ref.
EARMILK	Top 50 Albums of 2025	40	
Hot Press	50 Best Albums of 2025	50	

== Track listing ==
Archangel track listing
No.	Title	Writer(s)	Producer(s)	Length
1.	"Archangel" (featuring Sølv)	Evan Campbell; Eloise Keating	Kettama	3:10
2.	"Split in Two Minds" (with Seantommy)	Campbell; Sean Thomas Hodgson	Kettama	2:22
3.	"Yosemite" (with Interplanetary Criminal)	Campbell; Zachary Bruce	Kettama; Interplanetary Criminal	4:26
4.	"Take Me"	Kettama	Kettama	4:25
5.	"Fade Away (It's a Feeling)"	Campbell; Kristy Lee Peters	Kettama	4:38
6.	"Man with a Second Face"	Campbell	Kettama	4:44
7.	"If U Want My Heart" (with DJ Heartstring featuring KLP)	Campbell; Jonas Hellberg; Leonard Hans Victor Brede; Peters	Kettama; DJ Heartstring	3:23
8.	"Do Not Go Gentle"	Campbell	Kettama	3:43
9.	"11th of January"	Campbell	Kettama	4:17
10.	"Air Maxes" (with Fred Again and Shady Nasty)	Campbell; Fred Gibson; Kevin Stathis; Luca Watson; Hadyn Green; Max Richter	Kettama; Fred Again	3:01
11.	"Gotta Have It"	Campbell	Kettama	4:34
12.	"I Believe" (with Prospa)	Campbell; Harvey Blumler; Guiorgi Smith	Kettama; Prospa	4:14
13.	"It Gets Better (Forever Mix)"	Campbell; Maurice Santiago	Kettama	4:12
14.	"Air Maxes (Kettama Mix)" (with Fred again.. and Shady Nasty)	Campbell; Gibson; Stathis; Watson; Green; Richter	Kettama; Fred again..	3:33
15.	"Sort It Out" (with Clouds)	Campbell; Calum MacLeod; Liam Robertson	Kettama; Clouds	4:31
Total length:				59:13

=== Notes ===
- "Yosemite" samples vocals by Delline Bass from Reflekt's "Need to Feel Loved"
- "Fade Away (It's a Feeling)" features vocals by KLP.
- "It Gets Better (Forever Mix)" samples "Damaged" by Plummet, and features vocals by Maurice Santiago.

== Personnel ==
Musicians

- Kettama – keyboards (tracks 1–2, 4–15), composing (1–2, 6–7, 10, 14), songwriting (3–6, 8–9, 11–13, 15), synthesizer (3), synthesizer programming (3), drum programming (11, 13)
- Eloise "Sølv" Keating – vocals (track 1), songwriting (1)
- Sean Thomas "seantommy" Hodgson – vocals (track 2), songwriting (2)
- Interplanetary Criminal – songwriting (track 3), synthesizer (3), synthesizer programming (3)
- KLP – vocals (tracks 5, 7), songwriting (5, 7)
- DJ Heartstring – keyboards (track 7), composing (7)
- Shady Nasty – vocals (track 10), songwriting (10)
- Fred Again – keyboards (tracks 10, 14), composing (10, 14)
- Prospa – keyboards (track 12), songwriting (12)
- Maurice Santiago – vocals (track 13), songwriting (13)
- Clouds – keyboards (track 15), songwriting (15)

Technical

- Kettama – production (all tracks)
- Interplanetary Criminal – production (track 3)
- DJ Heartstring – production (track 7)
- Fred Again – production (tracks 10, 14)
- Prospa – production (track 12)
- Clouds – production (track 15)
- Beau Thomas – mastering (all tracks)

== Charts ==
Chart performance for Archangel
Chart (2025)	Peak position
Australian Albums (ARIA)	10
Belgian Albums (Ultratop Flanders)	37
Dutch Albums (Album Top 100)	31
Irish Albums (Official Charts)	6
Irish Independent Albums (IRMA)	1
Scottish Albums (Official Charts)	6
UK Albums (Official Charts)	43
UK Dance Albums (Official Charts)	1
UK Independent Albums (Official Charts)	6

== Release history ==
Release dates and formats for Archangel
Region	Date	Format(s)	Label	Ref.
Various	3 October 2025	CD; digital download; LP; streaming	Steel City Dance Discs	

== DJ mix album ==
Archangel (DJ Mix)

Remix album by Kettama
- Released: 17 October 2025
- Genres: Electronic; house; techno
- Label: Steel City Dance Discs

Kettama chronology
Archangel (2025)	Archangel (DJ Mix) (2025)

A DJ mix of the album was later released on 17 October 2025, featuring songs by other DJs, as well as tracks from the original album.

=== Track listing ===
Archangel (DJ Mix) tracklist
No.	Title	Length
1.	"It Gets Better (Chris Stussy Remix) [Mixed]"	5:57
2.	"Air Drums (Mixed)"	3:24
3.	"Yosemite (Philip George Remix) [Mixed]"	4:57
4.	"Everytime (Mixed)"	5:06
5.	"I Believe (Mixed)"	4:44
6.	"What Are You Waiting For (Mixed)"	4:33
7.	"Tribute To Dilla (Mixed)"	4:01
8.	"Desire To Stay (Mixed)"	4:55
9.	"Sakura (Mixed)"	4:04
10.	"Take Me (Mixed)"	4:08
11.	"If U Want My Heart (featuring KLP) [Mixed]"	4:02
12.	"Man With a Second Face (Mixed)"	4:16
13.	"Yosemite (Mixed)"	2:14
14.	"Sort It Out (Mixed)"	4:16
