= Yosemite (Kettama and Interplanetary Criminal song) =

2024 song by Kettama and Interplanetary Criminal

Single by Kettama and Interplanetary Criminal

from the album Archangel
- Released: 13 December 2024
- Length: 4:26
- Label: Steel City Dance Discs
- Songwriters: Kettama; Interplanetary Criminal
- Producers: Kettama; Interplanetary Criminal

Kettama singles chronology
"The Miracle Makers" (2024)	"Yosemite" (2024)	"It Gets Better (Forever Mix)" (2025)

Interplanetary Criminal singles chronology
"Damager" (2024)	"Yosemite" (2024)	"Slow Burner" (2025)

Music video
- "Yosemite" on YouTube

"Yosemite" is a song by Irish DJ Kettama and British DJ Interplanetary Criminal. The song was released for digital download and streaming by Steel City Dance Discs on 13 December 2024, as the lead single from Kettama's debut studio album, Archangel (2025).

== Background and release ==
The song was written and produced by both DJs during an impromptu studio session between them in Los Angeles whilst they were touring in the states. It samples vocals from English singer Delline Bass on Reflekt's debut single "Need to Feel Loved" (2005).

The pair would tease the song for several months during DJ sets, before surprise releasing it on 13 December 2024. An accompanying music video was released on the same day, directed by Australian cinematographer Joey Knox.

== Track listing ==
- Digital download and streaming – Wilkinson Remix
1. "Yosemite" (Wilkinson Remix) – 4:04
- Digital download and streaming – Philip George Remix
1. "Yosemite" (Philip George Remix) – 4:35

== Credits and personnel ==
Credits adapted from Apple Music.

- Kettama – production, songwriting, synthesizer, synthesizer programming
- Interplanetary Criminal – production, songwriting, synthesizer, synthesizer programming

== Charts ==
Chart performance for "Yosemite"
Chart (2024–2026)	Peak position
Australia Dance (ARIA)	15
Ireland (IRMA)	39
New Zealand Hot Singles (RMNZ)	7
UK Singles Downloads (Official Charts)	50
UK Singles Sales (OCC)	52

Chart performance for "Yosemite (Wilkinson Remix)"
Chart (2025)	Peak position
New Zealand Hot Singles (RMNZ)	7

== Certifications ==
Certifications for "Yosemite"
Region	Certification	Certified units/sales
New Zealand (RMNZ)	Gold	15,000^{‡}
United Kingdom (BPI)	Silver	200,000^{‡}
^{‡} Sales+streaming figures based on certification alone.

== Release history ==
Region	Date	Format	Label	Ref.
Various	13 December 2024	Digital download; streaming	Steel City Dance Discs	
