= List of Billboard number-one dance songs of 2024 =

Billboard magazine compiled the top-performing dance songs in the United States during 2021 on the Hot Dance/Electronic Songs and the Dance/Mix Show Airplay. First published as the Hot Dance Radio Airplay in 2003, the Dance/Mix Show Airplay ranked songs based on airplay detections on dance radio, as well as mix-show plays on top 40 radio and select rhythmic radio as measured by Mediabase. Premiered in 2013, the Hot Dance/Electronic Songs is a multi-metric chart ranking songs based on streaming, sales, and airplay audience impressions from radio stations of all formats.

== Chart history ==
Chart history
Issue date	Hot Dance/Electronic Songs			Dance/Mix Show Airplay		
Issue date	Song	Artist(s)	Ref.	Song	Artist(s)	Ref.
January 6	"Houdini"	Dua Lipa		"Strangers"	Kenya Grace	
January 13	"Houdini"	Dua Lipa		"Body Moving"	Eliza Rose starring Calvin Harris	
January 20	"Houdini"	Dua Lipa		"Body Moving"	Eliza Rose starring Calvin Harris	
January 27	"Yes, And?"	Ariana Grande		"Body Moving"	Eliza Rose starring Calvin Harris	
February 3	"Yes, And?"	Ariana Grande		"Body Moving"	Eliza Rose starring Calvin Harris	
February 10	"Yes, And?"	Ariana Grande		"Water"	Tyla	
February 17	"Yes, And?"	Ariana Grande		"Water"	Tyla	
February 24	"Houdini"	Dua Lipa		"Water"	Tyla	
March 2	"Yes, And?"	Ariana Grande		"Houdini"	Dua Lipa	
March 9	"Houdini"	Dua Lipa		"Houdini"	Dua Lipa	
March 16	"Houdini"	Dua Lipa		"Water"	Tyla	
March 23	"Yes, And?"	Ariana Grande		"Houdini"	Dua Lipa	
March 30	"Houdini"	Dua Lipa		"Houdini"	Dua Lipa	
April 6	"Houdini"	Dua Lipa		"I'm Only Here for the Beat"	Madelline	
April 13	"Houdini"	Dua Lipa		"Happier"	The Blessed Madonna featuring Clementine Douglas	
April 20	"Houdini"	Dua Lipa		"Cutting Loose"	Disco Lines, J. Worra and Anabel Englund	
April 27	"Illusion"	Dua Lipa		"Never Be Alone"	Becky Hill and Sonny Fodera	
May 4	"Houdini"	Dua Lipa		"Make You Mine"	Madison Beer	
May 11	"Illusion"	Dua Lipa		"Make You Mine"	Madison Beer	
May 18	"Miles on It"	Marshmello and Kane Brown		"Lovers in a Past Life"	Calvin Harris and Rag'n'Bone Man	
May 25	"Miles on It"	Marshmello and Kane Brown		"Make You Mine"	Madison Beer	
June 1	"Miles on It"	Marshmello and Kane Brown		"Addicted"	Zerb, The Chainsmokers and Ink	
June 8	"Miles on It"	Marshmello and Kane Brown		"Addicted"	Zerb, The Chainsmokers and Ink	
June 15	"Miles on It"	Marshmello and Kane Brown		"Addicted"	Zerb, The Chainsmokers and Ink	
June 22	"Miles on It"	Marshmello and Kane Brown		"Heaven or Not"	Diplo and Riva Starr featuring Kareen Lomax	
June 29	"Miles on It"	Marshmello and Kane Brown		"I Don't Wanna Wait"	David Guetta and OneRepublic	
July 6	"Miles on It"	Marshmello and Kane Brown		"I Don't Wanna Wait"	David Guetta and OneRepublic	
July 13	"Miles on It"	Marshmello and Kane Brown		"Illusion"	Dua Lipa	
July 20	"Miles on It"	Marshmello and Kane Brown		"Illusion"	Dua Lipa	
July 27	"Miles on It"	Marshmello and Kane Brown		"Illusion"	Dua Lipa	
August 3	"Miles on It"	Marshmello and Kane Brown		"Illusion"	Dua Lipa	
August 10	"Miles on It"	Marshmello and Kane Brown		"Illusion"	Dua Lipa	
August 17	"Guess"	Charli XCX featuring Billie Eilish		"I Go Dance"	Kiesza	
August 24	"Miles on It"	Marshmello and Kane Brown		"I Go Dance"	Kiesza	
August 31	"Miles on It"	Marshmello and Kane Brown		"Heat"	Tove Lo and SG Lewis	
September 7	"Miles on It"	Marshmello and Kane Brown		"In the Dark"	Armin van Buuren and David Guetta featuring Aldae	
September 14	"Miles on It"	Marshmello and Kane Brown		"360"	Charli XCX	
September 21	"Miles on It"	Marshmello and Kane Brown		"360"	Charli XCX	
September 28	"Miles on It"	Marshmello and Kane Brown		"360"	Charli XCX	
October 5	"Miles on It"	Marshmello and Kane Brown		"Music Is Better"	Rüfüs Du Sol	
October 12	"Miles on It"	Marshmello and Kane Brown		"Free"	Calvin Harris and Ellie Goulding	
October 19	"Miles on It"	Marshmello and Kane Brown		"Free"	Calvin Harris and Ellie Goulding	
October 26	"Miles on It"	Marshmello and Kane Brown		"Free"	Calvin Harris and Ellie Goulding	
November 2	"Miles on It"	Marshmello and Kane Brown		"Never Going Home Tonight"	David Guetta and Alesso featuring Madison Love	
November 9	"Miles on It"	Marshmello and Kane Brown		"Wrong Way"	Two Friends and Alexander Stewart	
November 16	"Miles on It"	Marshmello and Kane Brown		"I'm the Drama"	Bebe Rexha	
November 23	"Miles on It"	Marshmello and Kane Brown		"Hot Honey"	Tiësto and Alana Springsteen	
November 30	"Miles on It"	Marshmello and Kane Brown		"Don't Lie"	The Chainsmokers and Kim Petras	
December 7	"Miles on It"	Marshmello and Kane Brown		"Tears Don't Fall"	Kaskade and Enisa	
December 14	"Miles on It"	Marshmello and Kane Brown		"Another World"	Meduza and HAYLA	
December 21	"Miles on It"	Marshmello and Kane Brown		"Lights Camera Action"	Kylie Minogue	
December 28	"Miles on It"	Marshmello and Kane Brown		"Get Busy"	Anabel Englund	

== See also ==
- 2024 in American music
- List of Billboard Hot 100 number ones of 2024
