= It Gets Better (Forever Mix) =

2025 song by Kettama

Single by Kettama

from the album Archangel
- Released: 14 March 2025
- Genre: Electronic; house
- Length: 4:12
- Label: Steel City Dance Discs
- Songwriters: Kettama; Maurice Santiago
- Producer: Kettama

Kettama singles chronology
"Yosemite" (2024)	"It Gets Better (Forever Mix)" (2025)	"Gotta Have It" (2025)

Music video
- "It Gets Better (Forever Mix)" on YouTube

"It Gets Better (Forever Mix)" is a song by Irish producer and DJ Kettama. The song was released for digital download and streaming by Steel City Dance Discs on 14 March 2025, as the second single from his debut studio album, Archangel (2025).

== Background ==
The song samples the 2003 club version of Plumb's "Damaged" by American trance duo Plummet, and features additional vocals by Australian producer and songwriter Maurice Santiago.

A remix by Dutch DJ and producer Chris Stussy was later released on 17 October 2025.

== Credits and personnel ==
Credits adapted from Apple Music.

- Kettama – production, songwriting
- Maurice Santiago – vocals, songwriting

== Release history ==
Region	Date	Format	Label	Ref.
Various	14 March 2025	Digital download; streaming	Steel City Dance Discs	

== Charts ==
Chart performance for "It Gets Better (Forever Mix)"
Chart (2025)	Peak position
Australia Dance (ARIA)	9
Ireland (IRMA)	37
Irish Homegrown (IRMA)	3
New Zealand Hot Singles (RMNZ)	22
UK Dance (Official Charts)	33
UK Indie Breakers (OCC)	10

== Certifications ==
Certifications for "It Gets Better (Forever Mix)"
Region	Certification	Certified units/sales
Australia (ARIA)	Gold	35,000^{‡}
New Zealand (RMNZ)	Gold	15,000^{‡}
United Kingdom (BPI)	Silver	200,000^{‡}
^{‡} Sales+streaming figures based on certification alone.
