= Pavilion Festival =

Music festival in Ayr, Scotland

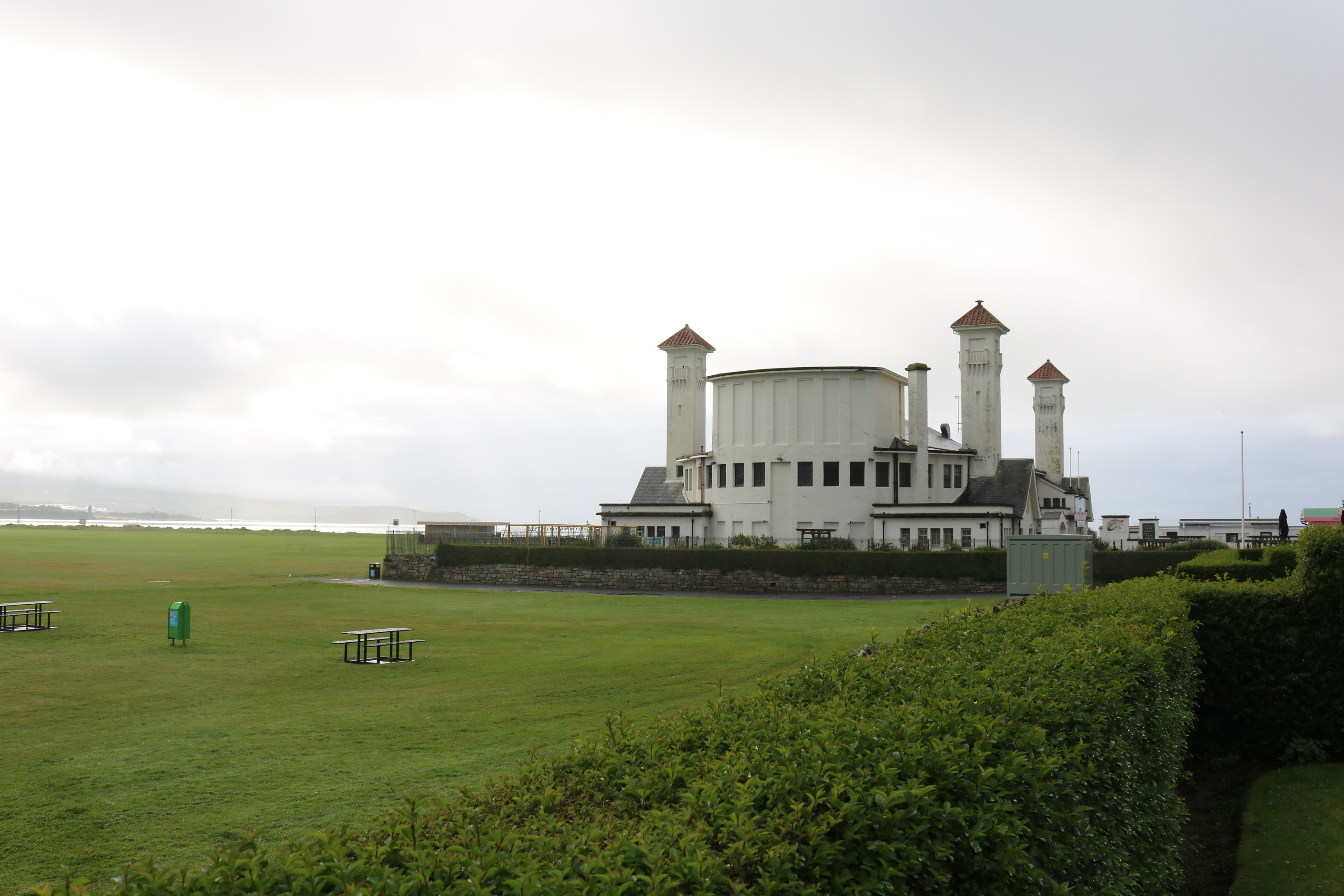
- The Low Green, Ayr, with the Ayr Pavilion in the background
- Genre: Electronic dance music
- Frequency: Annually
- Locations: Ayr, Scotland
- Years active: 2023–present
- Inaugurated: 29 April 2023; 3 years ago
- Founder: Ewan McVicar
- Most recent: 2 May 2026; 6 months ago
- Attendance: 15,000 (2026)

Pavilion Festival is an annual electronic dance music festival held in Ayr, Scotland. It was co-founded by Ayr-born DJ Ewan McVicar and dance music promoter STREETrave. It has been held at the Low Green, on the Ayr beach esplanade, since 2023.

== History ==
Pavilion Festival was first announced by McVicar in November 2022. The festival is named after the Ayr Pavilion, a former entertainment venue which housed the nightclub Hangar 13. STREETrave is a dance music promoter founded by Ricky Magowan in 1989. It staged its first club night at the Ayr Pavilion in 1989 and later went on to hold Hogmanay raves at Prestwick Airport in the early 1990s, including one featuring The Prodigy.

The festival was first held in April 2023, with around 7,500 attendees on the Saturday. The Sunday event was branded separately as the STREETrave Festival. By 2024, the Saturday and Sunday events were billed together as "Pavilion Festival," with the Sunday specifically billed as "Pavilion Festival presents STREETrave". The 2023 festival was featured in the BBC Scotland documentary Back Tae Ayr, which followed McVicar's journey organising the festival. In May 2023, it was announced that a contract had been signed to hold the festival for another five years.

The festival has featured multiple stages and has included attractions such as a "rave cave" and a 33 m (108 ft) Ferris wheel.

In 2025, the festival expanded to three days for the first time, running from 2–4 May. The main stage, named "Electric Brae" after the nearby gravity hill, was housed in a 5,000-capacity marquee. The 2026 festival returned to a two-day format, held on 2–3 May.

=== Notable performers ===
- 2023:
  - Saturday: Ewan McVicar, Skream, Kettama, Optimo (Espacio)
  - Sunday: Soul II Soul, Inner City, Roger Sanchez, D:Ream, Utah Saints, Altern-8, K-Klass, SL2
- 2024:
  - Saturday: Ewan McVicar, Patrick Topping, Derrick Carter, Optimo (Espacio)
  - Sunday: David Morales, 808 State, Heather Small, Technotronic, Black Box, Altern-8, Shades of Rhythm, K-Klass
- 2025:
  - Friday: James, Starsailor
  - Saturday: Ewan McVicar, Annie Mac, Ben Hemsley, DJ Seinfeld, Robert Hood, Optimo (Espacio), Jon DaSilva
  - Sunday: Happy Mondays
- 2026:
  - Saturday: Ewan McVicar, MK, Leftfield, Optimo (Espacio)
  - Sunday: Carl Cox, Sasha, John Digweed, Roger Sanchez
