= 96 Months =

2024 compilation album by Calvin Harris

Compilation album by Calvin Harris
- Released: 9 August 2024
- Recorded: 2015–2024
- Length: 55:48
- Labels: Columbia; Sony UK
- Producers: Calvin Harris; Disciples; Kuk Harrell; Burns; Andrew Watt

Calvin Harris chronology
Funk Wav Bounces Vol. 2 (2022)	96 Months (2024)

Singles from 96 Months
- 1. "Free" Released: 26 July 2024

96 Months is the first compilation album by Scottish record producer and DJ Calvin Harris. It was released on 9 August 2024 through Columbia Records and Sony Music UK. The album is composed of various previously released singles, released between 2015 and 2024, that were not included on an album, as well as a brand new track and lead single, "Free". The album is a sequel to 18 Months (2012), which was Harris' first album to heavily feature guest vocalists. It also contains appearances from Ellie Goulding, Disciples, Rihanna, Dua Lipa, Sam Smith, Jessie Reyez, Rag'n'Bone Man, PartyNextDoor, Eliza Rose, Steve Lacy, Riva Starr, Sananda Maitreya, and Tom Grennan. The album follows his sixth studio album, Funk Wav Bounces Vol. 2 (2022).

== Background ==
Harris first teased the project on 7 August 2024, after posting the album's artwork on his social media accounts, and it was released two days later. The album contains all previously released singles that Harris had not featured on an album, except "Hype" and "Over Now". The album also features three singles that were released under Harris' Love Regenerator alias.

The album features songs released by Harris over the previous nine years prior to its release. Cameron Sunkel from EDM Magazine compared the album as "a victory lap" for Harris, and said that the album doesn't "shy away from showcasing Harris' knack for crafting anthems that resonate with millions".

== Track listing ==
All tracks are produced by Calvin Harris, except where noted.

96 Months track listing
No.	Title	Writer(s)	Producer(s)	Length
1.	"Free" (with Ellie Goulding)	Adam Wiles; Theo Hutchcraft; Chenai Zinyuku		3:32
2.	"How Deep Is Your Love" (with Disciples; 2015)	Wiles; Nathan Duvall; Gavin Koolmon; Luke McDermott; Ina Wroldsen; Marvin White	Harris; Disciples	3:32
3.	"This Is What You Came For" (with Rihanna; 2016)	Wiles; Nils Sjöberg	Harris; Kuk Harrell	3:42
4.	"My Way" (2016)	Wiles		3:39
5.	"One Kiss" (with Dua Lipa; 2018)	Wiles; Dua Lipa; Jessie Reyez		3:34
6.	"Promises" (with Sam Smith; 2018)	Wiles; Sam Smith; Reyez		3:33
7.	"Giant" (with Rag'n'Bone Man; 2019)	Wiles; Rory Graham; Jamie Hartman; Troy Miller		3:49
8.	"I'm Not Alone 2019" (2019)	Wiles		3:21
9.	"Miracle" (with Ellie Goulding; 2023)	Wiles; Goulding; Matthew Burns; Pablo Bowman; Peter Rycroft	Harris; Burns	3:06
10.	"Desire" (with Sam Smith; 2023)	Wiles; Burns; Smith; Sam Roman	Harris; Burns	2:59
11.	"Hypnagogic (I Can't Wait)" (as Love Regenerator; 2020)	Wiles		3:13
12.	"Lovers in a Past Life" (with Rag'n'Bone Man; 2024)	Wiles; Andrew Watt; Graham; Cleo Tighe; Jon Green	Harris; Watt	2:40
13.	"Nuh Ready Nuh Ready" (featuring PartyNextDoor; 2018)	Wiles; Jahron Brathwaite		3:04
14.	"Body Moving" (with Eliza Rose; 2023)	Wiles; Eliza Rose; Reyez		2:36
15.	"Live Without Your Love" (as Love Regenerator with Steve Lacy; 2020)	Wiles; Steve Lacy		3:25
16.	"Lonely" (as Love Regenerator with Riva Starr featuring Sananda Maitreya; 2022)	Wiles; Riva Starr; Sananda Maitreya	Harris; Starr	2:50
17.	"By Your Side" (featuring Tom Grennan; 2021)	Wiles; Tom Grennan; Jamie Scott; John Newman; Jeongyeon; Jihyo; Chaeyoung; Hutchcraft; Mike Needle		3:10
Total length:				55:48

== Personnel ==
- Calvin Harris – production, writing, vocals (4, 8)
- Ellie Goulding – vocals (1, 9), writing (9)
- Theo Hutchcraft – writing (1, 17)
- Chenai Zinyuku – writing (1)
- Disciples – production, writing (2)
- Ina Wroldsen – uncredited vocals, writing (2)
- Marvin White – writing (2)
- Rihanna – vocals (3)
- Taylor Swift (credited as Nils Sjöberg) – uncredited background vocals, writing (3)
- Kuk Harrell – additional production, writing (3)
- Dua Lipa – vocals, writing (5)
- Jessie Reyez – uncredited vocals (6), writing (5, 6, 14)
- Sam Smith – vocals, writing (6, 10)
- Jamie Hartman – writing (7)
- Troy Miller – writing (7)
- Rag'n'Bone Man – vocals, writing (7, 12)
- Burns – additional production, writing (9, 10)
- Pablo Bowman – writing (9)
- Peter Rycroft – writing (9)
- Sam Roman – writing (10)
- Cleo Tighe – writing (12)
- Jon Green – writing (12)
- PartyNextDoor – vocals, writing (13)
- Eliza Rose – vocals, writing (14)
- Steve Lacy – vocals, writing (15)
- Riva Starr – production, writing (16)
- Sananda Maitreya – vocals, writing (16)
- Tom Grennan – vocals, writing (17)
- Jamie Scott – writing (17)
- John Newman – writing (17)
- Mike Needle – writing (17)

== Charts ==
=== Weekly charts ===
Weekly chart performance for 96 Months
Chart (2024–2026)	Peak position
Australian Albums (ARIA)	30
Belgian Albums (Ultratop Flanders)	69
Belgian Albums (Ultratop Wallonia)	111
Canadian Albums (Billboard)	56
Dutch Albums (Album Top 100)	89
French Albums (SNEP)	31
Irish Albums (Official Charts)	6
Italian Albums (FIMI)	74
Lithuanian Albums (AGATA)	28
New Zealand Albums (RMNZ)	16
Norwegian Albums (VG-lista)	18
Polish Albums (ZPAV)	69
Portuguese Albums (AFP)	17
Scottish Albums (Official Charts)	38
Spanish Albums (Promusicae)	72
Swiss Albums (Schweizer Hitparade)	20
UK Albums (Official Charts)	11
UK Dance Albums (Official Charts)	1
US Top Dance Albums (Billboard)	3

=== Year-end charts ===
2024 year-end chart performance for 96 Months
Chart (2024)	Position
Australian Dance Albums (ARIA)	4

2025 year-end chart performance for 96 Months
Chart (2025)	Position
Australian Albums (ARIA)	45
Belgian Albums (Ultratop Flanders)	178
French Albums (SNEP)	124
New Zealand Albums (RMNZ)	24
UK Albums (OCC)	33
US Top Dance Albums (Billboard)	10

== Certifications ==
Certifications for 96 Months
Region	Certification	Certified units/sales
France (SNEP)	Gold	50,000^{‡}
Italy (FIMI)	Gold	25,000^{‡}
New Zealand (RMNZ)	Platinum	15,000^{‡}
Poland (ZPAV)	2× Platinum	60,000^{‡}
Portugal (AFP)	Gold	3,500^{‡}
United Kingdom (BPI)	Platinum	300,000^{‡}
^{‡} Sales+streaming figures based on certification alone.
