= Comes and Goes =

Comes and Goes may refer to:

- "Comes and Goes" (song), a 2026 song by Kettama
- Comes and Goes (album), a 2009 album by Default
