= If U Want My Heart =

2025 song by Kettama and DJ Heartstring featuring KLP

Single by Kettama and DJ Heartstring featuring KLP

from the album Archangel
- Released: 25 July 2025
- Genre: Hard house; techno
- Length: 3:23
- Label: Steel City Dance Discs
- Songwriters: Evan Campbell; Jonas Hellberg; Leonard Hans Victor Brede; Kristy Lee Peters
- Producers: Kettama; DJ Heartstring

Kettama singles chronology
"Air Maxes" (2025)	"If U Want My Heart" (2025)	"Sort It Out" (2025)

DJ Heartstring singles chronology
"Back to My Love" (2025)	"If U Want My Heart" (2025)

KLP singles chronology
"Cherry" (2025)	"If U Want My Heart" (2025)	"Running" (2025)

Official visualiser
- "If U Want My Heart" on YouTube

"If U Want My Heart" is a song by Irish DJ Kettama and German DJ duo DJ Heartstring, featuring Australian singer-songwriter KLP. The song was released for digital download and streaming by Steel City Dance Discs on 25 July 2025, as the fifth single from Kettama's debut studio album, Archangel (2025).

== Credits and personnel ==
Credits adapted from Apple Music.

- Kettama – production, composing, electric piano
- DJ Heartstring – production, composing, piano
- KLP – vocals, songwriting

== Charts ==
Chart performance for "If U Want My Heart"
Chart (2025)	Peak position
New Zealand Hot Singles (RMNZ)	36

== Release history ==
Region	Date	Format	Label	Ref.
Various	25 July 2025	Digital download; streaming	Steel City Dance Discs	
