= Sentimental Ultra =

2026 studio album by DJ Heartstring

Studio album by DJ Heartstring
- Released: 13 November 2026
- Length: 52:10
- Label: Steel City Dance Discs
- Producers: Baugruppe90; DJ Heartstring; Sam Gellaitry; David Jackson; JamesJamesJames; Spriitzz; Swim

DJ Heartstring chronology
Forever (2025)	Sentimental Ultra (2026)

Singles from Sentimental Ultra
- 1. "What Music Felt Like in 2007" Released: 12 March 2026; 2. "A Thousand Lies" Released: 15 May 2026; 3. "Another Year Alone (I Love You)" Released: 7 August 2026; 4. "So Many Things to Say" Released: 4 September 2026; 5. "Sentimental Ultra" Released: 3 October 2026

Sentimental Ultra is the debut album by the German DJ and production duo DJ Heartstring. It was released on 13 November 2026 through Steel City Dance Discs.

== Background ==
On 30 September 2026, DJ Heartstring teased an announcement via Instagram, and later announced that their debut album titled Sentimental Ultra would be released through Steel Dance City Discs on 13 November 2026.

== Track listing ==
Sentimental Ultra track listing
No.	Title	Writer(s)	Producer(s)	Length
1.	"Heartcore (Dreams Become Reality)"	Leonard Brede; Jonas Hellberg; Hamish Lefevre	DJ Heartstring; Swim^{[c]}	1:44
2.	"What Music Felt Like in 2007" (with Baugruppe90)	Brede; Hellberg; Louis Köhler; Paul Vogler	DJ Heartstring; Baugruppe90	3:55
3.	"Sentimental Ultra" (with Spriitzz)	Brede; Hellberg; Sam Harper; Niall Healy; Andrew Tyler	DJ Heartstring; Spriitzz	3:12
4.	"You've Been on My Mind"	Brede; Hellberg; Neave Applebaum; Charlotte Boyle	DJ Hearstring	3:35
5.	"3AM/4AM" (with Monk, 3ndles5, and Crazymike)	Brede; Hellberg; Michael Hassett; Mitchell Toldman; Sascha Witte	DJ Heartstring	3:13
6.	"Oxytocin" (with David Jackson and Lotusgirl3000)	Brede; Hellberg; David Jackson; Melodie Wagner	DJ Heartstring; Jackson	2:59
7.	"In2me" (with Swim)	Brede; Hellberg; James Ivey; Lefevre	DJ Heartstring; JamesJamesJames; Swim	3:40
8.	"Supersonic Pleasure"	Brede; Hellberg; Nya Phillips; Carson Rammelt; Max Vernon	DJ Heartstring	3:48
9.	"Another Year Alone (I Love You)"	Van McCann	DJ Heartstring	3:34
10.	"Where There's Light, There's Hope"	Brede; Hellberg; Jan Hammele; Harper; Andreas Huber	DJ Heartstring	3:49
11.	"So Many Things to Say" (with Sam Gellaitry)	Brede; Hellberg; Sam Gellaitry	DJ Heartstring; Gellaitry; Jackson	2:59
12.	"A Thousand Lies" (with DMA's and Saidah)	Brede; Hellberg; Saidah; Maurice Santiago	DJ Heartstring	4:43
13.	"Healing"	Brede; Hellberg; Camden Cox; Lily McKenzie	DJ Heartstring; Jackson	2:13
14.	"All That's Left Behind" (with KennyHoopla)	Brede; Hellberg	DJ Heartstring	4:20
15.	"Now We Are Strangers" (with Secret Act)	Brede; Hellberg	DJ Heartstring	4:26
Total length:				52:10

=== Note ===
- ^{^[c]} indicates a co-producer

== Charts ==
Chart performance for Sentimental Ultra
Chart (2026)	Peak position
Australian Albums (ARIA)	17
Irish Independent Albums (IRMA)	32
Scottish Albums (Official Charts)	51
UK Dance Albums (Official Charts)	5
UK Independent Albums (Official Charts)	49
UK Record Store (Official Charts)	19

== Release history ==
Release dates and formats for Sentimental Ultra
Region	Date	Format(s)	Label	Ref.
Various	13 November 2026	CD; digital download; LP; streaming	Steel City Dance Discs	
