= Comes and Goes (song) =

Single by Kettama
- Released: 20 May 2026
- Genre: House
- Length: 4:22
- Label: Steel City Dance Discs
- Songwriters: Evan Campbell; Maurice Santiago
- Producer: Kettama

Kettama singles chronology
"Hardstyle 2" (2025)	"Comes and Goes" (2026)	"Pumpin" (2026)

Music video
- "Comes and Goes" on YouTube

"Comes and Goes" is a song by Irish producer and DJ Kettama, released on 20 May 2026 through Steel City Dance Discs. The song became his highest-charting release in several territories, reaching number 14 on US Hot Dance/Electronic Songs, number 54 on the UK Singles Chart and number 19 on the Irish Singles Chart. A remix by Dom Dolla was released on 17 July 2026.

== Composition ==
"Comes and Goes" is composed in the key of E♭ minor with a tempo of 134 beats per minute. It was written by Maurice Santiago and Kettama, who also produced the song and played keyboards. Santiago provides vocals on "Comes and Goes" and previously sang on Kettama's 2025 song "It Gets Better (Forever Mix)". An energetic house track, "Comes and Goes" contrasts a dark, low bassline and rolling drums with an atmospheric arrangement of synths, strings and pads. The extended version has a length of 7:13.

== Critical reception ==
Carl Smith of Official Charts listed "Comes and Goes" as a contender for the 2026 song of the summer, describing it as a "euphoric, rave-ready romp". A reviewer for Hot Press appreciated the "thoughtfully layered" arrangement and called it "the perfect tune to move your feet to late at night, certain to wake you up after a long day of partying."

== Charts ==
Chart performance
Chart (2026)	Peak position
Australia (ARIA)	85
Australia Dance (ARIA)	9
Ireland (IRMA)	19
New Zealand Hot Singles (RMNZ)	4
UK Singles (Official Charts)	54
UK Dance (Official Charts)	11
UK Indie (Official Charts)	16
US Hot Dance/Electronic Songs (Billboard)	14

== Release history ==
Release formats and dates for "Comes and Goes"
Region	Date	Format	Version	Label	Ref.
Various	20 May 2026	Digital download; streaming	Original	Steel City Dance Discs	
Various	12 June 2026	Digital download; streaming	Extended	Steel City Dance Discs	
Various	17 July 2026	Digital download; streaming	Dom Dolla remix	Steel City Dance Discs	
