= Sort It Out (song) =

2025 song by Kettama and Clouds

Single by Kettama and Clouds

from the album Archangel
- Released: 27 August 2025
- Length: 4:31
- Label: Steel City Dance Discs
- Songwriters: Evan Campbell; Calum MacLeod; Liam Robertson
- Producers: Kettama; Clouds

Kettama singles chronology
"If U Want My Heart" (2025)	"Sort It Out" (2025)	"Man with a Second Face" (2025)

Clouds singles chronology
"Cyan" (2025)	"Sort It Out" (2025)	"Horizon" (2025)

Official audio
- "Sort It Out" on YouTube

"Sort It Out" is a song by Irish DJ Kettama and Scottish DJ duo Clouds. The song was released for digital download and streaming by Steel City Dance Discs on 27 August 2025, as the sixth single from Kettama's debut studio album, Archangel (2025).

== Credits and personnel ==
Credits adapted from Apple Music.

- Kettama – production, songwriting, keyboards
- Liam Robertson (Clouds) – production, songwriting, keyboards
- Calum MacLeod (Clouds) – production, songwriting, keyboards

== Charts ==
Chart performance for "Sort It Out"
Chart (2025)	Peak position
Irish Homegrown (IRMA)	7
New Zealand Hot Singles (RMNZ)	27

== Release history ==
Region	Date	Format	Label	Ref.
Various	27 August 2025	Digital download; streaming	Steel City Dance Discs	
