= Ewan McVicar =

Scottish DJ and music producer

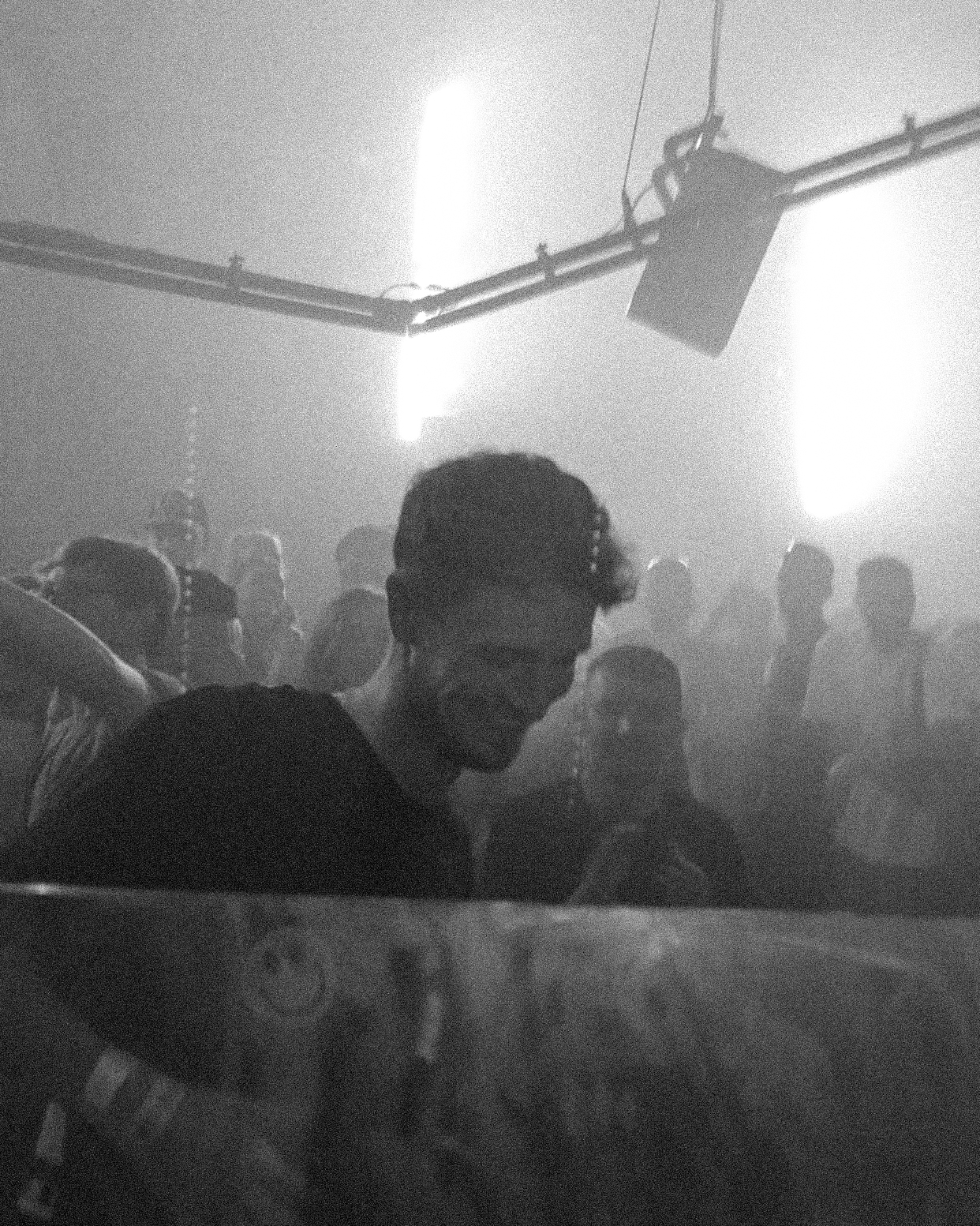

Background information
- Born: 10 January 1994 (age 32); Irvine, Ayrshire, Scotland
- Origin: Ayr, Ayrshire, Scotland
- Genres: House; Detroit Techno
- Occupations: DJ; music producer
- Labels: Optimo Music Digital Danceforce; Trick
- Website: ewanmcvicar.co.uk

Ewan McVicar (born 10 January 1994) is a Scottish DJ and music producer. He came to prominence with the release of his debut single "Tell Me Something Good" in 2021.

== Career ==
On 1 May 2020, McVicar released his EP Street Rave. In 2021, his version of "Tell Me Something Good" reached the top 20 of the UK Singles Chart and was certified Silver by the British Phonographic Industry (BPI), to be following by Gold in 2022 and Platinum in 2023. In February 2022, McVicar released his EP Movin' On Over.

McVicar is the co-founder of Pavilion Festival, alongside dance music promoter STREETrave. The festival has been held annually at Ayr's Low Green since 2023 and has featured acts such as MK, Carl Cox and Happy Mondays.

== Personal life ==
McVicar is from Ayr, Scotland. He grew up in Kincaidston. He studied at Belmont Academy and graduated in teaching from University of the West of Scotland (UWS). He is a fan of Scottish Premiership side St Mirren and often wears their kits whilst performing.

On 30 July 2024, McVicar announced via Instagram that he and girlfriend Aimei Melvin were expecting their first child together. On 8 November 2024, the couple announced that they were engaged. They would announce the birth of their son on 12 December that same year.

== Discography ==
=== Releases ===
Title	Additional Artist(s)	Released	Label	Release	Release type
U - 10		29 May 2017	N/A	U - 10	Single
90's House Jam		19 September 2017	N/A	90's House Jam	Single
Cellar Door	Roose	26 October 2017	TEN Recordings	Cellar Door	Single
&Soul		30 January 2018	N/A	&Soul	Single
The Realm		15 June 2018	N/A	The Realm	Single
Fortitude		15 June 2018	N/A	Fortitude	Single
Carpe Diem		15 June 2018	N/A	Carpe Diem	Single
Groove On (Mrs M)		15 June 2018	N/A	Groove On (Mrs M)	Single
Fisteva		15 June 2018	N/A	Fisteva	Single
Coma		3 January 2019	DistroKid	Coma	Single
Data Format		3 January 2019	DistroKid	Data Format	Single
Been a Long Time		19 April 2019	DistroKid	Been a Long Time	Single
Everybody Be Somebody		19 April 2019	DistroKid	Been a Long Time	Single
Lose Ya Mind	Sam Akers	19 March 2020	DistroKid	Lose Ya Mind	Single
Street Rave		1 May 2020	Trick	Street Rave	EP
Dorian		1 May 2020	Trick	Street Rave	EP
The Gaffer feat. Roose		1 May 2020	Trick	Street Rave	EP
Street Rave (Edit)		1 May 2020	Trick	Street Rave	EP
Love Trip		18 December 2020	Nervous Records	Love Trip / Hi Land Funk	Single
Hi Land Funk		18 December 2020	Nervous Records	Love Trip / Hi Land Funk	Single
Amnocairn		23 April 2021	Shall Not Fade LTD	Amnocairn	EP
1001 Freestyle		23 April 2021	Shall Not Fade LTD	Amnocairn	EP
Ha Mez		23 April 2021	Shall Not Fade LTD	Amnocairn	EP
Stu Boy		23 April 2021	Shall Not Fade LTD	Amnocairn	EP
Delta		25 June 2021	Trick	Delta	Single
Delta (Extended Mix)		25 June 2021	Trick	Delta	Single
Tell Me Something Good		25 June 2021	Trick Under Exclusive License to Ministry of Sound Recordings	Tell Me Something Good	Single
Tell Me Something Good (Extended Mix)		25 June 2021	Trick Under Exclusive License to Ministry of Sound Recordings	Tell Me Something Good	Single
Punch the Wall		6 August 2021	Dance Trax	Punch the Wall	EP
Ecosse		6 August 2021	Dance Trax	Punch the Wall	EP
The Zulu Bop		6 August 2021	Dance Trax	Punch the Wall	EP
Punch the Wall (MAREAM Remix)	MAREAM	6 August 2021	Dance Trax	Punch the Wall	EP
Punch the Wall (Elisa Bee Remix)	Elisa Bee	6 August 2021	Dance Trax	Punch the Wall	EP
The Rhythm (feat. Trinere)	Trinere	10 September 2021	Nervous Records	The Rhythm (feat. Trinere)	Single
Back Tae Ayr		19 November 2021	KOOKOO Records	Back Tae Ayr	Single
Plain Outta Luck		19 November 2021	KOOKOO Records	Back Tae Ayr	Single
Movin' On Over		11 February 2022	Optimo Music Digital Danceforce	Movin' On Over	EP
Showing Up the Freak		11 February 2022	Optimo Music Digital Danceforce	Movin' On Over	EP
Showing Up the Freak (Ikonika Remix)	Ikonika	11 February 2022	Optimo Music Digital Danceforce	Movin' On Over	EP
Which Way to Go?		11 February 2022	Optimo Music Digital Danceforce	Movin' On Over	EP
El Bombo		30 March 2022	Higher Ground	El Bombo	Single
Hammertime		30 March 2022	Higher Ground	El Bombo	Single
Heather Park		8 July 2022	Technicolour	Heather Park	Single
The Nucienda		8 July 2022	Technicolour	Heather Park	Single
Sleepwell	Big Miz	28 October 2022	Miz Records	The Bothy Code	EP
Why Can We No Just Love Each Other?		27 January 2023	N/A	Why Can We No Just Love Each Other?	Single
Groove Thang		21 July 2023	Under Exclusive License to Ministry of Sound Recordings	Groove Thang	Single
Groove Thang (McVicar's House Dub)		29 September 2023	Under Exclusive License to Ministry of Sound Recordings	Groove Thang (McVicar's House Dub)	Single
Rozelle		24 November 2023	HERAS	Rozelle	Single
Abrasive Route		24 November 2023	HERAS	Rozelle	Single
Northern Rhythm	Patrick Topping	17 May 2024	Ministry of Sound Recordings	Northern Rhythm	Single
The Miracle Makers	Kettama	26 July 2024	Ewan McVicar Music and G Town Records Under Exclusive License to Sony Music	The Miracle Makers	Single
The Miracle Makers (Edit)	Kettama	26 July 2024	Ewan McVicar Music and G Town Records Under Exclusive License to Sony Music	The Miracle Makers	Single
BRB		12 August 2024	N/A	Boiler Room 2K22	Album
Leeds On Sunday		12 August 2024	N/A	Boiler Room 2K22	Album
Bells Of N.Y. (Ewan McVicar 'Break It Down' Mix)	Slo Moshun	12 August 2024	N/A	Boiler Room 2K22	Album
Peaches		12 August 2024	N/A	Boiler Room 2K22	Album
Acid Shuffle		12 August 2024	N/A	Boiler Room 2K22	Album
Do U Just Luv?		12 August 2024	N/A	Boiler Room 2K22	Album
Take Me Tae The Floor		12 August 2024	N/A	Boiler Room 2K22	Album
Someone Like U		12 August 2024	N/A	Boiler Room 2K22	Album
String 4 Nite (138 BPM Mix)		12 August 2024	N/A	Boiler Room 2K22	Album
Sincere (Ewan McVicar Edit)	MJ Cole	12 August 2024	N/A	Boiler Room 2K22	Album
Super Sharp Shooter		12 August 2024	N/A	Boiler Room 2K22	Album
Bring It Back		2 October 2024	Slacker 85	Bring It Back	Single
Heather Park (salute Remix)	salute	21 January 2025	Technicolour	Heather Park (salute Remix)	Single
Northern Rhythm (Extended)	Patrick Topping	7 February 2025	Under Exclusive License to Ministry of Sound Recordings	Northern Rhythm (Extended)	Single
Careless Drifter		16 May 2025	Phantasy Sound	Careless Drifter / Basic Instruction	EP
Basic Foundation		16 May 2025	Phantasy Sound	Careless Drifter / Basic Instruction	EP
D.A.S Track		TBA	TBA	TBA	TBA
Take Me Away	Kettama	TBA	TBA	TBA	TBA
Our Revival	Inaya Day	29 August 2025	Three Six Zero Recordings		Single

=== Remixes ===
Remixes
Title	Original Artist(s)	Released	Label	Release	Release type
Bones (Ewan McVicar Remix)	Twenty Committee, Chloe Rodgers	21 August 2020	Crowds and Power Music Group	Bones (Ewan McVicar Remix)	Single
Red Hot Chilli Steppa (Ewan Mcvicar Remix)	Karl Jordan	11 September 2020	Takeout	Red Hot Chilli Steppa (Ewan Mcvicar Remix)	Single
Red Hot Chilli Steppa (Ewan Mcvicar Extended Remix)	Karl Jordan	11 September 2020	Takeout	Red Hot Chilli Steppa (Ewan Mcvicar Remix)	Single
So Emotional (Ewan McVicar's 12 Inch Kiss Re - Edit)	Whitney Houston	6 November 2020	N/A	So Emotional (Ewan McVicar's 12 Inch Kiss Re - Edit)	Single
Check It (Ewan McVicar 'Organ' Mix)	Mura (Br)	5 February 2021	Trick	Check It	EP
Passion 2021 (Ewan McVicar 'New Era' Mix)	Amen UK	20 August 2021	Central Station Records	Passion 2021 (Ewan McVicar 'New Era' Mix)	Single
Gabriel (Ewan McVicar's House Tribe Dub)	Joe Goddard, Valentina	6 May 2022	Greco-Roman	Gabriel (Ewan McVicar's House Tribe Dub)	Single
I See You Baby (Ewan McVicar's Spacehouse Remix)	Groove Armada, Gramma Funk	24 August 2022	Ministry of Pies Under Exclusive License to BMG Rights Management (UK)	I See You Baby (Ewan McVicar's Spacehouse Remix)	Single
Bells of New York 2022 (Break It Down Mix)	Slo Moshun	11 November 2022	Network Records	Bells of New York 2022	EP
Ripgroove (Ewan McVicar 'Drop For 34 Knots Mix')	Double 99, Top Cat	18 November 2022	Deluxe Records Ltd	Ripgroove (25th Anniversary)	Album
Sound & Rhythm (Ewan McVicar Remix)	Totally Enormous Extinct Dinosaurs	24 February 2023	Nice Age Music	Sound & Rhythm (Ewan McVicar Remix)	Single
No Reason (Ewan McVicar '1994' Remix)	The Chemical Brothers	12 May 2023	EMI / Virgin Records	No Reason (Ewan McVicar '1994' Remix)	Single
Energy (feat. DRAMA) [Ewan McVicar '05 Remix]	NEIL FRANCES	20 March 2024	NEIL FRANCES Under Exclusive License to Nettwerk Music Group	Energy (feat. DRAMA) [Ewan McVicar '05 Remix]	Single
Full Way Round (Ewan McVicar Remix)	Leftfield, Grian Chatten	1 November 2024	Virgin Music Group	Full Way Round (Ewan McVicar Remix)	EP
Full Way Round (Ewan McVicar Extended Remix)	Leftfield, Grian Chatten	1 November 2024	Virgin Music Group	Full Way Round (Ewan McVicar Remix)	EP
