= Gotta Have It (Kettama song) =

2025 song by Kettama

Single by Kettama

from the album Archangel
- Released: 30 April 2025
- Length: 4:24
- Label: Steel City Dance Discs
- Songwriter: Evan Campbell
- Producer: Kettama

Kettama singles chronology
"It Gets Better (Forever Mix)" (2025)	"Gotta Have It" (2025)	"Air Maxes" (2025)

Official video
- "Gotta Have It" on YouTube

"Gotta Have It" is a song by Irish producer and DJ Kettama. The song was released for digital download and streaming by Steel City Dance Discs on 30 April 2025, as the third single from his debut studio album, Archangel (2025).

== Credits and personnel ==
Credits adapted from Apple Music.

- Kettama – production, songwriting, keyboards, drum programming

== Charts ==
Chart performance for "Gotta Have It"
Chart (2025)	Peak position
Irish Homegrown (IRMA)	18

== Release history ==
Region	Date	Format	Label	Ref.
Various	30 April 2025	Digital download; streaming	Steel City Dance Discs	
