= Trek (album) =

Studio album by Shady Nasty
- Released: 21 February 2025
- Genre: Post-punk
- Length: 21:21
- Label: Self-released

Singles from Shady Nasty
- 1. "G-SHOCK" Released: 30 June 2023; 2. "HARDSTYLE" Released: 11 October 2023; 3. "CAREDBRAH" Released: 28 November 2024; 4. "SCREWDRIVA" Released: 29 January 2025

Trek (stylised in all caps) is the debut album by Australian music group Shady Nasty. The group self-released the album on 21 February 2025.

== Background ==
The album was announced by the group via an Instagram post on 28 November 2024. The album cover was shot in the backyard of member Kevin Stathis' family home in Campsie, New South Wales.

The album was heavily produced by Kim Moyes from The Presets. Describing the album, Moyes stated that "[Shady Nasty] hold a unique place in Sydney and have built something they can truly claim as their own."

== Track listing ==
Trek track listing
No.	Title	Writer(s)	Producer(s)	Length
1.	"G-SHOCK"	Green; Stathis; Watson	Kim Moyes	2:11
2.	"HARDSTYLE"	Green; Stathis; Watson	Clayton Segelov	3:28
3.	"HESITANCE"	Green; Stathis; Watson	Kim Moyes	2:54
4.	"SCREWDRIVA"	Green; Stathis; Watson	Kim Moyes	3:02
5.	"AE86"	Green; Stathis; Watson	Kim Moyes	1:35
6.	"I.D.W.L."	Green; Stathis; Watson	Kim Moyes	2:31
7.	"CAREDBRAH"	Green; Stathis; Watson	Kim Moyes	3:04
8.	"2008"	Green; Stathis; Watson	Kim Moyes	2:36
Total length:				21:21

== Personnel ==
Shady Nasty

- Kevin Stathis – vocals (all tracks), guitar (all tracks), songwriting (all tracks)
- Haydn Green – bass (all tracks), songwriting (all tracks)
- Luca Watson – drums (all tracks), songwriting (all tracks)

Technical

- Kim Moyes – production (tracks 1, 3–8)
- Clayton Segelov – production (track 2), engineer (2)

== Release history ==
Release dates and formats for Trek
Region	Date	Format(s)	Label	Ref.
Various	21 February 2025	CD; digital download; LP; streaming	Self-released	
