= Shady Nasty =

- Origin: Sydney, Australia
- Years active: 2015-present
- Labels: PIAS Australia
- Members: Kevin Stathis; Haydn Green; Luca Watson
- Website: shadynasty.online

Shady Nasty are an Australian music group formed in Sydney in 2015.

== Biography ==
The group consists of Kevin Stathis (vocals, guitar), Haydn Green (bass), and Luca Watson (drums), who met whilst attending the same high school playing jazz together. Stathis coined the name of the group when he was 18, taking inspiration from a drifting team.

The trio released their debut single "Jewellery" on 31 May 2018, which would later be part of their debut EP Bad Posture released on 21 February 2020. In a review published for No Wave, writer Andrew O'Keefe described the EP "feels like a bodily experience; one which strongly emphasises tone, power and rich production."

Shady Nasty would self-release their debut album TREK on 21 February 2025, with production from Kim Moyes from The Presets. Describing the album, Moyes stated that "[Shady Nasty] hold a unique place in Sydney and have built something they can truly claim as their own." The following month, the group were the support act for British band Shame at The Metro Theatre in Sydney.

In May 2025, DJ and producer Fred Again.. gave the trio a shoutout on his Twitch stream whilst playing their single "SCREWDRIVA," stating that they were "literally [his] favourite band in the world right now" after being introduced to them by fellow DJ Kettama. The group would then release a collaboration with the two DJs in July 2025, titled "Air Maxes," which went on to be featured on Kettama's debut album Archangel.

== Discography ==
=== Studio albums ===
Title	Details
TREK	Released: 21 February 2025; Formats: CD, digital download, LP, streaming; Label: Self-released

=== Extended plays ===
Title	Details
Bad Posture	Released: 21 February 2020; Formats: digital download, streaming; Label: Inertia Music
CLUBSMOKE	Released: 8 October 2021; Formats: digital download, streaming; Label: PIAS Australia

=== Charted singles ===
Title	Year	Peak chart positions	Album
Title	Year	NZ Hot	Album
"Air Maxes" (with Kettama and Fred again..)	2025	13	Archangel

== Awards and nominations ==
=== NSW Music Prize ===
The NSW Music Prize aims to "celebrate, support and incentivise" the NSW's most talented artists, with "the aim of inspiring the next generations of stars". It commenced in 2025.

Year	Nominee / work	Award	Result	Ref.
2025	Trek	NSW Music Prize	Nominated	
2025	NSW Breakthrough Artist of the Year	Shady Nasty	Nominated	
