= Lovers in a Past Life =

Single by Calvin Harris and Rag'n'Bone Man
- Released: 16 February 2024
- Recorded: 2023
- Length: 2:40
- Label: Sony Music
- Songwriters: Adam Wiles; Rory Graham; Cleo Tighe; Jon Green; Andrew Watt
- Producers: Calvin Harris; Andrew Watt

Calvin Harris singles chronology
| "Body Moving" (2023) | "Lovers in a Past Life" (2024) | "Free" (2024) |

Rag'n'Bone Man singles chronology
| "Circles" (2022) | "Lovers in a Past Life" (2024) |

Music video
- "Lovers in a Past Life" on YouTube

"Lovers in a Past Life" is a song by Scottish DJ Calvin Harris and English singer Rag'n'Bone Man. It was released as a single on 16 February 2024 through Sony Music and included on Harris' first compilation album, 96 Months (2024). The song was written by the artists with Andrew Watt, Cleo Tighe and Jon Green, with Harris and Watt producing the song.

== Personnel ==
- Calvin Harris – keyboards, piano, synthesisers, sequencers, rhythm guitar, drum programming, Pro Tools DAW, songwriting, production, mixing, vocal production
- Rag'n'Bone Man – lead and backing vocals, songwriting, composer
- Andrew Watt – lead slide guitar solo, additional keyboard programming, songwriting, production

== Charts ==
=== Weekly charts ===
Weekly chart performance for "Lovers in a Past Life"
| Chart (2024–2025) | Peak position |
|---|---|
| Belarus Airplay (TopHit) | 1 |
| Belgium (Ultratop 50 Flanders) | 30 |
| Belgium (Ultratop 50 Wallonia) | 42 |
| Bulgaria Airplay (PROPHON) | 7 |
| CIS Airplay (TopHit) | 4 |
| Czech Republic Airplay (ČNS IFPI) | 14 |
| Estonia Airplay (TopHit) | 10 |
| France Airplay (SNEP) | 48 |
| Hungary (Dance Top 40) | 13 |
| Hungary (Editors' Choice Top 40) | 3 |
| Iceland (Tónlistinn) | 28 |
| Ireland (IRMA) | 30 |
| Kazakhstan Airplay (TopHit) | 8 |
| Latvia Airplay (LaIPA) | 1 |
| Lithuania Airplay (TopHit) | 6 |
| Moldova Airplay (TopHit) | 34 |
| Netherlands (Dutch Top 40) | 27 |
| Netherlands (Single Top 100) | 81 |
| New Zealand Hot Singles (RMNZ) | 11 |
| Poland (Polish Airplay Top 100) | 10 |
| Romania Airplay (TopHit) | 58 |
| Russia Airplay (TopHit) | 2 |
| San Marino Airplay (SMRTV Top 50) | 16 |
| Serbia Airplay (Radiomonitor) | 3 |
| Slovakia Airplay (ČNS IFPI) | 50 |
| Sweden Heatseeker (Sverigetopplistan) | 9 |
| Ukraine Airplay (TopHit) | 2 |
| UK Singles (OCC) | 13 |
| UK Dance (OCC) | 4 |
| US Hot Dance/Electronic Songs (Billboard) | 11 |

=== Monthly charts ===
Monthly chart performance for "Lovers in a Past Life"
| Chart (2024) | Peak position |
|---|---|
| Belarus Airplay (TopHit) | 6 |
| CIS Airplay (TopHit) | 6 |
| Czech Republic (Rádio – Top 100) | 35 |
| Estonia Airplay (TopHit) | 14 |
| Kazakhstan Airplay (TopHit) | 15 |
| Latvia Airplay (TopHit) | 1 |
| Lithuania Airplay (TopHit) | 9 |
| Moldova Airplay (TopHit) | 85 |
| Romania Airplay (TopHit) | 59 |
| Russia Airplay (TopHit) | 2 |
| Ukraine Airplay (TopHit) | 11 |

=== Year-end charts ===
Year-end chart performance for "Lovers in a Past Life"
| Chart (2024) | Position |
|---|---|
| Belarus Airplay (TopHit) | 23 |
| Belgium (Ultratop 50 Flanders) | 96 |
| CIS Airplay (TopHit) | 14 |
| Estonia Airplay (TopHit) | 58 |
| Hungary (Dance Top 40) | 82 |
| Iceland (Tónlistinn) | 82 |
| Kazakhstan Airplay (TopHit) | 41 |
| Lithuania Airplay (TopHit) | 25 |
| Poland (Polish Airplay Top 100) | 73 |
| Russia Airplay (TopHit) | 7 |
| US Hot Dance/Electronic Songs (Billboard) | 72 |

2025 year-end chart performance for "Lovers in a Past Life"
| Chart (2025) | Position |
|---|---|
| CIS Airplay (TopHit) | 192 |
| Hungary (Dance Top 40) | 56 |
| Lithuania Airplay (TopHit) | 106 |

== Certifications ==
Certifications for "Lovers in a Past Life"
| Region | Certification | Certified units/sales |
|---|---|---|
| United Kingdom (BPI) | Gold | 400,000^{‡} |
^{‡} Sales+streaming figures based on certification alone.

== Release history ==
Release dates and formats for "Lovers in a Past Life"
| Region | Date | Format | Label | Ref. |
|---|---|---|---|---|
| Various | 16 February 2024 | Digital download; streaming | Sony | |
| Italy | 16 February 2024 | Radio airplay | Sony | |

== See also ==
- List of Billboard number-one dance songs of 2024
