= B.O.T.A. (Baddest of Them All) =

2022 single by Eliza Rose and Interplanetary Criminal

Single by Eliza Rose and Interplanetary Criminal
- B-side: "Move to The"
- Released: 15 June 2022
- Genre: House
- Length: 6:02; 3:51 (edit)
- Label: Rosebud; Warner; One House
- Songwriter: Eliza Rose
- Producer: Interplanetary Criminal

Eliza Rose and Interplanetary Criminal singles chronology
"Move to The" (2022)	"B.O.T.A. (Baddest of Them All)" (2022)	"Better Love" (2023)

Music video
- "B.O.T.A. (Baddest of Them All)" on YouTube

"B.O.T.A. (Baddest of Them All)" is a song by British DJs Eliza Rose and Interplanetary Criminal. Written and performed by Rose, it includes a sample of Lisa Lisa and Cult Jam's 1991 song "Let the Beat Hit 'Em" (LL W:Love RC Mix). "B.O.T.A. (Baddest of Them All)" initially received a digital and limited dubplate release through Rose's independent record label Rosebud Recordings on 15 June 2022. After gaining popularity through DJ sets at the Glastonbury Festival, the track went viral on the app TikTok and was released on a licensing deal through Warner Records on 12 August 2022.

"B.O.T.A. (Baddest of Them All)" topped the UK Singles Chart for two consecutive weeks and became the chart's milestone 1,400th number-one single. "B.O.T.A. (Baddest of Them All)" became the first single by a female DJ to reach the summit of the UK Singles Chart since Sonique's "It Feels So Good". It was also the number one single in the United Kingdom on the day of the death of Queen Elizabeth II and ascention of King Charles III. Outside the United Kingdom, "B.O.T.A. (Baddest of Them All)" also topped the charts in Ireland and peaked within the top ten of the charts in Australia, Lithuania and New Zealand. Rose performed the song live at the 25th MOBO Awards alongside Sonique and Sweet Female Attitude. In December 2022, "B.O.T.A." was certified platinum in the UK and Australia, and appeared in critic year-end lists by the NME, Pitchfork and The Guardian. In January 2023 it placed second in Australia's Triple J Hottest 100 for 2022.

== Background ==
Eliza Rose had been a DJ on the London circuit for 7 years. In February 2022, she signed to One House. According to Rose, the song originated when she was provided the beat by Manchester-based producer DJ Interplanetary Criminal. She then wrote majority of the song within a few minutes, emphasising adding "cutesy" elements as well as "grittiness". She detailed the thought process behind the song in an interview, saying: "This track is so nostalgic. When I first heard the beat it gave me instant memories of growing up in the 90s and the bubblegum-tinged dance music from that time. Going on seaside holidays, hanging around the surreal atmospheres of the arcade, meeting boys, and being cute and flirty. Then you have the "Baddest of Them All" lyric that counteracts that innocence and adds the edge, which came to me at just the right time via a Jackie Brown Blaxploitation poster. It definitely reflects the two contrasting aspects of my personality. Girly and cutesie, but a bit of a bad gal too!"

== Composition ==
The song was described as a "supremely fun, suave, 4×4 anthem with plenty of swagger and flirtatious lyrics that permeate your mind." Dazed said that the song "has elements of UK garage, which remains one of Rose's biggest inspirations, and maybe a little dash of PC Music, but really it's a tribute to 90s dance."

== Music video ==
The music video was released on 15 June 2022 and was filmed in Rose's home of Hackney, London. Directed by Jeanie Crystal, it features guest appearances by drag icon Ms Sharon Le Grand, Vogue Ball founder Taboo, dancer Sakeema Peng Crook and artist Wet Mess. Julian Broad worked on the video as a lighting technician. The Lewis Carroll-inspired video celebrates the LGBTQ+ performance community.

== Charts ==
=== Weekly charts ===
Weekly chart performance for "B.O.T.A. (Baddest of Them All)"
Chart (2022)	Peak position
Australia (ARIA)	4
Austria (Ö3 Austria Top 40)	68
Belgium (Ultratop 50 Flanders)	24
Canada (Canadian Hot 100)	71
Croatia (HRT)	11
France (SNEP)	167
Germany (GfK)	36
Global 200 (Billboard)	47
Greece (IFPI)	46
Ireland (IRMA)	1
Lithuania (AGATA)	2
Netherlands (Dutch Top 40)	19
Netherlands (Single Top 100)	16
New Zealand (Recorded Music NZ)	7
Poland (Polish Airplay Top 100)	27
Portugal (AFP)	147
Slovakia (Singles Digitál Top 100)	38
Sweden (Sverigetopplistan)	75
Switzerland (Schweizer Hitparade)	45
UK Singles (OCC)	1
UK Dance (OCC)	1
UK Indie (OCC)	2
US Hot Dance/Electronic Songs (Billboard)	8

=== Year-end charts ===
2022 year-end chart performance for "B.O.T.A. (Baddest of Them All)"
Chart (2022)	Position
Australia (ARIA)	50
Belgium (Ultratop 50 Flanders)	125
Lithuania (AGATA)	59
Netherlands (Single Top 100)	96
UK Singles (OCC)	24
US Hot Dance/Electronic Songs (Billboard)	48

2023 year-end chart performance for "B.O.T.A. (Baddest of Them All)"
Chart (2023)	Position
Australia (ARIA)	65
UK Singles (OCC)	48
US Hot Dance/Electronic Songs (Billboard)	40

== Certifications ==
Certifications for "B.O.T.A. (Baddest of Them All)"
Region	Certification	Certified units/sales
Australia (ARIA)	Platinum	70,000^{‡}
Canada (Music Canada)	Gold	40,000^{‡}
France (SNEP)	Gold	100,000^{‡}
Netherlands (NVPI)	Gold	40,000^{‡}
New Zealand (RMNZ)	2× Platinum	60,000^{‡}
Poland (ZPAV)	Platinum	50,000^{‡}
Spain (Promusicae)	Gold	30,000^{‡}
United Kingdom (BPI)	2× Platinum	1,200,000^{‡}
^{‡} Sales+streaming figures based on certification alone.
