= Flashback Records =

UK record label and record store chain

Flashback Records is a record label and a chain of independent record stores in London. It specializes in trading vinyl records with an emphasis on rare collectable records such as first pressings and hard to find releases. It also stocks new contemporary vinyl and has hosted live performances by Thurston Moore (Sonic Youth), Half Japanese, as well as UK bands such as Mazes, Fair Ohs, Dead Coast, Veronica Falls and Shopping. Flashback is also known for hosting live music events at local music venues The Shacklewell Arms, The George Tavern, MOTH Club, and The Old Blue Last, supporting emerging bands on the London and UK music scene. UK No. 1 hit single maker DJ Eliza Rose is a former employee of Flashback Records and credits the shop as educating her on a diverse range of music, which the shop is famous for stocking.

== History ==
Flashback opened in 1997 with one shop in Essex Road. It originally sold vintage clothes in its basement and vinyl on the ground floor. In the year 2000 it divided into two separate shops on Essex Road opposite to each other. The original store on Essex Road then sold vinyl in the basement and CDs, VHS, DVDs and computer games on the ground floor. In 2006 Flashback Records acquired Listen, a record store at 144 Crouch Hill, Crouch End, London which was facing closure due to a fading vinyl market. In 2014 Flashback Records opened its third retail store in Shoreditch. In 2021, Flashback's Crouch End record shop relocated to a larger premises on 26 Topsfield Parade, Tottenham Lane, Crouch End. It has been voted one of the best shops in London by Time Out.

== Label ==
Flashback Records has released material such as 'Levitation - Meanwhile Gardens' which was originally recorded in 1992 and 1993 and completely re-mastered and finally released on 23 October 2015. UK band Tolerance Manoeuvre released their debut LP on Flashback Records label on 17 July 2015. In 2020, while buying in a record collection, Flashback's owner Mark Burgess found a 7" acetate of an unreleased punk record that belonged to Chas Hines, the lead singer of Bona Rays who had sold in the record. Impressed by the quality of the track and its historical significance as one of the earliest records to feature a black female lead singer on a punk record, it was finally released on Flashback Records, over 40 years after it was recorded.
