= Air Maxes (song) =

2025 song by Kettama, Fred Again and Shady Nasty

Single by Kettama, Fred Again and Shady Nasty

from the album Archangel
- Released: 4 July 2025
- Genre: Hard house; techno
- Length: 3:33
- Label: Steel City Dance Discs
- Songwriters: Evan Campbell; Fred Gibson; Kevin Stathis; Haydn Green; Luca Watson
- Producers: Kettama; Fred again..

Kettama singles chronology
"Gotta Have It" (2025)	"Air Maxes" (2025)	"If U Want My Heart" (2025)

Fred Again singles chronology
"Victory Lap" (2025)	"Air Maxes" (2025)	"You're a Star" (2025)

Shady Nasty singles chronology
"Screwdriva" (2025)	"Air Maxes" (2025)

Official video
- "Air Maxes" on YouTube

"Air Maxes" is a song by Irish DJ Kettama, English DJ Fred Again, and Australian group Shady Nasty. The song was released for digital download and streaming by Steel City Dance Discs on 4 July 2025, as the fourth single from Kettama's debut studio album, Archangel (2025).

== Track listing ==
- Digital download and streaming – Kettama Mix
1. "Air Maxes" (Kettama Mix) – 3:33

== Credits and personnel ==
Credits adapted from Apple Music.

- Kettama – production, composing, synthesizer programming
- Fred again.. – production, composing, synthesizer programming
- Shady Nasty – vocals, songwriting
- Max Richter – composing
- Elliot Struck – composing

== Charts ==
Chart performance for "Air Maxes"
Chart (2025)	Peak position
New Zealand Hot Singles (RMNZ)	13

== Release history ==
Region	Date	Format	Label	Ref.
Various	4 July 2025	Digital download; streaming	Steel City Dance Discs	
