= Kettama =

Irish musician and producer

- Born: Evan Campbell; 30 May 1997 (age 29); Galway, Ireland
- Genres: Electronic; house; techno; trance
- Occupations: Producer; DJ
- Years active: 2015–present
- Labels: G-Town; Steel City Dance Discs

Evan Campbell (born 30 May 1997), known professionally as Kettama (stylised in all caps), is an Irish electronic music producer and DJ.

He has often performed and released music under collaborative aliases, such as Samba Boys with Tommy Holohan, and the portmanteau KETBOI69 with Partiboi69.

== Early life ==
Campbell was born in Galway, Ireland. When Campbell was 16, he bought a Launchpad that came with a trial of Ableton, where he experimented by remaking the piano from Tyga's "I'm Different". Six months later, he downloaded a cracked version of FL Studio and began uploading his tracks to SoundCloud.

== Career ==
By the age of 17, Kettama had begun performing in clubs.

He rose to prominence in 2018 with "B O D Y", from the Bucklyn Bridge EP, which gained international attention after frequent play by Mall Grab, and fellow Irish DJ Annie Mac.

In 2019, he co-founded G-Town Records with Shampain, named after their shared hometown of Galway. In 2023, he performed a sold-out homecoming show during the Galway International Arts Festival, and in 2024 made his debut at major festivals including Glastonbury, Coachella, and Boomtown.

On 5 June 2025, "It Gets Better (Forever Mix)" by Kettama charted at No. 37 on the Irish Singles Chart. On 29 May 2026, "Comes and Goes" entered the Irish Singles Chart at No. 19, and climbed to the top position of the Irish Homegrown Chart.

In 2025, Campbell began a residency on BBC Radio 1 Dance.

== Personal life ==
In June 2024, Campbell went public with English fashion model Lottie Moss after they were seen leaving a clothing brand launch together. In September that same year, Moss confirmed via Twitter that the pair had split. In 2025, he began dating English content creator Alice Thomas (Alice T) with Campbell sharing a photo of the pair via Instagram in September.

== Discography ==
=== Studio albums ===
Title	Details	Peak chart positions				
Title	Details	IRE	AUS	BEL (FL)	NLD	UK
Archangel	Released: 3 October 2025; Formats: CD, digital download, LP, streaming; Label: Steel City Dance Discs	6	10	37	31	43

=== Remix albums ===
Title	Title
Archangel (DJ Mix)	Released: 17 October 2025; Formats: Digital download, streaming; Label: Steel City Dance Discs

=== Extended plays ===
Title	Details
Bucklyn Bridge	Released: 16 September 2018; Formats: Digital download, streaming; Label: Homage
Eastside Avenue	Released: 12 April 2019; Formats: Digital download, streaming; Label: N/A
Dance Trax, Vol. 23	Released: 11 October 2019; Formats: Digital download, streaming; Label: Dance Trax
Temperature Rising	Released: 1 November 2019; Formats: Digital download, streaming; Label: G-Town Records
G-Town 001	Released: 9 April 2021; Formats: Digital download, streaming; Label: G-Town Records
Steel City Dance Discs Volume 26	Released: 27 October 2021; Formats: Digital download, streaming; Label: Steel City Dance Discs; Various artists compilation
Close Your Eyes (with Prospa)	Released: 16 February 2022; Formats: Digital download, streaming; Label: Technicolour
G-Town 004	Released: 30 March 2023; Formats: Digital download, streaming; Label: G-Town Records
Fallen Angel	Released: 24 August 2023; Formats: Digital download, streaming; Label: Steel City Dance Discs
As You Were	Released: 12 October 2023; Formats: Digital download, streaming; Label: G-Town Records

=== Singles ===
List of singles, with selected chart positions and certifications
Title	Year	Peak chart positions							Certifications	Album
Title	Year	IRE	AUS	AUS Dance	NZ Hot	UK	UK Dance	US Dance	Certifications	Album
"Sundaze"	2019	—	—	—	—	—	—	—		4 Years of Service
"London Break"	2020	—	—	—	—	—	—	—		Non-album singles
"2001"	2020	—	—	—	—	—	—	—		Non-album singles
"The Way You Feel" (with Lone)	2020	—	—	—	—	—	—	—		Lone X Kettama
"Harajuku Hammer" (with Cody Currie)	2020	—	—	—	—	—	—	—		Non-album singles
"This Break Sounds Better with You"	2020	—	—	—	—	—	—	—		Non-album singles
"Freq U All Nite" (with Partiboi69)	2021	—	—	—	—	—	—	—		Non-album singles
"Higher (Steel City Power House)"	2021	—	—	—	—	—	—	—		Steel City Dance Discs Volume 26
"Picanya 2400"	2021	—	—	—	—	—	—	—		Steel City Dance Discs Volume 26
"Close Your Eyes" (with Prospa)	2022	—	—	—	—	—	—	—		Non-album single
"Samba Soccer 2001"	2022	—	—	—	—	—	—	—		G-Town 004
"Blitz Zuruck"	2023	—	—	—	—	—	—	—		G-Town 004
"Feeling Emotions"	2023	—	—	—	—	—	—	—		Fallen Angel
"Fallen Angel"	2023	—	—	—	—	—	—	—		Fallen Angel
"Fly Away XTC"	2023	—	—	—	—	—	—	—		Fallen Angel
"Purple Hearts" (with Real Lies)	2024	—	—	—	—	—	—	—		Non-album singles
"Fen Violet" (with Underworld)	2024	—	—	—	—	—	—	—		Non-album singles
"Pretty Green Eyes (Sunset Ibiza Mix)"	2024	76	—	—	—	—	—	—		Non-album singles
"The Miracle Makers" (with Ewan McVicar)	2024	—	—	—	—	—	—	—		Non-album singles
"Yosemite" (with Interplanetary Criminal)	2024	39	—	15	7	—	—	—	BPI: Silver; RMNZ: Gold	Archangel
"It Gets Better (Forever Mix)"	2025	37	—	9	22	—	33	—	ARIA: Gold; BPI: Silver; RMNZ: Gold	Archangel
"Gotta Have It"	2025	—	—	—	—	—	—	—		Archangel
"Air Maxes" (with Shady Nasty and Fred Again)	2025	—	—	—	13	—	—	—		Archangel
"If U Want My Heart" (with DJ Heartstring featuring KLP)	2025	—	—	—	36	—	—	—		Archangel
"Sort It Out" (with Clouds)	2025	—	—	—	27	—	—	—		Archangel
"Man with a Second Face"	2025	61	—	—	4	—	—	—		Archangel
"Hardstyle 2" (with Fred Again and Shady Nasty)	2025	58	—	17	—	—	38	24		USB
"Comes and Goes"	2026	19	85	9	4	54	11	14		Non-album singles
"Pumpin" (with Partiboi69)	2026	—	—	—	31	—	—	—		Non-album singles
"Feels Like Heaven" (with Loods and Camden Cox)	2026	—	—	—	23	—	—	—		Non-album singles
"Mystery of Raw" (with Michael Bibi and Wu Tang Clan)	2026	—	—	—	—	—	—	—		Non-album singles
"Think of You" (with Prospa)	2026	18	—	—	8	25	3	11		Non-album singles
"—" denotes items which were not released in that country or failed to chart.

== Remixes ==
Title	Year	Artist(s)
"Staunch" (Kettama Remix)	2018	Dusky
"Turn the Box Up" (Kettama Graveyard Mix)	2019	DJ Haus
"Sungazing" (Remix)	2019	Rebel Phoenix featuring Marcus Woods
"Better Late Than Never" (Kettama Remix)	2020	Lafayette
"Overcast" (Kettama's Del Boy Remix Remix)	2020	Pentland Park
"Voice Within" (Kettama Remix)	2021	Anastasia Kristensen
"De Carle" (Kettama Remix)	2023	DMA's
"Sliver" (Kettama Remix)	2023	Special Request
"Secrets" (Kettama Remix)	2023	LB aka LABAT
"Blessings" (Kettama Remix)	2025	Calvin Harris featuring Clementine Douglas
"Air Maxes" (Kettama Mix)	2025	Kettama, Fred Again.. and Shady Nasty
"Solo" (Kettama Remix)	2026	Fred Again.. and Blanco
"Look Out For Me: Kettama Version"	2026	Turnstile
