= Ayr Pavilion =

Former music venue and multi-purpose hall in Ayr, Scotland

Coordinates: 55°27′38″N 4°38′25″W

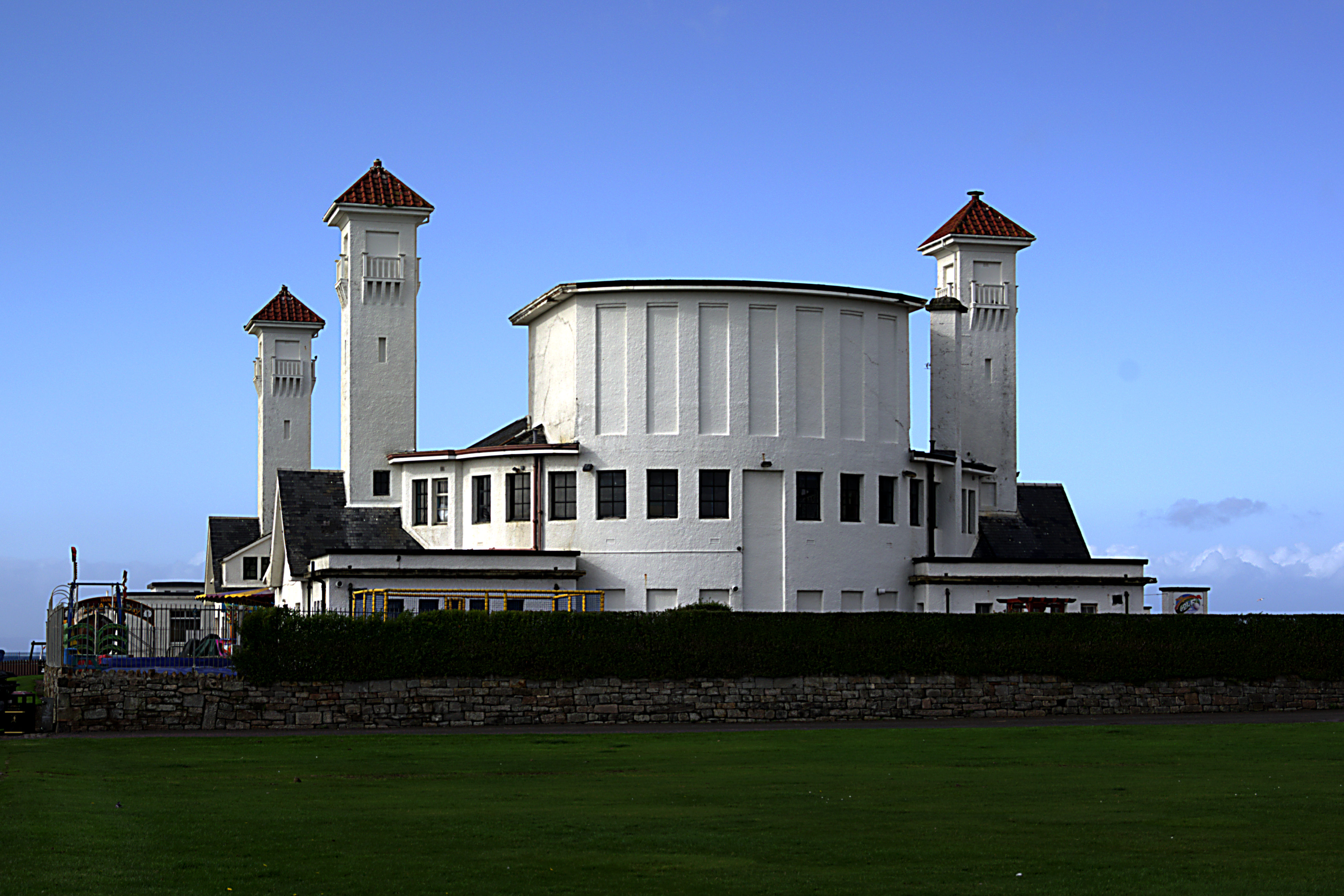
Ayr Pavilion

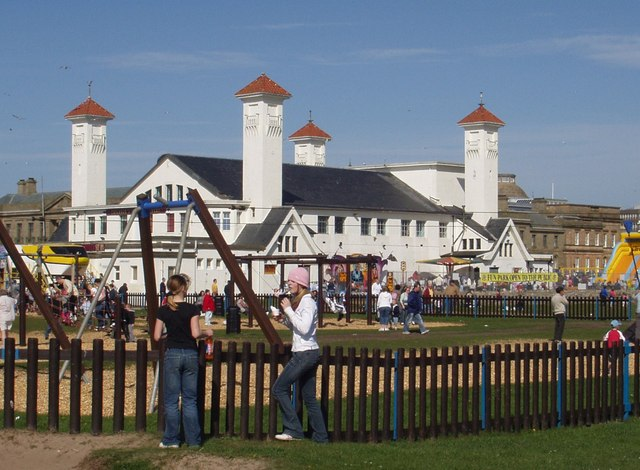
Ayr Pavilion

Ayr Pavilion is a former music venue and multi-purpose hall in Ayr, Scotland, situated on Ayr's Low Green.

== History ==
Ayr Pavilion was built in 1911 after plans by architect James Kennedy Hunter. The auditorium had ca. 600 seats.

During the 20th century the venue was used for a variety of entertainment, including music hall performances, dances, and ice skating. American forces stationed at nearby Prestwick Airport during the Second World War reportedly had a new dance floor laid at the venue. From 1974, the stage and scenery grid were restored by the Ayr Intimate Opera company, and the venue hosted opera and a classical concert series through the early 1980s, as well as other events including the British Chess Championships.

The pavilion hosted artists such as Iron Maiden, Gary Numan, Ian Gillan, Rory Gallagher, New Order and Faith No More.

In the 1990s the building was used as a night club named Hanger 13. During the early 1990s raves became the target of much police and media interest after three alleged ecstasy-related deaths occurred. The club was eventually shut down, although there was a "unity campaign" to keep the venue open.

The building subsequently operated for around two decades as "Pirate Pete's Family Entertainment Centre", a children's soft play.

Since 2023, Pavilion Festival, an electronic dance music festival, has been held annually on the Low Green. The festival is named after the Pavilion.

In November 2025, dance music promoter STREETrave staged two sold-out "Homecoming" weekends inside the building before its planned refit as a soft play centre continued.

In January 2026, it was announced that Pirate Pete's would close permanently and that the building would resume use as a live music and events venue under the name Ayr Pavilion.

== See also ==
- List of electronic dance music venues
- Pavilion Festival
