= Free (Calvin Harris and Ellie Goulding song) =

2024 single

Single by Calvin Harris and Ellie Goulding

from the album 96 Months
- Released: 26 July 2024
- Genre: Dance-pop; electronic
- Length: 3:32
- Label: Sony UK
- Songwriters: Adam Wiles; Theo Hutchcraft; Chenai Zinyuku
- Producer: Calvin Harris

Calvin Harris singles chronology
| "Lovers in a Past Life" (2024) | "Free" (2024) | "Smoke the Pain Away" (2025) |

Ellie Goulding singles chronology
| "Brightest Blue" (Nature remix) (2024) | "Free" (2024) | "In My Dreams" (2024) |

Calvin Harris and Ellie Goulding singles chronology
| "Miracle" (2023) | "Free" (2024) |

Lyric video
- "Free" on YouTube

"Free" is a song by the Scottish DJ and record producer Calvin Harris and the English singer-songwriter Ellie Goulding, from Harris' first compilation album, 96 Months (2024). "Free" marks the fourth collaboration between Harris and Goulding, and the duo's first collaboration since 2023's trance song "Miracle", which saw massive critical and commercial success. "Free" was released as the lead single from 96 Months on 26 July 2024 under Sony Music UK to widespread critical acclaim from music critics who praised the duo's longtime creative partnership.

== Composition ==
"Free" is a dance-pop track, which is built around a piano house refrain. Robin Murray from Clash magazine described the production as it "leans back on Millennial pop touchstones, while also overhauling them". As well noticing elements that "touches on trance production, while also nodding to hyper-pop". Andrew Wescott from Dork said that the "heartfelt" lyrics "echoes the euphoric, singalong vibe that characterizes their past hits". "Free" marks the first song from the duo that doesn't feature writing credits from Goulding.

== Critical reception ==
"Free" was met with critical acclaim upon its release. Robin Murray from Clash magazine praised both Harris and Goulding's contributions to the track, highlighting Goulding's emotional vocal performance and Harris production style, calling it pleasingly "the way the duo re-interpolate these 00s tropes, while retaining a wonderful pop song at its core". Tom Skinner from NME dubbed the song as "The rousing summer anthem". Rolling Stone included "Free" on their "Songs You Need to Know" which highlight the best new tracks of the week. Jason Heffler from EDM.com praised Harris and Goulding stating that their "latest anthem "Free" reinforces the fact that some artistic partnerships are simply destined for greatness". ThatGrapeJuice called "Free" an "electrifying anthem", and praised the blending of Goulding's ethereals vocals with Harris production "making it an instant hit for the summer".

== Commercial performance ==
"Free" entered at number thirty-six on the UK Singles Chart, marking the duos fourth consecutive top-40 hit single. Eventually it peaked at number thirty-five on its third week. On October 12, "Free" topped the US Dance/Mix Show Airplay, making Harris the artist with most number ones singles on the chart, with sixteen, breaking a tie with David Guetta. Meanwhile, Goulding tied with Madonna as the fifth artist, and the second among female acts with most number ones, with seven. Overall, the song achieved moderate commercial success, in contrast of their previous efforts.

== Live performance ==
Harris' unveiled the track for the first time during his DJ set at Ushuaïa Ibiza, he shared a preview to his Instagram account with the caption: "Trying out the new one @ushuaiaibiza!". On July 20, Goulding made a surprise appearance at Harris' Ushuaïa set to perform "Free" live for the first time.

== Music video ==
A lyric video was released the same day the song dropped on Harris, YouTube channel. As August 18, a music video for the song has not been released or teased, making "Free" Harris and Goulding first collaboration to not feature a proper music video, instead a recording of Harris and Goulding's first-time live performance of "Free" at Usuahia Ibiza served as an official visualizer.

== Track listing ==
- Digital download / streaming
1. "Free" – 3:32
- Digital download / streaming – Sunset Mix
1. "Free" (Sunset Mix) – 3:14
- Digital download / streaming – Joel Corry Remix
1. "Free" (Joel Corry Remix) – 3:03
- Digital download / streaming – Arielle Free Remix
1. "Free" (Arielle Free Remix) – 4:02
- Digital download / streaming – Nicky Romero Remix
1. "Free" (Nicky Romero Remix) – 3:44
- Digital download / streaming – Remixes
1. "Free" (Joel Corry Remix) – 3:03
2. "Free" (Mathame Remix) – 3:58
3. "Free" (Nicky Romero Remix) – 3:44
4. "Free" (Major League Djz Remix) – 6:50
5. "Free" (Effy Remix) – 3:02
6. "Free" (Arielle Free Remix) – 4:02
7. "Free" (sQUIRE Remix) – 3:34

== Credits and personnel ==
- Calvin Harris – songwriter, producer, mixing engineer, vocal producer
- Ellie Goulding – vocals
- Theo Hutchcraft – songwriter
- Chenai Zinyuku – songwriter
- Duncan Fuller – vocal recording engineer
- Mike Marsh – mastering engineer

== Charts ==
=== Weekly charts ===
Weekly chart performance for "Free"
| Chart (2024) | Peak position |
|---|---|
| Estonia Airplay (TopHit) | 18 |
| Ireland (IRMA) | 60 |
| Latvia Airplay (TopHit) | 2 |
| Lithuania Airplay (TopHit) | 3 |
| New Zealand Hot Singles (RMNZ) | 8 |
| Slovakia Airplay (ČNS IFPI) | 22 |
| UK Singles (Official Charts) | 35 |
| UK Dance (Official Charts) | 5 |
| US Hot Dance/Electronic Songs (Billboard) | 15 |

=== Monthly charts ===
Monthly chart performance for "Free"
| Chart (2024) | Peak position |
|---|---|
| Estonia Airplay (TopHit) | 21 |
| Latvia Airplay (TopHit) | 6 |
| Lithuania Airplay (TopHit) | 5 |
| Slovakia (Rádio Top 100) | 28 |

=== Year-end charts ===
Year-end chart performance for "Free"
| Chart (2024) | Position |
|---|---|
| Estonia Airplay (TopHit) | 99 |

== Certifications ==
Certifications for "Free"
| Region | Certification | Certified units/sales |
|---|---|---|
| United Kingdom (BPI) | Silver | 200,000^{‡} |
^{‡} Sales+streaming figures based on certification alone.

== Release history ==
Release dates and formats for "Free"
| Region | Date | Format | Version | Label | Ref. |
|---|---|---|---|---|---|
| Italy | 26 July 2024 | Radio airplay | Original | Sony Italy | |
| Various | 26 July 2024 | Digital download; streaming | Original | Sony UK | |
| Various | 23 August 2024 | Digital download; streaming | Sunset Mix | Sony UK | |
| Various | 8 September 2024 | Digital download; streaming | Joel Corry Remix | Sony UK | |
| Various | 27 September 2024 | Digital download; streaming | Arielle Free Remix | Sony UK | |
| Various | 4 October 2024 | Digital download; streaming | Nicky Romero Remix | Sony UK | |
| Various | 11 October 2024 | Digital download; streaming | Remixes | Sony UK | |

== See also ==
- List of Billboard number-one dance songs of 2024
