= Body Moving =

Single by Eliza Rose and Calvin Harris
- Released: 17 November 2023
- Length: 2:36
- Label: Ministry of Sound
- Songwriters: Eliza Rose; Adam Wiles; Jessie Reyez
- Producer: Calvin Harris

Calvin Harris singles chronology
"Desire" (2023)	"Body Moving" (2023)	"Lovers in a Past Life" (2024)

Eliza Rose singles chronology
"Take You There" (2023)	"Body Moving" (2023)	"Business as Usual" (2024)

Official Video
- "Body Moving" on YouTube

"Body Moving" is a song by English singer Eliza Rose and Scottish DJ and record producer Calvin Harris. It was released on 17 November 2023 through Ministry of Sound and included on Harris' first compilation album, 96 Months (2024).

== Background and release ==
"Body Moving" came together after Rose performed at Harris' Ushuaïa show in Ibiza on 30 June 2023.

"My goal was to create a track that captures the essence of summer while also igniting the dance floors," said Rose. "The vibe with Calvin has been fabulous."

== Critical reception ==
Matt Sierra of EDMTunes called the song "more than a collaboration; it's a vibrant, energetic anthem that captures the essence of both Calvin Harris and Eliza Rose's musical prowess. It's a track that invites you to dance, celebrate, and revel in the power of music."

== Charts ==
=== Weekly charts ===
Weekly chart performance for "Body Moving"
Chart (2023–2024)	Peak position
Belarus Airplay (TopHit)	95
CIS Airplay (TopHit)	79
Croatia International Airplay (Top lista)	7
Estonia Airplay (TopHit)	5
Ireland (IRMA)	58
Kazakhstan Airplay (TopHit)	90
Latvia Airplay (LaIPA)	1
Lithuania Airplay (TopHit)	1
New Zealand Hot Singles (RMNZ)	11
Russia Airplay (TopHit)	72
San Marino Airplay (SMRTV Top 50)	35
Serbia Airplay (Radiomonitor)	6
UK Singles (OCC)	34
UK Dance (OCC)	11
US Hot Dance/Electronic Songs (Billboard)	30
US Pop Airplay (Billboard)	31

=== Monthly charts ===
Monthly chart performance for "Body Moving"
Chart (2024)	Peak position
CIS Airplay (TopHit)	5
Estonia Airplay (TopHit)	6
Lithuania Airplay (TopHit)	3
Russia Airplay (TopHit)	97

=== Year-end charts ===
2024 year-end chart performance for "Body Moving"
Chart (2024)	Position
Estonia Airplay (TopHit)	45
Lithuania Airplay (TopHit)	30

2025 year-end chart performance for "Body Moving"
Chart (2025)	Position
Lithuania Airplay (TopHit)	193

== Certifications ==
Region	Certification	Certified units/sales
United Kingdom (BPI)	Silver	200,000^{‡}
^{‡} Sales+streaming figures based on certification alone.

== See also ==
- List of Billboard number-one dance songs of 2024
