= Partiboi69 =

Australian electronic music producer and DJ

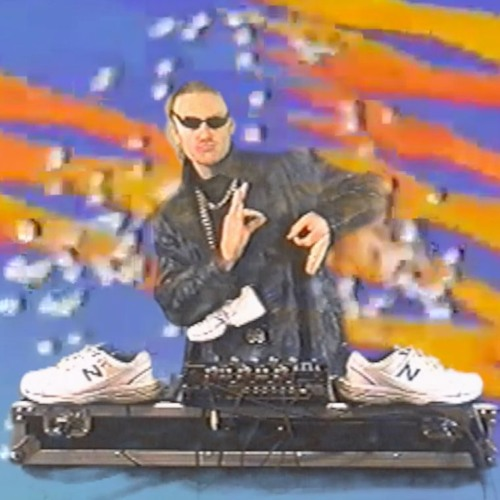
- Partiboi69 (2018)

Background information
- Also known as: Stingray
- Born: Fintan Felix Bradley
- Origin: Melbourne, Australia
- Genres: Electronic; techno
- Occupations: Producer; DJ
- Years active: 2016–present
- Labels: Unprotected Records; Stingboi Productions; Mutual Pleasure
- Website: partiboi69.com

Fintan Felix Bradley, known professionally as Partiboi69, is an Australian electronic music producer and DJ.

== Biography ==
Bradley started his music career under the stage name Stingray in 2016. He started his own label, Unprotected Records, as he wanted full control of his work, and a way to release tracks immediately, rather than having to send demos out. In 2018, he would change his professional name to Partiboi69.

In 2023, Bradley made his Boiler Room debut in Bengaluru, with the set earning over 1.5 million views on YouTube. He would team up with Irish producer and DJ Kettama under the portmanteau KETBOI69, for a joint Australia tour titled "Taste the Grapes" from December 2024 to January 2025.

Bradley's sister, Fionnuala, is also a DJ under the stage name Juicy Romance.

== Controversies ==
In an article published by Resident Advisor in 2022, Bradley was criticized by Underground Resistance label manager Cornelius Harris, for Bradley's sampling of black artists and ghettotech. Bradley subsequently declined to comment on the matter. In the same article, Dr. Alia Benabdellah, stated "Yes, you can live in the ghetto and be white, but does Partiboi69 come from that environment?"

== Discography ==
=== Extended plays ===
Title	Details
Mutual Pleasure 002	Released: 28 September 2021; Formats: Digital download, streaming; Label: Mutual Pleasure
Naughty by Nature (with MCR-T)	Released: 3 March 2023; Formats: Digital download, streaming; Label: Mutual Pleasure
Ride Hard	Released: 14 April 2023; Formats: Digital download, streaming; Label: Pleasure Trax
Call of the Void	Released: 1 March 2024; Formats: Digital download, streaming; Label: Running Back
K On My D + C (Remixes) (with Juicy Romance)	Released: 5 June 2024; Formats: Digital download, streaming; Label: Mutual Pleasure
Case Number: DS46013455	Released: 11 October 2024; Formats: Digital download, streaming; Label: Self-released

=== Mixtapes ===
Title	Details
UNPREC069	Released: 10 February 2020; Label: Mutual Pleasure; Format: Digital download
69 Juice	Released: 28 May 2020; Label: Mutual Pleasure; Format: Digital download
