= Chris Stassy =

Dutch DJ and producer (born 1994)

- Also known as: Chris Stussy
- Born: Niels Christiaan Steenbergen; 2 July 1994 (age 32); Leiderdorp, Netherlands
- Genres: Deep tech; deep house; house; electro house; minimal house
- Occupations: Record producer; DJ
- Years active: 2014–present
- Label: Up the Stuss
- Website: chrisstussy.com

Niels Christiaan Steenbergen (born 2 July 1994), better known by stage names Chris Stussy and Chris Stassy, is a Dutch DJ and producer.

Chris Stassy has released music on his imprint Up the Stuss and well-known record labels such Fuse London, Kaoz Theory, PIV and Rutilance Recordings. His songs include "Pumpin'", "Won't Stop (Don't)", "Breather", "Wide Awake" and "Midtown Playground". His most famous single, "Desire" has been streamed over 50 million times on Spotify.

== Personal life ==
Niels Steenbergen grew up in Leiden, a municipality in South Holland near the coast, which is 30 minutes away from Amsterdam and Rotterdam.

== Career ==
Stassy has performed at Pacha, DC10, Amnesia in Ibiza, Coachella, Music On, Mint, Creamfields, Club Space and Parklife. He worked as one half of the musical duo Stussko with Kolter, and as one half of the duo Across Boundaries, with Locklead.

In 2020, Stassy founded his own record label called Up the Stuss.

Stassy's career significantly grew in 2023, with the release of hit single "All Night Long", released on his own recording label. This single, along with the following "Midtown Playground EP", released on Fuse Records, greatly increased the artist's streaming numbers, which today surpasses 2 million monthly listeners.

In February 2024, Stassy launched a docu-series titled Chris Stussy: Uncut on his YouTube channel. The monthly series followed Stassy behind the scenes from the past two years of shows, producing and more.

In May 2024, Stassy performed the first Boiler Room event of his career, at Warehouse '92 in Edinburgh.

Stassy announced in September 2024 that he would be launching his own event series, called 'USS', in London. The inaugural show was held on 1 February 2025. At USS events, Stassy cultivates a no-phones policy, aiming to create a shared connection between the DJ, the sound system and the people in the room.

In February 2026, Stassy announced his debut album Lost, Found & Forgotten, which was released in April of the same year.

He took over a four-part series on Radio 1's Residency for BBC Radio 1 Dance in April 2026, where he showcased his musical evolution and debut album Lost, Found & Forgotten. He also previously delivered a landmark BBC Radio 1 Essential Mix in October 2024.

In August 2026, he changed his stage name to Chris Stassy due to legal pressures from the fashion label Stüssy.

== Discography ==
=== Albums ===
- Get Together (with S.A.M, 2021)
- Mysteries of the Universe (2022)
- Lost, Found & Forgotten (2026)

with Across Boundaries

- Sense of Future (2023)
- Sakura (2025)

=== Singles and EPs ===
- Movement EP (2014)
- "Unexpected" (2014)
- One Thing I Can EP (2015)
- "Display & Sustain" (2015)
- "For the Music" (2015)
- "The Machine" (2016)
- Creativity EP (2016)
- Chris Stussy (2016)
- "Take My Swing" (2016)
- The Heat EP (2016)
- Wanna Dance EP (2017)
- Soul Patrol EP (2017)
- Music On EP (2017)
- Ladies Night EP (2017)
- Brooklyn Tears EP (2017)
- Nighdriver EP (2017)
- Boogie Trippin EP (2018)
- "Material / The System" (2018)
- Positive Mind EP (2018)
- "PIV Limited 002 / Speak" (2018)
- Politics of Dancing X Chris Stussy & Sun Archive (2019)
- Whatudo EP (2019)
- Reminders, Vol.5 (2019)
- Shades of Grey EP (with Djebali, 2019)
- Electro City Moving EP (2019)
- "ENDZ032" (2020)
- "Nunchi" (2020)
- Timewriter EP (2020)
- Across Ocean EP (2020)
- Take a Leap of Faith EP (2021)
- A Glimmer of Hope EP (2021)
- Angel in the Sky EP (2022)
- "All Night Long" (2023)
- Midtown Playground EP (2023)
- "Desire" (2024)
- "Go" (with Moby) (2024)
- Won't Stop (Don't) EP (2024)
- "It's About Us" (2025)
- "Wide Awake" (feat. Tom Did It) (2026)

with Across Boundaries

- "Synergy" (2024)

=== Remixes ===
- Kerri Chandler and Troy Denari - "The Way It Goes (Track 1)" (Chris Stussy Remix) (2020)
- Solaris Heights - "Midnight" (Chris Stussy Remix) (2021)
- Todd Terry and Sound Design - "Bounce to the Beat" (Chris Stussy Remix) (2024)
- Kettama - "It Gets Better" (Chris Stussy Remix) (2025)
