= DJ Heartstring =

German musical duo

- Origin: Berlin, Germany
- Genres: Electronic; techno
- Years active: 2021-present
- Members: Leo Brede; Jonas Hellberg
- Website: djheartstring.com

DJ Heartstring (stylised in all caps) are a German DJ and production duo, consisting of Jonas Hellberg and Leonard "Leo" Hans Victor Brede, formed in Berlin in 2021.

== Biography ==
Both Brede and Hellberg began producing electronic music as teenagers, before meeting around 2017 through Brede's girlfriend. The duo released their debut EP "Destiny of the Moment" in 2021 through Union Trance Mission.

In June 2023, DJ Heartstring made their Boiler Room debut at AVA Festival, which achieved over 100k views in under a week. That same year, they were crowned as one of the BBC Radio 1 Future Dance Stars by Sarah Story.

== Discography ==
=== Studio albums ===
Title	Details	Peak chart positions
Title	Details	AUS
Sentimental Ultra	Released: 13 November 2026; Formats: CD, digital download, LP, streaming; Label: Steel City Dance Discs	17

=== Extended plays ===
Title	Details
Destiny of the Moment	Released: 28 July 2021; Formats: digital download, streaming; Label: Union Trance Mission
Eternal Euphoria	Released: 26 November 2021; Formats: digital download, streaming; Label: Lobster Theremin
4 the People	Released: 4 February 2022; Formats: digital download, streaming; Label: DJ Heartstring
Met Her at Bäreneck	Released: 15 April 2022; Formats: digital download, streaming; Label: DJ Heartstring
Gift (with TELESHOP)	Released: 27 May 2022; Formats: digital download, streaming; Label: DJ Heartstring
Teenage Dreams	Released: 7 April 2023; Formats: digital download, streaming; Label: Teenage Dreams, A Million / Groove Attack
Why Can't We Live Forever?	Released: 27 October 2023; Formats: digital download, streaming; Label: Polydor
Fuerteventura Forever	Released: 20 September 2024; Formats: digital download, streaming; Label: Teenage Dreams, A Million / Groove Attack
You Are the Sun, I Am the Sky	Released: 14 February 2025; Formats: digital download, streaming; Label: DJ Heartstring
Forever (with Swim)	Released: 22 August 2025; Formats: digital download, streaming; Label: DJ Heartstring & SWIM

=== Singles ===
Title	Year	Label	Album
"Coming Back 2 U"	2021	Lobster Theremin	Eternal Euphoria (EP)
"Lost In Emotion"	2021	Lobster Theremin	Eternal Euphoria (EP)
"São Paulo Fever"	2021	Lobster Theremin	Eternal Euphoria (EP)
"Meteora Sunrise"	2021	DJ Heartstring	Met Her at Bäreneck (EP)
"BAE"	2023	Teenage Dreams; A Million / Groove Attack	Teenage Dreams (EP)
"Never Let Me Go"	2023	Teenage Dreams; A Million / Groove Attack	Teenage Dreams (EP)
"It Ain't Over"	2023	Teenage Dreams; A Million / Groove Attack	Non-album singles
"In Your Arms"	2024	Teenage Dreams; A Million / Groove Attack	Non-album singles
"Don't Stop" (with southstar)	2024	Teenage Dreams; A Million / Groove Attack	Non-album singles
"Alone Again" (with SWIM)	2024	DJ Heartstring & SWIM	Non-album singles
"Last Time Under Purple Skies"	2025	DJ Heartstring	You Are The Sun, I Am The Sky (EP)
"Staring Into The Sun"	2025	COLUMBIA	Non-album singles
"Back to My Love"	2025	Armada Music	Non-album singles
"If U Want My Heart" (with Kettama featuring KLP)	2025	Steel City Dance Discs	Archangel
"What It Feels Like in 2007" (with Baugruppe90)	2026	DJ Heartstring	Sentimental Ultra
"A Thousand Lies" (with DMA's and Saidah)	2026	DJ Heartstring	Sentimental Ultra
"Another Year Along (I Love You)"	2026	DJ Heartstring	Sentimental Ultra
"So Many Things to Say" (with Sam Gellaintry)	2026	DJ Heartstring	Sentimental Ultra
"Sentimental Ultra" (with Spriitzz)	2026	DJ Heartstring	Sentimental Ultra
"Supersonic Pleasure	2026	DJ Heartstring	Sentimental Ultra

== Remixes ==
Title	Year	Artist(s)
"Open Air" (DJ Heartstring Remix)	2022	TDJ featuring fknsyd
"Enjoy Your Life" (DJ Heartstring Remix)	2023	Romy
"In The City" (DJ Heartstring Remix)	2023	Charli XCX and Sam Smith
