= Need to Feel Loved =

2005 single by Reflekt

Single by Reflekt featuring Delline Bass
- Released: 21 February 2005
- Length: 3:22
- Label: Positiva
- Songwriters: Delline Bass; Julian Peake; Seb Fontaine; Thomas Newman
- Producers: Julian Peake; Seb Fontaine

Reflekt singles chronology
"Need to Feel Loved" (2005)	"Shine (Feels Like Home)" (2006)

"Need to Feel Loved" is the debut single of English electronic music duo Reflekt, featuring English singer Delline Bass on vocals. Released in February 2005, it reached number 14 on the UK Singles Chart and number one on the UK Dance Singles Chart in March 2005. It was featured in the 2005 British-Canadian film It's All Gone Pete Tong.

== Background and release ==
The song was originally released on Positiva Records. It was playlisted on BBC Radio 1 by Pete Tong and Judge Jules ahead of its commercial drop, helping build anticipation.

In early 2009, the song was reissued with new remixes, most prominently the Vocal Mix from Canadian DJ and music production duo Adam K & Soha, which was made available as a 1,000-copy digital exclusive on 23 February 2009 via DJdownload, followed by a limited 12-inch release on 2 March 2009. While the remix did not chart separately, it became an enduring club favourite – receiving heavy support from DJs such as Pete Tong, Judge Jules, and Above & Beyond – and has since amassed tens of millions of streams, often cited as the definitive version that reintroduced the record to a new generation of listeners.

== Content ==
The song samples "Ghosts", part of Thomas Newman's soundtrack to the 2002 film Road to Perdition.

== Track listings ==
UK CD single

1. "Need to Feel Loved" (radio edit) – 3:15
2. "Need to Feel Loved" (12-inch club mix) – 7:25
3. "Need to Feel Loved" (Seb Fontaine and Jay P's Type remix) – 8:30
4. "Need to Feel Loved" (Thrillseekers remix) – 8:11
5. "Need to Feel Loved" (Fuzzy Hair vocal mix) – 6:26
6. "Need to Feel Loved" (Horizontal mix) – 5:30

== Charts ==
Chart (2005)	Peak position
Belgium (Ultratip Bubbling Under Flanders)	3
Ireland (IRMA)	42
Netherlands (Dutch Top 40)	20
Netherlands (Single Top 100)	30
Scottish Singles Sales (Official Charts)	14
UK Singles (Official Charts)	14
UK Dance (Official Charts)	1

== Certifications ==
Region	Certification	Certified units/sales
United Kingdom (BPI)	Gold	400,000^{‡}
^{‡} Sales+streaming figures based on certification alone.
