= Seb Fontaine =

- Born: Jean-Sebastien Douglas Fontaine; 14 July 1970 (age 55); Hammersmith, London, England
- Genres: House
- Occupations: Disc jockey, producer
- Years active: 1989–present
- Labels: Global Underground, Virgin, Boxed, Perfecto, Thrive

Jean-Sebastien Douglas Fontaine (born 14 July 1970), known by his stage name Seb Fontaine, is an English electronic music producer and DJ.

== Biography ==
Fontaine had his first DJ gig at Crazy Larry's on the Kings Road, London, but he soon progressed to residency at the Fridge in Brixton in 1989.

Having worked at various other clubs in London (Subteranea, Billion Dollar Babes), he eventually became a resident DJ at one of the UK's largest night clubs at Cream, and also went on to feature at its Ibiza nights.

In 2000, he joined BBC Radio 1 as a specialist dance DJ, hosting a weekly show, as well as broadcasts from Radio 1 outside broadcasts in Ibiza, before leaving in 2004 and teaming up as Reflekt with Julian Peake.

He has also released a number of records, predominantly mix albums, and acted as a remix producer on tracks including the Outhere Brothers. He is also associated with the brand Type which he has used for naming both club nights and album releases.

== Discography ==
=== Albums ===
- 1999: Prototype
- 1999: Prototype, Vol. 2
- 2000: Prototype, Vol. 3
- 2001: Prototype, Vol. 4
- 2002: Horizons
- 2003: Perfecto Presents: Seb Fontaine
- 2004: Perfecto Presents: Type
- 2007: Type Vol. 2

=== Mixed compilations ===
- 1995: A Retrospective of House '91 - '95, Vol. 2
- 1996: Ministry of Sound Presents: One Half of a Whole Decade
- 1997: An Introspective of House: 1st Dimension
- 1997: An Introspective of House: 2nd Dimension
- 1997: An Introspective of House: Platinum
- 1998: Various - Elements (1st Testament) Mixed by Seb Fontaine and Tony De Vit
- 1998: Cream Anthems
- 1999: Cream Ibiza: Departures
- 2000: Cream Resident
- 2001: Creamfields
