= Eliza Rose =

English DJ, music producer and singer (born 1991)

- Born: 28 November 1991 (age 34)
- Origin: London, United Kingdom
- Genre: House
- Occupations: Singer; songwriter; record producer
- Instruments: Keyboards; vocals
- Years active: 2021–present

Eliza Rose (born 28 November 1991) is a British DJ, music producer and singer.

Born in the East End of London, Rose grew up in Dalston and began working at the Flashback Records shop when she was 14 years old. A fan of soul and jazz music, she sang from her youth, and began DJing in her late teens, once she had enough money to buy records, seeing it as a way to acquire more music. She attended college and university, and also took courses in music production. She presents a radio show for The Vinyl Factory, and recorded collaborations with a variety of other artists.

Interplanetary Criminal, a DJ and producer, sent Rose the song "B.O.T.A. (Baddest of Them All)", and she wrote lyrics for it, inspired by Pam Grier in the film Coffy. The song proved a surprise success, played heavily on the London club scene and then at the Glastonbury Festival 2022. It entered the UK Singles Chart on 29 July 2022, and in September it peaked at the summit of the chart. She became the first female DJ to top the UK Singles Chart since Sonique in 2000, as well as being the artist with the number one single in the United Kingdom on the day of the death of Queen Elizabeth II and start of the reign of King Charles III. In December 2022, it was certified platinum by the British Phonographic Industry (BPI).

Rose has also written a novel, What Happens in Dreamland.

== Discography ==
=== Extended plays ===
| Title | Details |
|---|---|
| Flame | Released: 26 August 2021; Label: Shake Records; Formats: Digital download, streaming |
| Shades of Red | Released: 25 March 2022; Label: Lobster Theremin; Formats: Digital download, streaming |

=== Singles ===
| Title | Year | Peak chart positions | | | | | | | | | | Certifications | Album |
| Title | Year | UK | AUS | AUT | CAN | GER | IRE | NL | NZ | SWE | SWI | Certifications | Album |
|---|---|---|---|---|---|---|---|---|---|---|---|---|---|
| "Delectable" (with M4A4) | 2022 | — | — | — | — | — | — | — | — | — | — | | Shades of Red |
| "Move to The" | 2022 | — | — | — | — | — | — | — | — | — | — | | Non-album singles |
| "B.O.T.A. (Baddest of Them All)" (with Interplanetary Criminal) | 2022 | 1 | 4 | 68 | 71 | 36 | 1 | 16 | 7 | 75 | 45 | BPI: 2× Platinum; ARIA: Platinum; MC: Gold; NVPI: Gold; RMNZ: 2× Platinum | Non-album singles |
| "Better Love" | 2023 | — | — | — | — | — | — | — | — | — | — | | Non-album singles |
| "Pleasure Peak" (with The Martinez Brothers) | 2023 | — | — | — | — | — | — | — | — | — | — | | Non-album singles |
| "Take You There" | 2023 | — | — | — | — | — | — | — | — | — | — | | Non-album singles |
| "Body Moving" (with Calvin Harris) | 2023 | 34 | — | — | — | — | 58 | — | — (Note: "Body Moving" did not enter the NZ Top 40 Singles Chart, but peaked at number 11 on the NZ Hot Singles Chart.) | — | — | BPI: Silver | 96 Months |
| "Business as Usual" (with MJ Cole) | 2024 | — | — | — | — | — | — | — | — | — | — | | Non-album single |
| "Slay the Beast" (with Or:la) | 2024 | — | — | — | — | — | — | — | — | — | — | | Trusting Theta |
| "DR Pleasure" (with Sally C) | 2024 | — | — | — | — | — | — | — | — | — | — | | DR Pleasure |
| "I Heart You" (with Confidence Man) | 2025 | — | — | — | — | — | — | — | — | — | — | | 4AM (La La La) |
| "Weekend" (featuring The Trip) | 2025 | — | — | — | — | — | — | — | — | — | — | | Non-album singles |
| "Too Slow (All Night)" (featuring Oppidan) | 2025 | — | — | — | — | — | — | — | — | — | — | | Non-album singles |
| "Pingers" (with CASISDEAD) | 2026 | — | — | — | — | — | — | — | — | — | — | | FABRICLIVE presents Eliza Rose |
| "Morning Light" | 2026 | — | — | — | — | — | — | — | — | — | — | | FABRICLIVE presents Eliza Rose |
"—" denotes a recording that did not chart or was not released.

== Awards and nominations ==
| Year | Organization | Work | Award | Result | Ref. |
|---|---|---|---|---|---|
| 2023 | Brit Awards | Eliza Rose | British Dance Act | Nominated | |
| 2023 | Brit Awards | "B.O.T.A. (Baddest of Them All)" | Song of the Year | Nominated | |
