= Swim (producer) =

Australian electronic producer

- Born: Hamish Lefevre; Melbourne, Australia
- Occupations: DJ; music producer
- Years active: 2020–present
- Labels: Swim

Hamish Lefevre, known professionally as Swim, is an Australian born, London based DJ and record producer.

In November 2025, they released their second album Dear Friend which debuted at number 22 on the ARIA Charts.

== Career ==
=== 2020-present: In Circles & Dear Friend ===
Swim's debut single "Time" was released in July 2020.

In April 2024, Swim released his debut album, In Circles. The album peaked at number 64 on the ARIA Charts.

In October 2025, Swim announced Dear Friend. The album peaked at number 22 on the ARIA Charts.

== Discography ==
=== Studio albums ===
List of studio albums, with selected details and peak chart positions
Title	Details	Peak chart positions
Title	Details	AUS
In Circles	Released: 12 April 2024; Format: LP, digital download; Label: Swim (SWIM001)	64
Dear Friend	Released: 21 November 2025; Format: LP, digital download; Label: Swim (SWIM002)	22

=== Mix Tapes ===
Title	Details
IDs [2022 - 2024]	Released: 6 September 2024; Format: digital download; Label: Swim

=== Extended Plays ===
Title	Details
11:11	Released: 11 November 2021; Format: digital download; Label: Swim
100 Years Good Luck (with Crush3d)	Released: 8 February 2024; Format: digital download; Label: Swim and Crush3d
Forever (with DJ Heartstring)	Released: 22 August 2025; Format: digital download; Label: DJ Heartstring and Swim
