= Eat, Sleep, Rave, Repeat =

2013 Single by Fatboy Slim and Riva Starr featuring Beardyman

Single by Fatboy Slim and Riva Starr featuring Beardyman
- Released: 20 June 2013; 27 October 2013 (remix)
- Genre: New rave, big beat
- Length: 4:45 (Calvin Harris Remix); 5:26 (Original Mix)
- Label: Skint; Spinnin'
- Songwriters: Norman Cook (Fatboy Slim); Stefano Miele; Darren Foreman
- Producers: Fatboy Slim; Riva Starr

Fatboy Slim singles chronology
"Machines Can Do the Work" (2010)	"Eat, Sleep, Rave, Repeat" (2013)	"Where U Iz" (2017)

Riva Starr singles chronology
"Kill Me" (2013)	"Eat, Sleep, Rave, Repeat" (2013)

"Eat, Sleep, Rave, Repeat" is a song by Fatboy Slim, Riva Starr and Beardyman. It features vocals from Beardyman who improvised all of the lyrics and vocals in one take. It was released on 20 June 2013. Aided by a remix by Calvin Harris, the song reached number 3 on the UK Singles Chart, becoming Fatboy Slim's first top ten hit since "Star 69" / "Weapon of Choice" in 2001. A remix by Dimitri Vegas & Like Mike and Ummet Ozcan was released on 23 December 2013.

== Music video ==
The lyric video for the original track was released on 24 June 2013. A music video to accompany the release of the Calvin Harris Remix was first released onto YouTube on 22 October 2013.

== Track listings ==
Digital download – Single
No.	Title	Length
1.	"Eat, Sleep, Rave, Repeat" (Calvin Harris Remix)	4:45

Digital download – EP
No.	Title	Length
1.	"Eat, Sleep, Rave, Repeat" (Calvin Harris Remix Edit)	2:48
2.	"Eat, Sleep, Rave, Repeat"	5:26
3.	"Eat, Sleep, Rave, Repeat" (clean version)	5:26
4.	"Eat, Sleep, Rave, Repeat" (acappella)	5:11

Digital download – Tomorrowland remix
No.	Title	Length
1.	"Eat, Sleep, Rave, Repeat" (Dimitri Vegas, Like Mike and Ummet Ozcan Tomorrowland Remix)	5:00

== Charts ==
=== Weekly charts ===
Weekly chart performance for "Eat, Sleep, Rave, Repeat"
Chart (2013–2014)	Peak position
Australia (ARIA)	47
Belgium (Ultratop 50 Flanders)	26
Belgium Dance (Ultratop Flanders)	9
Belgium (Ultratop 50 Wallonia)	24
Belgium Dance (Ultratop Wallonia)	17
France (SNEP)	96
Ireland (IRMA)	18
Mexico (Mexico Ingles Airplay)	39
Netherlands (Dutch Top 40)	8
Netherlands (Single Top 100)	2
Netherlands (Mega Dance Top 30)	2
Scottish Singles Sales (Official Charts)	1
UK Singles (Official Charts)	3
UK Dance (Official Charts)	1
UK Indie (Official Charts)	1

=== Year-end charts ===
2013 year-end chart performance for "Eat, Sleep, Rave, Repeat"
Chart (2013)	Position
Belgium Dance (Ultratop Flanders)	90
Netherlands (Dutch Top 40)	165
Netherlands (Mega Dance Top 30)	29

2014 year-end chart performance for "Eat, Sleep, Rave, Repeat"
Chart (2014)	Position
Belgium Dance (Ultratop Flanders)	77
Netherlands (Dutch Top 40)	63
Netherlands (Mega Dance Top 30)	35

== Certifications ==
Certifications for "Eat, Sleep, Rave, Repeat"
Region	Certification	Certified units/sales
United Kingdom (BPI)	Silver	200,000^{‡}
^{‡} Sales+streaming figures based on certification alone.
