= Plummet (group) =

American trance duo

Plummet was an American trance duo from Orlando, Florida. The act consisted of producer/remixer Eric B. Muniz (aka DJX) who originated from Sebring, Florida and female vocalist Cheramy Burgess. Burgess died in 2015.

They came to prominence in 2003 with their club cover version of Plumb's "Damaged", which took on a life of its own when it became a hit in the UK, peaking at number 12 on the UK Singles Chart.

The duo later saw success on home soil in the United States. Their covers of Sade's "Cherish the Day" in 2004, and Paul Simon's "50 Ways to Leave Your Lover" in 2005, became hits on the Billboard Hot Dance Airplay chart. "Cherish the Day" also reached number 35 on the UK chart. Another notable “Plummet” that shares the same name is based out of Midwest and is alternative rock that consists of 3 members.

== Discography ==
=== Singles ===
List of singles, with selected chart positions
Title	Year	Peak chart positions	
Title	Year	AUS	UK
"Damaged"	2003	39	12
"Cherish the Day"	2004	—	35
"50 Ways to Leave Your Lover"	2005	—	—
