= Patrick Topping =

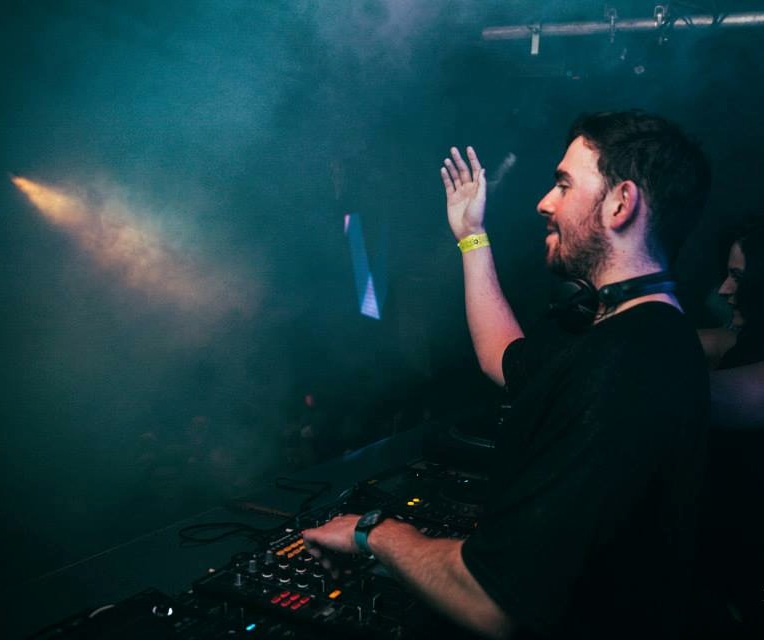

Background information
- Born: Newcastle Upon Tyne, England
- Genres: House, tech house, techno
- Occupations: Music producer; DJ
- Years active: 2012–present
- Labels: Trick; Hot Creations; Relief Records; Hottrax
- Website: www.patricktopping.co.uk

Patrick Topping is an English DJ, music producer and the owner of the record label company Trick. With releases on Hot Creations, Hottrax and Relief Records, Topping has hit number 1's on the Beatport Tech House charts, and received DJ Awards for Newcomer DJ and Track of the Season in Ibiza for his summer hit "Forget" in 2014. He won Best Tech House DJ award in 2018.

== Early life ==
In 2008 Topping attended the White Isle in Ibiza and was blown away. In an interview Topping explained: "I knew I needed to come back every year, but there's no way I could afford to do that. So I thought to myself, I'll have to be a DJ!". During Christmas of that year Topping received a DJ deck. The following summer Topping enrolled in Point blank music school's online minimal techno course.

Topping studied at the University of Edinburgh before starting a career as a DJ.

== Musical career ==
Topping has built on his DJ career, from playing gigs at his own hometown club night formally known as Motion at Digital (Newcastle) to playing at clubs across the world including: Tomorrowland (Belgium), Awakenings (Netherlands), Winter Music Conference in Miami. In addition to this he holds a summer residency for Paradise at Ibiza's DC10.

Patrick started his own label TRICK in early 2019 with his own release Watch What Ya Doing. As well a holding close ties with Jamie Jones' Hot Creations label and his first BBC Radio 1 Essential Mix was broadcast in 2015. He has helped many new artists, including Ewan Mcvicar with his release, Tell Me Something Good.

In October 2020, he collaborated with his wife Hayley Topping for the single "New Reality" which was Annie Mac's Hottest Record in the World for BBC Radio 1.

In 2022, Topping and his Label Trick held a residency at Ibiza's DC10 for 9 weeks.

He won DJ Mag 'Best of British' DJ of the year in December 2022.

== Discography ==
=== EPs ===
- Patrick Topping – Walk On E.P
- Patrick Topping – Any Amounts EP [Hot Creations HOT037]
- Patrick Topping – Get Beasty EP [Hot Creations HOT042]
- Patrick Topping – Holiday [Defected Miami 2014]
- Patrick Topping – Too Much [Hot Creations Hot Summer Jams – HOTCCD004]
- Patrick Topping – Boxed Off EP [Hot Creations HOTC045]
- Patrick Topping – Taking Libz [Hot Creations HOTC082]
- Patrick Topping – Baddie EP [Repopulate Mars RPM002]
- Patrick Topping – Yes Chief [Kaluki Music 2017]
- Patrick Topping – Be Sharp Say Nowt [Hot Creations]
- Patrick Topping – Watch What Ya Doing [TRICK]
- Patrick Topping – Dungeon Freak [TRICK]
- Patrick Topping – Rocket Fuel [TRICK]

=== Remixes ===
- Calvin Harris (with Dua Lipa) – One Kiss (Patrick Topping Remix)
- Steve Lawler – Do Ya (Patrick Topping Remix) [VIVa MUSiC – VIVA106]
- Sidney Charles – 303 Love Storey Feat. Hector Moralez (Patrick Topping Remix) [Avotre – AVOTRE010]
- Leon – Bloosh (Patrick Topping Remix) [D-FLOOR Music – DFL006]
- Yousef – For The Terraces (Patrick Topping Remix) [Circus Recordings – CIRCUS037]
- Cuartero & wAFF – Break A Sweat (Patrick Topping Remix) [Moon Harbor Recordings – MHR073]
- Coyu & Edu Imbernon – El Baile Aleman (Patrick Topping Remix) – [SUARA]
- Raumakustik – Dem A Pree (Patrick Topping Remix) – [Emerald City Music – EC007]
- Bookashade – Nightfalls (Patrick Topping Remix)
- Robyn – Ever Again (Patrick Topping Remix)

=== Collaborations ===
- Green Velvet & Patrick Topping – Voicemail [Relief Records – RR2072]
- Green Velvet & Patrick Topping – When Is Now EP [Relief Records – RR2081]

=== Mixes ===
- Patrick Topping – Essential Mix 18/04/15
