= Interplanetary Criminal =

English DJ and producer (born 1993)

- Born: Zachary Koa Bruce; 16 December 1993 (age 32); Blackburn, England
- Origin: Manchester, England
- Genres: Electronic; UK garage; speed garage; breakbeat
- Years active: 2012–present
- Website: www.interplanetarycriminal.com

Zachary Koa Bruce (born 1993), known professionally as Interplanetary Criminal, is a British musician and DJ.

He rose to international prominence following the release of the 2022 single "B.O.T.A. (Baddest of Them All)" with Eliza Rose, which reached number one on the UK Singles Chart and was certified 2× platinum.

== History ==
Bruce was born in 1993 in Blackburn to a half-Singaporean mother. As a child, Bruce briefly lived in Liverpool before moving to Bolton, Greater Manchester. Bruce began DJing and producing around 2012 while studying at the School of Sound Recording, producing dark breakbeat records. He began producing lo-fi house after moving to Leeds, inspired by artists like Mall Grab and DJ Seinfeld.

In 2016, he returned to Manchester and began releasing UK garage tracks via SoundCloud. His debut EP, Intergalactic Jack, was released in 2017 via E‑Beamz, followed by multiple EPs on independent UK labels including Shall Not Fade and Timeisnow. In 2019, Bruce co‑founded ATW Records with friend and producer Main Phase, as a platform for contemporary UK garage and breakbeat.

His major breakthrough arrived in 2022 when he produced "B.O.T.A. (Baddest of Them All)" with Eliza Rose, released independently on 15 June 2022 via Rosebud Recordings. Later licensed to Warner Records, the track became viral on TikTok, and topped the UK Singles Chart for two weeks. "B.O.T.A. (Baddest of Them All)" was the number one single in the United Kingdom on the day of the death of Queen Elizabeth II and the ascension of King Charles III. For the record, the duo were nominated for BRIT Award for Song of the Year. The track was later certified 2× platinum by the British Phonographic Industry (BPI).

In 2025, Bruce won the Juno Award for Dance Recording of the Year, for his track "No Time" featuring SadBoi.

== Discography ==
=== Albums ===
- Get Money (Dansu Discs, 16 November 2018)

=== Compilation albums ===
- All Thru the Night (Locked On, 17 March 2023)

=== Extended plays ===
- Intergalactic Jack (E-Beamz, 6 February 2017)
- Out of Body (Kalahari Oyster Cult, 17 July 2017)
- Confused (Dansu Discs, 25 May 2018)
- Sleepwalker (Sneaker Social Club, 29 November 2019)
- Move Tools (Banoffee Pies, 20 December 2019)
- Nobody (Timeisnow, 3 April 2020)
- Darkside (Timeisnow, 4 September 2020)
- Warehouse Romance (Warehouse Rave, 18 December 2020)
- In My Arms (19 March 2021)
- Dangerous (Instinct, 30 April 2021)
- Ruff (with DJ Cosworth) (Timeisnow, 13 August 2021)
- ATW002 (with Main Phase) (ATW Records, 25 February 2022)

=== Singles ===
- "Mind Games" (5 April 2019)
- "The Way" (14 February 2020)
- "Crazy" (17 April 2020)
- "Loss of Self Identity" (24 July 2020)
- "Talboat Road" (26 February 2021)
- "Higher" (with Groovy D & Anna Straker) (30 April 2021)
- "Trust Me" (with DJ Cosworth) (13 August 2021)
- "Why" (11 March 2022)
- "B.O.T.A. (Baddest of Them All)" (with Eliza Rose) (15 June 2022)
- "No Time" (with SadBoi) (14 June 2024)
- "Damager" (with Sammy Virji) (Capitol Records, 15 November 2024)
- "Yosemite" (with KETTAMA) (13 December 2024)
- "Slow Burner" (with Original Koffee) (30 May 2025)
- "Fón Póca" (with Travy) (29 August 2025)
- "Lose My Mind" (with Champion, Crookers) (2 October 2025)
- "Dot Dot (IPC VIP MIX)" (with Kwengface, Flowdan) (28 November 2025)
- "Contact" (with Gorgon City) (9 January 2026)
- "Twizted" (with Main Phase) (22 May 2026)
- "Lola" (17 July 2026)
- "HOLD DA PHONE" (with Silva Bumpa) (21 August 2026)
