= Reflekt =

English electronic music group

- Origin: England, United Kingdom
- Genres: House; French house; nu-disco; alternative dance
- Instruments: Keyboards, turntables
- Years active: 2004–2012
- Members: Seb Fontaine; Julian Peake

Reflekt were an English electronic music duo consisting of DJ/remixer/producers Seb Fontaine and Julian Peake (aka Jay P. or Jules Vern – one half of Stretch & Vern).

== Biography ==
Reflekt are best known for their 2004 club hit "Need to Feel Loved", which reached number 1 on the British Dance Chart. The song sampled "Ghosts", part of the soundtrack to the 2002 film The Road to Perdition, and it was featured in the 2005 British/Canadian film It's All Gone Pete Tong. "Need to Feel Loved" reached number 14 on the UK Singles Chart in March 2005.

== Discography ==
=== Singles ===
List of singles as lead artist, with selected chart positions and certifications, showing year released and album name
Title	Year	Peak chart positions					Certifications	Album
Title	Year	BEL	NLD	SCO	UK	UK Dance	Certifications	Album
"Need to Feel Loved" (featuring Delline Bass)	2004	53	30	14	14	1	BPI: Gold	Non-album singles
"Shine (Feels Like Home)"	2006	—	—	—	—	—		Non-album singles
"A Beautiful House" (featuring Kim Wilde)	2012	—	—	—	—	—		Non-album singles
"—" denotes a recording that did not chart or was not released in that territory.
