= ARIA Dance Singles Chart =

Australian music chart

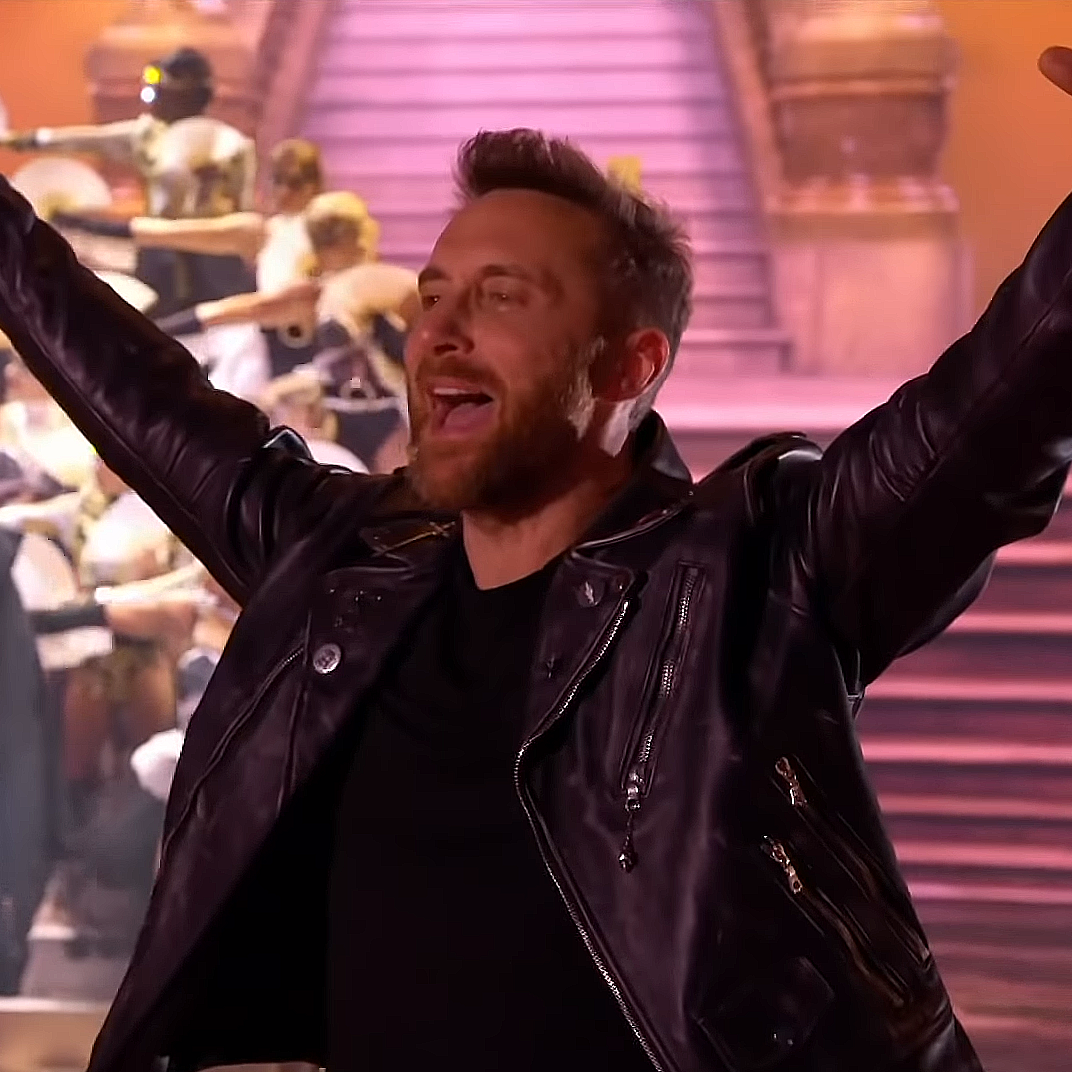
David Guetta holds the record for the most number ones on the chart

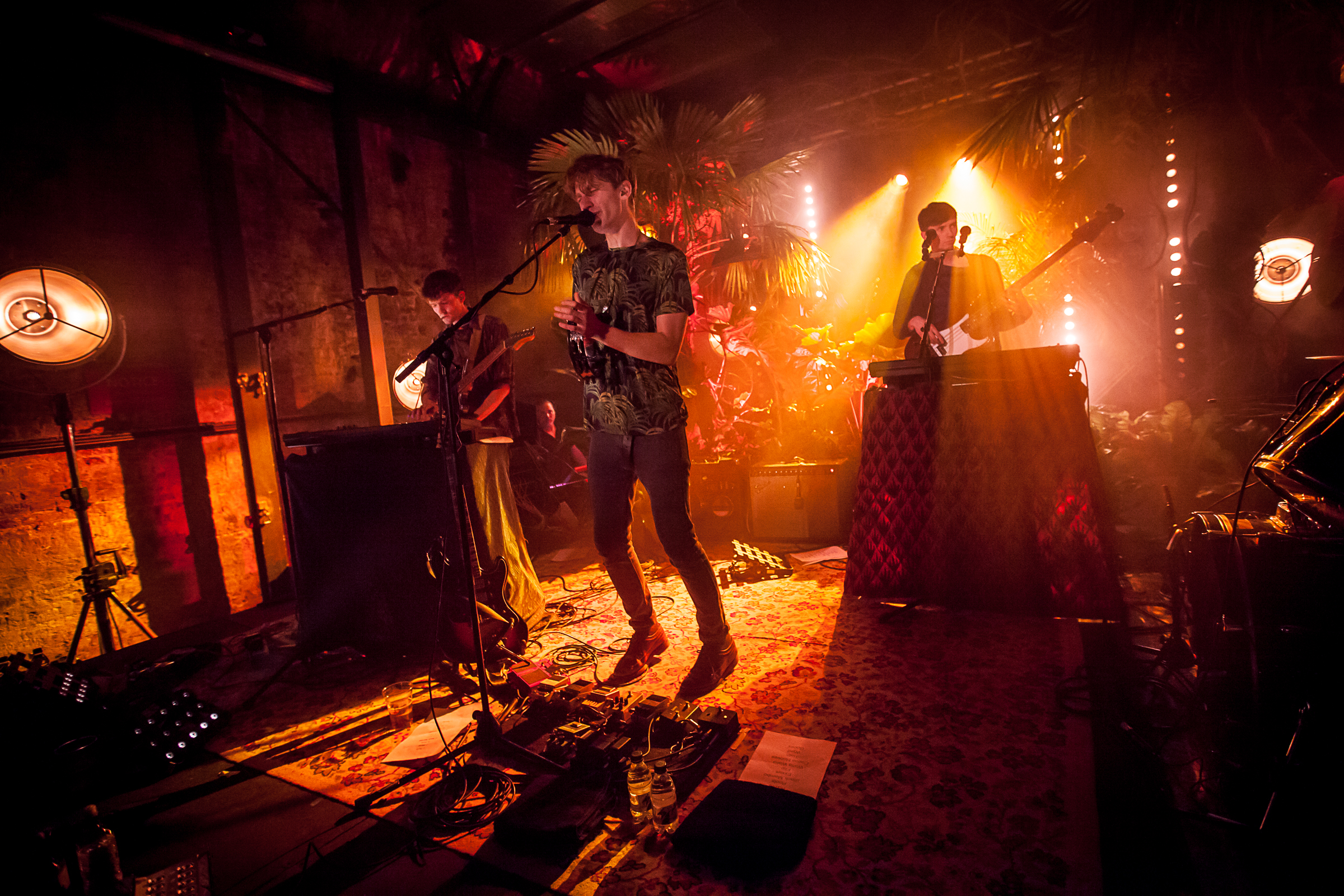
Glass Animals holds the record for the most weeks at number-one with one track on the chart

The ARIA Dance Singles Chart ranks the best performing dance music tracks within Australia and is provided by the Australian Recording Industry Association.

== History ==
The Dance Singles Chart was established in 2001 and first published on 1 January. The chart still runs weekly as of 20 November 2026.The current number one is "Movin' to the Sun" by Hugel, Imael Angel and Ultra Naté.

== Trivia ==
=== Songs with the most weeks at number one ===
86 weeks

- Glass Animals – "Heat Waves" (2021–23)

66 weeks

- Disco Lines and Tinashe – "No Broke Boys" (2025–26)

28 weeks

- David Guetta and Bebe Rexha – "I'm Good (Blue)" (2022–23)
- Cassö, Raye and D-Block Europe – "Prada" (2023–24)

25 weeks

- Saint Jhn and Imanbek – "Roses (Imanbek remix)" (2020)

24 weeks

- Bl3ss and CamrinWatsin featuring bbyclose – "Kisses" (2024–25)

23 weeks

- Joel Corry and MNEK – "Head & Heart" (2020–2021)

20 weeks

- Regard – "Ride It" (2019–2020)

19 weeks

- Las Ketchup – "The Ketchup Song (Aserejé)" (2002–2003)
- Cyril – "Stumblin' In" (2024–25)

=== Artists with the most number ones ===
This list includes main artists and featured artists.

- David Guetta (11)
- Calvin Harris (10)
- Britney Spears (6)
- Kylie Minogue (6)
- Lady Gaga (6)
- Clean Bandit (4)
- Flume (4)
- Kesha (4)
- Madonna (4)
- The Chainsmokers (3)
- Jonas Blue (3)
- Ricki-Lee (3)
- Sia (3)
- Justin Timberlake (3)

=== Cumulative weeks at number one ===
- Glass Animals (86)
- Disco Lines (66)
- Tinashe (66)
- David Guetta (65)
- Calvin Harris (64)
- Britney Spears (44)
- Lady Gaga (39)
- Bebe Rexha (26)
- Cassö (26)
- D-Block Europe (26)
- Raye (26)

== See also ==
- ARIA Charts
