= Irish Homegrown chart =

The Irish Homegrown Chart (also known as Irish Homegrown Top 20) is a chart of best-selling Irish releases in Ireland. It is issued weekly by the Irish Recorded Music Association (IRMA) and complied on its behalf by Official Charts Company.

The first chart was released on 7 June 2019 and the first number-one was "Prefontaine" by Versatile

As of the issue dated 20 November 2026, the current number-one single on the chart is "Japan" by Fontaines D.C..

== Methodology ==
To chart artists must hold an Irish Passport, only one track per artist is allowed, only a track from the last year is eligible and every track can only be on the chart for thirteen weeks.

== Publication ==
A new chart is compiled and released to the public by IRMA each Friday at 15:00 GMT.Each chart is dated with the "week-ending" database of the previous Thursday. Midweek versions of the chart are produced every day, allowing record companies and retailers to track sales trends. Upon its publication, The Irish Homegrown singles Chart is released as a Top 20—featuring the twenty best-selling Irish singles.

== See also ==
- Irish Singles Chart
