= Emil Nava =

British music video director (born 1985)

- Born: Emil William Capper Nava; 29 March 1985 (age 41); London, England
- Occupation: Music video director
- Relatives: Jake Nava (half-brother)
- Website: emilnava.com

Emil William Capper Nava (born 29 March 1985) is a British music video director.

After leaving school at 16, Emil started his career as a chef. He shot to fame after directing Jessie J's song "Do It Like A Dude". He has since directed over 100 music videos for global musicians such as Jessie J, LunchMoney Lewis, Calvin Harris, Jennifer Lopez, Ellie Goulding, Rita Ora, Alesso, Juicy J, Ed Sheeran, Zara Larsson, PrettyMuch, Nick Jonas, Bebe Rexha, Camila Cabello, Liam Payne, Charlie Puth, Julia Michaels, Hailee Steinfeld, Dua Lipa, Selena Gomez, Pharrell, T.I., Ne-Yo, Taio Cruz, Rudimental and Post Malone among others. In 2019, Emil founded Ammolite, Inc., a creative and production studio in Los Angeles, California.

He is the younger half-brother of fellow director Jake Nava.

== Music videos ==
| Year | Title | Artist(s) | Notes and refs. |
|---|---|---|---|
| 2008 | "Strobelight" | Luigi Masi | |
| 2008 | "Touch You" | DMT | |
| 2008 | "Take Me Back" | Tinchy Stryder ft. Taio Cruz | |
| 2009 | "Number 1" | Tinchy Stryder ft. N-Dubz | |
| 2009 | "Our House is Dadless" | Kid British | |
| 2009 | "Never Leave You" | Tinchy Stryder ft. Amelle Berrabah | |
| 2009 | "Say It" | Booty Luv | |
| 2009 | "Get Sexy" | Sugababes | |
| 2009 | "You're Not Alone" | Tinchy Stryder | |
| 2009 | "More Than One Way" | Kano | |
| 2010 | "My Baby Left Me" | Rox | |
| 2010 | "Candy" | Aggro Santos ft. Kimberly Wyatt | |
| 2010 | "Hearts Don't Lie" | Gabriella Cilmi | |
| 2010 | "In My System" | Tinchy Stryder | |
| 2010 | "Defender" | Gabriella Cilmi | |
| 2010 | "Runaway" | Devlin | |
| 2010 | "Second Chance" | Tinchy Stryder ft. Taio Cruz | |
| 2010 | "Do It Like A Dude" | Jessie J | Q Award Best Video |
| 2011 | "Price Tag" | Jessie J ft. B.o.B | |
| 2011 | "Finish Line" | Yasmin | |
| 2011 | "Nobody's Perfect" | Jessie J | |
| 2011 | "Do It In The AM" | Frankmusik ft. Far East Movement | |
| 2011 | "You Need Me, I Don't Need You" | Ed Sheeran | |
| 2011 | "Who's Laughing Now" | Jessie J | |
| 2011 | "Who You Are" | Jessie J | |
| 2011 | "Lego House" | Ed Sheeran | |
| 2011 | "Love You So" | Delilah | |
| 2012 | "R.I.P." | Rita Ora ft. Tinie Tempah | |
| 2012 | "Laserlight" | Jessie J ft. David Guetta | |
| 2012 | "Picking Up the Pieces" | Paloma Faith | |
| 2012 | "Small Bump" | Ed Sheeran | |
| 2012 | "30 Minute Love Affair" | Paloma Faith | |
| 2012 | "Turn Back" | K Koke ft. Maverick Sabre | |
| 2012 | "Shine Ya Light" | Rita Ora | |
| 2012 | "Just Be" | Paloma Faith | |
| 2012 | "Give Me Love" | Ed Sheeran | |
| 2012 | "Perfect Replacement" | Example | |
| 2013 | "Attracting Flies" | AlunaGeorge | |
| 2013 | "I Need Your Love" | Calvin Harris ft. Ellie Goulding | |
| 2013 | "What Love Is Made Of" | Katy B | |
| 2013 | "Wild" | Jessie J ft. Big Sean, Dizzee Rascal | |
| 2013 | "Exotic" | Priyanka Chopra ft. Pitbull | |
| 2013 | "Trouble" | Neon Jungle | |
| 2013 | "Mad Love" | Elli Ingram | |
| 2013 | "It’s My Party" | Jessie J | |
| 2013 | "All The Wrong Places" | Example | |
| 2013 | "Under Control" | Calvin Harris & Alesso ft. Hurts | |
| 2013 | "Make Out" | Rixton | |
| 2013 | "Thunder" | Jessie J | |
| 2013 | "Braveheart" | Neon Jungle | |
| 2013 | "Lover Not a Fighter" | Tinie Tempah ft. Labrinth | |
| 2013 | "Recovery" | James Arthur | |
| 2014 | "Wrong or Right" | Kwabs | |
| 2014 | "When It Was Dark" | Elli Ingram | |
| 2014 | "Last Night" | The Vamps | |
| 2014 | "Summer" | Calvin Harris | |
| 2014 | "Luxury" | Nic Goose | |
| 2014 | "Pray For Love" | Kwabs | |
| 2014 | "Carry You Home" | Zara Larsson | |
| 2014 | "Sing" | Ed Sheeran ft. Pharrell Williams | MTV Video Music Award Best Male Video |
| 2014 | "Somebody to You" | The Vamps & Demi Lovato | |
| 2014 | "Emotions" | Jennifer Lopez | |
| 2014 | "Worry No More" | Jennifer Lopez ft. Rick Ross | Album teaser |
| 2014 | "Disappointed" | Chlöe Howl | |
| 2014 | "Booty" | Jennifer Lopez ft. Pitbull | |
| 2014 | "Get Hurt" | The Gaslight Anthem | |
| 2014 | "Rollin' And Tumblin'" | The Gaslight Anthem | |
| 2014 | "Don't" | Ed Sheeran | |
| 2014 | "Blame" | Calvin Harris ft. John Newman | |
| 2014 | "Thinking Out Loud" | Ed Sheeran | |
| 2014 | "She Knows" | Ne-Yo ft. Juicy J | |
| 2014 | "Heroes (We Could Be)" | Alesso ft. Tove Lo | |
| 2014 | "Slow Acid" | Calvin Harris | |
| 2014 | "Open Wide" | Calvin Harris ft. Big Sean | |
| 2014 | "Outside" | Calvin Harris ft. Ellie Goulding | |
| 2014 | "Lunch Money" | Pusha T | |
| 2015 | "Pray to God" | Calvin Harris ft. Haim | |
| 2015 | "Bills" | LunchMoney Lewis | |
| 2015 | "Hold My Hand" | Jess Glynne | |
| 2015 | "Cool" | Alesso ft. Roy English | |
| 2015 | "Bloodstream" | Ed Sheeran & Rudimental | |
| 2015 | "Private Show" | T.I. ft. Chris Brown | |
| 2015 | "Photograph" | Ed Sheeran | |
| 2015 | "Timebomb" | Tove Lo | |
| 2015 | "How Deep Is Your Love" | Calvin Harris & Disciples | MTV Video Music Award Best Electronic Video |
| 2015 | "On My Mind" | Ellie Goulding | |
| 2015 | "Player" | Tinashe ft. Chris Brown | |
| 2015 | "Lay It All On Me" | Rudimental ft. Ed Sheeran | |
| 2016 | "Real Love" | Florrie | |
| 2016 | "I'm in Control" | AlunaGeorge ft. Popcaan | |
| 2016 | "Beauty Queen" | Burns | |
| 2016 | "Best Fake Smile" | James Bay | |
| 2016 | "Hotter Than Hell" | Dua Lipa | |
| 2016 | "Lost Boy" | Ruth B | |
| 2016 | "Kill Em with Kindness" | Selena Gomez | |
| 2016 | "This Is What You Came For" | Calvin Harris ft. Rihanna | MTV Video Music Award Best Male Video |
| 2016 | "Hype" | Dizzee Rascal & Calvin Harris | |
| 2016 | "Talk" | DJ Snake ft. George Maple | |
| 2016 | "Olé" | John Newman | |
| 2016 | "In The Name Of Love" | Martin Garrix & Bebe Rexha | |
| 2016 | "A-List" | WSTRN | |
| 2016 | "Still Falling for You" | Ellie Goulding | |
| 2016 | "Ain't My Fault" | Zara Larsson | |
| 2016 | "My Way" | Calvin Harris | |
| 2016 | "So Good" | Louisa Johnson | |
| 2017 | "Back to Beautiful" | Sofia Carson ft. Alan Walker | |
| 2017 | "FFF" | Bebe Rexha ft. G-Eazy | |
| 2017 | "Chasing Flies" | Tinie Tempah ft. Nea | |
| 2017 | "Remember Me" | Jennifer Hudson | |
| 2017 | "Attention" | Charlie Puth | |
| 2017 | "Crying in the Club" | Camila Cabello | |
| 2017 | "Strip That Down" | Liam Payne ft. Quavo | |
| 2017 | "Gone" | Jack & Jack | long form video |
| 2017 | "Something in the Way You Move" | Ellie Goulding | version 2 |
| 2017 | "Feels" | Calvin Harris ft. Pharrell Williams, Katy Perry, Big Sean | both versions |
| 2017 | "Ni Tú Ni Yo" | Jennifer Lopez ft. Gente de Zona | |
| 2017 | "Uh Huh" | Julia Michaels | |
| 2017 | "Find You" | Nick Jonas | |
| 2017 | "Would You Mind" | PrettyMuch | |
| 2017 | "How Long" | Charlie Puth | |
| 2017 | "Faking It" | Calvin Harris ft. Kehlani, Lil Yachty | |
| 2017 | "Beg" | Jack & Jack | |
| 2017 | "Let Me Go" | Hailee Steinfeld & Alesso ft. Florida Georgia Line & watt | |
| 2017 | "Growing Pains" | L Devine | visual EP |
| 2017 | "Rockstar" | Post Malone ft. 21 Savage | |
| 2017 | "No More" | PrettyMuch ft. French Montana | |
| 2018 | "Like You Like That" | L Devine | |
| 2018 | "Nuh Ready Nuh Ready" | Calvin Harris ft. PartyNextDoor | |
| 2018 | "River" | Eminem ft. Ed Sheeran | |
| 2018 | "Happier" | Ed Sheeran | |
| 2018 | "One Kiss" | Calvin Harris & Dua Lipa | |
| 2018 | "Hands On Me" | Burns & Maluma & Rae Sremmurd | |
| 2018 | "Karma Club" | Folly Rae | visual EP |
| 2018 | "Promises" | Calvin Harris, Sam Smith | |
| 2018 | "Peer Pressure" | L Devine | |
| 2018 | "Can't Be You" | L Devine | |
| 2018 | "Nervous" | L Devine | |
| 2018 | "Peer Pressure (The Film)" | L Devine | short film |
| 2018 | "Giant" | Calvin Harris, Rag'n'Bone Man | |
| 2019 | "Waves" | Normani ft. 6LACK | |
| 2019 | "Undrunk" | Fletcher | co-director: Grace Pickering |
| 2019 | "If You're Gonna Lie" | Fletcher | co-director: Grace Pickering |
| 2019 | "I Don't Care" | Ed Sheeran & Justin Bieber | |
| 2019 | "Bruises" | Lewis Capaldi | |
| 2019 | "Talk" | Khalid | |
| 2020 | "iPhone" | Rico Nasty | |
| 2020 | "Wow" | Zara Larsson | |
| 2020 | "Worry About Me" | Ellie Goulding ft. Blackbear | |
| 2021 | "My Head & My Heart" | Ava Max | |
| 2021 | "By Your Side" | Calvin Harris ft. Tom Grennan | |
| 2021 | "Tick Tock" | Young Thug | |
| 2022 | "Stay with Me" | Calvin Harris ft. Justin Timberlake, Halsey and Pharrell Williams | |
| 2022 | "The Joker and the Queen" | Ed Sheeran ft. Taylor Swift | |
| 2023 | "Don't Say Love" | Leigh-Anne | |
| 2024 | "Somebody Save Me" | Eminem ft. Jelly Roll | |
| 2025 | "Old Phone" | Ed Sheeran | |
| 2025 | "A Little More" | Ed Sheeran | |
| 2025 | "Camera" | Ed Sheeran | |
