= Rollin (Calvin Harris song) =

Single by Calvin Harris featuring Future and Khalid

from the album Funk Wav Bounces Vol. 1
- Released: 12 May 2017
- Recorded: 2016
- Studio: God's Eyes (Los Angeles, California); 11th Street (Atlanta, Georgia)
- Genre: Synth-funk
- Length: 4:32: 3:56 (radio edit)
- Label: Columbia
- Songwriters: Adam Wiles; Nayvadius Wilburn; Khalid Robinson
- Producer: Calvin Harris

Calvin Harris singles chronology
"Heatstroke" (2017)	"Rollin" (2017)	"Feels" (2017)

Future singles chronology
"Mask Off" (2017)	"Rollin" (2017)	"Pie" (2017)

Khalid singles chronology
"1-800-273-8255" (2017)	"Rollin" (2017)	"Young Dumb & Broke" (2017)

"Rollin" is a song by Scottish DJ and record producer Calvin Harris featuring American rapper Future and American singer Khalid. It is the third single from Harris' fifth studio album, Funk Wav Bounces Vol. 1 (2017), following "Slide" and "Heatstroke". It was released on 12 May 2017 through Sony Music.

== Critical reception ==
Pitchfork praised the track, saying Harris is "producing full-on swing jams like its second nature. Harris has proven to be a more than capable manager," further stating that "not only is Calvin Harris making pop funky again; he’s surpassing DJ Khaled as a pop-rap maestro."

== Credits and personnel ==
Credits adapted from the song's liner notes.

- Calvin Harris – Production, Yamaha C7 Piano, Ibanez 1200 Bass, Roland Jupiter-8, Fender Rhodes, PPG Wave 2.2, Linn LM-2, 1965 Fender Stratocaster, ARP String Ensemble PE IV, mixing, recording
- Future – vocals
- Khalid – vocals
- Seth Firkins – recording
- Dave Kutch – mastering

== Charts ==
Chart (2017)	Peak position
Australia (ARIA)	40
Canada Hot 100 (Billboard)	36
Czech Republic Singles Digital (ČNS IFPI)	45
France (SNEP)	38
Germany (GfK)	94
Hungary (Stream Top 40)	39
Ireland (IRMA)	23
Netherlands (Single Top 100)	58
New Zealand (Recorded Music NZ)	34
Portugal (AFP)	40
Scottish Singles Sales (Official Charts)	22
Slovakia Singles Digital (ČNS IFPI)	46
Sweden (Sverigetopplistan)	67
Switzerland (Schweizer Hitparade)	73
UK Singles (Official Charts)	43
US Billboard Hot 100	62
US Hot Dance/Electronic Songs (Billboard)	8
US Rhythmic Airplay (Billboard)	26

=== Year-end charts ===
Chart (2017)	Position
US Hot Dance/Electronic Songs (Billboard)	22

== Certifications ==
Region	Certification	Certified units/sales
Australia (ARIA)	Platinum	70,000^{‡}
Canada (Music Canada)	3× Platinum	240,000^{‡}
Denmark (IFPI Danmark)	Gold	45,000^{‡}
Mexico (AMPROFON)	Gold	30,000^{‡}
New Zealand (RMNZ)	2× Platinum	60,000^{‡}
Sweden (GLF)	Gold	20,000^{‡}
United Kingdom (BPI)	Silver	200,000^{‡}
United States (RIAA)	2× Platinum	2,000,000^{‡}
^{‡} Sales+streaming figures based on certification alone.

== Release history ==
Country	Date	Format	Label	Ref.
Various	12 May 2017	Digital download	Columbia	
United Kingdom	2 June 2017	Urban contemporary radio	Columbia	
United States	27 June 2017	Rhythmic contemporary radio	Columbia	
