= Motion (Calvin Harris album) =

2014 studio album by Calvin Harris

Studio album by Calvin Harris
- Released: 31 October 2014
- Recorded: 2013–2014
- Studios: Fly Eye (London) (Note: All tracks); EMI (London) (Note: Track 2); Alesso (Stockholm); Miloco Arcadium (London) (Note: Track 3); Disturbing London (London) (Note: Track 4); Ummet Ozcan (Amsterdam) (Note: Track 9); Henson (Los Angeles) (Note: Track 11); Kingston Sound (Los Angeles) (Note: Track 13); R3hab Productions (Breda, Netherlands) (Note: Track 14)
- Genres: EDM; electro house
- Length: 55:46
- Labels: Fly Eye; Columbia
- Producers: Alesso; Calvin Harris; Firebeatz; Ummet Ozcan; R3hab

Calvin Harris chronology
18 Months (2012)	Motion (2014)	Funk Wav Bounces Vol. 1 (2017)

Singles from Motion
- 1. "Under Control" Released: 7 October 2013; 2. "Summer" Released: 14 March 2014; 3. "Blame" Released: 5 September 2014; 4. "Outside" Released: 20 October 2014; 5. "Open Wide" Released: 27 January 2015; 6. "Pray to God" Released: 6 March 2015

Motion is the fourth studio album by the Scottish DJ and record producer Calvin Harris, released on 31 October 2014 by Fly Eye and Columbia Records. The album includes collaborations with Ellie Goulding, Gwen Stefani, John Newman, Tinashe, Big Sean, Alesso, R3hab, Ummet Ozcan, Firebeatz, Hurts, Haim and All About She.

The album received mixed responses from critics. Motion debuted at number two on the UK Albums Chart, with 37,325 copies sold in its first week. It debuted at number five on the Billboard 200 in the United States, and became Harris's second consecutive number-one album on the Dance/Electronic Albums chart. The album's first three singles—"Under Control", "Summer" and "Blame"—all topped the UK Singles Chart. Other singles released from the album include "Outside", "Open Wide" and "Pray to God".

== Background ==
The album's title, artwork and release date were officially revealed on 25 September 2014. On 5 October, Harris took to Twitter to announce a list of collaborators on the album, including Ellie Goulding, Ummet Ozcan, Big Sean, R3hab, Gwen Stefani, Haim, Tinashe and All About She. Billboard referred to the album as "playing it safe" as a result of its "radio friendly" and "it–girl" collaborations and cited the album as featuring "crowd pleasers". Additionally, they praised Harris's production ability on Motion with tracks such as "Slow Acid" being marked a shift away from his "signature club anthems". The albums released was preceded by the single "Under Control", a collaboration between Harris and Swedish DJ Alesso featuring Theo Hutchcraft on vocals. The single was a commercial success, reaching number one on the singles charts in the United Kingdom as well as in his native Scotland, and was subsequently certified Platinum in both the United Kingdom and United States.

Motion debuted atop the albums charts in his native Scotland, as well as on the Dance Albums Charts in the United Kingdom and the Billboard Top Dance Albums in the United States. It finished 2014 as the 42nd best selling album of the year in the United Kingdom, and was subsequently certified Platinum by the British Phonographic Industry in the territory for sales in excess of 300,000 copies. It was also certified Platinum in the United States, Australia and New Zealand, whilst in Brazil it was certified Diamond by Pro-Música Brasil. It was nominated for Top Dance/Electronic Album at the 2015 Billboard Music Awards, and won the award for Foreign Electronic Music Album or Voice Recording at the 2015 Hungarian Music Awards.

== Singles ==
"Under Control", a collaborative track with Swedish DJ Alesso and English duo Hurts, was released on 7 October 2013 as the first single from Motion. The song debuted at number one on the UK Singles Chart, and charted inside the top 10 in Finland, Ireland, Norway and Sweden. "Summer" was released on 14 March 2014 as the album's second single. It reached number one in the United Kingdom and Ireland, and charted within the top five in countries such as Australia, Canada, Germany, Norway and Sweden. It also became Harris's highest-charting solo single on the Billboard Hot 100 at the time, peaking at number seven.

"Blame" features vocals from English singer John Newman and was released on 7 September 2014 as the album's third single. The song earned Harris his fifth number-one single as a lead artist (and seventh in total) on the UK Singles Chart. Internationally, "Blame" peaked at number one in Finland, Norway and Sweden, and reached number 19 on the Billboard Hot 100. "Outside" was released on 20 October 2014 as the album's fourth single, featuring English singer Ellie Goulding. The single reached number six on the UK Singles Chart. It also peaked at number one in Germany and Finland, while charting inside the top five in Ireland, Norway and Sweden, the top 10 in Australia and New Zealand, and the top 30 in the United States.

"Open Wide", which features Big Sean, was originally released as the second promotional single from the album on 27 October 2014. It is a vocal mix of the instrumental track "C.U.B.A", which was released on Beatport on 21 July 2014. The song peaked at number 23 on the UK Singles Chart. "Open Wide" was sent to rhythmic contemporary radio in the United States on 27 January 2015 as the album's fifth single. "Pray to God", featuring American band Haim, was released on 6 March 2015 as the album's sixth and final single overall. The song reached number 10 on the Australian Singles Chart and number 35 on the UK Singles Chart.

== Promotional singles ==
"Slow Acid" was released as the first promotional single from the album on 15 October 2014. The song reached number 86 on the UK Singles Chart. "Burnin'", a collaboration with Dutch DJ R3hab, was released as the album's second promotional single on 29 October 2014 through Beatport.

"Overdrive", a collaboration with Dutch DJ Ummet Ozcan, was released as the album's third promotional single on 22 December 2014 through Beatport. It was renamed to "Overdrive (Part 2)" because it was slightly remixed. Despite not being released as a single, "Faith" reached number 31 on the US Hot Dance/Electronic Songs chart, number 33 on the UK Dance Singles Chart and number 178 on the French Singles Chart.

== Critical reception ==
Professional ratings
Aggregate scores
Source	Rating
Metacritic	57/100
Review scores
Source	Rating
AllMusic	3/5 stars
Billboard	3/5 stars
Entertainment Weekly	B
The Guardian	3/5 stars
Los Angeles Times	2/4 stars
Newsday	B+
PopMatters	6/10
Rolling Stone	2.5/5 stars
Slant Magazine	2/5 stars
USA Today	3/4 stars

Motion received mixed reviews from music critics. At Metacritic, which assigns a normalised rating out of 100 to reviews from mainstream publications, the album received an average score of 57, based on nine reviews. Glenn Gamboa of Newsday praised the album as an "EDM winner" and was complimentary of songs such as "Outside", "Pray to God" and "Open Wide". Kyle Anderson of Entertainment Weekly wrote, "The best tracks on Motion [...] focus more on high-caliber vocals than on booty-blasting low end", adding that Harris's "largely straight-ahead approach will rankle EDM devotees who are searching for boundary-busting beats, but he's taking his chances with the most unpredictable technology of all: the human voice." Mikael Wood of the Los Angeles Times opined, "For all the intensity he delivers on Motion, Harris is best [...] when he dials down the jock-jam vibe, as in 'Love Now' [...] and 'Ecstasy'". Wood also praised the guest appearances of Gwen Stefani and Haim, stating that "the presence of those strong women does wonders for Harris' amped-up music. They bring out the man, not the meathead, in the machine." Elysa Gardner of USA Today remarked that "Harris' textural savvy is evident throughout, if his methods are hardly novel."

At Billboard, Megan Buerger commented that although the album is "packed with all-too-predictable crowd-pleasers", it "also has a few surprises [...] that suggest [Harris is] a more dynamic producer than he lets on, one with a true appreciation of dance music's purer forms." Despite noting that "there are occasional surprises" on the album, Caroline Sullivan of The Guardian concluded, "The big pop hooks and breakdowns are here, but there is little sense of Harris's personality." AllMusic's Heather Phares was unimpressed, writing, "Despite a few bright moments, Motion is disappointingly bland—especially since Harris has made plenty of memorable electro-pop before and after his EDM makeover." Similarly, Brent Faulkner of PopMatters found Motion to be "somewhat of a scattered album with some shining moments", but wrote that "Harris' production is sound and the material is pleasant if nothing more. It's not the biggest triumph of the year by any means, but Motion does whet the palate." Nick Murray of Rolling Stone expressed that "Harris is updating his EDM template rather than coming close to reimagining it", while citing "It Was You", "Dollar Signs" and "Summer" as "the kind of superglossy, unexceptionally fun tunes that kids will dance to and rebel against in equal numbers." Slant Magazine's James Rainis complimented songs like "Blame" and "Together", but criticised "Faith" and "Open Wide", commenting, "Regrettably, such ear candy [as 'Blame'] is few and far between."

Rolling Stone included Motion at number 15 on their list of the "20 Best Pop Albums of 2014".

== Commercial performance ==
Motion debuted at number two on the UK Albums Chart, selling 37,325 copies in its first week. In the United States, it entered the Billboard 200 at number five with first-week sales of 35,000 copies, marking Harris's first top-10 album on the chart, as well as his best sales week in the US. It also became his second album to top the Billboard's Dance/Electronic Albums chart, following 18 Months (2012). As of January 2015, the album had sold 66,000 copies in the US. The album debuted at number two on the Canadian Albums Chart with 7,300 copies sold in its first week.

== Track listing ==
No.	Title	Writer(s)	Producer(s)	Length
1.	"Faith"	Calvin Harris; John Newman; Steve Mac	Harris	3:39
2.	"Under Control" (with Alesso featuring Hurts)	Harris; Alessandro Lindblad; Theo Hutchcraft	Harris; Alesso	3:04
3.	"Blame" (featuring John Newman)	Harris; John Newman; James Newman	Harris	3:32
4.	"Love Now" (featuring All About She)	Harris; All About She	Harris	3:38
5.	"Slow Acid"	Harris	Harris	3:41
6.	"Outside" (featuring Ellie Goulding)	Harris; Goulding	Harris	3:47
7.	"It Was You" (with Firebeatz)	Harris; Firebeatz	Harris; Firebeatz	3:44
8.	"Summer"	Harris	Harris	3:42
9.	"Overdrive" (with Ummet Ozcan)	Harris; Ozcan	Harris; Ozcan	4:51
10.	"Ecstasy" (featuring Hurts)	Harris; Hutchcraft	Harris	3:41
11.	"Pray to God" (featuring Haim)	Harris; Haim; Ariel Rechtshaid	Harris; Rechtshaid^{[a]}	3:52
12.	"Open Wide" (featuring Big Sean)	Harris; Big Sean	Harris	3:07
13.	"Together" (featuring Gwen Stefani)	Harris; Stefani; Benjamin Levin; Ryan Tedder	Harris	3:38
14.	"Burnin'" (with R3hab)	Harris; R3hab	Harris; R3hab	3:54
15.	"Dollar Signs" (featuring Tinashe)	Harris; Tinashe	Harris	3:56

Japanese edition bonus tracks
No.	Title	Writer(s)	Producer(s)	Length
16.	"Under Control" (Sunnery James and Ryan Marciano Mix) (with Alesso featuring Hurts)	Harris; Lindblad; Hutchcraft	Harris; Alesso	6:03
17.	"Summer" (R3hab & Ummet Ozcan Remix)	Harris	Harris	4:43

=== Notes ===
- ^{^[a]} signifies an additional producer

== Personnel ==
Credits adapted from the liner notes of Motion.

=== Musicians ===
- Calvin Harris – all instruments (tracks 1, 3, 4, 6–10, 12–15); vocals (tracks 1, 8); arrangement (tracks 3, 5, 8); instruments (track 11)
- Theo Hutchcraft – vocals (tracks 2, 10)
- John Newman – vocals (track 3)
- Vanya Taylor – vocals (track 4)
- Ellie Goulding – vocals (track 6)
- Firebeatz – all instruments (track 7)
- Ummet Ozcan – all instruments (track 9)
- Haim – vocals (track 11)
- Danielle Haim – guitars (track 11)
- Ariel Rechtshaid – keyboards (track 11)
- Big Sean – vocals (track 12)
- Gwen Stefani – vocals (track 13)
- R3hab – all instruments (track 14)
- Tinashe – vocals (track 15)

=== Technical ===
- Calvin Harris – production (all tracks); mixing (tracks 1–10, 14, 15); engineering (track 2); mastering (track 14)
- Mike Marsh – mastering (tracks 1, 2, 11, 13)
- Alesso – production, mixing, engineering (track 2)
- Arthur Indrikovs – vocal engineering (tracks 3)
- Seb Berrios – additional vocal engineering (tracks 3)
- Simon Davey – mastering (tracks 3–8, 10, 15)
- Firebeatz – production (track 7)
- Ummet Ozcan – production, mixing (track 9)
- Ariel Rechtshaid – additional production (track 11)
- Manny Marroquin – mixing (tracks 11–13)
- Chris Galland – mixing assistance (tracks 11–13)
- Ike Schultz – mixing assistance (tracks 11–13)

== Charts ==
=== Weekly charts ===
Weekly chart performance for Motion
Chart (2014–2024)	Peak position
Australian Albums (ARIA)	3
Australian Dance Albums (ARIA)	1
Austrian Albums (Ö3 Austria)	13
Belgian Albums (Ultratop Flanders)	20
Belgian Albums (Ultratop Wallonia)	18
Canadian Albums (Billboard)	2
Czech Albums (ČNS IFPI)	77
Danish Albums (Hitlisten)	8
Dutch Albums (Album Top 100)	25
Finnish Albums (Suomen virallinen lista)	14
French Albums (SNEP)	20
German Albums (Offizielle Top 100)	20
Hungarian Albums (MAHASZ)	32
Irish Albums (IRMA)	5
Italian Albums (FIMI)	16
Japanese Albums (Oricon)	25
Mexican Albums (AMPROFON)	11
New Zealand Albums (RMNZ)	4
Norwegian Albums (VG-lista)	3
Polish Albums (ZPAV)	46
Portuguese Albums (AFP)	23
Scottish Albums (Official Charts)	1
Slovak Albums (ČNS IFPI)	56
South Korean Albums (Gaon)	79
Spanish Albums (Promusicae)	24
Swedish Albums (Sverigetopplistan)	4
Swiss Albums (Schweizer Hitparade)	2
UK Albums (Official Charts)	2
UK Dance Albums (Official Charts)	1
US Billboard 200	5
US Top Dance Albums (Billboard)	1

=== Year-end charts ===
2014 year-end chart performance for Motion
Chart (2014)	Position
Australian Albums (ARIA)	74
Australian Dance Albums (ARIA)	8
Swedish Albums (Sverigetopplistan)	41
Swedish Albums & Compilations (Sverigetopplistan)	44
UK Albums (OCC)	42
US Top Dance Albums (Billboard)	11

2015 year-end chart performance for Motion
Chart (2015)	Position
Australian Albums (ARIA)	95
Australian Dance Albums (ARIA)	9
Belgian Albums (Ultratop Flanders)	181
Belgian Albums (Ultratop Wallonia)	151
Danish Albums (Hitlisten)	24
Mexican Albums (AMPROFON)	50
Swedish Albums (Sverigetopplistan)	12
Swedish Albums & Compilations (Sverigetopplistan)	14
UK Albums (OCC)	44
US Billboard 200	75
US Top Dance Albums (Billboard)	3

2016 year-end chart performance for Motion
Chart (2016)	Position
Australian Dance Albums (ARIA)	35

2017 year-end chart performance for Motion
Chart (2017)	Position
US Top Dance Albums (Billboard)	21

2018 year-end chart performance for Motion
Chart (2018)	Position
Australian Dance Albums (ARIA)	48
US Top Dance Albums (Billboard)	25

2019 year-end chart performance for Motion
Chart (2019)	Position
Australian Dance Albums (ARIA)	26

2020 year-end chart performance for Motion
Chart (2020)	Position
Australian Dance Albums (ARIA)	15
US Top Dance Albums (Billboard)	24

2021 year-end chart performance for Motion
Chart (2021)	Position
US Top Dance Albums (Billboard)	17

2022 year-end chart performance for Motion
Chart (2022)	Position
US Top Dance Albums (Billboard)	13

2023 year-end chart performance for Motion
Chart (2023)	Position
US Top Dance Albums (Billboard)	14

2024 year-end chart performance for Motion
Chart (2024)	Position
Australian Dance Albums (ARIA)	6
Belgian Albums (Ultratop Flanders)	103
Belgian Albums (Ultratop Wallonia)	191
Dutch Albums (Album Top 100)	86
Hungarian Albums (MAHASZ)	74
Swedish Albums (Sverigetopplistan)	76
US Top Dance Albums (Billboard)	10

2025 year-end chart performance for Motion
Chart (2025)	Position
Belgian Albums (Ultratop Flanders)	137
Hungarian Albums (MAHASZ)	87
Swedish Albums (Sverigetopplistan)	79
US Top Dance Albums (Billboard)	13

== Certifications ==
Certifications for Motion
Region	Certification	Certified units/sales
Australia (ARIA)	Platinum	70,000^{‡}
Brazil (Pro-Música Brasil)	Diamond	160,000^{‡}
Canada (Music Canada)	2× Platinum	160,000^{‡}
Denmark (IFPI Danmark)	3× Platinum	60,000^{‡}
Germany (BVMI)	Gold	100,000^{‡}
Italy (FIMI)	Platinum	50,000^{‡}
Mexico (AMPROFON)	Diamond+Gold	330,000^{‡}
New Zealand (RMNZ)	2× Platinum	30,000^{‡}
Poland (ZPAV)	4× Platinum	80,000^{‡}
Sweden (GLF)	2× Platinum	80,000^{‡}
United Kingdom (BPI)	Platinum	300,000^{‡}
United States (RIAA)	Platinum	1,000,000^{‡}
^{‡} Sales+streaming figures based on certification alone.

== Release history ==
Release dates and formats for Motion
Region	Date	Format	Label	Ref(s)
Australia	31 October 2014	CD; digital download	Sony	
Germany	31 October 2014	CD; digital download	Sony	
Ireland	31 October 2014	CD; digital download	Fly Eye; Columbia	
Sweden	31 October 2014	CD; digital download	Sony	
France	3 November 2014	CD; digital download	Sony	
United Kingdom	3 November 2014	CD; digital download	Fly Eye; Columbia	
Italy	4 November 2014	CD; digital download	Sony	
United States	4 November 2014	CD; digital download	Columbia	
Japan	4 November 2014	Digital download	Sony	
Japan	12 November 2014	CD	Sony	
United States	14 April 2015	LP	Columbia	
France	17 April 2015	LP	Sony	
Germany	20 April 2015	LP	Sony	
United Kingdom	20 April 2015	LP	Fly Eye; Columbia	
