= Open Wide (song) =

Single by Calvin Harris featuring Big Sean

from the album Motion
- Released: 27 January 2015
- Studio: Fly Eye (London)
- Genre: Big room house; hip house
- Length: 3:07
- Label: Deconstruction; Fly Eye; Columbia
- Songwriters: Calvin Harris; Sean Anderson
- Producer: Calvin Harris

Calvin Harris singles chronology
"Outside" (2014)	"Open Wide" (2015)	"Pray to God" (2015)

Big Sean singles chronology
"Detroit vs. Everybody" (2014)	"Open Wide" (2015)	"Blessings" (2015)

Music video
- "Open Wide" on YouTube

"Open Wide" is a song by Scottish DJ and record producer Calvin Harris from his fourth studio album, Motion (2014). It features American rapper Big Sean. Originally released a promotional single on 27 October 2014, the song officially impacted rhythmic contemporary radio in the United States on 27 January 2015 as the album's fifth single. "Open Wide" is the vocal version of Harris's instrumental track "C.U.B.A", which appears as a B-side to his single "Blame". It peaked at number 23 in the UK, becoming Harris's first single to miss the top 10 since 2010.

== Music video ==
The video was directed by Emil Nava, and is a cinematic clip featuring a desert shoot-out. As two opposing sides blast shot after shot at each other, a ballerina dances in the middle of the gunfight, dodging bullets with the dexterity of Keanu Reeves in The Matrix.

In France, the music video was banned before 10pm and broadcast with a warning Not advised to kids under 12 years old (déconseillé aux moins de 12 ans) due to strong violent content, firearms showed, wounds traces and nudity scenes.

== Personnel ==
Credits adapted from the liner notes of Motion.

- Calvin Harris – vocals, all instruments, arrangement, production
- Big Sean – vocals
- Chris Galland – mixing assistance
- Manny Marroquin – mixing
- Ike Schultz – mixing assistance

== Charts ==
=== Weekly charts ===
Chart (2014–2015)	Peak position
Australia (ARIA)	77
Austria (Ö3 Austria Top 40)	58
Belgium (Ultratip Bubbling Under Flanders)	8
Belgium (Ultratip Bubbling Under Wallonia)	6
France (SNEP)	37
Germany (GfK)	22
Ireland (IRMA)	63
Lebanon (OLT 20)	12
Scottish Singles Sales (Official Charts)	5
Switzerland (Schweizer Hitparade)	41
UK Singles (Official Charts)	23
UK Dance (Official Charts)	6
US Bubbling Under Hot 100 (Billboard)	15
US Hot Dance/Electronic Songs (Billboard)	12
US Rhythmic Airplay (Billboard)	23

=== Year-end charts ===
Chart (2014)	Position
US Hot Dance/Electronic Songs (Billboard)	88

Chart (2015)	Position
US Hot Dance/Electronic Songs (Billboard)	46

== Certifications ==
Certifications for "Open Wide"
Region	Certification	Certified units/sales
Australia (ARIA)	Gold	35,000^{‡}
Canada (Music Canada)	Platinum	80,000^{‡}
United States (RIAA)	Gold	500,000^{‡}
^{‡} Sales+streaming figures based on certification alone.

== Release history ==
Region	Date	Format	Label	Ref.
United Kingdom	27 October 2014	Digital download (via pre-order of Motion)	Deconstruction; Fly Eye; Columbia	
United States	27 January 2015	Rhythmic contemporary radio	Columbia	
