= Outside (Calvin Harris song) =

2014 single by Calvin Harris featuring Ellie Goulding

Single by Calvin Harris featuring Ellie Goulding

from the album Motion
- B-side: "Ecstasy"
- Released: 20 October 2014
- Studio: Fly Eye (London)
- Genre: Electropop; EDM
- Length: 3:47
- Label: Deconstruction; Fly Eye; Columbia
- Songwriters: Calvin Harris; Ellie Goulding
- Producer: Calvin Harris

Calvin Harris singles chronology
| "Blame" (2014) | "Outside" (2014) | "Open Wide" (2015) |

Ellie Goulding singles chronology
| "Flashlight" (2014) | "Outside" (2014) | "Love Me like You Do" (2015) |

Calvin Harris and Ellie Goulding singles chronology
| "I Need Your Love" (2013) | "Outside" (2014) | "Miracle" (2023) |

Music video
- "Outside" on YouTube

"Outside" is a song by the Scottish DJ and record producer Calvin Harris featuring English singer Ellie Goulding, from Harris's fourth studio album, Motion (2014). It was released on 20 October 2014 as the album's fourth single. The song also appears on the deluxe edition of Goulding's third studio album, Delirium (2015). "Outside" marks the second collaboration between Harris and Goulding, following the single "I Need Your Love" (2013).

== Composition ==
With a tempo of 128 beats per minute, "Outside" is composed in the key of D minor. It follows a chord progression of B♭-Gm-Dm-C.

== Critical reception ==
The song received positive reviews from music critics, calling it a great follow-up of their previous collaboration, and noting it as a highlight of the album. Brent Faulkner of PopMatters praised the song as "one of Motion's crème de la crème records" and wrote that it "latches from a first listen giving the set arguably its strongest pop hit." Kyle Anderson of Entertainment Weekly commented that on "Outside", Harris "finds the perfect balance between [Goulding's] vulnerable warble and the warping synths underneath". Idolator's Robbie Daw found the song to be "just as pleasant, if not slightly more so, than Calvin and Ellie's previous outing together, 2012's 'I Need Your Love.' It's good to hear that there's still quite a bit of musical magic when these two hit the studio together."

Carolyn Menyes of Music Times stated, "There's something that works so well about Harris' string effect synth beats and Goulding's whispered ethereal voice. We've heard it before in 'I Need Your Love' and it's back here again in full force for yet another magical combination." Heather Phares of AllMusic felt that the track "doesn't quite recapture the magic of [Harris and Goulding's] previous work but does make the most of her deceptively powerful soprano, this time in a more upbeat setting." Slant Magazine's James Rainis opined that "[t]he most notable characteristic of 'Outside' [...] is that the hook's cadence is exactly the same as the Carly Rae Jepsen/Owl City song 'Good Time,' but it lacks that song's cutesy charm." Chase Hunt of AXS viewed the song as "a decent pairing but an expected outcome."

== Commercial performance ==
"Outside" entered and peaked at number six on the UK Singles Chart, selling 28,902 copies in its first week. It remained at number six the following week, selling 35,590 copies. In its third week, the song fell to number 10 with 33,208 copies sold.

In the United States, "Outside" became Harris's eighth number-one single on Billboard's Dance/Mix Show Airplay chart for the week ending 7 March 2015, surpassing both David Guetta and Madonna, who along with Harris were tied with seven. It also gives Goulding her third number-one on this chart. On the Billboard Hot 100, the song peaked at number 29, making it Harris's eighth and Goulding's fifth top-40 single.

== Music video ==
The music video for "Outside" was directed by Emil Nava and filmed in Los Angeles on 20 October 2014. The video premiered on 12 November 2014.

The video depicts two separate couples in toxic and abusive relationships. Harris and Goulding each play partners in the separate relationships who both appear to be the chief recipient of the abuse. The video is also intercut with shots of Goulding singing directly to the camera in front while her boyfriend rides a motorcycle and Harris being attacked by his girlfriend throwing glass glasses and plates at him of a suburban house, surreal images that bend the fore- and background, objects in the frame freezing in time, Goulding being suspended in the air, and Goulding with a floating rectangular mirror that eventually shatters. The video ends with Ellie Goulding and Calvin Harris together in the house in the midst of a mid-fight freeze frame, leaving the viewer to question which version was reality.

== Track listings ==
Digital download
| No. | Title | Length |
|---|---|---|
| 1. | "Outside" (featuring Ellie Goulding) | 3:47 |

CD single
| No. | Title | Length |
|---|---|---|
| 1. | "Outside" (featuring Ellie Goulding) | 3:49 |
| 2. | "Ecstasy" (featuring Hurts) | 3:42 |

Beatport remix
| No. | Title | Length |
|---|---|---|
| 1. | "Outside" (Hardwell remix) (featuring Ellie Goulding) | 4:56 |
| 2. | "Outside" (Oliver Heldens remix) (featuring Ellie Goulding) | 4:55 |

== Credits and personnel ==
Credits adapted from the liner notes of Motion.

=== Recording ===
- Recorded at Fly Eye Studio (London)
- Mastered at The Exchange Mastering Studios (London)

=== Personnel ===
- Calvin Harris – all instruments, production, mixing
- Ellie Goulding – vocals
- Simon Davey – mastering

== Charts ==
=== Weekly charts ===
2014–2015 weekly chart performance for "Outside"
| Chart (2014–2015) | Peak position |
|---|---|
| Australia (ARIA) | 7 |
| Australia Dance (ARIA) | 2 |
| Austria (Ö3 Austria Top 40) | 3 |
| Belgium (Ultratop 50 Flanders) | 8 |
| Belgium Dance (Ultratop Flanders) | 4 |
| Belgium (Ultratop 50 Wallonia) | 8 |
| Belgium Dance (Ultratop Wallonia) | 1 |
| Canada Hot 100 (Billboard) | 10 |
| Canada CHR/Top 40 (Billboard) | 37 |
| Colombia (National-Report Top Anglo) | 3 |
| Czech Republic Airplay (ČNS IFPI) | 7 |
| Czech Republic Singles Digital (ČNS IFPI) | 1 |
| Denmark (Tracklisten) | 5 |
| Euro Digital Song Sales (Billboard) | 6 |
| Finland (Suomen virallinen lista) | 1 |
| France (SNEP) | 19 |
| Germany (GfK) | 1 |
| Hungary (Rádiós Top 40) | 3 |
| Hungary (Single Top 40) | 1 |
| Hungary (Dance Top 40) | 1 |
| Ireland (IRMA) | 5 |
| Italy (FIMI) | 14 |
| Japan (Japan Hot 100) | 87 |
| Luxembourg Digital Song Sales (Billboard) | 2 |
| Mexico (Billboard Mexican Airplay) | 5 |
| Mexico Anglo (Monitor Latino) | 13 |
| Netherlands (Single Top 100) | 8 |
| Netherlands (Dance Top 30) | 3 |
| New Zealand (Recorded Music NZ) | 7 |
| Norway (VG-lista) | 3 |
| Poland Airplay (ZPAV) | 1 |
| Poland Dance (ZPAV) | 13 |
| Portugal Digital Song Sales (Billboard) | 10 |
| Scottish Singles Sales (Official Charts) | 3 |
| Slovakia Airplay (ČNS IFPI) | 15 |
| Slovakia Singles Digital (ČNS IFPI) | 3 |
| Slovenia (SloTop50) | 4 |
| South Africa Airplay (EMA) | 10 |
| South Korea International (Gaon) | 51 |
| Spain (Promusicae) | 10 |
| Sweden (Sverigetopplistan) | 3 |
| Switzerland (Schweizer Hitparade) | 5 |
| UK Singles (Official Charts) | 4 |
| UK Dance (Official Charts) | 1 |
| US Billboard Hot 100 | 29 |
| US Adult Pop Airplay (Billboard) | 34 |
| US Dance Club Songs (Billboard) | 5 |
| US Hot Dance/Electronic Songs (Billboard) | 2 |
| US Latin Pop Airplay (Billboard) | 32 |
| US Pop Airplay (Billboard) | 8 |
| US Rhythmic Airplay (Billboard) | 30 |

2026 weekly chart performance for "Outside"
| Chart (2026) | Peak position |
|---|---|
| Global 200 (Billboard) | 194 |
| Latvia Streaming (LaIPA) | 11 |

=== Year-end charts ===
2014 year-end chart performance for "Outside"
| Chart (2014) | Position |
|---|---|
| Australia (ARIA) | 80 |
| Australia Dance (ARIA) | 17 |
| Hungary (Rádiós Top 40) | 85 |
| Hungary (Single Top 40) | 60 |
| Netherlands (Dance Top 30) | 31 |
| Sweden (Sverigetopplistan) | 92 |
| UK Singles (OCC) | 84 |
| US Hot Dance/Electronic Songs (Billboard) | 57 |

2015 year-end chart performance for "Outside"
| Chart (2015) | Position |
|---|---|
| Australia Dance (ARIA) | 28 |
| Austria (Ö3 Austria Top 40) | 48 |
| Belgium (Ultratop 50 Flanders) | 57 |
| Belgium Dance (Ultratop Flanders) | 37 |
| Belgium (Ultratop 50 Wallonia) | 41 |
| Belgium Dance (Ultratop Wallonia) | 17 |
| Canada (Canadian Hot 100) | 58 |
| CIS (Tophit) | 31 |
| Denmark (Tracklisten) | 65 |
| France (SNEP) | 84 |
| Germany (Official German Charts) | 40 |
| Hungary (Rádiós Top 40) | 56 |
| Hungary (Single Top 40) | 40 |
| Hungary (Dance Top 40) | 6 |
| Italy (FIMI) | 62 |
| Netherlands (Dutch Top 40) | 40 |
| Netherlands (Single Top 100) | 54 |
| Netherlands (Dance Top 30) | 13 |
| Poland (Polish Airplay Top 100) | 37 |
| Russia Airplay (Tophit) | 32 |
| Slovenia (SloTop50) | 27 |
| Spain (PROMUSICAE) | 35 |
| Sweden (Sverigetopplistan) | 77 |
| Switzerland (Schweizer Hitparade) | 40 |
| Ukraine Airplay (Tophit) | 63 |
| UK Singles (OCC) | 85 |
| US Hot Dance/Electronic Songs (Billboard) | 6 |
| US Mainstream Top 40 (Billboard) | 48 |

2025 year-end chart performance for "Outside"
| Chart (2025) | Position |
|---|---|
| Hungary (Rádiós Top 40) | 96 |

== Certifications ==
Certifications and sales for "Outside"
| Region | Certification | Certified units/sales |
|---|---|---|
| Australia (ARIA) | 5× Platinum | 350,000^{‡} |
| Brazil (Pro-Música Brasil) | Diamond | 250,000^{‡} |
| Canada (Music Canada) | 4× Platinum | 320,000^{‡} |
| Denmark (IFPI Danmark) | 2× Platinum | 180,000^{‡} |
| Germany (BVMI) | 3× Gold | 600,000^{‡} |
| Italy (FIMI) | 2× Platinum | 100,000^{‡} |
| Mexico (AMPROFON) | 2× Diamond+Platinum | 660,000^{‡} |
| New Zealand (RMNZ) | 4× Platinum | 120,000^{‡} |
| Norway (IFPI Norway) | 3× Platinum | 30,000^{‡} |
| Portugal (AFP) | Gold | 10,000^{‡} |
| Spain (Promusicae) | 2× Platinum | 120,000^{‡} |
| United Kingdom (BPI) | 3× Platinum | 1,800,000^{‡} |
| United States (RIAA) | 3× Platinum | 3,000,000^{‡} |
^{‡} Sales+streaming figures based on certification alone.

== Release history ==
Release dates and formats for "Outside"
| Region | Date | Format | Label | Ref. |
|---|---|---|---|---|
| United States | 20 October 2014 | Digital download (Note: Via pre-order of Motion) | Deconstruction; Fly Eye; Columbia | |
| Germany | 19 December 2014 | CD single | Sony | |
| United States | 13 January 2015 | Contemporary hit radio | Columbia | |
| Italy | 16 January 2015 | Radio airplay | Sony | |
