= Slow Acid =

Promotional single by Calvin Harris

from the album Motion
- Released: 14 October 2014
- Recorded: 2014
- Genre: Acid house
- Length: 3:41
- Label: Deconstruction; Fly Eye; Columbia
- Songwriter: Adam Wiles
- Producer: Calvin Harris

Music video
- "Slow Acid" on YouTube

"Slow Acid" is a song by Scottish DJ and producer Calvin Harris for his fourth studio album, Motion (2014). It was released on 14 October 2014 as the album's first promotional single.

== Music video ==
The official music video for the song, directed by Emil Nava, was uploaded onto Calvin Harris' Vevo channel on 15 October 2014. It has since been viewed over 9,000,000 times. It features a woman in blue going around in a city at night under the influence of drugs and alcohol, the blue colour indicating that she is under severe drug and alcohol use and has a hangover. She wakes up the next day lying on a road looking normal, apparently recovered from the hangover she experienced the previous night.

== Track listing ==
Digital download – single
No.	Title	Length
1.	"Slow Acid"	3:41

== Credits and personnel ==
- Calvin Harris – production, arrangement

== Charts ==
Chart (2014)	Peak position
Scotland Singles (OCC)	34
UK Singles (OCC)	86
UK Dance (OCC)	18
US Hot Dance/Electronic Songs (Billboard)	19

== Release history ==
Region	Date	Label	Format(s)
Worldwide	14 October 2014	Fly Eye	Digital download
