= My Way (Calvin Harris song) =

2016 single by Calvin Harris

Single by Calvin Harris

from the album 96 Months
- Released: 16 September 2016
- Genre: Tropical house
- Length: 3:39
- Label: Sony; Columbia
- Songwriter: Calvin Harris
- Producer: Calvin Harris

Calvin Harris singles chronology
"Hype" (2016)	"My Way" (2016)	"Slide" (2017)

Music video
- "My Way" on YouTube

"My Way" is a song by Scottish DJ and producer Calvin Harris. The song was released on 16 September 2016, through Sony Music and Columbia Records and included on his first compilation album, 96 Months (2024). Harris announced the single on his Twitter page five days prior to its release. Like his previous 2010s singles "Summer" and "Feel So Close", Harris returns as a vocalist.

It peaked at number four on the UK Singles Chart. Outside the United Kingdom, the single topped the charts in the Czech Republic and Hungary and peaked within the top ten of the charts in Australia, Austria, Belgium, France, Germany, Israel, Lebanon, the Netherlands, New Zealand, Norway, Paraguay, Poland, the Republic of Ireland, Slovakia, Sweden and Switzerland and the top twenty of the charts in Canada, Denmark, Finland, Italy, Portugal and Spain.

== Background and composition ==
"[The] song's kind of about breaking out of a situation that you thought was a good thing. Then, you're way more comfortable out of it. And it could be anything. It could be a job, or it could be a relationship. I had kind of the idea for the concept for a few years, but I didn't know how to work out how it sounded."

— Harris, during an interview with iHeartRadio.

On 6 September 2016, Harris uploaded the artwork for "My Way" without the song title to his Twitter and Instagram accounts, causing people to believe that this was hinting at a new song being in the works. Harris announced the single along with its official artwork to his Twitter page on 12 September 2016, four days prior to its release.

"My Way" is an uptempo, tropical house song. The song is written in the key of E minor with a common time tempo of 120 beats per minute. Harris's vocals span from D_{3} to G_{4} in the song.

Harris stated on the British radio station Heart and other interviews, that the lyrics are about his career in the grocery store he used to work in and how it prevented him from moving to London to progress in his music production.

== Music video ==
The music video for the song was released to YouTube on 28 October 2016 through Calvin Harris' official Vevo account. It was directed by long-time collaborator, Emil Nava.

It was signed in the desert of the United States in a red building. Harris is seen in a virtual reality headset and in a cabin in the countryside. In addition, you can see a woman walking in nature with a black dress and a girl riding a horse and a red sports car. The video begins to glitch, and the Italian model Emanuela Postacchini is shown. She and Harris sitting at the table looking at her, and on the farm some models appear dancing to the song, and Postacchini in a robotic dress. The video ends with Harris and Postacchini looking at each other, then the background of the cover appears, and an old computer turns off. Edited by Ellie Johnson, and post creative and glitch effects by Chris Hoffman.

== Chart performance ==
In the United States, "My Way" debuted at number 24 on the Billboard Hot 100 on the issue dated 8 October 2016. The single opened at number 4 on Digital Songs with 53,000 downloads, and at number 45 on Streaming Songs with 6 million US streams in its first full week. On Radio Songs, it opened 46 following its first full week of airplay (27 million in audience).

== Track listing ==
Digital download
No.	Title	Length
1.	"My Way"	3:39

== Charts ==
=== Weekly charts ===
Weekly chart performance for "My Way"
Chart (2016–2017)	Peak position
Argentina Airplay (Monitor Latino)	2
Australia (ARIA)	9
Austria (Ö3 Austria Top 40)	4
Belgium (Ultratop 50 Flanders)	5
Belgium (Ultratop 50 Wallonia)	6
Canada Hot 100 (Billboard)	14
Colombia Airplay (National-Report)	55
Czech Republic Airplay (ČNS IFPI)	1
Czech Republic Singles Digital (ČNS IFPI)	2
Denmark (Tracklisten)	20
Finland (Suomen virallinen lista)	15
France (SNEP)	4
Germany (GfK)	5
Hungary (Dance Top 40)	1
Hungary (Rádiós Top 40)	1
Hungary (Single Top 40)	2
Ireland (IRMA)	4
Israel International Airplay (Media Forest)	6
Italy (FIMI)	11
Japan Hot 100 (Billboard)	83
Lebanon (Lebanese Top 20)	10
Mexico Airplay (Billboard)	1
Netherlands (Dutch Top 40)	4
Netherlands (Single Top 100)	6
New Zealand (Recorded Music NZ)	10
Norway (VG-lista)	9
Paraguay Airplay (Monitor Latino)	9
Poland Airplay (ZPAV)	2
Poland Dance (ZPAV)	2
Portugal (AFP)	11
Russia Airplay (Tophit)	1
Scottish Singles Sales (Official Charts)	1
Slovakia Airplay (ČNS IFPI)	33
Slovakia Singles Digital (ČNS IFPI)	2
Slovenia Airplay (SloTop50)	4
Spain (Promusicae)	12
Sweden (Sverigetopplistan)	7
Switzerland (Schweizer Hitparade)	2
UK Singles (Official Charts)	4
UK Dance (Official Charts)	4
US Billboard Hot 100	24
US Dance Club Songs (Billboard)	6
US Hot Dance/Electronic Songs (Billboard)	6
US Pop Airplay (Billboard)	12
US Rhythmic Airplay (Billboard)	30

=== Year-end charts ===
2016 year-end chart performance for "My Way"
Chart (2016)	Position
Argentina Airplay (Monitor Latino)	33
Australia (ARIA)	74
Austria (Ö3 Austria Top 40)	56
Belgium (Ultratop Flanders)	59
Belgium (Ultratop Wallonia)	70
CIS (Tophit)	67
France (SNEP)	111
Germany (Official German Charts)	58
Hungary (Dance Top 40)	39
Italy (FIMI)	86
Netherlands (Dutch Top 40)	32
Netherlands (Single Top 100)	74
Russia Airplay (Tophit)	65
Switzerland (Schweizer Hitparade)	67
Ukraine Airplay (Tophit)	98
UK Singles (OCC)	65
US Hot Dance/Electronic Songs (Billboard)	19

2017 year-end chart performance for "My Way"
Chart (2017)	Position
Argentina Airplay (Monitor Latino)	27
Belgium (Ultratop Wallonia)	98
CIS (Tophit)	24
France (SNEP)	111
Hungary (Dance Top 40)	6
Hungary (Rádiós Top 40)	30
Hungary (Single Top 40)	59
Hungary (Stream Top 40)	80
Latvia Airplay (LaIPA)	48
Netherlands (Dutch Top 40)	100
Poland (Polish Airplay Top 100)	89
Russia Airplay (Tophit)	34
Slovenia (SloTop50)	46
Switzerland (Schweizer Hitparade)	68
Ukraine Airplay (Tophit)	15
US Hot Dance/Electronic Songs (Billboard)	32

2024 year-end chart performance for "My Way"
Chart (2024)	Position
Lithuania Airplay (TopHit)	103

2025 year-end chart performance for "My Way"
Chart (2025)	Position
Lithuania Airplay (TopHit)	145

== Certifications ==
Certifications and sales for "My Way"
Region	Certification	Certified units/sales
Australia (ARIA)	5× Platinum	350,000^{‡}
Austria (IFPI Austria)	Platinum	30,000^{‡}
Belgium (BRMA)	Platinum	20,000^{‡}
Brazil (Pro-Música Brasil)	Diamond	250,000^{‡}
Canada (Music Canada)	Platinum	80,000^{‡}
Denmark (IFPI Danmark)	Platinum	90,000^{‡}
France (SNEP)	Diamond	233,333^{‡}
Germany (BVMI)	3× Gold	600,000^{‡}
Italy (FIMI)	3× Platinum	150,000^{‡}
Mexico (AMPROFON)	Diamond+3× Platinum+Gold	510,000^{‡}
New Zealand (RMNZ)	4× Platinum	120,000^{‡}
Poland (ZPAV)	3× Platinum	60,000^{‡}
Portugal (AFP)	Platinum	10,000^{‡}
Spain (Promusicae)	2× Platinum	120,000^{‡}
Sweden (GLF)	Platinum	40,000^{‡}
Switzerland (IFPI Switzerland)	Platinum	30,000^{‡}
United Kingdom (BPI)	2× Platinum	1,200,000^{‡}
United States (RIAA)	2× Platinum	2,000,000^{‡}
^{‡} Sales+streaming figures based on certification alone.

== Release history ==
Release dates for "My Way"
Country	Date	Format	Label	Ref.
Various	19 September 2016	Digital download	Sony	
United States	20 September 2016	Contemporary hit radio	Columbia	
