= Timebomb (Tove Lo song) =

Single by Tove Lo

from the album Queen of the Clouds
- Released: 12 August 2015
- Recorded: 2014 Apmamman (Stockholm)
- Genre: Electropop; EDM
- Length: 3:34
- Label: Universal
- Songwriters: Tove Lo; Klas Åhlund; Alexander Kronlund
- Producer: Klas Åhlund

Tove Lo singles chronology
"Come Back to Me" (2015)	"Timebomb" (2015)	"Moments" (2015)

Music video
- "Timebomb" on YouTube

"Timebomb" is a song by Swedish singer and songwriter Tove Lo from her debut studio album, Queen of the Clouds (2014). It was written by Lo, Alexander Kronlund and Klas Åhlund, and produced by Åhlund. Initially a promotional single, the track was later released as the third single from the album on 12 August 2015. It is an electropop and EDM track with piano instrumentation; the lyrics talk about a passionate and fleeting romance that is not meant to last.

"Timebomb" received positive reviews from music critics, with many of them deeming it as one of the best tracks from Queen of the Clouds. However, the track was not commercially successful, only peaking at number four on the Swedish Heatseeker Top 20 chart. A music video for the track was released on 22 June 2015. It depicts Lo performing the track on a beach alongside couples of varied races, ages, and sexual orientations who are fighting and reconciling with each other. The visual received positive reviews and was praised for its LGBTQ themes. The singer performed the track on her Queen of the Clouds Tour in 2015, as well in festivals such as Boston Calling Music Festival and Way Out West.

== Background and release ==
"Timebomb" was written by Tove Lo, Alexander Kronlund and Klas Åhlund. It was recorded at Apmamman Studio in Stockholm, Sweden, where Åhlund also handled the production and programming of it, and played all the instruments. Michael Ilbert mixed the track at Hansa Tonstudio in Berlin, Germany, while Björn Engelmann helped master it at Cutting Room, Stockholm, and David Nyström contributed to the piano.

The song is included on "The Sex" section of the singer's debut studio album, Queen of the Clouds. "Timebomb" was initially released on 9 September 2014 as the first promotional single from the record while pre-ordering the album on iTunes. Following the release of its music video in June 2015, Republic Records announced that the track would be the third single from the album, scheduling its release on the US contemporary hit radio stations the next month. However, this was later cancelled by the label, who opted to promote "Moments" instead. Nonetheless, a remixed single of "Timebomb" was digitally released in Europe on 12 August 2015, while on 16 September in North America.

== Composition ==
"Timebomb"
A sample of "Timebomb", an electropop and EDM track with piano instrumentation, "wordy" verses and an "anthemic" and "shouty" chorus.

"Timebomb" has been described as an electropop and EDM track with piano instrumentation. It has "wordy" verses and an "anthemic", "shouty" chorus that repeats: "We're not forever, you're not the one / You and I, we're a ti-i-ime bomb! bomb! bomb!". Idolator's Bradley Stern and Sam Lansky from Time compared the song to Robyn's "Be Mine!" (2005), which was also co-written by Ahlund.

With the lyrics, Lo talks about a passionate and fleeting romance that is not meant to last, as stated in the lines "We're not happy ever after, we don't got what it takes / And we don't make plans, cause we're never gonna last". Lo explained that, for her, the early stages of a relationship are the best since they are the most intense and romantic, adding that, "When you're with someone, usually what you think back to when you've been together a long time. You remember the first time you met someone or the first time you saw them... an instant attraction. [...] The passion is going to be the best part, the start of it and that first moment." The staff of Spanish website Jenesaispop compared the lyrical content with the saying "Good things, when short, are twice as good".

== Reception ==
"Timebomb" received mostly positive reviews from music critics. Bradley Stern of Idolator described it as a "massive smash" with a "truly massive production" and added that "This song truly is the best thing ever." Similarly, Scandipop wrote that "Timebomb" was the best thing that Tove Lo has "ever done" and praised its composition. Both Ilana Kaplan from Refinery29 and the staff of Capital FM described it as an "anthemic" recording, while Sam Lansky from Time called the song a "madcap stampede" while pointing out "talky lyrics and a chorus that explodes like a confetti cannon". Heather Phares of AllMusic compared it to the music of American singer Pink and deemed the song as one of the record's best tracks. In his review of Queen of the Clouds, Jenesaispop's Raúl Guillén called "Timebomb" "wonderful and epic" and "one of the key elements from the album". However, the staff from the website later described the song as "addictive and annoying" and stated that "you either love it or hate it" on further publications.

James Rettig of Stereogum called "Timebomb" one of the best songs from the record, while Kitty Empire of The Guardian said that the song was the "magnificent crowning moment" of Queen of the Clouds. Richard S. Chang from Redbull.com ranked it at number five on his list of the best songs by Lo. Will Hermes of Rolling Stone wrote: "The beat-trampling word rush of 'Timebomb' sounds like The Hold Steady reimagined by The Kick Inside-era Kate Bush". Loren Diblasi of MTV News said that the track detailed "the multi-layered complexities of love". In a more negative review, Maxie Molotov-Smith from Fortitude Magazine criticized the song's composition, saying that the "melodic structure falls into a rather clumsy area as a seemingly endless army of syllables battle their way into the track for a space".

"Timebomb" had a minor commercial reception. It entered the Swedish Heatseeker Top 20 chart at the eighth position on 2 July 2015. The song spent eight weeks on the chart, peaking at number four.

== Music video ==
=== Background and release ===
According to Lo, she initially received many treatments for the music video from other people, with most of them being about a one-night stand storyline. Wanting the video to have a deeper meaning, she wrote herself the plot, inspired about the "kind of love that can't last forever because it isn't allowed to or it's not socially accepted"; to achieve this, she hired couples of different races, ages, and sexual orientations, who she claimed, "have to fight to stay together" and "should be accepted the way they are and should be able to love whoever they want to love". In March 2015, photos of the singer naked with her nipples censored while filming the clip on a beach located in California were published by several websites. In an interview with Noise11, Lo expressed her disapproval towards the censorship, saying that she could show her nipples if she wanted to and wondered why women's bodies were always sexualized.

On 17 June 2015, the official lyric video was uploaded to the singer's Vevo account. It shows a naked couple hugging and touching each other's bodies, while the lyrics are displayed on their skin. The visual was directed by Swedish company Bror Bror, who previously directed the lyrical visual for "Talking Body" and the clip for "Over". Two days later, the singer shared a 28-second preview of the official music video, and announced its release date. The video finally premiered on 22 June and was directed by Emil Nava. With the release of the music video, Lo launched the website weareatimebomb.com, where people could stream the clip with other fans and the singer herself via webcam. It was compared by critics to the online chat site Chatroulette.

=== Synopsis and reception ===
The music video for "Timebomb" features couples of different races, age, and sexual orientation that, in the singer's opinion, "should be accepted the way they are".

The widescreen music video takes place on a beach, where Lo is sitting on a wood platform wearing a black swimsuit. The next scenes show different couples dressed in white clothes: one lesbian, one gay and three heterosexual, of which one is biracial and one of elders. As Lo is singing, the couples fight, kiss and make up. In the second verse, the singer appears with a black dress and incorporates the same interactions of the couples with a man. During the bridge, she appears naked on the sand while performing the track. The clip finishes with the couples hugging and kissing each other.

Loren Diblasi of MTV News called it an "explosive" clip that was a "fitting tribute to complicated love". Complex's Jessie Morris wrote that the music video "leans into the singer's habits for passion and pain as it scopes across the explosive relationships between couples against the background of a desolate beach". Carl Williot of Idolator described it from an emotional standpoint as "simple and effective", while Jonathan Hamard and Yohann Ruelle from French website Pure Charts stated that the video had "a beautiful message for a romantic accomplishment". Writing for The Line of Best Fit, Laurence Day said that the visual was "emotionally explosive", while the staff of Capital FM felt it was a "raw, emotion-filled video". Some critics also praised the clip for its support towards the LGBTQ community. Trish Bendix of AfterEllen.com included it on her list called "2015: The Year in Lesbian/Bi Music" as part of the positive and supportive songs, and videos from allies. Preston Max Allen of Pride.com ranked the clip at number five on the 20 Music Videos with Lesbian Imagery, from Sweetest to Most Exploitative, writing that, "We didn't expect to be so blown away by this video when it was released, yet here we are watching it over and over again." Spanish website Jenesaispop announced that the song was featured, due to its clip's themes, on the parade Orgullo Gay in Madrid, which took place on 4 July 2015.

== Live performances ==
On 1 October 2014, Lo performed "Timebomb" and other songs at Webster Hall in Manhattan, New York City, as part of the You Oughta Know Presents: Tove Lo US Tour sponsored by VH1. On 23 May, she sang it at the 2015 Boston Calling Music Festival. "Timebomb" was included on the set list of the singer's Queen of the Clouds Tour (2015). Jordi Bardají of Jenesaispop, who reviewed her show in Barcelona, Spain, said that the track was the most effective song performed live from the repertoire. On 14 August 2015, Lo performed the song at the Way Out West festival in Gothenburg, Sweden. On 11 September 2015, she held a concert at the Deutsches Theater in Berlin, Germany, and performed "Timebomb" among tracks from Truth Serum and Queen of the Clouds.

== Track listings ==
- Digital download (promotional single)
1. "Timebomb" – 3:34
- Digital remixes single
1. "Timebomb" (Lucas Nord Remix) – 3:30
2. "Timebomb" (Sonny Alven Remix) – 4:07
3. "Timebomb" (Kateboy Remix) – 3:42

== Charts ==
Chart (2015)	Peak position
Sweden (Heatseeker Top 20 chart)	4

== Release history ==
Region	Date	Format	Label	Ref.
Various	9 September 2014	Digital download (promotional single)	Universal	
Ireland	12 August 2015	Digital download (remixes)	Universal	
Spain	12 August 2015	Digital download (remixes)	Universal	
Sweden	12 August 2015	Digital download (remixes)	Universal	
United Kingdom	12 August 2015	Digital download (remixes)	Universal	
Canada	16 September 2015	Digital download (remixes)	Universal	
United States	16 September 2015	Digital download (remixes)	Island	
