= Faking It (song) =

Single by Calvin Harris featuring Kehlani and Lil Yachty

from the album Funk Wav Bounces Vol. 1
- Released: 17 October 2017
- Genre: R&B; pop
- Length: 4:00 (album version); 3:47 (radio edit)
- Label: Columbia; Sony
- Songwriters: Adam Wiles; Jessie Reyez; Miles McCollum
- Producer: Calvin Harris

Calvin Harris singles chronology
"Feels" (2017)	"Faking It" (2017)	"The Weekend (Funk Wav Remix)" (2017)

Kehlani singles chronology
"Touch" (2017)	"Faking It" (2017)	"Done for Me" (2018)

Lil Yachty singles chronology
"Marmalade" (2017)	"Faking It" (2017)	"Ice Tray" (2017)

Music video
- "Faking It" on YouTube

"Faking It" is a song by Scottish DJ and record producer Calvin Harris featuring American singer Kehlani and American rapper Lil Yachty. It was released as the fifth and final single from Harris's fifth studio album, Funk Wav Bounces Vol. 1 (2017). It was written by Harris, Lil Yachty, and Jessie Reyez, being produced by Harris himself, and was released to contemporary hit radio in the US on 17 October 2017 through Columbia Records. It was sent to radio in Italy on 24 November 2017 through Sony.

== Composition ==
Musically, "Faking It" is a downtempo R&B and pop song that contains elements of Miami bass and 1980s pop music.

== Music video ==
The official music video was released on 23 October 2017. It was directed by Emil Nava. It features Yachty wearing clout goggles and sitting on an icy car. It also features Kehlani sitting on a throne next to a dog; Harris makes a cameo near the end.

== Track listings ==
Digital download
No.	Title	Length
1.	"Faking It" (featuring Kehlani and Lil Yachty)	4:00

Digital download
No.	Title	Length
1.	"Faking It" (Radio Edit) (featuring Kehlani and Lil Yachty)	3:47

== Charts ==
=== Weekly charts ===
Weekly chart performance for "Faking It"
Chart (2017–2018)	Peak position
Belgium (Ultratip Bubbling Under Flanders)	23
Belgium (Ultratip Bubbling Under Wallonia)	8
Canada (Canadian Hot 100)	99
Czech Republic (Rádio – Top 100)	66
New Zealand Heatseekers (RMNZ)	10
Poland (Polish Airplay Top 100)	36
Scotland Singles (OCC)	75
UK Singles (OCC)	97
US Billboard Hot 100	94
US Hot Dance/Electronic Songs (Billboard)	6
US Hot R&B/Hip-Hop Songs (Billboard)	38
US Pop Airplay (Billboard)	25
US Rhythmic Airplay (Billboard)	11

=== Year-end charts ===
2017 year-end chart performance for "Faking It"
Chart (2017)	Position
US Hot Dance/Electronic Songs (Billboard)	50

2018 year-end chart performance for "Faking It"
Chart (2018)	Position
US Hot Dance/Electronic Songs (Billboard)	25

== Certifications ==
Certifications for "Faking It"
Region	Certification	Certified units/sales
Australia (ARIA)	Gold	35,000^{‡}
Canada (Music Canada)	Gold	40,000^{‡}
New Zealand (RMNZ)	Platinum	30,000^{‡}
United Kingdom (BPI)	Silver	200,000^{‡}
United States (RIAA)	Platinum	1,000,000^{‡}
^{‡} Sales+streaming figures based on certification alone.

== Release history ==
Release dates and formats for "Faking It"
Region	Date	Format	Version	Label	Ref.
United States	17 October 2017	Contemporary hit radio	Original	Columbia	
United States	17 October 2017	Rhythmic contemporary radio	Original	Columbia	
Various	17 October 2017	Digital download	Radio Edit	Sony	
Italy	24 November 2017	Radio airplay	Radio Edit	Sony	
