= Summer (Calvin Harris song) =

2014 single by Calvin Harris

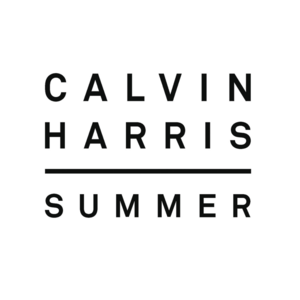

Single by Calvin Harris

from the album Motion
- Released: 14 March 2014
- Recorded: 2013
- Studio: Fly Eye Studio (London, England)
- Length: 3:44
- Label: Deconstruction; Fly Eye; Columbia
- Songwriter: Calvin Harris
- Producer: Calvin Harris

Calvin Harris singles chronology
"Under Control" (2013)	"Summer" (2014)	"Blame" (2014)

Music video
- "Summer" on YouTube

"Summer" is a song by Scottish DJ Calvin Harris, released on 14 March 2014 as the second single from his fourth studio album, Motion (2014). Like his earlier single "Feel So Close" and his later single "My Way", Harris returns as a vocalist on "Summer". The accompanying music video was directed by Emil Nava and premiered on 6 April 2014.

The song debuted at number one on the UK Singles Chart, becoming Harris's sixth UK number-one single. It peaked at number seven on the Billboard Hot 100, becoming his second top ten hit as a lead artist and third overall, and had sold over a million copies in the United States within 4 months of its release. "Summer" received nominations for British Single and British Artist Video of the Year at the 2015 Brit Awards.

== Background ==
On 11 March 2014, Harris posted fifteen-second clips of the song on Instagram up until 14 March, when it was released digitally in certain territories and made its radio debut on Capital FM.

"Summer" is composed in the key of G major and has a tempo of 128 beats per minute. It follows the chord progression C–Em–D–Am–G/B–C. Harris' vocal range spans from G_{2} to G_{4}.

== Critical reception ==
The song received mixed reviews. Lewis Corner of Digital Spy rated "Summer" three-and-a-half out of five stars, calling it "a bright and vibrant banger destined to soundtrack the warmer months". Jamieson Cox of Time magazine felt that the song "doesn't have much lyrical meat on its bones, but coming on the heels of one of the most severe winters in recent memory, listeners are likely hungry for anything that suggests a warmer, sunnier season. One of Harris' trademark gigantic synth hooks doesn't hurt its digestibility, either." Robbie Daw of Idolator viewed the track as "a shameless bid at nabbing an 'Umbrella'/'California Gurls'/'Blurred Lines'-like Song Of The Summer anthem".

In September 2014, "Summer" was named the song of the summer by Spotify; it was the most listened-to track since June 2014 with more than 160 million plays. Time listed "Summer" as the fourth worst song of 2014.

== Music video ==
The music video for "Summer" was directed by Emil Nava and premiered on 6 April 2014, with a cameo appearance by English actor Jason Statham.

== Track listings ==
Digital single
No.	Title	Length
1.	"Summer"	3:44

German CD single
No.	Title	Length
1.	"Summer"	3:44
2.	"Summer" (Extended Mix)	4:56

Digital download – remixes EP
No.	Title	Length
1.	"Summer" (Extended Mix)	4:56
2.	"Summer" (Diplo & Grandtheft Remix)	4:27
3.	"Summer" (R3hab & Ummet Ozcan Remix)	4:40
4.	"Summer" (Twoloud Remix)	5:22

== Charts ==
=== Weekly charts ===
2014 weekly chart performance for "Summer"
Chart (2014)	Peak position
Australia (ARIA)	4
Australia Dance (ARIA)	1
Austria (Ö3 Austria Top 40)	2
Belgium (Ultratop 50 Flanders)	5
Belgium Dance (Ultratop Flanders)	4
Belgium (Ultratop 50 Wallonia)	3
Belgium Dance (Ultratop Wallonia)	3
Canada Hot 100 (Billboard)	3
Canada AC (Billboard)	19
Canada CHR/Top 40 (Billboard)	1
Canada Hot AC (Billboard)	3
CIS Airplay (TopHit)	2
Czech Republic Airplay (ČNS IFPI)	12
Czech Republic Singles Digital (ČNS IFPI)	1
Denmark (Tracklisten)	20
Euro Digital Song Sales (Billboard)	2
Finland (Suomen virallinen lista)	1
France (SNEP)	15
France Airplay (SNEP)	3
Germany (GfK)	3
Hungary (Dance Top 40)	1
Hungary (Rádiós Top 40)	12
Hungary (Single Top 40)	2
Ireland (IRMA)	1
Italy (FIMI)	3
Japan Hot 100 (Billboard)	42
Mexico (Billboard Mexican Airplay)	2
Mexico Anglo (Monitor Latino)	1
Netherlands (Dutch Top 40)	1
Netherlands (Single Top 100)	3
Netherlands (Mega Dance Top 30)	1
New Zealand (Recorded Music NZ)	19
Norway (VG-lista)	2
Poland Airplay (ZPAV)	5
Poland Dance (ZPAV)	2
Russia Airplay (TopHit)	2
Scottish Singles Sales (Official Charts)	1
Slovakia Airplay (ČNS IFPI)	3
Slovakia Singles Digital (ČNS IFPI)	1
Slovenia (SloTop50)	1
South Africa Airplay (EMA)	5
Spain (Promusicae)	7
Sweden (Sverigetopplistan)	4
Switzerland (Schweizer Hitparade)	3
Ukraine Airplay (TopHit)	43
UK Singles (Official Charts)	1
UK Dance (Official Charts)	1
US Billboard Hot 100	7
US Adult Contemporary (Billboard)	23
US Adult Pop Airplay (Billboard)	11
US Dance Club Songs (Billboard)	5
US Hot Dance/Electronic Songs (Billboard)	1
US Latin Pop Airplay (Billboard)	15
US Pop Airplay (Billboard)	3
US Rhythmic Airplay (Billboard)	10
Venezuela Rock General (Record Report)	5

2024 weekly chart performance for "Summer"
Chart (2024)	Peak position
Global Excl. U.S (Billboard)	198

2026 weekly chart performance for "Summer"
Chart (2026)	Peak position
Germany Dance (GfK)	12
Latvia Streaming (LaIPA)	13

=== Year-end charts ===
2014 year-end chart performance for "Summer"
Chart (2014)	Position
Australia (ARIA)	45
Australia Dance (ARIA)	9
Austria (Ö3 Austria Top 40)	11
Belgium (Ultratop 50 Flanders)	15
Belgium Dance (Ultratop Flanders)	9
Belgium (Ultratop 50 Wallonia)	16
Belgium Dance (Ultratop Wallonia)	2
Brazil (Crowley)	77
Canada (Canadian Hot 100)	15
Denmark (Tracklisten)	20
France (SNEP)	48
Germany (Official German Charts)	17
Hungary (Dance Top 40)	2
Hungary (Rádiós Top 40)	64
Hungary (Single Top 40)	6
Italy (FIMI)	9
Japan Adult Contemporary (Billboard)	22
Netherlands (Dutch Top 40)	3
Netherlands (Single Top 100)	8
Netherlands (Mega Dance Top 30)	3
Poland (Polish Airplay Top 100)	39
Russia Airplay (TopHit)	15
Slovenia (SloTop50)	9
Spain (PROMUSICAE)	27
Sweden (Sverigetopplistan)	9
Switzerland (Schweizer Hitparade)	13
Ukraine Airplay (TopHit)	78
UK Singles (OCC)	22
US Billboard Hot 100	33
US Dance Club Songs (Billboard)	45
US Hot Dance/Electronic Songs (Billboard)	3
US Mainstream Top 40 (Billboard)	25
US Rhythmic (Billboard)	41

2015 year-end chart performance for "Summer"
Chart (2015)	Position
Hungary (Dance Top 40)	47
US Hot Dance/Electronic Songs (Billboard)	35

=== Decade-end charts ===
2010s-end chart performance for "Summer"
Chart (2010–2019)	Position
US Hot Dance/Electronic Songs (Billboard)	30

== Certifications ==
Certifications and sales for "Summer"
Region	Certification	Certified units/sales
Australia (ARIA)	7× Platinum	490,000^{‡}
Austria (IFPI Austria)	Gold	15,000^{*}
Belgium (BRMA)	Gold	15,000^{*}
Brazil (Pro-Música Brasil)	3× Diamond	750,000^{‡}
Canada (Music Canada)	8× Platinum	640,000^{‡}
Germany (BVMI)	3× Gold	900,000^{‡}
Italy (FIMI)	4× Platinum	200,000^{‡}
Mexico (AMPROFON)	2× Diamond+3× Platinum+Gold	810,000^{‡}
New Zealand (RMNZ)	5× Platinum	150,000^{‡}
Norway (IFPI Norway)	5× Platinum	50,000^{‡}
Portugal (AFP)	Platinum	20,000^{‡}
Spain (Promusicae)	3× Platinum	180,000^{‡}
Sweden (GLF)	3× Platinum	120,000^{‡}
Switzerland (IFPI Switzerland)	Platinum	30,000^{^}
United Kingdom (BPI)	4× Platinum	2,400,000^{‡}
United States (RIAA)	6× Platinum	6,000,000^{‡}
Streaming
Denmark (IFPI Danmark)	2× Platinum	5,200,000^{†}
Spain (Promusicae)	Platinum	8,000,000^{†}
^{*} Sales figures based on certification alone.^{^} Shipments figures based on certification alone.^{‡} Sales+streaming figures based on certification alone.^{†} Streaming-only figures based on certification alone.

== Release history ==
Release dates for "Summer"
Region	Date	Format	Label	Ref.
Australia	14 March 2014	Digital download	Sony	
New Zealand	14 March 2014	Digital download	Sony	
United States	18 March 2014	Digital download	Columbia	
United Kingdom	24 March 2014	Contemporary hit radio	Deconstruction; Fly Eye; Columbia	
United States	25 March 2014	Contemporary hit radio	Columbia	
Germany	25 April 2014	Digital download	Sony	
Ireland	25 April 2014	Digital download	Deconstruction; Fly Eye; Columbia	
United Kingdom	27 April 2014	Digital download	Deconstruction; Fly Eye; Columbia	
Germany	9 May 2014	CD single	Sony	
Australia	20 June 2014	Digital EP – remixes	Sony	
France	20 June 2014	Digital EP – remixes	Sony	
Germany	20 June 2014	Digital EP – remixes	Sony	
Ireland	20 June 2014	Digital EP – remixes	Deconstruction; Fly Eye; Columbia	
United Kingdom	20 June 2014	Digital EP – remixes	Deconstruction; Fly Eye; Columbia	
United States	20 June 2014	Digital EP – remixes	Columbia	
