= Heatstroke (song) =

Single by Calvin Harris featuring Young Thug, Pharrell Williams and Ariana Grande

from the album Funk Wav Bounces Vol. 1
- Released: 31 March 2017
- Recorded: 2016–17
- Studio: God's Eyes (Los Angeles, California); Circle House (Miami, Florida)
- Genre: Funk
- Length: 3:49
- Label: Columbia
- Songwriters: Adam Wiles; Robin Hannibal; Cecilie Karshøj; Jeffery Williams; Pharrell Williams; Brittany Hazzard; Ariana Grande
- Producers: Calvin Harris; Pharrell Williams

Calvin Harris singles chronology
"Slide" (2017)	"Heatstroke" (2017)	"Rollin" (2017)

Young Thug singles chronology
"Gang Up" (2017)	"Heatstroke" (2017)	"Trap Trap Trap" (2017)

Pharrell Williams singles chronology
"Surfin'" (2016)	"Heatstroke" (2017)	"Feels" (2017)

Ariana Grande singles chronology
"Beauty and the Beast" (2017)	"Heatstroke" (2017)	"Quit" (2017)

Audio video
- "Heatstroke" on YouTube

"Heatstroke" is a song by Scottish DJ and record producer Calvin Harris featuring American rapper Young Thug, American musician Pharrell Williams, and American singer-songwriter Ariana Grande. It is the second single from Harris' fifth studio album, Funk Wav Bounces Vol. 1 (2017). It was released on 31 March 2017 through Sony Music, following "Slide".

== Composition ==
The song was written by Calvin Harris, Robin Hannibal, Cecilie Karshøj, Young Thug, Pharrell Williams, Ariana Grande and Starrah. Initially Hannibal and Karshøj of the Danish duo Quadron were not credited as co-writers. According to Karshøj, Quadron wrote the demo version of "Heatstroke" with Williams in 2012, but when Williams released the song with Harris in March 2017, Hannibal and Karshøj were not listed as co-writers. Karshøj has a video recording of herself recording the demo vocals for "Heatstroke", which were later re-recorded by Ariana Grande. Karshøj has said that the duo receives 15 percent of the song's royalties.

Musically, "Heatstroke" combines hip-hop and dance music. news.com.au described the song as a "sun-kissed disco funk delight."

== Track listings ==
Digital download
No.	Title	Length
1.	"Heatstroke" (featuring Young Thug, Pharrell Williams & Ariana Grande)	3:43

== Credits and personnel ==
- Calvin Harris – production, Ibanez 1200 Bass, Linn LM-2, 1976 Yamaha UX Ebony Piano, Gibson SG Custom, 1965 Fender Stratocaster, Flexitone, Wurlitzer Electric Piano, Roland Jupiter-8, mixing
- Young Thug – vocals
- Pharrell Williams – additional vocal production, vocals, Fender Rhodes, additional percussion
- Ariana Grande – vocals
- Starrah – additional background vocals
- Andrew Coleman – recording
- Marcos Tovar – recording
- Matthew Desrameaux – recording assistance
- Dave Kutch – mastering

== Charts ==
=== Weekly charts ===
Weekly chart performance for "Heatsroke"
Chart (2017)	Peak position
Australia (ARIA)	23
Austria (Ö3 Austria Top 40)	64
Canada Hot 100 (Billboard)	53
Czech Republic Singles Digital (ČNS IFPI)	62
Finland Airplay (Radiosoittolista)	71
Finnish Download (Latauslista)	11
France (SNEP)	107
Germany (GfK)	85
Hungary (Single Top 40)	30
Ireland (IRMA)	33
Italy (FIMI)	71
Japan Hot 100 (Billboard)	63
Netherlands (Single Tip)	3
New Zealand Heatseekers (RMNZ)	1
Portugal (AFP)	77
Scottish Singles Sales (Official Charts)	11
Slovakia Singles Digital (ČNS IFPI)	52
Spain (Promusicae)	23
Sweden (Sverigetopplistan)	64
Switzerland (Schweizer Hitparade)	40
UK Singles (Official Charts)	25
US Billboard Hot 100	96
US Hot Dance/Electronic Songs (Billboard)	13

=== Year-end charts ===
2017 year-end chart performance for "Heatsroke"
Chart (2017)	Position
US Hot Dance/Electronic Songs (Billboard)	44

== Certifications ==
Certifications and sales for "Heatstroke"
Region	Certification	Certified units/sales
Australia (ARIA)	Platinum	70,000^{‡}
Canada (Music Canada)	Gold	40,000^{‡}
Mexico (AMPROFON)	Gold	30,000^{‡}
New Zealand (RMNZ)	Platinum	30,000^{‡}
United Kingdom (BPI)	Silver	200,000^{‡}
United States (RIAA)	Gold	500,000^{‡}
^{‡} Sales+streaming figures based on certification alone.

== Release history ==
Release dates for "Heatstroke"
Country	Date	Format	Label	Ref.
United States	31 March 2017	Digital download	Columbia	
Italy	31 March 2017	Contemporary hit radio	Sony	
United Kingdom	14 April 2017	Contemporary hit radio	Columbia	
