= Funk Wav Bounces Vol. 1 =

Studio album by Calvin Harris
- Released: 30 June 2017
- Studios: 11th Street (Atlanta); The BLE Compound; Chalice; God's Eyes; MSM; Paramount (Los Angeles); Circle House; Criteria (Miami); Glenwood Place (Burbank); Mobile Trap (United States); Westlake (West Hollywood)
- Genres: Funk; disco; post-disco; boogie
- Length: 37:40
- Label: Columbia
- Producer: Calvin Harris

Calvin Harris chronology
Motion (2014)	Funk Wav Bounces Vol. 1 (2017)	Normani x Calvin Harris (2018)

Singles from Funk Wav Bounces Vol. 1
- 1. "Slide" Released: 23 February 2017; 2. "Heatstroke" Released: 31 March 2017; 3. "Rollin" Released: 12 May 2017; 4. "Feels" Released: 16 June 2017; 5. "Faking It" Released: 17 October 2017

Funk Wav Bounces Vol. 1 is the fifth studio album by Scottish DJ and record producer Calvin Harris. It was released on 30 June 2017 by Columbia Records. The album features guest appearances by Frank Ocean, Migos, Schoolboy Q, PartyNextDoor, DRAM, Young Thug, Pharrell Williams, Ariana Grande, Future, Khalid, Travis Scott, Snoop Dogg, John Legend, Nicki Minaj, Katy Perry, Big Sean, Kehlani, Lil Yachty, and Jessie Reyez, as well as prominent writing contributions from Starrah. It is also Harris' first album not to feature his vocals.

Funk Wav Bounces Vol. 1 was supported by five singles: "Slide", "Heatstroke", "Rollin", "Feels", and "Faking It". The album received generally positive reviews from critics, and debuted at number two on both the UK Albums Chart and the US Billboard 200.

== Background and release ==
Calvin Harris announced in 2017, the release of ten upcoming singles. On 15 February, he tweeted that he had "worked with the greatest artists of our generation". Later, on 9 May, he confirmed 30 June, as the album's release date, and posted a teaser clip to social media to promote the album. The video included the various collaboraters which feature on the album on outdoor billboards in places including London and Times Square in New York City. Following its release, British newspaper The Guardian said that the album "doesn’t sound like an album laden with hits", but speculated that this was perhaps deliberate by Harris as a result of his 18 Months album containing nine commercially successful singles amongst its track list of fifteen songs. They described the album as "neither a triumph nor a disaster", and said "it shows off a noticeably broader musical range than the sound that made him famous, without really delivering anything to shock naysayers into reappraisal".

Following its release, it became an international commercial success for Harris. It debuted at number one in Canada, Finland, and on the Billboard Top Dance Albums charts in the United States. It debuted at number two in the Ireland, the United Kingdom, United States and in his native Scotland. It also reached the top ten in terrorises including New Zealand, Norway, South Korea and Switzerland. It was subsequently certified gold by the British Phonographic Industry (BPI) in the United Kingdom, indicating sales in excess of 100,000 copies, whilst in the United States it was certified platinum by the Recording Industry Association of America (RIAA) for sales in excess of 1,000,000 copies.

It was subsequently nominated for British Album of the Year at the 2017 BBC Music Awards and Top Dance/Electronic Album at the 2018 Billboard Music Awards.

== Promotion ==
The album's lead single, "Slide", was released on 23 February 2017. The song features guest vocals from American singer Frank Ocean and American rappers Quavo and Offset from the hip-hop group Migos. The album's second single, "Heatstroke", was released on 31 March 2017. The song features guest vocals from American rapper Young Thug, American singer and rapper Pharrell Williams, and American singer Ariana Grande.

The album's third single, "Rollin", was released on 12 May 2017. The song features guest vocals from American rapper Future and American singer Khalid. It was later released to rhythmic contemporary radio on 27 June 2017. The album's fourth single, "Feels", was released on 16 June 2017. The song features guest vocals from American singer-songwriters Pharrell Williams and Katy Perry, and American rapper Big Sean. It was later released to contemporary hit radio on 20 June 2017.

The album's fifth single, "Faking It", was released to contemporary hit radio on 17 October 2017. The song features guest vocals from American singer Kehlani and American rapper Lil Yachty.

== Critical reception ==
Professional ratings
Aggregate scores
Source	Rating
AnyDecentMusic?	6.6/10
Metacritic	70/100
Review scores
Source	Rating
AllMusic	4.5/5 stars
The A.V. Club	B
Consequence	B+
The Guardian	3/5 stars
The Independent	1/5 stars
NME	4/5 stars
Paste	6.7/10
Pitchfork	6.7/10
PopMatters	7/10
Slant Magazine	3/5 stars

Funk Wav Bounces Vol. 1 was met with generally positive reviews. At Metacritic, which assigns a normalised rating out of 100 to reviews from professional publications, the album received an average score of 70, based on 15 reviews. Aggregator AnyDecentMusic? gave it 6.6 out of 10, based on their assessment of the critical consensus.

Neil Z. Yeung from AllMusic gave a positive review, stating "Calvin Harris managed to find a way to distill the sounds of summer into a near-perfect spirit on his fifth effort, Funk Wav Bounces Vol. 1, assembling an all-star roster of performers for an economic ten-track burst that doesn't overstay its welcome". He summed up the review by saying "Funk Wav Bounces impresses not just with the marquee names, but with how effortless, communal and fun Harris makes it all feel". Clayton Purdom of The A.V. Club said, "It's a winning bid for artistic credibility: not going for smarter, more complex, or bigger, just better, more fun. Full of island affectations, soft-rock gloss, and chintzy good-life strings, it is, at last, the sort of fun you don’t have to feel bad about the next day". Collin Brennan of Consequence wrote: "Funk Wav Bounces isn't the kind of album that's going to change the conversation in pop music, but it doesn't want to. All it wants to do is sit by the pool, release, let go, and have a good time." Leonie Cooper of NME was also positive, saying the album is, "a triumph, a good-time album of wall-to-wall hits with a carefree, funky tropical feel and more than enough cool points to see him embraced by the hipster crowd as well as holding on to the pop kids".

In a mixed review, The Guardian's Alexis Petridis stated: "Harris seems unsure whether an 80s boogie revival is the future of either dance music or mainstream pop, however. Elsewhere, there's a sense of bets being hedged and versatility being demonstrated to varying degrees of success." Jon O'Brien of Prefix Magazine said, "Ultimately, Harris appears to have simply swapped one formula for another, and if there's to be a Funk Wav Bounces Vol. 2 he will need to discover at least a few new tricks. ... [But] there are encouraging signs here that the Harris of old hasn't been entirely lost for good". In his review, Josh Goller of Slant Magazine states, "By showing little interest in challenging the clichés of men fixated on conquest and status symbols and women focused on "feels", Harris undermines what could have been an inspired creative reinvention". In a negative review, Andy Gill of The Independent said, "It's a typical contacts-book R&B exercise, with an impressive cast of guests (including Frank, Pharrell, Snoop, Nicki, Katy, Ariana and others) on a fairly underwhelming series of grooves".

== Accolades and nominations ==
=== Year-end lists ===
Select year-end rankings of Funk Wav Bounces Vol. 1
Publication	List	Rank	Ref.
Billboard	Billboard's 50 Best Albums of 2017	7	
Complex	The Best Albums of 2017	19	
Newsweek	The 17 Best Albums of 2017	3	
Rap-Up	Rap-Up's 20 Best Albums of 2017	11	

=== Industry awards ===
Awards and nominations for Funk Wav Bounces Vol. 1
Year	Ceremony	Category	Result	Ref.
2017	BBC Music Awards	British Album of the Year	Nominated	
2017	Danish Music Awards	International Release of the Year	Nominated	
2018	Billboard Music Awards	Top Dance/Electronic Album	Nominated	

== Commercial performance ==
Funk Wav Bounces Vol. 1 debuted at number two on the UK Albums Chart with 19,000 copies sold in its first week, including 7,000 from streams. The album debuted at number two on the US Billboard 200 with 68,000 album-equivalent units—the highest position for Harris and the highest debut of any artist in the week of its release. In its first week, Funk Wav Bounces Vol. 1 sold nearly twice as many units as Harris's last album, Motion, sold in its first week.

== Track listing ==
All tracks produced by Calvin Harris.

Funk Wav Bounces Vol. 1 track listing
No.	Title	Writer(s)	Length
1.	"Slide" (featuring Frank Ocean and Migos)	Adam Wiles; Christopher Breaux; Quavious Marshall; Kiari Cephus; Kirsnick Ball	3:50
2.	"Cash Out" (featuring Schoolboy Q, PartyNextDoor and DRAM)	Wiles; Brittany Hazzard; Quincy Hanley; Shelley Massenburg-Smith; Rogét Chahayed	3:55
3.	"Heatstroke" (featuring Young Thug, Pharrell Williams and Ariana Grande)	Wiles; Jeffery Williams; Pharrell Williams; Hazzard	3:49
4.	"Rollin" (featuring Future and Khalid)	Wiles; Nayvadius Wilburn; Khalid Robinson	4:32
5.	"Prayers Up" (featuring Travis Scott and A-Trak)	Wiles; Jacques Webster; Hazzard	3:24
6.	"Holiday" (featuring Snoop Dogg, John Legend and Takeoff)	Wiles; Calvin Broadus; John Stephens; Ball; Marshall; Cephus	2:49
7.	"Skrt on Me" (featuring Nicki Minaj)	Wiles; Onika Maraj; Hazzard	3:48
8.	"Feels" (featuring Pharrell Williams, Katy Perry and Big Sean)	Wiles; P. Williams; Hazzard; Katheryn Hudson; Sean Anderson	3:43
9.	"Faking It" (featuring Kehlani and Lil Yachty)	Wiles; Jessica Reyez; Miles McCollum	4:00
10.	"Hard to Love" (featuring Jessie Reyez)	Wiles; Reyez	3:50
Total length:			37:40

== Personnel ==
Credits adapted from the album's liner notes.

Musicians

- Calvin Harris – Ibanez 1200 Bass (all tracks), Gibson SG Custom (tracks 1–3, 5, 7, 8, 10), Fender Rhodes (tracks 1, 2, 4–6, 9), Linn LM-2 (tracks 1, 3, 4, 6–8), Roland Jupiter-8 (tracks 1–5, 7), PPG Wave 2.2 (tracks 1, 4–7), Yamaha C7 Piano (tracks 1, 4, 5, 9), 1965 Fender Stratocaster (tracks 3, 4, 7, 8), Roland TR-808 (tracks 1, 5, 9), Sequential Circuits Prophet-5 (tracks 1, 6), 1976 Yamaha UX Ebony Piano (tracks 3, 8), Wurlitzer electric piano (tracks 3, 8), claps (tracks 6, 8), Flexitone (track 3), ARP String Ensemble PE-IV (track 4), SCI Drumtraks (track 10)
- A-Trak – Technics SL-1200 turntables (track 5), Pioneer DJM-S9 mixer (track 5)
- Clyde Audio – Wurlitzer (track 6)
- Big Sean – vocals (track 8)
- Rogét Chahayed – Korg SV-1 (track 2)
- DRAM – vocals (track 2)
- Frank Ocean – vocals (track 1)
- Future – vocals (track 4)
- Ariana Grande – vocals (track 3)
- John Legend – vocals (track 6)
- Katy Perry – vocals (track 8)
- Kehlani – vocals (track 9)
- Khalid – vocals (track 4)
- Lil Yachty – vocals (track 9)
- Migos – vocals (track 1)
  - Takeoff – vocals (track 6)
- Nicki Minaj – vocals (track 7)
- PartyNextDoor – vocals (track 2)
- Candice Pillay – background vocals (track 2)
- Jessie Reyez – vocals (track 10), background vocals (track 9)
- Schoolboy Q – vocals (track 2)
- Snoop Dogg – vocals (track 6)
- Starrah – additional background vocals (track 3)
- Travis Scott – vocals (track 5)
- Joe Vinyl – background vocals (track 6), strings (track 9)
- Pharrell Williams – vocals (tracks 3, 8), Fender Rhodes (track 3), additional percussion (track 3)
- Young Thug – vocals (track 3)

Production and design

- Calvin Harris – production (all tracks), recording (tracks 1, 4, 6, 10), mixing (all tracks)
- Louis Bell – additional vocal editing (track 9)
- Andrew Coleman – recording (track 3)
- Nick Cooper – vocal production (track 7)
- Aubry "Big Juice" Delaine – recording (track 7)
- Jacob Dennis – recording assistance (track 8)
- Matthew Desrameaux – recording assistance (track 3)
- Blake Harden – recording (track 5)
- David "Prep" Hughes – recording (track 2)
- Ian Findlay – recording assistance (track 8)
- Seth Firkins – recording (track 4)
- Shawn "Source" Jarrett – recording (track 3)
- Dave Kutch – mastering (all tracks)
- Mike Larson – recording (track 8)
- Thomas "Tillie" Mann – recording (track 9)
- Daryl "DJ Durel" McPherson – recording (tracks 1, 6)
- Gregg Rominiecki – recording (track 8)
- Marcos Tovar – recording (tracks 1–3, 5, 8, 9)
- Pharrell Williams – additional vocal production (track 3)
- Mark Kalman – creative direction
- Emil Nava – photography
- Uber and Kosher – art direction

== Charts ==
=== Weekly charts ===
Chart performance for Funk Wav Bounces Vol. 1
Chart (2017)	Peak position
Australian Albums (ARIA)	5
Austrian Albums (Ö3 Austria)	14
Belgian Albums (Ultratop Flanders)	14
Belgian Albums (Ultratop Wallonia)	25
Canadian Albums (Billboard)	1
Czech Albums (ČNS IFPI)	22
Danish Albums (Hitlisten)	5
Dutch Albums (Album Top 100)	5
Finnish Albums (Suomen virallinen lista)	1
French Albums (SNEP)	20
German Albums (Offizielle Top 100)	29
Greek Albums (IFPI)	66
Irish Albums (IRMA)	2
Italian Albums (FIMI)	19
Japanese Hot Albums (Billboard)	13
Japanese Albums (Oricon)	18
Latvian Albums (LaIPA)	33
New Zealand Albums (RMNZ)	3
Norwegian Albums (VG-lista)	4
Polish Albums (ZPAV)	39
Portuguese Albums (AFP)	34
Scottish Albums (Official Charts)	2
Slovak Albums (ČNS IFPI)	14
South Korean Albums (Circle)	45
South Korean International Albums (Circle)	4
Spanish Albums (Promusicae)	28
Swedish Albums (Sverigetopplistan)	4
Swiss Albums (Schweizer Hitparade)	10
Taiwanese Albums (Five Music)	3
UK Albums (Official Charts)	2
US Billboard 200	2
US Top Dance Albums (Billboard)	1

=== Year-end charts ===
2017 year-end chart performance for Funk Wav Bounces Vol. 1
Chart (2017)	Position
Australian Albums (ARIA)	90
Australian Dance Albums (ARIA)	8
Belgian Albums (Ultratop Flanders)	185
Canadian Albums (Billboard)	43
Danish Albums (Hitlisten)	71
New Zealand Albums (RMNZ)	38
South Korean International Albums (Circle)	57
Swedish Albums (Sverigetopplistan)	23
UK Albums (OCC)	98
US Billboard 200	93
US Top Dance/Electronic Albums (Billboard)	3

2018 year-end chart performance for Funk Wav Bounces Vol. 1
Chart (2018)	Position
Australian Dance Albums (ARIA)	25
US Top Dance/Electronic Albums (Billboard)	2

2019 year-end chart performance for Funk Wav Bounces Vol. 1
Chart (2019)	Position
Australian Dance Albums (ARIA)	28
US Top Dance/Electronic Albums (Billboard)	9

2020 year-end chart performance for Funk Wav Bounces Vol. 1
Chart (2020)	Position
Australian Dance Albums (ARIA)	26
US Top Dance/Electronic Albums (Billboard)	14

2021 year-end chart performance for Funk Wav Bounces Vol. 1
Chart (2021)	Position
Australian Dance Albums (ARIA)	37
US Top Dance/Electronic Albums (Billboard)	15

2022 year-end chart performance for Funk Wav Bounces Vol. 1
Chart (2022)	Position
Australian Dance Albums (ARIA)	37
US Top Dance/Electronic Albums (Billboard)	10

2023 year-end chart performance for Funk Wav Bounces Vol. 1
Chart (2023)	Position
Australian Dance Albums (ARIA)	38
US Top Dance/Electronic Albums (Billboard)	18

2024 year-end chart performance for Funk Wav Bounces Vol. 1
Chart (2024)	Position
US Top Dance/Electronic Albums (Billboard)	22

2025 year-end chart performance for Funk Wav Bounces Vol. 1
Chart (2025)	Position
US Top Dance Albums (Billboard)	24

== Certifications ==
Certifications for Funk Wav Bounces Vol. 1
Region	Certification	Certified units/sales
Australia (ARIA)	Gold	35,000^{‡}
Brazil (Pro-Música Brasil)	Gold	20,000^{‡}
Canada (Music Canada)	2× Platinum	160,000^{‡}
Denmark (IFPI Danmark)	Platinum	20,000^{‡}
Mexico (AMPROFON)	Platinum	60,000^{‡}
New Zealand (RMNZ)	3× Platinum	45,000^{‡}
Poland (ZPAV)	Gold	10,000^{‡}
Singapore (RIAS)	Gold	5,000^{*}
Sweden (GLF)	Gold	20,000^{‡}
Switzerland (IFPI Switzerland)	Platinum	20,000^{‡}
United Kingdom (BPI)	Gold	100,000^{‡}
United States (RIAA)	Platinum	1,000,000^{‡}
^{*} Sales figures based on certification alone.^{‡} Sales+streaming figures based on certification alone.

== See also ==
- List of Billboard number-one electronic albums of 2017
- List of number-one albums of 2017 (Canada)
- List of number-one albums of 2017 (Finland)
