= Feels (song) =

Single by Calvin Harris featuring Pharrell Williams, Katy Perry and Big Sean

from the album Funk Wav Bounces Vol. 1
- Released: 15 June 2017
- Studio: God's Eyes Studios (Los Angeles, California); Glenwood Plce Studios (Burbank, California); Westlake Recording Studios (West Hollywood, California); Mobile Trap Studios
- Genre: Disco-funk; ska
- Length: 3:43
- Label: Columbia
- Songwriters: Adam Wiles; Pharrell Williams; Brittany Hazzard; Katy Perry; Sean Anderson; Maurice White; Wayne Vaughn
- Producer: Calvin Harris

Calvin Harris singles chronology
"Rollin" (2017)	"Feels" (2017)	"Faking It" (2017)

Pharrell Williams singles chronology
"Heatstroke" (2017)	"Feels" (2017)	"Sangria Wine" (2018)

Katy Perry singles chronology
"Swish Swish" (2017)	"Feels" (2017)	"Save as Draft" (2017)

Big Sean singles chronology
"Jump Out the Window" (2017)	"Feels" (2017)	"Pull Up N Wreck" (2017)

Music video
- "Feels" on YouTube

"Feels" is a song by the Scottish DJ and record producer Calvin Harris featuring the American musicians Pharrell Williams, Katy Perry and Big Sean. It was released on 15 June 2017 through Columbia Records as the fourth single from Harris's fifth album, Funk Wav Bounces Vol. 1 (2017). Starrah assisted the artists in writing the song.

"Feels" peaked at number one in Belgium, Iceland, Israel, Latvia, Lebanon, Poland, and the United Kingdom. Elsewhere, it charted within the top ten in Argentina, Australia, Austria, Canada, Costa Rica, the Czech Republic, Denmark, Finland, France, Germany, Hungary, Ireland, Malaysia, the Netherlands, New Zealand, Norway, Panama, Paraguay, Portugal, Slovakia, Serbia, Slovenia and Switzerland as well as the top 20 in Italy, Sweden and the United States. Emil Nava directed two music videos for the song, which respectively premiered in June and August 2017.

== Background and release ==
During 2011, Harris was planned to open for Katy Perry in the latter's California Dreams Tour. When he cancelled his appearance on the tour, it caused a disagreement between the two. According to her, they eventually "bumped into each other" during a Vanity Fair Oscar party. Harris then said that he had a song Perry should "check out". She later agreed and collaborated in the song. Other than Perry, Pharrell Williams and Big Sean collaborated in the song. Starrah helped write the song; the song was produced by Harris himself. Harris announced his fifth album, titled Funk Wav Bounces Vol. 1 on 9 May 2017. On 14 June, Harris revealed that he would release the fourth single from the album, titled "Feels". The post included the single's cover art and credits. The song was released on 15 June, before the album's release date on 30 June.

== Composition ==
"Feels" is a disco-funk and ska song The bassline and chord progression of the song bear resemblance to "Let's Groove" (1981) by Earth, Wind & Fire; its authors, Maurice White and Wayne Vaughn, were later acknowledged in the song's credits.

== Critical reception ==
Andy Cush of Spin called the song "a little flimsy" while also noting that "the groove is unimpeachable" and that "It has a skillful melange of sounds from the mid-70s apex of analog recording, the era of disco and yacht rock: a warm and rounded bassline, some Nile Rodgers-style guitar, a slick descending line on Fender Rhodes". Rolling Stone's Elia Leight said that the song is "a simple, lighthearted loop, which combines punctual ska guitar, a playful keyboard line and charming squeaks that recall a cartoon character's slip on a banana peel". Brent Faulkner from The Musical Hype said the song is undercooked, leaving more to be desired, adding that it's "the type of record that is pleasing more because of the sound than the lyricism". Erin Van Der Meer from Grazia said the song was so "right this minute" that it "almost feels forced".

Krystal Rodriguez of Vice reported that the song was "primed for summertime play" and "yet another contender for song of the summer". Rodriguez further said that the song had a "laidback beat" perfect for pool parties and sitting beneath the sun. Saeed Saeed of The National said that "Feels" was the highlight of the album, further stating that it had Pharrell Williams' strongest vocal performance since "Blurred Lines".

== Commercial performance ==
In the US, "Feels" debuted at number 50 on the Billboard Hot 100 and reached a peak of 20, making it Harris' eighth top 20 hit, as well as Perry's eighteenth. It spent eighteen weeks on the Billboard Hot 100. "Feels" peaked at number five on the Canadian charts, giving Perry her eighteenth top ten in the country. In Harris' native United Kingdom, "Feels" topped the UK Singles Chart, making it Harris' eighth, Williams' fourth, Perry's fifth, and Sean's first chart-topping single on the chart. Across the world, and especially in Europe, the song met a widespread acclaim, reaching the summit in Wallonia, Croatia, Iceland and Israel. It also reached the top ten in Finland, Czech Republic, Austria, The Netherlands, Slovenia and France, among others, top twenty in Sweden, Italy, Colombia and Guatemala, top thirty in Spain and Philippines and top forty in Japan.

== Music videos ==
The song's accompanying music video was uploaded to Harris' Vevo channel on YouTube on 26 June 2017. The clip was directed by Emil Nava. In the video, Harris, Williams, Perry and Big Sean lounge around on a desert island in tropical-themed attire. Perry is seen frolicking in the grass, Williams in a boat, and Big Sean in the beachside. A second video, also directed by Nava, followed two months later. It features all four artists as a band playing the track in front of a live audience and receiving applause for their performance.

== Accolades ==
=== Awards and nominations ===
Name of award, year listed, category, and result
Award	Year	Category	Result	Ref.
MTV Video Music Awards	2017	Best Collaboration	Nominated	
NRJ Music Awards	2017	Video of the Year	Nominated	
The Official Number One Awards (Note: The Number One Award for singles was first introduced by the Official Charts Company (OCC) in December 2011, followed by the introduction of the Number One Award for albums in 2015.)	2017	Number One Single	Won	
The Official Vodafone Big Top 40 Number One Awards (Note: The Official Vodafone Big Top 40 Number One Awards were introduced in 2009 and are given to artists who top the Big Top 40 chart. They are awarded for each week they spend at number one.)	2017	Number One Award	Won	
The Official Vodafone Big Top 40 Number One Awards	2017	Number One Award	Won	
Planeta Awards	2017	Best Hip-hop/R&B Song of the Year	Won	
Vevo Certified Awards	2017	Vevo Certified Award	Won	
Brit Awards	2018	British Single of the Year	Nominated	
Brit Awards	2018	British Video of the Year	Eliminated	
Spotify Awards	2023	Billion-Play Award (Note: Spotify awards plaques to artists when their songs reach a billion streams on the platform.)	Won	

=== Listicles ===
Name of publication, year listed, name of listicle, and result
Publication	Year	Listicle	Result	Ref.
Billboard	2017	Best Songs of the Year: Critics' Picks	59th	
Cosmopolitan UK	2017	Best Songs of the Year	20th	
HuffPost	2017	Best Summer Songs of the Year	Placed	
NME	2017	Best Summer Songs of the Year	Placed	

== Track listings ==
Digital download
No.	Title	Length
1.	"Feels" (featuring Pharrell Williams, Katy Perry & Big Sean)	3:43

== Personnel ==
Credits adapted from the song's liner notes.

- Calvin Harris – composition, production, mixing, Ibanez 1200 Bass, Linn LinnDrum, 1976 Yamaha Ux Ebony Piano, Gibson SG Custom, 1965 Fender Stratocaster, Wurlitzer electric piano, claps
- Pharrell Williams – vocals, composition
- Katy Perry – vocals, composition
- Big Sean – vocals, composition
- Brittany Hazzard – composition
- Mike Larson – recording
- Marcos Tovar – recording
- Gregg Rominiecki – recording
- Jacob Dennis – recording assistance
- Iain Findlay – recording assistance
- Dave Kutch – mastering

== Charts ==
=== Weekly charts ===
Weekly chart performance for "Feels"
Chart (2017)	Peak position
Argentina (Monitor Latino)	7
Australia (ARIA)	3
Australia Dance (ARIA)	1
Austria (Ö3 Austria Top 40)	5
Belgium (Ultratop 50 Flanders)	3
Belgium (Ultratop 50 Wallonia)	1
Bolivia (Monitor Latino)	3
Canada Hot 100 (Billboard)	5
Canada AC (Billboard)	28
Canada CHR/Top 40 (Billboard)	11
Canada Hot AC (Billboard)	14
CIS Airplay (TopHit)	53
Chile (Monitor Latino)	15
Colombia (National-Report)	12
Colombia (Promúsica)	14
Costa Rica (Monitor Latino)	8
Croatia (HRT)	1
Czech Republic Airplay (ČNS IFPI)	5
Czech Republic Singles Digital (ČNS IFPI)	5
Denmark (Tracklisten)	4
Ecuador (National-Report)	19
El Salvador (Monitor Latino)	12
Finland (Suomen virallinen lista)	10
France (SNEP)	6
Germany (GfK)	9
Greece Digital Songs (Billboard)	8
Guatemala (Monitor Latino)	17
Hungary (Dance Top 40)	2
Hungary (Rádiós Top 40)	2
Hungary (Single Top 40)	4
Hungary (Stream Top 40)	9
Iceland (Tónlistinn)	1
Ireland (IRMA)	3
Israel International Airplay (Media Forest)	1
Italy (FIMI)	20
Japan Hot 100 (Billboard)	31
Lebanon (OLT20)	1
Malaysia (RIM)	4
Mexico (Billboard Mexican Airplay)	21
Mexico Streaming (AMPROFON)	12
Netherlands (Dutch Top 40)	6
Netherlands (Mega Top 50)	8
Netherlands (Single Top 100)	9
New Zealand (Recorded Music NZ)	2
Norway (VG-lista)	5
Panama (Monitor Latino)	9
Paraguay (Monitor Latino)	6
Philippines (Philippine Hot 100)	22
Poland Airplay (ZPAV)	1
Poland Dance (ZPAV)	8
Portugal (AFP)	8
Russia Airplay (TopHit)	49
Scottish Singles Sales (Official Charts)	2
Slovakia Airplay (ČNS IFPI)	6
Slovakia Singles Digital (ČNS IFPI)	4
Slovenia (SloTop50)	4
South Korea International (Gaon)	21
Spain (Promusicae)	25
Sweden (Sverigetopplistan)	18
Switzerland (Schweizer Hitparade)	6
UK Singles (Official Charts)	1
Ukraine Airplay (TopHit)	61
Uruguay (Monitor Latino)	8
US Billboard Hot 100	20
US Adult Pop Airplay (Billboard)	16
US Dance Club Songs (Billboard)	15
US Hot Dance/Electronic Songs (Billboard)	1
US Hot R&B/Hip-Hop Songs (Billboard)	10
US Pop Airplay (Billboard)	8
US Rhythmic Airplay (Billboard)	7
Venezuela (National-Report)	24

=== Monthly charts ===
Monthly chart performance for "Feels"
Chart (2017)	Peak position
Russia Airplay (TopHit)	57

=== Year-end charts ===
2017 year-end chart performance for "Feels"
Chart (2017)	Position
Argentina Airplay (Monitor Latino)	37
Australia (ARIA)	28
Austria (Ö3 Austria Top 40)	44
Belgium (Ultratop Flanders)	19
Belgium (Ultratop Wallonia)	18
Brazil (Pro-Música Brasil)	157
Bolivia Airplay (Monitor Latino)	88
Canada (Canadian Hot 100)	32
Colombia Airplay (Monitor Latino)	59
Costa Rica Airplay (Monitor Latino)	16
Chile Airplay (Monitor Latino)	80
Denmark (Tracklisten)	42
El Salvador Airplay (Monitor Latino)	20
France (SNEP)	25
Germany (Official German Charts)	59
Honduras Airplay (Monitor Latino)	51
Hungary (Dance Top 40)	30
Hungary (Rádiós Top 40)	34
Hungary (Single Top 40)	24
Hungary (Stream Top 40)	27
Iceland (Tónlistinn)	23
Italy (FIMI)	69
Latvia Airplay (LaIPA)	8
Mexico Airplay (Monitor Latino)	77
Netherlands (Dutch Top 40)	31
Netherlands (Single Top 100)	43
New Zealand (Recorded Music NZ)	30
Nicaragua Airplay (Monitor Latino)	69
Paraguay Airplay (Monitor Latino)	56
Panama Airplay (Monitor Latino)	79
Peru Airplay (Monitor Latino)	70
Poland Airplay (ZPAV)	35
Portugal (AFP)	42
Slovenia Airplay (SloTop50)	35
Spain Airplay (PROMUSICAE)	39
Sweden (Sverigetopplistan)	82
Switzerland (Schweizer Hitparade)	50
UK Singles (OCC)	24
Uruguay Airplay (Monitor Latino)	67
US Billboard Hot 100	74
US Hot Dance/Electronic Songs (Billboard)	10
US Hot R&B/Hip-Hop Songs (Billboard)	38
US Mainstream Top 40 (Billboard)	42
US Rhythmic (Billboard)	46

2018 year-end chart performance for "Feels"
Chart (2018)	Position
Argentina Airplay (Monitor Latino)	26
Colombia Airplay (Monitor Latino)	95
France (SNEP)	188
Hungary (Dance Top 40)	13
Hungary (Rádiós Top 40)	72
Portugal (AFP)	181
US Hot Dance/Electronic Songs (Billboard)	72

== Certifications and sales ==
Certifications and sales for "Feels"
Region	Certification	Certified units/sales
Australia (ARIA)	6× Platinum	420,000^{‡}
Austria (IFPI Austria)	Platinum	30,000^{‡}
Belgium (BRMA)	Platinum	20,000^{‡}
Brazil (Pro-Música Brasil)	Diamond	250,000^{‡}
Canada (Music Canada)	6× Platinum	480,000^{‡}
Denmark (IFPI Danmark)	2× Platinum	180,000^{‡}
France (SNEP)	Diamond	233,333^{‡}
Germany (BVMI)	Platinum	400,000^{‡}
Italy (FIMI)	2× Platinum	100,000^{‡}
Mexico (AMPROFON)	Diamond+2× Platinum+Gold	450,000^{‡}
New Zealand (RMNZ)	5× Platinum	150,000^{‡}
Norway (IFPI Norway)	4× Platinum	240,000^{‡}
Poland (ZPAV)	3× Platinum	60,000^{‡}
Portugal (AFP)	Platinum	10,000^{‡}
South Korea	—	173,266 (Note: South Korea sales figures as of December 2017.)
Spain (Promusicae)	Platinum	40,000^{‡}
Switzerland (IFPI Switzerland)	Platinum	20,000^{‡}
United Kingdom (BPI)	3× Platinum	1,800,000^{‡}
United States (RIAA)	3× Platinum	3,000,000^{‡}
Streaming
Greece (IFPI Greece)	Gold	1,000,000^{†}
Sweden (GLF)	3× Platinum	24,000,000^{†}
^{‡} Sales+streaming figures based on certification alone.^{†} Streaming-only figures based on certification alone.

== Release history ==
"Feels" release history
Region	Date	Format	Label(s)	Ref.
Various	15 June 2017	Digital download	Columbia; Sony	
Italy	16 June 2017	Radio airplay	Sony	
United States	20 June 2017	Contemporary hit radio	Columbia	
