= Pray to God (song) =

2015 single by Calvin Harris featuring Haim

Single by Calvin Harris featuring Haim

from the album Motion
- Released: 6 March 2015
- Studio: Fly Eye (London); Henson (Los Angeles)
- Genre: House
- Length: 3:52
- Label: Deconstruction; Fly Eye; Columbia
- Songwriters: Calvin Harris; Alana Haim; Danielle Haim; Este Haim; Ariel Rechtshaid
- Producer: Calvin Harris

Calvin Harris singles chronology
"Open Wide" (2015)	"Pray to God" (2015)	"How Deep Is Your Love" (2015)

Haim singles chronology
"My Song 5" (2014)	"Pray to God" (2015)	"Want You Back" (2017)

Music video
- "Pray to God" on YouTube

"Pray to God" is a song by Scottish DJ and record producer Calvin Harris featuring American rock band Haim. It was released on 6 March 2015 as the sixth and final single from Harris's fourth studio album, Motion (2014). The song received generally positive reviews from music critics, and attained moderate commercial success, reaching the top 10 in Australia, whilst claiming a top-40 position in the United Kingdom—his second single to miss the top 10 since 2010. The song is co-produced and co-written by Haim's regular producer Ariel Rechtshaid.

== Composition ==
"Pray to God" is a house song. According to the sheet music published at MusicNotes.com, it is written in the key of G minor. It has a tempo of 126 bpm. Daniel Kreps of Rolling Stone said the song recalled Fleetwood Mac-esque harmonies.

== Music video ==
The music video for "Pray to God" was directed by Emil Nava and premiered on 10 February 2015.

The video features Haim wearing all-black clothes in a variety of natural settings, including snow-capped mountains and the woods, surrounded by animals such as wolves, rabbits, bears, eagles, and lions, and riding horses.

== Track listings ==
CD single
No.	Title	Length
1.	"Pray to God" (featuring Haim)	3:54
2.	"Pray to God" (featuring Haim) (Calvin Harris vs. Mike Pickering Hacienda remix)	3:44

Digital download – remix
No.	Title	Length
1.	"Pray to God" (featuring Haim) (Calvin Harris vs. Mike Pickering Hacienda remix)	3:44

Digital download – extended remix
No.	Title	Length
1.	"Pray to God" (featuring Haim) (Calvin Harris vs. Mike Pickering Hacienda remix)	7:33

Digital download – Remixes
No.	Title	Length
1.	"Pray to God" (featuring Haim) (R3hab Remix)	4:31
2.	"Pray to God" (featuring Haim) (Calvin Harris vs. Mike Pickering Hacienda Remix)	3:43

== Credits and personnel ==
Credits adapted from the liner notes of Motion.

=== Recording ===
- Recorded at Fly Eye Studio (London) and Henson Studios (Los Angeles)
- Mixed at Larrabee Studios
- Mastered at The Exchange Mastering Studios (London)

=== Personnel ===
- Calvin Harris – instruments, production
- Haim – vocals
- Danielle Haim – guitars
- Ariel Rechtshaid – keyboards, additional production
- Manny Marroquin – mixing
- Chris Galland – mixing assistance
- Ike Schultz – mixing assistance
- Mike Marsh – mastering

== Charts ==
=== Weekly charts ===
Weekly chart performance for "Pray to God"
Chart (2015)	Peak position
Australia (ARIA)	10
Australia Dance (ARIA)	3
Austria (Ö3 Austria Top 40)	15
Belgium (Ultratip Bubbling Under Flanders)	2
Belgium (Ultratop 50 Wallonia)	36
Canada Hot 100 (Billboard)	68
France (SNEP)	59
Germany (GfK)	23
Hungary (Dance Top 40)	17
Hungary (Rádiós Top 40)	3
Hungary (Single Top 40)	15
Ireland (IRMA)	21
Lebanon (OLT 20)	16
Mexico (Billboard Mexican Airplay)	13
Mexico Anglo (Monitor Latino)	6
Netherlands (Dutch Top 40)	25
Netherlands (Single Top 100)	59
New Zealand (Recorded Music NZ)	39
Norway (VG-lista)	35
Poland Dance (ZPAV)	20
Poland (Video Chart)	5
Poland (Polish Airplay New)	4
Scottish Singles Sales (Official Charts)	25
Slovenia (SloTop50)	14
Sweden (Sverigetopplistan)	71
Switzerland (Schweizer Hitparade)	61
UK Singles (Official Charts)	35
UK Dance (Official Charts)	7
US Bubbling Under Hot 100 (Billboard)	6
US Dance Club Songs (Billboard)	31
US Hot Dance/Electronic Songs (Billboard)	8
US Pop Airplay (Billboard)	27

=== Year-end charts ===
Year-end chart performance for "Pray to God"
Chart (2015)	Position
Australia (ARIA)	83
Germany (Official German Charts)	94
Hungary (Dance Top 40)	62
Hungary (Rádiós Top 40)	65
Hungary (Single Top 40)	62
US Hot Dance/Electronic Songs (Billboard)	34

== Certifications ==
Certifications for "Pray to God"
Region	Certification	Certified units/sales
Australia (ARIA)	2× Platinum	140,000^{‡}
Brazil (Pro-Música Brasil)	Gold	30,000^{‡}
Canada (Music Canada)	Gold	40,000^{‡}
Germany (BVMI)	Gold	200,000^{‡}
Mexico (AMPROFON)	Gold	30,000^{‡}
New Zealand (RMNZ)	Gold	7,500^{*}
Norway (IFPI Norway)	Gold	20,000^{‡}
United Kingdom (BPI)	Gold	400,000^{‡}
United States (RIAA)	Gold	500,000^{‡}
^{*} Sales figures based on certification alone.^{‡} Sales+streaming figures based on certification alone.

== Release history ==
Release dates and formats for "Pray to God"
Region	Date	Format	Label	Ref.
Ireland	6 March 2015	Digital download	Deconstruction; Fly Eye; Columbia	
United Kingdom	9 March 2015	Digital download	Deconstruction; Fly Eye; Columbia	
Italy	27 March 2015	Radio airplay	Sony	
Germany	10 April 2015	CD single	Sony	
United States	21 April 2015	Contemporary hit radio	Columbia	
