= Blame (Calvin Harris song) =

2014 single by Calvin Harris ft. John Newman

Single by Calvin Harris featuring John Newman

from the album Motion
- B-side: "C.U.B.A"
- Released: 5 September 2014
- Studio: Fly Eye, Miloco Arcadium (London, United Kingdom)
- Genre: EDM
- Length: 3:26
- Label: Deconstruction; Fly Eye; Columbia
- Songwriters: Calvin Harris; John Newman; James Newman
- Producers: Calvin Harris; John Newman

Calvin Harris singles chronology
"Summer" (2014)	"Blame" (2014)	"Outside" (2014)

John Newman singles chronology
"Out of My Head" (2014)	"Blame" (2014)	"Come and Get It" (2015)

Audio sample
- file; help

Music video
- "Blame" on YouTube

"Blame" is a song by British DJ and record producer Calvin Harris from his fourth studio album, Motion (2014). It was released as the album's third single on 5 September 2014. The song features the vocals of British singer John Newman and is included on the deluxe edition of Newman's second studio album, Revolve. Newman's brother James Newman assisted the artists in writing the song, with Harris serving as the producer.

The song received positive reviews from music critics, who complimented its production and Newman's vocals. "Blame" entered at the top of the UK Singles Chart, becoming Harris's seventh number-one single (and third consecutive) on the chart and Newman's third.

== Background ==
John Newman initially approached Calvin Harris via Twitter about collaborating on a song he had worked on. Newman sent a demo with his vocals and a few chords and Harris built the music around it. Newman wrote all the lyrics.

The single and its artwork were announced on Twitter on 8 June 2014. However, a different artwork cover was uploaded onto the iTunes Store as a replacement. "Blame" was originally scheduled for release on 25 August, but was delayed until 7 September.

In August and September 2014, Harris released fifteen-second previews of the track on his Instagram account. John Newman commented on the song: "It will live up to the hype that's been built. I'm very excited about it, I think it's the next step up in my career." The song is written in the key of C minor, at a tempo of 128 beats per minute. Newman's vocal range spans from B♭_{3} to B♭_{5}.

== Critical reception ==
The song received positive reviews from music critics. Robbie Daw of Idolator praised the song saying: "'Blame' somehow feels fuller and more rounded-out, structurally, than much of [Harris'] other output. Call it a new era for the Scottish producer/DJ." MTV Australia described the song as "hot" and "sure to have the crowd singing loud and proud". Digital Spy's Lewis Corner gave the song a four star rating out of five, commenting: "Luckily for Calvin, everything he touches these days seems to turn more golden than his glowing tan. Guest vocalist John Newman soulfully insists on the surging bridge, before it bursts into one of Calvin's infectious four-to-the-floor choruses. It barely shifts away from the formula that's enabled him to achieve 1 billion Spotify streams, but when it's proving itself that effective, why resign the Midas Touch?" James Rainis of Slant particularly praised Newman's vocals, and noted how the song provided "sophistication to a pop style that emphasizes brute force."

We Got This Covered gave a positive review, noting that it was "a bit slower and more down tempo than most of his usual stuff" and said "John Newman's soulful vocals go down smoothly as they layer a very catchy melody that soon breaks out into a full-on dance floor hit. Admittedly, it doesn't grab you quite like Summer did, but it's still a great song and one that will surely do very well." Music and Lyrics gave a more nuanced review, writing the song "hasn't honestly hit as hard as 'Summer' did on the first listen, but I'll definitely label it as a 'grower'. Not really feeling John's verses, but he really shines in the let's-go-to-church hook. 'Blame' doesn't have the best Calvin Harris EDM beat I've heard to date, but I can still bop to it."

== Commercial performance ==
"Blame" entered the UK Singles Chart at number one with 70,312 copies sold in its first week, becoming Harris's seventh UK number one and Newman's third. In the United States, the song debuted at number thirty-one on the Billboard Hot 100 chart dated 27 September 2014, peaking at number nineteen on 15 November 2014. The single topped the charts in Finland, the Netherlands, Norway and Sweden, while charting within the top five in Austria, Germany, Ireland and Italy, and the top ten in Australia, Denmark, France, New Zealand and Spain.

== Music video ==
The music video was directed by Emil Nava and released on 12 September 2014. It was filmed in Los Angeles and London in August 2014. The video begins with both Harris and Newman in separate places in their appropriate houses where they are both on the bed. Newman is watching some models who are seen on a film projector. Meanwhile, the models decided to go to a nightclub where one girl gets drunk while other models split where they fall into a sink, beer cooler, puddle and finally a tub. The video ends with the models ending up in a river where they are freezing and it shows the sky with the sun in the background.

== Track listings ==
Digital download
No.	Title	Length
1.	"Blame" (featuring John Newman)	3:34

CD single and UK digital download
No.	Title	Length
1.	"Blame" (featuring John Newman)	3:26
2.	"C.U.B.A"	4:29

Digital download — remixes
No.	Title	Length
1.	"Blame" (Jacob Plant Remix)	4:56
2.	"Blame" (R3HAB Club Remix)	4:20
3.	"Blame" (R3HAB Trap Remix)	3:32
4.	"Blame" (BURNS Remix)	4:17

Remixes (digital release)^{a}
No.	Title	Length
1.	"Blame" (Jacob Plant Remix)	4:56
2.	"Blame" (R3HAB Club Remix)	4:20
3.	"Blame" (R3HAB Trap Remix)	3:32
4.	"Blame" (BURNS Remix)	4:17
5.	"Blame" (Extended Version)	5:30

^a Released on 25 September 2015. First release of "Remixes" in lossless format. Includes the "Extended Version" of "Blame" in addition to the previously released songs found on the original "Remixes" release.

== Personnel ==
Credits adapted from the liner notes of Motion.

- Calvin Harris – all instruments, arrangement, mixing, production
- John Newman – vocals
- Seb Berrios – additional vocal engineering
- Simon Davey – mastering
- Arthur Indrikovs – vocal engineering

== Charts ==
=== Weekly charts ===
Weekly chart performance for "Blame"
Chart (2014–2015)	Peak position
Australia (ARIA)	9
Australia Dance (ARIA)	2
Austria (Ö3 Austria Top 40)	4
Belgium (Ultratop 50 Flanders)	7
Belgium Dance (Ultratop Flanders)	3
Belgium (Ultratop 50 Wallonia)	2
Belgium Dance (Ultratop Wallonia)	1
Canada Hot 100 (Billboard)	11
Canada CHR/Top 40 (Billboard)	2
Canada Hot AC (Billboard)	18
CIS Airplay (TopHit)	2
Colombia (National-Report)	18
Czech Republic Airplay (ČNS IFPI)	8
Czech Republic Singles Digital (ČNS IFPI)	1
Denmark (Tracklisten)	6
Euro Digital Song Sales (Billboard)	2
Finland (Suomen virallinen lista)	1
France (SNEP)	7
Germany (GfK)	4
Hungary (Rádiós Top 40)	1
Hungary (Single Top 40)	2
Hungary (Dance Top 40)	1
Ireland (IRMA)	5
Israel International Airplay (Media Forest)	3
Italy (FIMI)	4
Japan Hot 100 (Billboard)	48
Mexico Airplay (Billboard)	1
Lebanon (OLT20)	3
Netherlands (Dutch Top 40)	1
Netherlands (Single Top 100)	3
Netherlands (Mega Dance Top 30)	1
New Zealand (Recorded Music NZ)	9
Norway (VG-lista)	1
Poland Airplay (ZPAV)	4
Poland Dance (ZPAV)	5
Russia Airplay (TopHit)	2
Scottish Singles Sales (Official Charts)	1
Slovakia Airplay (ČNS IFPI)	1
Slovakia Singles Digital (ČNS IFPI)	1
Slovenia (SloTop50)	11
South Africa Airplay (EMA)	4
Spain (Promusicae)	9
Sweden (Sverigetopplistan)	1
Switzerland (Schweizer Hitparade)	4
UK Singles (Official Charts)	1
UK Dance (Official Charts)	1
Ukraine Airplay (TopHit)	13
US Billboard Hot 100	19
US Adult Pop Airplay (Billboard)	24
US Dance Club Songs (Billboard)	5
US Hot Dance/Electronic Songs (Billboard)	1
US Latin Pop Airplay (Billboard)	17
US Pop Airplay (Billboard)	3
US Rhythmic Airplay (Billboard)	21

=== Year-end charts ===
2014 year-end chart performance for "Blame"
Chart (2014)	Position
Australia (ARIA)	73
Australia Dance (ARIA)	13
Austria (Ö3 Austria Top 40)	75
Belgium (Ultratop 50 Flanders)	82
Belgium Dance (Ultratop Flanders)	29
Belgium (Ultratop 50 Wallonia)	73
Belgium Dance (Ultratop Wallonia)	15
Canada (Canadian Hot 100)	81
Denmark (Tracklisten)	35
France (SNEP)	75
Germany (Official German Charts)	40
Hungary (Dance Top 40)	40
Hungary (Rádiós Top 40)	39
Hungary (Single Top 40)	23
Italy (FIMI)	48
Netherlands (Dutch Top 40)	23
Netherlands (Single Top 100)	29
Netherlands (Mega Dance Top 30)	5
Russia Airplay (TopHit)	29
Sweden (Sverigetopplistan)	42
Switzerland (Schweizer Hitparade)	45
Ukraine Airplay (TopHit)	94
UK Singles (OCC)	37
US Hot Dance/Electronic Songs (Billboard)	15

2015 year-end chart performance for "Blame"
Chart (2015)	Position
Brazil (Crowley)	74
Canada (Canadian Hot 100)	97
CIS (TopHit)	37
France (SNEP)	114
Hungary (Rádiós Top 40)	96
Hungary (Single Top 40)	76
Netherlands (Dutch Top 40)	76
Netherlands (Dance Top 30)	28
Netherlands (NPO 3FM)	95
Russia Airplay (TopHit)	40
Slovenia (SloTop50)	48
Spain (PROMUSICAE)	79
Ukraine Airplay (TopHit)	79
US Hot Dance/Electronic Songs (Billboard)	8
US Mainstream Top 40 (Billboard)	46

=== Decade-end charts ===
2010s-end chart performance for "Blame"
Chart (2010–2019)	Position
US Hot Dance/Electronic Songs (Billboard)	37

== Certifications ==
Certifications and sales for "Blame"
Region	Certification	Certified units/sales
Australia (ARIA)	4× Platinum	280,000^{‡}
Brazil (Pro-Música Brasil)	2× Diamond	500,000^{‡}
Canada (Music Canada)	4× Platinum	320,000^{‡}
Denmark (IFPI Danmark)	2× Platinum	180,000^{‡}
Germany (BVMI)	Platinum	400,000^{‡}
Italy (FIMI)	2× Platinum	60,000^{‡}
Mexico (AMPROFON)	2× Diamond+Platinum+Gold	690,000^{‡}
New Zealand (RMNZ)	3× Platinum	90,000^{‡}
Norway (IFPI Norway)	3× Platinum	30,000^{‡}
Portugal (AFP)	Gold	10,000^{‡}
Spain (Promusicae)	Platinum	40,000^{‡}
Switzerland (IFPI Switzerland)	Gold	15,000^{^}
United Kingdom (BPI)	3× Platinum	1,800,000^{‡}
United States (RIAA)	3× Platinum	3,000,000^{‡}
Streaming
Denmark (IFPI Danmark)	Platinum	2,600,000^{†}
Spain (Promusicae)	Platinum	8,000,000^{†}
^{^} Shipments figures based on certification alone.^{‡} Sales+streaming figures based on certification alone.^{†} Streaming-only figures based on certification alone.

== Release history ==
Release dates for "Blame"
Region	Date	Format	Label
Italy	5 September 2014	Radio airplay	Sony
Australia	7 September 2014	Digital download	Sony
France	7 September 2014	Digital download	Sony
New Zealand	7 September 2014	Digital download	Sony
Germany	7 September 2014	Digital download	Sony
Ireland	7 September 2014	Digital download	Sony
United Kingdom	7 September 2014	Digital download	Sony
United States	7 September 2014	Digital download	Sony
United States	9 September 2014	Mainstream airplay	Columbia
Germany	3 October 2014	CD	Sony
