= Slide (Calvin Harris song) =

2017 single by Calvin Harris featuring Frank Ocean and Migos

Single by Calvin Harris featuring Frank Ocean and Migos

from the album Funk Wav Bounces Vol. 1
- Released: 23 February 2017
- Recorded: 2016
- Studio: God's Eyes (Los Angeles); Chalice Recording (Los Angeles)
- Genre: Nu-disco; dance-pop
- Length: 3:50: 3:15 (radio edit)
- Label: Columbia
- Songwriters: Adam Wiles; Christopher Breaux; Quavious Marshall; Kiari Cephus
- Producer: Calvin Harris

Calvin Harris singles chronology
"My Way" (2016)	"Slide" (2017)	"Heatstroke" (2017)

Frank Ocean singles chronology
"Nikes" (2016)	"Slide" (2017)	"Chanel" (2017)

Migos singles chronology
"T-Shirt" (2017)	"Slide" (2017)	"Gucci on My" (2017)

"Slide" is a song by Scottish DJ and record producer Calvin Harris featuring American singer Frank Ocean and American hip-hop group Migos as the lead single from the former's fifth studio album, Funk Wav Bounces Vol. 1, released on 23 February 2017 through Sony Music.

== Background ==
The song was announced on 21 February 2017, and its release came just two days later, with Quavo and Offset being billed under the Migos name. It is the first collaboration between any of the three acts, as well as Ocean's first collaboration as an independent artist, as Harris' liner notes of "Slide" list Ocean as appearing courtesy of himself.

== Composition ==
"Slide" is a "sultry, piano-tipped grooving" nu-disco song that combines hip hop and dance music. Its production features "handclapped-styled beats and pitched background vocals", and has elements of funk, R&B, and pop. Fact has described the songwriting of "Slide" as "pop songwriting". The song begins with the verses sung by Ocean in a pitch shifted voice: "I might/Empty my bank account/And buy that Boy with a Pipe." Referring to the lyric, Ocean explains that it is an allusion to: "A Picasso painting that sold for so much money." The Picasso in question is Garçon à la pipe, painted during the artist's Rose Period, which was auctioned off for $104 million at Sotheby's in 2004. Elsewhere in the song, Migos' Offset raps, "Swallow the bottle while I sit back and smoke gelato/ Walk in my mansion 20 thousand paintin' Picasso/ Bitches be dippin', dabbin' with niggas like a nacho/ Take off her panties, diamonds dancin' like Rick Ricardo."

== Reception ==
"Slide" received mostly positive reviews. Ryan Dombal of Pitchfork gave it the title of "Best New Track", writing that "[Frank Ocean's] deadpan instantly adds shade and nuance to the dayglo surroundings, suggesting a weariness big pop rarely allows. The effect is magnetic and a little startling, like Jeff Tweedy rapping over a Dr. Dre beat". He adds that "Migos' Quavo and Offset, known for twisting tongues over dank trap, come off like a winning insurance plan as they adapt to this more traditional pop showcase with ease."

Spencer Kornhaber of The Atlantic gave it a mixed to positive review, saying that "the divides between Ocean, Migos, and Harris's sensibilities couldn't be clearer, but the song is a reminder of pop's power to make very different elements slide together", and concluding that Frank Ocean's "team-up with Calvin Harris and Migos on 'Slide', scrambles some expectations, but mostly just sounds like summer".

Las Vegas Review-Journal published that "'Slide' carries a mixture of the depth and warmth of analog instrumentation alongside modern vocal production, arrangement and mixing and showcases Calvin's music abilities and prowess to the best".

== Credits and personnel ==
Credits adopted from Tidal

- Calvin Harris – production, Yamaha C7 Piano, Sequential Circuits Prophet 5, Fender Rhodes, Gibson SG Custom, Ibanez 1200 Bass, Linn LM-2, Roland TR-808, PPG Wave 2.2, Roland Jupiter-8, mixing
- Frank Ocean – vocals
- Migos – vocals
- Mike Marsh – mastering

== Charts ==
=== Weekly charts ===
Weekly chart performance for "Slide"
Chart (2017)	Peak position
Australia (ARIA)	11
Austria (Ö3 Austria Top 40)	34
Belgium (Ultratop 50 Flanders)	10
Belgium (Ultratop 50 Wallonia)	15
Canada Hot 100 (Billboard)	16
Colombia (National-Report)	69
Czech Republic Airplay (ČNS IFPI)	38
Czech Republic Singles Digital (ČNS IFPI)	24
Denmark (Tracklisten)	7
France (SNEP)	19
France Airplay (SNEP)	6
Germany (GfK)	25
Hungary (Rádiós Top 40)	24
Hungary (Single Top 40)	34
Hungary (Stream Top 40)	22
Ireland (IRMA)	12
Italy (FIMI)	34
Japan Hot 100 (Billboard)	52
Lebanon (Lebanese Top 20)	16
Malaysia (RIM)	16
Mexico Airplay (Billboard)	40
Netherlands (Dutch Top 40)	10
Netherlands (Single Top 100)	21
New Zealand (Recorded Music NZ)	7
Norway (VG-lista)	25
Philippines (Philippine Hot 100)	46
Poland Airplay (ZPAV)	57
Portugal (AFP)	10
Scottish Singles Sales (Official Charts)	8
Slovakia Airplay (ČNS IFPI)	78
Slovakia Singles Digital (ČNS IFPI)	2
Slovenia (SloTop50)	39
South Korea International (Gaon)	35
Spain (PROMUSICAE)	66
Sweden (Sverigetopplistan)	32
Switzerland (Schweizer Hitparade)	25
UK Singles (Official Charts)	10
US Billboard Hot 100	25
US Adult Pop Airplay (Billboard)	37
US Dance Club Songs (Billboard)	25
US Hot Dance/Electronic Songs (Billboard)	4
US Hot R&B/Hip-Hop Songs (Billboard)	13
US Pop Airplay (Billboard)	9
US Rhythmic Airplay (Billboard)	2

=== Year-end charts ===
2017 year-end chart performance for "Slide"
Chart (2017)	Position
Australia (ARIA)	41
Belgium (Ultratop Flanders)	40
Belgium (Ultratop Wallonia)	68
Canada (Canadian Hot 100)	39
Denmark (Tracklisten)	23
France (SNEP)	81
Hungary (Stream Top 40)	76
Latvia Airplay (LaIPA)	15
Netherlands (Dutch Top 40)	75
Netherlands (Single Top 100)	63
New Zealand (Recorded Music NZ)	19
Portugal (AFP)	40
Sweden (Sverigetopplistan)	100
Switzerland (Schweizer Hitparade)	70
UK Singles (Official Charts Company)	34
US Billboard Hot 100	71
US Hot Dance/Electronic Songs (Billboard)	8
US Hot R&B/Hip-Hop Songs (Billboard)	34
US Mainstream Top 40 (Billboard)	49
US Rhythmic (Billboard)	16

== Certifications ==
Certifications and sales for "Slide"
Region	Certification	Certified units/sales
Australia (ARIA)	6× Platinum	420,000^{‡}
Austria (IFPI Austria)	Gold	15,000^{‡}
Belgium (BRMA)	Platinum	20,000^{‡}
Brazil (Pro-Música Brasil)	Platinum	60,000^{‡}
Canada (Music Canada)	7× Platinum	560,000^{‡}
Denmark (IFPI Danmark)	2× Platinum	180,000^{‡}
France (SNEP)	Diamond	333,333^{‡}
Germany (BVMI)	Gold	200,000^{‡}
Italy (FIMI)	Platinum	50,000^{‡}
Mexico (AMPROFON)	3× Platinum+Gold	210,000^{‡}
New Zealand (RMNZ)	6× Platinum	180,000^{‡}
Poland (ZPAV)	Platinum	20,000^{‡}
Portugal (AFP)	Platinum	10,000^{‡}
Spain (Promusicae)	Gold	20,000^{‡}
Sweden (GLF)	2× Platinum	80,000^{‡}
Switzerland (IFPI Switzerland)	Platinum	20,000^{‡}
United Kingdom (BPI)	2× Platinum	1,200,000^{‡}
United States (RIAA)	5× Platinum	5,000,000^{‡}
^{‡} Sales+streaming figures based on certification alone.

== Release history ==
Release dates for "Slide"
Region	Date	Format	Label	Ref.
Various	23 February 2017	Digital download	Sony; Columbia	
Italy	3 March 2017	Contemporary hit radio	Sony	
United Kingdom	3 March 2017	Contemporary hit radio	Sony; Columbia	
United States	7 March 2017	Top 40 radio	Columbia	
