= List of awards and nominations received by Ellie Goulding =

Ellie Goulding awards and nominations
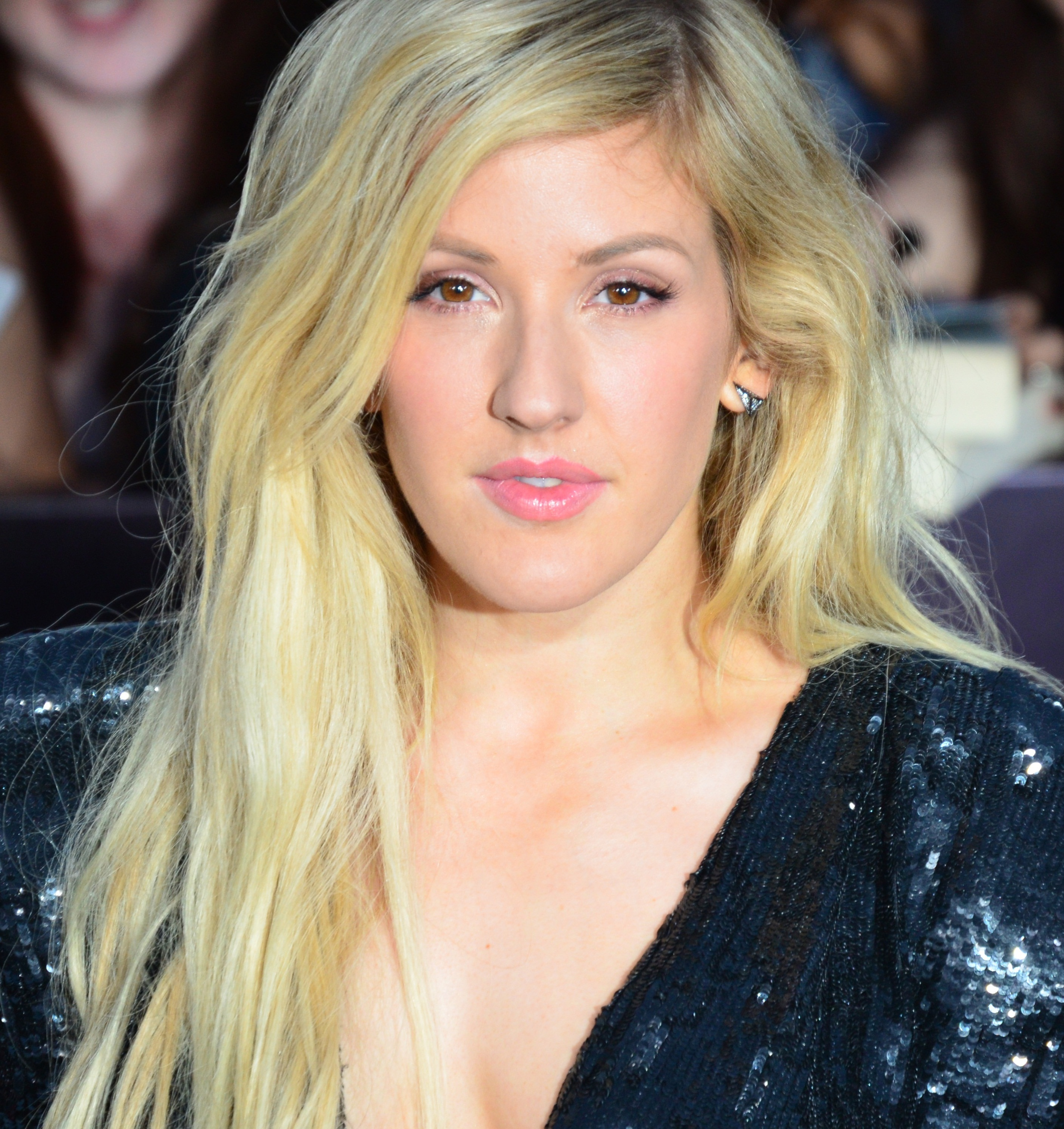
- Goulding in 2014
Awards and nominations
Award	Wins	Nominations
Billboard Music Awards	1	6
Brit Awards	2	12
BPI	1	0
Cannes Lions	1	1
EDMAs	0	11
Glamour Awards	2	2
Grammy Awards	0	2
iHeartRadio Music Awards	1	4
Los Premios 40 Principales	2	3
MTV Video Music Awards	0	3
MTV Europe Music Awards	0	5
MTV Italian Music Awards	1	1
NRJ Music Award	1	3
People's Choice Awards	0	1
Time100 Impact Awards	1	0
Teen Choice Awards	1	3
United Nations Foundation	2	0
Variety Hitmakers Awards	1	0
World Music Awards	0	10

Totals (Note: Certain award groups do not simply award one winner. They acknowledge several different recipients, have runners-up, and have third place. Since this is a specific recognition and is different from losing an award, runner-up mentions are considered wins in this award tally. For simplification and to avoid errors, each award in this list has been presumed to have had a prior nomination.)
- Wins: 35
- Nominations: 100

The English singer-songwriter Ellie Goulding has won 35 awards from 100 nominations. Among her awards, Goulding has seventeen BMI London Awards (including the BMI President's Awards), two Brit Awards, a Brits Billion Award, a Billboard Music Award, two Glamour Awards, a Global Award, one MTV Italian Music Award, an NRJ Music Award, a Q Award, a Time100 Impact Award, a Teen Choice Award and Variety's Decade Award. Goulding has received two nominations at the Grammy Awards in the categories Best Pop Solo Performance (2016) and Best Pop Dance Recording (2024). At the 2019 Variety Hitmakers Awards ceremony, she was honored with the Decade Award.

For her constant activism on climate-change awareness and support to LGBTQ+ community, Goulding has been honored with the Ally Award by the Attitude Awards, the Global Leadership Award (2017) and named Humanitarian of the Year (2022) by the United Nations Foundation and in the Time100 Impact Awards with the Impact Award. In 2023, Goulding was awarded with The Praeses Elit Award from Trinity College Dublin, which is given to those who have left an impact in their respective fields.

On January 10, 2024. Goulding was announced as the 11th recipient of the Perfect World Foundation Award and was named Conservationist of the Year 2024.

== Attitude Awards ==
The Attitude Awards showcase the very best of the global LGBTQ community and give a platform to role models while supporting the Attitude Magazine Foundation, which raises money for LGBT causes. Goulding was honored with the Ally Award at the 2022 Virgin Atlantic Attitude Awards ceremony.

Year	Category	Nominated work	Result	Ref.
2022	Ally Award	Ellie Goulding	Won	

== A&R Awards ==
The A&R Awards is an annual UK-focused awards ceremony presented by Music Business Worldwide in London. Goulding has received one nomination.

Year	Category	Nominated work	Result	Ref.
2023	Song of the Year	"Miracle" (with Calvin Harris)	Nominated	

== BBC Music Awards ==
The BBC Music Awards are the BBC's inaugural pop music awards, first held in December 2015, as a celebration of the musical achievements over the past 12 months. The live award ceremony, broadcast simultaneously across BBC One, BBC Radio 1 and BBC Radio 2, was held at London's Earl's Court on 11 December 2014 and presented by BBC Radio's Chris Evans and Fearne Cotton.

Year	Category	Nominated work	Result	Ref.
2015	Song of the Year	"Love Me Like You Do"	Nominated	

== BBC Sound of... ==
The BBC Sound of... is an annual poll by music critics and industry figures with the purpose to find the most promising new music talent. A 10-strong longlist is published at the end of the year, with a ranked shortlist and annual winner announced the following January. Ellie Goulding was named the Sound of 2010, coming in first place. She made history as the second artist to won the BBC Sound of... and Critics' Choice Award at the 2010 BRIT Awards, both in the same year, with the first being Adele.

Year	Category	Nominated work	Result	Ref.
2010	Sound of 2010	Ellie Goulding	Won	

== Billboard Music Awards ==
The Billboard Music Awards are held to honor artists for commercial performance in the U.S., based on record charts published by Billboard. The awards are based on sales data by Nielsen SoundScan and radio information by Nielsen Broadcast Data Systems. Goulding has received a total of six nominations with one win.

Year	Category	Nominated work	Result	Ref.
2013	Top Streaming Song (Audio)	"Lights"	Nominated	
2013	Pop Song of the Year	"Lights"	Nominated	
2013	Pop Artist of the Year	Ellie Goulding	Nominated	
2014	Milestone Award	Ellie Goulding	Nominated	
2016	Top Radio Artist	Ellie Goulding	Nominated	
2020	Top Electronic/Dance Song	"Close To Me"	Won	

== BMI Awards ==
The BMI Awards are held annually by Broadcast Music, Inc. to award songwriters in various genres. Ellie Goulding, has won a total of 17 BMI Awards.

In 2022, Goulding was honoured with the prestigious BMI President's Award.

=== BMI London Awards ===
Year	Category	Nominated work	Result	Ref.
2013	Pop Songs	"Lights"	Won	
2014	Song of the Year	"I Need Your Love" (featuring Calvin Harris)	Nominated	
2014	Pop Songs	"I Need Your Love" (featuring Calvin Harris)	Won	
2014	Pop Songs	"Anything Could Happen"	Won	
2014	Pop Songs	"Burn"	Won	
2015	Award Winning Songs	"Burn"	Won	
2016	Award Winning Songs	"Outside" (with Calvin Harris)	Won	
2016	Award Winning Songs	"On My Mind"	Won	
2017	Award Winning Songs	"Something in the Way You Move"	Won	
2020	Pop Songs	"Close To Me" (feat. Diplo & Swae Lee)	Won	
2020	Pop Songs	"Hate Me" (with Juice Wrld)	Won	
2022	President's Award	Ellie Goulding	Won	

== Berlin Music Video Awards ==
The Berlin Music Video Awards is an annual international festival held in Berlin, Germany to honor the most creative and inspiring music videos from across the globe. Goulding has received one nomination.

Year	Category	Nominated work	Result	Ref.
2020	Best VFX	"Hate Me" (with Juice Wrld)	Nominated	

== BreakTudo Awards ==
The BreakTudo Awards are a Brazilian award show that recognizes the best in music, television, internet, and film. Goulding has received one nomination.

Year	Category	Nominated work	Result	Ref.
2023	International Collaboration	"Miracle" (with Calvin Harris)	Nominated	

== Brit Awards ==
The Brit Awards (sometimes stylised as the BRIT Awards; often simply called the Brits) are the British Phonographic Industry's annual pop music awards, and the British equivalent of the American Grammy Awards. Ellie Goulding has won twice out of 12 nominations and received a special award in 2023.

Year	Category	Nominated work	Result	Ref.
2010	Critics' Choice	Ellie Goulding	Won	
2011	Best British Female	Ellie Goulding	Nominated	
2011	Best British Breakthrough Act	Ellie Goulding	Nominated	
2014	Best Female Solo Artist	Ellie Goulding	Won	
2014	British Single of the Year	"Burn"	Nominated	
2014	British Video	"Burn"	Nominated	
2014	British Single of the Year	"I Need Your Love" (feat. Ellie Goulding)	Nominated	
2014	British Video	"I Need Your Love" (feat. Ellie Goulding)	Nominated	
2016	British Single	"Love Me Like You Do"	Nominated	
2016	British Artist Video of the Year	"Love Me Like You Do"	Nominated	
2017	British Female Solo Artist	Ellie Goulding	Nominated	
2024	Song of the Year	"Miracle" (with Calvin Harris)	Nominated	

=== British Phonographic Industry (BPI) ===
Goulding was among the inaugural winners of the Brits Billion Award, which recognize artists who have achieved over one billion digital streams in the United Kingdom.

Year	Award	Nominee / work	Result	Ref.
2023	Brits Billion Award	Ellie Goulding	Won	

== British LGBT Awards ==
The British LGBT Awards are a British award show that aim to "recognise individuals and organizations that display outstanding commitment to the LGBT community". Goulding has been awarded once.

Year	Award	Nominee / work	Result	Ref.
2019	Celebrity Ally	Ellie Goulding	Won	
2022	Celebrity Ally	Ellie Goulding	Nominated	

== BT Digital Music Awards ==
The BT Digital Music Awards (DMA) was a British music award ceremony held annually for 10 years from 2002 to 2011 (with no ceremony in 2009). Music industry professionals nominated artists, venues and hardware into the Judge's Choice award categories. The rest of the awards were made up of People's Choice Awards, voted for by the public. Goulding has received three nominations.

Year	Category	Nominated work	Result	Ref.
2010	Best Female Artist	Ellie Goulding	Nominated	
2011	Best Female Artist	Ellie Goulding	Nominated	
2011	Best Song	"Your Song"	Nominated	

== Cannes Lions International Festival of Creativity ==
The Cannes Lions International Festival of Creativity celebrates the best of creativity in brand communication, advertising, and related fields. Ellie Goulding, alongside collaborators Chris Ketley and Joe Kearns, won the Silver Lion in the Entertainment Music category at the 2017 ceremony for their original composition in the online advert "Break The Routine" which was made to raise awareness about domestic violence by the National Centre for Domestic Violence and Victim Support in the United Kingdom.

Year	Category	Nominated work	Result	Ref.
2017	Silver Lion for Use of Original Composition	“Break The Routine” usage of "Avail", an original composition by Ellie Goulding, Chris Ketley and Joe Kearns for the NCDV and Victim Support campaign, UK.	Won	

== Cosmopolitan's Ultimate Women of the Year Awards ==
The Cosmopolitan's Ultimate Women of the Year Awards are hosted by Cosmopolitan UK magazine every year. These awards focus on celebrating women from a range of fields including: entertainment, sports, business and music. Goulding was awarded with the Ultimate Music Star Award in 2013.

Year	Category	Nominated work	Result	Ref.
2013	Ultimate Music Star	Ellie Goulding	Won	

== Danish Music Awards ==
The Danish Music Awards (DMA) is a Danish award show. The show has been arranged by IFPI since 1989, and was originally called IFPI-prisen ("IFPI-Award") until 1991, when it changed its name to Dansk Grammy ("Danish Grammy"). The current name was given in 2001, after the American Grammy Awards registered the name Grammy as their trademark. Goulding has received one nomination.

Year	Category	Nominated work	Result	Ref.
2015	International hit	"Love Me Like You Do"	Nominated	

== Electronic Dance Music Awards ==
The Electronic Dance Music Awards (also known as EDMAs) is an annual music award show focusing on electronic dance music. Goulding has received eleven nominations.

Year	Category	Nominated work	Result	Ref.
2018	Best Remix Collaboration	"First Time" (with Kygo) [Danny Dove & Nathan C Remix]	Nominated	
2023	Artist of The Year (Female)	Ellie Goulding	Nominated	
2024	Best Collaboration	"Miracle" (with Calvin Harris)	Nominated	
2024	Main Stage/Festival Song of the Year	"Miracle" (with Calvin Harris)	Nominated	
2024	Music Video of the Year	"Miracle" (with Calvin Harris)	Nominated	
2024	Remix of the Year	"Miracle" (with Calvin Harris) [Mau P Remix]	Nominated	
2025	Pop-Dance Anthem of the Year	"Free" (with Calvin Harris)	Nominated	
2026	Dance/Electropop Song of the Year	"Hypnotized" (with Anyma)	Nominated	
2026	Best Collaboration	"Hypnotized" (with Anyma)	Nominated	
2026	Best Collaboration	"Save My Love" (with Marshmello & Avaion)	Nominated	
2026	Dance Radio Song of the Year	"Save My Love" (with Marshmello & Avaion)	Nominated	

== EMA Awards ==
The Environmental Media Association (EMA) Awards recognizes productions for environmental excellence. At the 33rd annual ceremony, Goulding's concert film "Monumental: Ellie Goulding at Kew Gardens" earned a nomination for Best Variety Television and won.

Year	Category	Nominated work	Result	Ref.
2024	Best Variety Television	"Monumental: Ellie Goulding at Kew Gardens"	Won	

== Latin American Music Awards ==
The Latin American Music Awards (Latin AMAs) is an annual American music award to be presented by Telemundo. It is the Spanish-language counterpart of the American Music Awards (AMAs) produced by the Dick Clark Productions. Goulding received one nomination.

Year	Category	Nominated work	Result	Ref.
2015	Favorite Crossover Artist	Ellie Goulding	Nominated	

== Los 40 Music Awards ==
Los 40 Music Awards is an award show by the musical radio station Los 40. Created in 2006 to celebrate the fortieth anniversary of the founding of the worldwide station. Goulding has received two awards out of three nominations.

Year	Category	Nominated work	Result
2015	Best International Act	Ellie Goulding	Won
2015	Best International Song	"Love Me Like You Do"	Won
2023	Best International Song	"Miracle" (with Calvin Harris)	Nominated

== Lo Nuestro Awards ==
Lo Nuestro Awards, also known as Premios Lo Nuestro, is a Spanish-language awards show honoring the best of Latin music. Goulding has been nominated once.

Year	Category	Nominated work	Result	Ref.
2026	Crossover Collaboration of the Year	"I Adore You" (with Hugel, J Balvin, Topic, Arash, and Daecolm)	Nominated	

== Glamour Awards ==
The Glamour Awards is hosted by Glamour magazine every year to hand out different awards to honor extraordinary and inspirational women from a variety of fields, including entertainment, business, sports, music, science, medicine, education, and politics. Goulding has won twice.

Year	Category	Nominated work	Result	Ref.
2011	Pandora Breakthrough Artist	Ellie Goulding	Won	
2015	Cointreau Solo Artist	Ellie Goulding	Won	

== Global Awards ==
The Global Awards celebrate the stars of music, news & entertainment across genres in the UK and from around the world. Ellie Goulding has received a total of 5 nominations with one win.

Year	Category	Nominated work	Result	Ref.
2020	Best Female	Herself	Nominated	
2020	Best British Artist or Group	Herself	Nominated	
2020	Mass Appeal Award	Herself	Nominated	
2024	Best Song	"Miracle" (with Calvin Harris)	Nominated	
2024	Most Played Song of the Year	"Miracle" (with Calvin Harris)	Won	

== Grammy Awards ==
A Grammy Award is an accolade by the National Academy of Recording Arts and Sciences (NARAS) of the United States to recognize outstanding achievement in the music industry. The annual presentation ceremony features performances by prominent artists, and the presentation of those awards that have a more popular interest. Goulding has received two nominations.

Year	Nominee / work	Award	Result	Ref.
2016	"Love Me Like You Do"	Best Pop Solo Performance	Nominated	
2024	"Miracle"	Best Pop Dance Recording	Nominated	

== Guild of Music Supervisors Awards ==
The Guild of Music Supervisors Awards recognize music supervisors in 14 categories, representing movies, television, games and trailers. Goulding received one nomination as a recording artist for "Love Me Like You Do" from Fifty Shades of Grey in 2016.

Year	Category	Nominated work	Result	Ref.
2016	Best Song/Recording Created for a Film	"Love Me Like You Do"	Nominated	

== Harper's Bazaar Women of the Year Awards ==
The Harper's Bazaar Women of the Year Awards are an annual award issue and event that honors truly inspiring women from the worlds of fashion, film, culture, the arts and philanthropy. Goulding was awarded as the Musician of the Year Award in 2015 by the magazine.

Year	Category	Nominated work	Result	Ref.
2015	Musician of the Year	Ellie Goulding	Won	

== Hollywood Music In Media Awards ==
The Hollywood Music in Media Awards (HMMA) is an award organization honoring original music (Song and Score) in all forms visual media including film, TV, video games, trailers, commercial advertisements, documentaries, music videos and special programs. Goulding has received one nomination.

Year	Category	Nominated work	Result	Ref.
2019	Best Original Song - Documentary	Our Planet (shared with Steven Price)	Nominated	

== Hungarian Music Awards ==
The Hungarian Music Awards have been given to artists in the field of Hungarian music, as well international music since 1992. The award categories are similar to Grammy Awards in the United States and Brit Awards in the United Kingdom. Goulding has won once.

Year	Category	Nominated work	Result	Ref.
2016	International Modern Pop-Rock Album of the Year	Delirium	Won	

== Ibiza Music Video Festival ==
Year	Nominee / work	Award	Result
2015	"Love Me Like You Do"	Best Director	Nominated

== iHeartRadio Music Awards ==
The iHeartRadio Music Awards is a music awards show that celebrates music heard throughout the year across iHeartMedia radio stations nationwide and on iHeartRadio, iHeartMedia's digital music platform. Goulding has received one award from four nominations.

Year	Nominee / work	Award	Result	Ref.
2016	"Love Me Like You Do"	Best Song from a Movie	Nominated	
2017	"Still Falling for You"	Best Song from a Movie	Nominated	
2020	"Close To Me"	Dance Song of the Year	Won	
2026	"Save My Love	Dance Song of the Year	Nominated	

== International Dance Music Awards ==
The International Dance Music Awards (also known as IDMA) is an annual music award show focusing on electronic dance music across the globe. Goulding has received one nomination.

Year	Category	Nominated work	Result	Ref.
2026	Best Song (Dance)	"Hypnotized" (with Anyma)	Nominated	

== Jimmie Awards ==
Year	Category	Nominated work	Result
2013	Best New Artist	Ellie Goulding	Nominated
2014	Best Female – International	Ellie Goulding	Won

== Melhores do Ano Atrevida ==
Year	Category	Nominated work	Result	Ref.
2015	Partnership of the Year	"Powerful" (featuring Major Lazer and Tarrus Riley)	Nominated	

== MOBO Awards ==
The MOBO Awards for "Music of Black Origin" were established in 1996 by Kanya King and Andy Ruffell. The MOBO Award show is held annually in the United Kingdom to recognise artists of any ethnicity or nationality performing black music. In 2009, the awards ceremony was held in Glasgow for the first time. Prior to that, it had been held in London. It was nominated once.

Year	Category	Nominated work	Result
2011	Best UK Act	Ellie Goulding	Nominated

== MP3 Music Awards ==
Year	Category	Nominated work	Result
2010	The BNC Award	Ellie Goulding	Nominated

== MTV Awards ==
=== MTV Video Music Awards ===
An MTV Video Music Award (commonly abbreviated as a VMA) is an award presented by the cable channel MTV to honor the best in the music video medium. Originally conceived as an alternative to the Grammy Awards (in the video category), the annual MTV Video Music Awards ceremony has often been called the "Super Bowl for youth", an acknowledgment of the VMA ceremony's ability to draw millions of youth from teens to 20-somethings each year. Ellie was nominated three times.

Year	Category	Nominated work	Result
2013	Best Collaboration	"I Need Your Love" (Featuring Calvin Harris)	Nominated
2013	Best Song of the Summer	"I Need Your Love" (Featuring Calvin Harris)	Nominated
2015	Female Video	"Love Me like You Do"	Nominated

=== MTV Europe Music Awards ===
The MTV Europe Music Awards (EMAs or EMA) are an event presented by MTV Networks Europe which awards prizes to musicians and performers. Ellie was nominated five times.

Year	Nominated work	Category	Result
2010	Ellie Goulding	Best UK & Ireland Act	Nominated
2013	Ellie Goulding	Best UK & Irish Act	Nominated
2014	Ellie Goulding	Best World Stage Performance	Nominated
2015	Ellie Goulding	Best Female	Nominated
2015	"Love Me like You Do"	Best Song	Nominated
2016	Ellie Goulding	Best World Stage Performance	Nominated

=== MTV Italian Music Awards ===
The TRL Awards were established in 2006 by MTV Italy to celebrate the most popular artists and music videos in Italy. Goulding has already won once.

Year	Category	Nominated work	Result	Ref.
2015	Best Tormentone	"Love Me Like You Do"	Won	

== NRJ Music Award ==
Year	Category	Nominated work	Result	Ref.
2015	Révélation Internationale de l'Année	Ellie Goulding	Won	
2023	Collaboration Internationale de l'année	"Miracle" (with Calvin Harris)	Nominated	
2023	Chanson Internationale de l'Année	"Miracle" (with Calvin Harris)	Nominated	

== O Music Awards ==
Year	Category	Nominated work	Result
2013	Most Innovative Music Video	"Lights"	Nominated

== People's Choice Awards ==
The People's Choice Awards is an American awards show, recognizing people in entertainment, voted online by the fans and general public. Goulding has received one nomination.

Year	Category	Nominated work	Result	Ref.
2016	Favorite Song of the Year	"Love Me Like You Do"	Nominated	

== Perfect World Foundation Award ==
Goulding is the first musician to be named Conservationist of the Year and the eleven recipient by The Perfect World Foundation.

Year	Category	Nominated work	Result	Ref.
2024	Conservation Award	Ellie Goulding	Won	

== Playing For Change Foundation ==
The Playing for Change Foundation is a non-profit organization, which builds music and art schools for children around the world. At the 2024 ceremony Goulding has been named one of the honorees of the Impact Award for her work as an artist and philanthropist.

Year	Category	Nominated work	Result	Ref.
2024	Impact Award	Ellie Goulding	Won	

== Popjustice £20 Music Prize ==
Year	Category	Nominated work	Result	Ref.
2015	Best British Pop Single	"Love Me Like You Do"	Nominated	
2016	Best British Pop Single	"Something In The Way You Move"	Nominated	
2023	Best British Pop Single	"Easy Lover" (featuring Big Sean)	Nominated	

== Q Awards ==
The Q Awards were an annual British music awards run by the music magazine Q which recognized the excellence in music. Goulding received four nominations and one win.

Year	Category	Nominated work	Result	Ref.
2010	Best Female Artist	Ellie Goulding	Nominated	
2010	Best Breakthrough Artist	Ellie Goulding	Nominated	
2013	Best Solo Artist	Ellie Goulding	Won	
2013	Best Track	"Burn"	Nominated	

== Radio Disney Music Awards ==
The Radio Disney Music Awards honor the most popular and played artists for the previous years. Goulding has received one nomination.

Year	Category	Nominated work	Result	Ref.
2016	Best Crush Song	"Love Me Like You Do"	Nominated	

== Rolling Stone UK Awards ==
The Rolling Stone UK Awards is an annual British music awards hosted by the magazine of the same name, which honors the world's greatest music, film and television of the year. Goulding received one nomination in 2023.

Year	Category	Nominated work	Result	Ref.
2023	Song of the Year	"Miracle" (with Calvin Harris)	Nominated	

== Shorty Awards ==
The Shorty Awards highlights the best content across the social media landscape including Tumblr, YouTube, Instagram, and Vine. Goulding received one nomination in 2016.

Year	Category	Nominated work	Result	Ref.
2016	Content of the Year: Singer	Ellie Goulding	Nominated	

== Spotify Awards ==
Year	Category	Nominated work	Result	Ref.
2020	Most-Streamed EDM Female Artist	Ellie Goulding	Nominated	

== Trinity College Dublin ==
The Trinity College Dublin is the sole constituent college of the University of Dublin, Ireland. The Praeses Elit Award was founded by former auditor of LawSoc and first female president of Ireland, Mary Robinson, and is awarded to those who have excelled in their work and had a vast impact in their respective fields. In 2023, Goulding was awarded with The Praeses Elit Award.

Year	Category	Nominated work	Result	Ref.
2023	Praeses Elit Award	Ellie Goulding	Won	

== Teen Choice Awards ==
The Teen Choice Awards were an annual awards show that honored the year's biggest achievements in music, film, television, and more. Goulding has received one award out of three nominations.

Year	Category	Nominated work	Result	Ref.
2012	Choice Breakout Artist	Ellie Goulding	Nominated	
2015	Choice Music: TV or Movie Song	"Love Me like You Do"	Nominated	
2019	Choice Electronic/Dance Song	"Close to Me (Red Velvet Remix)"	Won	

== Time100 Impact Awards ==
In March 2022, Goulding was the recipient of a Time100 Impact Award in recognition of her longstanding work toward advancing climate change awareness.

Year	Category	Nominated work	Result	Ref.
2022	Impact Award	Ellie Goulding	Won	

== United Nations Foundation ==
The United Nations Foundation in New York has recognized Goulding work as an activist twice. First in 2017, with the Global Leadership Award for her environmental and social justice activism, and in 2022 with the Humanitarian of the Year Award for her work raising the profile of fossil fuel-funded conflicts, including in Ukraine, and her support for refugees from conflict zones and the frontline of the climate crisis. With the Deputy Secretary-General stating: "Ms. Ellie Goulding has helped to inspire a new generation of environmental activists with passion and purpose to change mindsets away from nature-harming activities to nature-nurturing behaviour."

Year	Category	Nominated work	Result	Ref.
2017	Global Leadership Award	Ellie Goulding	Won	
2022	Humanitarian of the Year	Ellie Goulding	Won	

== UK Festival Awards ==
Year	Category	Nominated work	Result	Ref.
2010	Best Breakthrough Artist	Ellie Goulding	Nominated	
2010	Critics' Choice Award	Underage Festival	Nominated	

== UK Music Video Awards ==
The UK Music Video Awards is an annual award ceremony that recognize the creativity, technical excellence and innovation in music video and moving image for music. Goulding has received one nomination.

Year	Category	Nominated work	Result	Ref.
2011	Best Urban Video	"Wonderman" (shared with Tinie Tempah)	Nominated	

== Variety Hitmakers Awards ==
The Variety Hitmakers Awards recognizes the writers, producers, publishers, managers and executives who helped make – and break – the most consumed songs of the year. At the 2019 ceremony, Ellie Goulding has been named the recipient of Variety's Decade Award.

Year	Category	Nominated work	Result	Ref.
2019	Decade Award	Ellie Goulding	Won	

== Virgin Media Music Awards ==
The Virgin Media Music Awards were an annual awards ceremony run by Virgin Media, recognizing achievements in the music industry and announcing winners on its official website. Goulding received two nominations in 2010.

Year	Category	Nominated work	Result	Ref.
2010	Best Newcomer	Ellie Goulding	Nominated	
2010	Best Album	"Lights"	Nominated	

== World Music Awards ==
The World Music Awards were presented to the world's best-selling artists in a number of categories and to the best-selling artists from each major territory. Goulding scored ten nominations in 2014.

Year	Category	Nominated work	Result	Ref.
2014	World's Best Female Artist	Ellie Goulding	Nominated	
2014	World's Best Live Act	Ellie Goulding	Nominated	
2014	World's Best Entertainer	Ellie Goulding	Nominated	
2014	World's Best Song	"Burn"	Nominated	
2014	World's Best Video	"Burn"	Nominated	
2014	World's Best Song	"How Long Will I Love You"	Nominated	
2014	World's Best Video	"How Long Will I Love You"	Nominated	
2014	World's Best Song	"I Need Your Love" (with Calvin Harris)	Nominated	
2014	World's Best Video	"I Need Your Love" (with Calvin Harris)	Nominated	
2014	World's Best Album	Halcyon	Nominated	

== Žebřík Music Awards ==
The Žebřík Music Awards is a Czech awards show organized by music and style magazine iReport to honor the best artists in Czech Republic and internationally. Goulding has received three nominations.

Year	Category	Nominated work	Result	Ref.
2015	Best International Discovery	Ellie Goulding	Nominated	
2015	Best International Female	Ellie Goulding	Nominated	
2016	Best International Live	Ellie Goulding	Nominated	

== Listicles ==
Name of publisher, name of listicle, year(s) listed, and placement result
Publisher	Listicle	Year(s)	Position	Ref.
Academy Awards	91 Best Original Songs Vie for 2016 Oscar®	2016	Shortlisted ("Still Falling for You")	
AllMusic	The Best Pop Albums of 2020	2020	Listed (Brightest Blue)	
AllMusic	The Best Pop Albums of 2023	2023	Listed (Higher Than Heaven)	
Apple Music	The 500 Most-Played Songs on Apple Music of All-Time	2025	382nd ("Love Me Like You Do")	
Associated Press	The Best Albums of 2020	2020	10th (Brightest Blue)	
BBC	The Best Songs of 2023	2023	Honorable Mention ("Miracle")	
BBC	Sound Of.. 2010	2010	1st	
Billboard	The 100 Best Deep Cuts by 21st Century Pop Stars	2017	55th ("My Blood")	
Billboard	Greatest of All Time Pop Songs Artists	2017	48th	
Billboard	Billboard's Top Artists of the 2010s	2019	78th	
Billboard	Greatest of All Time Songs of the Summer	2021	242nd ("Lights")	
Billboard	The Top 15 Dance-Pop Collaborations of All Time	2022	15th ("Outside")	
Billboard	Top 60 EDM Love Songs of All Time	2023	28th ("I Need Your Love")	
Billboard	The 50 Best Albums Of 2023 So Far: Staff Picks	2023	Listed (Higher Than Heaven)	
Billboard	The 30 Best Dance Songs of 2023	2023	Listed ("Miracle")	
Billboard	The 50 Best Dance Songs of 2024	2024	Listed ("Free")	
Billboard	The 50 Best Dance Songs of 2025	2025	11th ("Hypnotized")	
Billboard	Billboard's Top 100 Women Artists of the 21st Century	2025	62nd	
Billboard	Top Dance/Mix Show Airplay Songs of 2025	2025	12th ("Save My Love")	
Billboard	Top Hot Dance/Electronic Songs of 2025	2025	40th ("Hypnotized")	
Billboard	Top Hot Dance/Electronic Songs of 2025	2025	42nd ("Save My Love")	
Bustle	The 20 Best-Selling MAC Celeb Collaborations Of All Time	2017	16th	
Buzzfeed	15 Underrated Bonus Tracks That Snatched Harder Than The Actual Singles	2018	14th ("Two Years Ago")	
Buzzfeed	17 Best Underrated Songs of 2023	2023	4th ("Midnight Dreams")	
Consequence of Sound	Top 100 Best Songs of the 2010s	2019	86th ("Lights")	
Carved Culture	21 Of The Greatest And Most Famous British Female Singers	2023	15th	
Dancing Astronaut	Top 100 Songs of the Decade	2020	72nd ("Lights" Bassnectar Remix)	
Digital Spy	The 25 Best Albums of 2015	2015	7th (Delirium)	
EDM.com	15 EDM Songs That Hit You Right In The Feels	2018	3rd ("Lights" Bassnectar Remix)	
EDM.com	11 Dubstep Songs You Forgot How Much You Loved	2019	Listed ("Lights" Bassnectar Remix)	
EDM.com	The Best EDM Tracks of 2025: Dance-Pop	2025	Honorable Mention ("Save My Love")	
EDM House Network	Top 50 Best Dance Tracks of 2023	2023	3rd ("Miracle")	
Magnetic Mag	The 35 Best Vocalists in Electronic Dance Music	2023	Placed	
Magnetic Mag	The 35 Best Vocalists in Electronic Dance Music	2026	10th	
Mixmag	The Best Tracks of the Year 2023	2023	Listed ("Miracle")	
The New Zealand Herald	The Best Pop Music of 2015	2015	3rd (Delirium)	
Official Charts	The Official Top 40 Biggest Selling Artist Albums Of 2013	2014	10th (Halcyon)	
Official Charts	Most Streamed Albums of 2014	2015	7th (Halcyon)	
Official Charts	The Official Top 40 Biggest Selling Artist Albums Of 2014	2015	12th (Halcyon)	
Official Charts	The Official Top 40 Biggest Artist Albums of 2015	2016	34th (Delirium)	
Official Charts	The Official Top 40 Biggest Songs of 2015	2016	4th ("Love Me Like You Do")	
Official Charts	The Official Top 40 Biggest Albums of 2016	2016	39th (Delirium)	
Official Charts	British Female Solo Artists with the Most Number 1s Singles	2023	3rd (tied with Dua Lipa, Rita Ora and Geri Halliwell)	
Official Charts	British Female Solo Artists with Most Number 1s Albums	2023	1st (tied with Adele)	
Official Charts	Female Solo Artists with Most Number 1s Albums	2023	7th (tied with Adele)	
Official Charts	British Female Solo Artist with the Most Song Entries	2023	1st	
Official Charts	Songs of the Summer 2023	2023	2nd ("Miracle")	
Official Charts	The Top 100 Biggest Songs of the past 10 years	2024	82nd ("Love Me Like You Do")	
Official Charts	The Essential Songs from 10 years of Streaming	2024	Listed ("Love Me Like You Do")	
Pollstar	The Top 20 Biggest Music Tours in 2016: So Far (April)	2016	14th (Delirium World Tour)	
Pollstar	The Top 20 Biggest Music Tours in 2016: So Far (July)	2016	19th (Delirium World Tour)	
Pollstar	The Top 100 Worldwide Tours of 2016	2017	76th (Delirium World Tour)	
Pollstar	The Top 200 North American Tours of 2016	2017	112nd (Delirium World Tour)	
Popjustice	The Top 33 Albums of 2015	2015	4th (Delirium)	
Pop Passion	10 Best Pop Albums of 2023	2023	10th (Higher Than Heaven)	
Phonographic Performance Limited	The Most Played Female Artist of the 21st Century in the UK	2021	15th	
Rolling Stone	The 20 Best Pop Albums of 2015	2015	12th (Delirium)	
Rolling Stone	The 50 Most Inspirational LGBTQ+ Songs of All Time	2023	39th ("Anything Could Happen")	
Rolling Stone	The 100 Best Songs of 2023	2023	93rd ("Miracle")	
Rolling Stone	The Best Albums of 2023: So Far	2023	Listed (Higher Than Heaven)	
Rolling Stone	The 50 Best Max Martin Songs	2025	43rd ("On My Mind")	
Rolling Stone	The 50 Best Max Martin Songs	2025	26th ("Love Me Like You Do")	
Rolling Stone India	Top 100 Songs of 2023	2023	56th ("Somebody")	
Singersroom	The Top 20 Songs About Lights	2023	8th ("Lights")	
Singersroom	The 15 Best Electronic Music Songs of All Time	2024	2nd ("Lights" Bassnectar Remix)	
Spin	The 100 Greatest EDM Anthems of the ’10s	2015	93rd ("Lights" Bassnectar Remix)	
Spotify	Most Streamed Global Female Artists of 2015	2015	5th	
Spotify	Most Streamed Global Tracks of 2015	2015	5th ("Love Me Like You Do")	
Spotify	Most Streamed Females in the UK of 2015	2015	3rd	
The Hollywood Reporter	10 Global Pop Icons	2014	Placed	
The Music Essentials	The Top 10 Must-Hear Mainstage EDM Songs of 2023	2023	Listed ("Miracle" David Guetta Remix)	
The Young Folks	Top Albums of the 2010s: Individual Writers’ Lists	2019	12th (Lights)	
The Young Folks	Top Albums of the 2010s: Individual Writers’ Lists	2019	21st (Halcyon)	
Ticketmaster UK	The Best Songs Used in Christmas Adverts	2025	Listed ("Your Song")	
TIME	The Best New Songs of July 2020	2020	Listed ("Love I'm Given")	
Vice	The 101 Best EDM Songs of All Time	2017	68th ("Lights")	
Westword	The 6 Best Female Vocalists in EDM	2013	Placed	
We Rave You	The Top 100 Tracks of 2024	2024	Placed ("Free")	
1001Tracklist	Top 200 Tracks of 2023	2023	19th ("Miracle")	
1001Tracklist	Top 200 Tracks of 2023	2023	68th ("Miracle" Mau P Remix)	
1001Tracklist	Top 100 Dance Tracks of 2023	2023	5th ("Miracle")	
1001Tracklist	Top 100 Dance Tracks of 2023	2023	16th ("Miracle" Mau P Remix)	
1001Tracklist	Top 46 Drum & Bass Tracks of 2023	2023	18th ("Miracle" Wilkinson Remix)	
1001Tracklist	Top 100 Mainstage Tracks of 2023	2023	25th ("Miracle" Hardwell Remix)	
1001Tracklist	Top 10 Mashups of 2023	2023	7th ("Hold That Miracle Feeling Down")	
1001Tracklist	Longest Charting Tracks of 2023	2023	10th ("Miracle")	
1001Tracklist	Top 100 Dance Tracks of 2024	2024	61st ("Miracle")	
1001Tracklist	Top 200 Tracks of 2025	2025	14th ("Hypnotized")	
1001Tracklist	Top 200 Tracks of 2025	2025	129th ("Hypnotized" John Summit Remix)	
1001Tracklist	Top 100 Dance Tracks of 2025	2025	2nd ("Hypnotized")	
1001Tracklist	Top 100 Melodic House & Techno Tracks of 2025	2025	31st ("Hypnotized" John Summit Remix)	
1001Tracklist	Longest Charting Tracks of 2025	2025	15th ("Hypnotized")	
