= Delirium World Tour =

2016–17 concert tour by Ellie Goulding

- Tour by Ellie Goulding
- Associated album: Delirium
- Start date: 21 January 2016
- End date: 26 August 2017
- Legs: 5
- No. of shows: 42 in North America; 40 in Europe; 5 in Oceania; 1 in Africa; 88 total
- Box office: $7.12 million

Ellie Goulding concert chronology
- The Halcyon Days Tour (2012–2014); Delirium World Tour (2016-2017); Brightest Blue Tour (2021)

The Delirium World Tour was the third headlining concert tour by the English singer and songwriter Ellie Goulding to promote her third studio album, Delirium (2015). The tour consists of four legs, European, North American, summer festivals and Oceanic. Including 89 dates across 88 cities, the tour commenced on 21 January 2016 at Barclaycard Arena in Hamburg, Germany, and concluded on 26 August 2017 at SummerDays Festival in Arbon, Switzerland.

== Opening acts ==
- John Newman (United Kingdom)
- Sara Hartman (Europe)
- Years & Years (Most of North America dates and Australia)
- The Knocks (Selected North America dates)
- Broods (Selected North America dates)
- Cedric Gervais (Selected North America dates)
- Bebe Rexha (Selected North America dates)
- Matt and Kim (Selected North America dates)
- Asta (Australia)
- Openside (New Zealand)
- LANY (United Kingdom)

== Setlists ==
Europe and United Kingdom
1. "Intro (Delirium)"
2. "Aftertaste"
3. "Holding on for Life"
4. "Goodness Gracious"
5. "We Can't Move to This"
6. "Outside"
7. "Devotion" (Acoustic)
8. "I Do What I Love" (Interlude)(contains sample of "Only You")
9. "Keep on Dancin'"
10. "Don't Need Nobody "
11. "Heal" (Interlude)
12. "Explosions"
13. "Army"
14. "Lights" (Acoustic – European dates only)
15. "Lost and Found" (Acoustic)
16. "Lost & Found / Figure 8" (Interlude)
17. "Figure 8"
18. "On My Mind"
19. "Codes"
20. "Don't Panic"
21. "Something in the Way You Move"
22. "I Need Your Love"
23. "Burn"

Encore:

20. "Anything Could Happen"
21. "Love Me like You Do"
North America
1. "Intro (Delirium)"
2. "Aftertaste"
3. "Holding on for Life
4. "Goodness Gracious"
5. "Something in the Way You Move"
6. "Outside"
7. "Devotion" (Acoustic)
8. "I Do What I Love" (Video)(contains sample of "Only You")
9. "Keep on Dancin"
10. "Don't Need Nobody"
11. "Heal" (Video)
12. "Explosions"
13. "When Doves Cry" (Prince cover; selected dates)
14. "Lights" (Acoustic)
15. "Army"
16. "Lost & Found" (Acoustic)
17. "Lost & Found / Figure 8" (Interlude)
18. "Figure 8"
19. "On My Mind"
20. "Codes"
21. "We Can't Move To This"
22. "I Need Your Love"
23. "Burn"

Encore:

24. "Anything Could Happen"
25. "Love Me like You Do"
Radio 1's Big Weekend
1. "Intro (Delirium)"
2. "On My Mind"
3. "Army"
4. "Anything Could Happen"
5. "Outside"
6. "Burn"
7. "Love Me like You Do"
Glastonbury Festival
1. "Intro (Delirium)"
2. "Aftertaste"
3. "Outside"
4. "Burn"
5. "Devotion" (Acoustic)
6. "Keep on Dancin"
7. "Don't Need Nobody"
8. "Figure 8"
9. "On My Mind"
10. "I Need Your Love"
11. "Anything Could Happen"
12. "Love Me like You Do"
EXIT, Belsonic, and Rock Werchter Festival's
1. "Intro (Delirium)"
2. "Aftertaste"
3. "Holding on for Life"
4. "Goodness Gracious"
5. "Something in the Way You Move" (Not performed at Belsonic)
6. "Outside"
7. "Devotion" (Acoustic)
8. "I Do What I Love" (Video)(contains sample of "Only You")
9. "Keep on Dancin"
10. "Don't Need Nobody"
11. "Lights"
12. "Army"
13. "Figure 8"
14. "On My Mind"
15. "Codes"
16. "Don't Panic"
17. "I Need Your Love"
18. "Burn"
19. "Anything Could Happen"
20. "Love Me like You Do"
Main Square Festival
1. "Intro (Delirium)"
2. "Aftertaste"
3. "Holding on for Life"
4. "Goodness Gracious"
5. "Something in the Way You Move"
6. "Outside"
7. "Burn"
8. "Lights"
9. "Army"
10. "On My Mind"
11. "Anything Could Happen"
12. "I Need Your Love"
13. "Love Me like You Do"
Oceania
1. "Intro (Delirium)"
2. "Aftertaste"
3. "Holding on for Life"
4. "Something in the Way You Move"
5. "Outside"
6. "You My Everything"
7. "Devotion" (Acoustic)
8. "I Do What I Love" (Video Interlude)
10. "Keep on Dancin'"
11. "Don't Need Nobody"
12. "Heal" (Dance Interlude)
13. "Explosions"
14. "Still Falling for You"
15. "Army"
16. "Lost and Found" (Acoustic)
17. "Lost and Found / Figure 8 (Video Interlude)
18. "Figure 8"
19. "On My Mind"
20. "Codes"
21. "Don't Panic"
22. "Animal"
23. "I Need Your Love"
24. "Burn

Encore:

25. "Anything Could Happen"
26. "Love Me like You Do"

== Shows ==
List of concerts, showing date, city, country, venue, opening acts, tickets sold, number of available tickets and amount of gross revenue
Date
Europe
21 January 2016	Hamburg	Germany	Barclaycard Arena	5,264 / 7,366 (71%)	$222,963
22 January 2016	Berlin	Germany	Max-Schmeling-Halle	7,656 / 7,656 (100%)	—
23 January 2016	Warsaw	Poland	Torwar Hall	6,965 / 9,965 (100%)	—
25 January 2016	Frankfurt	Germany	Jahrhunderthalle	4,800 / 4,800 (100%)	—
26 January 2016	Amsterdam	Netherlands	Ziggo Dome	14,332 / 14,332 (100%)	—
27 January 2016	Stuttgart	Germany	Porsche-Arena	7,659 / 7,659 (100%)	—
29 January 2016	Vienna	Austria	Wiener Stadthalle	9,650 / 9,650 (100%)	—
30 January 2016	Prague	Czech Republic	O_{2} Arena Prague	11,039 / 11,039 (100%)	—
1 February 2016	Milan	Italy	Mediolanum Forum	10,508 / 10,508 (100%)	—
2 February 2016	Munich	Germany	Olympiahalle	11,319 / 11,508 (98%)	—
5 February 2016	Barcelona	Spain	Palau Sant Jordi	10,549 / 10,852 (97%)	—
6 February 2016	Madrid	Spain	Palacio Vistalegre	11,319 / 11,654 (97%)	—
9 February 2016	Antwerp	Belgium	Sportpaleis	19,699 / 20,151 (98%)	$812,320
25 February 2016	Paris	France	Zénith Paris	6,293 / 6,293 (100%)	—
26 February 2016	Oberhausen	Germany	König Pilsener Arena	10,569 / 10,569 (100%)	—
28 February 2016	Zürich	Switzerland	Hallenstadion	9,509 / 11,450 (83%)	$529,564
29 February 2016	Esch-sur-Alzette	Luxembourg	Rockhal	6,500 / 6,500 (100%)	—
3 March 2016	Stockholm	Sweden	Ericsson Globe	4,900 / 13,649 (36%)	—
4 March 2016	Oslo	Norway	Telenor Arena	15,646 / 15,646 (100%)	—
5 March 2016	Copenhagen	Denmark	Forum Copenhagen	10,000 / 10,000 (100%)	—
8 March 2016	Cardiff	Wales	Motorpoint Arena Cardiff	7,500 / 7,500 (100%)	—
10 March 2016	Liverpool	England	Echo Arena Liverpool	11,008 / 11,008 (100%)	—
12 March 2016	Sheffield	England	Sheffield Arena	10,508 / 10,508 (100%)	—
13 March 2016	Nottingham	England	Motorpoint Arena Nottingham	9,698 / 9,780 (99%)	—
15 March 2016	Leeds	England	First Direct Arena	13,215 / 13,215 (100%)	—
16 March 2016	Newcastle	England	Metro Radio Arena	9,698 / 9,698 (100%)	—
18 March 2016	Glasgow	Scotland	The SSE Hydro	12,057 / 12,277 (98%)	$607,436
19 March 2016	Manchester	England	Manchester Arena	13,748 / 15,377 (89%)	$696,287
21 March 2016	Birmingham	England	Barclaycard Arena Birmingham	10,875 / 10,875 (100%)	—
24 March 2016	London	England	The O_{2} Arena	28,654 / 30,594 (94%)	$1,474,630
25 March 2016	London	England	The O_{2} Arena	28,654 / 30,594 (94%)	$1,474,630
North America
1 April 2016	Vancouver	Canada	Rogers Arena	8,769 / 11,508 (76%)	—
2 April 2016	Seattle	United States	KeyArena	9,131 / 11,516 (79%)	—
3 April 2016	Portland	United States	Theater of the Clouds	5,445 / 7,112 (77%)	—
5 April 2016	Sacramento	United States	Sacramento Memorial Auditorium	3,489 / 3,489 (100%)	—
6 April 2016	San Jose	United States	SAP Center	8,257 / 11,918 (69%)	—
8 April 2016	Los Angeles	United States	Staples Center	11,304 / 11,304 (100%)	$605,350
9 April 2016	Las Vegas	United States	Mandalay Bay Events Center	7,998 / 7,998 (100%)	—
12 April 2016	Broomfield	United States	1stBank Center	5,606 / 6,950 (81%)	—
13 April 2016	West Valley City	United States	Maverik Center	5,421 / 10,441 (52%)	$324,971
15 April 2016 (Note: The concert on April 15, 2016 in Indio, United States at the Empire Polo Club was a part of the Coachella Valley Music and Arts Festival.)	Indio	United States	Empire Polo Club	—N/a	—N/a
16 April 2016	Phoenix	United States	Comerica Theatre	4,215 / 5,000 (84%)	—
18 April 2016	Grand Prairie	United States	Verizon Theatre	6,355 / 6,355 (100%)	—
19 April 2016	Cedar Park	United States	Cedar Park Center	5,296 / 5,858 (90%)	$244,788
22 April 2016 (Note: The concert on April 22, 2016 in Indio, United States at the Empire Polo Club was a part of the Coachella Valley Music and Arts Festival.)	Indio	United States	Empire Polo Club	—N/a	—N/a
23 April 2016	San Diego	United States	Viejas Arena	5,187 / 8,330 (62%)	—
5 May 2016	Saint Paul	United States	Xcel Energy Center	5,679 / 7,200 (79%)	—
6 May 2016	Rosemont	United States	Allstate Arena	8,051 / 10,000 (81%)	$439,765
7 May 2016	Cleveland	United States	Jacobs Pavilion	3,051 / 5,000 (61%)	—
9 May 2016	Ypsilanti	United States	EMU Convocation Center	6,392 / 9,002 (71%)	—
10 May 2016 (Note: The concert on May 10, 2017 in Columbus, Ohio Years and Years were not able to perform.)	Columbus	United States	Lifestyle Communities Pavilion	4,338 / 5,000 (87%)	---
11 May 2016	Bethlehem	United States	Sands Bethlehem Event Center	2,142 / 2,142 (100%)	—
13 May 2016	Pittsburgh	United States	Stage AE	5,200 / 5,200 (100%)	$205,400
14 May 2016	Indianapolis	United States	Farm Bureau Insurance Lawn	4,872 / 6,000 (81%)	—
16 May 2016	St. Louis	United States	Chaifetz Arena	6,141 / 7,300 (84%)	—
17 May 2016	Bonner Springs	United States	Providence Medical Center Amphitheater	5,662 / 7,500 (75%)	—
18 May 2016	Oklahoma City	United States	Zoo Amphitheatre	4,308 / 6,000 (72%)	—
20 May 2016	Rogers	United States	Walmart Arkansas Music Pavilion	4,000 / 4,000 (100%)	—
21 May 2016	Houston	United States	Toyota Center	6,675 / 12,531 (53%)	—
Europe
29 May 2016 (Note: The concert on May 29, 2016 in Exeter, England at Powderham Castle was a part of BBC Radio 1's Big Weekend.)	Exeter	England	Powderham Castle	—N/a	—N/a
North America
2 June 2016	Tampa	United States	Amalie Arena	6,004 / 9,758 (62%)	$216,810
3 June 2016	Miami	United States	American Airlines Arena	7,891 / 11,053 (71%)	—
4 June 2016	Orlando	United States	CFE Arena	6,308 / 7,660 (82%)	—
6 June 2016	Alpharetta	United States	Verizon Wireless Amphitheatre at Encore Park	5,667 / 7,000 (81%)	—
7 June 2016	Charleston	United States	Volvo Cars Stadium	4,641 / 5,596 (83%)	$192,697
9 June 2016	Charlotte	United States	Charlotte Metro Credit Union Amphitheatre	3,556 / 5,022 (71%)	—
10 June 2016	Raleigh	United States	Red Hat Amphitheater	4,288 / 6,210 (69%)	—
13 June 2016	Columbia	United States	Merriweather Post Pavilion	4,338 / 5,100 (85%)	—
14 June 2016	Hopewell	United States	Marvin Sands Performing Arts Center	2,756 / 3,585 (77%)	—
15 June 2016	Boston	United States	TD Garden	10,537 / 12,502 (84%)	—
18 June 2016	Montreal	Canada	Bell Centre	6,494 / 7,379 (88%)	$280,274
19 June 2016	Toronto	Canada	Air Canada Centre	10,478 / 10,500 (99%)	$451,600
21 June 2016	New York City	United States	Madison Square Garden	12,998 / 12,998 (100%)	—
Europe
26 June 2016 (Note: The concert on June 26, 2016 in Pilton, England at Worthy Farm was a part of Glastonbury Festival.)	Pilton	England	Worthy Farm	—N/a	—N/a
28 June 2016 (Note: The concert on June 28, 2016 in Belfast, Northern Ireland at Custom House Square was a part of Belsonic.)	Belfast	Northern Ireland	Custom House Square	—N/a	—N/a
30 June 2016 (Note: The concert on June 30, 2016 in Werchter, Belgium at Festival Park was a part of Rock Werchter.)	Werchter	Belgium	Festival Park	—N/a	—N/a
1 July 2016 (Note: The concert on July 1, 2016 in Arras, France at Citadelle d'Arras was a part of Main Square Festival.)	Arras	France	Citadelle d'Arras	—N/a	—N/a
7 July 2016 (Note: The concert on July 7, 2016 in Novi Sad, Serbia at Petrovaradin Fortress was a part of Exit Festival.)	Novi Sad	Serbia	Exit Festival	—N/a	—N/a
North America
31 July 2016 (Note: The concert on July 31, 2016 in Chicago, United States at Grant Park was a part of Lollapalooza.)	Chicago	United States	Grant Park	—N/a	—N/a
Oceania
29 September 2016	Christchurch	New Zealand	Horncastle Arena	—	—
1 October 2016	Auckland	New Zealand	Vector Arena	—	—
5 October 2016	Brisbane	Australia	Riverstage	—	—
7 October 2016	Sydney	Australia	Qudos Bank Arena	—	—
8 October 2016	Melbourne	Australia	Rod Laver Arena	—	—
Africa
12 May 2017 (Note: The concert on May 12, 2017 in Rabat, Morocco at OLM Souissi was a part of Mawazine.)	Rabat	Morocco	OLM Souissi	—N/a	—N/a
Europe
14 June 2017 (Note: The concert on June 14, 2017 in Bergen, Norway at Bergenhus Fortress was a part of Bergenfest.)	Bergen	Norway	Bergenhus Fortress	—N/a	—N/a
27 June 2017 (Note: The concert on June 27, 2017 in Sopron, Hungary at Kőszegi út 35 was a part of VOLT Festival.)	Sopron	Hungary	Kőszegi út 35	—N/a	—N/a
29 June 2017 (Note: The concert on June 29, 2017 in Seinajoki, Finland at Törnävänsaari was a part of Provinssirock.)	Seinajoki	Finland	Törnävänsaari	—N/a	—N/a
1 July 2017 (Note: The concert on July 1, 2017 in Norrköping, Sweden at F 13 Norrköping was a part of Bråvalla Festival.)	Norrköping	Sweden	F 13 Norrköping	—N/a	—N/a
14 July 2017 (Note: The concert on July 14, 2017 in Salacgrīva, Latvia at Zvejnieku Parks was a part of Positivus Festival.)	Salacgrīva	Latvia	Zvejnieku Parks	—N/a	—N/a
22 July 2017	Moscow	Russia	Lastochka Festival	—N/a	—N/a
4 August 2017	Cluj-Napoca	Romania	Untold Festival	—N/a	—N/a
5 August 2017	Rumsiskes	Lithuania	Granatos Live	—N/a	—N/a
11 August 2017	Skanderborg	Denmark	Smukfest	—N/a	—N/a
18 August 2017 (Note: The concert on August 18, 2017 in Kraków, Poland at the Polish Aviation Museum was a part of Live Music Festival.)	Kraków	Poland	Polish Aviation Museum	—N/a	—N/a
19 August 2017	Shifnal	England	Weston Park	—N/a	—N/a
26 August 2017	Arbon	Switzerland	SummerDays Festival	—N/a	—N/a
Total				560,077 / 627,594 (89.2%)	$7,112,188

== Cancelled shows ==
Date	City	Country	Venue	Reason for cancellation
15 July 2016	Salacgriva	Latvia	Riga Bay	Health problems
16 July 2016	Joensuu	Finland	Laulurinne	Health problems
10 October 2016	Adelaide	Australia	Adelaide Entertainment Centre	Scheduling conflict
12 October 2016	Perth	Australia	Perth Arena	Scheduling conflict

== Tour credits ==
Name	Credit	Name	Credit	Name	Credit
Ellie Goulding	Artist	Tim Bolland	LED Technician/Camera Operator	Darren Mowforth	Crew Bus Driver
Joe Clegg	MD/Drums	Ray Gwilliams	Video Engineer	Chris Moulson	Crew Bus Driver
Chris Ketley	Guitars/Keys	Phil Leech	LED Technician/Camera Operator	Tom Herraty	Merchandise Manager
Simon Francis	Bass/Keys	Ant Barrett	Video Crew	Black Skull Creative	Show Design
Kola Bello	Keys	Mike Shepard	Lighting Crew Chief	Bryte Design	Show Design
Abbie Osmon	Backing vocals	Mark Goodall	Lighting Tech/SR Dimmers/Networking	Lianne Lee May	Assistant Choreographer
Melissa Erpen	Backing vocals	Glenn Johnson	Lighting Tech/SL Dimmers	Carl Robertshaw	Fabric Design
Sarah-Jane Skeete	Backing vocals	Neil Smith	Lighting Tech	Lite Alternate	Lighting
Ross Sands	Dancer	Paul Burke	Lighting Tech	XL Video	Video
Jackson Williams	Dancer	Chris Wilkes	Lighting Tech	Pyro Junkies	Special Effects
Remi Black	Dancer	Amos Cotter	Head Rigger	Showtex	Fabric Effects
Jordan Melchor	Dancer	Chris Karritt	Rigger	Adlib Audio	Audio
Rebecca Travis	Tour Manager	Mark Peers	Audio Crew Chief	Rock It Cargo	Freight
Hannah Lowe	Personal Assistant to Ellie Goulding	George Puttock	Audio Tech	Rima Travel	Travel
Lucy Wearing	Make Up Artist	Simon Lawson	Audio Tech	Popcorn Catering	Catering
Louis Byrne	Hair Stylist	Lee Fox-Furnell	Audio Tech	Phoenix Bussing	Bussing
Jamie Lillywhite	Management	Stephen Russell	Guitar Tech	Fly By Nite	Trucking
Cassandra Gracey	Management	Martin Gavrilovic	Drum Tech	All Access Staging	Staging
Alan Jewell	Management	Will Sanderson	MIDI/Keys Tech	Publicity & Display	Passes
Ray Whelan	Stage Manager	Matt Randall	Backline Tech	Harris & Trotter	Accountant
Bob O'Brien	Production Manager	Steffy Head	Caterer	CODA	Agent
Kim Gray	Production Coordinator	Chris Clarke	Chef	William Morris Ent.	Agent
Alex Wiseman	Production Assistant	Anis Darragi	Chef	Executours	Cars
Richard Walker	Security	James Maggorie	Chef	The Araca Group	Merchandise
Robin Haddow	Video Director	Eddie McQueen	Caterer	Nike	Tour Costumes
Cate Carter	Lighting Director	Josh Perree	Carpenter	M.A.C Cosmetics	Tour Make Up
Joe Harling	FOH Engineer	Nidge Dobson	Carpenter	Dr Martens	Tour Costumes
Mike Flaherty	Monitor Engineer	Bernie King	Lead Truck Driver		
Ameena Kara Callender	Costume Designer/Stylist	Paul Edwards	Truck Driver		
Maureen Thompson	Wardrobe	John Burgess	Truck Driver		
Paul Stratford	Head Carpenter	Chris Overton	Truck Driver		
Guy Anderson	Ellie's Driver	Andy Heath	Truck Driver		
David Roemer	Photographer	Tony Johnson	Truck Driver		
Conor McDonell	Photographer	Graham Trull	Truck Driver		
Dan Shipton	Show Director & Co-Designer	Richard Enemey	Truck Driver		
Cate Carter	Co-Designer	Graham Brumhead	Ellie Goulding Bus Driver		
Ross Nicholson	Producer	Megan Griffith	Band Bus Driver		
Jay Revell	Choreographer	Mike Birch	Crew Bus Driver	Mary Mattern	Chef
