= National Centre for Domestic Violence =

Organisation for domestic abuse victims

- Abbreviation: NCDV
- Formation: 2002; 24 years ago
- Registration no.: Companies House Company No. 11159687
- Headquarters: Guildford, Surrey, England, UK
- Region served: England, Wales
- Fields: Domestic violence
- Website: www.ncdv.org.uk

The National Centre for Domestic Violence (NCDV), formerly the London Centre for Domestic Violence, is a not-for-profit organisation that provides urgent help for victims of domestic abuse and violence in England and Wales, headquartered in Surrey and organised as a community interest company. Their services are referred to by several organisations and local governments across the country.

The NCDV was founded in 2002 and offers a free injunction service which helps survivors of domestic abuse and violence obtain non-molestation orders. According to the NCDV, police and victims previously had to look to the services of solicitors to receive such orders, and most solicitors would only offer their services to clients who were eligible for public funding or willing to pay themselves. They also offer pro bono legal services.

According to their year-end report, the NCDV had received more than 300,000 phone calls and 89,000 referrals in the year of 2025, of which around 60% came from police forces. That year they had provided pro bono legal help to over 4,400 cases, and trained over 15,000 police staff and professionals.

== History ==
The NCDV was founded in 2002 by barrister Steve Connor as the London Centre for Domestic Violence. It became a registered charity in 2006 under its new name as the National Centre for Domestic Violence. It was reorganised as a private company in 2011, and became a community interest company in 2020.

The Community trade union partnered with the NCDV in 2025 to ensure access to resources, guidance and training for combating domestic abuse.

== Advertising campaigns ==
In 2010 the advertising agency J. Walter Thompson created a poster for the NCDV of a man without genitalia. The campaign raised awareness of domestic violence against men, highlighting that one man dies every three weeks as a result of domestic violence.

In April 2012, the NCDV launched an interactive billboard campaign titled "Drag Him Away" at Euston railway station, centred on a domestic abuse situation between a man and a woman. Viewers were directed to go to a website or scan a QR code to drag the man away onto adjacent billboards, and informed viewers of the distance which injunctions help create between a victim and their abuser.

In 2016 the NCDV and Victim Support launched the online advert "Break the Routine", choreographed by Sidi Cherkaoui and set to music by Ellie Goulding, which highlighted that high-risk victims live under domestic abuse for two years on average before receiving specialist support. At the 2017 ceremony of the Cannes Lions International Festival of Creativity, Goulding, alongside collaborators Chris Ketley and Joe Kearns, won the Silver Lion in the Entertainment Music category for their original composition used in the advert.

In 2018 J. Walter Thompson created the "Not-So-Beautiful Game" series of posters, which transformed the national flags of teams in the 2018 FIFA World Cup into domestic violence scenes and directed victims to contact the NCDV. The campaign's subtitle read "Domestic violence increases 26% when England play. 38% if they lose", referring to a 2014 study published by Lancaster University. (Note: The study was limited to reports made to Lancashire Constabulary.) One of the posters, featuring a woman's face with blood pouring from her nose to form Saint George's Cross, was singled out by The Independent. The campaign was awarded the Gold Lion in the "Entertainment Lions for Sport" category at the 2019 ceremony of the Cannes Lions.

In 2020 the advertising agency Wunderman Thompson worked with the NCDV on a pro bono basis on a campaign titled "Abusers Always Work From Home", in which a video call is intercut with an escalating domestic violence situation, set on the backdrop of the COVID-19 pandemic with a voice-over from Vicky McClure. In 2021 the same agency worked with the NCDV to create a series of billboards which highlighted common excuses given by victims which disguise domestic violence.

During the UEFA Euro 2024 championship, the NCDV and the charity Solace Women's Aid were part of a campaign highlighting rises in domestic abuse during championship football games, introducing an alternative football kit emblazoned with the slogan "No More Injury Time", publicised in cooperation with abuse survivor and former Miss England Rehema Muthamia, influencer Flo Finch and actress Karen Bryson.

== Criticism ==
A 2017 investigation by BuzzFeed News found that the NCDV receives payments for referring domestic abuse victims to solicitors, and had failed to disclose this on their website. In one case this was found to be in contravention of legal codes of conduct. At least 19 other cases involving the NCDV had been referred to the Solicitors Regulation Authority. BuzzFeed News reported that some victims had been turned away after being found ineligible for legal aid, while others found the NCDV's injunction service unresponsive or prone to delays during critical periods. They also found that the NCDV had misrepresented supporters as "patrons" on their website after becoming a private company in 2011. BuzzFeed News reported seeing documentation stating that the NCDV sees around 10,000 cases a year, estimating a potential annual income of more than £5 million. The Labour Party's shadow minister for policing, Louise Haigh, called for an investigation into the NCDV after these reports. The same year, the NCDV no longer charged solicitors when providing documentation.

The NCDV reorganised itself into a community interest company (CIC) in August 2020. They accept donations for their pro bono legal support programme, but their status as a CIC forbids them from functioning as a charity.

In 2024 the NCDV apologised after it had accidentally given a domestic abuse victim's address to her abuser.
