= Delirium (Ellie Goulding album) =

2015 studio album by Ellie Goulding

- Physical standard edition artwork (Note: Deluxe pressings feature a golden typeface colour. Both digital versions (standard and deluxe) use a different typeface.)

Studio album by Ellie Goulding
- Released: 6 November 2015
- Studios: British Grove; Abbey Road; RAK; SMV; Metropolis; Sarm Music Village; Musicbox; Fly Eye (London); Echo; Westlake; MXM; Little Kingdom (Los Angeles); Wolf Cousins; MXM; P.S.; Kinglet; Apmamman (Stockholm); The RedRoom (Gothenburg); Studio at the Palms (Las Vegas); Splendido (Hereford); Golden Age (Auckland)
- Genres: Pop; electropop
- Length: 56:31
- Label: Polydor
- Producers: Klas Åhlund; Carl Falk; Fred; Calvin Harris; Joe Kearns; Chris Ketley; Greg Kurstin; Guy Lawrence; Joel Little; Major Lazer; Max Martin; Jimmy Napes; Ali Payami; Picard Brothers; Laleh Pourkarim; Ilya Salmanzadeh; The Struts; Peter Svensson; Ryan Tedder; Noel Zancanella

Ellie Goulding chronology
Halcyon Days: The Remixes (2014)	Delirium (2015)	Brightest Blue (2020)

Singles from Delirium
- 1. "On My Mind" Released: 17 September 2015; 2. "Army" Released: 15 January 2016; 3. "Something in the Way You Move" Released: 19 January 2016

Delirium is the third studio album by English singer-songwriter Ellie Goulding. It was released on 6 November 2015 by Polydor Records. The album was produced by a range of collaborators including Max Martin and Greg Kurstin. Delirium marked a shift towards a more mainstream pop sound for Goulding, incorporating elements of electropop, synth-pop, dance, house, and R&B. She described it as a turning point in her career and sought to create "bigger songs" while drawing on the more positive period of her life at the time.

Three singles supported Delirium—"On My Mind", "Army", and "Something in the Way You Move"—as well as the promotional single "Lost and Found". The album also features "Love Me like You Do" from the Fifty Shades of Grey soundtrack, which was a worldwide commercial success. Collaborations with Calvin Harris and Major Lazer appear on the deluxe editions. To promote the album, Goulding embarked on the Delirium World Tour, performing across Europe and North America, including in various music festivals.

Critical reception was generally favourable; some reviewers praised Goulding's vocal range and the album's polished production and pop-oriented sound, while others criticised its songwriting and likened its sound to pop trends. The record topped the albums chart in the Belgian region of Flanders and reached the top five in Australia, Austria, Canada, Germany, Ireland, New Zealand, Scotland, Switzerland, the United Kingdom, and the United States. Delirium also received multi-platinum certifications in multiple territories.

== Background and development ==
After the release of her second studio album, Halcyon (2012), Ellie Goulding sought to expand her audience and establish herself more firmly as a pop artist. Halcyon's modest commercial performance, particularly in the United States, contributed to her decision to pursue a more contemporary pop sound on her third studio album, Delirium. On this album, Goulding worked with various producers including Max Martin and Greg Kurstin.

Goulding indicated that Delirium's title had been associated with the project as early as April 2013, when she posted the word on Twitter more than two years before the album's release. Goulding also said that her mood and happiness shifted following the success of her 2013 single "Burn"; she ultimately saw Delirium as an exploration of happiness and the creation of "bigger songs", calling it a "go hard or go home" moment in her career. Goulding felt that Delirium encapsulated everything she had been through up to that point, saying that it reflects contrasting emotions, as it could describe either "a really happy, crazy state" or its "complete opposite", as she often found herself "in a state of delirium".

Delirium was recorded and produced in various locations such as London, Herefordshire, Los Angeles, Stockholm, Gothenburg, and Auckland. While in Los Angeles, Goulding found herself mingling with people she greatly admired, describing her time in the city as "clean and stress-free" and attributing the upbeat sound of Delirium in part to her positive experiences there. She contrasted its sound with Halcyon's darker mood, which she wrote during an intense depressive period.

== Composition ==
=== Influence ===
There's always that soul of me and I'll always work with different people. I work with the same people, but the sound will always be a little bit pushed. I push pop music and I think that's what I've done. And even if people say it's "just a pop record", it's not just a pop record! I feel like I'm pushing it, and I feel like that should be an admirable thing, not something to be frowned upon.

— Goulding, in an interview with Vice

Goulding attributed the distinctiveness of her sound to her voice and her upbringing around electronic music, citing her mother's interest in rave music as an early influence. She described the sound of Delirium as more pop-oriented than her previous releases, stating: "a part of me views this album as an experiment, to make a big pop album; I made a conscious decision that I wanted it to be on another level." Goulding depicted Delirium as a more collaborative project that represented her identity as a pop artist, while incorporating her classical, folk, and particularly electronic influences. She shaped the album with live performance in mind and chose co-writers to exchange lyrical ideas, as opposed to Halcyon where she brainstormed the lyrics mainly by herself.

Nylon's Hayden Manders argued that the involvement of high-profile producers did not obscure her personality but instead amplified it across dance-oriented songs. He viewed Goulding's approach to pop as an expansion of the sound associated with her previous electronic collaborations, describing Delirium as making pop feel comparable to the EDM acts she had previously worked with.

=== Production and vocals ===
A pop and electropop album, Delirium replaces the orchestral and indie-electro elements that were prominent on Halcyon with production typical of pure pop; Delirium features elements of synth-pop, electronic, dance, and R&B, with influences from 1980s-style pop.

In Delirium, Goulding's voice spans three and a half octaves. During the sessions, Martin encouraged her to experiment with vocal techniques she had not previously explored, including singing in a lower register. Goulding consequently switches between higher and lower registers throughout the album. This lower register is prominent on tracks like "Love Me like You Do". Much of the vocals in Delirium are also double-tracked.

=== Songs ===
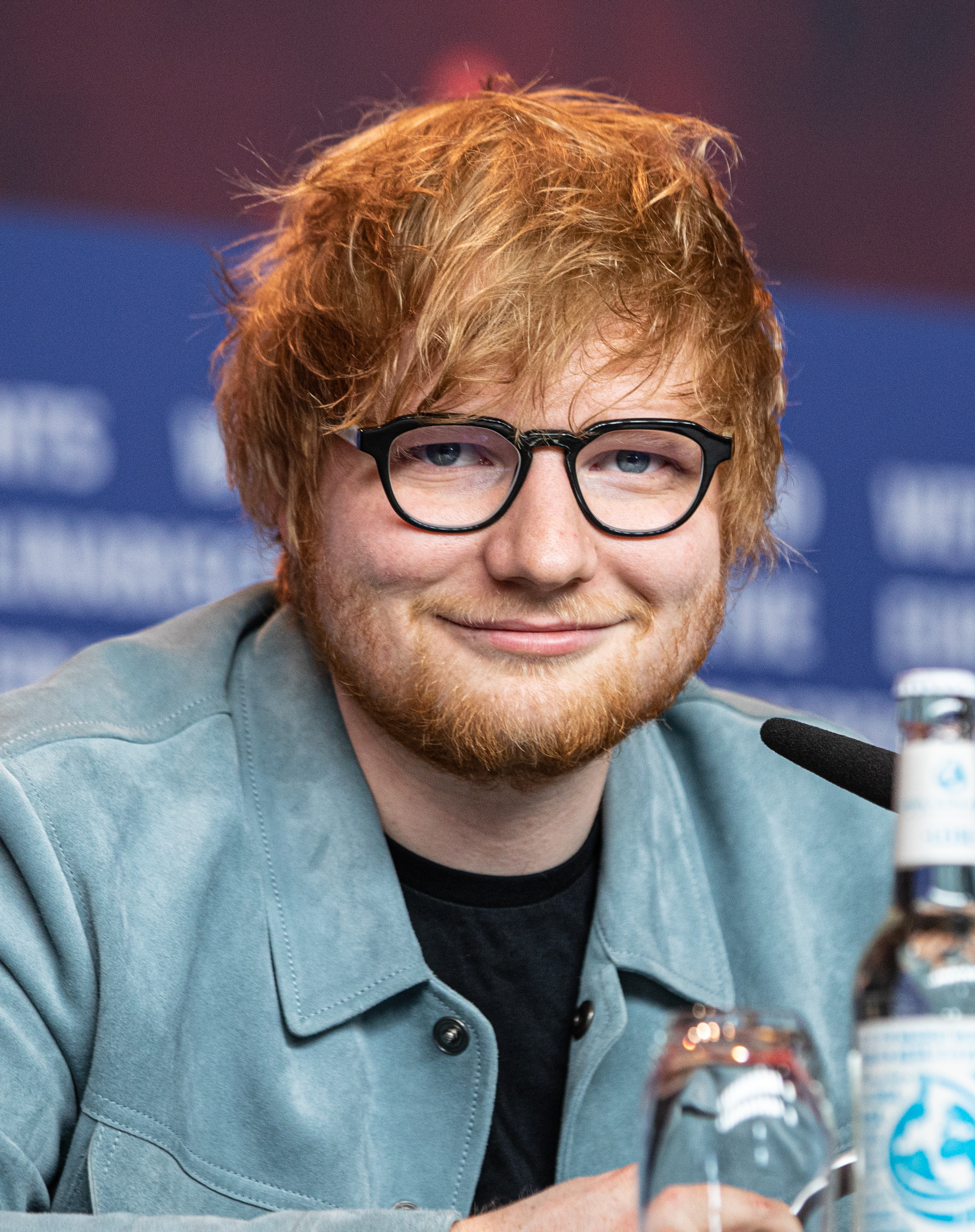
"On My Mind" was widely speculated to be a response to "Don't" (2014) by Ed Sheeran (pictured), a connection Goulding later dismissed.

Delirium opens with "Intro (Delirium)", on which Goulding sings in her upper register before transitioning into lower-pitched, melismatic vocals over a synth-based and string-layered arrangement. The next track is "Aftertaste", a song that features a disco-influenced rhythm. The album continues with "Something in the Way You Move", which has lyrics centred on heartbreak and a production that consists of a steady beat and delicate piano. A tropical-influenced song, "Keep On Dancin'" incorporates whistling sounds. "On My Mind" is an electropop and R&B track that blends electronic elements with brisk guitar riffs and rhythmic vocal phrasing. The lyrics, which address a past relationship, have been interpreted as a possible response to Ed Sheeran's 2014 single "Don't"; Goulding stated that it was not written about any specific person, saying that anybody could interpret it however they want. The next track, "Around U", is a synth-pop and doo-wop track, with critics comparing it to the music of Grimes and CeeLo. "Codes" addresses relationship struggles and has a shimmering electro-pop arrangement; "Holding On for Life" is a disco-inflected power ballad with a two-step rhythm and gospel sounds.

"Don't Need Nobody" incorporates house influences and features elements of 1990s house, electro-pop, and trap. In "Don't Panic", Goulding describes repeatedly breaking hearts without reflecting on whether the behaviour is right or wrong, while the techno and house-reminiscent "We Can't Move to This" features candid lyrics centred on romantic relationships. An EDM song, "Army" is dedicated to Goulding's best friend, celebrating their bond and mutual support. Goulding described it as "honest, real, [and] electric" and explained that it reflects how their friendship gives her strength and confidence. "Lost and Found" has a pop-oriented sound, drawing critics' comparisons to the music of Of Monsters and Men or Lorde. "Devotion" features UK garage elements, and the final track of the standard edition, "Scream It Out", was inspired by a period in which Goulding learned to be more open with expressing her emotional struggles.

== Promotion ==
=== Marketing and packaging ===
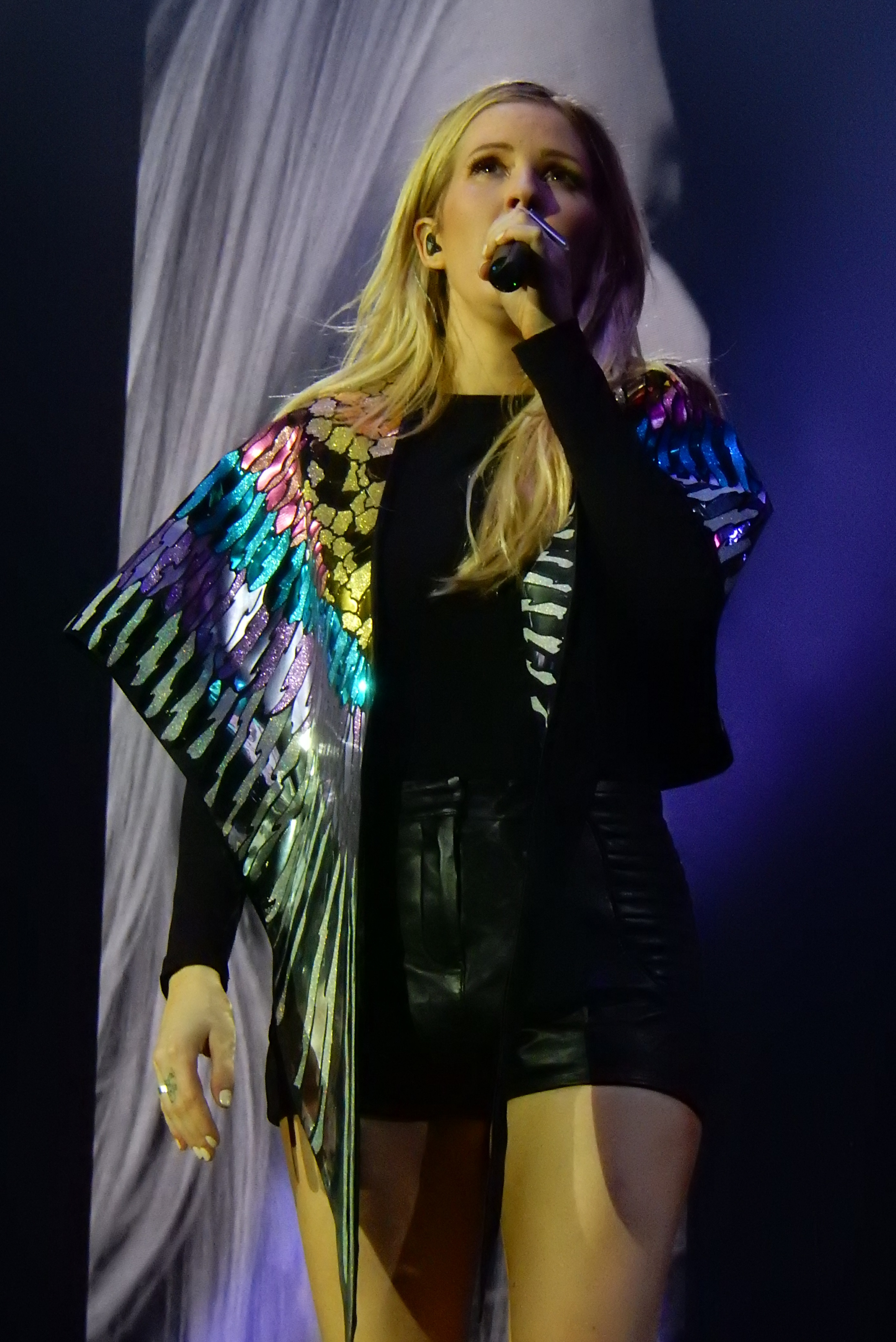
Goulding performing at the O2 Arena in London in March 2016

During the week before Delirium's release, multiple radio stations premiered different tracks from the album. "Don't Panic" premiered on Graham Norton's BBC Radio 2 show on 31 October 2015, while "Keep On Dancin'" debuted on Annie Mac's BBC Radio 1 show on 2 November. Delirium also includes "Love Me like You Do", which was originally released as a single from the soundtrack to the 2015 film Fifty Shades of Grey and became a commercial success worldwide.

Featuring 16 songs, the standard edition was released through Polydor Records in the United Kingdom (Note: In the United States, Delirium was released under exclusive license to Interscope and Cherrytree Records.) on 6 November 2015 to digital platforms. The 22-track deluxe edition was also released to vinyl, including Goulding's collaboration with Scottish DJ Calvin Harris, "Outside", while the North American deluxe edition contains "Powerful"—a collaboration with American electronic music trio Major Lazer (also featuring American-Jamaican singer Tarrus Riley). Both were released on the same day as the standard edition.

=== Singles ===
Goulding began teasing Delirium's lead single, "On My Mind", via her Twitter account on 15 September 2015. It was released on 17 September, the same day Goulding officially announced the album. The song premiered earlier that day on The Radio 1 Breakfast Show with Nick Grimshaw. Goulding performed "On My Mind" live for the first time at the Apple Music Festival in September, where she opened the event with the song. Its accompanying music video, directed by Emil Nava and filmed in Las Vegas, was unveiled simultaneously with the song's release. "On My Mind" received positive reviews and performed well commercially, reaching the top 10 in Australia, Canada, New Zealand, and the United Kingdom, and number 13 on the US Billboard Hot 100.

Delirium's promotional single, "Lost and Found", was released on 23 October. A week later, "Army" became available through the album's pre-order. It was released to Italian radio and US contemporary hit radio stations on 15 January and 19 April 2016, respectively, becoming the album's second single. "Army" peaked at number 20 on the UK Singles Chart and the top 20 in Scotland. In the United States, it peaked at number 33 on the Pop Airplay chart. "Something in the Way You Move" was released on 9 October 2015 in digital formats and impacted contemporary hit radio in the United States on 19 January 2016, becoming the album's third single. Goulding released a live performance of the song on 23 February. "Something in the Way You Move" peaked at numbers 51 and 43 in the United Kingdom and the United States, respectively.

=== Tour ===
In September 2015, the European legs of the Delirium World Tour was announced. It began on 24 September in Dubai and concluded on 24 March 2016 in London. In November 2015, Goulding announced the tour's North American leg, which began in Vancouver on 1 April 2016 and concluded in New York on 21 June. The tour's shows also spanned the United States, including a stop in Seattle and appearances at the Coachella, Bonnaroo and Hangout festivals. Critics highlighted Goulding's vocal delivery and the balance between the high-energy electropop performances and the more stripped-back moments.

== Critical reception ==
=== Reviews ===
Professional ratings
Aggregate scores
Source	Rating
Metacritic	70/100
Review scores
Source	Rating
AllMusic	3.5/5 stars
Clash	2/10
Entertainment Weekly	B−
NME	3/5
The Observer	4/5 stars
Pitchfork	7.2/10
PopMatters	7/10
Q	4/5 stars
Rolling Stone	3.5/5 stars
Spin	7/10

Delirium received generally positive reviews from music critics. According to the review aggregator Metacritic, the album received "generally favorable reviews" based on a weighted average score of 70 out of 100 from 15 critic scores.

Critics focused on Delirium's embrace of mainstream pop while discussing its accessibility and experimentation. Q magazine's Peter Robinson viewed the album as an expansion of Goulding's pop ambitions, while finding that its "nuanced" lyrics kept it from becoming homogeneous. Eve Barlow of Spin found a balance between pop uniformity and experimentation, while Zach Hollwedel of Under the Radar viewed it as Goulding's successful attempt to create a "big pop album". The Observer's Michael Cragg similarly noted that the album directly pursues pop sounds, and praised its songs for "almost always hit[ting] the spot". Writing for AllMusic, Matt Collar attributed the album's appeal to the combination of Goulding's "distinctive voice" and the songs' R&B influences. Pitchfork's Hazel Cills, however, felt that some tracks merely followed pop trends and suggested that the album's "darker, deeper tones" might have suited Meghan Trainor better. She nevertheless commended Goulding's ability to create dance music. Billboard author Carl Wilson praised the album's energy and regarded it as a successful experiment, but felt that it lacked the "sustained ambience" of Halcyon.

Delirium's polished production and Goulding's vocal performance received polarised assessments. Mark Allister of PopMatters acknowledged the greater sheen of Goulding's sound, while Jon Dolan of Rolling Stone praised her technical versatility. Clash's Joe Rivers, by contrast, described her voice as "too wispy" for some of its maximalist arrangements.

Some critics questioned whether Delirium's polished pop direction gave Goulding a sufficiently distinctive artistic identity. Consequence's Katherine Flynn felt that although parts of the album established Goulding within 2010s pop, it did not fully define her personal brand or a distinctive niche. Russell Warfield of Drowned in Sound similarly argued that the record placed greater emphasis on production than personality, finding that its polished pop songs lacked a strong sense of identity. The Line of Best Fit's Dave Beech offered a contrasting view, calling Delirium a "massive success" and noting that Goulding and her production team shaped the album's sound, which allowed it to retain a surprising amount of individuality despite being released by a major label.

Delirium's songwriting and consistency also drew criticism alongside praise for its ambition. Kyle Anderson of Entertainment Weekly considered "Scream It Out" and "Codes" among Goulding's best work as they "land in [her] comfort zone", while Matthew Horton of NME found the album's quality undeniable despite his overall sense of disappointment. Allister criticised its limited range of lyrical themes, while Dolan similarly felt that its songwriting did not consistently fulfil its ambitions. On the other hand, Anderson described the album as "honestly ambitious", while Cills praised Goulding's storytelling ability.

=== Accolades ===
Delirium appeared on multiple year-end lists of the best albums of 2015. It was ranked number three on The New Zealand Herald's "The Best Pop Music of 2015" list, number four on Popjustice's "The Top 33 Albums of 2015", number seven on Digital Spy's "The 25 Best Albums of 2015", and number 12 on Rolling Stone's "20 Best Pop Albums of 2015".

List of critics' rankings
Publication	Accolade	Rank	Ref.
Digital Spy	The 25 Best Albums of 2015	7	
The New Zealand Herald	The Best Pop Music of 2015	3	
Popjustice	The Top 33 Albums of 2015	4	
Rolling Stone	20 Best Pop Albums of 2015	12	

== Commercial performance ==
In the United Kingdom, Delirium peaked at number three on the UK Albums Chart—Goulding's third studio album to reach the top three—and number one on the Album Downloads Chart. It sold 38,429 copies in its first week, the biggest first-week sales of Goulding's career. The album also peaked at number three in Australia and the United States. In the former, Delirium became her second album to land within the top 10 and her highest-charting album, while in the latter, it earned Goulding her highest-peaking record with 61,000 album-equivalent units (42,000 in pure album sales). As of February 2016, the album had sold 117,000 copies in the US and was certified platinum by the Recording Industry Association of America.

Delirium reached number one in Belgium's Flanders region, becoming Goulding's highest-charting studio album there. The album also peaked in the top 5 in Austria, Canada, Germany, Ireland, New Zealand, Scotland, and Switzerland. On year-end charts, Delirium reached number 34 in the United Kingdom in 2015. In 2016, it reached number 38 in the nation and number 89 in the United States. The album has been certified double platinum in Canada, Norway, and Poland; platinum in Austria, New Zealand, Singapore, and the United Kingdom; gold in Denmark; and platinum-plus-gold in Mexico.

== Track listing ==
Standard edition
No.	Title	Writer(s)	Producer(s)	Length
1.	"Intro (Delirium)"	Ellie Goulding; Joe Kearns; Chris Ketley	Kearns; Ketley	1:54
2.	"Aftertaste"	Goulding; Greg Kurstin	Kurstin	3:46
3.	"Something in the Way You Move"	Goulding; Kurstin	Kurstin	3:47
4.	"Keep On Dancin'"	Goulding; Ryan Tedder; Nicole Morier; Noel Zancanella	Tedder; Zancanella; Anders Kjær^{[a]}; Synthomania^{[a]}	3:46
5.	"On My Mind"	Goulding; Max Martin; Savan Kotecha; Ilya Salmanzadeh	Martin; Ilya	3:33
6.	"Around U"	Goulding; Fred Gibson; Tristan Landymore; Joe Janiak	Kurstin; Fred^{[a]}; Kearns^{[b]}	3:17
7.	"Codes"	Goulding; Martin; Kotecha; Salmanzadeh	Ilya	3:16
8.	"Holding On for Life"	Kurstin; Goulding; Maureen "Mozella" McDonald	Kurstin	4:15
9.	"Love Me like You Do"	Martin; Kotecha; Salmanzadeh; Ali Payami; Tove Nilsson	Martin; Payami	4:12
10.	"Don't Need Nobody"	Goulding; Kotecha; Peter Svensson; Ludvig Söderberg; Jakob Jerlström; Martin	Svensson; The Struts	3:33
11.	"Don't Panic"	Goulding; Kurstin; McDonald	Kurstin	3:16
12.	"We Can't Move to This"	Goulding; Fred Gibson; Alex Gibson; Kurstin; McDonald	Fred; Kurstin^{[a]}^{[b]}	3:28
13.	"Army"	Goulding; Martin; Kotecha; Payami	Martin; Payami	3:57
14.	"Lost and Found"	Goulding; Carl Falk; Martin; Laleh Pourkarim; Joakim Berg	Falk; Martin; Kristian Lundin^{[a]}^{[b]}	3:36
15.	"Devotion"	Goulding; Klas Åhlund; Payami; Stephen Wrabel	Åhlund; Payami	3:46
16.	"Scream It Out"	Goulding; Jim Eliot	Kurstin; Eliot^{[b]}; Kearns^{[b]}	3:09
Total length:				56:31

Deluxe edition
No.	Title	Writer(s)	Producer(s)	Length
17.	"The Greatest"	Joel Little; Goulding	Little	3:31
18.	"I Do What I Love"	Goulding; Pourkarim	Pourkarim	2:51
19.	"Paradise"	Goulding; Little	Kurstin; Little^{[a]}	3:44
20.	"Winner"	Goulding; Pourkarim	Pourkarim; Gustaf Thörn^{[c]}	3:20
21.	"Heal"	Goulding; Guy Lawrence; James Napier	Lawrence; Jimmy Napes	4:52
22.	"Outside" (Calvin Harris featuring Ellie Goulding)	Calvin Harris; Goulding	Harris	3:47
Total length:				78:36

=== Notes ===
- ^{^[a]} signifies an additional producer.
- ^{^[b]} signifies a vocal producer.
- ^{^[c]} signifies an assistant producer.
- North American deluxe edition has bonus tracks issued on a separate disc, including "Powerful".
- Target edition features "Let It Die" and "Two Years Ago" as bonus tracks.
- "We Can't Move to This" contains elements from "It's Over Now" written and performed by 112.

== Credits and personnel ==
Credits were adapted from the deluxe edition's liner notes.

=== Recording locations ===
- British Grove Studios; London (track 1)
- Abbey Road Studios; London (track 1; vocals on tracks 6 and 8; choir on tracks 8, 16 and 17; strings on track 16)
- Echo Studios; Los Angeles (tracks 2, 3, 6, 8, 11, 12, 16 and 19)
- RAK Studios; London (track 4)
- Westlake Recording Studios; Los Angeles (track 4)
- MXM Studios; Los Angeles (tracks 5, 7, 9, 10, 13–15, 18 and 20)
- Wolf Cousins Studios; Stockholm (tracks 5, 7, 9, 10, 13 and 15)
- SMV Studios; London (vocals on track 6)
- The RedRoom; Gothenburg (strings on track 9)
- MXM Studios; Stockholm (track 9)
- P.S. Studio; Stockholm (track 10)
- Metropolis Studios; London (tracks 12 and 17)
- Studio at the Palms; Las Vegas (track 14; vocals on track 13)
- Kinglet Studios; Stockholm (track 14)
- Apmamman; Stockholm (track 15)
- Studio Splendido; Hereford (vocals on track 16)
- Little Kingdom; Los Angeles (tracks 17 and 19)
- Golden Age; Auckland (track 17)
- Sarm Music Village; London (tracks 18, 20 and 22)
- Musicbox Studios; London (track 21)
- Fly Eye Studio; London (track 22)

=== Musicians ===
- Ellie Goulding – lead vocals (all tracks); backing vocals (tracks 10, 18, 20); live percussion (tracks 18, 20)
- Joe Kearns – keyboards, programming (track 1)
- Chris Ketley – string arrangements (tracks 1, 16, 19); choir arrangements (tracks 8, 16, 17)
- Everton Nelson – violin (tracks 1, 16, 19)
- Emil Chakalov – violin (tracks 1, 16, 19)
- Richard George – violin (tracks 1, 16, 19)
- Jenny Sacha – violin (tracks 1, 16, 19)
- Sarah Tuke – violin (tracks 1, 16, 19)
- Max Baillie – viola (tracks 1, 16, 19)
- Emma Owens – viola (tracks 1, 16, 19)
- Ian Burdge – cello (tracks 1, 16, 19)
- Chris Worsey – cello (tracks 1, 16, 19)
- Greg Kurstin – bass, drums, guitar, piano, keyboards (tracks 2, 3, 6, 8, 11, 16, 19)
- Ryan Tedder – backing vocals, guitar, instrumentation, programming (track 4)
- Noel Zancanella – instrumentation, programming (track 4)
- Ilya – backing vocals (tracks 5, 9); guitar, bass, keyboards, programming (tracks 5, 7)
- Max Martin – keyboards (tracks 5, 9); programming (tracks 5, 9, 13); drums, percussion, bass (track 9); backing vocals (tracks 9, 13, 15)
- Fred – instrument arrangements (track 6); programming, synths, percussion, drums, keyboards, backing vocals (track 12)
- Jenny Schwartz – backing vocals (tracks 7, 13)
- Jeremy Lertola – backing vocals (track 7)
- Sam Holland – backing vocals (tracks 7, 13)
- Savan Kotecha – backing vocals (tracks 7, 9, 13)
- Annabel Williams – choir (tracks 8, 16, 17)
- Bobbie Gordon – choir (tracks 8, 16, 17)
- Hayley Sanderson – choir (tracks 8, 16, 17)
- Lloyds Wade – choir (tracks 8, 16, 17)
- Joshua Hayes – choir (tracks 8, 16, 17)
- Simone Daly-Richards – choir (tracks 8, 16, 17)
- Janet Ramus – choir (tracks 8, 16, 17)
- Dawn Joseph – choir (tracks 8, 16, 17)
- Ali Payami – programming (tracks 9, 13, 15); drums, keyboards, bass (tracks 9, 15); percussion (track 9); backing vocals (tracks 9, 13); guitar (track 13); synths (track 15)
- Mattias Bylund – strings, string arrangements (track 9)
- Mattias Johansson – violin (track 9)
- David Bukovinszky – cello (track 9)
- Peter Carlsson – backing vocals (tracks 9, 13)
- Oscar Holter – backing vocals (track 9)
- Robin Fredriksson – backing vocals (track 9)
- Mattias Larsson – backing vocals (track 9)
- Oscar Görres – backing vocals (track 9)
- Ludvig Söderberg – backing vocals (track 9)
- The Struts – programming, drums, bass, keyboards (track 10)
- Peter Svensson – programming, drums, bass, keyboards, additional backing vocals (track 10)
- The Wolf Cousins Royal Choir – gang vocals (track 10)
- Benjy Gibson – drums (track 12)
- Emmanuel Franklyn Adalebu – drums (track 12)
- Doris Sandberg – backing vocals (track 13)
- Cory Bice – backing vocals (track 13)
- Silke Lorenzen – backing vocals (track 13)
- Rickard Göransson – backing vocals (track 13)
- Carl Falk – guitar, programming, keyboards, backing vocals (track 14)
- Joakim Berg – acoustic guitar (track 14)
- Martin Sköld – bass guitar (track 14)
- Kristoffer Fogelmark – backing vocals (track 14)
- Laleh Pourkarim – backing vocals (tracks 14, 18); bass (track 18); drum programming, synths, live percussion (tracks 18, 20)
- Gustaf Thörn – backing vocals (tracks 14, 20); piano, organ, guitar, bass, string arrangements (track 20)
- Klas Åhlund – synths, bass, keyboards, programming (track 15)
- Jim Eliot – additional synths, guitar (track 16)
- Oli Langford – violin (tracks 16, 19)
- Reiad Chibah – viola (tracks 16, 19)
- Richard Pryce – double bass (tracks 16, 19)
- Joel Little – bass, drums, piano, keyboards (track 17); programming (track 19)
- Erik Arvinder – strings (track 20)
- Calvin Harris – all instruments (track 22)

=== Technical ===
- Joe Kearns – production, mixing (track 1); engineering (tracks 1, 6); string production (tracks 1, 16, 19); vocal production, vocal recording (track 6); choir production (tracks 8, 16, 17); additional vocals production, additional vocals recording (track 16); additional vocal engineering (track 20)
- Chris Ketley – string production (tracks 1, 16, 19); choir production (tracks 8, 16, 17)
- Jason Elliott – string engineering (tracks 1, 16, 19); choir engineering (tracks 8, 16, 17)
- Bob Knight – string supply (tracks 1, 16, 19); choir supply (tracks 8, 17)
- Greg Kurstin – production (tracks 2, 3, 6, 8, 11, 16, 19); engineering (tracks 2, 3, 6, 8, 12, 16, 19); vocal production (tracks 6, 12); recording (track 11); additional production, vocal recording (track 12)
- Alex Pasco – engineering (tracks 2, 3, 6, 8, 16, 19); recording (track 11)
- Julian Burg – engineering (tracks 2, 3, 6, 8, 16, 19); recording (track 11)
- Ryan Tedder – production (track 4)
- Noel Zancanella – production (track 4)
- Anders Kjær – additional production (track 4)
- Synthomania – additional production (track 4)
- Rich Rich – engineering (track 4)
- Rob Cohen – engineering assistance (track 4)
- Max Martin – production (tracks 5, 9, 13, 14)
- Ilya – production (tracks 5, 7)
- Sam Holland – engineering (tracks 5, 7, 9, 10, 13–15)
- Fred – additional production, vocal recording (track 6); vocal production, engineering (tracks 6, 12); production (track 12)
- Laleh Pourkarim – additional vocals recording (track 7); vocal recording (track 14); production (tracks 18, 20); engineering, vocal production (track 20)
- Ali Payami – production (tracks 9, 13, 15)
- Peter Carlsson – vocal editing (track 9)
- Mattias Bylund – string recording, string editing
- Peter Svensson – production (track 10)
- The Struts – production (track 10)
- Noah "Mailbox" Passovoy – engineering (track 10)
- Cory Bice – engineering assistance (tracks 10, 13–15)
- Jeremy Lertola – engineering assistance (tracks 10, 13, 14)
- Liam Nolan – vocal recording (track 12)
- Rob Katz – engineering (tracks 13, 14)
- Kristian Lundin – additional vocals recording (track 13); additional production, vocal recording, vocal production, vocal editing (track 14)
- Carl Falk – production (track 14)
- Klas Åhlund – production (track 15)
- Jim Eliot – vocal production (track 16)
- Joel Little – production (track 17); engineering (tracks 17, 19); vocal production, additional production (track 19)
- Gustaf Thörn – engineering assistance (tracks 18, 20); production assistance (track 20)
- Guy Lawrence – production (track 21)
- Jimmy Napes – production (track 21)
- Calvin Harris – production, mixing (track 22)
- Cameron Gower Poole – vocal engineering (track 22)
- Tom Campbell – engineering assistance (track 22)
- Simon Davey – mastering (track 22)
- Serban Ghenea – mixing (tracks 2–21)
- John Hanes – engineering for mix
- Tom Coyne – mastering
- Randy Merrill – mastering assistance

=== Artwork ===
- Ellie Goulding – creative direction
- Cassandra Gracey – creative direction
- David Roemer – photography
- Richard Andrews – design

== Charts ==
=== Weekly charts ===
Weekly chart performance
Chart (2015–2016)	Peak position
Australian Albums (ARIA)	3
Austrian Albums (Ö3 Austria)	5
Belgian Albums (Ultratop Flanders)	1
Belgian Albums (Ultratop Wallonia)	16
Canadian Albums (Billboard)	2
Czech Albums (ČNS IFPI)	9
Danish Albums (Hitlisten)	12
Dutch Albums (Album Top 100)	11
Finnish Albums (Suomen virallinen lista)	24
French Albums (SNEP)	34
German Albums (Offizielle Top 100)	5
Greek Albums (IFPI)	24
Irish Albums (IRMA)	2
Italian Albums (FIMI)	22
Japanese Albums (Oricon)	90
New Zealand Albums (RMNZ)	4
Norwegian Albums (VG-lista)	9
Polish Albums (ZPAV)	30
Portuguese Albums (AFP)	19
Scottish Albums (Official Charts)	5
South Korean Albums (Circle)	99
South Korean International Albums (Circle)	18
Spanish Albums (Promusicae)	25
Swedish Albums (Sverigetopplistan)	7
Swiss Albums (Schweizer Hitparade)	5
UK Albums (Official Charts)	3
US Billboard 200	3

=== Year-end charts ===
Year-end chart performance
Chart (2015)	Position
Belgian Albums (Ultratop Flanders)	79
UK Albums (OCC)	34
Chart (2016)	Position
New Zealand Albums (RMNZ)	42
Swedish Albums (Sverigetopplistan)	85
UK Albums (OCC)	38
US Billboard 200	89

== Certifications ==
Certifications and sales
Region	Certification	Certified units/sales
Austria (IFPI Austria)	Platinum	15,000^{*}
Canada (Music Canada)	2× Platinum	160,000^{‡}
Denmark (IFPI Danmark)	Gold	10,000^{‡}
Mexico (AMPROFON)	Platinum+Gold	90,000^{^}
New Zealand (RMNZ)	Platinum	30,000^{‡}
Norway (IFPI Norway)	2× Platinum	40,000^{‡}
Poland (ZPAV)	2× Platinum	40,000^{‡}
Singapore (RIAS)	Platinum	10,000^{*}
United Kingdom (BPI)	Platinum	389,000
United States (RIAA)	Platinum	1,000,000^{‡}
^{*} Sales figures based on certification alone.^{^} Shipments figures based on certification alone.^{‡} Sales+streaming figures based on certification alone.

== Release history ==
List of release dates and formats
Region	Date	Format(s)	Edition	Label	Ref.
Various	6 November 2015	CD; digital download; streaming	Standard; deluxe	Polydor	
Various	6 November 2015	Vinyl	Deluxe	Polydor	
United States	6 November 2015	CD	Target	Cherrytree; Interscope	

== See also ==
- List of 2015 albums
- List of number-one albums of 2015 (Belgium)
- List of UK top-ten albums in 2015
- List of UK Album Downloads Chart number ones of the 2010s
