= Something in the Way You Move =

2016 single by Ellie Goulding

Single by Ellie Goulding

from the album Delirium
- Released: 19 January 2016
- Recorded: 2015
- Studio: Echo (Los Angeles)
- Genre: Electropop
- Length: 3:47
- Label: Cherrytree; Interscope
- Songwriters: Ellie Goulding; Greg Kurstin
- Producer: Greg Kurstin

Ellie Goulding singles chronology
"Army" (2016)	"Something in the Way You Move" (2016)	"Still Falling for You" (2016)

Music video
- "Something in the Way You Move" on YouTube

"Something in the Way You Move" is a song by English singer-songwriter Ellie Goulding from her third studio album, Delirium (2015). The song was serviced to contemporary hit radio in the United States on 19 January 2016 as the album's second single in North America, and third overall. It reached number 51 on the UK Singles Chart and number 43 on the US Billboard Hot 100.

== Composition ==
"Something in the Way You Move" is an electropop song. Sheet music for the song shows the key of C-sharp minor and a tempo of 108 beats per minute, using the chords A, B, C#m, and E. Lyrically, the song describes an ill-fated attraction to someone. The Guardian's Alexis Petridis noted similarities between the song and "Love Me like You Do", another song from Delirium, saying it has "a virtually identical chorus". Eve Barlow of Spin wrote the chorus is reminiscent of the 1980s.

== Critical reception ==
"Something in the Way You Move" received mixed to positive reviews from music critics. MTV News dubbed the song "pure pop bliss". Ian Sandwell of Digital Spy praised it as "pure, unfiltered pop magic" and "pop gold". Idolator's Bianca Gracie deemed it "vibrant" and warned not to be surprised if "its bright vibe ends up taking over the radio." However, Music Times gave the track a negative review, calling it "generic pop" and stating there was nothing "interesting" about it. Hazel Cills of Pitchfork wrote that although the song is "a mighty fine song in a vacuum", Selena Gomez had already done something similar with "Me & the Rhythm".

== Music videos ==
A lyric video for "Something in the Way You Move" was released on 9 October 2015, and features fans of Goulding dancing in black and white behind the song's lyrics in lilac and blue. The official music video for the song was directed by Ed Coleman and premiered on 23 February 2016, consisting of live footage of Goulding's performance in Antwerp, Belgium, as part of the Delirium World Tour.

On 21 June 2017, a second video was released to Goulding's Vevo page. Filmed exclusively for Goulding's Deichmann 2017 Spring Summer collection and directed by Emil Nava, the video shows Goulding dancing and performing the song wearing footwear from the collection range.

== Live performances ==
Goulding performed "Something in the Way You Move" on Channel 4's TFI Friday on 27 November 2015. On 31 December, she performed the song on Alan Carr's New Year Specstacular.

== Credits and personnel ==
Credits adapted from the liner notes of Delirium.

=== Recording ===
- Recorded at Echo Studio (Los Angeles)
- Mixed at MixStar Studios (Virginia Beach, Virginia)
- Mastered at Sterling Sound (New York City)

=== Personnel ===
- Ellie Goulding – vocals
- Greg Kurstin – production, engineering, bass, drums, guitar, piano, keyboards
- Alex Pasco – engineering
- Julian Burg – engineering
- Serban Ghenea – mixing
- John Hanes – engineering for mix
- Tom Coyne – mastering
- Randy Merrill – mastering assistance

== Charts ==
=== Weekly charts ===
Weekly chart performance for "Something in the Way You Move"
Chart (2015−2016)	Peak position
Argentina (Monitor Latino)	10
Australia (ARIA)	46
Austria (Ö3 Austria Top 40)	52
Belgium (Ultratop 50 Flanders)	17
Belgium (Ultratop 50 Wallonia)	23
Canada Hot 100 (Billboard)	59
Canada AC (Billboard)	30
Canada CHR/Top 40 (Billboard)	26
Canada Hot AC (Billboard)	13
Czech Republic Singles Digital (ČNS IFPI)	35
France (SNEP)	97
Germany (GfK)	70
Germany Airplay (BVMI)	1
Ireland (IRMA)	62
Netherlands (Dutch Top 40)	32
Netherlands (Single Top 100)	69
Poland Airplay (ZPAV)	5
Scottish Singles Sales (Official Charts)	27
Slovakia Airplay (ČNS IFPI)	26
Slovakia Singles Digital (ČNS IFPI)	49
Slovenia (SloTop50)	8
Sweden Heatseekers (Sverigetopplistan)	1
Switzerland (Schweizer Hitparade)	58
UK Singles (Official Charts)	51
US Billboard Hot 100	43
US Adult Contemporary (Billboard)	19
US Adult Pop Airplay (Billboard)	7
US Pop Airplay (Billboard)	13

=== Year-end charts ===
Year-end chart performance for "Something in the Way You Move"
Chart (2016)	Position
Argentina (Monitor Latino)	55
Belgium (Ultratop Wallonia)	97
US Adult Top 40 (Billboard)	30

== Certifications ==
Certifications for "Something in the Way You Move"
Region	Certification	Certified units/sales
New Zealand (RMNZ)	Gold	15,000^{‡}
Poland (ZPAV)	Gold	10,000^{‡}
United States (RIAA)	Gold	500,000^{‡}
^{‡} Sales+streaming figures based on certification alone.

== Release history ==
Release dates and formats for "Something in the Way You Move"
Region	Date	Format	Label	Ref.
Various	9 October 2015	Digital download (Note: Release as a promotional single)	Polydor	
United States	19 January 2016	Contemporary hit radio	Cherrytree; Interscope	
Italy	29 April 2016	Radio airplay	Universal	
