= Lost and Found (Ellie Goulding song) =

Promotional single by Ellie Goulding

from the album Delirium
- Released: 23 October 2015
- Studio: MXM (Los Angeles, California); Studio at the Palms (Las Vegas, Nevada); Kinglet (Stockholm, Sweden)
- Genre: Pop
- Length: 3:36
- Label: Polydor
- Songwriters: Ellie Goulding; Carl Falk; Max Martin; Laleh Pourkarim; Joakim Berg
- Producers: Carl Falk; Max Martin; Kristian Lundin (add. and vocal)

Ellie Goulding promotional singles chronology
"Fall into the Sky" (2014)	"Lost and Found" (2015)	"Fields of Gold" (2022)

"Lost and Found" is a song by English singer-songwriter Ellie Goulding from her third studio album, Delirium (2015). It was released as a promotional single on 23 October 2015.

== Composition ==
"Lost and Found" is a pop song, with a tempo of 138 beats per minute. Co-written by Goulding, Carl Falk, Max Martin, Laleh Pourkarim and Joakim Berg, it is a strumming, guitar-based mid-tempo song combining elements of folk and electronic music. According to Goulding, Martin originally wrote the song for Fleetwood Mac drummer Mick Fleetwood.

== Critical reception ==
The song received mostly positive reviews. Lewis Corner of Digital Spy called the song as a "sparkling pop anthem". Rachel Brodsky of Spin wrote, "[The song] that would likely take off in any club setting", praising his chorus, saying that his beats "which never hurts". Bianca Gracie Idolator stated the song "is one of the strongest tracks [Goulding] has released thus far."

== Credits and personnel ==
Credits adapted from the liner notes of Delirium.

Recording

- Recorded at MXM Studios (Los Angeles, California), Studio at the Palms (Las Vegas, Nevada) and Kinglet Studios (Stockholm, Sweden)
- Mixed at MixStar Studios (Virginia Beach, Virginia)
- Mastered at Sterling Sound (New York City, New York)

Personnel

- Ellie Goulding – lead vocals
- Carl Falk – production, guitars, programming, keys, backing vocals
- Max Martin – production, backing vocals
- Kristian Lundin – additional production, vocal recording, vocal production, vocal editing
- Sam Holland – engineering
- Rob Katz – engineering
- Cory Bice – engineering assistance
- Jeremy Lertola – engineering assistance
- Laleh Pourkarim – vocal recording, backing vocals
- Joakim Berg – acoustic guitars
- Martin Sköld – bass guitar
- Kristoffer Fogelmark – backing vocals
- Gustaf Thörn – backing vocals
- Serban Ghenea – mixing
- John Hanes – engineering for mix
- Tom Coyne – mastering
- Randy Merrill – mastering assistance

== Charts ==
Chart (2015)	Peak position
Australia (ARIA)	70
Chile Singles Chart (Top 100)	99
Ireland (IRMA)	75
Sweden (Sverigetopplistan)	89
UK Singles (Official Charts)	57
