= Chris Ketley =

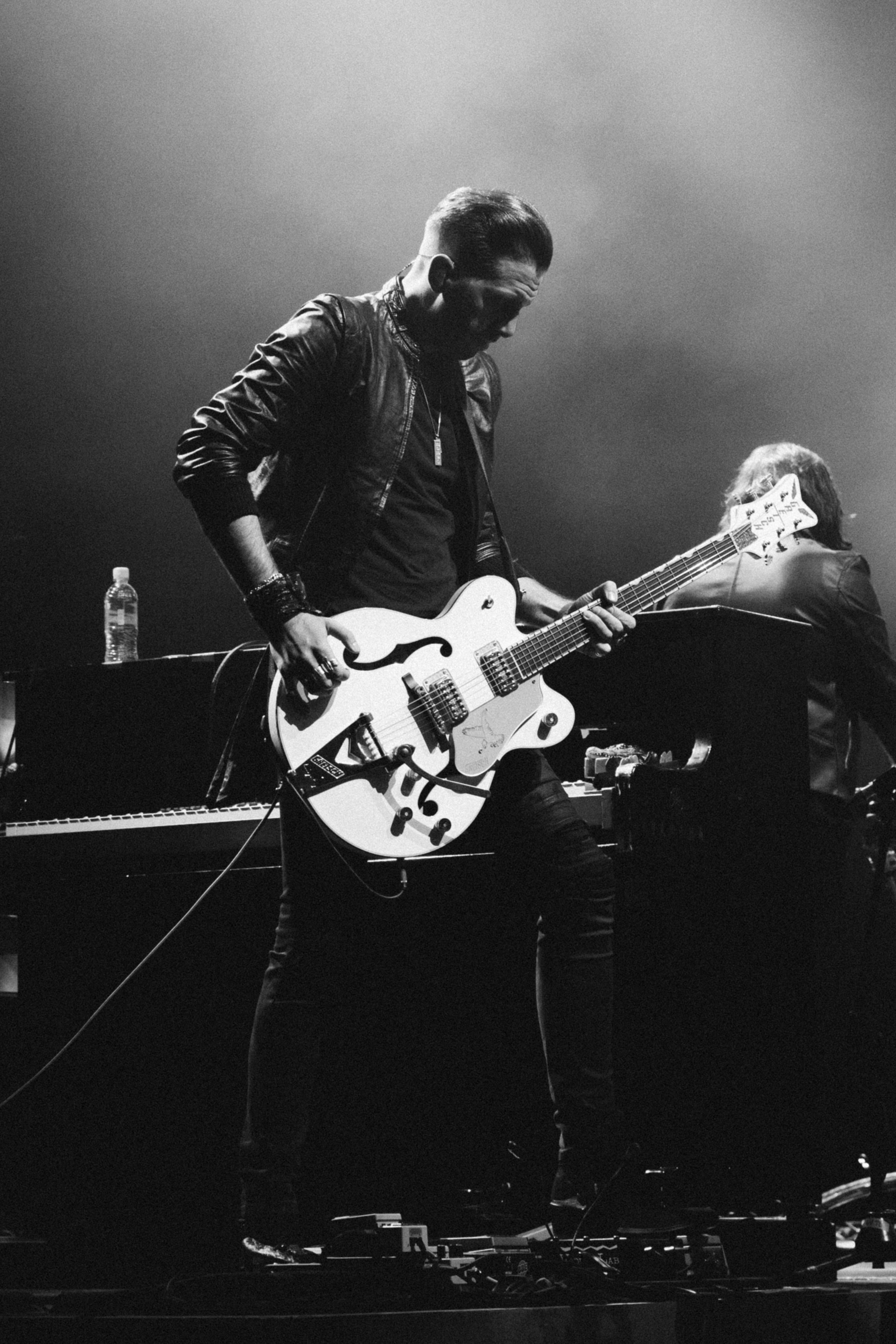
- Chris Ketley performing live in 2017

Background information
- Born: 29 January 1985 (age 41)
- Occupations: Musician, arranger, musical director, composer, producer
- Instruments: Guitar, piano, bass
- Website: chrisketley.co.uk

Chris Ketley (born 29 January 1985) is a British, London-based multi-instrumentalist, musical director, arranger, composer and producer.

He is most well known for being a pop session musician playing guitar and piano for Ellie Goulding and has previously worked with a variety of bands and artists such as Bryan Ferry, Zendaya, Banks, the Rakes, Dua Lipa, Markus Feehily (of Westlife), Martin Luke Brown, Betsy, DJ Fresh, Christophe Willem, Conor Maynard, Rumer, the Moons, and the On Offs.

He has made TV appearances with CeeLo Green, Katherine Jenkins, Cher, Gary Barlow, Alfie Bow, Barry Manilow, Donny Osmond and LeAnn Rimes.

In addition to his live experience, Ketley composes and produces music for placement on advertising campaigns, TV, short films and other bespoke media. His clients have included the BBC, 20th Century Fox, Biscuit Filmworks (Noam Murro), Pantene, Universal Music and Grey London.

Some of his live career highlights include a headline show at Madison Square Garden, The Pyramid Stage at Glastonbury Festival, Saturday Night Live, Later with Jools Holland, Coachella Festival and a headline show at Red Rocks Amphitheatre.

== Early career ==
Ketley's career started in his late teens playing for UK bands such as the On Offs whilst touring the UK and Europe. By the age of 21, he was touring the world with UK post-punk band the Rakes. By his mid-twenties, Ketley was playing with Ellie Goulding on some of the world's biggest stages, TV shows and open-air festivals.

== Bryan Ferry at the Hollywood Bowl ==
Ketley composed orchestral arrangements for Bryan Ferry's headline show at the Hollywood Bowl on 26 August 2017. The full orchestra was conducted by Thomas Wilkins. Ketley worked closely with Ferry and his team to compose 18 new scores for the concert for a full size symphony orchestra. He worked closely with Jessica Dannheisser who assisted in orchestrating.

== Strings arrangements ==
Ketley has arranged, recorded and produced strings at Abbey Road Studios, Air Studios, and British Grove Studios. His arrangements have been used live at the Royal Albert Hall, Hollywood Bowl, and Carnegie Hall.

He arranged the strings and group vocals across multiple tracks on Ellie Goulding's album Delirium in addition to live recordings and special acoustic releases of singles such as "Love Me like You Do", from the soundtrack of the film Fifty Shades of Grey.

== Royal wedding ==
Ketley accompanied Ellie Goulding when she was asked to sing at the Royal wedding reception in 2011. The Duke of Cambridge and Duchess of Cambridge asked Goulding to sing her cover version of Elton John's "Your Song" for their first dance.

== Live career ==
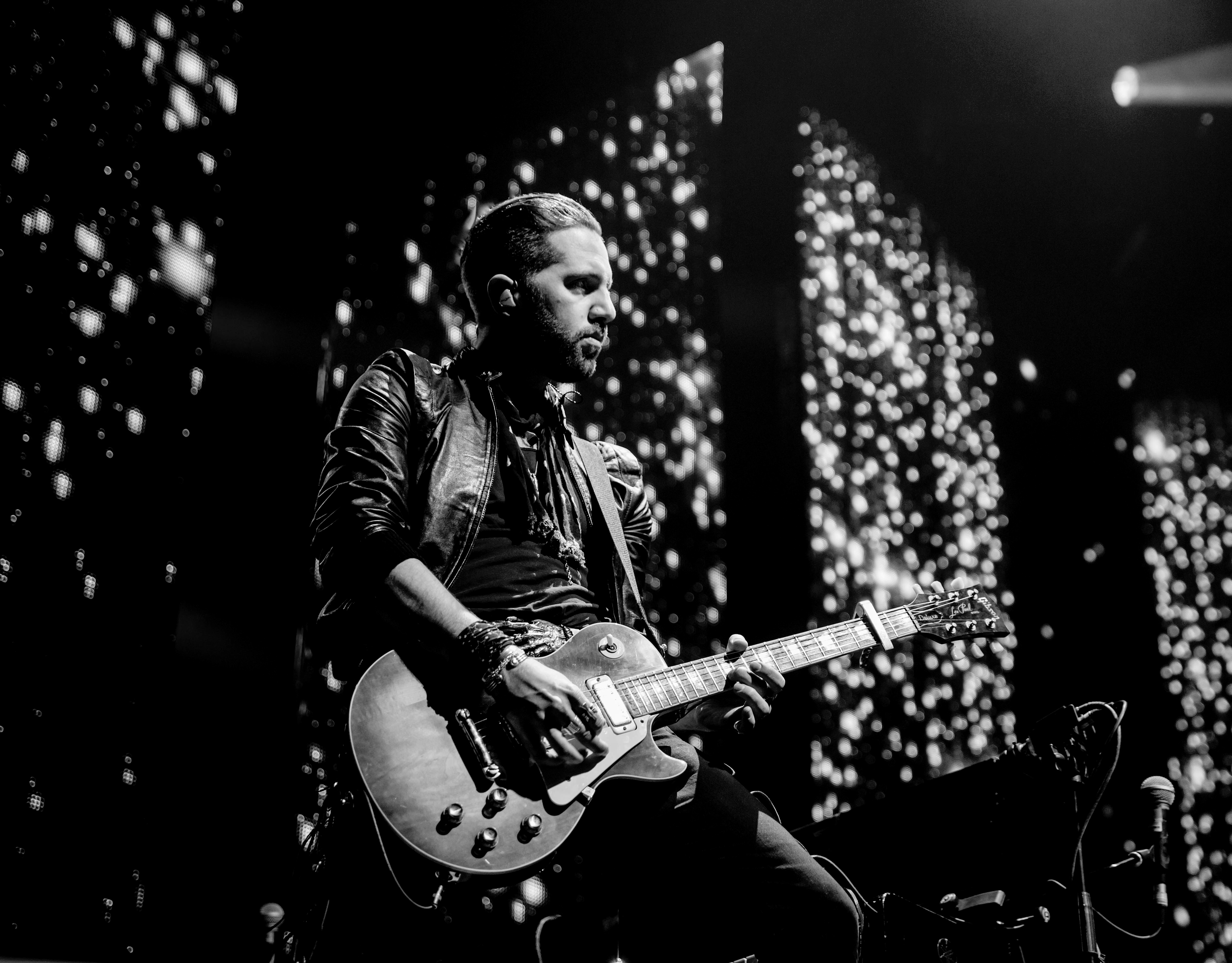
Chris Ketley playing Live 2016

Artist	Instrument	Dates
Ellie Goulding	Lead guitar, keyboards	2010–2018
The Rakes	Guitar, piano, backing vocals	2007–2010
Dua Lipa	Guitar, keyboards	2015
Markus Feehily	Guitar	2015
Christophe Willem	Guitar, keyboards, bass, backing vocals	2013–2014
Conor Maynard	Guitar, keyboards, programming	2015
Rumer	Guitar, keyboards	2011
The Moons	Guitar, backing vocals	2009–2011
The On/Offs	Guitar, piano	2006–2007

== Television appearances ==
Artist	Instrument	TV Show
LeAnn Rimes	Bass	The Graham Norton Show
Donny Osmond	Bass	Strictly Come Dancing
Barry Manilow	Guitar	Strictly Come Dancing
Alfie Bow	Ukuele	Alan Titchmarsh Show
Gary Barlow	Guitar	The X Factor
Cher	Piano	The X Factor/Graham Norton Show
Katherine Jenkins	Bass	Lorraine Kelly
CeeLo Green	Bass	Strictly Come Dancing
Ellie Goulding	Guitar, bass, keyboards	The X Factor, Britain's Got Talent, Saturday Night Live, Conan, The Jonathan Ross Show, Top of the Pops, Jools Holland, Graham Norton, The Ellen DeGeneres Show, Jimmy Fallon, Alan Carr, Blue Peter, The One Show

== Discography ==
Artist	Year	Project	Album	Role	Ref.
The Rakes	2009	"You're in It", "That's the Reason", "The Loneliness of the Outdoor Smoker", "1989", "Shackleton", "The Light from Your Mac", "The Final Hill"	Klang	Guitar	
The Rakes	2009	"Muller's Ratchet"	Klang	Guitar, piano	
The Rakes	2009	"Bitchin' in the Kitchin'", "The Woes of the Working Woman"	Klang	Piano	
The Moons	2010	"Don't Go Changin'", "Chinese Whispers", "Let It Go", "Torn Between the Two", "Nightmare Day", "Promise Not to Tell", "How Long", "The Ragman", "Everyday Heroes", "Lost Soul", "Wondering", "Last Night on Earth"	Life on Earth	Guitar	
Ellie Goulding	2010	"The Writer" (live acoustic version)	An Introduction to Ellie Goulding	Piano, acoustic guitar	
Ellie Goulding	2010	"Lights" (live), "This Love (Will Be Your Downfall)" (live), "The Writer" (live)	iTunes Festival: London 2010 - EP	Keyboards, bass guitar, electric guitar, bass	
Ellie Goulding	2010	"Guns and Horses" (live), "Salt Skin" (live), "Starry Eyed" (live)	iTunes Festival: London 2010 - EP	Keyboards, bass guitar, electric guitar	
Ellie Goulding	2012	"Figure 8" (live), "My Blood" (live), "Explosions" (live), "I Know You Care" (live), "Anything Could Happen" (live), "Starry Eyed" (live)	iTunes Festival: London 2012 - EP	Guitar	
Ellie Goulding	2013	"My Blood" (iTunes Session), "Burn" (iTunes Session), "Anything Could Happen" (iTunes Session), "How Long Will I Love You?" (iTunes Session), "Starry Eyed" (iTunes Session), "Lights" (iTunes Session)	iTunes Session - EP	Keyboards, guitar	
Ellie Goulding	2013	"How Long Will I Love You?"	Halcyon Days	Piano, arranger	
Ellie Goulding	2014	"All I Want" (Kodaline cover)	Non-album single	Piano, arranger	
Ellie Goulding	2014	"Love Me Like You Do"	Delirium and Fifty Shades of Grey soundtrack	Arranger	
Ellie Goulding	2015	"Intro (Delirium)"	Delirium	Arranger, strings, production, writer	
Ellie Goulding	2015	"Holding On for Life"	Delirium	Choir, vocal arranger, additional producer	
Ellie Goulding	2015	"Scream It Out"	Delirium	Strings arranger, choir arranger, vocal producer	
Ellie Goulding	2015	"The Greatest"	Delirium	Choir arranger, vocal producer	
Ellie Goulding	2015	"Paradise"	Delirium	Strings arranger	
Ellie Goulding	2016	"O Holy Night"	Songbook for Christmas	Keyboards, guitar, strings arranger, vocal arranger, producer	
Ellie Goulding	2016	"Army – Abbey Road Performance"	Army - EP	Producer, piano, arranger, strings	
Ellie Goulding	2016	"Love Me Like You Do – Abbey Road Version"	Non-album singles	Piano, guitar, arranger, strings, production	
Ellie Goulding	2017	"Avail"	Non-album singles	Arranger, strings, production, writer	
Zendaya	2017	"Rewrite The Stars" (acoustic)	The Greatest Showman	Guitar, piano, arranger, producer	
Ellie Goulding	2020	"Love I'm Given" (Apple Music Home Session)	Apple Music Home Session: Ellie Goulding	Producer, strings arranger, guitar, bass, Hammond organ, Rhodes piano	
Himself and Carlos García Valenica	2023	"Cloak & Dagger", "Last Man Standing", "Ready Aim Desire", "No Contest", "Cuts & Bruises", "Final Drive"	Abbey Road Masters: Heavy on the Riff	Lead credits, composer, producer, guitar programming	
Himself	2024	"Come of Age", "Time of Your Life"	Abbey Road Masters: Folky Pop	Lead credits, performer, writer	

== Awards ==
Ketley's work on a piece of music called "Avail", which was used in an online advert to raise awareness about domestic violence, was awarded a Cannes Lions award in 2017. The piece of music was set to picture by Biscuit Filmworks production company, directed by Noam Murro, commissioned by Victim Support, choreographed by Sidi Larbi Cherkaoui.

The piece of music was co-written by Ketley, Joe Kearns and Ellie Goulding, arranged by Ketley, and co-produced by Ketley and Kearns.

== Endorsements ==
- Gretsch Guitars
- Hofner Guitars
- Blackstar Amplification
