= Army (Ellie Goulding song) =

2016 single by Ellie Goulding

Single by Ellie Goulding

from the album Delirium
- Released: 15 January 2016
- Studio: MXM (Los Angeles, California); Wolf Cousins (Stockholm, Sweden); Studio at the Palms (Las Vegas, Nevada)
- Genre: Pop
- Length: 3:57
- Label: Polydor
- Songwriters: Ellie Goulding; Max Martin; Savan Kotecha; Ali Payami
- Producers: Max Martin; Ali Payami

Ellie Goulding singles chronology
"On My Mind" (2015)	"Army" (2016)	"Something in the Way You Move" (2016)

Music video
- "Army" on YouTube

"Army" is a song by English singer-songwriter Ellie Goulding from her third studio album, Delirium (2015). The song was serviced to contemporary hit radio in the United States on 19 April 2016 as the album's third single in North America, and second overall on 15 January 2016.

== Composition ==
"Army" is written in the key of B major with a tempo of 87 beats per minute. Goulding's vocals span from B_{3} to B_{4}. The song was written about Goulding's best and closest friend, Hannah.

== Music video ==
The music video for "Army" was directed by Conor McDonnell and premiered on 14 January 2016. Shot in black and white, the video features Goulding having fun with friends in several settings, as well as performing the song live.

== Track listings ==
Digital EP
No.	Title	Length
1.	"Army" (Orchestral Abbey Road Performance) (Live)	4:12
2.	"Army" (Danny Dove Remix)	3:13
3.	"Army" (Mike Mago Remix)	3:18
Total length:		10:44

Digital download – remixes
No.	Title	Length
1.	"Army" (Mike Mago Remix)	3:18
2.	"Army" (Danny Dove Remix)	3:13
Total length:		6:31

== Credits and personnel ==
Credits adapted from the liner notes of Delirium.

=== Recording ===
- Recorded at MXM Studios (Los Angeles, California) and Wolf Cousins Studios (Stockholm, Sweden)
- Vocals recorded at Studio at the Palms (Las Vegas, Nevada)
- Mixed at MixStar Studios (Virginia Beach, Virginia)
- Mastered at Sterling Sound (New York City, New York)

=== Personnel ===
- Ellie Goulding – vocals
- Max Martin – production, programming, backing vocals
- Ali Payami – production, guitars, programming, backing vocals
- Sam Holland – engineering, backing vocals
- Rob Katz – engineering
- Cory Bice – engineering assistance, backing vocals
- Jeremy Lertola – engineering assistance, backing vocals
- Kristian Lundin – additional vocals recording
- Savan Kotecha – backing vocals
- Doris Sandberg – backing vocals
- Jenny Schwartz – backing vocals
- Peter Carlsson – backing vocals
- Silke Lorenzen – backing vocals
- Rickard Göransson – backing vocals
- Serban Ghenea – mixing
- John Hanes – engineering for mix
- Tom Coyne – mastering
- Randy Merrill – mastering assistance

== Charts ==
Chart performance for "Army"
Chart (2015–2016)	Peak position
Australia (ARIA)	87
Belgium (Ultratop 50 Flanders)	41
Czech Republic Airplay (ČNS IFPI)	52
Ireland (IRMA)	53
Scottish Singles Sales (Official Charts)	13
Slovakia Airplay (ČNS IFPI)	37
UK Singles (Official Charts)	20
US Pop Airplay (Billboard)	33

== Certifications ==
Certifications for "Army"
Region	Certification	Certified units/sales
United Kingdom (BPI)	Gold	400,000^{‡}
^{‡} Sales+streaming figures based on certification alone.

== Release history ==
Release dates and formats for "Army"
Region	Date	Format	Label	Ref.
Various	30 October 2015	Digital download (Note: Via pre-order of Delirium)	Polydor	
Italy	15 January 2016	Radio airplay	Universal	
Various (Note: Except North America)	29 January 2016	Digital EP	Polydor	
United States	19 April 2016	Contemporary hit radio	Cherrytree; Interscope	
United States	29 April 2016	Digital download (remixes)	Cherrytree; Interscope	
