= On My Mind (Ellie Goulding song) =

2015 single by Ellie Goulding

Single by Ellie Goulding

from the album Delirium
- Released: 17 September 2015
- Recorded: 2015
- Studio: MXM (Los Angeles, California); Wolf Cousins (Stockholm, Sweden)
- Genre: Electropop; R&B
- Length: 3:32
- Label: Polydor
- Songwriters: Ellie Goulding; Max Martin; Savan Kotecha; Ilya Salmanzadeh
- Producers: Max Martin; Ilya

Ellie Goulding singles chronology
"Powerful" (2015)	"On My Mind" (2015)	"Army" (2016)

Music video
- "On My Mind" on YouTube

"On My Mind" is a song by English singer-songwriter Ellie Goulding from her third studio album, Delirium (2015). It was released on 17 September 2015, by Polydor Records, serving as the album's lead single. Written by Goulding, Max Martin, Savan Kotecha and Ilya Salmanzadeh, "On My Mind" is an electropop and R&B song whose instrumentation consists of scratchy guitars, trap drums, slapped beats and sharp, syncopated electronica. Lyrically, the track talks about a one-night stand with someone the protagonist should not be with, prompting a dichotomy between heart and head. Though firmly denied by Goulding, many critics considered it an answer song to Ed Sheeran's "Don't".

"On My Mind" received mostly positive reviews from music critics, who praised it for being a radio-friendly song, as well as Goulding's vocals. Multiple critics found it similar to the Police's 1979 song "Message in a Bottle". Commercially, "On My Mind" became another top-ten entry for Goulding in the United Kingdom, as well as in Australia and other five territories, while reaching the top 20 in other seven countries. In the United States, it reached number 13 on the Billboard Hot 100. Its Western-themed music video, directed by Emil Nava, was inspired by the 1991 film Thelma & Louise and shows Goulding in a revenge story in Las Vegas.

== Background and release ==
"On My Mind" was originally planned to be released in the first quarter of 2015, with British radio network Capital FM announcing that Goulding claimed that hopefully the single was set to be released around March 2015. However, the release was postponed due to the commercial success of "Love Me like You Do", released on 7 January as the second single of the soundtrack to the film, Fifty Shades of Grey. On 6 August, during iHeartMedia's annual music summit, it was revealed that Goulding's new single was called "On My Mind" and was set to be released "soon".

On 14 September, Goulding started teasing her then upcoming single through social media platforms. She first teased the song via Instagram sharing a gif, posting a 15-second clip of the song a day later. On 17 September, "On My Mind" was released to digital download by Polydor Records as her third studio album Delirium's lead single. A day later, the song was added to Italian radio.

== Composition ==
"I was just in the mood to write something fun and to experiment a little bit. My fans know me as always being quite honest and also being quite heartfelt. We just had fun with it. I love the vibe of the song. It's quite badass."

— Goulding, talking about the inspiration behind the track

"On My Mind" was written by Goulding, Savan Kotecha, Max Martin, and Ilya Salmanzadeh, with the latter two serving as the song's producers. According to the sheet music published at Musicnotes by Alfred Publishing, the song is written in the key of D minor, with a moderate tempo of 155 beats per minute. Goulding's vocal range spans from D4 to D5. It is an electropop and R&B song, with its instrumentation consisting in scratchy guitar, slapped beats, and trap drums. Matthew Norton of NME described it as "hyperactive, insistent R&B with a bit of Rihanna in the 'eh's", while Steven J. Horowitz of Billboard and Maeve McDermott of USA Today both perceived that its "wangy guitars" resemble the Police's "Message in a Bottle". During the song, Goulding takes a "plain-speaking" approach, while towards the end she goes in a "conciliatory" direction.

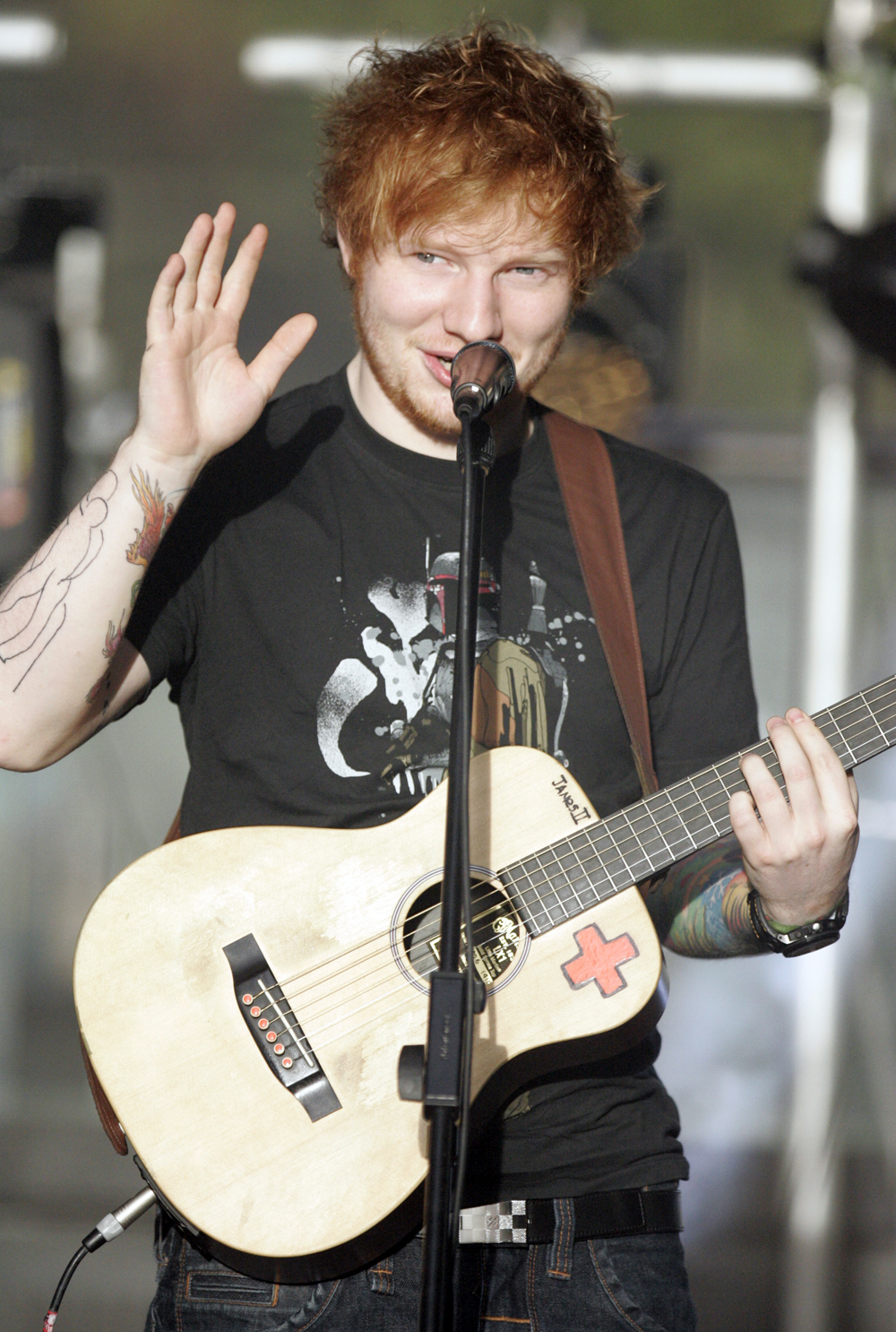
Though denied by Goulding, a handful of critics considered "On My Mind" an answer song to "Don't" by Ed Sheeran (pictured)

Lyrically, it talks about a one-night stand, presenting a dichotomy between heart and head, when we are with someone we shouldn't be with, or we want to be with someone we shouldn't be with. Though denied by Goulding, "On My Mind" was described by many critics as an answer song to Ed Sheeran's "Don't" (2014). According to Horton, while in "Don't", Sheeran sings, "Don't fuck with my love", Goulding responds in "On My Mind", "You don't mess with love/You mess with the truth". Q described it as a "guitar led, Swiftian tale of a drunken hook up with a tattooed admirer" inspired by a time when she was "on tour, drinking too much and going off the rails". Goulding commented to MTV News about its lyrical content, claiming:

"I think lyrically a lot of my fans will go back to when I first started releasing songs even on to Myspace and things like that because I was very explicit and honest with my lyrics and I would literally just sing what I was thinking. I think it's genuinely gone back to that. I think for the past couple of years I've maybe been filtering out lyrics quite a bit and going for a more typical kind of pop structure, but this song, we had so much fun writing it, it just comes back to that basic thing of having that person just constantly stuck in our heads." [...] "I'm sorry to all the people that want it to be about someone — it's not, it's like a myth." "I like guys with tattoos, my boyfriend has tattoos…but I don't mind. People can read into it however they want. It's fun to do that, I would do that too."

== Critical reception ==
"On My Mind" received mostly positive reviews from music critics. Steven J. Horowitz of Billboard gave the song a rating of 3.5 out of 5 stars, calling it a "surefire radio hit" and "a spicy kiss-off." Maeve McDermott of USA Today agreed, calling it "equally ubiquitous as Martin's latest smashes", also naming it "a radio-ready anthem". Matthew Horton of NME perceived that "[t]here's something of Sheeran in the delivery too", noting that "Goulding sounds like she's toasting as she gets her point across as economically as possible, quickfire lines filling dense, juddery verses" and naming it a "promising switch, whatever the intrigue." Carolyn Menyes of Music Times noted that "[t]he single maintains the drippy guitars and play of Goulding's hushed vocals. However, the song gets launched to a new level with some booming drums and a drop that's more similar to hip-hop than something from the discography of Calvin Harris."

Brennan Carley of Spin went on to name it "one of her best singles to date", meanwhile Christina Garibaldi of MTV News called it "an up-tempo track that checks all the boxes of what makes a pop smash. It's got an insanely catchy beat, a chorus that will be stuck in your head for days and lyrics that make you think." Nolan Feeney of Time wrote that the song "works its way between your synapses with a twitchy guitar riff and Goulding's lightning-quick verses about a relationship's squandered potential." Lewis Corner of Digital Spy gave the song a rating of 4 out of 5 stars, declaring that the song "presents the moment Miss Goulding becomes a pop powerhouse", noting that "the track's Police-styled guitar grooves and oscillating chorus [...] will weave in and around your cerebrum but never quite escapes. The subject may be ambiguous but one thing is for certain, this is Ellie stepping up and moving on."

While noting that "[i]t's a fun enough song" and picking as one of the essential tracks on the album, Katherine Flynn of Consequence of Sound wrote that "it doesn't invite multiple listens." Kyle Anderson of Entertainment Weekly called it " lively, flashy, confident earworm", while Hazel Cills of Pitchfork praised its "little well-done sass." Jon Dolan wrote for Rolling Stone that "Goulding's big voice is compacted into a series of taut flares over clipped hi-hats and Police-like guitar smears", with MusicOMH's Rob Mesure agreeing, calling it a "distant cousin of The Police's 'Message in a Bottle' reconfigured with deep bass drops." Matt Collar of AllMusic echoed the same thought, naming it "the Police-meets-Rihanna single [that] seem at first like an odd fit for Goulding's highly resonant, throaty chirp of a voice."

=== Year-end lists ===
Publication	Rank	List
Stereogum	22	The 50 Best Pop Songs of 2015

== Commercial performance ==
In the United Kingdom, "On My Mind" debuted at number seven during the week dated 1 October 2015, becoming the highest new chart entry and Goulding's 10th top-10 entry. The following week it climbed to number six, before peaking at number five a week later. In the United States, "On My Mind" debuted at number 22, the week's highest debut, in addition to Goulding's highest debut on that chart. It also debuted at number five on Digital Songs with 78,000 copies sold, and at number 44 on Streaming Songs with 4.6 million streaming. It has since reached number 13, and as of February 2016, it has sold 809,000 downloads. In Australia, the song started at number 15 on the ARIA Charts and climbed to number seven the following week, becoming her third top-10 solo entry and sixth overall; it reached number three in its third week. In New Zealand, the song debuted at number five and peaking at number four. It also peaked inside the top 10 in Finland, Ireland and Scotland, while it reached the top 20 in Belgium, Denmark, Hungary, Netherlands, Norway and Sweden.

== Music video ==
=== Background ===
On 25 August 2015, Goulding talked to Capital FM about the concept of the music video, claiming: "Well it involves me and another girl who's really hot and we're sort of like Thelma & Louise. [...] I guess [you'll see it] in about a month's time. I'm very excited about it." She also revealed that it was directed by Emil Nava and shot in Las Vegas, saying: "It's a weird place. We went to this old casino and filmed stuff in there. I worked with the director, Emil [Nava], I worked with him before with Calvin Harris [he directed the 'I Need Your Love' video]. He's a friend of mine and we wanted to do something really mad. We wanted to ride some horses, and there's a gangster who is a not very good guy. It's kind of got a Thelma and Louise thing about it." It was uploaded to Goulding's Vevo account on 21 September 2015.

=== Synopsis ===
At the beginning of the video, Goulding is seen in a Las Vegas hotel room setting interspersed between various shots of casinos and people riding horses. As the song begins, she is seen standing in front of a mirror examining herself, before her lover appears behind her, intercut with various short clips of cartoons from the Golden Age of American Animation, including the 1942 Merrie Melodies short The Wacky Wabbit, starring Bugs Bunny and Elmer Fudd (in slightly enhanced form) and a stock GIF of fighting behind a closed door. Between shots of Goulding singing towards the camera in an empty blue room, she and her lover are seen at different times in a hotel room and a ballroom together, and her lover is seen drinking at a bar alone. Goulding is then shown in a different setting standing in front of a caravan with Cristina Squyres, her accomplice, sitting in a chair beside her. The video cuts to an aggressive argument between Goulding and her lover in their hotel room, with him appearing multiple times in the same room constantly shouting and yelling at her while she sits on the end of the bed. The video gradually shows scenes of the falling apart of their relationship, and now Goulding and her accomplice are shown riding on horseback into Las Vegas and down the Las Vegas Strip, set on revenge on Goulding's former lover. Several shots of Goulding and her accomplice in a hair salon, her former lover living his wealthy lifestyle and flirting with another woman are shown while they continue to ride down the main strip. They approach an unnamed casino, presumably owned by her former lover, and enter the building on their horses while he counts his money. The women are caught on camera riding through the casino, while passing people playing on various poker machines. Her accomplice is seen smashing an expensive vase with a baseball bat interspersed with shots of their conversation in the salon and the two women outside their caravan holding guns.

Later, the two women are shown riding into an area outside the room her former lover is counting his money in, and her accomplice brandishes a sawn-off shotgun, blasting the door to the room open and frightening her former lover. They ride into the room and stay in place, while her former lover argues his case and pleads with them, while various nude glamour shots of Goulding and scenes before the end of their relationship play in between. Her accomplice takes the baseball bat and smashes the lightbulb above them, darkening the room. Her former lover is then seen tied to his chair with duct tape in the dimly lit room, while Goulding and her accomplice ride away on their horses with stacks of her former lover's money. Various scenes of the aftermath are then shown, including the two women back in the salon clinking their glasses, on a rooftop making it rain with money and her accomplice blowing a hole in the casino ceiling with the sawn-off shotgun. Goulding is then seen walking down a hotel hallway and back in the empty blue room singing, and the video ends with the two women riding off on their horses throwing money in the air.

== Track listing and formats ==
CD single

1. On My Mind — 3:35
2. On My Mind (Jax Jones remix) — 4:13

CD single (HMV exclusive)

1. On My Mind — 3:35
2. On My Mind (Jax Jones remix) — 4:13
3. On My Mind (Courage remix) — 4:04

Digital download – Remixes

1. On My Mind (Jax Jones remix) — 4:13
2. On My Mind (Metronomy remix) — 3:11
3. On My Mind (Courage remix) — 4:04

Digital download – MK Remix

1. On My Mind (MK remix) — 6:11
2. On My Mind (MK Dub) — 6:10
3. On My Mind (X-Mix edit) — 4:41

== Credits and personnel ==
Credits were adapted from the liner notes of Delirium.

=== Recording ===
- Recorded at MXM Studios (Los Angeles, California) and Wolf Cousins Studios (Stockholm, Sweden)
- Mixed at MixStar Studios (Virginia Beach, Virginia)
- Mastered at Sterling Sound (New York City)

=== Personnel ===
- Ellie Goulding – lead vocals
- Max Martin – production, keys, programming
- Ilya – production, background vocals, guitar, bass, keys, programming
- Sam Holland – engineering
- Serban Ghenea – mixing
- John Hanes – engineering for mix
- Tom Coyne – mastering
- Randy Merrill – mastering assistance

== Charts ==
=== Weekly charts ===
Weekly chart performance for "On My Mind"
Chart (2015−2016)	Peak position
Australia (ARIA)	3
Austria (Ö3 Austria Top 40)	14
Belgium (Ultratop 50 Flanders)	10
Belgium (Ultratop 50 Wallonia)	18
Canada Hot 100 (Billboard)	10
Canada AC (Billboard)	6
Canada CHR/Top 40 (Billboard)	4
Canada Hot AC (Billboard)	4
CIS Airplay (TopHit)	128
Colombia Anglo (Monitor Latino)	8
Czech Republic Airplay (ČNS IFPI)	33
Czech Republic Singles Digital (ČNS IFPI)	5
Denmark (Tracklisten)	16
Dominican Republic (Monitor Latino)	7
Euro Digital Song Sales (Billboard)	6
Finland (Suomen virallinen lista)	8
France (SNEP)	54
Germany (GfK)	9
Guatemala Airplay (Monitor Latino)	16
Hungary (Single Top 40)	17
Hungary (Stream Top 40)	7
Ireland (IRMA)	6
Israel International Airplay (Media Forest)	9
Italy (FIMI)	16
Mexico Anglo (Monitor Latino)	10
Netherlands (Dutch Top 40)	8
Netherlands (Single Top 100)	11
New Zealand (Recorded Music NZ)	4
Norway (VG-lista)	14
Poland Airplay (ZPAV)	37
Poland Dance (ZPAV)	48
Poland (Polish TV Airplay Chart)	1
Portugal (AFP)	25
Slovakia Airplay (ČNS IFPI)	20
Slovakia Singles Digital (ČNS IFPI)	2
Scottish Singles Sales (Official Charts)	7
Slovenia (SloTop50)	21
Spain (Promusicae)	19
Sweden (Sverigetopplistan)	18
Switzerland (Schweizer Hitparade)	17
UK Singles (Official Charts)	5
US Billboard Hot 100	13
US Adult Contemporary (Billboard)	16
US Adult Pop Airplay (Billboard)	1
US Dance Airplay (Billboard)	5
US Pop Airplay (Billboard)	5
US Rhythmic Airplay (Billboard)	36

=== Year-end charts ===
2015 year-end chart performance for "On My Mind"
Chart (2015)	Position
Australia (ARIA)	74
Germany (Official German Charts)	86
Italy (FIMI)	95
Netherlands (Dutch Top 40)	50
Netherlands (Single Top 100)	90
Spain (PROMUSICAE)	99
UK Singles (OCC)	75

2016 year-end chart performance for "On My Mind"
Chart (2016)	Position
Brazil (Brasil Hot 100)	88
Canada (Canadian Hot 100)	78
US Billboard Hot 100	81
US Adult Contemporary (Billboard)	37
US Adult Top 40 (Billboard)	18
US Mainstream Top 40 (Billboard)	37

== Certifications ==
Certifications and sales
Region	Certification	Certified units/sales
Australia (ARIA)	2× Platinum	140,000^{‡}
Belgium (BRMA)	Gold	10,000^{‡}
Brazil (Pro-Música Brasil)	2× Platinum	120,000^{‡}
Canada (Music Canada)	Platinum	80,000^{*}
Denmark (IFPI Danmark)	Platinum	60,000^{^}
Germany (BVMI)	Gold	200,000^{‡}
Italy (FIMI)	Platinum	50,000^{‡}
New Zealand (RMNZ)	2× Platinum	30,000^{*}
Norway (IFPI Norway)	Platinum	40,000^{‡}
Poland (ZPAV)	2× Platinum	40,000^{‡}
Spain (Promusicae)	Platinum	40,000^{‡}
Sweden (GLF)	Platinum	40,000^{‡}
United Kingdom (BPI)	Platinum	600,000
United States (RIAA)	2× Platinum	2,000,000^{‡}
^{*} Sales figures based on certification alone.^{^} Shipments figures based on certification alone.^{‡} Sales+streaming figures based on certification alone.

== Release history ==
Release dates and formats
Region	Date	Format	Version	Label	Ref.
Various	17 September 2015	Digital download	Original	Polydor	
Italy	18 September 2015	Radio airplay	Original	Universal	
Various	16 October 2015	Digital download	Remixes	Polydor	
Germany	23 October 2015	CD single	Original	Universal	
Various	30 October 2015	Digital download	MK Remix	Polydor	
United Kingdom	6 November 2015	CD single (HMV exclusive)	Original	Polydor	
