= Monsta =

Monsta or other variations may refer to:

- Animonsta Studios, or Monsta, a Malaysian animation studio
- Monsta (band) a British electronic music group now known as I See MONSTAS
  - Monsta (EP), their debut EP
- "Monsta!!", a 1995 single by American punk rock band Supernova
- "Monsta", a 2019 single by New Zealand singer Benee from the EP Stella & Steve

== See also ==
- Monsta X, a South Korean boy band
- Monster (disambiguation)
