= The Halcyon Days Tour =

2012–14 concert tour by Ellie Goulding

- Tour by Ellie Goulding
- Associated album: Halcyon
- Start date: 7 December 2012
- End date: 12 August 2014
- No. of shows: 126 total

Ellie Goulding concert chronology
- Ellie Goulding Tour (2010–11); The Halcyon Days Tour (2012–2014); Delirium World Tour (2016–2017)

The Halcyon Days Tour was the second tour by the English singer and songwriter Ellie Goulding, in support of her second studio album, Halcyon (2012). The tour visited venues with smaller capacity in North America and Europe. It began on 7 December 2012 in Bristol, England, and ended on 26 August 2014 in Taipei, Taiwan.

== Background ==
On 13 September 2012, it was announced that Goulding would embark on a nine-date tour across the United Kingdom. The tour's official name, The Halcyon Days Tour, was unveiled on 22 October 2012, along with North American dates, which will kick off in Miami Beach on 16 January 2013. "I'm so excited to start touring my new album Halcyon properly. I'm incredibly proud of this record and the reaction has been over-whelming. Touring and playing shows is my favorite part of what I do, and I really can't wait to get on the road", Goulding said. Additional European dates followed on 15 November 2012.

== Opening acts ==
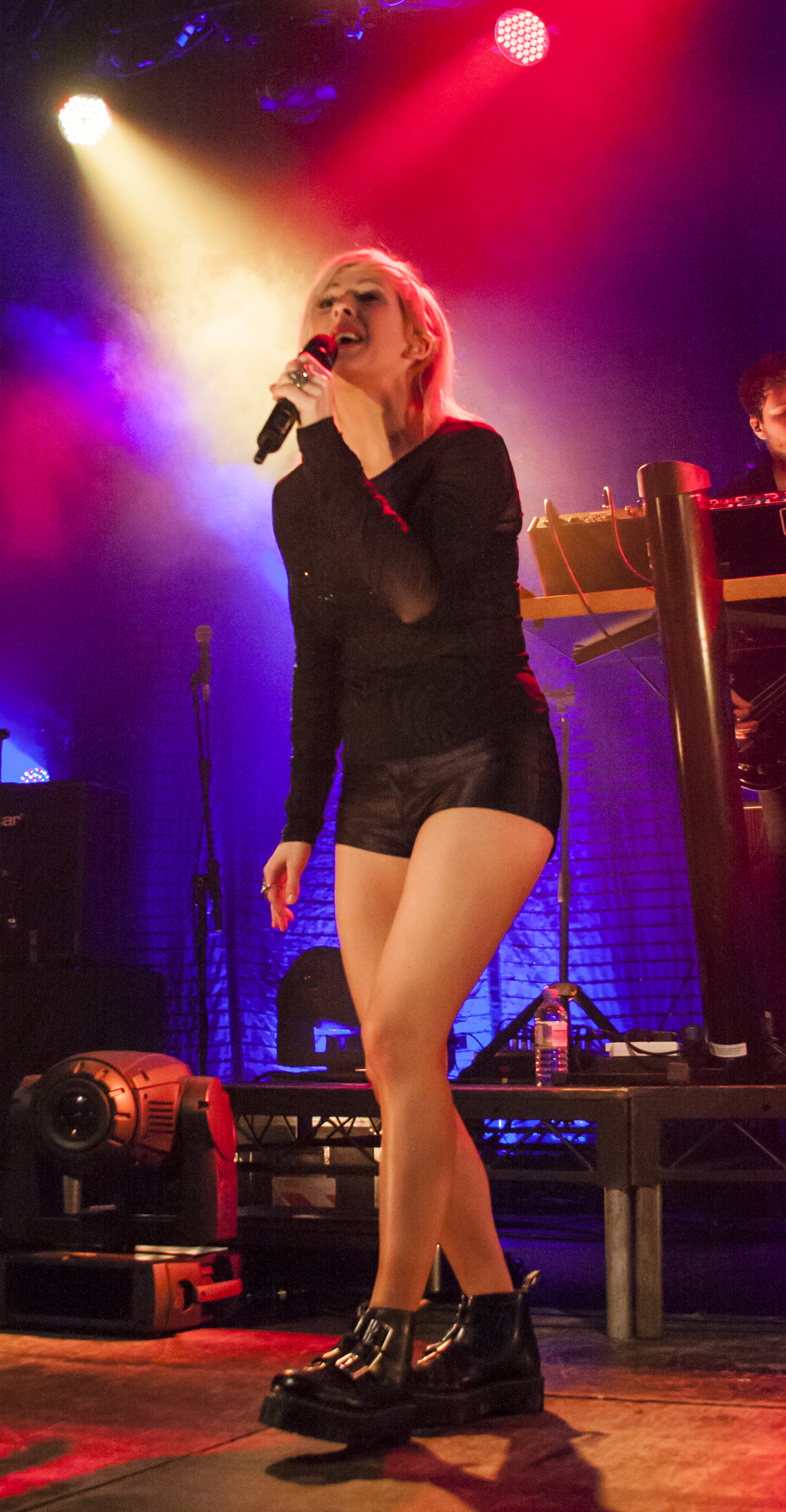
Goulding performing at Manchester Academy

- Yasmin
- Sons & Lovers
- St. Lucia (North America)
- Charli XCX (Europe)
- Chlöe Howl
- Chasing Grace
- Broods

== Setlists ==
Setlist
This show was from O_{2} Academy Sheffield, Sheffield on 3 October 2013. It does not represent each show on this tour.
1. Figure 8
2. Ritual
3. Goodness Gracious
4. Animal
5. Starry Eyed
6. Guns and Horses
7. I Know You Care
8. How Long Will I Love You
9. Your Song
10. Joy
11. Explosions
12. My Blood
13. Only You
14. Stay Awake
15. Anything Could Happen
16. I Need Your Love
17. Lights

Encore

18. You My Everything
19. Burn

== Tour dates ==
Date	City	Country	Venue
Europe
7 December 2012	Bristol	England	O_{2} Academy Bristol
8 December 2012	Liverpool	England	O_{2} Academy Liverpool
11 December 2012	Nottingham	England	Rock City
12 December 2012	London	England	O_{2} Brixton Academy
13 December 2012	Glasgow	Scotland	O_{2} Academy Glasgow
15 December 2012	Leeds	England	O_{2} Academy Leeds
16 December 2012	Birmingham	England	O_{2} Academy Birmingham
17 December 2012	Manchester	England	Manchester Academy
18 December 2012	Southampton	England	Southampton Guildhall
North America
16 January 2013	Miami Beach	United States	The Fillmore Miami Beach
17 January 2013	Hollywood	United States	Hard Rock Live
18 January 2013	Atlanta	United States	The Tabernacle
20 January 2013	Silver Spring	United States	The Fillmore Silver Spring
21 January 2013	New York City	United States	Terminal 5
22 January 2013	New York City	United States	Terminal 5
23 January 2013	Boston	United States	House of Blues
25 January 2013	Philadelphia	United States	Electric Factory
26 January 2013	Montreal	Canada	Métropolis
28 January 2013	Royal Oak	United States	Royal Oak Music Theatre
29 January 2013	Chicago	United States	Aragon Ballroom
30 January 2013	St. Louis	United States	The Pageant
1 February 2013	Denver	United States	Ogden Theatre
2 February 2013	Salt Lake City	United States	The Depot
4 February 2013	Seattle	United States	Showbox SoDo
5 February 2013	Vancouver	Canada	Commodore Ballroom
6 February 2013	Portland	United States	Crystal Ballroom
8 February 2013	Oakland	United States	Fox Oakland Theatre
9 February 2013	Los Angeles	United States	The Wiltern
12 February 2013	Los Angeles	United States	Hollywood Palladium
Asia
26 February 2013	Singapore		Esplanade Concert Hall
Europe
6 April 2013	Belfast	Northern Ireland	Waterfront Hall
7 April 2013	Dublin	Ireland	Olympia Theatre
9 April 2013	Amsterdam	Netherlands	Paradiso
10 April 2013	Copenhagen	Denmark	Vega Main Hall
12 April 2013	Oslo	Norway	Rockefeller Music Hall
13 April 2013	Stockholm	Sweden	Strand
15 April 2013	Helsinki	Finland	Tavastia Club
16 April 2013	Tallinn	Estonia	Rock Cafe
17 April 2013	Riga	Latvia	Palladium Riga
18 April 2013	Vilnius	Lithuania	Loftas
20 April 2013	Warsaw	Poland	Stodoła
21 April 2013	Prague	Czech Republic	SaSaZu
23 April 2013	Bratislava	Slovakia	Ateliér Babylon
24 April 2013	Milan	Italy	Magazzini Generali
25 April 2013	Vienna	Austria	WUK
27 April 2013	Berlin	Germany	Postbahnhof
28 April 2013	Munich	Germany	Theatrefabrik
29 April 2013	Cologne	Germany	Essigfabrik
1 May 2013	Brussels	Belgium	Ancienne Belgique
2 May 2013	Paris	France	Le Bataclan
3 May 2013	Luxembourg City	Luxembourg	Den Atelier
4 May 2013	Zürich	Switzerland	Härterei Club
United Kingdom
3 October 2013	Sheffield	England	O_{2} Academy Sheffield
4 October 2013	York	England	York Barbican
5 October 2013	Wolverhampton	England	Wolverhampton Civic Hall
7 October 2013	Newcastle	England	O_{2} Academy Newcastle
8 October 2013	Edinburgh	Scotland	Usher Hall
10 October 2013	Cardiff	Wales	Cardiff University
11 October 2013	Manchester	England	O_{2} Apollo Manchester
12 October 2013	Southampton	England	Southampton Guildhall
16 October 2013	London	England	Hammersmith Apollo
18 October 2013	Manchester	England	O_{2} Apollo Manchester
Europe
28 January 2014	Cologne	Germany	Live Music Hall
29 January 2014	Offenbach am Main	Germany	Capitol Offenbach
31 January 2014	Stockholm	Sweden	Fryshuset
1 February 2014	Oslo	Norway	Oslo Spektrum
2 February 2014	Copenhagen	Denmark	TAP1
4 February 2014	Hamburg	Germany	Große Freiheit 36
6 February 2014	Warsaw	Poland	Torwar Hall
7 February 2014	Vienna	Austria	Wiener Konzerthaus
8 February 2014	Munich	Germany	Kesselhaus
10 February 2014	Zürich	Switzerland	Maag Halle
12 February 2014	Paris	France	Le Trianon
13 February 2014	Paris	France	Le Trianon
14 February 2014	Brussels	Belgium	Forest National
15 February 2014	Amsterdam	Netherlands	AFAS Live
1 March 2014	Dublin	Ireland	The O_{2}
2 March 2014	Belfast	Northern Ireland	Odyssey Arena
5 March 2014	Nottingham	England	Capital FM Arena
8 March 2014	Liverpool	England	Echo Arena Liverpool
9 March 2014	London	England	The O_{2} Arena
North America
12 March 2014	New York City	United States	The Theater at MSG
13 March 2014	New York City	United States	The Theater at MSG
14 March 2014	Philadelphia	United States	Liacouras Center
16 March 2014	Washington D.C	United States	Echostage
17 March 2014	Boston	United States	Agganis Arena
20 March 2014	Atlanta	United States	Fox Theater
22 March 2014	Austin	United States	Austin Music Hall
24 March 2014	Houston	United States	Bayou Music Center
25 March 2014	Dallas	United States	South Side Ballroom
South America
29 March 2014 (Note: The concert on 29 March 2014 is part of Lollapalooza Chile.)	Santiago	Chile	Parque O'Higgins
2 April 2014 (Note: The concert on 2 April 2014 is part of Lollapalooza Argentina.)	San Isidro	Argentina	Hipodromo de San Isidro
6 April 2014 (Note: The concert on 6 April 2014 is part of Lollapalooza Brazil.)	São Paulo	Brazil	Autódromo de Interlagos
North America
9 April 2014	Tempe	United States	Marquee Theatre
11 April 2014 (Note: The concerts on 11 and 18 April 2014 are part of Coachella Valley Music and Arts Festival.)	Indio	United States	Empire Polo Club
12 April 2014	Las Vegas	United States	The Cosmopolitan of Las Vegas
15 April 2014	Pomona	United States	Fox Theater
16 April 2014	Ventura	United States	Ventura Theater
18 April 2014	Indio	United States	Empire Polo Club
19 April 2014	San Francisco	United States	Bill Graham Civic Auditorium
22 April 2014	Portland	United States	Arlene Schnitzer Concert Hall
23 April 2014	Seattle	United States	Paramount Theater
24 April 2014	Vancouver	Canada	Orpheum Theater
26 April 2014	Calgary	Canada	Macewan Hall
27 April 2014	Edmonton	Canada	Shaw Conference Center
29 April 2014	Garden City	United States	Revolution Concert House
1 May 2014	Magna	United States	The Great Saltair
2 May 2014	Morrison	United States	Red Rocks Amphitheatre
4 May 2014	West Palm Beach	United States	SunFest
7 May 2014	Cincinnati	United States	The Shoe at Horseshoe Casino
8 May 2014	Windsor	Canada	The Colosseum at Caesars Windsor
9 May 2014	Toronto	Canada	Kool Haus
Oceania
28 May 2014	Perth	Australia	Challenge Stadium
31 May 2014	Melbourne	Australia	Festival Hall
1 June 2014	Adelaide	Australia	AEC Theatre
3 June 2014	Sydney	Australia	Hordern Pavilion
5 June 2014	Brisbane	Australia	Brisbane Convention & Exhibition Centre
7 June 2014	Auckland	New Zealand	Vector Arena
9 June 2014	Wellington	New Zealand	TSB Bank Arena
11 June 2014	Christchurch	New Zealand	CBS Canterbury Arena
Asia
13 June 2014	Singapore		The Star Performing Arts Centre
23 July 2014	Beirut	Lebanon	Beirut International Exhibition & Leisure Center
12 August 2014	Hong Kong		Star Hall
23 August 2014 (Note: The concert on 23 August 2014 is part of Good Vibes Festival.)	Kuala Lumpur	Malaysia	Sepang Go Kart Circuit
24 August 2014	Jakarta	Indonesia	We The Fest
26 August 2014	Taipei	Taiwan	ATT Showbox

== Personnel ==
=== Band ===
- Ellie Goulding – lead vocals, drums, guitar
- Christian Ketley – guitar, keyboards, midi fighter, programming
- Simon Francis – bass guitar
- Maxwell Cooke – keyboards
- Joe Clegg – musical director/drums
