= Saints of Valory =

- Origin: Rio de Janeiro, Brazil
- Genres: Alternative
- Members: Stephen Buckle; Gavin Jasper; Godfrey Thomson
- Past members: Gerard Labou
- Website: saintsofvalory.net

Saints of Valory is an American alternative rock band from Austin, Texas. The band is composed of Gavin Jasper (lead vocals/bass), Godfrey Thomson (guitar/vocals), and Stephen Buckle (keyboards/vocals). The band released their V EP on May 19, 2014. This was a follow-up to the Possibilities EP, which released on July 9, 2013, via Atlantic Records. The debut EP features the single "Neon Eyes".

== History ==
The band was formed in 2008 in Rio de Janeiro, Brazil before relocating to Austin, Texas in 2010. Their origins are rooted in a childhood friendship between lead vocalist-bassist Gavin Jasper and Thomson, who met in Jasper's native Rio de Janeiro while their parents were working abroad. Jasper learned to play bass and joined a country-rock band, while Thomson launched his own band. In 2008, Jasper and Thomson reunited in Brazil, with Thomson bringing along his friend Gerard Labou, a young drummer from France. Calling themselves Saints of Valory (a reference to Labou's mother Valerie), the trio decided to form a band and took to MySpace to post their tracks, which attracted initial interest from independent labels. Needing a space to rehearse for a showcase, they contacted their friend Stephen Buckle, who had a small studio in his home in Boerne, Texas. Buckle was born in Greece to an American mother and Canadian father and spent most of his childhood in Thailand and Southeast Asia, but befriended Jasper during a four-year stint in Brazil. In April 2010, he joined the band full-time as a keyboardist.

After self-releasing their debut, The Bright Lights, in November 2010, featuring an early version of their track "Providence", the track entered the top 50 at Triple A radio, making the band the only unsigned artist to reach the upper tier of the chart. In May 2012, the band self-released their second EP, Kids, which entered iTunes' Top Rock Albums Chart, selling 1,700 copies in its first week.

Throughout 2011 the band performed at South by Southwest, CMJ, and DeLuna Festival.

== Atlantic Records, Possibilities EP ==
After being named one of Billboard's Top Unsigned Artists in 2012 the band announced their signing to Atlantic Records. The band's label debut Possibilities EP featuring the single "Neon Eyes" was released July 9, 2013 and was produced by Joe Chiccarelli and Saints of Valory.

== "Neon Eyes" ==
On July 24, 2013, the band premiered the music video for the single "Neon Eyes" on Billboard. The video was also featured on MTV's Buzzworthy.

== Members ==
Current

- Stephen Buckle (keyboards/vocals)
- Godfrey Thomson (guitar/vocals)
- Gavin Jasper (lead vocals/bass)

Former

Gerard Labou (drums)

== Discography ==
=== Albums ===
List of albums
Title	Album details
Bleeding Rainbows	Released: 2018

=== Extended plays ===
List of extended plays
Title	Album details
"The Bright Lights"	Released: November 2010; Label: Self-released; Formats: Digital download
"Kids EP"	Released: May 2012; Label: Self-released; Formats: Digital download
"Possibilities EP"	Released: 9 July 2013; Label: Atlantic Records; Formats: Digital download
"V"	Released: 19 May 2014; Label: Atlantic Records; Formats: CD, Digital download

== Singles ==
List of singles as lead artist, showing year released and album name
Title	Year	Album	Label
"Providence"	2010	The Bright Lights	Self-released
"Neon Eyes"	2013	Possibilities EP	Atlantic Records

== Guest appearances ==
List of non-single guest appearances, with other performing artists, showing year released, album name, and label
Title	Year	Other artist(s)	Album	Label
"Stay"	2016	Steve Angello	Wild Youth	Size Records
