= Godfrey (musician) =

American singer-songwriter

Godfrey Thomson
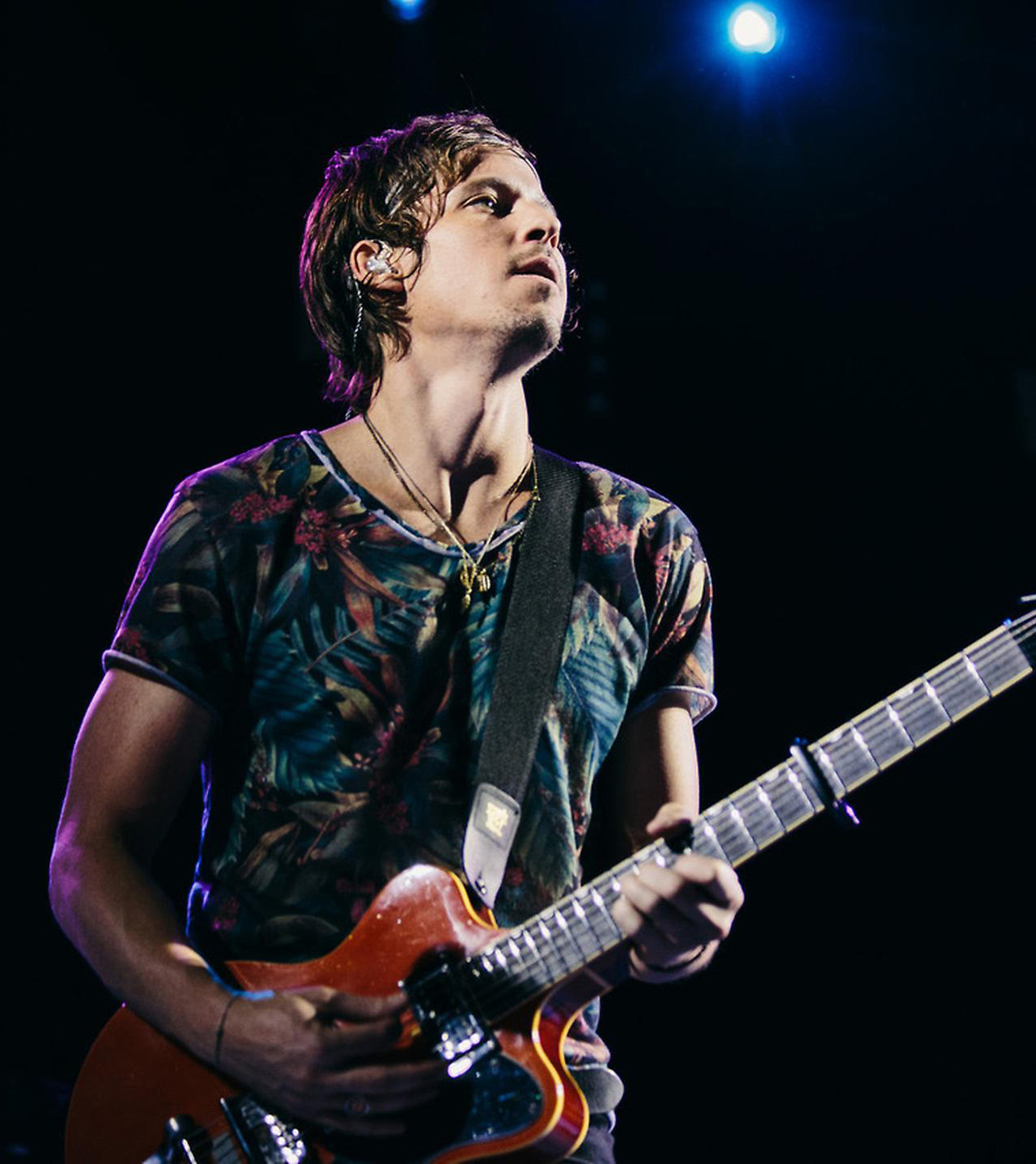
- Thomson at Red Rocks Amphitheatre September 2014

Background information
- Born: Godfrey James Thomson
- Origin: United States
- Genres: Alt-rock; indie pop; alt-dance
- Occupations: Record producer; singer; songwriter; audio engineer
- Instruments: Guitars; piano; keyboards; programming; vocals
- Years active: 2000–present
- Labels: Atlantic Records; Universal Music Publishing Group
- Website: godfreymusic.com

Godfrey James Thomson, better known as Godfrey, is an American singer-songwriter, recording artist and record producer based in Austin, Texas. He co-founded the alternative rock band, Saints of Valory, in 2008 where he is the lead guitarist and vocalist. With Saints of Valory, he has released 2 singles, 4 EPs and 1 full-length album. They were previously signed to Atlantic Records and Universal Music Publishing Group. Godfrey collaborated with Nitty Scott and released "Sugar Puss" his first single as a solo artist on March 27, 2020.

== Biography ==
=== Early life ===
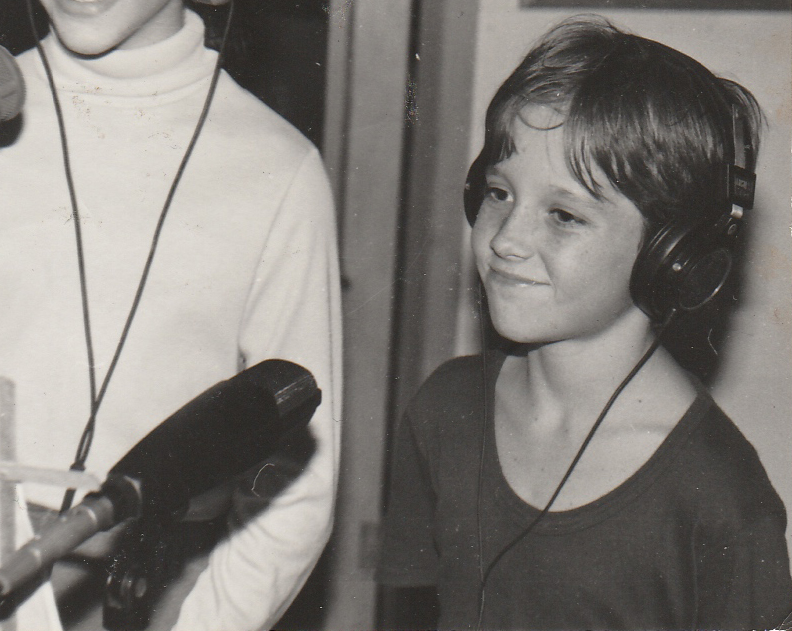
Godfrey Thomson voice acting • Rio de Janeiro, Brazil

Godfrey was born to American parents and moved to Brazil at 1 year of age. As a young child, he began performing and playing guitar in public. At the age of nine, Godfrey began recording vocals and voice acting in English, Spanish and Portuguese languages. At the age of 15, he moved to Los Angeles, CA with his family. During his teen years, Godfrey moved to Tokyo, Japan with a friend to pursue a career in audio/video engineering and music production.

=== Career ===
Godfrey returned to the US in his early 20's and began working as a record producer and audio engineer. In the early 2000s, he relocated to Mexico City where he built an audio recording studio and continued his record producing career. In 2008, Godfrey moved back to the United States and began composing music for television and film. He composed hard rock and alt-rock soundtracks for NBC Sports Channel and Outdoor Channel as well as for shows such as Cars.TV and The American Athlete.

In 2008, Godfrey and his childhood friend Gavin Jasper formed the alternative rock band, Saints of Valory in Rio de Janeiro, Brazil. Gerard Labou also visited Brazil and joined the band as the drummer. The band self-released their first EP, "The Bright Lights", in 2010. Saint of Valory was named one of Billboard's Top Unsigned Artists in 2012. Between 2010 and 2018, Godfrey's musical career continued as the co-founder and the lead guitarist of Saints Of Valory who were signed to Atlantic Records in 2012. They subsequently signed a publishing deal with Universal Music Publishing Group in 2014. During these times, Godfrey was voted top 10 guitarists in Austin, Texas for 2010–2011.

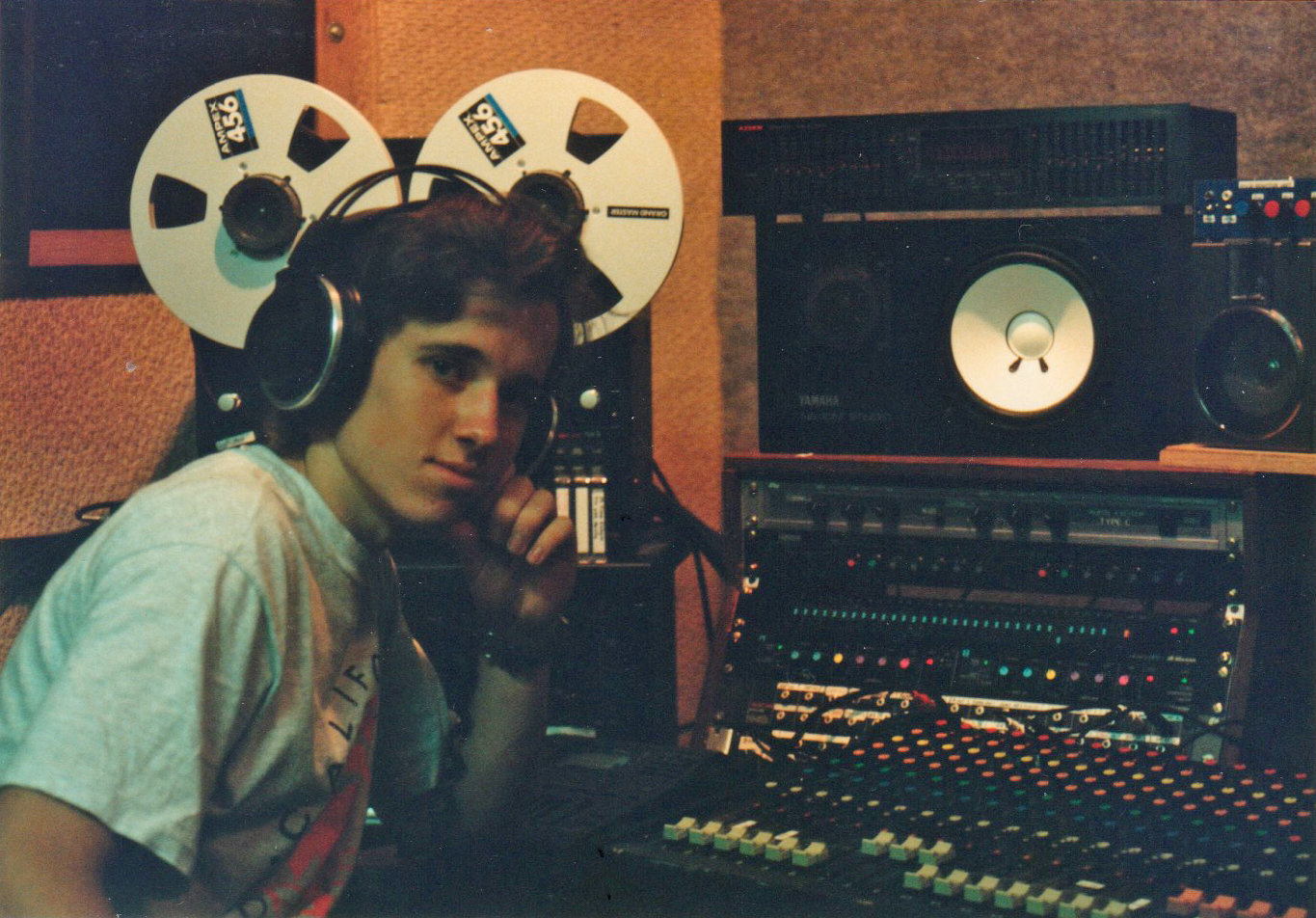
Thomson at audio engineering school • Tokyo, Japan

Godfrey's notable performances with Saints of Valory include supporting The Rolling Stones, One Republic at Red Rocks Amphitheatre, Imagine Dragons, Fitz and The Tantrums, AWOL Nation, Coachella Music Festival, Austin City Limits, Rock in Rio Brazil and Rock in Rio USA.

In March 2020, Godfrey released his first single as a solo artist called, "Sugar Puss" featuring Nitty Scott. The single received positive reviews at multiple music websites. On May 15, 2020, Godfrey released a second single, "Let Me." along with the instrumental version. He wrote his third single following the murder of George Floyd and subsequent protesting, "Hard Look (Mirror And Me)" was released on Juneteenth 2020.

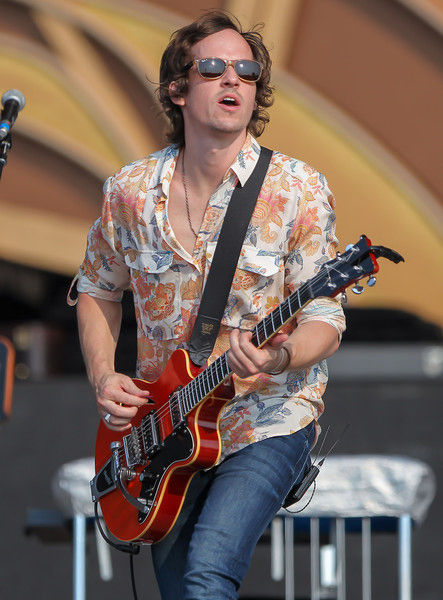
Godfrey Thomson supporting The Rolling Stones at the Indianapolis Motor Speedway • 4th of July, 2015

== Discography ==
As a solo artist
Singles	Year
"Sugar Puss (feat. Nitty Scott) [Raucous Mix]"	2020
"Let Me."	2020
"Hard Look (Mirror And Me)"	2020

With Saint of Valory
Title	Year	Type	Notes
"The Bright Lights"	2010	Extended Play	
"Providence"	2010	Single	
"Kids EP"	2012	Extended Play	
"Possibilities EP"	2013	Extended Play	Label: Atlantic Records
"Neon Eyes"	2013	Single	Label: Atlantic Records
"V"	2014	Extended Play	Label: Atlantic Records
Bleeding Rainbows	2018	Album	
