= Explosions (song) =

2013 single by Ellie Goulding

Single by Ellie Goulding

from the album Halcyon
- Released: 30 January 2013
- Recorded: 2012
- Studio: Splendido (Wales)
- Length: 4:03
- Label: Polydor
- Songwriters: Ellie Goulding; John Fortis
- Producer: John Fortis

Ellie Goulding singles chronology
"Figure 8" (2012)	"Explosions" (2013)	"I Need Your Love" (2013)

Music video
- "Explosions" on YouTube

"Explosions" is a song by English singer-songwriter Ellie Goulding from her second studio album, Halcyon (2012). Written by Goulding and John Fortis, it was released as a promotional single on iTunes Ireland on 3 August 2012 and on iTunes UK on 1 October 2012, but was removed shortly thereafter on both occasions. In late January 2013, it was announced that the track would be released as the official third single from the album. The official music video premiered on 30 January 2013 and consists of exclusive live footage of Goulding from the Halcyon Days Tour.

== Commercial performance ==
Following its use on ITV's "Where Drama Lives" advertisement, "Explosions" debuted at number 122 on the UK Singles Chart for the week ending 26 January 2013, jumping to number thirty-three the following week on sales of 9,851 copies. In its sixth week, the song rose to its peak position of number thirteen, selling 24,269 copies. The single had sold over 200,000 copies in the UK as of August 2013, and was certified silver by the British Phonographic Industry (BPI) on 20 September 2013.

"Explosions" entered the Billboard Hot 100 at number 100 on the issue dated 1 March 2014, following the song's use in television commercials for the American film Endless Love.

== Personnel ==
Credits adapted from the liner notes of Halcyon.

- Ellie Goulding – vocals
- Ben Baptie – mixing assistant
- Tom Elmhirst – mixing
- John Fortis – keyboards, production, programming
- Ashley Krajewski – additional programming, engineering
- Kirsty Mangan – violin
- George Murphy – engineering

== Charts ==
=== Weekly charts ===
Chart (2013–14)	Peak position
Euro Digital Song Sales (Billboard)	18
Ireland (IRMA)	51
Scottish Singles Sales (Official Charts)	16
Slovakia Airplay (ČNS IFPI)	95
UK Singles (Official Charts)	13
US Billboard Hot 100	100

=== Year-end charts ===
Chart (2013)	Position
UK Singles (Official Charts Company)	93

== Certifications ==
Region	Certification	Certified units/sales
United Kingdom (BPI)	Gold	400,000^{‡}
^{‡} Sales+streaming figures based on certification alone.
