= Human (Steve Angello album) =

Studio album by Steve Angello
- Released: 27 April 2018
- Genre: Progressive house; electro; synthwave
- Length: 91:17
- Label: Size
- Producer: Steve Angello

Steve Angello chronology
Wild Youth (2016)	Human (2018)

Singles from Human
- 1. "Breaking Kind" Released: 4 August 2017; 2. "Rejoice" Released: 4 August 2017; 3. "Freedom" Released: 13 October 2017; 4. "I Know" Released: 13 October 2017; 5. "Break Me Down" Released: 17 November 2017; 6. "Dopamine" Released: 17 November 2017; 7. "Nothing Scares Me Anymore" Released: 22 March 2018

Human is the second studio album by Swedish Greek DJ and producer Steve Angello, released on 27 April 2018 through Size Records. The album, which was debuted at Coachella 2017, was initially teased with the release of three separate EPs titled "Genesis", "Inferno", and "Paradiso" throughout 2017 and single "Nothing Scares Me Anymore" in 2018. According to Angello, Human is a concept album inspired by a trip to his hometown church in Stockholm during a period where he considered walking away from music, due to his dissatisfication with the constant chase for attention in the social media world.

== Background ==
After releasing Wild Youth in January 2016, Steve Angello announced on his final BBC Radio 1 Residency show in December 2016 that he will be putting out a new solo album in 2017, which he mentioned was "almost done". In his Coachella 2017 performance on April, Angello played multiple singles from the album, although no official release date was confirmed at that time. The album's release was postponed to the next year following Angello's Tweets on Twitter, where he announced a "100% chance" that the album was coming out ahead of 2018.

It wasn't that I was lost creatively. It was bigger than that. I've created music my whole life and I'm trying to cut through this noise all the time. I play the biggest shows in the world. I have the most success I could ever possibly have. What's next for me in life? Is this it? Should I just go and milk it and just make as much money as I can? Do I see it as a business, or do I actually go back to find myself, to become this 15-year-old kid that I was once and just create music for the passion and love I have with music? Or do I keep chasing my tail, try to do the hits one after one, just keep on releasing singles and push to stream?

—Steve Angello, regarding his future direction after Wild Youth

On 4 August 2017, Angello released the first installment of the album in a form of an EP titled Genesis containing singles "Breaking Kind" and "Rejoice". The theme of Genesis revolves around Christmas and gospel influences, based on Angello who commented that the EP was his "electronic church". The second installation of the album titled Inferno was released on 13 October 2017 consisting of tracks "Freedom" and "I Know".

In an interview with Billboard at the time of the EP's unveiling, Angello revealed that he began to question the future direction of his musical career after Wild Youth's release. Angello, aware of his career success, was unsure if he should continue producing music with passion or to take his music as a business by constantly releasing singles to increase his financial wealth. At that time, Angello was actively using Instagram to promote his album, and spent a lot of his time studying market research to maximise his "likes" and streaming presence rather than focusing on his creative potential. Eventually, he thought of successful music artists including Michael Jackson and Pink Floyd who lacked online presence, but managed to bring in fresh musical concepts after touring.

Angello then decided to delete his social media and retreated to his hometown Stockholm to focus on his family. While on his way to the studio one day, Angello stopped by at a closed Orthodox church and meditated at the pews; repeating this practice daily. Angello also listened to many inspirational speeches, and stumbled upon a sermon from West Virginia pastor T. D. Jakes who was motivating his congregation to change their lives for the new year. This struck as inspirational to Angello and he reached out to the church for an audio file of Jakes' sermon, which was later used in his track "Rejoice" as a feature and was the first track produced in his new state of mind.

Paradiso, the third and final installation, was released on 17 November 2017. The EP represented the "bright light at the end of the tunnel" in stark contrast to Genesis and Inferno which symbolised restarting again and the dark, sensual elements of life respectively, and contained tracks "Break Me Down" and "Dopamine".

Musically, Angello commented that he was being a "kid" again, creating music which was honest and in his own way of speech. He revealed that in the making of "Rejoice", Angello entered a destruction phase where he stood "naked and honest all alone" to search for higher powers, which became the orthodox church. He asked himself, "What happens after the future? What are we going to believe in and how does that look and feel? Can it work by design?", and upon receiving the answers in the form of biblical references Angello started to write the track.

== Release and promotion ==
On 19 February 2018, Angello shared snippets of his album through Instagram which featured him listening to a cassette tape, with the tape marked "STEVE ANGELLO | HUMAN 2018". On 5 March 2018, the album's release date was hinted through a picture posted by Angello and Size Records on Instagram which showed a mass of shredded paper with a cryptic message on it.

Upon the album's release, Angello commented, "Human is a concept album that I love. No compromise, unfiltered, and straight to the point. It was rewarding to be able to express this piece of me. After months of disconnect I felt I had to change the way I made music, change the way I thought of music and the way I felt about music."

To promote the album, a "Lifetime Pass" presented in a credit card form was introduced on 1 May 2018. The pass will allow free access to all of the producer’s live solo shows, meet and greets, and backstage access for one's lifetime.

== Critical reception ==
Professional ratings
Review scores
Source	Rating
Exclaim!	7/10

Kat Bein of Billboard wrote that the record "moves from haunting cinematics to gritty electro and feel-good dance rhythms", thus "showcasing the producer's versatility and willingness to experiment". Dylan Barnabe from Exclaim! describes Human as a "rousing sermon brought to life with fiery synth" that was "best encapsulated" by single "Rejoice". The critic felt that although the album was "overtly biblical in some respects", it still "extends beyond any religious undertones to highlight Angello's own journey to enlightenment" where Angello "dig deep and experiment with new styles and forms of musical expression". Karlie Powell from Your EDM found that "heavy synth work, gospel choirs, eerie vibrations and bass-heavy undertones narrate the album throughout" which tells of Angello's "life-changing experience deliberately and thrillingly from the most intense of builds down to the most delicate notes".

== Track listing ==
Credits adapted from Tidal. All tracks produced by Steve Angello.

No.	Title	Writer(s)	Length
1.	"Rejoice" (featuring T. D. Jakes)	Steve Patrik Angello Josefsson Fragogiannis	7:34
2.	"Breaking Kind" (featuring Paul Meany)	Angello	3:20
3.	"Flashing Lights" (featuring Highly Sedated)	Angello	3:34
4.	"Glory"	Angello	3:35
5.	"Grace"	Angello	4:50
6.	"Are You" (featuring WDL)	Angello; Johan Wedel; Nadia Johansson	3:45
7.	"21:"	Angello	2:49
8.	"Lord"	Angello	5:34
9.	"Wanna"	Angello	3:17
10.	"The Kiss"	Angello	4:03
11.	"God"	Angello	4:28
12.	"I Know"	Angello	3:45
13.	"Freedom" (featuring Pusha T)	Angello; Terrence Thornton	3:42
14.	"Fire"	Angello	3:46
15.	"Heroes"	Angello	4:35
16.	"Shifter"	Angello	6:11
17.	"Paradiso"	Angello	5:08
18.	"Dopamine" (featuring Barns Courtney)	Angello; Barnaby George Courtney; Seton Daunt; Halima Daunt	5:20
19.	"Break Me Down"	Angello; John Stephen Sudduth; Nicholas Oliver Ruth	3:57
20.	"Eros"	Angello	4:07
21.	"Nothing Scares Me Anymore" (with Sam Martin)	Angello	3:57
Total length:			91:17

== Charts ==
Chart (2018)	Peak position
Belgian Albums (Ultratop Flanders)	167
