= Wild Youth (album) =

Studio album by Steve Angello
- Released: 22 January 2016
- Recorded: 2013–2016
- Genre: Progressive house; electronic rock; indietronica; drumstep; retrowave; ambient house
- Length: 62:55
- Label: Size
- Producer: Steve Angello; AN21; Stuart Price; Tom Taped; Francesco Rossi; Saturday, Monday

Steve Angello chronology
Decade (2014)	Wild Youth (2016)	Human (2018)

Singles from Wild Youth
- 1. "Wasted Love" Released: 22 July 2014; 2. "Children of the Wild" Released: 1 July 2015; 3. "Remember" Released: 1 November 2015; 4. "Tiger" Released: 20 November 2015; 5. "The Ocean" Released: 20 November 2015; 6. "Prisoner" Released: 20 November 2015

Wild Youth is the debut studio album by Swedish DJ and music producer Steve Angello. It was released worldwide on 22 January 2016 via Size Records. The album features collaborations with the vocalists: Alex Aris, Andrew Watt, Dan Reynolds of Imagine Dragons, David Garza, Dougy of The Temper Trap, Franz Novotny, Gary Go, and Julia Spada; DJs: An21, Francesco Rossi, Saturday, Monday and Tom Taped; and the groups: Mako, Saints of Valory and The Presets.

The album includes the singles "Wasted Love", "Children of the Wild", "Remember", "Tiger", "The Ocean", and "Prisoner".

Steve Angello has referred to Wild Youth as "the soundtrack of his life" in a recent statement of his; where he also stated about the album, "it's based on a true story—honest, naked and the most exposed I've ever been."

"Wild Youth" received mixed responses from critics.

== Background ==
According to Steve Angello, "Tiger", the fourth single and third track on the album, generated Angello's series of creative artworks, and subsequently induced the decision to record a full-length studio album; where Angello noted in an interview with Entertainment Weekly, "[it] was the first song I made for the album, along with the overall concept of the album. It was the mood color and creativity behind the start." Songwriting for the album's tracks began while Angello was engaged in the One Last Tour with progressive house and EDM supergroup, Swedish House Mafia. The recording process began in 2013, shortly after the aforementioned tour had ended, marking the split of Swedish House Mafia. The album was originally signed to Columbia Records, but after differences between Angello and Columbia were conceived, "in order to make an album of his unique vision", Angello bought himself out of the major label contract, along with reclaiming the rights to the album. With the exception of "Wasted Love", being signed to Columbia Records, the rest of the album and its singles were then signed to Size Records, Steve Angello's own record label. During an interview with Web Summit, alongside Radiohead manager Brian Message, Angello seized the opportunity to announce that his album would be split into two chapters, with chapter one containing half of the full album's tracks, stating that it would be "more interesting for me (Angello), and the fans, because they can be a part of it; and if you're trying to tell a story with an album today, you need their attention." The first chapter of the album was made available for digital download via iTunes on 20 November 2015. It included six tracks: "Children of the Wild", "Tiger", "Wasted Love", "The Ocean", "Prisoner", and "Remember". Soon after chapter one's release, Angello admitted that an earlier version of the album was complete a year and a half ago, but due to dissatisfaction, he scrapped almost half of the album and started over. The second chapter, and ultimately, the full album was released on 22 January 2016. It included seven new tracks: "Rebel Nation", "Last Dance", "Revolution", "Stockholm Skies", "Someone Else", "Stay", and "....", a monologue from Steve Angello himself. The album also included all of the tracks from chapter one.

In an interview with Swedish daily, Dagens Nyheter, Angello said that his album shows a clear story from the day he was born to his upbringing and teen years in depression, after the murder of his father, when Angello was fourteen. He also mentioned how some of the tracks on the album are about his father, but more specifically track three and forward.

== Singles ==
"Wasted Love" was released as the album's lead single on 22 July 2014, featuring Indonesian singer-songwriter, Dougy from Australian indie group, The Temper Trap. The song peaked at number nine on the Billboard Hot Dance Club Songs chart, and number fifty-two in Sweden.

"Children Of The Wild" was released as the album's second single on 1 July 2015, featuring American electronic duo, Mako. All of the song's pre-sales in the month of June, along with 100% of its streaming revenue on Spotify, went towards the Save The Children organization, and their Nepal Disaster Relief fund.

"Remember" was released as the album's third single on 1 November 2015, featuring Australian duo, The Presets. The song peaked at number twenty-five on the Ultratop Flanders chart, and number twenty-six on the Ultratop Wallonia chart.

"Tiger" was released as the album's fourth single on 20 November 2015 via Beatport.

"The Ocean" was released as the album's fifth single on 20 November 2015, with additional credits given to the original artists of the song: Saturday, Monday and Julia Spada. The accompanying music video for the song features Swedish MMA fighter, Ilir Latifi.

"Prisoner" was released as the album's sixth and final single on 20 November 2015, featuring singer-songwriter, Gary Go.

== Critical reception ==
Professional ratings
Review scores
Source	Rating
Billboard	2.5/5 stars
Music Is My Oxygen	2.5/5 stars
Renowned for Sound	3.5/5 stars
Rolling Stone	3/5 stars
We Got This Covered	4.5/5 stars

Wild Youth received generally mixed reviews from music critics. John Cameron of We Got This Covered referred to the album as "fantastic", stating, "with one minor exception, chapter two (full album) of Steve Angello's Wild Youth manages to build on what he accomplished in chapter one." Ashley Zlatopolsky of Rolling Stone opined, "Wild Youth is a reminder that Angello is a solo dance force to take seriously." Michael Smith of Renowned for Sound felt that the album's "weakest moments" came from the first half of the album, but nevertheless concluded that "there's a lot of impressive material to experience" on the album. Marcus K. Dowling of Insomniac stated, "overall, Wild Youth is an off-kilter listen at first". However, Dowling concluded that the album was "worthy of multiple listens", and that the album was "an audacious release that aims for something more, and eventually finds all of it." The album did not receive any reviews on AllMusic, but did receive positive ratings.

In a review Jody Rosen wrote for Billboard, Rosen was unimpressed with the album, claiming that its songs "may not translate to the dancefloor". He culminated the review saying, "The truth is, Angello's storytelling and ruminating leave much to be desired." Music Is My Oxygen's Jon O'Brien complimented the tracks "Revolution" and "The Ocean", but despite that, referred to the album as "unadventurous, generic and largely forgettable", while he ultimately concluded, "In contrast to Steve Angello's misguided claims, it (Wild Youth) certainly won't spearhead a dance music revolution."

== Artwork ==
Photo of Steve Angello at the Wild Youth art gallery exhibit.

The art featured on Wild Youth, and its singles, revolve around a collection of ceramic pieces. Each ceramic piece has the figure of a different object, such as: a ninja star, ("Wasted Love"), a heart, ("Remember") and a baseball bat ("Tiger"). Within those ceramic pieces, are handmade decorations and unique patterns, which are painted in the colour blue. This style of art dates back from a Swedish tradition known since the 1400s. In an interview, Angello discussed the meaning behind his art, where he acknowledged his "rough childhood". According to Angello, the use of ceramic is a reference to people, and how their hard beginnings can make them hard people overall, though "the problem is that you're still a kid, and you're super fragile" like ceramic.

For New York fashion week, Angello announced that he would open up a gallery exhibit for the art featured on Wild Youth. On 11 February 2016, the exhibit was held privately, where Angello displayed the aforementioned art, and also premiered the official video for "Tiger". The Wild Youth gallery exhibit was held at Art Director's Club INC on (106 w. 29th st.), and was open to the public from 12pm through 8pm, from 12 February to 14 February. The Wild Youth gallery exhibit also featured Angello's fashion collaboration with Odeur Studios, a line of unisex and children's clothing items. Angello culminated the event with a show at Highline Ballroom on 14 February at 10pm on (431 W. 16th st.)

== Track listing ==
No.	Title	Writer(s)	Producer(s)	Length
1.	"Rebel Nation" (featuring Andrew Watt)	Watt; Steve Angello	Angello	4:25
2.	"Children of the Wild" (featuring Mako)	Angello; Logan Light; Alex Seaver	Angello; Mako	4:06
3.	"Tiger"	Angello	Angello	2:48
4.	"Last Dance" (with AN21 featuring Franz Novotny)	Novotny; An21; Angello	An21; Angello	4:20
5.	"Wasted Love" (featuring Dougy)	Dougy; Carl Falk; Joakim Berg; Angello; Stuart Price	Angello; Price; Fawcus; Falk	5:44
6.	"Stockholm Skies" (with Tom Taped featuring Alex Aris)	Alexander Ryberg; Tom Liljegren; Angello	Taped; Angello	4:33
7.	"Revolution" (with Francesco Rossi featuring David Garza)	Garza; Angello; Rossi	Rossi; Angello	5:29
8.	"Prisoner" (featuring Gary Go)	Gary Go; Angello	Angello	5:05
9.	"The Ocean" (with Saturday, Monday featuring Julia Spada)	Spada; Saturday, Monday; Angello	Angello; Saturday, Monday	7:07
10.	"Someone Else" (featuring Dan Reynolds)	Reynolds; Angello	Angello	5:03
11.	"Remember" (featuring The Presets)	Julian Hamilton; Kimberley Moyes; Angello	Angello	5:34
12.	"Stay" (featuring Saints of Valory)	Gavin Jesper; Godfrey Thomson; Stephen Buckle; Angello; Gerard Labou	Angello	5:24
13.	"...."	Angello	Angello	3:18

Notes

- ^{^a} signifies an additional producer
- "The Ocean" is a remix of the 2013 song of the same name by Swedish music producer Saturday, Monday and singer-songwriter, Julia Spada.

== Charts ==
Chart (2016)	Peak position
Belgian Albums (Ultratop Wallonia)	90
Italian Albums (FIMI)	94
Spanish Albums (PROMUSICAE)	96
Swedish Albums (Sverigetopplistan)	20
US Top Dance/Electronic Albums (Billboard)	4

== Release history ==
Region	Date	Format	Label	Ref.
Various	20 November 2015	digital download	Size	
Various	22 January 2016	digital download	Size	
