= Tiger (Steve Angello song) =

Single by Steve Angello

from the album Wild Youth
- Released: 20 November 2015
- Recorded: 2013
- Genre: Drumstep; retrowave
- Length: 2:48
- Label: Size Records
- Songwriter: Steve Angello
- Producer: Steve Angello

Steve Angello singles chronology
"Remember" (2015)	"Tiger" (2015)	"The Ocean" (2015)

"Tiger" is a song recorded by Greek-Swedish DJ and music producer Steve Angello for his debut studio album, "Wild Youth". The song was released as the fourth single from the album on 20 November 2015.

== Background ==
According to Steve Angello, "Tiger" was produced early into the recording process of his album, "Wild Youth," and guided the decision to record the aforementioned work. In an interview with Entertainment Weekly, Angello said, "[it] was the first song that I made for the album, along with the overall concept of the album. It was the mood color and creativity behind the start." Angello went on to say, "usually I create video concepts and art works before I actually work on the songs. I need a clear concept of the songs before I finalize it. This was created side-by-side and therefore the song had remained instrumental."

== Critical reception ==
The song received positive reviews. Aupium claimed that the song is "definitely not a chill track, but a euphonious jolt you need for work mode... or run-for-your-life one." AusPop opined, "the beats here are perhaps a little less frenetic than those of his works with the trio, but they're dirtier, fiercer and a little darker." Madison Vain of Entertainment Weekly said, "the brooding, expansive song sits heavy on your chest — and the video matches."

== Music video ==
The official music video, directed by Fredrik Hvass, is five minutes and twenty-one seconds long, much longer in length than the song itself. Steve Angello premiered the music video at the opening of his art gallery exhibit for his album Wild Youth, on 11 February 2016. A day later, the music video was uploaded to Steve Angello's YouTube and VEVO account.

Shot in Sweden, the gritty, PG-13 rated music video is centered around a group of forest dwellers dressed in white robes running from an anonymous group of people dressed in black robes. While one of the forest dwellers helps another forest dweller who's been wounded get to safety, many of the other forest dwellers are seen being choked and brutally beaten to death by the anonymous group of people.

Ryan Middleton of Music Times commented about the music video saying, "dramatic and gripping, the video for the third track on the album "Tiger" is another powerful piece of powerful visuals by the Swedish DJ (Angello)."

== Track listing ==
Digital download
No.	Title	Length
1.	"Tiger"	2:48
