= Halcyon (Ellie Goulding album) =

- Standard cover

Studio album by Ellie Goulding
- Released: 5 October 2012
- Studios: Splendido (Wales); The Ballroom (London); Red Rhino (Montreal); Starsmith HQ (UK); Air (London); EMI (London); Fly Eye (London); Biffco (Brighton); Troublemakers (Montreal); Strongroom (London); Sarm (London)
- Genres: Electropop; pop
- Length: 46:54
- Label: Polydor
- Producers: Billboard; Burns; Jim Eliot; John Fortis; DJ Fresh; Ellie Goulding; Calvin Harris; Greg Kurstin; Madeon; Monsta; Justin Parker; Fraser T. Smith; Starsmith; Xaphoon Jones

Ellie Goulding chronology
Bright Lights (2010)	Halcyon (2012)	Halcyon Days (2013)

Singles from Halcyon
- 1. "Anything Could Happen" Released: 17 August 2012; 2. "Figure 8" Released: 14 December 2012; 3. "Explosions" Released: 30 January 2013

Halcyon is the second studio album by English singer-songwriter Ellie Goulding, released on 5 October 2012, by Polydor Records. It was recorded at multiple studios across the United Kingdom and Canada, including locations in Wales, London, Brighton, and Montreal. She worked with several producers on the album, such as Jim Eliot, Starsmith, Billboard, Justin Parker, and Monsta, in addition to collaborating with artists Tinie Tempah and Calvin Harris.

Halcyon is a pop and electropop album that expands on the electronic foundations of Goulding's debut studio album, Lights (2010), through influences from synth-pop, electronica, R&B, and EDM. Characterized by synthesiser-driven production, layered vocal arrangements, piano, and percussion, the album features Goulding's breathy vocals across lower-register and falsetto passages. Its lyrics were shaped by a period of personal transition and explore themes of heartbreak, love, desire, longing, and emotional vulnerability.

Music critics provided generally positive reviews for Halcyon, complimenting Goulding's more aggressive showcase of her voice and the album's bold production. The album debuted at number two on the UK Albums Chart, selling 33,425 copies in its first week. In January 2014, it topped the UK Albums Chart and gave Goulding her second number-one album. Halcyon also debuted at number nine on the Billboard 200 in the United States, while reaching number one in Ireland, the top five in New Zealand, and the top 10 in Canada, Germany, and Switzerland.

"Anything Could Happen" was released as the lead single from Halcyon, peaking at number five on the UK Singles Chart. The second single, "Figure 8", reached number 33 on the chart and seven on the New Zealand Singles Chart, while the third single "Explosions" peaked at number 13 in the UK. To further promote the album, Goulding embarked on a nine-day promotional tour across the United Kingdom. Titled the Halcyon Days Tour, it was unveiled along with North American dates, beginning in Miami Beach, Florida. The album was reissued twice in 2013 and 2022, as Halcyon Days and Halcyon Nights, respectively.

== Background ==
After signing a recording deal with Polydor Records in July 2009, Goulding's debut studio album, Lights (2010), met generally positive reviews from music critics. The album debuted at number one on the UK Albums Chart, having since sold 807,000 copies in the United Kingdom and 1.6 million copies worldwide. In April 2012, Goulding stated that she hoped her then upcoming second studio album would be released in October.

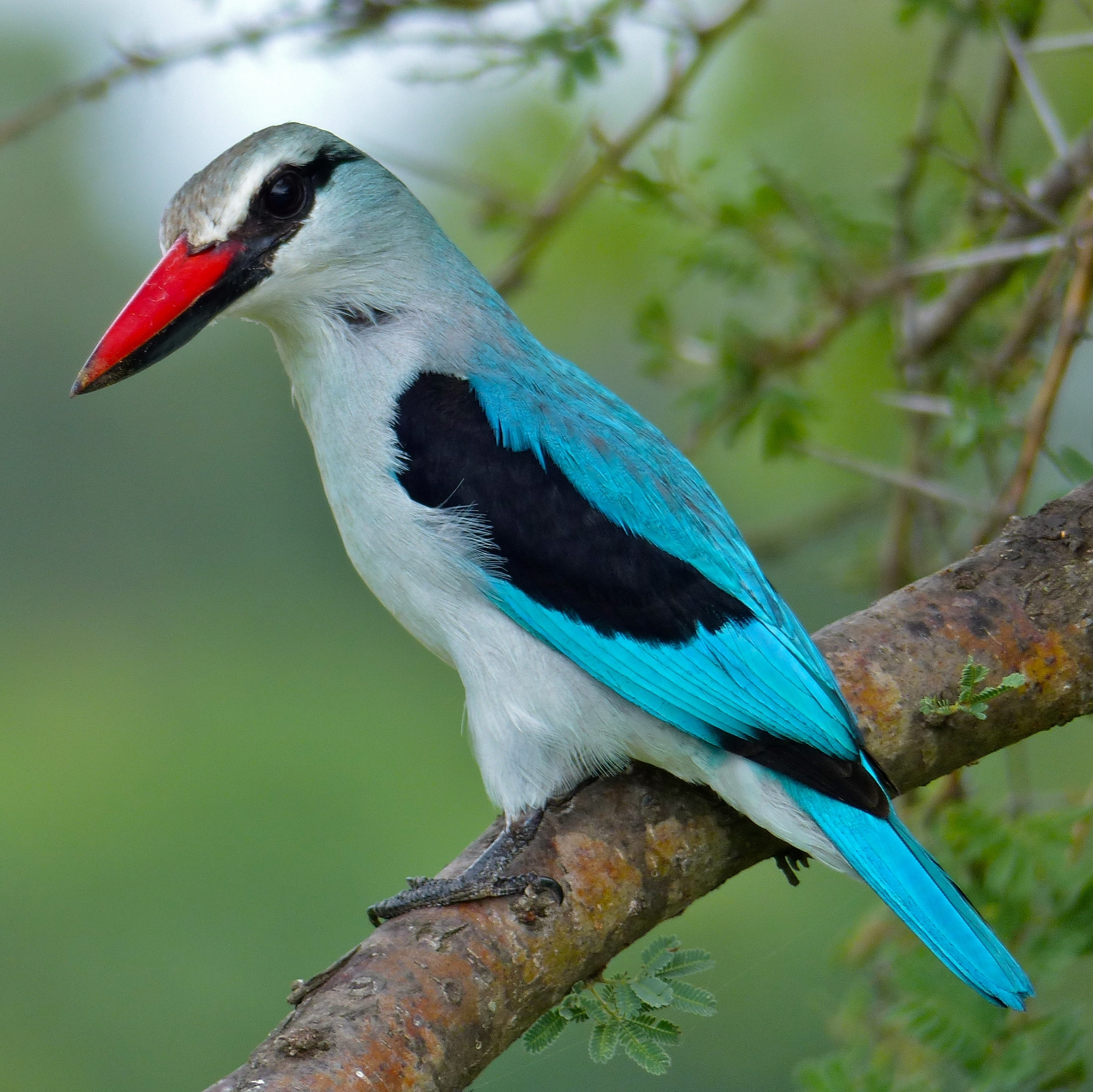
A kingfisher (Halcyon), which inspired the album's title

Goulding had stated that Halcyon did not begin as a break-up record, but later evolved into one. She detailed this in an interview with The New York Times; although Goulding had already begun writing songs for the album, she said that it "came alive" following the end of a relationship, when she felt "lost and all over the place". Goulding later wrote "Anything Could Happen" after beginning a new relationship, which she said marked another turning point in her life. Speaking with Carson Daly on his 97.1 AMP Radio show on 6 August 2012, Goulding explained the inspiration behind the album's title: "[Halcyon is] like a bird that basically during the winter, it would lay its eggs by the sea and bring calm to the stormy waters and a lot of my songs on this record are about the ocean and water." In retrospect, Goulding described the record in 2015 as "very self-indulgent", stating: "It was all me, every single lyric on the album."

== Composition ==
In March 2011, Goulding described Halcyon as sounding "very dark and very weird", and added that she wanted the album to remain hopeful despite its emotional themes. She later depicted it as a journey "from dark into light" and stated to MTV News that Halcyon reflected her personal growth as well as expanded musical influences since her debut, Lights. Goulding also described Halcyon's sound as more "tribal and anthemic" with a greater emphasis on piano and vocals, considering it "very electronic" and more pop-oriented than Lights.

Halcyon is an electropop and pop album, incorporating elements of techno, synth-pop, electro-soul, electronica, R&B, dance-pop, EDM, and rock. (Note: Per multiple sources) Throughout the album, her vocals shift between lower-register passages and falsetto delivery. Halcyon's production incorporates synthesiser-based production, reverb-heavy choir vocals, and club-oriented rhythms. Compared to Lights, it places greater emphasis on electronic production while maintaining Goulding's singer-songwriter lyricism and reflecting a more ambitious approach to her overall sound. Goulding's prominent vocals are also featured on the album, alongside piano flourishes, and forceful percussion, while its lyrics explore themes of love, longing, desire, and emotional vulnerability. Entertainment Weekly author Melissa Maerz and USA Today's Jerry Shriver noted Halcyon's features like harp passages, vibrato-driven vocal performances, and processed vocal harmonies.

=== Songs ===
The opening track, "Don't Say a Word", is an electronic song, featuring Goulding's ethereal vocals and a repetitive lyrical structure. She cited "My Blood" as a favourite from the album and explained that it was about someone taking so much from her emotionally that she felt she had "nothing left". Critics believed that it echos the vocals of English singer Adele. "Anything Could Happen" is an electro ballad that adopts staccato piano arrangements and club beats. The fourth track "Only You" is built around glittering synthesisers and soul vocal loops, while its lyrics depict the intertwined feelings of love and heartbreak. An electronic song, the title track combines ballad influences and gradually shifts toward a more dance-oriented sound in its chorus and closing passage. "Figure 8" is an electro-rock song that combines harp instrumentation with dubstep-influenced production.

"Joy" has a more restrained arrangements than much of the album. BBC Music's Ben Hewitt described the track as a "string-laden affair that showcases her helium-powered pipes". The next song, "Hanging On", is a goth-driven disco track, rendition of the Active Child's 2011 song of the same name. "Explosions" showcases a subdued side of Goulding's sound through its string-led arrangement, piano accompaniment, and dramatic percussion. The tenth track on the album, "I Know You Care", explores attempts to preserve a deteriorating relationship and maintain hope for reconciliation. "Atlantis" is a break-up song that explores moving on while struggling with lingering feelings after the end of a relationship. "Dead in the Water" is a piano- and string-led ballad whose lyrics explore heartbreak and despair. The song's arrangement gradually builds through the addition of percussion and choir-backed vocals.

== Release and promotion ==
=== Recording and marketing ===
The majority of the tracks on Halcyon were recorded with English producer Jim Eliot of Kish Mauve in a converted barn near Lyonshall, Herefordshire, the village where Goulding grew up. Recording sessions for the album also took place in Wales (Splendido), London (The Ballroom, Air, EMI, Fly Eye, Strongroom, and Sarm) Montreal (Red Rhino and Troublemakers), and Brighton (Biffco).

Goulding previewed Halcyon with the release of a cover version of the Active Child's "Hanging On", which features English rapper Tinie Tempah, as a free download on her SoundCloud page on 10 July 2012. On 3 August, Goulding released a trailer on YouTube containing snippets of tracks from the album, including "Anything Could Happen". Six days later, Goulding appeared on Fearne Cotton's BBC Radio 1 show for the premiere of "Anything Could Happen". A video for the song "I Know You Care" was released online on 24 September, containing footage from the 2012 romantic drama film, Now Is Good, which features the track. It was released digitally on 20 September 2013, in support of Save the Children's #song4syria campaign, serving as the soundtrack to a film dedicated to the children of Syria by director Beeban Kidron. A 90-second music video for "Only You" was exclusively filmed for online fashion retailer ASOS as part of their #BestNightEver holiday campaign, being released on 5 November 2012.

=== Live performances and usage in media ===
In conjunction with British music retailer HMV, fans had the chance to vote for Goulding to perform live and sign copies of Halcyon at their local store on the day of the album's UK release on 8 October 2012; it was announced on 20 September that the event would take place at Manchester's Market Street store. Goulding played two London shows prior to the release of Halcyon—the first on 26 September as part of the iTunes Festival at the Roundhouse, which was streamed live via an iTunes application, and the second on 5 October as part of the Q Awards 2012 gigs series at Camden Town's Jazz Café. Goulding also played three intimate shows in North America during the release week of Halcyon—at New York City's Santos Party House on 11 October, at Toronto's Sound Academy on 14 October and at Los Angeles's the Troubadour on 16 October.

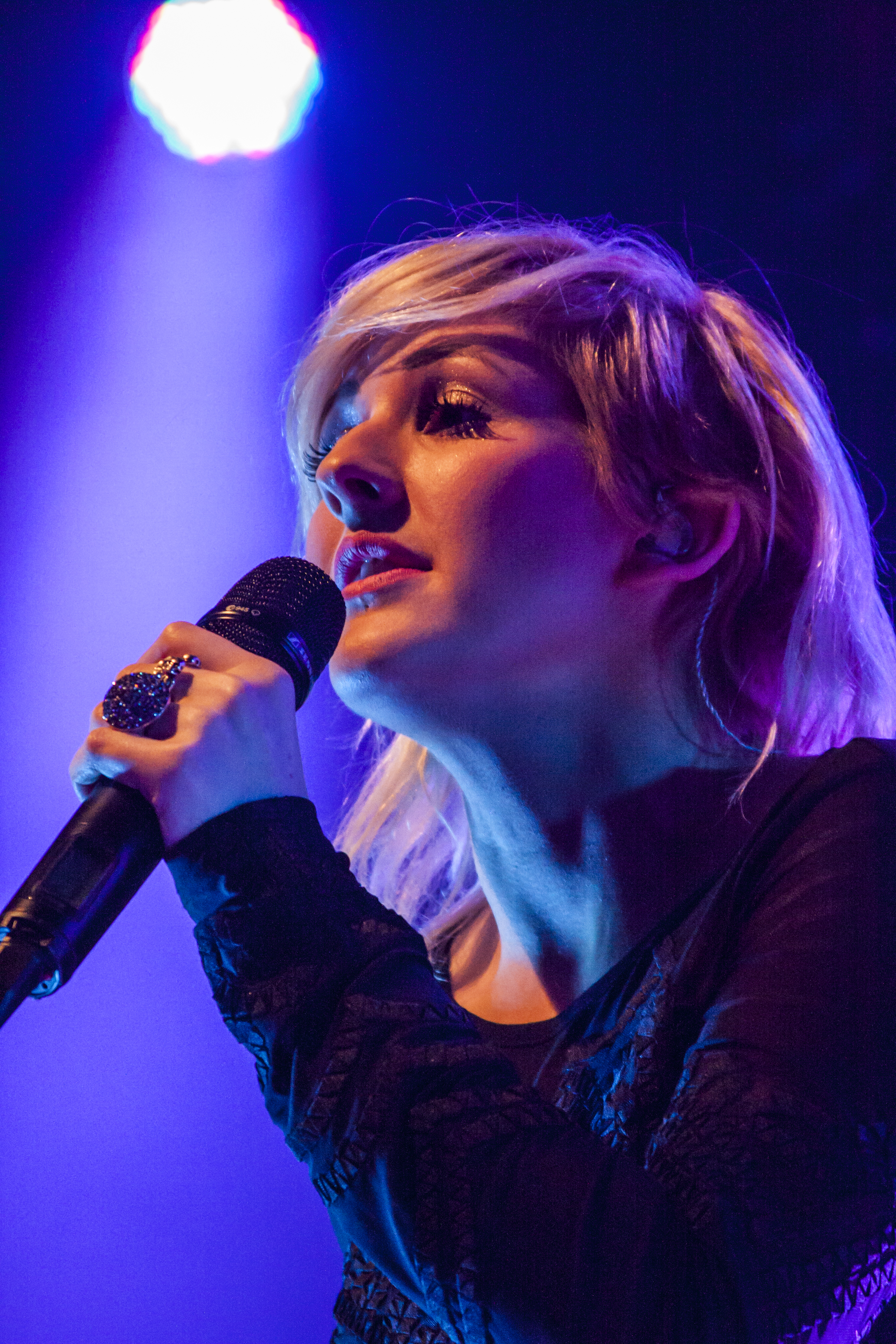
Goulding in December 2012, performing at the Manchester Academy

Goulding performed "Anything Could Happen" on Late Night with Jimmy Fallon on 10 October 2012, Today on 11 October, The Ellen DeGeneres Show and Conan on 17 October, Top of the Pops on 31 December, Good Morning America on 22 January 2013, and Jimmy Kimmel Live! on 12 February. She also performed "My Blood" on Later... with Jools Holland (16 November 2012), "Figure 8" on the British chat show Sunday Brunch (30 December), and "Explosions" on the British television programme This Morning (22 February 2013). On 14 December, Goulding performed "Anything Could Happen" on The X Factor UK final with finalist Luke Friend.

"Hanging On" was used in the CW shows—Gossip Girl and Nikita—in addition to the film Divergent (2014) and soundtrack to The Host (2013). The song's Living Phantoms remix was featured in a trailer for the 2013 PlayStation 3 video game God of War: Ascension. "Dead in the Water" was featured on the 15th episode of the ninth season of the American Broadcasting Company medical drama Grey's Anatomy on 14 February. On 15 April, an exclusive album containing remixes of tracks from Halcyon was released by Nike for free streaming and download to coincide with the Nike Women Half Marathon that Goulding would be partaking in, which took place in Washington, D.C., on 28 April. "My Blood" was included in the deluxe edition of the Divergent soundtrack, in addition to appearing in the trailer for Disney's live-action version of Cinderella (2015).

=== Singles ===
In late July 2012, Goulding announced on Facebook that the lead single would be "Anything Could Happen", asking fans to contribute to a lyric video for the single by submitting photos related to the song's lyrics via Instagram. The lyric video premiered on YouTube on 9 August, and was followed by the release of the single via all digital retailers on 17 August. "Anything Could Happen" reached number five on the UK Singles Chart, becoming Goulding's third top-five entry in the UK, while peaking at number 47 on the US Billboard Hot 100. The single charted moderately worldwide, reaching the top 20 in Australia, Ireland, and New Zealand, and the top 40 in Belgium and Canada. (Note: Chart positions for Australia, Ireland, New Zealand, Belgium, and Canada)

"Figure 8" was released as the album's second single on 13 December 2012, peaking at number 33 on the UK Singles Chart. Although failing to enter the Billboard Hot 100, the song was more commercially successful in New Zealand and Finland, where it reached numbers seven and eight, respectively. "Explosions" was released on iTunes in Ireland on 3 August and in the UK on 1 October. In late January 2013, the song was confirmed to be the album's third single. It reached number 13 on the UK Singles Chart and number 100 on the Billboard Hot 100.

=== Tour ===
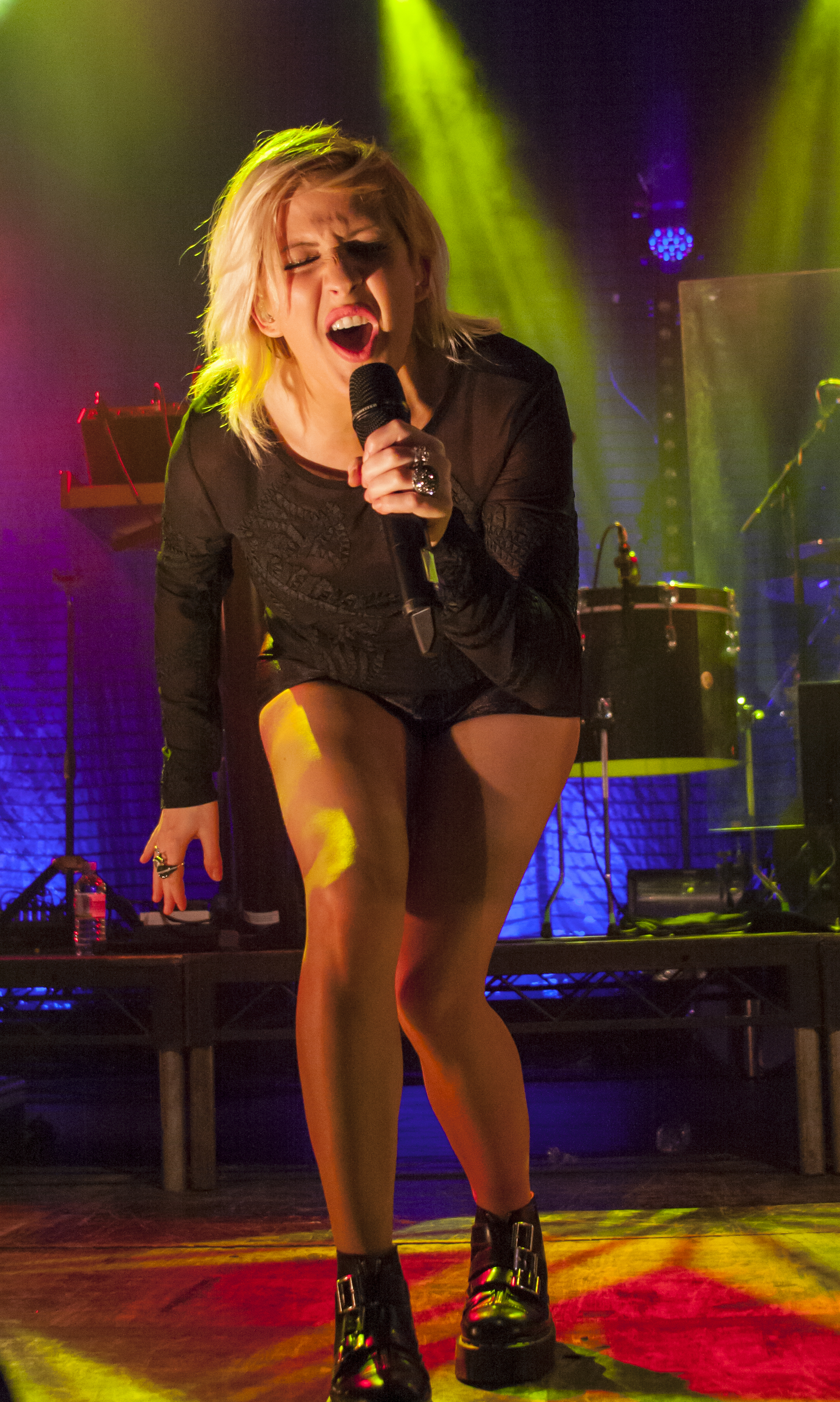
Goulding performing at Manchester Academy in December 2012, during the Halcyon Days Tour

On 7 December 2012, Goulding embarked on a nine-date promotional tour across the United Kingdom, which kicked off in Bristol and ended in Southampton on 18 December. The Halcyon Days Tour was unveiled on 22 October along with North American dates, beginning in Miami Beach, Florida, on 16 January 2013. Additional European dates followed on 15 November 2012. Opening acts included Yasmin and Sons & Lovers for the UK, St. Lucia for North America, and Charli XCX for Europe.

Additional ten UK dates started at O_{2} Academy Sheffield on 3 October and ended at O_{2} Apollo Manchester on 18 October 2013. Following the tour, it was announced on 27 August that she would headline her first UK arena tour in early March 2014, with shows at Capital FM Arena Nottingham, Echo Arena Liverpool, and London's O_{2} Arena.

== Critical reception ==
Professional ratings
Aggregate scores
Source	Rating
Metacritic	69/100
Review scores
Source	Rating
AllMusic	4.5/5 stars
The Daily Telegraph	4/5 stars
Entertainment Weekly	B+
The Guardian	3/5 stars
The Independent	3/5 stars
Los Angeles Times	3/4 stars
NME	5/10
Pitchfork	6.6/10
Rolling Stone	3.5/5 stars
USA Today	3/4 stars

Halcyon received generally positive reviews from music critics. At Metacritic, which assigns a normalised rating out of 100 to reviews from mainstream publications, the album received an average score of 69, based on 17 reviews.

Writing for The Daily Telegraph, Neil McCormick praised Goulding's vocals and compared Halcyon's sound to a combination of Enya's "luxuriously epic" style and the dynamism of Florence + the Machine. He also commented on the dramatic quality of Goulding's lyrics and the album's large-scale production. Melissa Maerz of Entertainment Weekly highlighted the album's use of "harp solos" and "digitally tweaked cyborg harmonies", which she said were combined with prominent "disco-ball hooks" and dance-oriented production. The Los Angeles Times's Mikael Wood noted its blend of "thoughtful ruminations" about young love and electronic dance music elements, including synth riffs instrumentation and machine-driven beats. Michael Cragg of The Fly referred to the album as "a bold and confident step forward", while The Diamondback admin considered it an improvement over Lights, noting that it expanded her sound while retaining elements of the style that had established her success.

AllMusic editor Matt Collar lauded Goulding's vocal performance and Halcyon's use of digital effects. He described it as an "ambitious" record that expanded upon her musical style and artistic development. Writing for MusicOMH, John Murphy likewised viewed Halcyon as a more ambitious successor to Lights, highlighting its expanded production and emotionally focused songwriting. He praised several of the album's singles and ballads, but criticised its uneven track listing and described Goulding's distinctive vocal style as potentially divisive. In a review for Rolling Stone, Will Hermes commended the album's hooks and wrote that Goulding's vocals—reminiscent of Dolly Parton—complemented its electronic sound "gorgeously". Geoff Nelson of PopMatters stated that Halcyon expanded on Goulding's musical "genealogy" and represented an effort to reach a wider scale, although he noted flaws in the final result. USA Today's Jerry Shriver noted the album's edgier and more aggressive sound and highlighted Goulding's "swooping, stratosphere-piercing vibrato". He nevertheless felt that the record would have benefited from more variation in its overall mood, stating: "One wishes, however, she'd frolic in the heather now and then for contrast." Consequence viewed it as a contemporary pop album that combined emotional vulnerability with synthetic production. While they praised Goulding's command of modern pop sounds, they argued that the album occasionally suffered from emotional redundancy.

Despite calling Halcyon a "well-crafted, stylish piece of work", Andy Gill of The Independent felt that "it's hard to love songs that try to hide." The Guardian's Rebecca Nicholson opined that it was less sentimental than Lights, but argued that the album occasionally felt "a bit too much". Katherine St. Asaph of Pitchfork highlighted the reduced involvement of Starsmith, a key collaborator on Lights, and noted Jim Eliot's prominent role in the album's production. While she considered Goulding effective at adapting to different musical styles, she felt that Halcyon lacked a fully cohesive sonic identity. NME author Hayley Avron critiqued that Goulding's vocals were "lazily spliced into factory-standard chart dance", while identifying "Joy" and "I Know You Care" as exceptions.

== Commercial performance ==
Halcyon debuted at number two on the UK Albums Chart and at number one on the UK Album Downloads Chart, selling 33,425 copies in its first week–10.3% less than the opening figure for Lights. The following week, it fell to number seven on sales of 11,082 copies. Following the Halcyon Days re-release in August 2013, the album jumped from number 26 to number three on sales of 15,883 units, achieving its then-highest chart placing since its debut. On 5 January 2014, in its 65th week on the chart, Halcyon climbed from number six to number one on the UK Albums Chart with 37,507 copies sold, becoming Goulding's second number-one album in the UK. It spent a second consecutive week at number one, selling 26,456 copies. The following week, the album sold 24,831 copies and fell to number two, before returning to the top spot for a third non-consecutive with sales of 20,928 copies. By September 2026, the album had sold 1,469,289 units in the UK.

Halcyon debuted at number eight on the Irish Albums Chart. The Halcyon Days reissue propelled the album to number seven on the Irish chart for the week ending 29 August 2013, before rising yet again to number four on 19 December. The album eventually topped the Irish Albums Chart for the week ending 2 January 2014, more than a year after its original release and over four months after the re-release. The album debuted at number nine on the US Billboard 200, with 34,000 copies sold in its opening week. As of September 2015, the album had sold 522,000 copies in the United States. In Oceania, it debuted and peaked at number 16 in Australia and at number three in New Zealand. Elsewhere, Halcyon reached the top 10 in Canada, Germany, Greece and Switzerland, and the top 15 in Belgium and Norway.

== Track listing ==
All tracks were produced by Goulding and Eliot, except where noted.

Standard edition
No.	Title	Writer(s)	Producer(s)	Length
1.	"Don't Say a Word"	Ellie Goulding; Jim Eliot		4:07
2.	"My Blood"	Goulding; Eliot; Mima Stilwell		3:54
3.	"Anything Could Happen"	Goulding; Eliot		4:47
4.	"Only You"	Goulding; Eliot		3:51
5.	"Halcyon"	Goulding; Eliot		3:25
6.	"Figure 8"	Goulding; Jonny Lattimer	Monsta; Mike Spencer^{[a]}; Lattimer^{[c]}	4:08
7.	"Joy"	Goulding; Eliot		3:14
8.	"Hanging On"	Patrick James Grossi; Ariel Rechtshaid	Billboard	3:22
9.	"Explosions"	Goulding; John Fortis	Fortis	4:03
10.	"I Know You Care"	Justin Parker; Goulding	Parker	3:26
11.	"Atlantis"	Goulding; Eliot		3:53
12.	"Dead in the Water"	Goulding; Fin Dow-Smith	Starsmith	4:44
13.	"I Need Your Love" (Calvin Harris featuring Ellie Goulding; bonus track)	Harris; Goulding	Harris	3:58
Total length:				50:52

UK deluxe edition
No.	Title	Writer(s)	Producer(s)	Length
14.	"Ritual"	Goulding; Stannard; Howes	Monsta; Stannard^{[c]}; Howes^{[c]}	3:50
15.	"In My City"	Goulding; Mathieu Jomphe	Billboard	3:20
16.	"Without Your Love"	Goulding; Dow-Smith	Starsmith	4:19
17.	"Hanging On" (featuring Tinie Tempah)	Grossi; Rechtshaid; Okogwu	Billboard	4:15
18.	"Lights" (Pnau remix)	Goulding; Stannard; Howes	Stannard; Howes; Pnau^{[b]}	4:05
Total length:				70:41

=== Notes ===
- ^{^[a]} signifies an additional producer.
- ^{^[b]} signifies a remixer.
- ^{^[c]} signifies a vocal producer.
- Some editions feature the short film, Paper Planes and Playground Games, via digital insert.
- International edition additionally features "Lights", (Note: References:) Austrian iTunes Store edition features "Your Song", International Spotify edition features "Hanging On" (Ahadadream remix), and UK special edition features "The Ending" and "High for This".
- Tesco exclusive edition contains "Stay Awake", "Hanging On" (featuring Tinie Tempah), "Anything Could Happen" (White Sea remix), and "Hanging On" (Draper remix) as bonus tracks.
- 2013 North American digital reissue includes "Burn", "Goodness Gracious", "I Need Your Love" (with Calvin Harris), and single version of "Lights".
- International deluxe edition contains single version of "Lights" instead of its Pnau remix. (Note: References:)
- Austrian iTunes Store, North American digital, and Japanese deluxe edition feature "Your Song", Draper remix of "Hanging On", and Fernando Garibay remix of "Lights" as a track 19, respectively.
- UK iTunes Store deluxe edition contains "Hanging On" (featuring Tinie Tempah), "Ritual", "In My City", "Without Your Love", and "Anything Could Happen" (Blood Diamonds remix) as bonus audio tracks, as well as the videos for "Hanging On" and "Anything Could Happen", and Paper Planes and Playground Games.
- Australian and US iTunes Store deluxe editions contain "Hanging On" (featuring Tinie Tempah), "Lights" (single version), "Ritual", "In My City", "Without Your Love", and "Anything Could Happen" (Blood Diamonds remix) as bonus tracks.
- 2013 North American digital deluxe edition contains "Burn", "Goodness Gracious", "I Need Your Love" (with Calvin Harris), "Ritual", "In My City", "Without Your Love", "Hanging On" (featuring Tinie Tempah), and "Lights" (single version) as bonus tracks.
- 2013 North American iTunes Store deluxe edition adds "Anything Could Happen" (Blood Diamonds remix) as an additional bonus track. (Note: References:)

== Credits and personnel ==
Credits were adapted from the liner notes of the UK deluxe edition.

=== Recording locations ===
- Studio Splendido; Wales (tracks 1, 2, 4, 5, 7, 9)
- The Ballroom; London (tracks 6, 14)
- Red Rhino Studios; Montreal (track 8)
- Starsmith HQ; United Kingdom (tracks 12, 16)
- Air Studios; London (track 12)
- EMI Studios; London (track 13)
- Fly Eye Studio; London (track 13)
- Biffco Studios; Brighton (track 14)
- Troublemakers Studio; Montreal (track 15)
- Strongroom; London (track 16)
- Sarm Studios; London (strings: tracks 4, 7, 10)

=== Musicians ===
- Ellie Goulding – vocals (all tracks); acoustic guitar (tracks 2, 5); bass (tracks 4, 5); electric guitar (tracks 11, 16)
- Jim Eliot – drums, synths, piano, percussion, drum programming (tracks 1–5, 7, 11); backing vocals (track 2)
- London Community Gospel Choir – choir (track 3)
- Sally Herbert – choir arrangement, choir conducting (tracks 3, 4, 7, 10); string arrangement, string conducting (tracks 4, 7, 10)
- Rufio Sandilands – all instruments (track 6); keyboards, programming, backing vocals, drums, music (track 14)
- Rocky Morris – all instruments (track 6); keyboards, drums, programming, music (track 14)
- Mike Spencer – all instruments (track 6)
- John Fortis – keyboards, programming (track 9)
- Kirsty Mangan – violin (tracks 9, 12)
- Ashley Krajewski – additional programming (track 9)
- Justin Parker – piano, programming, backing vocals (tracks 10)
- Fin Dow-Smith – piano, synths, string arrangement (track 12); bass, electric guitar, all percussion, Rhodes, backing vocals, all keyboards (track 16)
- Hannah Dawson – violin (track 12)
- Natalie Holt – viola (track 12)
- Rachael Lander – cello (track 12)
- Calvin Harris – all instruments (track 13)
- Ash Howes – additional keyboards, additional programming (track 14)
- Philippe Look – guitar (track 15)
- Joe Clegg – drums (track 16)
- Tinie Tempah – rap vocals (track 17)
- Richard George – violin leader (tracks 4, 7, 10)
- Rick Koster – violin (tracks 4, 7, 10)
- Natalia Bonner – violin (tracks 4, 7, 10)
- Gareth Griffiths – violin (tracks 4, 7, 10)
- Kate Robinson – violin (tracks 4, 7, 10)
- Matty Ward – violin (tracks 4, 7, 10)
- Gillon Cameron – violin (tracks 4, 7, 10)
- Emma Parker – violin (tracks 4, 7, 10)
- Nina Foster – violin (tracks 4, 7, 10)
- Olli Langford – violin (tracks 4, 7, 10)
- John Metcalfe – viola (tracks 4, 7, 10)
- Fiona Bonds – viola (tracks 4, 7, 10)
- Max Baillie – viola (tracks 4, 7, 10)
- Ian Burdge – cello (tracks 4, 7, 10)
- Sophie Harris – cello (tracks 4, 7, 10)
- Jonny Byers – cello (tracks 4, 7, 10)

=== Technical ===
- Jim Eliot – production, sound effects (tracks 1–5, 7, 11)
- Ellie Goulding – production (tracks 1–5, 7, 11)
- Tom Elmhirst – mixing (tracks 1–5, 7–9, 11, 12, 15–17)
- Ben Baptie – mixing assistance (tracks 1–5, 7–9, 11, 12, 15–17); additional engineering (track 3)
- Graham Archer – choir recording engineering (tracks 3, 4, 7, 10); string engineering (tracks 4, 7, 10)
- Joel M. Peters – choir recording engineering assistance (tracks 3, 4, 7, 10); string engineering assistance (tracks 4, 7, 10)
- Monsta – production, recording (tracks 6, 14); additional vocal production (track 6)
- Mike Spencer – additional production, mixing, additional vocal production, recording (track 6)
- Jonny Lattimer – vocal production (track 6)
- Billboard – production (tracks 8, 15, 17)
- Richard Vincent – engineering (tracks 8, 17)
- Philippe Dumais – engineering assistance (tracks 8, 15, 17)
- John Fortis – production (track 9)
- Ashley Krajewski – recording (track 9)
- George Murphy – recording (track 9)
- Justin Parker – production, mixing (tracks 10)
- Starsmith – production (tracks 12, 16)
- Adam Miller – string engineering (track 12)
- John Prestage – string engineering assistance (track 12)
- Calvin Harris – production, mixing (track 13)
- Biff Stannard – vocal production (track 14)
- Ash Howes – vocal production, mixing (track 14)
- Marc Bell – engineering (track 15)
- Lee Slater – drum engineering (track 16)
- Naweed – mastering (tracks 1–12, 14–17)
- Karen Thompson – mastering (track 13)

=== Artwork ===
- Simon Procter – photography
- Ellie Goulding – art direction
- Cassandra Gracey – art direction
- Richard Andrews – design

== Charts ==
=== Weekly charts ===
Chart (2012–2014)	Peak position
Australian Albums (ARIA)	16
Austrian Albums (Ö3 Austria)	51
Belgian Albums (Ultratop Flanders)	14
Belgian Albums (Ultratop Wallonia)	23
Canadian Albums (Billboard)	8
Czech Albums (ČNS IFPI)	49
Danish Albums (Hitlisten)	37
Dutch Albums (Album Top 100)	33
French Albums (SNEP)	85
German Albums (Offizielle Top 100)	8
Greek Albums (IFPI)	10
Irish Albums (IRMA)	1
New Zealand Albums (RMNZ)	3
Norwegian Albums (VG-lista)	15
Scottish Albums (Official Charts)	1
South African Albums (RISA)	20
Swiss Albums (Schweizer Hitparade)	7
UK Albums (Official Charts)	1
US Billboard 200	9

=== Year-end charts ===
Chart (2012)	Position
UK Albums (OCC)	77

Chart (2013)	Position
Belgian Albums (Ultratop Flanders)	53
Belgian Albums (Ultratop Wallonia)	163
Irish Albums (IRMA)	16
UK Albums (OCC)	10
US Billboard 200	118

Chart (2014)	Position
Irish Albums (IRMA)	8
UK Albums (OCC)	12
US Billboard 200	165

=== Decade-end charts ===
Chart (2010–2019)	Position
UK Albums (OCC)	26

== Certifications ==
Certifications and sales
Region	Certification	Certified units/sales
Australia (ARIA)	Gold	35,000^{^}
Austria (IFPI Austria)	Platinum	20,000^{*}
Canada (Music Canada)	2× Platinum	160,000^{‡}
Germany (BVMI)	Gold	100,000^{^}
Mexico (AMPROFON)	Platinum	60,000^{^}
New Zealand (RMNZ)	4× Platinum	60,000^{‡}
Romania (UFPR)	3× Platinum	
Singapore (RIAS)	Platinum	10,000^{*}
Sweden (GLF)	Gold	20,000^{‡}
Switzerland (IFPI Switzerland)	Gold	15,000^{^}
United Kingdom (BPI)	4× Platinum	1,469,289
United States (RIAA)	2× Platinum	2,000,000^{‡}
^{*} Sales figures based on certification alone.^{^} Shipments figures based on certification alone.^{‡} Sales+streaming figures based on certification alone.

== Release history ==
Release dates and formats
Region	Date	Format	Edition	Label	Ref.
Various	5 October 2012	CD; digital download; streaming	Standard; deluxe	Polydor	
United Kingdom	15 June 2015	LP	Standard	Polydor	
