= Remember (Steve Angello song) =

Single by Steve Angello featuring The Presets

from the album Wild Youth
- Released: 1 November 2015
- Recorded: 2015
- Genre: Progressive house
- Length: 5:34
- Label: Size Records
- Songwriters: Steve Angello; Julian Hamilton; Kimberley Moyes; Stuart Price
- Producers: Steve Angello; Stuart Price

Steve Angello singles chronology
"Children Of The Wild" (2015)	"Remember" (2015)	"Tiger" (2015)

The Presets singles chronology
"No Fun" (2014)	"Remember" (2015)	"Do What You Want" (2017)

"Remember" is a song recorded by Australian electronic duo The Presets and Greek-Swedish music producer Steve Angello for his debut studio album, Wild Youth. It was released as the album's third single on 1 November 2015 and has over 12 million streams on Spotify.

== Composition ==
Kicking the song off is some clear, yet dark piano chords and vocals by Julian Hamilton of The Presets as the tempo slowly builds up. Soon after, a simple acoustic guitar riff comes into play, and the airy synth progressions and beat are introduced to the ear. Written and composed in the A sharp major key, "Remember" maintains a tempo of 126.5 beats per minute.

== Critical reception ==
The song received positive reviews with Fum EDM stating, "he's been called the king of house music, and this new track might just convince you of that;" and Andy Hackbarth of We Rave You stating: "While this track might have the main stage festival appeal like some of his previous releases, it does far more to illustrate the craftmanship that Angello has as a producer." He concluded: "'Remember' has us truly excited for what is to come on his album." Ryan Middleton of Music Times also gave a positive review about the song. He complemented the song's "good use of live instruments" and said it "doesn't come off as too poppy or cheesy". He concluded "it could be the best track to emerge from his album yet".

== Music video ==
The concept for the official music video was written by Steve Angello and Lance Drake, and produced by Lance Drake, under the production company FOREST. Angello premiered the video on his Facebook page on 20 November 2015, the same day that the first half of his debut studio album, Wild Youth was released. "This video embodies an important part of my tale", he wrote in the video's caption. "I wanted to touch upon a time in my life that meant so much to me."

The video, 4:24 in length, was uploaded to Angello's YouTube and VEVO account on 23 November 2015. Since then, it has gained over one million views.

The video depicts three young boys on a camping trip in the woods, assumed to be the three members of the progressive house supergroup Swedish House Mafia. The young trio eventually reach a lake. One of the boys walks toward a fire burning in the lake. But before he can succeed in touching it, it disappears, along with the two other boys. Terrified, the boy sets off to find the other two boys as he runs through the woods. Lost along the way, he trips on the door of an underground vault, which he opens and climbs down in. The vault door shuts as he walks toward an abandoned piano in the dark. He then plays the piano, and while doing so, the instrument suddenly catches on fire. For a moment, the boy's face is blocked by the rising fire. Afterward, we see Steve Angello playing the piano instead of the boy. After the fire consumes the piano chords, Angello walks away. He then finds himself under a light only to see that the vault door has opened. So he climbs out of the vault, and walks back to the same lake seen before, and sees the fire burning again. This time, he turns his head to look behind him as footsteps are heard off screen.

Ryan Middleton of Music Times along with many Facebook users suggested that the video was intended to convey a message about the departure of Swedish House Mafia; a reference to the subject.

== Track listing ==
Digital download
No.	Title	Length
1.	"Remember"	5:34

== Covers versions and remixes ==
Pianist Hasit Nanda released a cover version of the song on 21 November 2015. DJs such as Corey James, David Di Sabato, Defuze, and Kris Maydak released remixes for the song respectively.

== Charts ==
Chart (2016)	Peak chart position
Belgium Dance (Ultratop Flanders)	25
Belgium Dance (Ultratop Wallonia)	26
