= I See Monstas =

British electronic music group

- Also known as: Monsta
- Origin: London, England
- Genres: UK bass; soul; dubstep; drumstep; drum and bass; trip hop
- Years active: 2012–present
- Labels: Polydor; Interscope; Owsla; Monstercat
- Members: Rocky Morris; Rufio Sandilands; Skaar
- Website: iseemonstas.com

I See Monstas (often stylised I See MONSTAS, and previously called MONSTA) are a British electronic music group. The group was formed in 2012 and consists of producers Rocky and Rufio (also known collectively as Pegasus) as well as singer Bryn Christopher (also known as Skaar). The trio have officially remixed Labrinth ("Last Time"), Zedd ("Spectrum"), and Tinie Tempah ("Trampoline") among others. They have also produced for Ellie Goulding the songs "Figure 8" and "Ritual" from her second studio album Halcyon.

As Monsta, they released an eponymous EP on Skrillex's label Owsla on 23 October 2012. In 2013 they signed the original tracks from the EP ("Holdin' On", "Messiah" and "Where Did I Go?") to Polydor Records. They released the Messiah EP with remixes from Dirty South and Feed Me on 2 June 2013 through Polydor. Their next single "Evolution" was released on 3 October 2013 shortly after their name change to I See Monstas, and an extended play featuring "Evolution" and three more tracks was released on 18 October 2013.

== Discography ==
=== Extended plays ===
- Monsta (2012)
- Evolution (2013)

=== Singles ===
Year	Song	Peak chart positions	Album
Year	Song	UK	Album
2012	"Holdin' On" (as Monsta)	48	Monsta
2013	"Messiah" (as Monsta)	154	Monsta
2013	"Evolution"	—	Evolution
2014	"Circles"	—	Non-album singles
2015	"XXX"	—	Non-album singles
2015	"Deeper Love" (with Botnek)	—	Non-album singles
2016	"Sinful" (Mat Zo featuring I See Monstas)	—	Self Assemble
— denotes releases that did not chart.

=== Remixes ===
- Spectrum (by Zedd featuring Mathew Koma) (2012)
- Circles (by I See Monstas) (2014)
- Hanging On (by Ellie Goulding) (2014)
- Wasted Love (by Steve Angello) (2014)
- All Over the World (by Above & Beyond featuring Alex Vargas) (2015)

=== Video games ===
- "Holdin' On (Skrillex & Nero Remix)" was featured in the 2013 racing game Asphalt 8: Airborne.
