= Wasted Love (Steve Angello song) =

Single by Steve Angello featuring Dougy

from the album Wild Youth
- Released: 22 July 2014
- Recorded: 2014
- Genre: Progressive house
- Length: 3:29; 5:44 (album version)
- Label: Columbia Records; Size Records
- Songwriters: Steve Angello; Stuart Price; Carl Falk; Herbert Joakim Berg; Dougy Mandagi
- Producers: Steve Angello; Stuart Price

Steve Angello singles chronology
"Payback" (2014)	"Wasted Love" (2014)	"Children Of The Wild" (2015)

Dougy singles chronology
"Wasted Love" (2014)

"Wasted Love" is a song recorded by Greek-Swedish DJ and music producer Steve Angello for his debut studio album, "Wild Youth". It features Indonesian singer-songwriter Dougy, best known as the lead singer of the Australian indie rock band, The Temper Trap.

"Wasted Love" was released as the album's lead single on 22 July 2014. As of May 2016, the song has gained over 11 million streams on Spotify.

== Critical reception ==
The song received positive reviews with Zane Lowe of BBC Radio 1 praising it, calling it a "monstrous sounding record" when he premiered it as "hottest record in the world" on 14 July 2014; and Chris Erickson of Daily Beat referring to the song as "a fantastic track" and "a great way to reintroduce the world to Steve Angello as a solo artist." In a review Meggie Morris of Renowned for Sound wrote, Morris gave the song four out of five stars saying, "Wasted Love steps away from the droning, repetitive sounds characteristic of current dance music, and creates a space in which tangible song-writing can occur." She ultimately concluded that, "Angello has created a dance song that feels more alive."

== Music video ==
Two videos were produced for the song, one of which, being the official music video, and the other being the lyric video.

The official music video, directed by Lance Drake, features an iconic cameo from Steve Angello and an epic performance from Dougy. In the video, we step into a vast "desert landscape meets art installation" world where we watch a video game of life being played. Moving from level to level, each obstacle represents birth, struggle, love, and death, until the game is over.

The lyric video was directed by Robin Asselmeyer, and produced by Filip Kiisk and Marcus Nybladh. Shot in Angello's home country Sweden, the lyric video shows images of fans in the crowd at Angello's live shows.

Both of the videos were released on YouTube through Angello's VEVO account on 12 November 2015.

== Track listing ==
Digital download
No.	Title	Length
1.	"Wasted Love"	3:29

Remixes EP
No.	Title	Length
1.	"Wasted Love" (Extended Club Version)	6:41
2.	"Wasted Love" (iSHi Remix)	4:08
3.	"Wasted Love" (PANG! Remix)	6:25
4.	"Wasted Love" (Grum Remix)	6:52
5.	"Wasted Love" (I See Monstas Remix)	4:01
6.	"Wasted Love" (The Cube Guys Remix)	7:21
7.	"Wasted Love" (Dirty Vegas Remix)	5:42
8.	"Wasted Love" (AN21 & Sebjak Remix)	6:34

== Charts ==
=== Weekly charts ===
Chart (2014)	Peak position
Sweden (Sverigetopplistan)	58
US Hot Dance/Electronic Songs (Billboard)	26
US Dance Club Songs (Billboard)	9

=== Year-end charts ===
Chart (2014)	Position
US Hot Dance/Electronic Songs (Billboard)	89
