= Monsta (EP) =

EP by MONSTA
- Released: 23 October 2012
- Genre: Soul; dubstep; moombahcore; drum and bass
- Label: Owsla
- Producer: Rocky; Rufio

MONSTA chronology
Monsta (2012)	Evolution (2013)

Singles from Monsta
- 1. "Messiah" Released: 2 June 2013

Monsta is the debut extended play (EP) by the British electronic group I See MONSTAS (at the time known as MONSTA). It was released on 23 October 2012 through Owsla. The EP spawned a single, "Messiah", which entered the UK Singles Chart at number 154. "Holdin' On" climbed the UK Singles Chart to number 48, due to strong sales of the Skrillex and Nero remix. It also peaked at number ten on UK Dance Chart and number three the UK Indie Chart.

== Critical response ==
Vibe noted that "Messiah" was "brimming [with] raw energy while a grinding bass rhythm chugs along in the background with an overlay of powerfully deep vocals". Mixmag commented that the Skrillex and Nero remix "should boost the production outfit further into the EDM stratosphere". Dancing Astronaut praised the release, commenting that "listeners can hear the power behind Skaar’s silky androgynous voice" and "adding the sounds of Skaar’s gritty soulful voice prove dubstep does not have to be the cliche “bass in your face” genre it has become".

== Track listing ==
All songs written and produced by MONSTA.

Digital download
No.	Title	Length
1.	"Holdin' On"	4:01
2.	"Messiah"	3:59
3.	"Where Did I Go?"	4:03
4.	"Holdin' On" (Skrillex and Nero Remix)	3:57
5.	"Messiah" (Alvin Risk Remix)	3:20
6.	"Where Did I Go?" (Dillon Francis and Kill Paris Remix)	4:00

== Chart performance ==
=== For "Messiah" ===
Chart positions listed for "Messiah".

Chart (2013)	Peak position
UK Dance (OCC)	33
UK Singles (OCC)	154

=== For "Holdin' On" ===
Chart positions listed for "Holdin' On".

Chart (2013)	Peak position
UK Dance (OCC)	10
UK Indie (OCC)	3
UK Indie Breakers (Official Charts Company)	1
UK Singles (OCC)	48

== Release history ==
Region	Date	Format	Label
Worldwide	23 October 2012	Digital download	Owsla
