= Figure 8 (song) =

2012 single by Ellie Goulding

Single by Ellie Goulding

from the album Halcyon
- Released: 14 December 2012
- Recorded: 2012
- Studio: The Ballroom (London)
- Genre: Dubstep; electro-rock
- Length: 4:08
- Label: Polydor
- Songwriters: Ellie Goulding; Jonny Lattimer
- Producer: Monsta

Ellie Goulding singles chronology
"Anything Could Happen" (2012)	"Figure 8" (2012)	"Explosions" (2013)

Music video
- "Figure 8" on YouTube

"Figure 8" is a song by the English singer-songwriter Ellie Goulding from her second studio album, Halcyon (2012). It was released on 14 December 2012 as the album's second single. The song was written by Goulding and Jonny Lattimer and produced by Monsta, with additional production by Mike Spencer. The accompanying music video was directed by W.I.Z. and released on 19 November 2012.

== Critical reception ==
"Figure 8" received mostly positive reviews from music critics. Michael Roffman of Time called it "a defensive track that finds [Goulding] reasoning with her scorched paths", adding that Spencer's work with Jamiroquai or Kylie Minogue "injects a scenic quality that bludgeons with cinematic density." Digital Spy's Lewis Corner noted the song "continues to explore Ellie's ascent into womanhood, centering around her experience of being left heartbroken by a former love over a buzzing dubstep bassline that vibrates with a gentle nod to the album's namesake."

Sam Lansky of Idolator opined that "Figure 8" "gives the obligatory concession to dubstep, with production by MONSTA serving as effectively, if not more so, than [...] Skrillex himself would have done." Scott Shetler of PopCrush wrote, "Built around piano and electronics, 'Figure 8' has a moody vibe that matches its heartbreaking lyrics", while comparing it to Alex Clare's "Too Close", a song co-produced by Spencer. However, in a review of Halcyon, BBC Music's Ben Hewitt expressed, "Far from showing off her talents, the likes of 'Figure 8' and 'Atlantis' become bottomless pits filled with heavy-handed knob-twiddling."

== Commercial performance ==
"Figure 8" debuted at number 121 on the UK Singles Chart dated 8 December 2012, ahead of its single release, entering the top 100 at number 82 the following week. After jumping to number 49, the single peaked at number 33 in its fourth week on the chart. The song fared better in New Zealand, where it peaked at number seven, her highest-charting single in that country at that point, and was later certified platinum by Recorded Music NZ. "Figure 8" became Goulding's first song to chart in Finland, reaching number eight.

== Music video ==
The music video for "Figure 8", directed by W.I.Z., was filmed in a mansion outside London, and features freerunner Tim Shieff. The video premiered on 19 November 2012. Switching constantly between black-and-white and coloured shots, the video reflects on breaking up with an ex and then missing them. It consists of intercut scenes of Goulding in the mansion in several different situations, such as lying on a mattress as she clutches a red piece of cloth, lying in bed with her on-screen boyfriend, dressed in a red, flowing gown while covered in a red veil, blindfolded, and breaking dishes. Towards the end of the video, Goulding's lit-up body is shown levitating off the bed, as she lets go of the red cloth.

== Track listing ==
Digital EP – Remixes
No.	Title	Length
1.	"Figure 8" (Radio Edit)	3:39
2.	"Anything Could Happen" (Radio 1 Live Lounge Version)	3:03
3.	"Figure 8" (Breakage's Crenshaw & Adams Mix)	4:26
4.	"Figure 8" (French Fries Club Mix)	5:23
5.	"Figure 8" (Xilent Remix)	4:30

== Credits and personnel ==
Credits adapted from the liner notes of Halcyon.

- Ellie Goulding – vocals
- Rufio Sandilands – arrangement, all instruments
- Rocky Morris – arrangement, all instruments
- Monsta – production, additional vocal production, recording
- Mike Spencer – additional production, mix, additional vocal production, all instruments, recording
- Jonny Lattimer – vocal production
- Naweed – mastering

== Charts ==
=== Weekly charts ===
Weekly chart performance for "Figure 8"
Chart (2012–2013)	Peak position
Finland (Suomen virallinen lista)	8
Japan Hot 100 (Billboard)	97
New Zealand (Recorded Music NZ)	7
Scottish Singles Sales (Official Charts)	33
Slovakia Airplay (ČNS IFPI)	26
UK Singles (Official Charts)	33

=== Year-end charts ===
Year-end chart performance for "Figure 8"
Chart (2013)	Position
New Zealand (Recorded Music NZ)	50

== Certifications ==
Certifications for "Figure 8"
Region	Certification	Certified units/sales
New Zealand (RMNZ)	Platinum	15,000^{*}
^{*} Sales figures based on certification alone.

== Release history ==
Release dates and formats for "Figure 8"
Region	Date	Format	Label	Ref.
Australia	14 December 2012	Digital download	Universal	
Belgium	14 December 2012	Digital download	Universal	
Finland	14 December 2012	Digital download	Universal	
Ireland	14 December 2012	Digital download	Polydor	
New Zealand	14 December 2012	Digital download	Universal	
Netherlands	15 December 2012	Digital download	Universal	
France	16 December 2012	Digital download	Universal	
Norway	16 December 2012	Digital download	Universal	
Portugal	16 December 2012	Digital download	Universal	
Spain	16 December 2012	Digital download	Universal	
United Kingdom	16 December 2012	Digital download	Polydor	
