= Anything Could Happen =

2012 single by Ellie Goulding

Single by Ellie Goulding

from the album Halcyon
- Released: 17 August 2012
- Genre: Electropop; synth-pop
- Length: 4:47
- Label: Polydor
- Songwriters: Ellie Goulding; Jim Eliot
- Producers: Jim Eliot; Ellie Goulding

Ellie Goulding singles chronology
"Lights" (2011)	"Anything Could Happen" (2012)	"Figure 8" (2012)

Music video
- "Anything Could Happen" on YouTube

"Anything Could Happen" is a song by the English singer and songwriter Ellie Goulding from her second studio album, Halcyon (2012). It was released on 17 August 2012 as the album's lead single. Written and produced by Goulding and Jim Eliot of English electropop duo Kish Mauve, the song received positive reviews from music critics. "Anything Could Happen" peaked at number five on the UK Singles Chart. Outside the United Kingdom, "Anything Could Happen" peaked within the top ten of the charts in Poland, the top 20 of the charts in Australia, the Czech Republic Ireland and New Zealand and the top 50 of the charts in the United States.

The accompanying music video was directed by Floria Sigismondi and filmed in Malibu, California. The video depicts Goulding and her on-screen boyfriend getting into a car accident. "Anything Could Happen" was used in the Beats by Dre's #ShowYourColor campaign commercial and in the trailer for the second season of the HBO series Girls. The song has been covered by the Script, Fun and Fifth Harmony.

== Background and composition ==
Goulding appeared on Fearne Cotton's BBC Radio 1 show on 9 August 2012 for the premiere of the song. She told Cotton, "I've been with this song a long time and I've had to listen to it a lot to get it just how I wanted it."

During a behind-the-scenes featurette for the "Anything Could Happen" music video, Goulding told MTV News, "I suppose it's one of those songs where I sort of talk about bits of my childhood, but also about my friendship with this person, and, um, I suppose it's a song of realization [...] And it's called 'Anything Could Happen,' [so] I'm hoping it will make people go out and propose to their girlfriends or go on that holiday they never ended up doing. I hope it will provoke positivity, as opposed to make people really sad."

"Anything Could Happen" is an electropop and synth-pop song. According to the sheet music published at Musicnotes by Sony/ATV Music Publishing, "Anything Could Happen" is written in the key of C major and has a moderate tempo of 103 beats per minute. Goulding's vocals span from G_{3} to E_{5} in the song.

== Critical reception ==
"Anything Could Happen" received positive reviews from critics, with most praising the lyrical content and Goulding's vocals. Lewis Corner of Digital Spy gave "Anything Could Happen" four out of five stars, stating, "'After the war we said we'd fight together/ I guess we thought that's what humans do,' the electro-folk starlet serenades over a booming bass synth and choppy piano, before bursting into a sky-soaring chorus that manages to keep up with her haunting, high-pitched "ooohs". The result is a gothic love anthem that, truth be told, we'd happily see replace 'Puppy Love' at wedding receptions for years to come." Entertainment Weekly commented that with "Anything Could Happen", Goulding "strikes shimmery synth-pop gold again." Erin Thompson of the Seattle Weekly called the song "lovely" and "impactful", while commending Goulding for "writing songs that unfold like stories". "Anything Could Happen" was ranked number 84 by the Village Voice's annual Pazz & Jop critics' poll.

== Commercial performance ==
"Anything Could Happen" debuted at number five on the UK Singles Chart, selling 49,680 copies in its first week. The single stayed at number five the following week, selling 37,895 copies. As of April 2023, it had sold 620,000 copies in the UK alone.

In the United States, "Anything Could Happen" debuted at number 17 on the Bubbling Under Hot 100 Singles chart on the issue dated 8 September 2012, before rising to number three on 20 October upon its release to radio. The song entered the Billboard Hot 100 at number 75 for the week of 27 October 2012, peaking at number 47 in its tenth week on the chart. It also topped the Hot Dance Club Songs chart during the final week of 2012. The single was certified gold by the Recording Industry Association of America (RIAA) on 17 January 2013, and platinum on 24 July 2013. As of January 2014, the song had sold 1,166,000 copies in the US.

The song performed moderately elsewhere, reaching number two in Poland, number 16 in the Czech Republic, Ireland and New Zealand, number 20 in Australia, number 37 in Canada and number 66 in Germany.

== Music video ==
The music video for "Anything Could Happen" was directed by Floria Sigismondi. In an interview with Carson Daly on his 97.1 AMP Radio show on 6 August 2012, Goulding stated that the video would be filmed the following day in Malibu, California. The video revolves around a couple's car crash near a Malibu beach. "I find myself on a rock, with no idea how I've been there", she told Fuse. "I've been in a car crash. I end up being a mermaid-type thing." She added, "I wanted to do a big video with big effects by the ocean [...] I wanted to do something really epic." Goulding declined offers of a stuntwoman to help her shoot the video, and instead performed her own stunts, such as being dropped onto a roof.

On 5 September, the "Anything Could Happen" video debuted via Goulding's YouTube channel. The video shows Goulding in a car with her on-screen boyfriend as they observe waves crashing on a beach. Goulding is then seen waking up on the beach, singing to the song, and walking around the beach finding silver floating spheres and triangled shaped mirrors. Goulding is also seen close up crying while singing and then bleeding out of her nose. The video continues to show Goulding and the on-screen boyfriend in a car crash, meeting up again in their "after life" on the beach. Later, Goulding is shown looking on to the car crash from above, while observing her boyfriend, with a big fluffy pink ball holding her up by ropes. The video ends as Goulding floats away from the crash scene.

=== Lyric video ===
In late July 2012, Goulding invited fans via Facebook to contribute to a lyric video for "Anything Could Happen" by submitting photos related to the song's lyrics using Instagram. The lyric video premiered on Goulding's YouTube channel on 9 August 2012.

=== Ben & Ellie Edit ===
A second music video, titled the Ben & Ellie Edit, was released on Goulding's YouTube channel on 9 October 2012. This version all shot close up and cross fading into different scenes. The video begins with the text "Ellie Goulding", and flashes of a car driving and Goulding in multiple shots of her body. Once the song begins, Goulding starts singing, multiple shots of her being shown, close-up, side view, and bright lights, singing along.

== Notable performances ==
In 2012, Goulding performed "Anything Could Happen" on Later... with Jools Holland. She also performed the song live on the American morning program, The Today Show on 10 October 2012.

On 30 September 2021, Goulding performed the song surrounded by floating cloud structures and white-clad dancers as part of the opening ceremony of Expo 2020 held under the fair's centerpiece, the Al Wasl Dome in Dubai, U.A.E.

== Legacy ==
=== Use in media and cover versions ===
Goulding is featured performing "Anything Could Happen" in the Beats by Dre commercial as part of their #ShowYourColor campaign, which debuted in September 2012, alongside the likes of Miami Heat player LeBron James and fellow Universal Music artists Lil Wayne and MGK.

The track was also used in the trailer for the second season of the HBO comedy-drama series Girls and in an episode of the Fox sitcom New Girl. It was also used in the trailer for the fourth season of the Network Ten comedy-drama series Offspring in Australia. The track was also used by TBS during the intro for game one of the 2012 ALDS between the Oakland Athletics and the Detroit Tigers. The song is also featured as the background music for the HTC Vive commercial, with Emily Blunt, Jennifer Garner, Michelle Yeoh and Juliette Lewis.

The song was covered in BBC Radio 1's Live Lounge by various artists including, Irish alternative rock band the Script, American indie pop band Fun, and Norwegian pop singer Sigrid on 27 November 2012, 26 February 2013, and 12 January 2018, respectively. In December 2012, the girl group Fifth Harmony performed "Anything Could Happen" in the semi-finals and finals on the second season of The X Factor (U.S.). Melissa Benoist, Jacob Artist and Kevin McHale covered the song in the fourteenth episode of the fourth season of the Fox series Glee, "I Do", aired 14 February 2013.

Goulding joined Taylor Swift for a surprise performance of the song during Swift's Red Tour at Los Angeles' Staples Center on 23 August 2013. On 14 December 2013, Goulding performed "Anything Could Happen" on tenth series finale of The X Factor with finalist Luke Friend. American young adult author Will Walton credited "Anything Could Happen" as the inspiration for his 2015 debut novel of the same name which was published under David Levithan's imprint Push. The track has also been featured in the 2013 teen comedy film G.B.F., and in the official trailer for the 2023 Roku film, Meet Me in Paris.

In 2025, "Anything Could Happen" was used in the trailer for the series finale of the Amazon Prime series The Summer I Turned Pretty, and the Netflix romantic comedy film Champagne Problems. The song was featured on the second season of the Netflix original series Nobody Wants This.

=== Recognitions ===
In 2014, Goulding was honored with a BMI London Pop Award in recognition of the song success. In 2017, Billboard placed the track as fifth on their Goulding's 10 best songs list, while music critic Kat Bein called the song "one of the most optimistic tracks in recent memory" and praised the track breakdown as "one of the best builds in music". In 2023, Rolling Stone named "Anything Could Happen" the 39th "Most Inspirational LGBTQ Song of All-Time" with music critic Ilana Kaplan calling it a "gay club anthem". Kaplan noticed that while the song "it's not explicitly about the LGBTQ community, it's a battle cry that has queer undertones" such as "overcoming adversity, and shrouding your identity."

== Track listings ==
UK and Irish digital EP – Remixes
No.	Title	Length
1.	"Anything Could Happen"	4:46
2.	"Anything Could Happen" (Birdy Nam Nam Remix)	4:01
3.	"Anything Could Happen" (Submerse Remix)	5:02
4.	"Hanging On" (Sigma Remix)	4:40

US limited-edition 7-inch promotional single
No.	Title	Length
1.	"A. Anything Could Happen"	4:46
2.	"B. Anything Could Happen" (White Sea Remix)	5:06

Canadian and US digital EP – Remixed
No.	Title	Length
1.	"Anything Could Happen" (Betablock3r Remix)	4:46
2.	"Anything Could Happen" (Alex Metric Remix)	7:07
3.	"Anything Could Happen" (Flinch Remix)	4:24
4.	"Anything Could Happen" (Birdy Nam Nam Remix)	4:01
5.	"Anything Could Happen" (White Sea Remix)	5:03
6.	"Anything Could Happen" (Submerse Remix)	5:02
7.	"Anything Could Happen" (Guy Scheiman TLV Club Remix)	7:45

== Credits and personnel ==
Credits adapted from the liner notes of Halcyon.

- Ellie Goulding – vocals, production
- Jim Eliot – production, drums, synths, piano, percussion, drum programming, sound effects
- London Community Gospel Choir – choir
- Sally Herbert – choir arrangement, choir conducting
- Graham Archer – choir recording engineering
- Joel M. Peters – choir recording engineering assistance
- Tom Elmhirst – mixing
- Ben Baptie – mixing assistance, additional engineering
- Naweed – mastering

== Charts ==
=== Weekly charts ===
Weekly chart performance for "Anything Could Happen"
Chart (2012–2013)	Peak position
Australia (ARIA)	20
Belgium (Ultratop 50 Flanders)	31
Canada Hot 100 (Billboard)	37
Czech Republic Airplay (ČNS IFPI)	16
Euro Digital Song Sales (Billboard)	9
Germany (GfK)	66
Ireland (IRMA)	16
New Zealand (Recorded Music NZ)	16
Poland Airplay (ZPAV)	2
Romania (Romanian Top 100)	58
Scottish Singles Sales (Official Charts)	5
Switzerland (Schweizer Hitparade)	68
UK Singles (Official Charts)	5
US Billboard Hot 100	47
US Dance Club Songs (Billboard)	1
US Pop Airplay (Billboard)	28

=== Year-end charts ===
2012 year-end chart performance for "Anything Could Happen"
Chart (2012)	Position
UK Singles (OCC)	98

2013 year-end chart performance for "Anything Could Happen"
Chart (2013)	Position
UK Singles (OCC)	146
US Dance Club Songs (Billboard)	26

== Certifications ==
Certifications for "Anything Could Happen"
Region	Certification	Certified units/sales
Australia (ARIA)	Gold	35,000^{^}
Brazil (Pro-Música Brasil)	Gold	30,000^{‡}
Mexico (AMPROFON)	Gold	30,000^{*}
New Zealand (RMNZ)	Platinum	15,000^{*}
Norway (IFPI Norway)	Platinum	10,000^{*}
United Kingdom (BPI)	Platinum	620,000
United States (RIAA)	2× Platinum	1,166,000
^{*} Sales figures based on certification alone.^{^} Shipments figures based on certification alone.^{‡} Sales+streaming figures based on certification alone.

== Release history ==
Release dates and formats for "Anything Could Happen"
Region	Date	Format	Label	Ref.
Australia	17 August 2012	Digital download	Universal	
Belgium	17 August 2012	Digital download	Universal	
France	17 August 2012	Digital download	Universal	
Germany	17 August 2012	Digital download	Universal	
Sweden	17 August 2012	Digital download	Universal	
Canada	21 August 2012	Digital download	Universal	
United States	21 August 2012	Digital download	Cherrytree; Interscope	
Ireland	27 September 2012	Digital EP – Remixes	Polydor	
United Kingdom	27 September 2012	Digital EP – Remixes	Polydor	
United States	2 October 2012	Contemporary hit radio	Cherrytree; Interscope	
Canada	15 January 2013	Digital EP – Remixed	Universal	
United States	15 January 2013	Digital EP – Remixed	Cherrytree; Interscope	

== See also ==
- List of Billboard Dance Club Songs number ones of 2012
