= Steve Angello =

Greek-Swedish DJ, record producer, remixer and record label owner (born 1982)

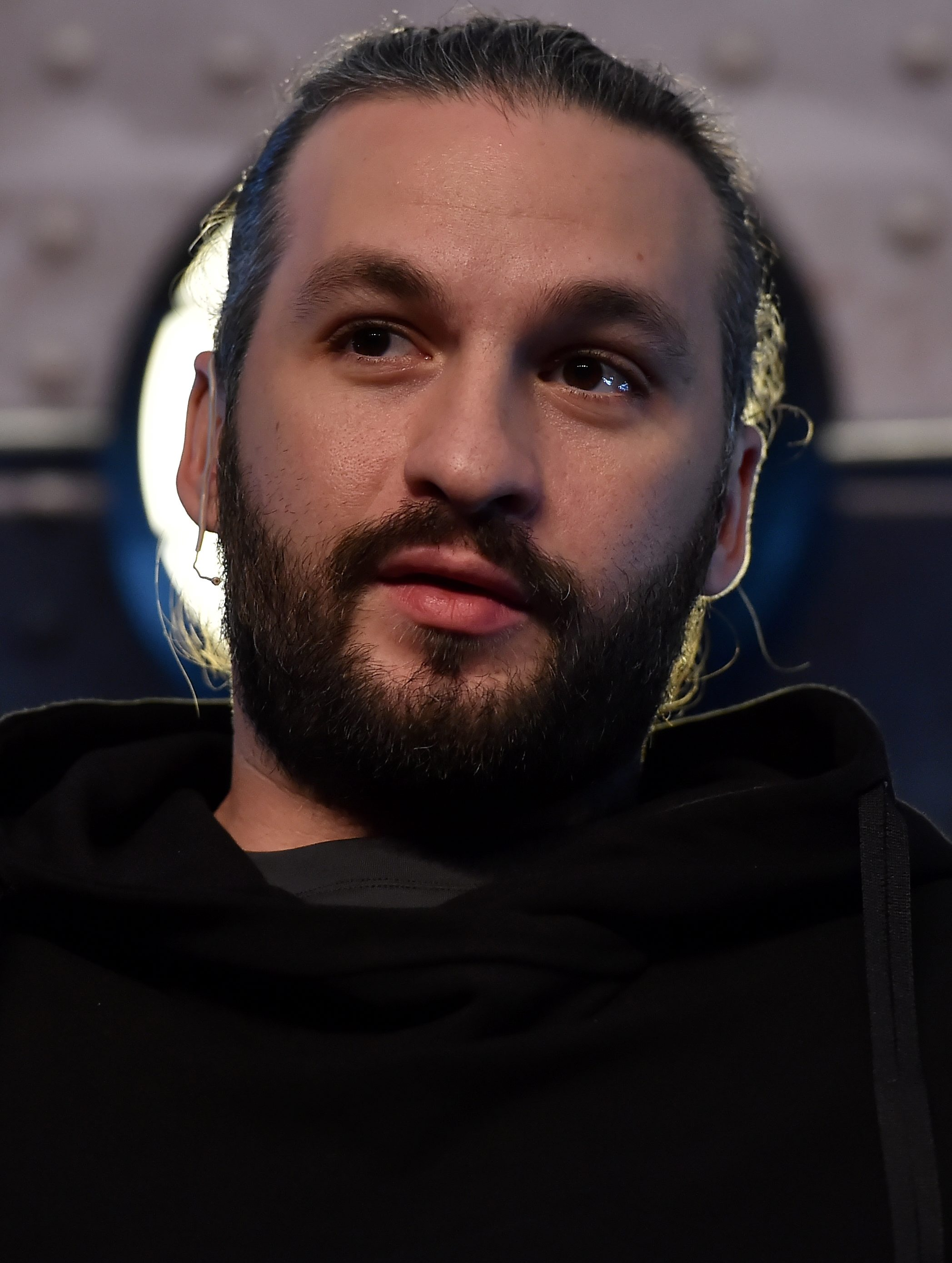
- Angello in 2015

Background information
- Born: Steve Patrik Angello Josefsson Fragogiannis; 22 November 1982 (age 43); Athens, Greece
- Genres: Progressive house; electro house; tech house
- Occupations: DJ; record producer; remixer; record label owner
- Years active: 2001–present
- Labels: Size; X; Columbia
- Member of: Swedish House Mafia; Supermode; Buy Now
- Website: steveangello.com

Steve Patrik Angello Josefsson Fragogiannis (born 22 November 1982), known professionally as Steve Angello, is a Greek–Swedish DJ, record producer, remixer and record label owner. He is a member of Swedish House Mafia, together with Axwell and Sebastian Ingrosso.

== Early life ==
Steve Angello was born to a Greek father and Swedish mother in Athens, Greece. His maternal grandfather was Romani. He was raised in Ulriksdal in Solna, Sweden, along with his brother Antoine Josefsson. Angello began as a scratch DJ at 12 years of age and was involved in many scratch competitions, combining hip-hop, breakbeats and 1970s classics. By his late teens, he began listening to electronic music and started as an electronic DJ.

== Career ==
=== 2001–2006: Career beginnings and Size Records ===
Steve Angello began producing under the alias Who's Who and released tracks called "Not So Dirty" and "Sexy F*ck".

He often worked with fellow Swedish DJ Sebastian Ingrosso on DJing, producing under the names Buy Now, Fireflies, General Moders, Mode Hookers, Outfunk, and The Sinners. Angello released his early records through Subliminal, Records, Cr2, and Refune, as well as producing for Interscope Records, however he is owner and founder of Size Records based in Stockholm, Sweden which was established in 2003. Through Size, he has released singles such as "Gypsy", "Isabel" and "Flonko". In 2004 Angello released his remix of Eurythmics' "Sweet Dreams (Are Made of This)", and also has produced with Eric Prydz under the name A&P Project.

In 2006, Angello has created an alias with Axwell under the name Supermongo, later renamed to Supermode, in which they released the hit single "Tell Me Why", a cover version of an old Bronski Beat track, Ministry of Sound's Data Records.

=== 2006–2008: Breakthrough singles and productions ===
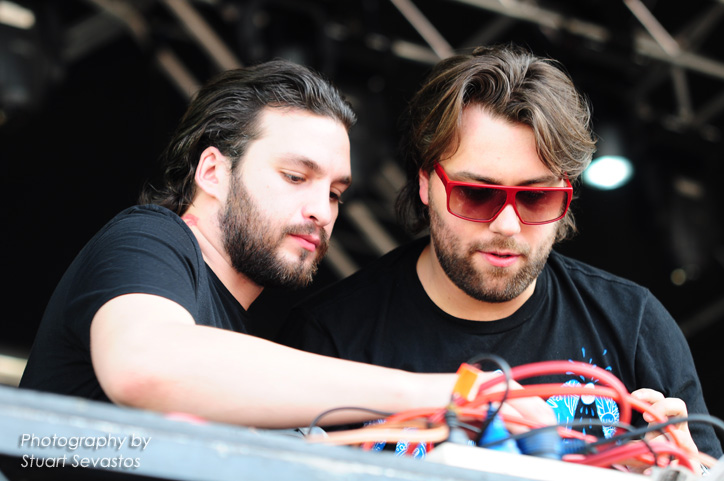
Angello (left) with Sebastian Ingrosso performing in Wellington Square

Following the success of Supermode's "Tell Me Why", Steve Angello's first major commercial hit as a solo artist came in 2007 from a feature on David Guetta's "Baby When the Light". Angello was later given credit for the song after only given production and songwriting credits after producing it for Guetta's third studio album Pop Life. 2007 also saw some success come from his collaboration with Sebastian Ingrosso, "Umbrella", however this was not as successful. Crossing into the new year, Steve Angello releases a trio of songs with Sebastian Ingrosso and Laidback Luke, called "Be", "555", and "It" in the order of released, however Angello's next breakthrough song was a remake of Robin S.'s 1990 song "Show Me Love". The remix was done with Dutch DJ and frequent collaborator Laidback Luke and features rerecord vocals from Robin S.. The song was a number one hit on the UK dance charts and is still a major part of Swedish House Mafia sets to this day. The song would feature on the band's debut album Until One.

=== 2008–2013: Swedish House Mafia ===
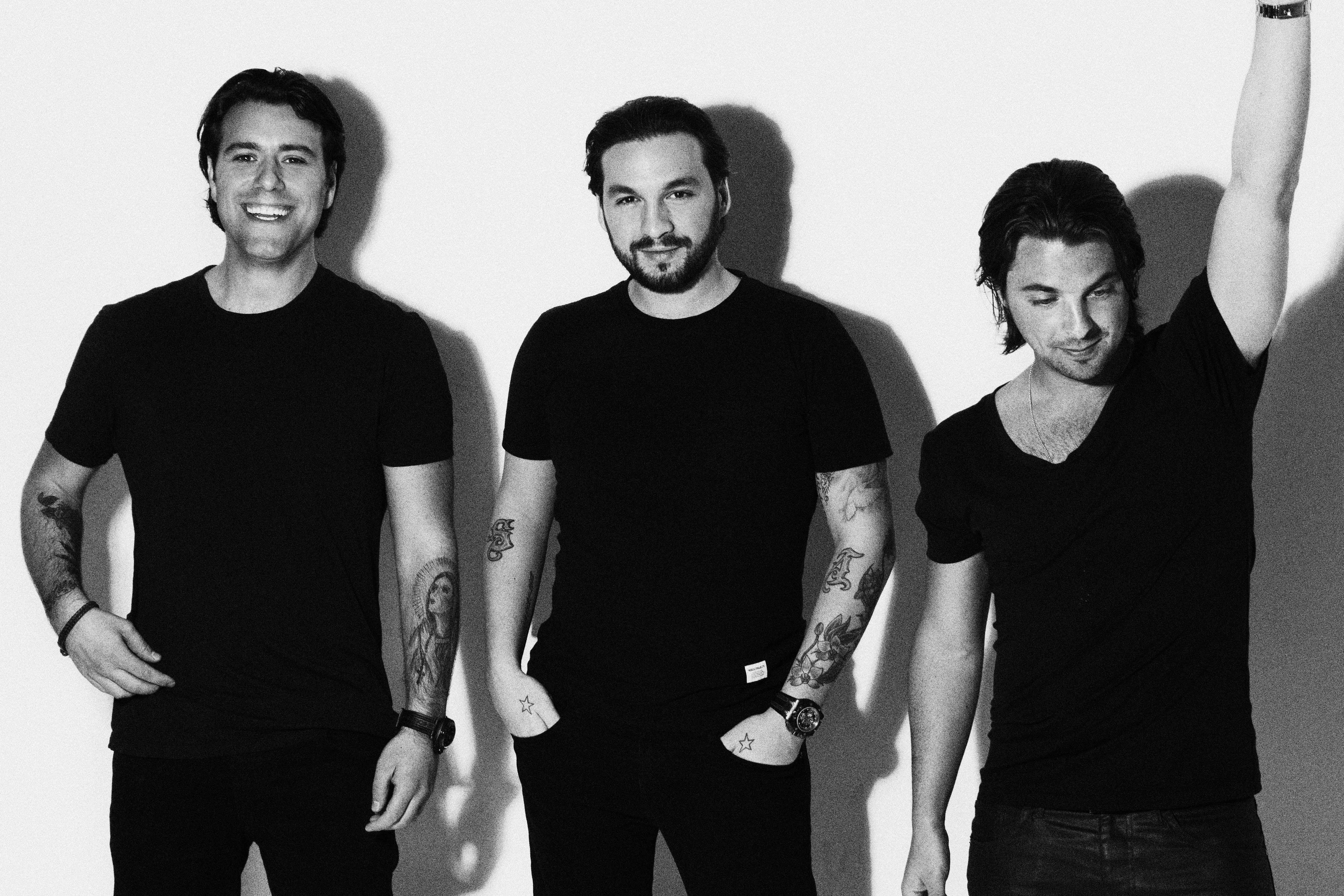
Angello (centre) with Swedish House Mafia during their Until Now photoshoot in 2012

==== 2008–2010: Until One ====
In late 2008, Steve Angello, Axwell, and Sebastian Ingrosso formed the Swedish House Mafia with Eric Prydz not joining, saying he is a control freak and cannot abide with collaborations even with close friends. Around this time Swedish House Mafia released two songs, "Get Dumb" and "Leave the World Behind", however these weren't credited under the group name. Angello himself collaborated with David Guetta on the songs "Everytime We Touch" along with Ingrosso for Guetta's third studio album Pop Life. In 2010, he released his debut album with Swedish House Mafia named Until One. This followed the release of two successful single "One (Your Name)" (featuring Pharrell Williams) and "Miami 2 Ibiza" (featuring Tinie Tempah). The album also contained solo work by Steve Angello such as the songs "Valodja" and "Tivoli", and one of his most successful solo songs "Show Me Love which was released in 2008. In 2010 Angello produced his, AN21's, and Max Vangeli's remix for Pendulum's "The Island" and his own remix of Alex Metric's "Open Your Eyes", which was later used in the video game FIFA 12 released in September 2011. 2010 also saw Angello make his Tomorrowland debut with Swedish House Mafia and achieved his highest position on the DJ Mag poll at number 14 while Swedish House Mafia debuted at number 23.

==== 2011–2012: Until Now ====
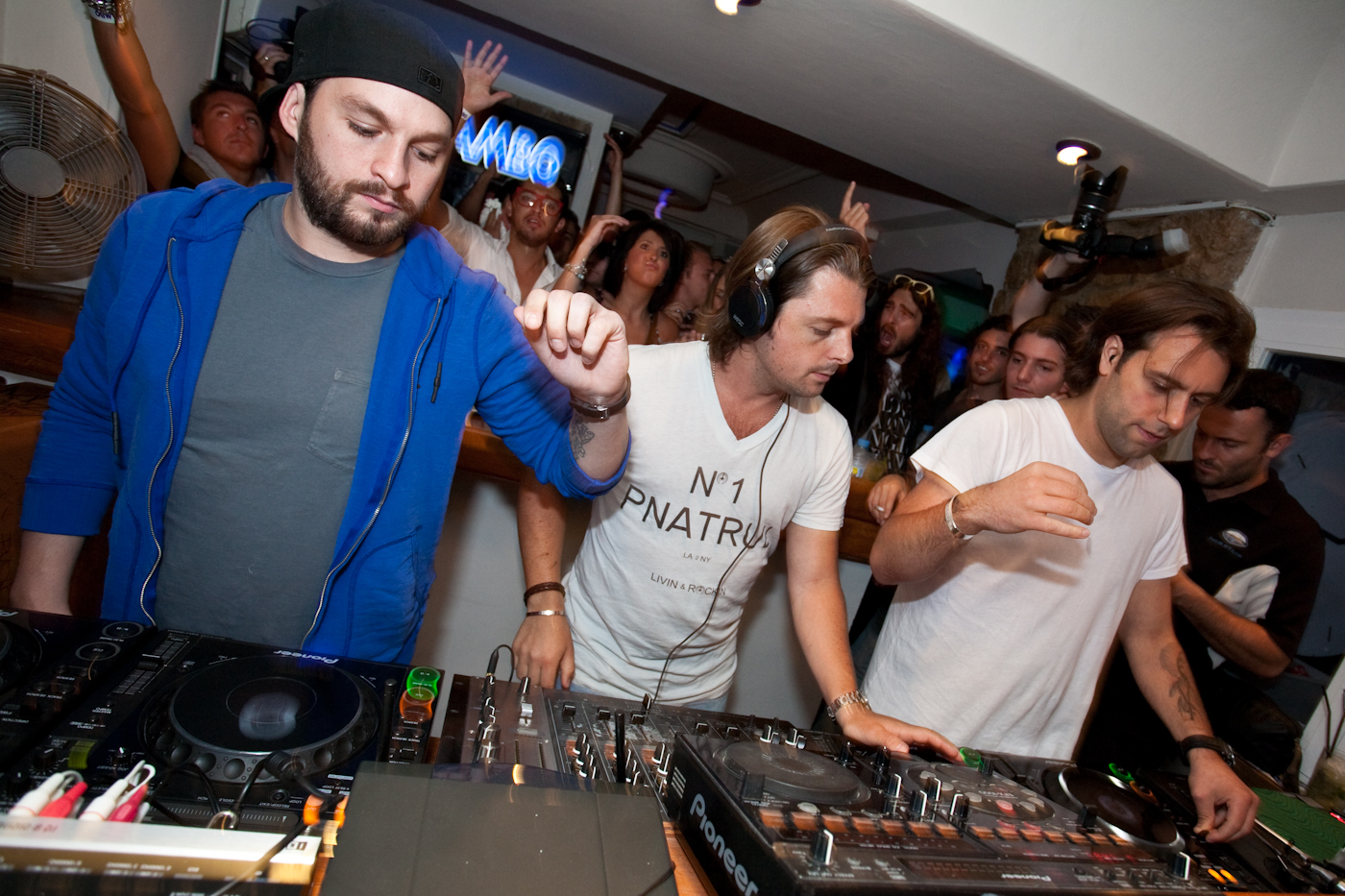
Angello (left) with Swedish House Mafia performing in Ibiza

In May 2011, Steve Angello began work on his second album with Swedish House Mafia with the release of the single Save the World featuring vocals from Swedish singer John Martin. In the summer Swedish House Mafia again performed at Tomorrowland and released two more songs in the winter named "Antidote" and "Greyhound". In July 2012, Swedish House Mafia again performed at Tomorrowland for the third consecutive year, this time heading the event and opening Night 2. In September following a successful summer of live performances, Swedish House Mafia released their most commercially successful track "Don't You Worry Child", again featuring the vocal of John Martin which reach number 1 in Sweden, Australia, and the UK and was a multiplatinum song in many countries. This would feature on Swedish House Mafia's second studio/compilation album Until Now along with all previous Swedish House Mafia singles plus Angello's 2012 collaboration with British DJs Third Party, "Lights" in addition to his remix of Pendulum's "The Island". Until Now was released on 19 October 2012. 2012, also saw Angello launched Size TV, in which Angello allows camera to record his personal and working life, in addition to releasing a first non-compilation studio album in entitled People of the Night in collaboration with AN21 & Max Vangeli, of whom Angello often tours with.

==== 2012–2013: One Last Tour ====
In November 2012, Swedish House Mafia kicked off their One Last Tour after its announcement in June of that year. The supergroup stated that the final leg of this tour would be their last and the group would split up after its conclusion at Ultra Music Festival Miami 2013.

=== 2013–2014: Size Records expansion ===
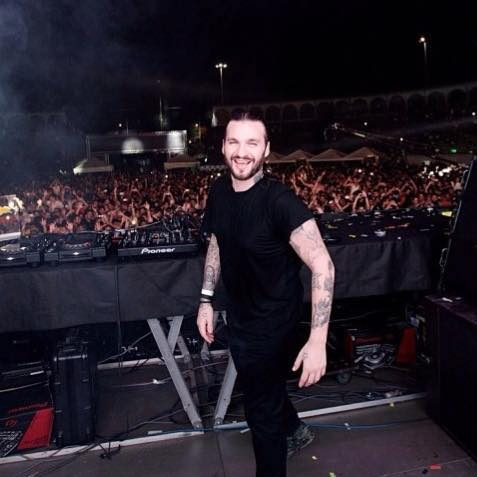
Steve Angello performing at Seven Music Festival 2013

In March 2013, Angello's record label, Size Records, began distributing for Junior Sanchez's record label Brobot Records. Angello also launched "X", a sister label to Size Records more focused on tech house, with the first release on the label being an EP by Trent Cantrelle called "Nice and Close". In August 2013, Steve Angello observed Size Records's tenth anniversary with by releasing the song "SLVR" (pronounced "Silver"), in collaboration with Russian production duo Matisse & Sadko, who were also members of the record label. The song was the 100th release for the Size Records. In January 2014, the Size Records website and artwork were redesigned by Rebels Studios, with all album artwork using the Trade Gothic Bold Extended font. A month later Steve Angello released his first song since "SLVR" called "Payback" with fellow Swedish artists Dimitri Vangelis & Wyman. Later that year, in March, Size Records gave away the first 100 releases of for free, as a promotional offer, via Google Play in the US, and through WeTransfer & Box outside of the US.

=== 2014–2016: Wild Youth ===
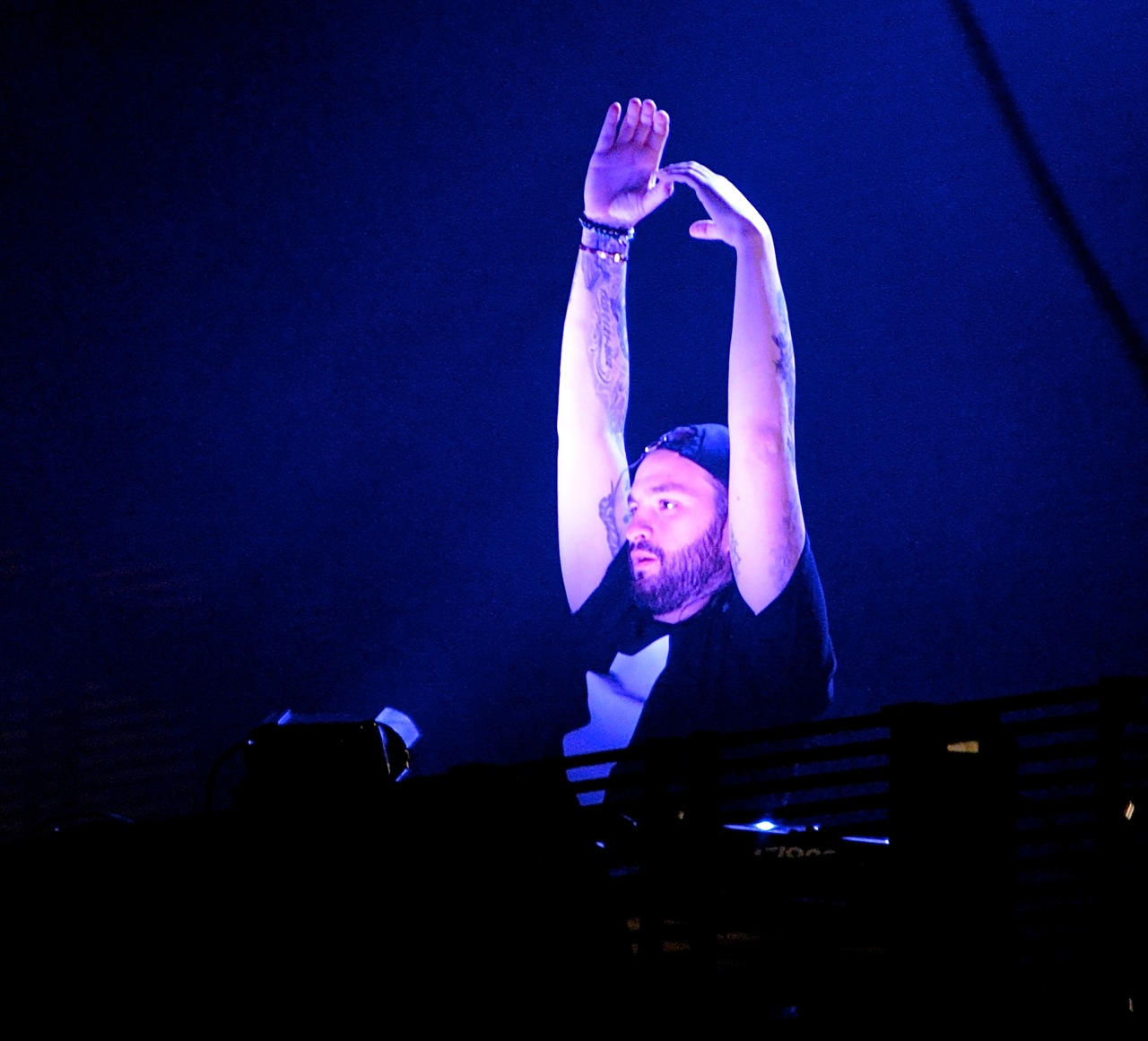
Steve Angello performing at i Kungsträdgården 2014

In 2014, Angello had said he is looking to expand the label into further genres, once it "becomes solid". He also said that he would be expanding Size Records, and was planning to release a new album, to be called Wild Youth. The album's first single, "Wasted Love", was released on 22 July 2014, and featured vocals from Australian singer Dougy of the indie rock band The Temper Trap. In 2015, the album second single was released. "Children of the Wild" featured production work from Mako and was available on 16 September. This was followed two months later by the album's third single "Remember" featuring Australian electronic musicians The Presets, and was released on 1 November 2015. Quickly followed were the album's fourth, fifth, and sixth singles which were all released together on the same day. "Tiger", "The Ocean", and "Prisoner" were all released on 20 November 2015, and served as a consolation as the album itself was initially scheduled for release on that day. The album was later released on 22 January 2016.

=== 2017–present: Human and Swedish House Mafia reunion ===
In April 2017, Angello played new songs at Coachella 2017, including a demo with vocals from Brandon Flowers from The Killers, which was released, on 22 March 2018 with vocals from Sam Martin, as "Nothing Scares Me Anymore". Angello confirmed that the vocals from Flowers which was being saved for a different track will not be featured on his forthcoming album. Prior to this, throughout 2017, Angello released six singles in a series of "Acts", the first Genesis was released on 4 August, with Inferno being released two months later on 13 October. The final act came in the form of Paradiso and was released on 16 November 2017. The songs from Genesis, Inferno, and Paradiso along with "Nothing Scares Me Anymore" would feature on Angello's second studio album Human, which was released through Size Records on 27 April 2018.

One month prior to the album's release, Angello unexpectedly cancelled a weekend of tour dates in Asia during the weekend of Ultra Miami 2018. This came after heavy speculation of a Swedish House Mafia reunion at the festival, exactly five years after the supergroup left the music scene. After more speculation and a 30-minute production break, the trio made their reunion on the last day of the festival as the closing set. Continuing from this, Angello later confirmed that Swedish House Mafia would undergo a world tour in 2019.

== Personal life ==
Angello is a childhood friend of fellow Swedish House Mafia member Sebastian Ingrosso, meeting at age six.

In 2013, Angello married Swedish model and TV personality Isabel Adrian. The couple have two daughters. He currently resides part-time in Los Angeles.

== Discography ==
Studio albums

- Wild Youth (2016)
- Human (2018)

== Awards and nominations ==
=== DJ Awards ===
| Year | Category | Outcome | Ref. |
|---|---|---|---|
| 2005 | Best Newcomer | Won | |
| 2008 | Best House DJ | Nominated | |
| 2009 | Best House DJ | Nominated | |
| 2010 | Best House DJ | Won | |
| 2011 | Best House DJ | Nominated | |
| 2012 | Best Electro House DJ | Nominated | |
| 2013 | Best Electro House DJ | Nominated | |

=== DJ Magazine Top 100 DJs ===
| Year | Position | Notes | Ref. |
|---|---|---|---|
| 2006 | 66 | New Entry | |
| 2007 | 46 | —N/a | |
| 2008 | 63 | —N/a | |
| 2009 | 20 | —N/a | |
| 2010 | 14 | —N/a | |
| 2011 | 23 | —N/a | |
| 2012 | 57 | —N/a | |
| 2013 | 38 | —N/a | |
| 2014 | 26 | —N/a | |
| 2015 | 31 | —N/a | |
| 2016 | 30 | —N/a | |
| 2017 | 82 | —N/a | |
| 2018 | 58 | —N/a | |
| 2019 | 58 | —N/a | |

=== Grammy Awards ===
| Year | Category | Work | Outcome | Ref. |
|---|---|---|---|---|
| 2013 | Best Composers | —N/a | Nominated | |

=== International Dance Music Awards ===
| Year | Category | Work | Outcome | Ref. |
|---|---|---|---|---|
| 2010 | Best Global DJ | —N/a | Nominated | |
| 2011 | Best Electro/Tech House Track | "KNAS" | Nominated | |
| 2014 | Best Progressive House/Electro DJ | —N/a | Nominated | |
| 2016 | Best European DJ | —N/a | Nominated | |

=== YouTube Creator Awards ===
- Steve Angello
  (231 thousand subscribers – May 2020)
