= Run into the Light =

2010 extended play by Ellie Goulding

EP and remix album by Ellie Goulding
- Released: 30 August 2010
- Genre: Electro-pop
- Length: 60:09
- Label: Polydor
- Producers: Russ Chimes; Fear of Tigers; Frankmusik; Jakwob; Alex Metric; Mille; Monsieur Adi; Fraser T Smith; Richard Stannard; Starsmith

Ellie Goulding chronology
Lights (2010)	Run into the Light (2010)	Bright Lights (2010)

Run into the Light is the second extended play by English singer and songwriter Ellie Goulding, released exclusively on the iTunes Store on 30 August 2010 by Polydor Records. The EP consists of six remixes of tracks from Goulding's debut studio album, Lights (2010), four of them being previously unreleased.

To mark her partnership with Nike, Goulding released a 30-minute-long mix titled Run into the Light through iTunes in September 2011. Mixed by Alex Metric, it is intended to be a soundtrack for running.

== Background and promotion ==
On 8 September 2010, Goulding performed an acoustic set at Niketown London for Fashion's Night Out, where she announced a new collaboration with Nike. Around the same time, she had been increasing her presence in the United States following the gradual success of her debut album Lights (2010) and her headlining slot on Nylon's summer music tour. A dedicated runner, Goulding partnered with Nike to produce a short documentary that chronicled her life as both a musician and an athlete, in the lead-up to her participation in the "Nike + Run to the Beat" half marathon in London on 25 September 2010. To accompany the project, she collaborated with British producer Alex Metric on a 30-minute running mix titled Run into the Light, released exclusively through iTunes.

== Reception ==
=== Critical response ===
Time Out noted that her "ethereal electro-pop" lends itself naturally to a running soundtrack, aside from "occasional stripped-down folk ballads". It also highlighted how Nike and Polydor Records used this synergy to promote Run into the Light.

=== Commercial performance ===
Run into the Light peaked number 102 on the UK Albums Chart, while it debuted at number 18 on the UK Album Downloads Chart on 5 September 2010. The following week, it dropped to number 53.

== Track listing ==
Standard edition
No.	Title	Writer(s)	Producer(s)	Length
1.	"Run into the Light Medley"			30:06
2.	"This Love (Will Be Your Downfall)" (Mille remix)	Ellie Goulding; Starsmith	Starsmith; Mille^{[a]}	5:31
3.	"Guns and Horses" (Monsieur Adi remix)	Goulding; John Fortis	Starsmith; Monsieur Adi^{[a]}	4:22
4.	"Lights" (Fear of Tigers remix)	Goulding; Richard Stannard; Ash Howes	Stannard; Howes; Fear of Tigers^{[a]}	4:54
5.	"Salt Skin" (Alex Metric remix)	Goulding; Starsmith	Starsmith; Metric^{[a]}	5:00
6.	"Starry Eyed" (Russ Chimes remix)	Goulding; Jonny Lattimer	Starsmith; Chimes^{[a]}	4:41
7.	"Under the Sheets" (Jakwob remix)	Goulding; Starsmith	Starsmith; Jakwob^{[a]}	5:35
Total length:				60:09

=== Notes ===
- ^{^[a]} signifies a remixer.

== Personnel ==
Credits were adapted from AllMusic.

- Ellie Goulding – composer, primary artist
- Ash Howes – composer
- John Fortis – composer
- Jonny Lattimer – composer
- Richard "Biff" Stannard – composer
- Starsmith – composer

== Charts ==
Chart (2010)	Peak position
UK Albums Chart (OCC)	102

== Release history ==
Region	Date	Format	Label	Ref.
United Kingdom	30 August 2010	Digital Download; streaming	Polydor	
