= Bright Lights (Ellie Goulding album) =

Studio album (reissue) by Ellie Goulding
- Released: 26 November 2010
- Studios: The Pool & The Square (London)
- Length: 62:10
- Label: Polydor
- Producers: Richard "Biff" Stannard; Ash Howes; Starsmith; Liam Howe; Fred Falke; Rob Blake; Crispin Hunt; Ben Lovett

Ellie Goulding chronology
Run into the Light (2010)	Bright Lights (2010)	Halcyon (2012)

Singles from Bright Lights
- 1. "Your Song" Released: 12 November 2010; 2. "Lights" Released: 13 March 2011

Bright Lights is a reissue of English singer-songwriter Ellie Goulding's debut studio album, Lights (2010). Released on 29 November 2010 through Polydor Records, it includes seven new tracks from Lights along with two singles: a cover version of Elton John's "Your Song", and the original album's title track, "Lights".

== Singles ==
The reissue's lead single was Goulding's cover of Elton John's "Your Song" (1970), released on 12 November 2010. It peaked number two on the UK Singles Chart. In the United Kingdom, it was featured in the 2010 John Lewis Christmas advert. On 13 March 2011, "Lights" was released as the second single from Bright Lights. It peaked at number 49 in the United Kingdom. In the United States and Canada, the song was released on 23 May, and it reached numbers two and seven on the Billboard Hot 100 and Canadian Hot 100, respectively. As of June 2013, "Lights" had sold four million copies in the United States.

== Critical reception ==
Professional ratings
Review scores
Source	Rating
AllMusic	3.5/5 stars
Daily Express	3/5

Jon O'Brien of AllMusic noted that while Bright Lights "may not offer anything particularly new", it's "a consistently enjoyable addition to her catalog". Simon Gage from Daily Express noted that it is "all in the same very high-quality vein", praising Goulding's vocal. However, Gage criticised that "it's not clear why she didn't come up with a couple more songs and a totally fresh album".

== Track listing ==
All tracks in the standard edition were produced by Starsmith, except where noted.

Standard edition
No.	Title	Writer(s)	Producer(s)	Length
1.	"Guns and Horses"	Ellie Goulding; John Fortis		3:35
2.	"Starry Eyed"	Goulding; Jonny Lattimer		2:56
3.	"This Love (Will Be Your Downfall)"	Goulding; Starsmith		3:53
4.	"Under the Sheets"	Goulding; Starsmith		3:44
5.	"The Writer"	Goulding; Lattimer		4:11
6.	"Every Time You Go"	Goulding; Fortis; Starsmith		3:25
7.	"Wish I Stayed"	Goulding	Frankmusik	3:40
8.	"Your Biggest Mistake"	Goulding; Fraser T. Smith	Smith	3:25
9.	"I'll Hold My Breath"	Goulding; Starsmith		3:45
10.	"Salt Skin"	Goulding; Starsmith		4:17
11.	"Lights" (single version)	Goulding; Stannard; Howes	Stannard; Howes	3:32
12.	"Human"	Goulding; Starsmith		4:09
13.	"Little Dreams"	Goulding; Liam Howe	Howe	3:18
14.	"Home"	Goulding; Fred Falke	Falke	3:24
15.	"Animal"	Goulding; Starsmith		3:40
16.	"Believe Me"	Goulding; Crispin Hunt; Rob Blake	Blake^{[a]}; Hunt^{[a]}; Falke	4:03
17.	"Your Song" (bonus track)	Elton John; Bernie Taupin	Ben Lovett	3:10
Total length:				62:10

iTunes Store deluxe edition
No.	Title	Writer(s)	Length
18.	"The End" (acoustic)	Goulding	4:15
19.	"Lights" (live at the iTunes Festival)	Goulding; Stannard; Howes	5:18
20.	"Every Time You Go" (live at the iTunes Festival)	Goulding; Fortis; Starsmith	3:40
21.	"This Love (Will Be Your Downfall)" (live at the iTunes Festival)	Goulding; Starsmith	3:59
22.	"Your Biggest Mistake" (live at the iTunes Festival)	Goulding; Smith	3:24
23.	"The Writer" (live at the iTunes Festival)	Goulding; Lattimer	4:09
24.	"Wish I Stayed" (live at the iTunes Festival)	Goulding	4:26
25.	"I'll Hold My Breath" (live at the iTunes Festival)	Goulding; Starsmith	3:47
26.	"Roscoe" (live at the iTunes Festival)	Tim Smith	3:27
27.	"Guns and Horses" (live at the iTunes Festival)	Goulding; Fortis	3:42
28.	"Salt Skin" (live at the iTunes Festival)	Goulding; Starsmith	5:10
29.	"Under the Sheets" (live at the iTunes Festival)	Goulding; Starsmith	3:55
30.	"Starry Eyed" (live at the iTunes Festival)	Goulding; Lattimer	3:48
31.	"Under the Sheets" (video)		3:53
32.	"Starry Eyed" (video)		3:05
33.	"Guns and Horses" (video)		3:42
34.	"The Writer" (video)		3:57
35.	"Your Song" (video)		3:20

== Personnel ==
Credits were adapted from the liner notes.

=== Recording Locations ===
- The Pool & The Square; London (track 17)
- Starsmith's bedroom; Bromley (all tracks on Lights)

=== Musicians ===
- Ellie Goulding – vocals (all tracks); guitar (track 11); acoustic guitar (track 13, 18); mandolin (track 13)
- Steve Malcolmson – programming (track 11)
- Richard "Biff" Stannard – bass, keyboards (track 11)
- Ash Howes – drums, keyboards (track 11)
- Starsmith – programming, acoustic guitar, bass, electric guitar, backing vocals (tracks 12, 15)
- Joe Clegg – drums (track 12)
- Liam Howe – programming, all other instruments (track 13)
- Crispin Hunt – guitar, keyboards (tracks 14, 16)
- Fred Falke – keyboards, drum programming (tracks 14, 16); bass (track 14); guitar (track 16)
- Ruth de Turberville – cello, backing vocals (track 17)
- Ben Lovett – piano, backing vocals, kick drum (track 17)
- Matt Wiggins – timpani (track 17)

=== Technical ===
- Richard "Biff" Stannard – production, mixing (track 11)
- Ash Howes – production, mixing (track 11)
- Starsmith – production (tracks 12, 15)
- Jeremy Wheatley – mixing (tracks 12, 14, 16)
- Richard Edgeler – mixing assistance (tracks 12, 14, 16)
- Julian Kindred – engineering (track 12)
- Liam Howe – production, mixing, engineering (track 13)
- Fred Falke – production (tracks 14, 16)
- Rob Blake – original production (track 16)
- Crispin Hunt – original production (track 16)
- Ben Lovett – production (track 17)
- Matt Lawrence – engineering, mixing (track 17)
- Naweed – mastering

=== Artwork ===
- Scott Trindle – photography
- Traffic – design

== Charts ==
Weekly chart performance
Chart (2012–2013)	Peak position
Austrian Albums (Ö3 Austria)	56
Belgian Albums (Ultratop Flanders)	179

== Release history ==
List of release dates and formats
Region	Date	Format(s)	Label	Ref.
Ireland	26 November 2010	CD; digital download; streaming	Polydor	
United Kingdom	29 November 2010	CD; digital download; streaming	Polydor	
Sweden	20 December 2010	CD; digital download; streaming	Universal	
Germany	21 December 2010	CD; digital download; streaming	Universal	
Italy	6 January 2011	CD; digital download; streaming	Universal	
Netherlands	7 January 2011	CD; digital download; streaming	Universal	
Poland	1 July 2011	CD; digital download; streaming	Universal	
