= Jonny Lattimer =

British songwriter

Jonny Lattimer is a songwriter, musician, and producer, who first came to prominence through his work with Ellie Goulding. Jonny co-wrote with Goulding two singles which appear on her double platinum-selling debut album, Lights. Those singles are the Starsmith-produced UK top five "Starry Eyed", which went on to become a global hit, and "The Writer". In addition, Lattimer co-wrote "Figure 8", which was the second single taken from her second studio album Halcyon.

Lattimer also co-wrote The X Factor finalist Rebecca Ferguson's song "Backtrack", which was taken as the lead single from the deluxe edition of her debut album Heaven (2012).

He went on to co-write "I Know" with Tom Odell (Columbia) which was put out as the fifth single from Odell's debut studio album, Long Way Down (2013).

Since then Lattimer has written with or for a variety of international artists and, most recently, has been in the studio working with Luke Sital Singh, Frances, Nina Nesbitt, Kwabs, James Bay, Max Marshall, Joel Compass, Rag'n'Bone Man, Ella Eyre, Bipolar Sunshine, Bondax, Moko, Sinead Harnett, Rebecca Ferguson, Willy Moon, Sam Smith, Becky Hill, Kimberly Ann, Will Heard, Rina Sawayama, and James Morrison.

In 2024, Lattimer co-wrote Black Swan with Victoria Canal and won the Ivor Novello Award for Best Song Musically and Lyrically.
