= Teen Spirit (soundtrack) =

Teen Spirit (Original Motion Picture Soundtrack)

Soundtrack album by Elle Fanning
- Released: April 5, 2019
- Genre: Pop; dance-pop
- Length: 41:38
- Label: Interscope
- Producer: Jack Antonoff; Matthew Wilder; Grimes; Major Lazer; DJ Snake; Marius de Vries; Eldad Guetta; Lee McCutcheon; P&P Hartnoll

Singles from Teen Spirit (Original Motion Picture Soundtrack)
- 1. "Dancing on My Own" Released: March 13, 2019; 2. "Wildflowers" Released: March 29, 2019

Teen Spirit (Original Motion Picture Soundtrack) is the soundtrack album accompanying the film of the same name released on April 5, 2019 by Interscope Records. The album featured 14-tracks with most of them were performed by the lead actress Elle Fanning, while also had music from Major Lazer, Grimes, Orbital, MØ and DJ Snake amongst others.

== Background ==
The musical selections were picked by the composer Marius de Vries, who was also the music supervisor. Max Minghella intended that "he did not want it to be schizophrenic, like it was a jukebox musical bouncing around to random hits". But wanted it to feel tonally cohesive where each song drives the film forward. On selecting the track "Dancing on My Own" he felt that the song which immediately set a tone about the music that Fanning's character would be performing. Minghella worked with Jack Antonoff for the soundtrack, who revealed that "[he] had seen the movie somehow and really liked it. He wanted to meet for a drink, and he was really enthusiastic about the movie. I asked him if he wanted to do a song, and he showed me something that he and Carly Rae [Jepsen] had worked on. It was such a quick yes. I think even Jack was like, "I don't know if this is the right song." I was like, "No, this is literally what I've been looking for the entire time." It's a song that you'll know how to sing the chorus within a minute and a half."

== Singles ==
The track list of the album was announced on March 13, 2019. At the same date, the cover of Robyn's 2010 single "Dancing On My Own" performed by Elle Fanning (as showcased in the film's trailer) was released in digital platforms. Though Fanning's performance was not released, a three-minute video that accompanied the film's stills were released on Interscope Records' YouTube channel. On March 29, 2019, Carly Rae Jespen's unreleased track "Wildflowers" was unveiled as a single, which was performed by Fanning. A music video featuring Fanning was released on April 5 to promote the soundtrack. On April 18, another music video on Fanning's performance of "Little Bird" was released through YouTube. It was directed by filmmaker Gia Coppola.

== Release history ==
The 14-song soundtrack for Teen Spirit was released by Interscope Records, a week ahead of the film's release on April 5. A vinyl edition of the film's soundtrack was distributed by Mondo which released the album on August 9, 2019.

Release dates and formats for Teen Spirit (Original Motion Picture Soundtrack)
Region	Date	Format(s)	Label	Ref.
Various	April 5, 2019	CD; digital download; streaming	Interscope	
Various	August 9, 2019	Vinyl	Interscope	

== Track listing ==
No.	Title	Performer(s)	Length
1.	"Genesis"	Grimes	4:17
2.	"I Was a Fool"	Elle Fanning	1:10
3.	"E.T."	Fanning; Marius de Vries; Eldad Guetta	1:49
4.	"Just a Girl"	No Doubt	3:29
5.	"Dancing on My Own"	Fanning	3:40
6.	"Lights"	Fanning	3:43
7.	"Little Bird"	Fanning	4:02
8.	"Lean On"	Major Lazer; MØ; DJ Snake	2:58
9.	"Good Time"	Fanning; Teen Spirit finalists	2:06
10.	"Teenage Kicks"	The Shades	1:40
11.	"Tattooed Heart"	Clara Rugaard	2:53
12.	"Don't Kill My Vibe"	Fanning	3:10
13.	"Halycon"	Orbital; Fanning	3:09
14.	"Wildflowers"	Fanning	3:31
Total length:			41:37

== Reception ==
While the film received mixed reviews, the soundtrack was well received by audiences. "Minghella does a nice job staging the competition and making each one feel like a music video. He has a strong sense of visuals, and it helps that the film features the recognizable music of Katy Perry, Ariana Grande, Ellie Goulding, Annie Lennox, Tegan & Sara, Major Lazer and many more popular artists, which should up the buzz factor just a bit. Music supervisor Steven Gizicki deserves credit for curating the soundtrack, and the film boasts a score from Marius De Vries, who served as the music director on both Moulin Rouge and La La Land. Indeed, the latter film shares a producer (Fred Berger) in common with Teen Spirit, which also debuts an original song from Jack Antonoff titled "Wildflowers"." Jeannette Catsoulis of The New York Times praised Fanning's singing, saying "The music might belong to Robyn and Ellie Goulding, but the journey from insecure child to tentative adult is all hers." Owen Gilberman of Variety wrote "a soundtrack of ecstatic up-to-the-minute EDM, though it also finds room for such delectable chestnuts as Ellie Goulding's "Lights" and even "Flashdance... What a Feeling".
