= Good Thing (Zedd and Kehlani song) =

2019 single by Zedd and Kehlani

Single by Zedd and Kehlani
- Released: 27 September 2019
- Genre: Pop; electronic; jazz; soul
- Length: 3:30
- Label: Interscope
- Songwriters: Anton Zaslavski; Cleo Tighe; Finlay Dow-Smith; Peter Rycroft; Kehlani Parrish
- Producers: Zedd; Starsmith; LostBoy

Zedd singles chronology
"365" (2019)	"Good Thing" (2019)	"Funny" (2020)

Kehlani singles chronology
"Change" (2019)	"Good Thing" (2019)	"Ride" (2019)

Music video
- "Good Thing" on YouTube

"Good Thing" is a song by German music producer Zedd and American singer and songwriter Kehlani, released on 27 September 2019 through Interscope Records. The pop, jazz, electronic and soul track was written by Zedd and Kehlani with Cleo Tighe, Starsmith and Lost Boy.

== Promotion ==
Zedd and Kehlani posted a picture of themselves in a studio in August 2019, which led to rumours of a collaboration. Zedd officially announced the collaboration on 20 September, sharing a snippet of the track on social media.

== Charts ==
Weekly chart performance for "Good Thing"
Chart (2019–2020)	Peak position
Australia (ARIA)	58
Belgium (Ultratip Bubbling Under Flanders)	23
Belgium (Ultratip Bubbling Under Wallonia)	25
Canada Hot 100 (Billboard)	91
Czech Republic Airplay (ČNS IFPI)	71
Greece International Digital (IFPI Greece)	56
Ireland (IRMA)	61
Japan Hot 100 (Billboard)	60
Lithuania (AGATA)	37
Netherlands (Dutch Top 40)	40
New Zealand Hot Singles (RMNZ)	8
Russia Airplay (TopHit)	52
Singapore (RIAS)	22
Slovakia Singles Digital (ČNS IFPI)	81
UK Singles (OCC)	92
US Bubbling Under Hot 100 (Billboard)	23
US Pop Airplay (Billboard)	25

Annual chart rankings for "Good Thing"
Chart (2019)	Rank
Tokyo (Tokio Hot 100)	28

== Certifications ==
Certification for "Good Thing"
Region	Certification	Certified units/sales
Australia (ARIA)	Platinum	70,000^{‡}
New Zealand (RMNZ)	Platinum	30,000^{‡}
^{‡} Sales+streaming figures based on certification alone.
