= Leave Me Slowly =

Single by Starsmith
- Released: August 16, 2024
- Genre: Electronic
- Length: 2:47
- Label: Headrooms Records; Another Rhythm Records
- Songwriters: Finlay Dow-Smith; Ellie Goulding; Sarah Troy
- Producer: Starsmith

Starsmith singles chronology
"Give Me a Break/Knucklebuster" (2010)	"Leave Me Slowly" (2024)

Music video
- "Leave Me Slowly (Visualiser)" on YouTube

"Leave Me Slowly" is a song by the English record producer, DJ and songwriter Starsmith. It was released on 16 August 2024 through Another Rhythm and Headroom Records. It marks his first release since his double single "Give Me a Break"/"Knucklebuster" in 2010. It features uncredited vocals by the English singer-songwriter and long-time collaborator Ellie Goulding. It was produced by Starsmith, and written by Dow-Smith, Goulding, and Sarah Troy.

== Background ==
Speaking with Will Vance of Magnetic Magazine, Dow-Smith described the process of how he created the song. He revelead that the instrumental he used included an upright piano, a synth, a granulator plugin and multi-band distortion plugin.

"A piano sound like this probably isn’t the first thing you’d go to in a dance track, but it gave the song a bed that I was able to work on top of with smaller details and avoid some of the more obvious sounds I might have gone for."

— Starsmith, for Magnetic Magazine

== Promotion ==
Starsmith started posting snippets of the song on January 10, throughout his social medias. On June 13, he eventually posted the "sketch" version of the song on his SoundCloud account. Slowed and sped versions of the track were made available exclusively on TikTok and Instagram. A visualizer was released the same day of the song's release on Another Rhythm's YouTube channel.

== Reception ==
The song was met with positive reviews by music critics. Dork Magazine stated that the song wasn't just a track, but "a time machine with a fresh coat of paint", also praised Smith and Goulding partnership stating that "In an industry where reunions are often more about nostalgia than innovation, Goulding's link-up with Starsmith feels like a homecoming we didn't know we needed". Jucilene Barbosa for Pop Now said that the track "captures the essence of what brought Starsmith and Goulding together in the first place: a passion for creating music that touches the soul and makes us dance."

== Track listing ==
Digital download and streaming - Single

1. "Leave Me Slowly" — 2:47

Digital download and streaming - okgiorgio Remix

1. "Leave Me Slowly" (okgiorgio Remix) — 4:22

Digital download and streaming - Babsy. Remix

1. "Leave Me Slowly" (Babsy. Remix) — 2:24

Digital download and streaming - (Remixes) EP

1. "Leave Me Slowly" — 2:47
2. "Leave Me Slowly" (Bag Raiders Remix) — 5:04
3. "Leave Me Slowly" (Babsy. Remix) — 2:24
4. "Leave Me Slowly" (okgiorgio Remix) — 4:22
5. "Leave Me Slowly" (MadTom Remix) — 2:57
6. "Leave Me Slowly" (rabanis Remix) — 1:48
7. "Leave Me Slowly" (CLV Remix) — 2:55

== Release history ==
Release dates and formats for "Leave Me Slowly"
Region	Date	Format	Label	Version	Ref.
Various	16 August 2024	Digital download; streaming	Headroom Records; Another Rhythm	Single	
Various	22 November 2024	Digital download; streaming	Headroom Records; Another Rhythm	okgiorgio Remix	
Various	3 January 2025	Digital download; streaming	Headroom Records; Another Rhythm	Babsy. Remix	
Various	31 January 2025	Digital download; streaming	Headroom Records; Another Rhythm	Remixes	

== See also ==
- List of songs recorded by Ellie Goulding
