= Cloves (singer) =

Australian singer-songwriter

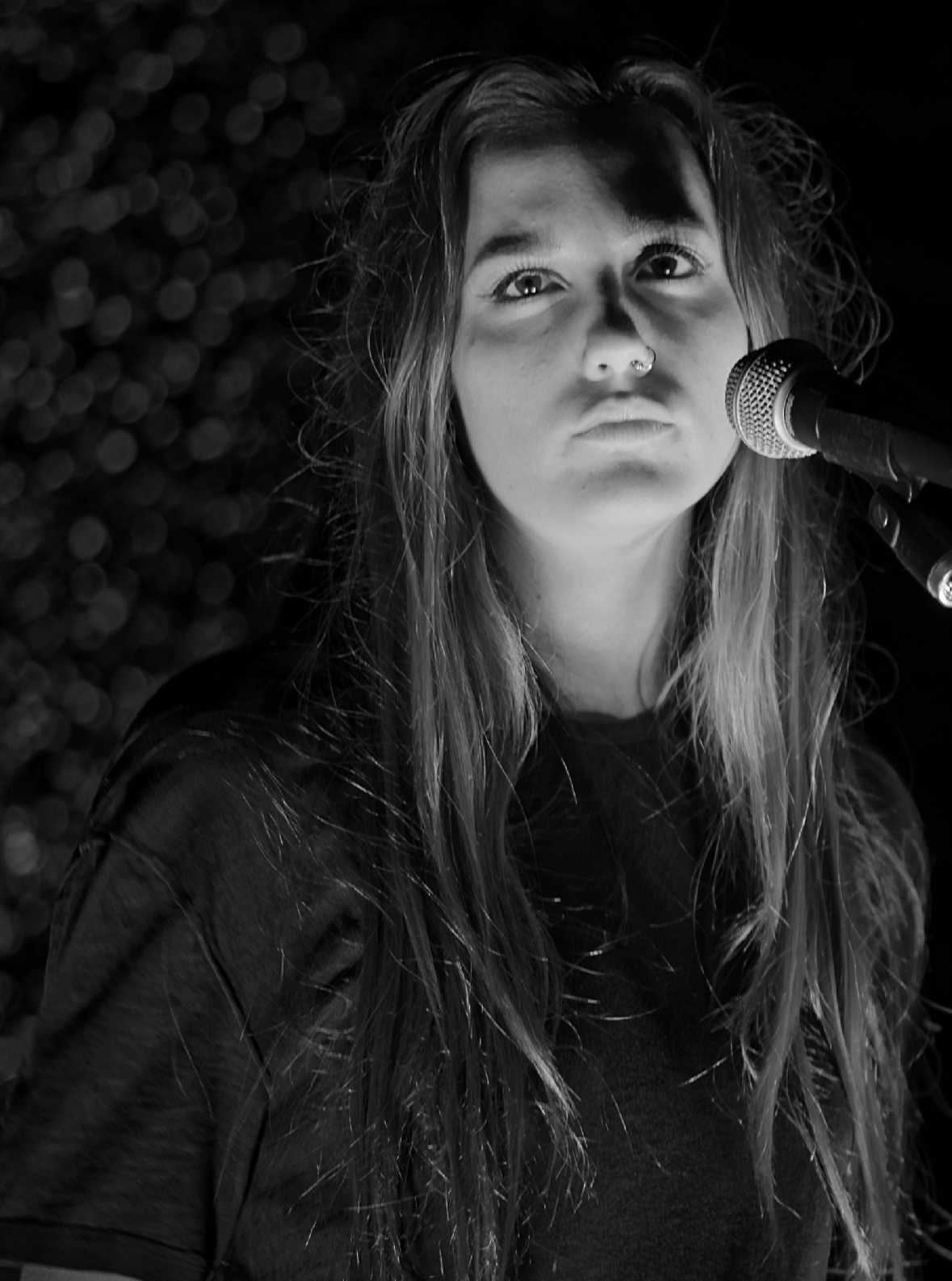

Background information
- Born: Melbourne, Australia
- Occupations: Singer; songwriter
- Instrument: Vocals
- Years active: 2013–present
- Labels: Universal Music Australia; Island Records Australia; Interscope Records

Kaitlyn Elyse Dunstan, known by her stage name Cloves (stylised CLOVES) and initially known as Kaity Dunstan, is an Australian singer-songwriter.

== Background ==
=== Early life and The Voice ===
Dunstan began performing at age thirteen with her sister in local bars and pubs. She wrote her first song at age eleven. She appeared in season two of The Voice Australia in 2013, singing Melanie's "Brand New Key" during her audition. The song peaked at number 40 on the ARIA singles chart. She was later eliminated during the battle rounds after performing "Girls Just Wanna Have Fun".

Round	Song	Original artist	Order	Result
The Blind Auditions	"Brand New Key"	Melanie	1	All judges offered to coach Dunstan chose to join Team Ricky
Battle Rounds	"Girls Just Want to Have Fun" (vs. Nick Kingswell)	Cyndi Lauper	6	Eliminated

=== 2015–present ===
In 2015, under the new moniker Cloves, which was inspired by a trip to Bali, she released her first track "Frail Love". Later, she released her debut single, "Don't You Wait", off her debut EP, XIII. Another track, called "Everybody's Son", was also released. The song was featured in The Vampire Diaries, Season 7, episode 20. On 20 November 2015, she released her EP XIII through Universal Music Australia, which includes all previous songs and a track called "Don't Forget About Me". The song was featured on the soundtrack of the 2016 film Me Before You and released as a single on 22 June 2018, with the music video being released the next day.

She performed at the Coachella and Lollapalooza music festivals in 2016. On 18 November 2016, Cloves released the lead single of her debut album, entitled "Better Now". On 19 May 2017, she released the second single, "California Numb". On 1 February 2018, the third single, "Bringing the House Down", was released. Later that year, on 25 May 2018, the fourth single, "Wasted Time", was released. "Hit Me Hard", the fifth single of the album, was released on 24 August 2018. Her debut album, One Big Nothing, was released on 28 September 2018. The album contains ten songs overall, three of those being new songs, two being rearranged versions of "Frail Love" and "Don't You Wait", and the rest being the previous singles.

== Discography ==
=== Studio albums ===
Title	Details
One Big Nothing	Release: 28 September 2018; Label: Island Records Australia; Formats: Digital download, streaming
Nightmare on Elmfield Road	Release: 21 May 2021; Label: Interscope Records; Formats: Digital download, streaming

=== Extended plays ===
Title	Details
XIII	Released: 20 November 2015; Label: Universal Music Australia; Format: Digital download, streaming
HER	Released: 8 December 2023; Label: Red Cherry Records; Format: Digital download, streaming
Bittersweet Melancholia	Released: TBA; Label: Red Cherry Records; Format: Digital download, streaming

=== Singles ===
==== As lead artist ====
List of singles as lead artist, with selected chart positions, showing year released and album name
Title	Year	Peak chart positions		Album
Title	Year	AUS	US Rock	Album
"Brand New Key" (Note: Credited as Kaity Dunstan.)	2013	40	—	Non-album single
"Don't You Wait"	2015	—	—	XIII
"Don't Forget About Me"	2016	—	34	XIII
"Better Now"	2016	—	—	One Big Nothing
"California Numb"	2017	—	—	One Big Nothing
"Bringing the House Down"	2018	—	—	One Big Nothing
"Wasted Time"	2018	—	—	One Big Nothing
"Hit Me Hard"	2018	—	—	One Big Nothing
"Dead"	2020	—	—	Nightmare on Elmfield Road
"Sicko"	2021	—	—	Nightmare on Elmfield Road
"Manic"	2021	—	—	Nightmare on Elmfield Road
"Nightmare"	2021	—	—	Nightmare on Elmfield Road
"Good Try"	2023	—	—	HER
"Care"	2023	—	—	HER
"Ugly Feelings"	2023	—	—	HER
"Graveyard"	2023	—	—	HER
"The Thought of You" (Note: Stylized in all lower caps.)	2025	—	—	Bittersweet Melancholia
"No Us"	2025	—	—	Non-album single

==== As featured artist ====
List of singles as featured artist, showing year released and album name
Title	Year	Peak chart positions	Album
Title	Year	US Dance	Album
"Out of the Blue" (Note: Credited as Kaity Dunstan.) (Joelistics featuring Kaity Dunstan)	2014	—	Blue Volumes
"Erase / Rewind" (Power-Haus with Christian Reindl featuring Cloves)	2024	—	Non-album singles
"The End of the Earth" (Power-Haus with Christian Reindl featuring Cloves)	2024	—	Non-album singles
"Focus" (John Summit featuring Cloves)	2025	5	Non-album singles
"California" (Netsky featuring Cloves) (Note: Credited as a main artist on iTunes and Apple Music.)	2025	—	Non-album singles
"Old Friend" (Robin Schulz featuring Cloves)	2025	—	Non-album singles

=== Promotional singles ===
List of promotional singles, showing year released and album name
Title	Year	Album
"Frail Love"	2015	XIII
"Everybody's Son"	2015	XIII
"Blowin' in the Wind"	2019	Non-album promotional singles
"Gone"	2020	Non-album promotional singles
"Where Is My Mind?"	2023	Impact Winter 2 (Original Soundtrack)
"Crash"	2024	Impact Winter 3 (Original Soundtrack)

=== Other appearances ===
List of other appearances, showing year released and album name
Title	Year	Album
"Moving Forward"	2023	Impact Winter 2 (Original Soundtrack)
"Insane" (Bakermat featuring Cloves)	2023	From a Bakermat Point Of View
"Who I'm Not" (Tinlicker featuring Cloves)	2024	Cold Enough For Snow
"Tired"	2024	Impact Winter 3 (Original Soundtrack)
"Who I'm Not (Mixed)" (Tinlicker featuring Cloves)	2024	Tinlicker at CRSSS Festival Fall 2024: Ocean View (DJ Mix)
"Focus (Mixed)" (John Summit featuring Cloves)	2025	Experts Only #021 (DJ Mix)
"Focus (Mixed)" (John Summit featuring Cloves)	2025	Experts Only #023 (DJ Mix)

=== Music videos ===
==== As lead artist ====
Title	Year	Director(s)
"Don't Forget About Me"	2016	—N/a
"Better Now"	2017	Phillip Lopez
"California Numb"	2017	Phillip Lopez
"Bringing the House Down"	2018	Sophie Muller
"Dead"	2020	Daniel Carberry & Carly Cussen
"Sicko"	2021	Daniel Carberry & Carly Cussen

==== As featured artist ====
Title	Year	Main artist	Director
"Out of the Blue"	2014	Joelistics	Rhys Graham
"Focus"	2025	John Summit	John Summit & Shailee Ben-David
"Old Friend"	2025	Robin Schulz	Julian Kleinert & Amelie Siegmund

== Awards and nominations ==
=== APRA Music Awards ===
The APRA Music Awards were established by Australasian Performing Right Association (APRA) in 1982 to honour the achievements of songwriters and music composers, and to recognise their song writing skills, sales and airplay performance, by its members annually.

Year	Nominee / work	Award	Result	Ref.
2026	"Focus" by John Summit featuring Cloves (Kaity Dunstan / Abraham Dertner / Frederik Geuze / Neil Ormandy / John Schuster)	Most Performed Dance/Electronic Work	Nominated	
