= Guns and Horses =

Single by Ellie Goulding

from the album Lights
- Released: 17 May 2010
- Recorded: 2009
- Genre: Electro-folk; synth-pop
- Length: 3:35
- Label: Polydor
- Songwriters: Ellie Goulding; John Fortis
- Producer: Starsmith

Ellie Goulding singles chronology
"Starry Eyed" (2010)	"Guns and Horses" (2010)	"The Writer" (2010)

Music video
- "Guns and Horses" on YouTube

"Guns and Horses" is a song by English singer and songwriter Ellie Goulding from her debut studio album, Lights (2010) as its opening track. The song was released digitally on 17 May 2010 and physically the day after as the album's third single.

== Background ==
Regarding the meaning behind "Guns and Horses", Goulding told Sky Songs:

I wrote "Guns and Horses" about a romance that began online hence the lyric 'you found me, at a screen you sit at permanently'. I wanted the guy to feel more than he did for me but through no fault of his own he couldn't. It's a song about frustration essentially. My producer [Starsmith] made me laugh at the end, I can't repeat what he called me though.

The song was used in the sixth episode of the second season of the American television series Drop Dead Diva, "Begin Again", originally aired 18 July 2010.

== Critical reception ==
In a review of Lights, Mark Beaumont of NME wrote that the song "skitters along on bleeps and fizzes, xylophone tinkles and acoustic strumblings." David Renshaw from Drowned in Sound cited the song as the album's stand-out track, stating that it "starts with nothing but a finger picked guitar and basic drum beat. Goulding's voice rasps and commands proceedings as she longs to feel the same for a boy who has feelings for her." Digital Spy music reporter Robert Copsey, giving "Guns and Horses" four out of five stars, referred to the track as "[a]nother example of the glorious folktronic pop sound she and producer Starmith established on 'Under the Sheets' and 'Starry Eyed'—and reassuring proof that her romantic suffering wasn't for nothing."

Stephen Troussé of Pitchfork commented that the song "may be the best opening invitation for travel since 'Two Divided by Zero' kicked off the Pet Shop Boys' Please" and that it "builds from spare acoustics to urgent trance pop—'I left my house, left my clothes, door widen open, heaven knows, but you're so worth it, you are...'—concluding with a desperate a cappella coda, and a brief breathless chuckle at her casual audacity." Fraser McAlpine of the BBC Chart Blog noted that "Ellie still sings it like a frightened woodland nymph, but this is a more ordinary sort of a song than her previous two, and the production—tasteful acoustic, tasteful beats, tasteful synths, tasteful harmonies—struggles to make it shine."

== Music video ==
The music video for "Guns and Horses" was directed by Petro and filmed at Griffith Park in Los Angeles in March 2010. It was shot by director of photography Adam Frisch FSF. It premiered on YouTube on 12 April 2010. The video shows Goulding walking around a forest finding male and female soldiers, and horses. As it gets to the chorus the soldiers become her backing dancers. In each verse, Goulding keeps on walking through the forest, and on the last verse, she finds some flowers. At the end of the music video, Goulding turns the camera around revealing the production of the shoot.

In the video, the female soldiers are wearing white leotards in the style of soldiers, and the male soldiers wear the same, but without leotards. Goulding is wearing a checkered shirt and leggings.

== Track listings ==
UK CD single
No.	Title	Length
1.	"Guns and Horses" (Radio Edit)	3:34
2.	"Guns and Horses" (Neo Tokyo Remix)	5:05
3.	"Guns and Horses" (Jezebel Remix)	4:22

UK digital download – EP
No.	Title	Length
1.	"Guns and Horses" (Radio Edit)	3:33
2.	"Guns and Horses" (Neo Tokyo Remix)	5:05
3.	"Guns and Horses" (Jezebel Remix)	4:20
4.	"Guns and Horses" (Tonka Remix)	5:27

UK limited-edition 7" picture disc
No.	Title	Length
1.	"A. Guns and Horses"	3:34
2.	"B. Guns and Horses" (Neo Tokyo Remix)	4:22

== Credits and personnel ==
Credits were adapted from the liner notes of Lights.

- Ellie Goulding – acoustic guitar, songwriting, vocals
- John Fortis – songwriting
- Naweed – mastering
- Starsmith – bass, drum programming, keyboards, production
- Traffic – design

== Charts ==
"Guns and Horses" chart performance
Chart (2010)	Peak position
Scottish Singles Sales (Official Charts)	25
UK Singles (Official Charts)	26
