= Your Song =

1970 single by Elton John

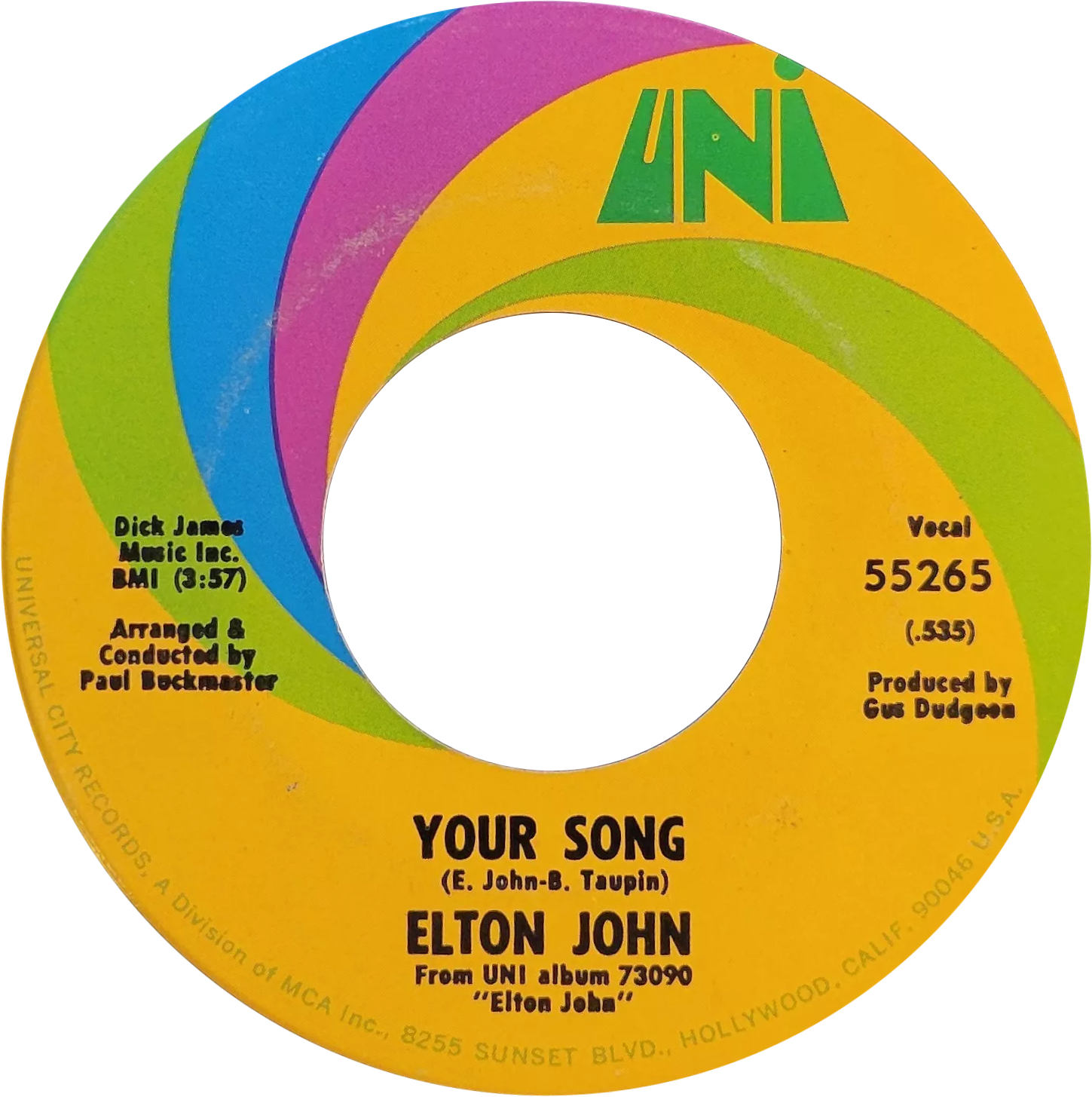
- One of side-A labels of the US single

Single by Elton John

from the album Elton John
- B-side: "Take Me to the Pilot" "Into the Old Man's Shoes"
- Released: 26 October 1970
- Recorded: 22 January 1970
- Studio: Trident, London
- Genre: Traditional pop; soft rock
- Length: 3:57
- Label: Uni; DJM
- Songwriters: Elton John; Bernie Taupin
- Producer: Gus Dudgeon

Elton John singles chronology
"From Denver to L.A." (1970)	"Your Song" (1970)	"Friends" (1971)

Audio video
- "Your Song" on YouTube

"Your Song" is a song written by British musician Elton John and lyricist Bernie Taupin, and performed by John. It was John's first international Top 10 chart single.

"Your Song" was first released by American rock band Three Dog Night in March 1970 as an album track on It Ain't Easy. John was an opening act for the band at the time and allowed them to record it. They did not release it as a single as they wanted to let John, then an upcoming artist, have a go with it. John's version was recorded at Trident Studios in London in January 1970 and appeared in April as the first cut on his self-titled second studio album. Following "Border Song" as the first album single, "Your Song" was released in the United States in October 1970 as the B-side to "Take Me to the Pilot". Both sides received airplay, but "Your Song" was preferred by disc jockeys and replaced "Take Me to the Pilot" as the A-side, eventually making it to number eight on the Billboard chart. The song also peaked at number seven on the UK singles chart, as well as charting in the top 10 in several other countries.

In 1998, "Your Song" was inducted into the Grammy Hall of Fame. In 2004, the song was placed at number 136 on Rolling Stone's list of "The 500 Greatest Songs of All Time", 137 in its 2010 list, and 202 in its 2021 list. The song is listed among the Rock and Roll Hall of Fame's 500 Songs that Shaped Rock and Roll. A demo version was included in John's 1990 box set album To Be Continued. In 2017, the song was voted by the British public as The Nation's Favourite Elton John Song in a UK-wide poll for ITV.

The song has been covered by a number of artists, including Rod Stewart, Lady Gaga and Ellie Goulding. The song was also covered by Ewan McGregor and opera singer Alessandro Safina in the 2001 musical film Moulin Rouge! and by Taron Egerton in the 2019 film Rocketman. In 2024, the song was certified 3× Platinum by the Recording Industry Association of America (RIAA).

== Composition and inspiration ==
One widespread story is that Bernie Taupin wrote the song's lyrics after breakfast one morning on the roof of 20 Denmark Street, London, where John worked for a music publishing firm as an office boy, hence the line "I sat on the roof and kicked off the moss." However, Taupin has denied this, pointing out that John had stopped working there by the time they met, "I scribbled the lyric down on a lined notepad at the kitchen table of Elton's mother's apartment in the London suburb of Northwood Hills, breakfast time sometime in 1969. That’s it. Plain and simple."

The instrumental focus is on John's Leon Russell-influenced piano work, along with acoustic guitar, Paul Buckmaster's string accompaniment, and a shuffling rhythm section.

At times the self-deprecating narrator stumbles to get out his feelings, which despite being a melodramatic device, AllMusic calls "effective and sweet": According to a journal entry on John's official website, he wrote the music for "Your Song" on Monday, 27 October 1969.

"Your Song" was the inspiration for the song "We All Fall in Love Sometimes" on John's 1975 album Captain Fantastic and the Brown Dirt Cowboy.

The song is performed in the key of E-flat major.

== Reception ==
"Your Song" was praised by critics upon its release and in subsequent years, and is widely regarded as one of John's greatest songs. Writing in NME on its release, Derek Johnson wrote, "The song itself is glowing and strangely haunting, the scoring is smooth and delicate and the performance is symptomatic of a new era in pop idols." Bill Janovitz from AllMusic described it as a "near-perfect song".

In a 1975 interview with Rolling Stone, John Lennon recalled,

I remember hearing Elton John's 'Your Song', heard it in America—it was one of Elton's first big hits—and remember thinking, 'Great, that's the first new thing that's happened since we (The Beatles) happened.' It was a step forward. There was something about his vocal that was an improvement on all of the English vocals until then. I was pleased with it."

John Mendelsohn from Rolling Stone called the song a "pretty McCartney-esque ballad". In the 2019 book Elton John: Every Album, Every Song – 1969–1979, author Peter Kearns made the following quote in reference to "Your Song". "The words securely insulate themselves against possible criticism by admitting their ineptitude for the task at hand".

In 2018, The Guardian ranked the song number four on their list of the 50 greatest Elton John songs, and in 2022, Billboard ranked the song number two on their list of the 75 greatest Elton John songs.

== Commercial performance and impact ==
"Your Song" rose to number eight on the Billboard Hot 100 and number seven on the UK Singles Chart by January 1971. In 2002, John re-recorded the song as a duet with Safina for the first Sport Relief charity telethon and released it on 15 July 2002; this version reached number four in the UK. In the US it was certified Gold and Platinum on 13 December 2012 by the Recording Industry Association of America (RIAA) for sales of over one million digital downloads. On 23 July 2021, it was certified 2× Platinum by the British Phonographic Industry (BPI), denoting sales in excess of 1,200,000 digital downloads. In the US in April 2018, it was certified 2× Platinum for sales of two million digital downloads by the Recording Industry Association of America.

In 2020, Canadian singer-songwriter the Weeknd referenced "Your Song" on his song "Scared to Live".

== Track listings ==
- 1970 US 7-inch single
  1. "Take Me to the Pilot" – 3:43
  2. "Your Song" – 3:57
- 1971 UK 7-inch single
  1. "Your Song"
  2. "Into the Old Man's Shoes"
- 1978 UK 7-inch single
  1. "Your Song"
  2. "Border Song"
- 1985 UK 7-inch single
  1. "Cry to Heaven"
  2. "Candy By the Pound"
  3. "Whole Lotta Shakin' Going On/I Saw Her Standing There/Twist and Shout" (live)
  4. "Your Song" (live)
- 1987 UK 7-inch single
  1. "Your Song" (live)
  2. "Don't Let the Sun Go Down on Me" (live)
- 1992 US 7-inch single
  1. "Your Song"
  2. "Border Song"
- 1999 US CD single
  1. "Recover Your Soul" (live) – 4:40
  2. "Your Song" (live) – 4:08
- 2000 US 12-inch single
  1. "We Belong" (S.R.R. mix) by Pat Benatar – 10:39
  2. "Your Song" (Junior's Vasquez mix) – 10:00
- 2002 US CD single
  1. "Your Song" (featuring Alessandro Safina) – 4:19
  2. "Your Song" (instrumental)
  3. "Your Song" (video)

== Credits and personnel ==
Credits adapted from the liner notes of Elton John.

- Elton John – piano, vocals
- Paul Buckmaster – string arrangement, conducting
- Frank Clark – acoustic guitar
- Gus Dudgeon – production
- Colin Green – guitar
- Clive Hicks – 12-string guitar
- Barry Morgan – drums
- Dave Richmond – double bass

== Charts ==
=== Weekly charts ===
Chart (1971)	Peak position
Australia (Kent Music Report)	11
Belgium (Ultratop 50 Flanders)	16
Canada Top Singles (RPM)	3
Canada Adult Contemporary (RPM)	4
Ireland (IRMA)	13
Netherlands (Dutch Top 40)	10
Netherlands (Single Top 100)	4
New Zealand (Listener)	18
UK Singles (Official Charts)	7
US Billboard Hot 100	8
US Adult Contemporary (Billboard)	9
US Cash Box Top 100	8

Chart (1987)	Peak position
UK Singles (Official Charts) Live	85

Chart (2003)	Peak position
US Dance Club Songs (Billboard)	5

Chart (2007)	Peak position
Norway (VG-lista)	10

Chart (2012)	Peak position
France (SNEP)	159

Chart (2013)	Peak position
Austria (Ö3 Austria Top 40)	73

Version with Alessandro Safina
Chart (2002)	Peak position
Canada (Canadian Singles Chart)	8
Ireland (IRMA)	29
Netherlands (Single Top 100)	88
Romania (Romanian Top 100)	52
Scottish Singles Sales (Official Charts)	5
UK Singles (Official Charts)	4

Chart (2010)	Peak position
European Hot 100 Singles (Billboard)	11

=== Year-end charts ===
Chart (1971)	Position
Canada Top Singles (RPM)	75
US Cash Box Top 100	74

Chart (2002)	Position
Canada (Nielsen SoundScan) With Alessandro Safina	117
UK Singles (OCC) With Alessandro Safina	149

== Certifications ==
Certifications for "Your Song"
Region	Certification	Certified units/sales
Austria (IFPI Austria)	Platinum	100,000^{*}
Brazil (Pro-Música Brasil)	Gold	30,000^{‡}
Denmark (IFPI Danmark)	2× Platinum	180,000^{‡}
Germany (BVMI)	Gold	300,000^{‡}
Italy (FIMI) sales since 2009	2× Platinum	200,000^{‡}
Japan (RIAJ) 1996 release	Gold	50,000^{^}
New Zealand (RMNZ)	5× Platinum	150,000^{‡}
Spain (Promusicae)	2× Platinum	120,000^{‡}
United Kingdom (BPI) sales since 2008	4× Platinum	2,400,000^{‡}
United States (RIAA)	3× Platinum	3,000,000^{‡}
^{*} Sales figures based on certification alone.^{^} Shipments figures based on certification alone.^{‡} Sales+streaming figures based on certification alone.

== Notable performances and renditions ==
John has played "Your Song" at almost every live performance during his solo career, and issued several live versions, including with his band, solo on piano and with orchestra. One notable version was during his Central Park concert in 1980, when John was dressed as Donald Duck. John has stated he never tires of playing and considers it a "perfect song."

A live version of John's concert with the Melbourne Symphony Orchestra, recorded on 14 December 1986, was included in his 1987 album Live in Australia with the Melbourne Symphony Orchestra. He also performed "Your Song" live with Ronan Keating at Madison Square Garden, New York, in 2000, the recording of which can be found on Keating's 2010 album Duet. On 20 October 2001, John performed the song with Billy Joel at The Concert for New York City, a tribute show to the September 11 attacks. In 2004, Daniel Bedingfield performed a cover of the song to Elton John at An Ivor Novello Tribute: Elton John. John performed "Your Song" to open the Concert for Diana on 1 July 2007. John and Lady Gaga performed a medley of "Your Song" with Gaga's song "Speechless" at the 52nd Annual Grammy Awards on 31 January 2010. At the 2013 Grammy Awards, Colombian singer Juanes performed a bilingual rendition of "Your Song". Gaga recorded a cover of the song for the 2018 tribute album Revamp: Reimagining the Songs of Elton John & Bernie Taupin.

Cilla Black covered the song on her 1971 album Images.

Soul singer Billy Paul released a version of the song on Philadelphia International in 1972, as the B-side of "Me and Mrs. Jones", then in 1977, which reached number 37 on the UK Singles Chart and spent seven weeks in the top 75. Also in 1972, the song was covered by Finnish band Alwari Tuohitorvi, with Finnish lyrics.

In 1973, Mia Martini released an Italian version of the song on her album Il giorno dopo, under the title "Picnic".

In 2014, singer Aloe Blacc released "The Man" from his 2014 album Lift Your Spirit and the melody of this album hinges on the melody of this song.

In 2018, John starred in the annual Christmas advert of British department store chain John Lewis & Partners, titled "The Boy & the Piano". Set to "Your Song", it featured John reminiscing about his life in reverse, culminating with him receiving a piano for Christmas as a child.

In December 2021, it was reported that the original plan was for John to sing "Your Song" at the funeral of Diana, Princess of Wales, but the final choice was "Candle in the Wind 1997".

== Rod Stewart version ==
"Your Song"

Single by Rod Stewart

from the album Two Rooms: Celebrating the Songs of Elton John & Bernie Taupin
- B-side: "Broken Arrow"
- Released: 6 April 1992
- Length: 4:49
- Label: Warner Bros.
- Composer: Elton John
- Lyricist: Bernie Taupin
- Producer: Trevor Horn

Rod Stewart singles chronology
"People Get Ready" (1992)	"Your Song" (1992)	"Broken Arrow" (1992)

English singer and songwriter Rod Stewart covered "Your Song" for the tribute album Two Rooms: Celebrating the Songs of Elton John & Bernie Taupin (1991). His version was released in April 1992 by Warner Bros. as a double A-side single with "Broken Arrow".

=== Track listings ===
- European CD maxi single and UK 12-inch single
1. "Your Song" – 4:47
2. "Broken Arrow" – 4:11
3. "Mandolin Wind" – 5:27
4. "The First Cut Is the Deepest" – 3:52
- UK and French 7-inch single

A. "Your Song" – 4:47
AA. "Broken Arrow" – 4:11

=== Charts ===
Chart (1992)	Peak position
Canada Top Singles (RPM)	25
Canada Adult Contemporary (RPM)	23
France (SNEP)	38
Netherlands (Single Top 100)	60
UK Singles (Official Charts)	41
UK Airplay (Music Week)	14
US Billboard Hot 100	48
US Adult Contemporary (Billboard)	6

== Ellie Goulding version ==
"Your Song"

Single by Ellie Goulding

from the album Bright Lights
- Released: 12 November 2010
- Length: 3:10
- Label: Polydor
- Composer: Elton John
- Lyricist: Bernie Taupin
- Producer: Ben Lovett

Ellie Goulding singles chronology
"The Writer" (2010)	"Your Song" (2010)	"Wonderman" (2011)

Music video
- "Your Song" on YouTube

The English singer and songwriter Ellie Goulding covered "Your Song" for the reissue of her debut studio album, titled Bright Lights. Produced by Ben Lovett of Mumford & Sons, it was released digitally on 12 November 2010 as the re-release's lead single. The song was featured in the Christmas 2010 television advert for department store chain John Lewis.

Goulding performed "Your Song" at the reception party of Prince William and Catherine Middleton's wedding at Buckingham Palace on 29 April 2011, to which the couple shared their first dance. She also performed the song on Saturday Night Live on 7 May 2011, along with "Lights". Goulding's version was featured at the end of the 29 July 2011 episode of the Syfy supernatural drama series Haven, titled "Love Machine".

=== Critical reception ===
Nick Levine of Digital Spy gave the song four out of five stars, commenting that producer Lovett "shrouds her beautifully fluttery vocals in little but piano and strings, just adding a few harmonies towards the finish, allowing her to draw out the tenderness in Bernie Taupin's lyrics and the utter loveliness of one of Elton John's very best melodies. The result is a quiet, modest triumph, but a triumph nonetheless." Caryn Ganz of Spin magazine opined that her cover is "everything Gaga's Grammy version wasn't—a tender, vulnerable gift". AllMusic critic Jon O'Brien, in his review for Bright Lights, called it "unimaginative" and felt that it "sounds out of place alongside the rest of her rather more adventurous material".

=== Commercial performance ===
"Your Song" debuted at number 39 on the UK Singles Chart for the week of 14 November 2010. The single jumped to number three the following week, selling 84,896 copies. In its third week, it climbed to its peak position of number two (behind The X Factor Finalists 2010's cover of David Bowie's "'Heroes'") on sales of 72,292 copies, becoming Goulding's highest-peaking single until 2013. It maintained its position the following week, selling 63,753 units. The song also topped the UK Singles Downloads Chart for the week ending 11 December 2010.

The single was certified double platinum by the British Phonographic Industry (BPI) on 24 September 2021 and had sold 826,000 copies in the UK by August 2013. Elsewhere, "Your Song" reached number four in Austria, number five in Ireland, number 22 in Denmark, number 25 in Sweden and number 56 in Switzerland.

=== Music video ===
The music video, directed by Ben Coughlan and Max Knight, premiered on YouTube on 14 November 2010. Shot in a home video look, it depicts Goulding's life on the road with friends. Areas from Goulding's hometown of Hereford can be seen throughout the video, including Hereford railway station.

=== Credits and personnel ===
Credits adapted from the liner notes of Bright Lights.

- Ellie Goulding – vocals
- Matt Lawrence – engineering, mixing
- Ben Lovett – backing vocals, kick drum, piano, production
- Ruth de Turberville – backing vocals, cello
- Matt Wiggins – timpani

=== Charts ===
==== Weekly charts ====
Chart (2010–14)	Peak position
Austria (Ö3 Austria Top 40)	4
Czech Republic Airplay (ČNS IFPI)	63
Denmark (Tracklisten)	22
Euro Digital Song Sales (Billboard)	2
France (SNEP)	126
Germany (GfK)	75
Ireland (IRMA)	5
Scottish Singles Sales (Official Charts)	2
Sweden (Sverigetopplistan)	25
Switzerland (Schweizer Hitparade)	56
UK Singles (Official Charts)	2

==== Year-end charts ====
Chart (2010)	Position
UK Singles (OCC)	21

Chart (2011)	Position
UK Singles (OCC)	102

Chart (2013)	Position
Austria (Ö3 Austria Top 40)	56

=== Certifications ===
Certifications for "Your Song (Ellie Goulding version)"
Region	Certification	Certified units/sales
Brazil (Pro-Música Brasil)	Gold	30,000^{‡}
Denmark (IFPI Danmark)	Gold	45,000^{‡}
New Zealand (RMNZ)	Gold	15,000^{‡}
Norway (IFPI Norway)	Platinum	10,000^{*}
United Kingdom (BPI)	2× Platinum	1,300,000
United States (RIAA)	Gold	500,000^{‡}
^{*} Sales figures based on certification alone.^{‡} Sales+streaming figures based on certification alone.

== Lady Gaga version ==
External audio
- "Your Song" by Lady Gaga on YouTube

American singer Lady Gaga recorded a cover of "Your Song" for the 2018 tribute album Revamp: Reimagining the Songs of Elton John & Bernie Taupin. It was released digitally as a promotional single on 30 March 2018. Gaga performed the song at The Recording Academy's tribute concert, titled "Elton John: I'm Still Standing – A Grammy Salute", which aired on CBS on 10 April 2018. In April, during the release of Revamp in Japan (there re-titled Your Song: Elton John Best Hits Cover), Lady Gaga's cover of "Your Song" was widely promoted on the country's radio stations, becoming the most played song on Japanese radio in mid-April. The song reached the top thirty in Hungary, Japan, Mexico, the digital downloads chart of Spain and the US Pop Digital Songs chart.

=== Charts ===
Chart (2018)	Peak position
France Downloads (SNEP)	31
Hungary (Single Top 40)	18
Italy (Musica e Dischi)	27
Japan Hot 100 (Billboard)	27
Japan Hot Overseas (Billboard)	3
Mexico Ingles Airplay (Billboard)	30
Scottish Singles Sales (Official Charts)	79
Spain Downloads (PROMUSICAE)	12
US Pop Digital Songs (Billboard)	21

=== Certifications ===
Certifications for "Your Song (Lady Gaga version)"
Region	Certification	Certified units/sales
Brazil (Pro-Música Brasil)	Gold	20,000^{‡}
^{‡} Sales+streaming figures based on certification alone.
