= Lights (Ellie Goulding album) =

2010 studio album by Ellie Goulding

- UK edition cover

Studio album by Ellie Goulding
- Released: 26 February 2010
- Recorded: 2008–2009
- Studios: Starsmith's bedroom (Bromley, Essex)
- Genres: Pop; folk; synth-pop; EDM
- Length: 36:21
- Label: Polydor
- Producers: Fred Falke; Frankmusik; Liam Howe; Ash Howes; Ben Lovett; Fraser T. Smith; Richard "Biff" Stannard; Starsmith

Ellie Goulding chronology
An Introduction to Ellie Goulding (2009)	Lights (2010)	Run into the Light (2010)

Alternative cover
- US edition cover

Singles from Lights
- 1. "Under the Sheets" Released: 9 November 2009; 2. "Starry Eyed" Released: 21 February 2010; 3. "Guns and Horses" Released: 17 May 2010; 4. "The Writer" Released: 6 August 2010

Lights is the debut studio album by English singer-songwriter Ellie Goulding. It was released on 26 February 2010 by Polydor Records, following the independent issue of its lead single, "Under the Sheets", through Neon Gold Records in 2009. Much of the album was recorded in producer Starsmith's home studio in Bromley, Essex, with additional contributions from producers including Frankmusik and Fraser T. Smith.

Primarily a pop and folk record focusing on synth-pop and EDM, Lights blends acoustic guitar with electronic production and dance rhythms. The songs, many of which originated from Goulding's earlier songwriting, centre on themes of romantic uncertainty and personal reflection. Critics frequently noted the contrast between her hushed, folk-rooted vocal style and the album's glossy electro-pop arrangements. Lights was supported by four singles, including "Starry Eyed", "Guns and Horses" and "The Writer".

Upon release, Lights received mixed reviews from music critics, with commentary often divided between praise for Goulding's distinctive voice and reservations about the album's production and originality. Commercially, the album debuted at number one on the UK Albums Chart and was later certified double platinum by the British Phonographic Industry (BPI). It also charted internationally and, following its 2010 reissue as Bright Lights, gained renewed commercial momentum, particularly in the United States, where it peaked within the top 40 of the Billboard 200. By 2012, the album had sold over 1.6 million copies worldwide.

== Background and development ==
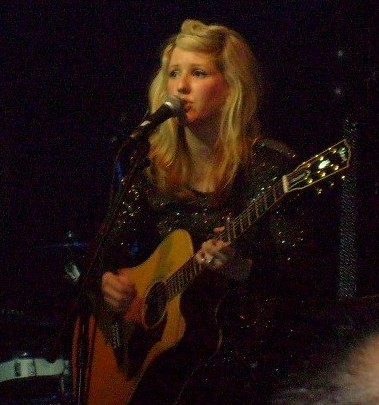
Goulding in 2009

Goulding dropped out of a degree programme at the University of Kent after two years, to pursue her musical career. In an interview for BBC Wales, she said that she had entered a university talent contest, where she was subsequently noticed by several members of the audience. She signed a record deal with Polydor Records in July 2009. However, the lead single "Under the Sheets" was released through an independent label Neon Gold Records, as she would not feel under pressure.

She met chief producer Starsmith after moving to London. In an interview, she explained, "Meeting Starsmith was a godsend. We're like brother and sister. We fight a lot but you can't get anywhere without creative tension." Goulding worked with producers along with Starsmith, including Frankmusik, Fraser T. Smith, Richard Stannard and Ash Howes. The majority of the album was recorded in Starsmith's bedroom in Bromley, Essex.

== Composition ==
Lights is a pop and folk record that mainly focuses on synth-pop and EDM. Goulding stated that the album comprises songs that initially began as guitar-based compositions written over a period of roughly two years, many of which explore themes of romantic triumphs and setbacks. She also indicated in 2010 that the material spans from songs written between the ages of 18 and the time of the album's production. "Wish I Stayed", one of the first songs she ever wrote, is featured on the album.

The stylistic contrasts between folk-oriented songwriting and polished mainstream pop production that shaped Lights were noted by several critics. AllMusic's Matthew Chisling noted that the album strikes a balance between the introspective tendencies of contemporary teen Brit-pop and the more mainstream style exemplified by Girls Aloud and Sugababes. According to The Guardian's Alexis Petridis, Lights "is infinitely more upbeat than Dido's oeuvre", while its beats "tend towards house music's four-to-the-floor thud rather than trip-hop". In a Pitchfork's review, Stephen Troussé suggested that its strongest moments arise when "the contrast between the folk singer and the pop production chimes with the tensions between the pull of home and the allure of the city".

Lights mostly deals with themes of "self-esteem and infatuation", which are "transformed by the electropop arrangements from folksy introspection to mechanical expressions of emotional turmoil", as noted by Andy Gill of The Independent. It blends folk-influenced melodies with electronic production; Jody Rosen from Rolling Stone wrote that the album "places her vocals and minor-key melodies against producer Starsmith's club-ready mix of synths and brisk, busy electro rhythms". Alexis Petridis wrote that Goulding's appeal is "aimed squarely at the middle of the road". David Renshaw of Drowned in Sound suggested that her emotional vocal style is better suited to an acoustic setting than to the "sparkle and glamour of FM pop music". Spin author Caryn Ganz observed that Starsmith "nudged Goulding onto the dance floor", blending folky melodies with "amped-up '80s-style synths and beats", while The Daily Telegraph's Neil McCormick characterised the result as "lush electro-dance".

=== Songs ===
"Under the Sheets"
"Under the Sheets" illustrates its layered vocals and disco-influenced electropop production.

The first track of Lights, "Guns and Horses", adopts folktronic pop elements. In its chorus, Robert Copsey of Digital Spy noted that she "bursts into a glittering microcosm of guitars, xylophones and synths". "Starry Eyed" features folk and dance elements, and she adopts a "more bruised and bitter mood", with producer Starsmith running her vocals "through an Auto-Tune the size of the Large Hadron Collider", according to Emily Mackay from NME. AllMusic's Matthew Chrisling observed "This Love" and "Under the Sheets" "suggest a willingness to indulge her creative side", noting that they take "left-hand turns and unexpected detours" rather than "focusing on sure-fire hits", in contrast to albums such as Do You Want the Truth or Something Beautiful? (2009) by British singer Paloma Faith. Emily Mackay wrote "Under the Sheets" portrays Goulding "love-struck and breathless", set against "disco diva beats and looped soul wails". Nick Levine from Digital Spy noted that it is "bit more magical than the average electropop tune", as it "manag[es] to sound twinkly and chunky at the same time".

According to Pitchfork, a chorus of "The Writer" evokes the "spectre of the Cranberries's Dolores O'Riordan". An Europop song, Troussé compared the backing track of "I'll Hold My Breath" to English duo Wham!'s single, "Last Christmas". He also highlighted "Wish I Stayed"'s lyrics about "skipping ropes, trampolines" and "the carelessness of running away"; Troussé wrote that the track is "reminiscent of the suburban pop of the Sundays". "Animal" is a disco track, while "Your Biggest Mistake" opens "in a subdued and human fashion", according to Renshaw.

== Promotion ==
=== Marketing and packaging ===
The standard edition includes 10 tracks, while the US and Canadian edition additionally features "Lights" as the album's first track. On the European iTunes edition, it is listed as the eleventh track; the release also features videos for "Under the Sheets" and "Starry Eyed", with an AN21 and Max Vangeli remix of the former and a Baby Monster remix of the latter. The UK edition and US edition use different cover artworks. Goulding re-released Lights on 26 November 2010, titled Bright Lights. It contains seven new tracks from the original album including two new singles: "Your Song" and "Lights". On 26 February 2020, she reissued Lights again, to commemorate the album's tenth anniversary. Titled as Lights 10, it features seven bonus tracks from Bright Lights and six remixes from her remix extended play, Run into the Light (2010). (Note: Lights 10 features seven bonus tracks from Bright Lights: "Lights", "Human", "Little Dreams", "Home", "Animal", "Believe Me" and "Your Song", and six remixes from Run into the Light.) She released the reissue as a double LP edition for 2020 Record Store Day, pressed on 180-gram recycled vinyl and packaged in 100% recycled board.

=== Live performances ===
Goulding supported American band Passion Pit in March 2010 and John Mayer during his UK tour in May and June. During the summer, she performed at a number of festivals; she performed at the Dot to Dot Festival in Bristol on 29 May and in Nottingham the following day. On 25 June, she performed a set at the Glastonbury Festival on the John Peel Stage. In July, Goulding made several live performances; she performed on the iTunes Festival at the Roundhouse in London on 8 July, later released digitally as an EP on 15 July. She made her T in the Park debut on 11 July and on the Nissan Juke Arena at the V Festival in late August. In September, she was part of the line-up for Bestival on the Isle of Wight. In support of the album in Europe, Goulding performed on the first day of Pukkelpop in Belgium, at the Open'er Festival in Poland and at Benicàssim in Spain.

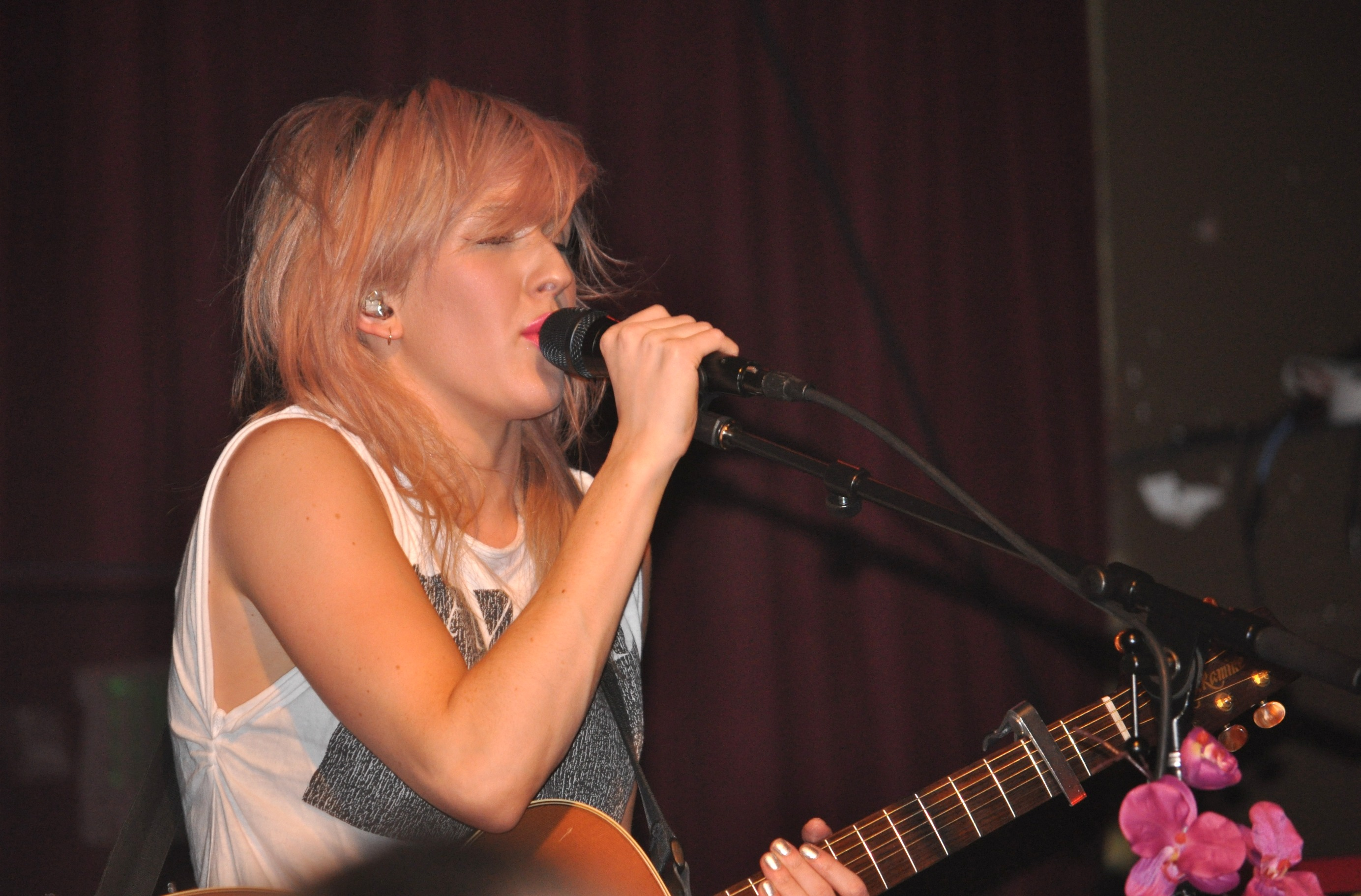
Goulding performing in Seattle on 11 April 2011

Goulding played live at Coachella Valley Music and Arts Festival in April 2011. She made her American television debut on Jimmy Kimmel Live! on 7 April, where she performed "Starry Eyed". On 29 April, Goulding sang "about 14 songs" at the reception party of Prince William and Catherine Middleton's wedding at Buckingham Palace, including her rendition of "Your Song" for the couple's first dance. She performed both "Lights" and "Your Song" on Saturday Night Live on 7 May and on The Early Show on 30 July. Goulding performed, for the second consecutive year, at Radio 1's Big Weekend on 14 May. The singer headlined the Wakestock festival in Wales, performing on 8 July. In August, she performed at V Festival again for her second year in a row. On 6 August, Goulding performed at Lollapalooza in Chicago. On 1 December, the singer performed at the White House during the National Christmas Tree lighting ceremony, alongside Big Time Rush and will.i.am. Goulding performed at the annual Nobel Peace Prize Concert on 11 December in Oslo, Norway.

Goulding was a musical guest on Late Show with David Letterman on 18 January 2012, performing "Lights". She also performed the track on The Ellen DeGeneres Show on April.

=== Singles and tour ===
"Under the Sheets" was released as the album's lead single on 9 November 2009, reaching number 53 on the UK Singles Chart. Follow-up single, "Starry Eyed", was released on 21 February 2010, peaking at number four. "Guns and Horses" was released digitally on 1 January as the promotional single, later released on 17 May physically as the third single from the album. It charted at number 26 in the UK. The album's fourth single, "The Writer", was released on 6 August, reaching number 19 on the UK Singles Chart.

In March and April 2011, Goulding embarked on the Lights Tour across North America to support the release of Lights in the United States. In June, she announced the second headline of the tour, set to begin on 23 July at Atlanta, GA with Nylon magazine.

== Critical reception ==
Professional ratings
Aggregate scores
Source	Rating
Metacritic	65/100
Review scores
Source	Rating
AllMusic	3.5/5 stars
The Daily Telegraph	4/5 stars
Drowned in Sound	6/10
The Fly	4/5 stars
The Guardian	2/5 stars
The Independent	3/5 stars
NME	6/10
Pitchfork	6.8/10
Rolling Stone	3/5 stars
Spin	7/10

According to the review aggregator Metacritic, Lights received "generally favorable reviews" based on a weighted average score of 65 out of 100 from 19 critic scores.

Contemporary reviews frequently focused on the balance between Goulding's folk-inflected vocals and the album's production. Writing for AllMusic, Matthew Chisling described Lights as a debut of "relevance", suggesting that Goulding effectively bridged organic and electronic impulses. He suggested that, while the album does not reach the theatrical intensity of Florence + the Machine's debut album Lungs (2009), it proves more controlled and engaging than the early releases by Pixie Lott and Little Boots. Camilla Pia of The Fly similarly characterised the record as "sparkling pop" with a "folky heart" and "electronic edge", while Caryn Ganz in Spin noted Goulding's confident handling of both disco-leaning tracks and rhythm-driven songs. In Rolling Stone, Jody Rosen similarly emphasised Goulding's "tremulous" soprano—rooted in British folk traditions—and considered the record evidence that a folk-oriented vocalist could successfully inhabit mainstream pop.

Several critics observed Goulding's voice alongside the contribution of producer Starsmith in shaping the album's sound. Neil McCormick of The Daily Telegraph praised Goulding's "extraordinary" high vibrato and the multi-tracked arrangements that generated an overwhelming emotional intensity, adding that a more understated and intimate approach could have improved its impact. Michael Cragg of MusicOMH likewise highlighted the strength of the songwriting and the "heady mix" of expansive choruses and "twinkling beats" fashioned with Starsmith. Joe Copplestone of PopMatters commended Starsmith's production flourishes while arguing that they could not entirely conceal the album's weaker moments. Reviewing the US edition for Consequence, Joe Marvilli was more critical of the production, arguing that the heavy reliance on synthesisers at times obscured Goulding's voice and instrumentation; he singled out "The Writer" and the Fraser T. Smith-produced "Your Biggest Mistake" as instances where the arrangements "compliments the core instruments rather than smothering them".

Some critics compared the album to other artists and questioned its originality. Alexis Petridis of The Guardian observed that, despite occasional vocal inflections reminiscent of Björk, Lights lacked the experimental restlessness of her early work, characterising the album as accessible but far from "cutting edge". Writing for Pitchfork, Stephen Troussé described the debut as "sometimes great, always promising", praising the euphoric energy of "Starry Eyed" and "Under the Sheets" while criticising "The Writer" for what he perceived as an overblown chorus evocative of Dolores O'Riordan of the Cranberries. In NME, Emily Mackay expressed reservations that the album's polished pop production risked positioning Goulding as a calculated successor to La Roux, though she acknowledged its potential as a "catchy pop" record. Writing in The Independent, Andy Gill similarly argued that despite occasional acoustic flourishes, the album aligned more closely with the retro-synth-pop of Little Boots and La Roux. He contended that production partner Fin Dow-Smith had effectively submerged Goulding's folk roots beneath dense synth programming and beats, lending an ironic edge to "her reproachful plaint to an unresponsive lover" expressed in "The Writer".

Other reviewers criticized the album's production and felt that it lacked emotional depth. David Renshaw of Drowned in Sound suggested that the record resembled "a naïve folk album given a blog house remix", arguing that it could feel hollow and lacking in sincerity. Copplestone likewise considered the album promising yet ultimately unsatisfying as a cohesive work, citing the presence of filler. Celina Murphy of Hot Press considered its slick arrangements and "whirring" production to lack edge, even as she credited Goulding's agile vocal performance with sustaining interest. By contrast, Mike Diver of BBC Music viewed Lights as exceeding expectations, suggesting it could elevate Goulding towards mainstream prominence, and arguing that her lyricism connected with listeners more directly than that of Florence Welch.

== Commercial performance ==
Lights debuted at number one on the UK Albums Chart, selling 36,854 copies in its first week. The following week, the album dropped to number 16 with 19,398 copies sold—the third biggest fall from number one ever in the UK, after Christina Aguilera's Bionic (2010) and George Harrison's All Things Must Pass (1971), which fell to numbers 29 and 18 respectively. Following the release of Bright Lights in late November 2010, the album re-entered the top 100 at number 24, selling 23,629 copies. It was the 24th best-selling album of 2010 in the UK, having sold nearly 300,000 copies by late November 2010. In early January 2011, the album returned to the top 10, where it continued for six weeks. Following Goulding's performance at the reception party of Prince William and Catherine Middleton's wedding on 29 April 2011, the album returned once again to the top 10 on 8 May, jumping from number 23 to number 10 on sales of 11,981 units. Lights was certified double platinum by the British Phonographic Industry (BPI) on 22 July 2013. By April 2020, the album had sold over 840,000 copies in the UK.

Lights debuted on the Irish Albums Chart at number 12 on 4 March 2010. Following the Bright Lights reissue, the album entered the Irish top 10 for the first time, attaining a new peak position of number six on 24 February 2011. Elsewhere, the album reached number eight on the European Top 100 Albums chart, number 28 in New Zealand, number 35 in Norway, number 42 in Germany, number 54 in Belgium and number 90 in Switzerland.

On the issue dated 26 March 2011, Lights debuted at number 129 on the Billboard 200 and at number one on the Heatseekers Albums chart in the United States, selling 4,000 copies in its first week. Following a string of US performances, including Saturday Night Live, the album re-entered the Billboard 200 at number 82 on 21 May 2011, climbing to number 76 the following week. On 21 July 2012, the album rose from number 116 to its peak position of number 21 with sales of 23,000 copies—an increase of 444% from the previous week. As of June 2012, the album had sold 300,000 units in the US. Lights debuted at number 76 on the Canadian Albums Chart on 12 May 2011, peaking at number 66 the following week. The album had sold 1.6 million copies worldwide as of October 2012.

== Track listing ==
All tracks were produced by Starsmith, except for the videos and where noted.

Standard edition
No.	Title	Writer(s)	Producer(s)	Length
1.	"Guns and Horses"	Ellie Goulding; John Fortis		3:35
2.	"Starry Eyed"	Goulding; Jonny Lattimer		2:56
3.	"This Love (Will Be Your Downfall)"	Goulding; Starsmith		3:53
4.	"Under the Sheets"	Goulding; Starsmith		3:44
5.	"The Writer"	Goulding; Lattimer		4:11
6.	"Every Time You Go"	Goulding; Fortis; Starsmith		3:25
7.	"Wish I Stayed"	Goulding	Frankmusik	3:40
8.	"Your Biggest Mistake"	Goulding; Fraser T. Smith	Smith	3:25
9.	"I'll Hold My Breath"	Goulding; Starsmith		3:45
10.	"Salt Skin"	Goulding; Starsmith		4:17
Total length:				36:21

European iTunes Store edition
No.	Title	Writer(s)	Producer(s)	Length
11.	"Lights"	Goulding; Richard Stannard; Ash Howes	Stannard; Howes	4:05
12.	"Under the Sheets" (video)			3:52
13.	"Starry Eyed" (video)			3:04
14.	"Starry Eyed" (AN21 and Max Vangeli remix) (pre-order only)	Goulding; Lattimer		8:17
15.	"Under the Sheets" (Baby Monster remix) (pre-order only)	Goulding; Starsmith		4:41

German iTunes Store edition (bonus content)
No.	Title	Writer(s)	Producer(s)	Length
11.	"Lights"	Goulding; Stannard; Howes	Stannard; Howes	4:05
12.	"Wish I Stayed" (acoustic) (video)			4:00
13.	"Roscoe" (acoustic) (video)			3:27

Vinyl edition
No.	Title	Writer(s)	Producer(s)	Length
11.	"Lights" (single version)	Goulding; Stannard; Howes	Stannard; Howes	3:32

US edition and Canadian reissue
No.	Title	Writer(s)	Producer(s)	Length
1.	"Lights" (single version)	Goulding; Stannard; Howes	Stannard; Howes	3:32
2.	"Guns and Horses"	Goulding; Fortis		3:35
3.	"Starry Eyed"	Goulding; Lattimer		2:56
4.	"This Love (Will Be Your Downfall)"	Goulding; Starsmith		3:53
5.	"Under the Sheets"	Goulding; Starsmith		3:44
6.	"The Writer"	Goulding; Lattimer		4:11
7.	"Animal"	Goulding; Starsmith		3:40
8.	"Every Time You Go"	Goulding; Fortis; Starsmith		3:25
9.	"Your Biggest Mistake"	Goulding; Smith	Smith	3:25
10.	"Salt Skin"	Goulding; Starsmith		4:17
11.	"Your Song"	John; Taupin	Lovett	3:10

North American Amazon MP3
No.	Title	Writer(s)	Length
12.	"Human"	Goulding; Starsmith	4:09

North American iTunes Store edition
No.	Title	Writer(s)	Producer	Length
12.	"Starry Eyed" (live at the Cherrytree House)	Goulding; Lattimer	Martin Kierszenbaum	3:02

US digital edition
No.	Title	Writer(s)	Producer(s)	Length
12.	"Lights" (Bassnectar remix)	Goulding; Stannard; Howes	Stannard; Howes; Bassnectar^{[b]}	4:37

=== Lights 10 ===
Disc one
No.	Title	Writer(s)	Producer(s)	Length
1.	"Guns and Horses"	Goulding; John Fortis		3:35
2.	"Starry Eyed"	Goulding; Lattimer		2:56
3.	"This Love (Will Be Your Downfall)"	Goulding; Starsmith		3:53
4.	"Under the Sheets"	Goulding; Starsmith		3:44
5.	"The Writer"	Goulding; Lattimer		4:11
6.	"Every Time You Go"	Goulding; Fortis; Starsmith		3:25
7.	"Wish I Stayed"	Goulding	Frankmusik	3:40
8.	"Your Biggest Mistake"	Goulding; Smith	Smith	3:25
9.	"I'll Hold My Breath"	Goulding; Starsmith		3:45
10.	"Salt Skin"	Goulding; Starsmith		4:17
Total length:				34:51

Disc two (Bright Lights)
No.	Title	Writer(s)	Producer(s)	Length
1.	"Lights" (single version)	Goulding; Stannard; Howes	Stannard; Howes	3:32
2.	"Human"	Goulding; Starsmith		4:09
3.	"Little Dreams"	Goulding; Howe	Howe	3:18
4.	"Home"	Goulding; Falke	Falke	3:24
5.	"Animal"	Goulding; Starsmith		3:40
6.	"Believe Me"	Goulding; Crispin Hunt; Rob Blake	Blake^{[a]}; Hunt^{[a]}; Falke	4:03
7.	"Your Song"	John; Taupin	Ben Lovett	3:10
Total length:				25:18

Disc three (Run into the Light)
No.	Title	Writer(s)	Producer(s)	Length
1.	"This Love (Will Be Your Downfall)" (Mille remix)	Goulding; Starsmith	Starsmith; Mille^{[b]}	5:47
2.	"Guns and Horses" (Monsieur Adi remix)	Goulding; Fortis	Starsmith; Monsieur Adi^{[b]}	4:34
3.	"Lights" (Fear of Tigers)	Goulding; Stannard; Howes	Stannard; Howes; Fear of Tigers^{[b]}	5:00
4.	"Salt Skin" (Alex Metric remix)	Goulding; Starsmith	Starsmith; Metric^{[b]}	5:09
5.	"Starry Eyed" (Russ Chimes)	Goulding; Lattimer	Starsmith; Chimes^{[b]}	4:57
6.	"Under the Sheets" (Jakwob remix)	Goulding; Starsmith	Starsmith; Jakwob^{[b]}	5:48
Total length:				31:16

=== Notes ===
- ^{^[a]} signifies an original producer.
- ^{^[b]} signifies a remixer.

== Personnel ==
Credits were adapted from the liner notes.

=== Musicians ===
- Ellie Goulding – vocals (all tracks); acoustic guitar (tracks 1, 3–10); piano (track 8)
- Starsmith – keyboards, drum programming (tracks 1–6, 9, 10); bass (tracks 1–5, 9, 10); saxophone (track 9)
- Seye Adelekan – backing vocals, acoustic guitar (track 2); electric guitar (tracks 3, 6)
- Charlie Morton – backing vocals, additional acoustic guitar (track 4)
- Joe Clegg – drums (tracks 5, 6)
- Stevie Blacke – live strings (track 5)
- Frankmusik – keyboards, backing vocals, programming (track 7)
- Fraser T. Smith – keyboards (track 8)

=== Technical ===
- Starsmith – production (tracks 1–6, 9, 10)
- Mark "Spike" Stent – mixing (tracks 2–6, 8–10)
- Julian Kindred – drum engineering (track 5)
- Matt Hill – drum engineering (track 6)
- Frankmusik – production, recording (track 7)
- Fraser T. Smith – production (track 8)
- Beatriz Artola – engineering (track 8)
- Naweed – mastering

=== Artwork ===
- Alan Clarke – photography
- Traffic – design

== Charts ==
=== Weekly charts ===
List of weekly chart positions
Chart (2010–2012)	Peak position
Australian Hitseekers Albums (ARIA)	4
Belgian Albums (Ultratop Flanders)	54
Canadian Albums (Nielsen SoundScan)	66
European Albums (Billboard)	8
German Albums (Offizielle Top 100)	42
Greek International Albums (IFPI)	38
Irish Albums (IRMA)	6
New Zealand Albums (RMNZ)	28
Norwegian Albums (VG-lista)	35
Scottish Albums (Official Charts)	6
Swiss Albums (Schweizer Hitparade)	90
UK Albums (Official Charts)	1
US Billboard 200	21

=== Year-end charts ===
List of year-end chart positions
Chart (2010)	Position
UK Albums (OCC)	24
Chart (2011)	Position
UK Albums (OCC)	39

=== Decade-end charts ===
List of decade-end chart positions
Chart (2010–2019)	Position
UK Albums (OCC)	71

== Certifications ==
List of certifications and sales
Region	Certification	Certified units/sales
Canada (Music Canada)	Platinum	80,000^{‡}
New Zealand (RMNZ)	Gold	15,000^{‡}
United Kingdom (BPI)	2× Platinum	865,000
United States (RIAA)	Platinum	1,000,000^{‡}
^{‡} Sales+streaming figures based on certification alone.

== Release history ==
List of release dates and formats
Region	Date	Format(s)	Version(s)	Label	Ref.
Ireland	26 February 2010	CD; digital download; streaming	Standard; deluxe	Polydor	
Netherlands	26 February 2010	CD; digital download; streaming	Standard; deluxe	Universal	
Sweden	1 March 2010	CD; digital download; streaming	Standard; deluxe	Universal	
United Kingdom	1 March 2010	CD; digital download; streaming	Standard; deluxe	Polydor	
Canada	2 March 2010	CD; digital download; streaming	Standard; deluxe	Universal	
Poland	26 March 2010	CD; digital download; streaming	Standard; deluxe	Universal	
Italy	9 April 2010	CD; digital download; streaming	Standard; deluxe	Universal	
Australia	16 April 2010	CD; digital download; streaming	Standard; deluxe	Universal	
Germany	14 May 2010	CD; digital download; streaming	Standard; deluxe	Universal	
Canada	8 March 2011	CD; digital download; streaming	Reissue	Universal	
United States	8 March 2011	CD; digital download; streaming	US edition	Cherrytree; Interscope	
United Kingdom	15 June 2015	LP	Vinyl edition	Polydor	
Brazil	29 June 2018	CD	Standard	Universal	
Various	26 February 2020	Digital download; streaming	Lights 10	Universal	
Various	26 September 2020	LP	Lights 10	Polydor; Interscope	
