= Lights (Ellie Goulding song) =

2011 single by Ellie Goulding

Single by Ellie Goulding

from the album Bright Lights
- B-side: "Only Girl in the World"
- Released: 13 March 2011
- Genre: Synth-pop; pop; EDM
- Length: 4:05; 3:32 (single version)
- Label: Polydor
- Songwriters: Ellie Goulding; Richard Stannard; Ash Howes
- Producers: Richard "Biff" Stannard; Ash Howes

Ellie Goulding singles chronology
"Wonderman" (2011)	"Lights" (2011)	"Anything Could Happen" (2012)

Music video
- "Lights" on YouTube

"Lights" is a song by English singer and songwriter Ellie Goulding from Bright Lights (2010), the reissue of her debut studio album, Lights (2010). Written by Goulding, Richard Stannard and Ash Howes, the song was inspired by Goulding's childhood fear of the dark. It was released on 13 March 2011 as the album's sixth single overall, and second from Bright Lights. Originally a bonus track on the UK and German iTunes edition of Lights, the song was re-edited for inclusion on Bright Lights in late 2010, serving as the single version. The song was later included on the track list of her second studio album, Halcyon (2012) and its reissue Halcyon Days (2013).

"Lights" received positive reviews from music critics, who praised the song's production and Goulding's "ethereal" vocals. The song was also a commercial success, reaching the top 20 in several countries. In the United States, "Lights" was a sleeper hit, reaching number two on the Billboard Hot 100 after 33 weeks on the chart. It was the fifth best-selling song of 2012 in the US. The song has been certified seven-times platinum by the Recording Industry Association of America (RIAA). In 2022, "Lights" became viral on the video-sharing apps TikTok and Instagram. In response to its resurgence, Goulding and Speed Radio released a sped-up remix on 1 July 2022.

== Background and release ==
"Lights" was originally announced as a single on 8 September 2010 on Goulding's Twitter page, with a release date scheduled for 1 November 2010. It was set to be released as the lead single from the album's repackaging as Bright Lights. However, this plan was scrapped in favour of releasing "Your Song" to capitalise on the John Lewis Christmas advert that it was featured in. This was followed by the reissue of the album Lights as Bright Lights.

In January 2011, it was once again announced that the single version of "Lights" would be released. A digital EP was released in the United Kingdom on 13 March 2011, containing Goulding's acoustic cover version of Rihanna's "Only Girl (In the World)" as performed on BBC Radio 1's Live Lounge on 10 December 2010.

The single version of "Lights" also appears as a bonus track on the international edition of Goulding's second studio album, Halcyon.

== Composition ==
A synth-pop, pop, and EDM song, "Lights" is written in the key of G♯ minor with a moderate pop tempo of 120 beats per minute. Goulding's vocals span from F♯_{3} to D♯_{5} while the song follows a chord progression of G♯m−F♯−E−C♯m7. Lyrically, the song discusses the fear of the dark that Goulding had as a child, and how she could only sleep with the lights on. In an interview with 97.1 AMP Radio in late July 2012, Goulding stated, "Sometimes if I've had a couple of drinks and I come back and just like lie on my bed and fall asleep I wake up and realize that there isn't a light on and I have to turn a light on." She also explained: "It can be seen as something like a lighthouse that kind of always guides you home. I've always felt comfort sleeping with the light on, and I've always felt comfort being with my siblings."

== Critical reception ==
"Lights" received generally positive reviews from most music critics. Horatia Harrod of The Daily Telegraph commented that the song is "threaded with dark thoughts, but set to an airy pop production bordering on polite. Her voice is the real star. She has the magical ability, not unlike her heroine, Björk, to sing with a sort of controlled tremulousness: her voice aches with vulnerability but never breaks." The Guardian reviewer Johnny Dee described the song as "a welcome return to her patented folky-pop-with-some-tasteful-drum-and-bass-wobble sound".

Genevieve Koski of The A.V. Club was also positive of the song, giving it an A− and praising the song's "organic-sounding" production and Goulding's "ethereal, restrained" vocals, while Steven Hyden of The A.V. Club gave it a C, claiming that Goulding sounds too "restrained" and "aloof to the point of emotional constipation". About.com's Bill Lamb rated the song three-and-a-half out of five stars, calling it "a pleasing, catchy slice of electro-pop" and noting that "Goulding's voice has an edge of sadness and vulnerability that sets the song apart from standard dance pop", but concluded, "In a pop music world dominated by distinctive vocalists, it is too easy for a song like 'Lights' to feel polite and get lost in the shuffle."

On 8 October 2014, "Lights" was honoured as Song of the Year at American Society of Composers, Authors and Publishers' (ASCAP) 34th annual awards in London.

== Commercial performance ==
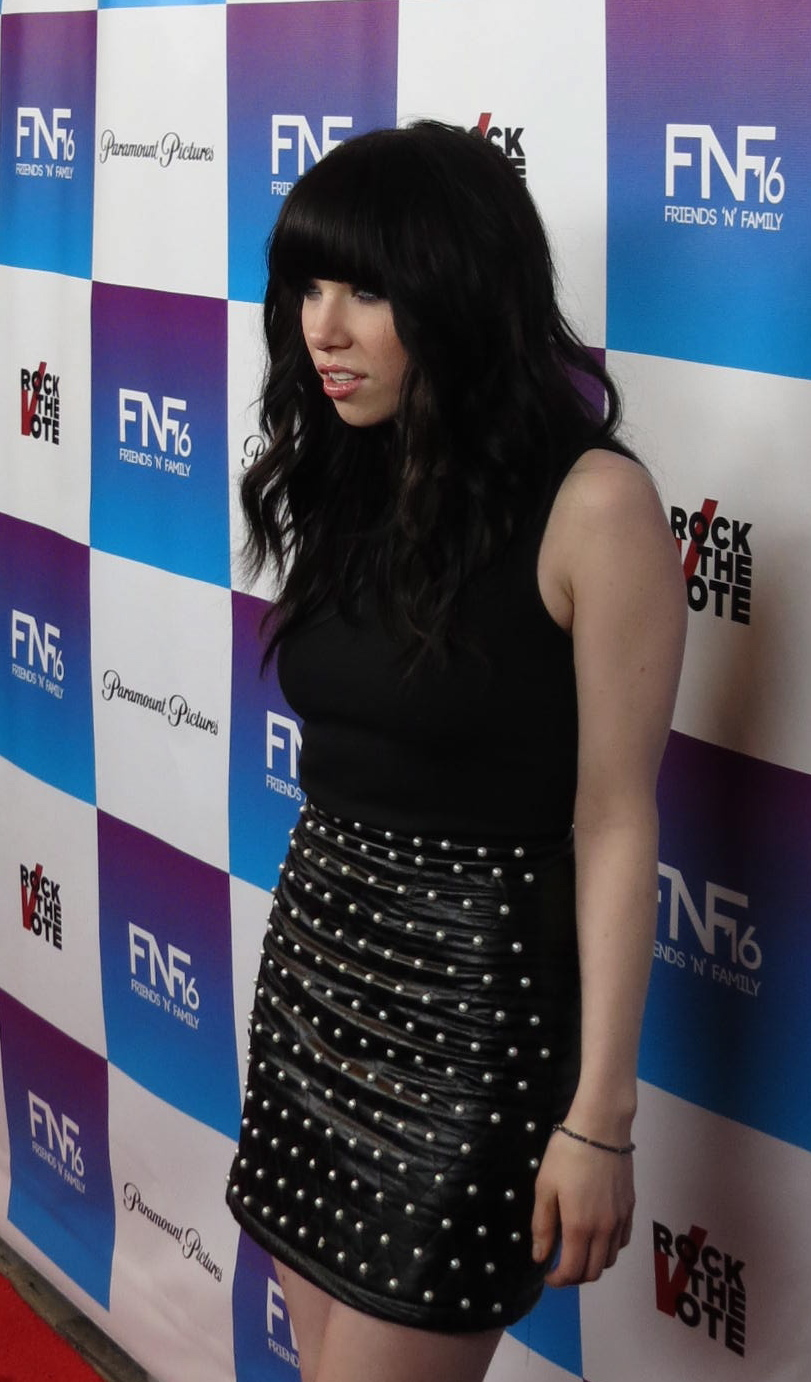
"Lights" was barred from the number one position on the US Billboard Hot 100 by Carly Rae Jepsen's (pictured) "Call Me Maybe".

"Lights" debuted at number 111 on the UK Singles Chart for the week ending 18 December 2010, based on digital sales from Bright Lights. Three months later, during the week ending 12 March 2011, the single entered the top 100 for the first time at number 91. The following week, it rose to number 64, eventually peaking at number 49 in its sixth week on the chart.

On the issue dated 20 August 2011, "Lights" debuted at number 85 on the US Billboard Hot 100 and at number 89 on the Canadian Hot 100, becoming Goulding's first single to chart in North America. The song re-entered the Billboard Hot 100 at number 99 during the week of 14 January 2012. When "Lights" reached number 40 in its 19th week, on the issue dated 12 May, the song attained the third-slowest climb to the top 40 by a female artist, after Norah Jones's "Don't Know Why" and KT Tunstall's "Suddenly I See". In its 29th week, the song made Hot 100 history by achieving the longest climb to the chart's top five not aided by country-to-pop crossover success or multiple releases. The single reached number two in its 33rd chart week, on the issue dated 18 August 2012, and held that position for two consecutive weeks, behind "Call Me Maybe" by Carly Rae Jepsen and "Whistle" by Flo Rida, respectively, making it Goulding's highest-peaking single on the chart to date.

"Lights" ascended to number one on the Radio Songs chart on the issue dated 25 August 2012, making Goulding the first female solo artist to send a debut Radio Songs entry to number one since Adele led the list in 2011 with her single "Rolling in the Deep". The song also topped the Mainstream Top 40 during the same week, matching Pink's "U + Ur Hand" (23 weeks, 2006–2007) for the longest climb to number one by a woman in the chart's almost-20-year history. The single also made a re-entry on the Canadian Hot 100 at number 87 on 28 April 2012, eventually peaking at number seven on 22 September. In late December 2012, "Lights" spent its 52nd week on the Hot 100 at number 43, becoming the 30th song in the chart's history to spend a year on the tally. In June 2013, it became the fifth best-selling digital song by a British female solo artist in the US. "Lights" was certified seven-times Platinum by the Recording Industry Association of America (RIAA) on 29 March July 2023.

"Lights" saw moderate success in mainland Europe, charting at number one in Poland, number eight in Austria, number 10 in Belgium and Slovakia, number 11 in Germany, number 14 in Switzerland, number 22 in the Czech Republic and number 29 in France. In New Zealand, the song debuted at number 25 on the RIANZ Singles Chart on 25 June 2012, reaching number 16 in its fifth and ninth weeks on the chart.

== Music video ==
The music video for "Lights" was filmed by Sophie Muller on 21 September 2010 before the lead single from the Bright Lights re-release was changed to "Your Song". It was officially released on 20 January 2011. The video shows Goulding dancing, playing the drums and the tambourine whilst different lighting effects including lasers surround her as she sings. It also shows her in numerous scenes swinging different hand-held lights and torches around giving the impression of a light painting, whilst the camera produces a bullet time effect like those used in The Matrix. The lighting rig in the video was created by a small group of students from Middlesex University.

== Live performances ==
Goulding performed the song live on Alan Carr: Chatty Man on 21 February 2011. She performed a Saturday Session on Dermot O'Leary's BBC Radio 2 afternoon show on 26 February 2011, where she sang "Lights". She also performed "Lights" on BBC Radio 1's Live Lounge on 12 March 2011, along with a cover of José González's version of The Knife's "Heartbeats". On 22 September 2013, Goulding performed the track as part of her setlist at the iTunes Festival at the Roundhouse in London.

As part of promotion in the United States, Goulding performed the song on Saturday Night Live on 7 May 2011, along with "Your Song". She also performed both "Lights" and "Your Song" on The Early Show on 30 July 2011. On 18 January 2012, she performed the single on Late Show with David Letterman. On 11 April 2012, she performed it on The Ellen DeGeneres Show.

== Legacy ==
=== In popular culture ===
==== Cover versions and sampling ====
American rapper Lupe Fiasco sampled the Bassnectar remix of "Lights" for his song "Lightwork", from his 2011 mixtape Friend of the People: I Fight Evil. American new wave band Blondie performed the song as an intro to "Atomic" in 2012 and 2013 while on tour. At the Drive-In and the Mars Volta guitarist Omar Rodríguez-López covered the song on his 2016 solo album Blind Worms Pious Swine. American hard rock band Through Fire recorded a cover of "Lights" on their debut studio album, Breathe (2016). In 2022, American rapper Fivio Foreign sampled "Lights" for the song "World Watching" from his debut album B.I.B.L.E.

==== Use in media ====
The song is included on the soundtrack to the 2012 film Spring Breakers and is played during the closing credits. That same year, it was featured on the episode "The Bonus Check" from the first season of ABC Family dramedy series Jane By Design. In 2013, American indie-pop duo Wanderhouse recorded a cover version of "Lights" that was featured in The CW science fiction series Beauty & the Beast. American actress Elle Fanning performed the song in the 2018 film Teen Spirit, and subsequently recorded a studio version for the film's official soundtrack, released in 2019. The song was also featured on the 2018 British comedy film The Festival. In 2024, an orchestral version of "Lights" by American musician Archer Marsh was featured in the third season of the Netflix period drama series Bridgerton.

=== Resurgence ===
In 2022, "Lights" became a popular TikTok trend; the remixed version of the song was used in car washing videos. In response to its resurgence, Goulding and Speed Radio released a "Sped Up" remix on 1 July 2022.

=== Recognitions ===
Over the years, "Lights" has appeared on numerous publications' lists. In 2017, Billboard placed the track as fourth on their Goulding's 10 best songs list, with music critic Kat Bein praising the track as "a damn good electro-pop song," commending Goulding's vocal performance for its "unique in its fierce coyness" quality and its "awesome feminine energy" that was "impossible to forget." Billboard also placed it as the 242nd-greatest all time song of the summer, while Vice ranked it as the 68th-best EDM song of all time, with critic Colin Joyce stating that the track remains Goulding's "greatest flirtation with the dancefloor". On decade-end lists covering the 2010s, Consequence ranked the single as the 86th-best song of the decade, describing it as "an ethereal dream full of color" and "a classic pop record to be enjoyed well beyond the first listen". Meanwhile, the Bassnectar remix was named the 93rd-greatest EDM anthem by Spin and the 72nd-best song of the decade by Dancing Astronaut.

==== Listicles ====
Appearances on listicles by publication
Publication	Year	List	Rank	Notes	Ref.
Billboard	2017	The 10 Best Ellie Goulding Songs (Critic's Pick)	4th	—	
Billboard	2021	The Greatest of All Time Songs of the Summer	242nd	—	
Consequence	2019	The Top 100 Best Songs of the 2010s	86th	—	
Dancing Astronaut	2020	The Top 100 Songs of the Decade	72nd	Bassnectar Remix	
EDM.com	2018	The 15 EDM Songs That Hit You Right In The Feels	3rd	Bassnectar Remix	
EDM.com	2019	The 11 Dubstep Songs You Forgot How Much You Loved	Listed	Bassnectar Remix	
Singersroom	2023	The Top 20 Songs About Lights	8th	—	
Singersroom	2024	The 15 Best Electronic Music Songs of All Time	2nd	Bassnectar Remix	
Spin	2015	The 100 Greatest EDM Anthems of the ’10s	93rd	Bassnectar Remix	
Vice	2017	The 101 Best EDM Songs of All Time	68th	—	

== Track listings ==
UK digital EP
No.	Title	Length
1.	"Lights" (single version)	3:30
2.	"Only Girl in the World" (Live Lounge acoustic version)	4:07
3.	"Lights" (Bassnectar remix)	4:36
4.	"Lights" (Shook remix)	3:49
5.	"Lights" (MK Charlee Dub)	5:04
6.	"Lights" (Max Gordon remix)	4:49

US and Canadian digital EP – The Remixes Pt. 1
No.	Title	Length
1.	"Lights" (Bassnectar remix)	4:36
2.	"Lights" (MK Charlee Dub)	5:05
3.	"Lights" (Max Gordon remix)	4:49
4.	"Lights" (Shook remix)	3:49

US and Canadian digital EP – The Remixes Pt. 2
No.	Title	Length
1.	"Lights" (Drop Lamond remix)	4:17
2.	"Lights" (Fernando Garibay remix)	4:03
3.	"Lights" (Captain Cuts remix)	4:11
4.	"Lights" (Ming remix)	4:57
5.	"Lights" (RAC Mix)	5:44

Digital download – Sped Up Version
No.	Title	Artist	Length
1.	"Lights" (Sped Up version)	Ellie Goulding and Speed Radio	3:10
2.	"Lights" (single version)	Ellie Goulding	3:30

== Personnel ==
Credits were adapted from the liner notes of Bright Lights.

- Ellie Goulding – vocals, guitar, songwriting
- Ash Howes – drums, keyboards, mixing, production, songwriting
- Steven Malcolmson – programming
- Naweed – mastering
- Richard "Biff" Stannard – bass, keyboards, mixing, production, songwriting

== Charts ==
=== Weekly charts ===
Weekly chart performance for "Lights"
Chart (2011–2013)	Peak position
Austria (Ö3 Austria Top 40)	8
Belgium (Ultratop 50 Flanders)	10
Belgium (Ultratop 50 Wallonia)	7
Canada Hot 100 (Billboard)	7
Czech Republic Airplay (ČNS IFPI)	22
France (SNEP)	29
Germany (GfK)	11
Japan Hot 100 (Billboard)	65
Lebanon (Lebanese Top 20)	2
Netherlands (Dutch Top 40)	33
Netherlands (Single Top 100)	58
New Zealand (Recorded Music NZ)	16
Poland Airplay (ZPAV)	1
Scottish Singles Sales (Official Charts)	48
Slovakia Airplay (ČNS IFPI)	10
Slovenia (SloTop50)	2
Switzerland (Schweizer Hitparade)	14
UK Singles (Official Charts)	49
US Billboard Hot 100	2
US Adult Contemporary (Billboard)	17
US Adult Pop Airplay (Billboard)	4
US Alternative Airplay (Billboard)	28
US Dance Club Songs (Billboard)	32
US Dance Airplay (Billboard)	1
US Hot Rock & Alternative Songs (Billboard)	37
US Pop Airplay (Billboard)	1
US Rhythmic Airplay (Billboard)	10

=== Year-end charts ===
2012 year-end chart performance for "Lights"
Chart (2012)	Position
Belgium (Ultratop 50 Wallonia)	79
Canada (Canadian Hot 100)	41
France (SNEP)	135
Netherlands (Dutch Top 40)	186
US Billboard Hot 100	5
US Adult Contemporary (Billboard)	45
US Adult Top 40 (Billboard)	19
US Dance/Mix Show Airplay (Billboard)	10
US Mainstream Top 40 (Billboard)	1
US Rhythmic (Billboard)	48

2013 year-end chart performance for "Lights"
Chart (2013)	Position
Austria (Ö3 Austria Top 40)	55
Belgium (Ultratop 50 Flanders)	100
France (SNEP)	191
Germany (Official German Charts)	46
Switzerland (Schweizer Hitparade)	69

== Certifications ==
Certifications for "Lights"
Region	Certification	Certified units/sales
Belgium (BRMA)	Gold	15,000^{*}
Brazil (Pro-Música Brasil)	Platinum	60,000^{‡}
Denmark (IFPI Danmark)	Platinum	90,000^{‡}
Germany (BVMI)	Platinum	300,000^{‡}
New Zealand (RMNZ)	3× Platinum	90,000^{‡}
Norway (IFPI Norway)	Platinum	10,000^{*}
Switzerland (IFPI Switzerland)	Platinum	30,000^{^}
United Kingdom (BPI)	Platinum	600,000^{‡}
United States (RIAA)	7× Platinum	7,000,000^{‡}
^{*} Sales figures based on certification alone.^{^} Shipments figures based on certification alone.^{‡} Sales+streaming figures based on certification alone.

== Release history ==
Release dates and formats
Region	Date	Format	Label	Ref.
United Kingdom	13 March 2011	Digital EP	Polydor	
Canada	23 May 2011	Digital EP – The Remixes Pt. 1	Cherrytree; Interscope	
United States	23 May 2011	Digital EP – The Remixes Pt. 1	Cherrytree; Interscope	
Canada	19 July 2011	Digital EP – The Remixes Pt. 2	Cherrytree; Interscope	
United States	19 July 2011	Digital EP – The Remixes Pt. 2	Cherrytree; Interscope	
United States	24 January 2012	Contemporary hit radio	Cherrytree; Interscope	

== See also ==
- List of Hot 100 Airplay number-one singles of the 2010s
- List of Billboard Mainstream Top 40 number-one songs of 2012
- List of number-one dance airplay hits of 2012 (U.S.)
- List of number-one singles of 2012 (Poland)
