= Starsmith =

British music producer (born 1988)

- Born: Finlay Dow-Smith; 8 July 1988 (age 38); Bromley, England
- Genres: Pop; electronic; house; synth-pop
- Occupations: Record producer; songwriter; musician
- Instruments: Drums; synthesizer; saxophone; piano; guitar; bass; vocals
- Years active: 2009–present

Finlay Dow-Smith (born 8 July 1988), known professionally as Starsmith, is a British songwriter, record producer and DJ.

Smith's best known for co-writing and serving as the primary producer for Ellie Goulding's debut album Lights, which was met with critical and commercial success. Following its release in 2010, it went straight to No. 1 in the UK Albums Chart. The album has gone on to sell over 2,000,000 copies worldwide. He teamed up with Goulding again on her second studio album, Halcyon (2012), producing and co-writing three songs on the album, and eight years later, he collaborated on four tracks from her fourth studio album Brightest Blue (2020).

Smith has co-written and produced several hits during his music career, including: "Good Thing" by Zedd and Kehlani, "Crybaby" by Paloma Faith, and "I'll Be There" by Jess Glynne which went to number one in the UK and was nominated for Best Single at the 2019 Brit Awards. As well as producing "Hold My Hand" by Jess Glynne, and "Real Love" by Clean Bandit and Jess Glynne. Some of his notable work as a DJ includes his remixes for the singles "Bad Romance" by Lady Gaga, and "I Am Not A Robot" by Marina and the Diamonds.

For his contributions as record producer, Smith has been nominated for Producer of the Year at the 2018 A&R Awards, He also was recognized by the Music Producers Guild with nominations for Breakthrough Producer of the Year in 2011, and for his work as DJ he earned a nomination for Remixer of the Year in 2012.

== Career ==
He studied a classical music degree at the University of Surrey, majoring in performance on saxophone and graduating in 2009. He met Ellie Goulding during his final year and together they started creating what would become her debut album, which was then signed to Polydor Records a few months after he graduated.

Starsmith toured with Goulding in 2009 and 2010, and also played with her on Later... with Jools Holland in 2009, playing bass guitar. He is a noted instrumentalist, additionally playing piano and guitar, but his main instrument is the saxophone.

In December 2011, he was the subject of an episode of the Red Bull and Vice documentary series, The Producers. In March 2014, the track "Dead In The Water" that he co-wrote and produced with Ellie Goulding was included in the promotion and soundtrack for the film Divergent, which opened at No.1 at the Worldwide Box Office.

In 2015, he co-wrote and produced seven songs with Jess Glynne on her number one debut album I Cry When I Laugh, including the single "Hold My Hand", which spent four weeks at number 1 in the UK and sold over two million copies worldwide. In 2017, he collaborated with Paloma Faith on her number one album The Architect, co-writing and producing five songs. Their first writing session together resulted in the lead single "Crybaby". That year he also wrote songs with Jessie Ware for her album Glasshouse and with Rae Morris for her album, Someone Out There. He worked with Cloves and her longtime writing partner Justin Parker on singles from her debut album. "Bringing the House Down", their first collaboration, was released in early 2018 as the album's lead single. He co-wrote and produced the lead single "I'll Be There" for Jess Glynne's second album. The song went to number one in the UK, achieving their second chart-topper, and third top 3 single together.

In 2020, Smith reunited with Goulding, and worked on four songs for her fourth studio album Brightest Blue.

In August 2024, Smith released his first song as a lead artist since 2011, titled "Leave Me Slowly" which he co-wrote with longtime collaborator, Ellie Goulding and Sarah Troy. The song includes uncredited lead vocals from Goulding. It was released via Headroom and Another Rhythm Records.

== Discography ==
=== Extended plays ===
List of extended plays, with selected details
Title	Details	Track listing	Ref.
Lesson One	Released: 22 August 2011; Label: Vulture; Format: Digital download, streaming	1. Lesson One; 2. Champion; 3. Lesson One (extended edit); 4. Champion (radio edit)	

== Singles ==
=== As lead artist ===
List of singles released as lead artist
Title	Year	Album	Ref.
"Give Me a Break"/"Knucklebuster"	2010	Non-album single	
"Leave Me Slowly"	2024	TBA	

==== Promotional singles ====
List of promotional singles by Starsmith
Title	Year	Album	Ref.
"Lesson One"	2011	Lesson One	
"Champion"	2011	Lesson One	

=== Remixography ===
Year	Artist	Song title	Time
2009	Private	"My Secret Lover"	4:01
2009	Elviin	"In Colour"	4:44
2009	Bombay Bicycle Club	"Always Like This"	4:06
2009	Frankmusik	"3 Little Words" (Starsmith Remix)	3:29
2009	Marina and the Diamonds	"I Am Not a Robot" (Starsmith 24 Carat Remix)	5:18
2009	Little Boots	"New in Town" (Starsmith Remix)	5:30
2009	The Twang	"Barney Rubble" (Starsmith Remix)	5:24
2009	Girls Can't Catch	"Keep Your Head Up" (Starsmith Club Mix)	5:18
2009	The Mission District	"So Over You" (Starsmith Remix)	3:29
2009	Team WaterPolo	"Letting Go" (Starsmith Remix)	4:29
2009	Frankmusik	"Better Off as Two" (Starsmith Holiday in the Heath Remix)	4:29
2009	Passion Pit	"Sleepyhead" (Starsmith Remix feat. Ellie Goulding)	3:19
2009	Animal Kingdom	"Signs and Wonders" (Starsmith Remix)	4:17
2009	Paloma Faith	"New York" (Starsmith Remix)	3:36
2009	Lisa Mitchell	"Coin Laundry" (Starsmith Remix)	4:49
2009	Lady Gaga	"Bad Romance" (Starsmith Remix)	4:56
2010	Mika	"Blame It on the Girls" (Not on the Starsmith Remix)	6:17
2010	Timbaland featuring Katy Perry	"If We Ever Meet Again" (Starsmith Remix)	5:21
2010	N.E.R.D.	"Hot-n-Fun" (Starsmith Club Remix)	5:35
2010	Beyoncé	"Why Don't You Love Me" (Starsmith Remix – Radio Edit)	3:34
2010	Robyn	"Hang with Me" (Starsmith Remix)	6:04
2011	Gypsy & the Cat	"Jona Vark" (Starsmith Remix)	4:58
2011	Lady Gaga	"Born This Way" (Starsmith Remix)	6:45
2011	Marina and the Diamonds	"Radioactive" (Starsmith Rework)	4:37
2012	St. Lucia	"We Got It Wrong" (Starsmith Remix)	6:03
2013	Ed Drewett	"Drunk Dial" (Starsmith Remix)	5:37
2013	Matthew Koma	"Parachute" (Starsmith Remix)	5:18
2013	Hall & Oates	"I Can't Go For That" (Starsmith Rework)	4:48
2013	Betty Who	"Somebody Loves You" (Starsmith Remix)	6:24
2014	Joywave	"Tongues" (Starsmith Remix)	4:39

=== Songwriting and production credits ===
Title	Year	Artist(s)	Album	Credits	Written with	Produced with	Ref.
"Under the Sheets"	2009	Ellie Goulding	Under the Sheets EP / Lights	Co-writer/Producer	Elena Goulding	—N/a	
"Fighter Plane"	2009	Ellie Goulding	Under the Sheets EP	Co-writer/Producer	Elena Goulding	—N/a	
"Hollywood"	2010	Marina and the Diamonds	The Family Jewels	Producer	—N/a	Richard Stannard, Ash Howes	
"Hurtful"	2010	Erik Hassle	Pieces	Producer	—N/a	Grizzly, Tommy Tysper	
"Starry Eyed"	2010	Ellie Goulding	Lights	Producer	—N/a	—N/a	
"Guns and Horses"	2010	Ellie Goulding	Lights	Producer	—N/a	—N/a	
"The Writer"	2010	Ellie Goulding	Lights	Producer	—N/a	—N/a	
"Every Time You Go"	2010	Ellie Goulding	Lights	Co-writer/Producer	Elena Goulding, Jonathan Fortis	—N/a	
"I'll Hold My Breath"	2010	Ellie Goulding	Lights	Co-writer/Producer	Elena Goulding	—N/a	
"This Love (Will Be Your Downfall)"	2010	Ellie Goulding	Lights	Co-writer/Producer	Elena Goulding	—N/a	
"Salt Skin"	2010	Ellie Goulding	Lights	Co-writer/Producer	Elena Goulding	—N/a	
"You'll Never Get to Heaven"	2010	Diana Vickers	Song from the Tainted; Cherry Tree	Co-writer/Producer	Diana Vickers, Cass Lowe	—N/a	
"Put Your Hands Up (If You Feel Love)"	2010	Kylie Minogue	Aphrodite	Co-writer/Producer	Olivia Nervo, Miriam Nervo	Stuart Price	
"Yeah Yeah" (featuring Travie McCoy)	2010	Cheryl Cole	Messy Little Raindrops	Co-writer/Producer	Wayne Hector, Travis McCoy	—N/a	
"Human"	2010	Ellie Goulding	Bright Lights	Co-writer/Producer	Elena Goulding	—N/a	
"Animal"	2010	Ellie Goulding	Bright Lights	Co-writer/Producer	Elena Goulding	—N/a	
"Burn"	2011	Clare Maguire	Light After Dark	Co-writer/Producer	Clare Maguire	—N/a	
"High"	2011	Big Sean	Finally Famous	Co-writer	—N/a	—N/a	
"Lesson One"	2011	Starsmith	Lesson One	Writer/Producer	—N/a	—N/a	
"Champion"	2011	Starsmith	Lesson One	Writer/Producer	—N/a	—N/a	
"Dead in the Water"	2012	Ellie Goulding	Halcyon	Co-writer/Producer	Elena Goulding	—N/a	
"The Ending"	2012	Ellie Goulding	Halcyon	Co-writer/Producer	Elena Goulding	—N/a	
"Without Your Love"	2012	Ellie Goulding	Halcyon	Co-writer/Producer	Elena Goulding	—N/a	
"Us and Ours"	2013	Mark Owen	The Art of Doing Nothing	Co-writer/Producer	Mark Owen, Benjamin Mark, Jamie Norton	Charlie Russell, Bradley Spence	
"S.A.D." (featuring Ren Harvieu)	2013	Mark Owen	The Art of Doing Nothing	Co-writer/Producer	Mark Owen, Benjamin Mark, Jamie Norton	Charlie Russell, Bradley Spence	
"End of Everything"	2013	Mark Owen	The Art of Doing Nothing	Co-writer	Mark Owen, Benjamin Mark, Jamie Norton	—N/a	
"Ghost"	2013	Mark Owen	The Art of Doing Nothing	Co-writer	Mark Owen, Benjamin Mark, Jamie Norton	—N/a	
"Morning Belle"	2013	Mark Owen	The Art of Doing Nothing	Co-writer	Mark Owen, Benjamin Mark, Jamie Norton	—N/a	
"The Lamb"	2013	Mark Owen	The Art of Doing Nothing	Co-writer	Mark Owen, Benjamin Mark, Jamie Norton	—N/a	
"Somebody"	2013	Fenech-Soler	Rituals	Co-writer/Producer	Daniel Fenech-Soler, Andrew Lindsay, Ross Duffy, Benjamn Duffy	Fenech-Soler, Ross Duffy, Ben Duffy	
"Glow"	2013	Fenech-Soler	Rituals	Co-writer/Producer	—N/a	Fenech-Soler, Ross Duffy, Ben Duffy	
"Better"	2014	Betty Who	Take Me When You Go	Co-writer/Producer	Jessica Newham, Scott Hoffman	—N/a	
"Real Love" (with Jess Glynne)	2014	Clean Bandit	New Eyes / I Cry When I Laugh	Producer	—N/a	Clean Bandit, The Six	
"Hold My Hand"	2015	Jess Glynne	I Cry When I Laugh	Producer	—N/a	Jack Patterson	
"Fight for Love"	2015	Kwabs	Love + War	Producer	—N/a	Al Shux	
"Staring at the Sun"	2015	Mika	No Place in Heaven	Additional producer	—N/a	Martin Terefe	
"Preach"	2015	M.O	Non-album single	Co-writer/producer	Fransesca Connolly, Edward Thomas, Joel Compass, Fredrick Gibson, Annie Ashcroft	—N/a	
"Gave Me Something"	2015	Jess Glynne	I Cry When I Laugh	Co-writer/producer	Jessica Glynne, Andrew "Knox" Brown, Janee Bennett	Knox Brown	
"Ain't Got Far to Go"	2015	Jess Glynne	I Cry When I Laugh	Co-writer/producer	Jessica Glynne, Janee Bennett	Knox Brown	
"You Can Find Me"	2015	Jess Glynne	I Cry When I Laugh	Co-writer/producer	Jessica Glynne, Talay Riley	—N/a	
"It Ain't Right"	2015	Jess Glynne	I Cry When I Laugh	Co-writer/producer	Jessica Glynne, James Newman	—N/a	
"No Rights No Wrongs"	2015	Jess Glynne	I Cry When I Laugh	Co-writer/producer	Jessica Glynne, Andrew "Knox" Brown, Janee Bennett, Jonathan Coffer, James Newman	Knox Brown	
"Don't Follow Me"	2015	Ella Eyre	Feline	Co-writer/producer	Ella McMahon, Natalia Hajjara	Jay Reynolds	
"Is It Love" (featuring Yeah Boy)	2016	3lau	Non-album single	Co-writer/producer	Justin Blau, Jonathan Curtis	3lau	
"Power"	2016	Petite Meller	Lil Empire	Co-writer/producer	Syvan Miller	—N/a	
"Better by Your Side" featuring Tom Aspaul)	2016	Aeble	Better by Your Side	Co-writer/producer	Tom Aspaul	—N/a	
"California Numb"	2017	Cloves	One Big Nothing	Co-writer/producer	Kaity Dunstan, Justin Parker	Ian Barter	
"I Don't Know"	2017	Molly Kate Kestner	Non-album single	Co-writer/producer	Molly Kate Kestner, Amy Wadge	—N/a	
"Crybaby"	2017	Paloma Faith	The Architect	Co-writer/producer	Paloma Faith, Lindy Robbins, Cleo Tighe	—N/a	
"Good Times"	2017	Elderbrook	Talking	Co-writer/producer	Alexander Kotz	—N/a	
"First Time"	2017	Jessie Ware	Glasshouse	Co-writer/producer	Jessica Ware, James Newman	—N/a	
"Evolution" (featuring Samuel L. Jackson)	2017	Paloma Faith	The Architect	Producer	—N/a	Paloma Faith	
"I'll Be Gentle" (with John Legend)	2017	Paloma Faith	The Architect	Producer	—N/a	Jesse Shatkin	
"Politics of Hope" (featuring Owen Jones)	2017	Paloma Faith	The Architect	Producer	—N/a	Paloma Faith	
"Still Around"	2017	Paloma Faith	The Architect	Producer	—N/a	Klas Ahlund	
"Pawns" (featuring Baby N'Sola, Janelle Martin and Naomi Miller)	2017	Paloma Faith	The Architect	Co-writer/Producer	—N/a	Paloma Faith	
"My Body"	2017	Paloma Faith	The Architect	Co-writer/Producer	Paloma Faith, Andrew "Knox" Brown, Janee Bennett	Knox Brown	
"Bloodstains"	2018	Rhys Lewis	Bad Timing EP	Co-writer	Rhys Lewis, Ian Barter, O. Martin	—N/a	
"Family Man"	2018	Lily Allen	No Shame	Additional producer	—N/a	Mark Ronson	
"Dancing with Character"	2018	Rae Morris	Someone Out There	Co-writer/Producer	Rachel Morris, Benjamin Garrett	—N/a	
"Bringing the House Down"	2018	Cloves	One Big Nothing	Co-writer/Producer	Kaity Dunstan, Ariel Rechtshaid, Justin Parker	—N/a	
"Kiss Me in the Dark"	2018	Cloves	One Big Nothing	Co-writer/Producer	Kaity Dunstan, Justin Parker	—N/a	
"Hit Me Hard"	2018	Cloves	One Big Nothing	Co-writer/Producer	Kaity Dunstan, Justin Parker	—N/a	
"I'll Be There"	2018	Jess Glynne	Always in Between	Co-writer/Producer	Jessica Glynne, Camille Purcell, Henrik Michelsen, Edvard Erfjord, Jerker Hanssen	Electric	
"Won't Say No"	2018	Jess Glynne	Always in Between	Co-writer/Producer	Jessica Glynne, Janee Bennett, Clarence Coffee Jr.	—N/a	
"Rollin"	2018	Jess Glynne	Always in Between	Producer	—N/a	Fred Gibson	
"Million Reasons"	2018	Jess Glynne	Always in Between	Co-writer/Producer	Jessica Glynne, Sara Hjellstrom, Nirob Islam	—N/a	
"Final Breath"	2018	Paloma Faith	The Architect: Zeitgeist; Edition	Co-writer/Producer	Paloma Faith, Stephan Moccio, Clarence Coffee Jr.	—N/a	
"Older"	2018	Paloma Faith	The Architect: Zeitgeist; Edition	Co-writer/Producer	Paloma Faith, Cleo Tighe	—N/a	
"High Hopes"	2018	Rationale	High Hopes EP	Co-writer/Producer	Rationale	Rationale	
"73"	2018	Rationale	High Hopes EP	Co-writer	Rationale	—N/a	
"Hallelujah"	2019	Oh Wonder	Hallelujah	Additional producer	—N/a	Oh Wonder	
"Like I Love You"	2019	Shells	Like I Love You	Co-writer/Producer	Shells	—N/a	
"The Corner"	2019	Dermot Kennedy	Without Fear	Co-writer/Producer	Dermot Kennedy, Scott Harris	—N/a	
"Good Thing"	2019	Zedd and Kehlani	Non-album single	Co-writer/Producer	Cleo Tighe, Lostboy	Zedd	
"How It Goes"	2020	Oh Wonder	No One Else Can Wear Your Crown	Co-writer/Producer	Oh Wonder	Oh Wonder	
"Drunk On You"	2020	Oh Wonder	No One Else Can Wear Your Crown	Co-writer/Producer	Oh Wonder, Larzz Principato	Oh Wonder	
"Pieces"	2020	Navvy	The Final Pieces EP	Co-writer/Producer	Navvy, Rory Adams	—N/a	
"Get Away"	2020	Hayley Gene Penner	People You Follow	Co-writer/Producer	Hayley Gene Penner	—N/a	
"Lonely People"	2020	Hyyts	Non-album single	Co-writer/Producer	Hyyts, Rationale	—N/a	
"How Deep Is Too Deep"	2020	Ellie Goulding	Brightest Blue	Co-writer/Producer	Ellie Goulding, Joe Kearns	—N/a	
"Cyan"	2020	Ellie Goulding	Brightest Blue	Co-writer/Producer	Ellie Goulding, Joe Kearns, Jim Eliot	Joe Kearns, Jim Eliot	
"Tides"	2020	Ellie Goulding	Brightest Blue	Co-writer/Producer	Ellie Goulding, Joe Kearns	—N/a	
"Woman"	2020	Ellie Goulding	Brightest Blue	Producer	Joe Kearns, Eli Teplin	—N/a	
"SOS"	2020	Hyyts	SOS	Producer	—N/a	Rationale	
"Lose"	2020	Niki	Moonchild	Co-writer/Producer	Nicole Zefanya, Teddy Sinclair	Bēkon	
"Grow"	2020	Josie Man	Grow	Co-writer/Producer	Josie Man, Hannah Yadi, Josh Scarbrow	—N/a	
"99%"	2020	Gracey	The Art of Closure	Co-writer/Producer	Gracey, Al Shux	Al Shux	
"Monster"	2020	Paloma Faith	Infinite Things	Co-writer/Producer	Paloma Faith, MNEK	—N/a	
"Hypnosis"	2023	Ive	I've Ive	Co-writer	Seo Jeong-a, Gaeul, Rei	Risc, Elof Loelv	
"Baddie"	2023	Ive	I've Mine	Co-writer	Big Naughty, Perrie, Ryan S. Jhun	Ryan S. Jhun, Risc, Alawn	
"Leave Me Slowly"	2024	Starsmith	Leave Me Slowly (Remixes)	Co-writer/Producer	Ellie Goulding, Sarah Troy	—N/a	
"Angel of My Dreams (S.A.D. version – Slow. Angelic. Dramatic.)"	2024	JADE	Angel Of My Dreams - S.A.D. Version (Slow. Angelic. Dramatic.) - Single	Producer	—N/a	—N/a	
"Self Saboteur"	2025	JADE	That's Showbiz Baby!	Co-producer	—N/a	Goldfingers, MNEK	
"Silent Disco"	2025	JADE	That's Showbiz Baby!	Co-producer	—N/a	Jonah Christian, RAYE, Mike Sabath	

== Awards and nominations ==
List of awards and nominations received by Starsmith
Award	Year	Category	Nominee/Work	Result	Ref.
A&R Awards	2018	Producer of the Year	Himself	Nominated	
Music Producers Guild Awards	2012	Remixer of the Year	Himself	Nominated	
Music Producers Guild Awards	2011	Breakthrough Producer of the Year	Himself	Nominated	
