= The Writer (song) =

Single by Ellie Goulding

from the album Lights
- Released: 6 August 2010
- Length: 4:11
- Label: Polydor
- Songwriters: Ellie Goulding; Jonny Lattimer
- Producer: Starsmith

Ellie Goulding singles chronology
"Guns and Horses" (2010)	"The Writer" (2010)	"Your Song" (2010)

Music video
- "The Writer" on YouTube

"The Writer" is a song by English singer and songwriter Ellie Goulding from her debut album, Lights (2010). It was released as the album's fourth and final (not including the Bright Lights re-release) single on 6 August 2010.

== Background ==
Goulding told Sky Songs that "The Writer" is "the most personal and emotional song I've written yet", adding, "It's about how you'd do anything and change absolutely everything about yourself if necessary, just to be noticed by this one person."

== Critical reception ==
The Observer's Polly Vernon named "The Writer" the "love song of the summer" and called it "raw, eloquent, generally gorgeous", while describing Goulding's voice as "ghostly sweet, saved from sickliness by guttural Björk-ish quirks." OddOne of Unreality Shout felt that "[n]ot once has she sounded more warming than in this beautifully written love song of devotion to a lover", but noted that "being her first ballad, she does fall at some hurdles, like the middle 8: whilst Ellie's breathy vocals may appear to bridge the emotion between the two final choruses, it actually does feel a bit like she's gone back to her colder self, not making the emotion clearly defined despite the very comforting lyrics."

Ryan Love of Digital Spy gave the track three out of five stars and wrote that "Starsmith's typically twinkly production allows those vocals to shine through as she urges a potential boyfriend to help her become just the right kinda gal for him—and the overall effect is as sweet and pretty as a pink frosted cupcake." Michael Cragg of MusicOMH compared the song to Dido "with a more four-to-the-floor backing." Pitchfork's Stephen Troussé, however, referred negatively to it as "a big bluster of a song, with a chorus where the spectre of the Cranberries' Dolores O'Riordan is all too vivid, whose future success could be Goulding's undoing."

== Commercial performance ==
"The Writer" debuted at number 101 on the UK Singles Chart for the week ending 24 July 2010, entering the top 100 at number sixty-eight the following week. In its fifth week on the chart, the single peaked at number nineteen with 12,446 copies sold.

== Music video ==
The music video for "The Writer" was directed by Chris Cottam and filmed at Happisburgh Lighthouse in Happisburgh, Norfolk in June 2010 and was uploaded onto Goulding's official YouTube channel on 9 July 2010. The video shows Goulding walking around a field and exploring Happisburgh Lighthouse. It also includes in-studio sequences of her in front of a bright screen, giving the impression that she is in front of the actual light of the lighthouse.

== Track listings ==
UK digital download – EP
No.	Title	Length
1.	"The Writer"	4:14
2.	"The Writer" (Live Acoustic Version)	4:12
3.	"The Writer" (Alan Braxe Remix)	6:05
4.	"The Writer" (Friend's Electric Remix)	3:50

UK promo CD single
No.	Title	Length
1.	"The Writer" (Starsmith Edit)	3:43
2.	"The Writer" (Album Version)	4:14
3.	"The Writer" (Instrumental)	4:13

== Personnel ==
Credits were adapted from the liner notes of Lights.

- Ellie Goulding – vocals, acoustic guitar
- Stevie Blacke – live strings
- Joe Clegg – drums
- Julian Kindred – drum engineering
- Naweed – mastering
- Starsmith – bass, drum programming, keyboards, production
- Mark 'Spike' Stent – mixing
- Traffic – design

== Charts ==
"The Writer" chart performance
Chart (2010)	Peak position
European Hot 100 Singles	60
Scottish Singles Sales (Official Charts)	17
UK Singles (Official Charts)	19
