= Starry Eyed (Ellie Goulding song) =

2010 single by Ellie Goulding

Single by Ellie Goulding

from the album Lights
- B-side: "Fighter Plane"
- Released: 21 February 2010
- Genre: Electropop; disco
- Length: 2:57
- Label: Polydor
- Songwriters: Ellie Goulding; Jonny Lattimer
- Producer: Starsmith

Ellie Goulding singles chronology
"Under the Sheets" (2009)	"Starry Eyed" (2010)	"Guns and Horses" (2010)

Music video
- "Starry Eyed" (US Version) on YouTube

"Starry Eyed" is a song by English singer and songwriter Ellie Goulding, released as the second single from her debut studio album, Lights (2010). It was written by Goulding and Jonny Lattimer, while produced by Starsmith. Goulding made her debut US television performance on Jimmy Kimmel Live! on 7 April 2011, performing "Starry Eyed".

== Background ==
When asked what "Starry Eyed" was about, Goulding told Digital Spy:

It's about letting go. As opposed to all the sad and depressing things I write about, I decided to write something about the joining together of people in some kind of euphoric state—be it at a festival, at a show or in a club. I wanted a song that would reach out to people of every background and every enjoyment, whether you enjoy a natural high, taking drugs, drinking or whatever. Because I'm essentially a pop artist I wanted to write a song that everyone can relate to.

"Starry Eyed" was featured in the 2010 superhero film Kick-Ass and on its soundtrack. The song was used in the MTV teen drama series Teen Wolf and Awkward, as well as during a segment of the Victoria's Secret Fashion Show in November 2011.

== Composition ==
"Starry Eyed" is an electropop and disco song that features elements of folk, synth-pop, pop, and dance.

== Critical reception ==
Nick Levine wrote for Digital Spy that the song "manages to be folky, poppy and dancey all at the same time, twinkly but not twee, and otherworldly without losing its universal appeal." NME critic Mark Beaumont cited "Starry Eyed" as one of the album's "spangliest tracks" along with "Under the Sheets", commenting that it "finds Ellie love-struck and breathless [...] to disco diva beats and looped soul wails, sounding like an angelic Cheryl Cole."

== Commercial performance ==
"Starry Eyed" debuted at number four on the UK Singles Chart, selling 49,118 copies in its first week. The song spent two additional weeks at number four, selling 45,579 copies in its second week and 39,942 copies in its third week. "Starry Eyed" was certified platinum by the British Phonographic Industry (BPI) on 17 March 2017.

In late December 2025 and January 2026, the song became a popular TikTok trend. Following the rise in popularity, "Starry Eyed" re-entered the UK charts at number 51, 15 years after its original release.

== Music videos ==
The music video, directed by Ross Cooper and Bugsy Riverbank Steel of OneInThree, was filmed at Finsbury Town Hall in London and released on 20 January 2010. It sees Goulding in various costumes and settings of the venue as well as two acrobatic backup dancers dressed in fringe leotards. The video uses a visual styling effect used generally in sporting analysis called StroMotion which created the unique look of Goulding and the dancer's echoes, reverses and reverberations as they dance to the song.

A second music video, directed by Dugan O'Neal, was filmed at Painshill Park in Surrey, England, and released on 28 July 2011 for the North-American market. It features Goulding stargazing in the countryside with her on-screen boyfriend, with special effects used to make stars appear to whirl around her. Goulding is also seen in a Cystal Grotto wearing a silver dress, sporting blue eye contacts, and dancing around while lip-syncing. Towards the end of the video, Goulding and her boyfriend go to a tree where he places her hand on a tree in front of them, making geometric lines appear on the tree. When she looks back for her boyfriend, he turns around in a hood, and is hollow but filled with the night sky that zooms into, and show Goulding in a peach-yellow dress singing the last part of the song. The American version of the video also features product placement for Beats by Dr. Dre headphones and Mini Cooper, which can both be seen being used by Goulding within the first 26 seconds of the video.

== Cover versions ==
English band You Me at Six covered the song on the Live Lounge segment of BBC Radio 1's The Jo Whiley Show on 18 May 2010. Their version reached number 104 on the UK Singles Chart for the week ending 18 September 2010.

American singer Bridgit Mendler recorded an acoustic version of the song for her video series titled The Hurricane Sessions, with the music video released on YouTube on 8 May 2013. Sam Lansky of Idolator commented that Mendler's "husky voice works nicely with the song, especially toward the end, as it gets a little more emotive." The Huffington Post opined that her cover "show[s] off" her vocal range and added, "By slowing it down, Bridgit's version of the song sounds more intimate and relaxing, making it the perfect song for a 'rainy day' soundtrack." "Starry Eyed" was included on the set list of Mendler's Summer Tour in 2013. She also performed the song on the breakfast show The Strawberry Alarm Clock on the Dublin-based radio station FM104 on 30 October 2013.

== Track listings ==
- UK CD single
1. "Starry Eyed" – 2:58
2. "Starry Eyed" (Russ Chimes Remix) – 5:10
3. "Starry Eyed" (Little Noise Session) – 3:03
- UK digital EP
1. "Starry Eyed" – 2:57
2. "Starry Eyed" (Russ Chimes Remix) – 5:08
3. "Starry Eyed" (Little Noise Session) – 3:03
4. "Starry Eyed" (Penguin Prison Remix featuring Theophilus London) – 5:10
- UK limited-edition 10" single

A. "Starry Eyed" – 2:58

- German CD single
1. "Starry Eyed" – 2:57
2. "Fighter Plane" – 4:25
- German digital EP
1. "Starry Eyed" – 2:57
2. "Starry Eyed" (Russ Chimes Remix) – 5:08
3. "Starry Eyed" (Little Noise Session) – 3:03
4. "Starry Eyed" (Penguin Prison Remix featuring Theophilus London) – 5:10
5. "An Introduction to Ellie Goulding" (video) – 2:34
- US digital EP – The Remixes
1. "Starry Eyed" (Penguin Prison Remix) – 5:09
2. "Starry Eyed" (Jakwob Remix) – 4:35
3. "Starry Eyed" (Russ Chimes Remix) – 5:08
4. "Starry Eyed" (Monsieur Adi Remix) – 4:42
5. "Starry Eyed" (AN21 and Max Vangeli Remix) – 8:14

== Personnel ==
Credits were adapted from the liner notes of Lights.

- Ellie Goulding – songwriting, vocals
- Seye Adelekan – acoustic guitar, backing vocals
- Alan Clarke – photography
- Jonny Lattimer – songwriting
- Naweed – mastering
- Starsmith – bass, drum programming, keyboards, production
- Mark 'Spike' Stent – mixing

== Charts ==
=== Weekly charts ===
Chart (2010)	Peak position
Australia Dance (ARIA)	25
Australia Hitseekers (ARIA)	11
Austria (Ö3 Austria Top 40)	47
Belgium (Ultratip Bubbling Under Flanders)	14
Denmark Airplay (Tracklisten)	18
Europe (European Hot 100 Singles)	15
Germany (GfK)	46
Ireland (IRMA)	4
Israel International Airplay (Media Forest)	9
New Zealand (Recorded Music NZ)	26
Scottish Singles Sales (Official Charts)	3
Slovakia Airplay (ČNS IFPI)	36
UK Singles (Official Charts)	4

2026 weekly chart performance for "Starry Eyed"
Chart (2026)	Peak position
Ireland (IRMA)	22
UK Singles (Official Charts)	51

=== Year-end charts ===
Chart (2010)	Position
UK Singles (Official Charts Company)	42

== Certifications ==
Region	Certification	Certified units/sales
Norway (IFPI Norway)	Gold	5,000^{*}
United Kingdom (BPI)	Platinum	775,000
United States (RIAA)	Gold	500,000^{‡}
^{*} Sales figures based on certification alone.^{‡} Sales+streaming figures based on certification alone.

== Release history ==
Region	Date	Format	Label	Ref.
United Kingdom	21 February 2010	Digital download	Polydor	
United Kingdom	22 February 2010	CD single; 10" single	Polydor	
Germany	23 April 2010	Digital download	Universal	
Germany	7 May 2010	CD single	Universal	
United States	15 February 2011	Digital download – The Remixes	Cherrytree; Interscope	
