= Under the Sheets =

Single by Ellie Goulding

from the album Lights
- B-side: "Fighter Plane"
- Released: 9 November 2009
- Genre: Electropop
- Length: 3:44
- Label: Neon Gold
- Songwriters: Ellie Goulding; Starsmith
- Producer: Starsmith

Ellie Goulding singles chronology
"Under the Sheets" (2009)	"Starry Eyed" (2010)

Alternative cover
- German cover

Music video
- "Under the Sheets" on YouTube

"Under the Sheets" is a song by English singer and songwriter Ellie Goulding from her debut album, Lights (2010). Produced by Starsmith, it was released as the album's lead single and her debut single. The song premiered on Huw Stephens's BBC Radio 1 show on 30 September 2009 and was released on the UK iTunes Store on 15 November 2009, peaking at number fifty-three on the UK Singles Chart. It was also used to promote the second season of 90210 on E4 in the UK. According to Goulding, the single was released on independent label Neon Gold Records rather than Polydor so that she would not be put under too much pressure.

== Background ==
Speaking to DJ Steve Lamacq on his BBC Radio 2 show, Goulding said of "Under the Sheets":

["Under the Sheets"] was probably the easiest song I've written, but actually when I listen back to the lyrics they are actually quite meaningful. They are about a girl and a guy who are in a relationship but it's a very dark relationship in that it's only based on being physical. It's not like a sexual song, it's more like shows that some relationships are based on nothing that is real, they are not based on something good. I've had that experience in my life, because you're trying to cling on to something that you know you're in denial. That's what the song is about in that you know the world won't bring us down, you can be as happy as Larry inside your house with your boyfriend or lover, but as soon as you step outside you're in the real world and you have to deal with it.

== Critical reception ==
Digital Spy music editor Nick Levine rated "Under the Sheets" four out of five stars, writing that it is "that bit more magical than the average electropop tune, managing to sound twinkly and chunky at the same time, and the chorus is pretty much irresistible." He also described Goulding's voice as "pure, girlish and as fluttery as a butterfly trapped in a cupboard." The Guardian reviewer Alexis Petridis called it "a mildly anxious relationship memoir made over with digitised strings, breeze-block synths and crashing 1980s drums."

Fraser McAlpine of the BBC Chart Blog praised the track as an "immaculate frostypop masterpiece" and stated, "From the first 'like all the boys, boys, boys, boys' to the final go around on the pleading chorus, Ellie's voice dominates. There is barely a second of music which does not feature her vocal in some way, either as a muffled pixie choir, a lead instrument, or a soft, tumbledown wail in the background." Mark Beaumont from the NME cited the song as one of Lights' "spangliest tracks" along with "Starry Eyed", further commenting that it sees Goulding "in more bruised and bitter mood as producer Starsmith feeds her vulnerable vocals through an Auto-Tune the size of the Large Hadron Collider."

== Music video ==
The music video for "Under the Sheets" was directed by the Lennox Brothers and released on 22 October 2009. It opens with Goulding's hands playing a drum, to her with a black background, then leaving a bed occupied by an unknown male and walking through a brick building surrounded by different versions of herself. She can be seen sitting on the floor, playing guitar, writing her lyrics in her socks, riding a vintage bicycle and swinging in a hanging chair all simultaneously. She is also seen playing drums covered in glitter, and while sitting in a wicker chair a close shot of Goulding's hand with a heart drawn on the inside of her fingers is shown with her fingers opening and closing. Throughout the video Goulding wears a sequin top and high-top kicks and a plain shirt.

== Track listings ==
UK digital download – EP
No.	Title	Length
1.	"Under the Sheets"	3:46
2.	"Fighter Plane"	4:24
3.	"Under the Sheets" (Jakwob remix)	5:36
4.	"Under the Sheets" (Pariah remix)	4:50

UK 7" limited edition single
No.	Title	Length
1.	"A. Under the Sheets"	3:46
2.	"B. Fighter Plane"	4:24

German digital download and CD single
No.	Title	Length
1.	"Under the Sheets"	3:44
2.	"Guns and Horses" (Live at Metropolis Studios)	3:48

== Personnel ==
Credits were adapted from the liner notes of Lights.

- Ellie Goulding – vocals, acoustic guitar
- Charlie Morton – additional acoustic guitar, backing vocals
- Naweed – mastering
- Starsmith – bass, drum programming, keyboards, production
- Mark "Spike" Stent – mixing

== Charts ==
"Under the Sheets" chart performance
Chart (2009–10)	Peak position
Belgium (Ultratip Bubbling Under Flanders)	3
Denmark Airplay (Tracklisten)	2
Germany (GfK)	91
Scottish Singles Sales (Official Charts)	58
UK Singles (Official Charts)	53

== Release history ==
"Under the Sheets" release history
Region	Date	Format	Label	Ref.
United Kingdom	9 November 2009	7" single	Neon Gold	
United Kingdom	15 November 2009	Digital download	Polydor	
Belgium	15 November 2009	Digital download	Universal	
Germany	3 September 2010	Digital download	Universal	
Germany	17 September 2010	CD single	Universal	
