= By the End of the Night =

Single by Ellie Goulding

from the album Higher Than Heaven
- Released: 22 March 2023
- Genre: Electropop
- Length: 3:08
- Label: Polydor
- Songwriters: Ellie Goulding; Stephen Kozmeniuk; Trey Campbell
- Producer: KOZ

Ellie Goulding singles chronology
"Miracle" (2023)	"By the End of the Night" (2023)	"Somebody" (2023)

Visualiser
- "By the End of the Night" on YouTube

"By the End of the Night" is a song by English singer-songwriter Ellie Goulding. It was released on 22 March 2023 through Polydor Records, as the fourth single from her fifth studio album, Higher Than Heaven (2023). It was written by Goulding, Trey Campbell and Stephen Kozmeniuk. Kozmeniuk produced the track alone.

== Background and composition ==
About the making of "By the End of the Night", Goulding explained in an interview with NME:

"I feel like we've all been through such a lot over the last few years, we're still processing everything. I don't know if it's just me but I feel like we need music that uplifts us and makes us feel good and that's exactly how I feel about "By The End Of The Night." It gives me a sense of euphoric, sensual escape, like being on a dancefloor on another planet…something that was definitely appealing back in the late 80s… where this track could have easily come from!"

"By the End of the Night" is an electropop song. Alex Gonzalez from Uproxx stated that it "takes inspiration from '70s and '80s pop sounds, as she delivers soft-tinged vocals over a synth-heavy beat."

== Release and promotion ==
Goulding first posted a snippet of "By the End of the Night" through teasers during Higher Than Heaven's rollout. To promote the track, Goulding performed the track on The Late Late Show with James Corden. She also performed the track at Kew Gardens for her Amazon Freevee concert special, "Monumental: Ellie Goulding at Kew Gardens". The performance was later uploaded on Goulding's Vevo page.

Two remixes were released: the first being a remix by German DJ Southstar and the second an edit made by Neil Barrett, title "Morning After Edit". A compilation video of her performing the track at her shows at KOKO was released as a live performance.

== Credits ==
Credits were adapted from Spotify.

- Ellie Goulding – songwriting, vocals
- Trey Campbell – songwriting
- Stephen Kozmeniuk – songwriting, producer

== Charts ==
Chart performance
Chart (2023)	Peak position
Lithuania Airplay (TopHit)	52
UK Singles Sales (OCC)	82

== Release history ==
Release history and formats
Region	Date	Format	Version	Label	Ref.
Various	22 March 2023	Digital Download; Streaming	Original	Polydor	
Various	28 April 2023	Digital Download; Streaming	Southstar Remix	Polydor	
Various	23 June 2023	Digital Download; Streaming	Morning After Edit	Polydor	
