= TSHA =

TSHA may refer to:

- TSHA (musician), a British DJ and record producer
- Texas State Historical Association (TSHA), an American organization
