= Capricorn Sun =

Studio album by TSHA
- Released: 7 October 2022
- Genre: Electronic
- Length: 51:23
- Label: Ninja Tune

TSHA chronology
Capricorn Sun (2022)	Sad Girl (2024)

Capricorn Sun is the debut studio album by British DJ and record producer Teisha Matthews under the pseudonym TSHA. It was released on 7 October 2022 through Ninja Tune. It topped the UK Dance Albums Chart. It received universal acclaim from critics.

== Background ==
Capricorn Sun features guest appearances from Nimmo, Oumou Sangaré, Clementine Douglas, and Mafro. The album's title derives from TSHA's astrological sign. She explained, "I like to identify with some of the positive characteristics of a Capricorn: the hardiness and the work ethic... but also the sensitivity."

== Critical reception ==
Professional ratings
Aggregate scores
Source	Rating
Metacritic	81/100
Review scores
Source	Rating
AllMusic	4/5 stars
Clash	8/10
NME	4/5 stars
Pitchfork	7.2/10

According to the review aggregator Metacritic, Capricorn Sun received "universal acclaim" based on a weighted average score of 81 out of 100 from 4 critic scores.

Ben Cardew of Pitchfork commented that "TSHA casually throws house, UK garage, R&B, pop, and breakbeats into the mix, in keeping with the relaxed dilettantism currently heard across much modern dance music." Ana Lamond of Clash described the album as "a pop-focussed listen that wholly embraces its vocal elements as a driving force, urging its crowds to join along, all as one." Paul Simpson of AllMusic stated, "While generally sunny and celebratory, the album is shaded with feelings of heartache and anxiety, inspired by personal issues, friends and family members, and club closure due to pandemic lockdown." He added, "Well-sequenced and brimming with heartfelt energy, Capricorn Sun is an inspired effort."

Capricorn Sun won the "Dance Album Project of the Year" award at the 2022 BBC Radio 1 Dance Awards, as well as the "Best Album" award at the 2022 DJ Mag Best of British Awards.

=== Accolades ===
Year-end lists for Capricorn Sun
Publication	List	Rank	Ref.
Double J	The 50 Best Albums of 2022	12	
NME	The 25 Best Debut Albums of 2022	—	
PopMatters	The Best Electronic Albums of 2022	—	

== Track listing ==
Capricorn Sun track listing
No.	Title	Length
1.	"Galdem (Intro)"	1:48
2.	"The Light"	4:59
3.	"OnlyL" (featuring Nimmo)	3:48
4.	"Water" (featuring Oumou Sangaré)	4:58
5.	"Dancing in the Shadows" (featuring Clementine Douglas)	4:37
6.	"Giving Up" (featuring Mafro)	3:23
7.	"Anxious Mind" (featuring Clementine Douglas)	3:27
8.	"Time"	5:34
9.	"Power"	4:18
10.	"Running"	3:52
11.	"Sister"	4:28
12.	"Nala (Outro)"	4:55
Total length:		51:23

== Charts ==
Chart performance for Capricorn Sun
Chart (2022)	Peak position
UK Album Downloads (OCC)	20
UK Dance Albums (OCC)	1
