= Monumental: Ellie Goulding at Kew Gardens =

- Promotional poster
- Directed by: Liz Clare
- Starring: Ellie Goulding; Roman Kemp; Carly Cowell
- Edited by: Salia Hovanec; David Jakubovic
- Music by: Ellie Goulding
- Production companies: 2929 Productions; Artists Den Entertainment
- Distributed by: Amazon Freevee
- Release date: March 31, 2023
- Running time: 53 minutes
- Country: United States
- Language: English

Monumental: Ellie Goulding at Kew Gardens is a documentary concert film centring around the English singer-songwriter Ellie Goulding, directed by Liz Clare. It was released on Amazon Freevee on March 31, 2023.

== Summary ==
Singer-songwriter Ellie Goulding performs at Kew Gardens in London, and also chats with radio host Roman Kemp about her new album Higher Than Heaven and life as a mother, and discusses environmental issues with Dr. Carly Cowell, the senior science policy advisor at Royal Botanic Gardens, Kew. Goulding's performance includes acoustic performances of her old and new songs.

== Set list ==
Set list adapted from the special itself.

1. "Cure for Love"
2. "Still Falling for You"
3. "Burn"
4. "Love Goes On"
5. "Like a Saviour"
6. "Let It Die"
7. "Midnight Dreams"
8. "By the End of the Night"
9. "Woman"
10. "Higher Than Heaven"
11. "Lights"

== Production ==
On February 13, 2023, Amazon Freevee announced the greenlight of Monumental: An Artists Den Experience, a series of hour-long specials, with the first installment starring Ellie Goulding, and each installment featuring a performance by and interview with a popular recording artist. The specials was created and executive produced by Mark Lieberman, with Todd Wagner, Mark Cuban, and Haley Jones also executive producing.

The deluxe version of Higher Than Heaven will include six bonus tracks from Goulding's performance at Kew Gardens.

== Release ==
The film premiered on Amazon Freevee on March 31, 2023. The special, earned a nomination and won for Best Variety Television at the 33rd annual Environmental Media Association ceremony.
