= Let It Die =

Let It Die may refer to:

- Let It Die (album), 2004 album by Canadian singer-songwriter Feist; or its title track
- "Let It Die" (Foo Fighters song), 2007
- "Let It Die" (Ellie Goulding song), 2022
- ”Let It Die”, a song by Ellie Goulding from Delirium (2015).
- Let It Die (video game), 2016 video game created by developer Grasshopper Manufacture
