= Somebody (TSHA, Ellie Goulding and Gregory Porter song) =

Single by TSHA, Ellie Goulding and Gregory Porter
- Released: 14 September 2023
- Genre: Electronic
- Length: 3:55
- Label: Ninja Tune
- Lyricists: Ellie Goulding; Teisha Matthews; Matthew Phelan
- Producers: TSHA; MAFRO

TSHA singles chronology
"Killing Me" (2022)	"Somebody" (2023)	"Sweet Devotion" (2024)

Ellie Goulding singles chronology
"By the End of the Night" (2023)	"Somebody" (2023)	"Free" (2024)

Gregory Porter singles chronology
"Out of My Control" (2021)	"Somebody" (2023)

Music video
- "Somebody" on YouTube

"Somebody" is a song by the English DJ and record producer TSHA with vocal performances of singer-songwriter Ellie Goulding and American singer Gregory Porter, released on 14 September 2023, throughout TSHA's independent record label, Ninja Tune. It was written by Ellie Goulding, Teisha Matthews, and Matthew Phelan, and produced by TSHA and MAFRO. It marks the trio first collaboration, although TSHA previously remixed Goulding' single "New Love" featuring Silk City in 2021.

== Background and release ==
Speaking about the origin of the collaboration, TSHA stated throughout her label Ninja Tune press release:

"The idea for this collaboration was sparked by Ellie sliding into my DMs last year to reach out about a session. I of course jumped at the opportunity in a heartbeat – she's someone that I've admired and respected for a long time, so to have the opportunity to work together was a complete no brainer for me. It's been an absolute pleasure working together on 'Somebody', Ellie's a real sweetheart and I'm so pleased with how the track has come together. The icing on the cake is the vocals that Gregory Porter has added, which for me really elevate the track and add another dimension to the music. Having a living legend like Gregory featuring on my music is a huge milestone moment for me." – TSHA, talking about "Somebody"

The collaboration was released on 14 September 2023. An official visualizer was released on the same day on TSHA official YouTube page.

A trance remix by Trance Wax was released on 4 January 2024.

== Performances ==
TSHA performed the Trance Wax remix on many of her DJ gigs before and after the mix was released.

Ellie Goulding performed "Somebody" at ARTE.tv's Bailose Session on 3 November 2023. Goulding included "Somebody" in the setlist for her UK and European Higher Than Heaven Tour dates.

== Critical reception ==
Somebody was met with widespread critical acclaim from music critics, who praised the musical production and vocal performances of Goulding and Porter. Molly M of This Song Is Sick stated that "Somebody" was "one of her [TSHA] most star-studded tracks to date" and praised Goulding's vocals "Ellie bursts into the track with vibrant, nostalgic melodies, exploring a variety of cadences overtop the solid foundation laid out by TSHA." and Porter's addition to the track "Just when you think the track has reached its peak, Gregory joins the party to bring the main hook home, passionately singing the line “I really need somebody” in harmony with Goulding." Rolling Stones India praised the track and said "as catchy as it is moody, cinematic and well, proof that TSHA is one of the brightest up and comers today, across any genre. The fact that Goulding and Porter are supporting the talent and easily their contributions outshine even their own recent personal outings showcases the fact that this single is special." Katie Bain from Billboard included the song on her "Best New Dance Tracks of the Week" list, saying: "TSHA checks in with a somber but resolute, and also resonant, collab with Ellie Goulding and Grammy-winning soul singer Gregory Porter. Over the London producer's shuffling, tinny beat, Goulding references post-pandemic anxieties in singing 'Feelin' older than my years/ But ain't it so when you've been staying home?' with her genuinely contemplative-sounding delivery juxtaposed with Porter's earnest plea that 'I really need somebody'", and described the vibe of the song as "Lonely and pretty".

=== Year-end lists ===
Appearances on year-end lists
Publication	List	Rank	Ref.
Rolling Stone India	Top 100 Songs of 2023	56	

== Track listing ==
- Digital download / streaming single
1. "Somebody" – 3:55
- Digital download / streaming – Trance Wax remix
1. "Somebody" (Trance Wax Remix) – 2:51
2. "Somebody" – 3:55

== Charts ==
Chart performance of "Somebody"
Chart (2023)	Peak position
Belgium (Radio Electronic Songs)	8

== Release history ==
Release history and formats for "Somebody"
Region	Date	Format	Version	Label	Ref.
Various	14 September 2023	Digital download; streaming	Original	Ninja Tune	
Various	4 January 2024	Digital download; streaming	Trance Wax Remix	Ninja Tune	
