= All by Myself (Alok, Sigala and Ellie Goulding song) =

2022 single by Alok, Sigala and Ellie Goulding

Single by Alok, Sigala and Ellie Goulding

from the album Every Cloud – Silver Linings
- Released: 7 October 2022
- Genre: Dance-pop
- Length: 2:51
- Label: Sony
- Songwriters: Alok Petrillo; Andrew Wells; Anthony Rossomando; Elena Goulding; Martin Gore; OhYes; Tom Mann
- Producers: Alok; Sigala; OhYes; Andrew Wells

Alok singles chronology
"Slow It Down" (2022)	"All by Myself" (2022)	"Kill Me" (2022)

Sigala singles chronology
"Living Without You" (2022)	"All by Myself" (2022)	"Rely on Me" (2022)

Ellie Goulding singles chronology
"Easy Lover" (2022)	"All by Myself" (2022)	"Let It Die" (2022)

Music video
- "All by Myself" on YouTube

"All by Myself" is a song by the Brazilian DJ Alok, the English DJ Sigala, and the English singer and songwriter Ellie Goulding. It was released through Sony Music on 7 October 2022. The song was written by Alok, Andrew Wells, Anthony Rossomando, Goulding, Martin Gore, OhYes, and Tom Mann, and produced by Alok, Sigala, OhYes, and Wells. It appears in the deluxe edition of Goulding's fifth studio album, Higher Than Heaven (2023). An accompanying music video was released on 12 December 2022.

== Background ==
Alok started working on the song in 2021 using Goulding's vocals; however, he stopped as it was not turning out the way he wanted. He then revisited the song and decided to use a sample of Depeche Mode's 1990 song "Enjoy the Silence". After obtaining sample clearance from the band, he finished working on the song with Sigala's help. On 4 October 2022, Alok announced the collaboration along with its cover artwork and release date on his social media accounts.

== Credits and personnel ==
Credits adapted from Tidal.

- Alok Achkar Peres Petrillo – songwriting, production
- Bruce Fielder – production, programming, keyboards
- Elena Goulding – vocals, songwriting
- OhYes – songwriting, production, programming, bass, drums, keyboards
- Andrew Wells – songwriting, production, keyboards
- Anthony Rossomando – songwriting
- Martin Gore – songwriting
- Tom Mann – songwriting
- João Cruz – guitar
- One Mix Mastering – mastering engineer, mixing engineer

== Charts ==
=== Weekly charts ===
Weekly chart performance for "All by Myself"
Chart (2022–2023)	Peak position
Belgium (Ultratop 50 Flanders)	22
Belgium (Ultratop 50 Wallonia)	43
CIS Airplay (TopHit)	1
Croatia International Airplay (Top lista)	20
Czech Republic Airplay (ČNS IFPI)	48
France (SNEP)	116
Finland Airplay (Radiosoittolista)	7
Germany Airplay (BVMI)	4
Hungary (Dance Top 40)	4
Hungary (Rádiós Top 40)	2
Netherlands (Dutch Top 40)	19
Netherlands (Single Top 100)	70
New Zealand Hot Singles (RMNZ)	30
Poland (Polish Airplay Top 100)	9
Russia Airplay (TopHit)	1
San Marino (SMRRTV Top 50)	37
Slovakia Airplay (ČNS IFPI)	13
Ukraine Airplay (TopHit)	7
US Hot Dance/Electronic Songs (Billboard)	26

=== Year-end charts ===
2023 year-end chart performance for "All by Myself"
Chart (2023)	Position
Hungary (Dance Top 40)	26
Hungary (Rádiós Top 40)	27
Russia Airplay (TopHit)	27
Ukraine Airplay (TopHit)	69

2024 year-end chart performance for "All by Myself"
Chart (2024)	Position
Belarus Airplay (TopHit)	130
Hungary (Dance Top 40)	19
Lithuania Airplay (TopHit)	69

2025 year-end chart performance for "All by Myself"
Chart (2025)	Position
Hungary (Dance Top 40)	38
Lithuania Airplay (TopHit)	160

== Certifications ==
Certifications for "All by Myself"
Region	Certification	Certified units/sales
Brazil (Pro-Música Brasil)	2× Platinum	160,000^{‡}
France (SNEP)	Gold	100,000^{‡}
Norway (IFPI Norway)	Gold	30,000^{‡}
Poland (ZPAV)	Gold	25,000^{‡}
^{‡} Sales+streaming figures based on certification alone.

== Release history ==
Release dates and formats for "All by Myself"
Region	Date	Format(s)	Label(s)	Ref.
Various	7 October 2022	Digital download; streaming	Sony	
Italy	13 October 2022	Radio airplay	Sony	
