= Miracle (Calvin Harris and Ellie Goulding song) =

2023 song by Calvin Harris and Ellie Goulding

Single by Calvin Harris and Ellie Goulding
- Released: 10 March 2023
- Recorded: January 2023
- Genre: Trance
- Length: 3:06
- Label: Columbia; Sony Music UK
- Songwriters: Adam Wiles; Ellie Goulding; Pablo Bowman; Peter Rycroft; Matthew Burns
- Producers: Calvin Harris; Burns

Calvin Harris singles chronology
"New to You" (2022)	"Miracle" (2023)	"Desire" (2023)

Ellie Goulding singles chronology
"Like a Saviour" (2023)	"Miracle" (2023)	"By the End of the Night" (2023)

Calvin Harris and Ellie Goulding singles chronology
"Outside" (2014)	"Miracle" (2023)	"Free" (2024)

Music video
- "Miracle" on YouTube

"Miracle" is a song by the Scottish DJ and record producer Calvin Harris and the English singer Ellie Goulding. It was released as a single on 10 March 2023 through Columbia Records and Sony Music UK and included on Harris' first compilation album, 96 Months (2024). It is a trance song inspired by Eurodance and techno that uses piano and synths in its production.

The song was nominated for the inaugural Grammy Award for Best Pop Dance Recording at the 66th Annual Grammy Awards, Harris' first nomination since 2018 and Goulding's first since 2016. It was also nominated for the Brit Award for Song Of The Year at the Brit Awards 2024 and won the Most Played Song Award at the Global Awards 2024.

== Background ==
Before the release of "Miracle", Harris and Goulding had released two collaborations: "I Need Your Love" in 2012 and "Outside" in 2014. Harris later texted Goulding, asking her to collaborate with him on "Miracle". On 12 January 2023, Harris posted a picture of him and Goulding together in a recording studio. Goulding first performed parts of the song a cappella inside St Bartholomew-the-Great which was uploaded on TikTok by both artists.

According to Harris, creating the song took him back to his early producing days in the late 1990s, having taken "bits from that" and putting it "in a new context". He chose Goulding as the vocalist, citing her "angelic voice" and calling her the only one capable of delivering the vocals on the song.

== Release ==
Miracle was released alongside an animated lyric video. A music video for "Miracle" was released on 24 March 2023, depicting Goulding in a crown and being circled by dancers and lasers. Dutch DJ Hardwell's big room trance remix of "Miracle" was premiered during his headlining performance at Ultra Music Festival in March 2023 before it was officially released on 14 April 2023. A house remix of "Miracle" by Mau P was released on 21 April 2023.

== Performances ==
During his headlining performance at Coachella in April 2023, Harris brought out Goulding as a guest for their first live performance of "Miracle". Harris also performed "Miracle" as the closer for his set during Primavera Sound in Barcelona in June 2023.

Ellie Goulding performed "Miracle" at American Idol's Season 21 grand finale stage in May 2023. Goulding included "Miracle" in the setlist for her UK and European Higher Than Heaven Tour dates.

== Composition ==
"Miracle" is an uptempo, 1990s- and early 2000s-inspired trance song with inspiration from techno and a Eurodance-inspired beat combined with "ethereal" piano, "glittering", "repetitive" synths, heavy bass, a "soft" organ, and fast kick drums in its production. Goulding sings with "soft-tinged" vocals on the song. Rolling Stone, in their list of the one-hundred best songs of 2023, called the collaboration "another electropop smash" and "a psychelic EDM hit".

== Critical reception ==
Billboard's Katie Bain and The Sunday Times both described the song as reminiscent of record producer Robert Miles' work. Tom Breihan of Stereogum wrote that there was "nothing particularly inventive" about "Miracle", but that "you might have a good time with [it]" if "you have any room in your heart for absolute cheeseball dance jams". Vogue's Liam Hess called the song "fiendishly addictive". Of "Miracle", Tyler Golsen of Far Out wrote, "Vibrant, maximalist, and just the right amount of cheesy, 'Miracle' is undeniably catchy, if not a bit rote," also writing that it was "certainly not a revelation". For The Music, Emma Whines called the song's hook "a true standout".

=== Year-end lists ===
Select year-end rankings of "Miracle"
Publication	List	Rank	Ref.
BBC	The Best Songs of 2023	Honorable; Mention	
Billboard	The 30 Best Dance Songs of 2023	Listed	
EDM House Network	Top 50 Best Dance Tracks of 2023	3rd	
Mixmag	The Best Tracks of the Year 2023	Listed	
Rolling Stone	The 100 Best Songs of 2023	93rd	

== Commercial performance ==
"Miracle" debuted at number three on the UK Singles Chart for the week dated 17 March 2023. It was Goulding's 12th and Harris' 29th top-10 hit on the chart and their highest-charting collaboration. The song also made Goulding the British female solo artist with the most entries on the chart overall. It reached number one three weeks later, giving Harris his 11th chart-topping single and Goulding her fourth. This gave Harris the eighth most number-ones on the chart of any artist, surpassing Eminem and Elton John, and Goulding the third most number-ones of any British female artist, behind Jess Glynne and Cheryl. In its second week at number one, Goulding's album Higher Than Heaven also debuted atop the UK Albums Chart, marking the first time Goulding simultaneously had a number-one single and album. "Miracle" stayed atop the chart for eight non-consecutive weeks, becoming Goulding's longest-running number-one and tying "One Kiss", which also held at number one for eight weeks, as Harris' longest-running number one on the chart.

== Track listing ==
- Digital download / streaming
1. "Miracle" – 3:06
- Digital download / streaming – Church Version
1. "Miracle" (Church Version) – 2:44
- Digital download / streaming – Hardwell Remix
1. "Miracle" (Hardwell Remix) – 3:05
- Digital download / streaming – Mau P Remix
1. "Miracle" (Mau P Remix) – 3:37
- Digital download / streaming – Wilkinson Remix
1. "Miracle" (Wilkinson Remix) – 3:35
- Digital download / streaming – David Guetta Remix
1. "Miracle" (David Guetta Remix) – 3:02
- Digital download / streaming – MK Remix
1. "Miracle" (MK Remix) – 3:28
- Digital download / streaming – ACRAZE Remix
1. "Miracle" (ACRAZE Remix) – 4:13
- Digital download / streaming – Remixes
1. "Miracle" (Hardwell Remix) – 3:04
2. "Miracle" (Mau P Remix) – 3:37
3. "Miracle" (Wilkinson Remix) – 3:35
4. "Miracle" (David Guetta Remix) – 3:02
5. "Miracle" (MK Remix) – 3:28
6. "Miracle" (ACRAZE Remix) – 4:13
7. "Miracle" (BURNS Sunset Mix) – 3:20
8. "Miracle" (Dimitri Vegas & Like Mike vs. Bassjackers Remix) – 3:06
9. "Miracle" (Creeds Remix) – 4:27
10. "Miracle" (Nicky Romero Remix) – 3:26
11. "Miracle" (Valentino Khan Remix) – 2:39
12. "Miracle" (Ben Nicky Remix) – 3:49
13. "Miracle" (Tyson O'Brien × Jordan Brando Remix) – 2:59
14. "Miracle" (Breaks Mix) – 3:08
15. "Miracle" (Extended) – 4:55
16. "Miracle" (Hardwell Extended Remix) – 5:25
17. "Miracle" (Mau P Extended Remix) – 6:01
18. "Miracle" (Wilkinson Extended Remix) – 4:11
19. "Miracle" (David Guetta Extended Remix) – 4:14
20. "Miracle" (MK Extended Remix) – 6:19
21. "Miracle" (ACRAZE Extended Remix) – 7:15
22. "Miracle" (Dimitri Vegas & Like Mike vs. Bassjackers Extended Remix) – 3:59
23. "Miracle" (Creeds Extended Remix) – 5:15
24. "Miracle" (Nicky Romero Extended Remix) – 4:30
25. "Miracle" (Valentino Khan Extended Remix) – 2:53
26. "Miracle" (Ben Nicky Extended Remix) – 5:19
27. "Miracle" (Tyson O'Brien × Jordan Brando Extended Remix) – 5:27

== Charts ==
=== Weekly charts ===
Weekly chart performance for "Miracle"
Chart (2023–2024)	Peak position
Australia (ARIA)	13
Australia Club (ARIA)	2
Australia Dance (ARIA)	1
Austria (Ö3 Austria Top 40)	44
Belgium (Ultratop 50 Flanders)	3
Belgium (Ultratop 50 Wallonia)	3
Bulgaria Airplay (PROPHON)	10
Canada Hot 100 (Billboard)	71
Colombia Anglo Airplay (Monitor Latino)	5
Czech Republic Airplay (ČNS IFPI)	27
Czech Republic Singles Digital (ČNS IFPI)	74
Denmark (Tracklisten)	18
Finland (Suomen virallinen radiolista)	14
France (SNEP)	20
Germany (GfK)	43
Global 200 (Billboard)	41
Hungary (Dance Top 40)	7
Hungary (Rádiós Top 40)	2
Hungary (Single Top 40)	12
Ireland (IRMA)	1
Japan Hot Overseas (Billboard Japan)	10
Lithuania (AGATA)	27
Luxembourg (Billboard)	10
Netherlands (Dutch Top 40)	2
Netherlands (Single Top 100)	6
New Zealand (Recorded Music NZ)	37
Nigeria (TurnTable Top 100)	30
Norway (VG-lista)	27
Poland (Polish Airplay Top 100)	3
Poland (Polish Streaming Top 100)	31
Portugal (AFP)	131
Russia Airplay (TopHit)	8
San Marino Airplay (SMRTV Top 50)	37
Slovakia Airplay (ČNS IFPI)	31
Slovakia Singles Digital (ČNS IFPI)	51
Suriname (Nationale Top 40)	12
Sweden (Sverigetopplistan)	22
Switzerland (Schweizer Hitparade)	23
UK Singles (Official Charts)	1
UK Dance (Official Charts)	1
US Hot Dance/Electronic Songs (Billboard)	6
US Pop Airplay (Billboard)	40

=== Monthly charts ===
Monthly chart performance for "Miracle"
Chart (2023)	Peak position
Russia Airplay (TopHit)	11

=== Year-end charts ===
2023 year-end chart performance for "Miracle"
Chart (2023)	Position
Australia (ARIA)	48
Belarus Airplay (TopHit)	42
Belgium (Ultratop 50 Flanders)	10
Belgium (Ultratop 50 Wallonia)	14
CIS Airplay (TopHit)	24
Denmark (Tracklisten)	51
Germany (Official German Charts)	98
Global 200 (Billboard)	135
Hungary (Dance Top 40)	50
Hungary (Rádiós Top 40)	23
Iceland (Tónlistinn)	96
Netherlands (Dutch Top 40)	4
Netherlands (Single Top 100)	11
Poland (Polish Airplay Top 100)	40
Russia Airplay (TopHit)	29
Sweden (Sverigetopplistan)	81
Switzerland (Schweizer Hitparade)	83
UK Singles (OCC)	5
US Hot Dance/Electronic Songs (Billboard)	12

2024 year-end chart performance for "Miracle"
Chart (2024)	Position
Australia Dance (ARIA)	47
Belarus Airplay (TopHit)	192
CIS Airplay (TopHit)	196
Hungary (Dance Top 40)	27

2025 year-end chart performance for "Miracle"
Chart (2025)	Position
Hungary (Dance Top 40)	49

== Certifications ==
Certifications for "Miracle"
Region	Certification	Certified units/sales
Australia (ARIA)	2× Platinum	140,000^{‡}
Austria (IFPI Austria)	Gold	15,000^{‡}
Belgium (BRMA)	2× Platinum	80,000^{‡}
Denmark (IFPI Danmark)	Platinum	90,000^{‡}
France (SNEP)	Diamond	333,333^{‡}
Hungary (MAHASZ)	2× Platinum	8,000^{‡}
Italy (FIMI)	Gold	50,000^{‡}
New Zealand (RMNZ)	Platinum	30,000^{‡}
Poland (ZPAV)	2× Platinum	100,000^{‡}
Portugal (AFP)	Gold	5,000^{‡}
Spain (Promusicae)	Platinum	60,000^{‡}
Switzerland (IFPI Switzerland)	2× Platinum	40,000^{‡}
United Kingdom (BPI)	2× Platinum	1,200,000^{‡}
United States (RIAA)	Gold	500,000^{‡}
Streaming
Greece (IFPI Greece)	Gold	1,000,000^{†}
^{‡} Sales+streaming figures based on certification alone.^{†} Streaming-only figures based on certification alone.

== Release history ==
Release dates and formats for "Miracle"
Region	Date	Format	Label	Ref.
Various	10 March 2023	Digital download; streaming	Columbia Records; Sony Music UK	
United States	6 June 2023	Contemporary hit radio	Columbia Records; Sony Music UK	

== See also ==
- List of Billboard number-one dance songs of 2023
- List of number-one singles of 2023 (Ireland)
- List of UK Singles Chart number ones of the 2020s
