= Higher Than Heaven =

- Standard edition artwork

Studio album by Ellie Goulding
- Released: 7 April 2023
- Studio: Clean Bandit (London)
- Genres: Dance-pop; pop
- Length: 36:42
- Label: Polydor
- Producers: The 23rd; Greg Kurstin; Koz; Lostboy; Happy Perez; Jesse Shatkin; Watt; Andrew Wells

Ellie Goulding chronology
Halcyon Nights (2020)	Higher Than Heaven (2023)	I Know Too Much (2026)

Deluxe album cover
- Artwork used on all streaming platforms

Singles from Higher Than Heaven
- 1. "Easy Lover" Released: 15 July 2022; 2. "Let It Die" Released: 19 October 2022; 3. "Like a Saviour" Released: 1 February 2023; 4. "By the End of the Night" Released: 22 March 2023

Higher Than Heaven is the fifth studio album by English singer-songwriter Ellie Goulding. It was released on 7 April 2023, through Polydor Records, serving as a follow-up to her fourth studio album, Brightest Blue (2020). Written largely in response to the COVID-19 pandemic, Goulding deliberately shifted the album's focus away from the deep introspection of its predecessor, describing it as her "least personal album" to date in favour of escapism and pure thrills. The album spawned four singles: "Easy Lover" featuring Big Sean, "Let It Die", "Like a Saviour", and "By the End of the Night".

Produced by Greg Kurstin, Jesse Shatkin, Koz, Andrew Wells, and among others, Higher Than Heaven is a dance-pop and pop record that draws heavy influence from synth-pop, disco, and 1990s house music. Lyrically, the album focuses on universal themes of love and human connection rather than personal narratives. With generally favourable reviews, Higher Than Heaven debuted at number one on the UK Albums Chart, marking Goulding's fourth chart-topping album in the country, and tying her with Adele for the most UK number one albums by a British female artist.

== Background and development ==
There was definitely a darkness about [the past two years] that was palpable in the studio, with everyone having gone through it differently. I think for that reason, nobody wanted to sit and agonise over some relationship or some drama. So that's how this album came together. [Higher Than Heaven is] about being passionately in love. But it's a hyper form of love, almost like a drug induced feeling. It feels almost artificial and there's the potential for a crash.

— Goulding, talking about the album's inspiration

According to Goulding, Higher Than Heaven was written in response to the COVID-19 pandemic. She noted that the palpable "darkness" of the preceding two years, which everyone had experienced differently, meant that "nobody wanted to sit and agonise over some relationship or some drama"; she stated that this context was key to "how this album came together". In contrast to her previous 2020 album Brightest Blue, Higher Than Heaven is her "least personal album", because she wanted a different direction from the introspective tone of her previous record and was "not in the mood to sing about myself". Moreover, she explained that the sense of relief stemmed from the album not being based on her personal experiences, describing it as refreshing to step away from writing about events that had "deeply" affected her.

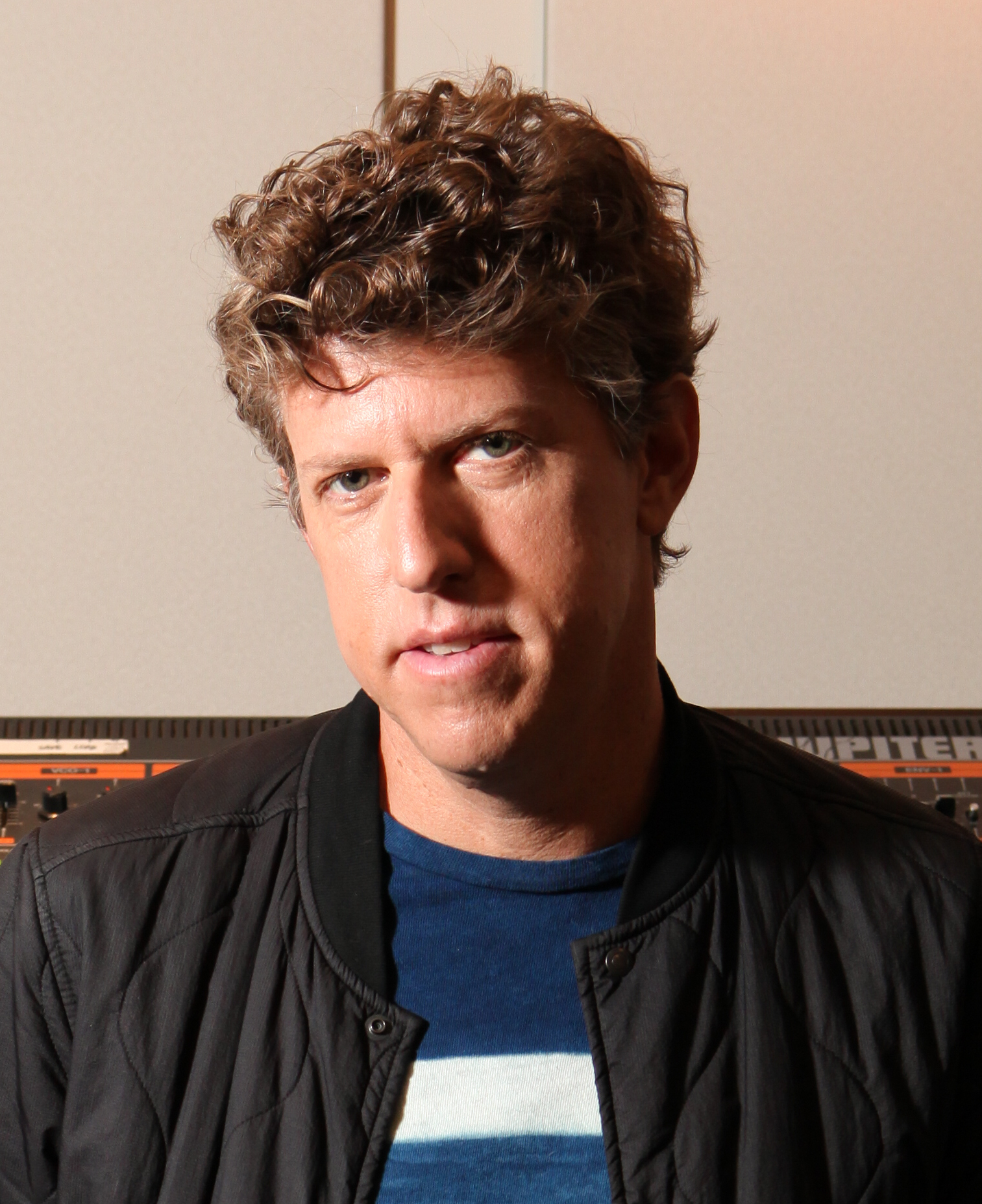
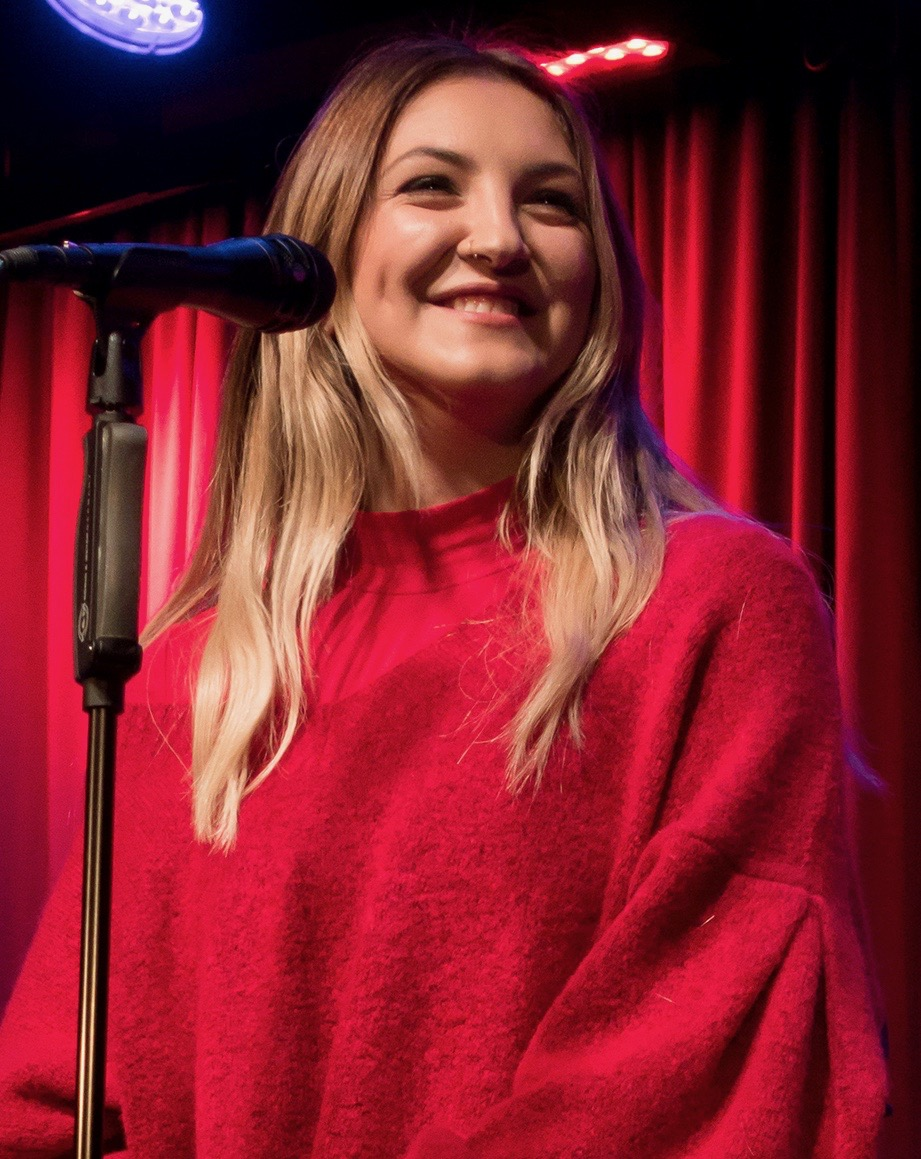
Goulding wrote "Easy Lover" with Greg Kurstin (left) and Julia Michaels (right), during 2017 in Los Angeles.

Discussing the single "Easy Lover" in 2022, Goulding explained that she wrote the song about five years earlier in Los Angeles with producer Greg Kurstin and songwriter Julia Michaels. Regarding her writing style, the singer said she tended to write about shared experiences, stating, "I can't help but write about situations we all go through." She added that she liked the idea of listeners taking "some kind of advice or some help" from her music, and expressed a preference for combining this relatability with her influences in house, dance, and pop music. Separately, Goulding noted that the song in her discography she would always relate to is her 2012 hit "Anything Could Happen", explaining, "It's just the feeling I get every time I perform it", and she added that the song "defines me the best".

=== Artistic direction ===
Goulding told NME that her artistic focus involved acknowledging her strengths, stating that she was "good at writing pop songs". She further said that, despite working across a range of musical styles such as classical music throughout her career, she ultimately preferred creating "big pop songs that you hear on the radio". Since Higher Than Heaven allowed her to different aspects of herself, Goulding considered the record as her "best album". She also particularly enjoyed the sheer acts of writing and singing again; she found the process to be a "relief and really refreshing", as it meant she did not have to dwell on or revisit all the deeply felt personal events that had happened to her in the studio. She further stated that there was "an element of escapism" in the album and that she aimed to move away from the more introspective tone of Brightest Blue, adding that she "wasn't really in the mood to write ballads".

== Composition ==
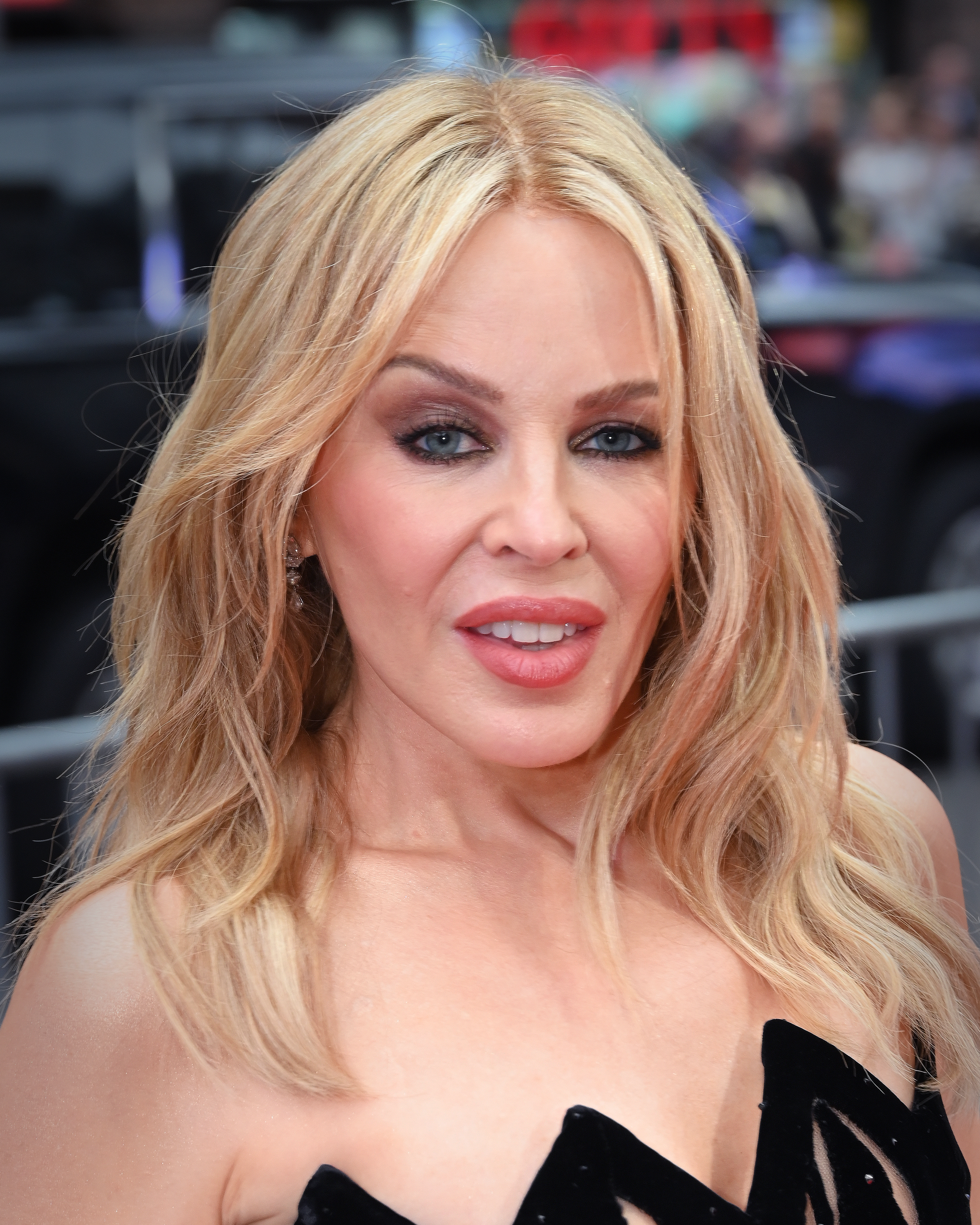
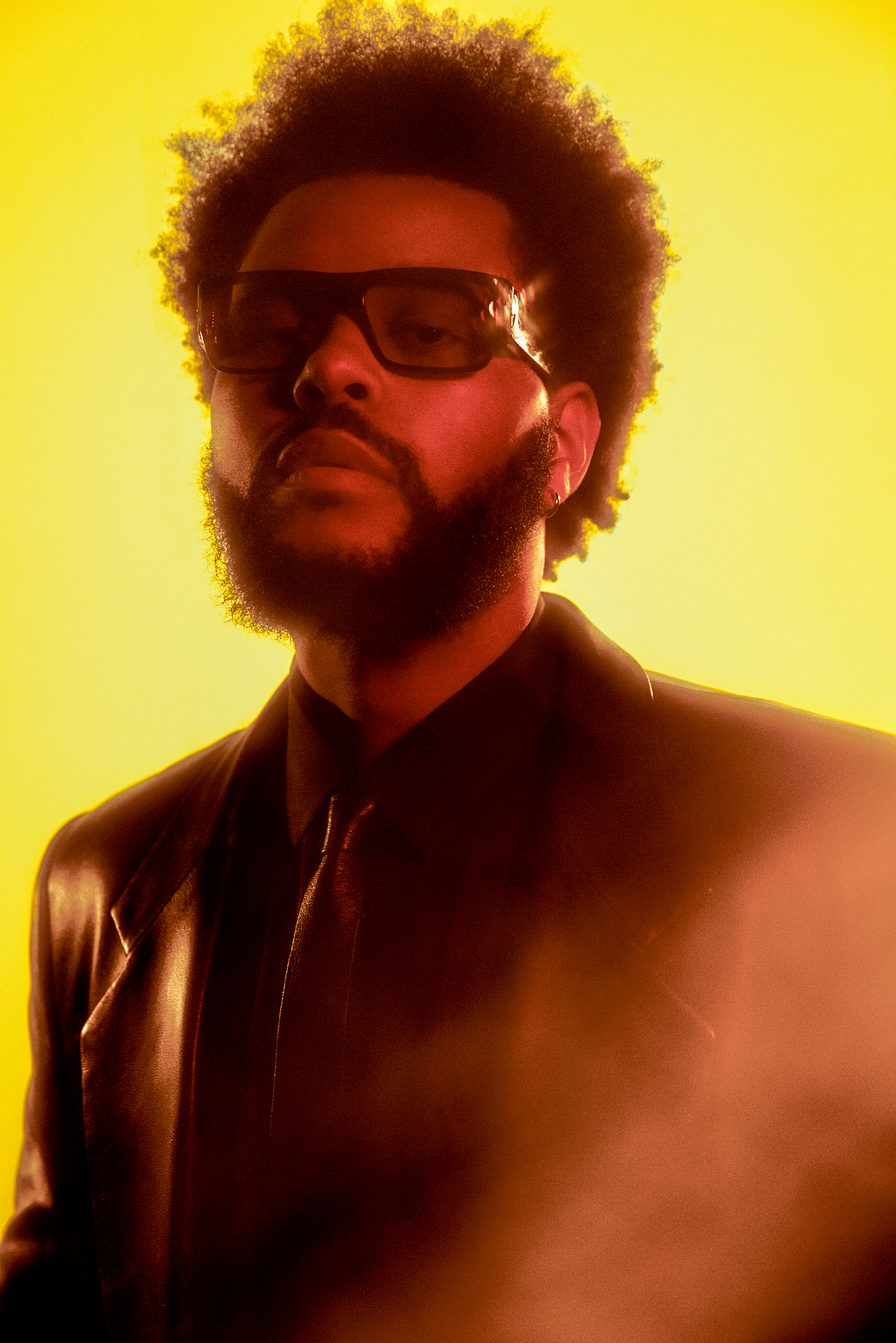
Goulding drew influences from "dance-pop stateswomen" like Kylie Minogue (left), and cited the Weeknd (right) among a diverse mix of artists shaping the album's sound.

Higher Than Heaven is a pop and dance-pop record, incorporating influences from 1980s synth-pop and disco-pop. It is described as "top notch", with Marisa Whitaker of Spin noting the prominence of Goulding's vocals. According to AllMusic's Neil Z. Yeung, the album is composed of "set of synth-washed, neon bangers" and places greater emphasis on energetic, club-driven production rather than the subdued approach of its predecessor. Furthermore, it contains "stomping basslines, soaring synths and euphoric melodies" featuring contributions from Greg Kurstin, Jesse Shatkin, Koz, and Andrew Wells. According to uDiscoverMusic's Rhian Daly, the lyrics of Higher Than Heaven focus on broader subjects such as love, desire, and human connection, in contrast to the more personal material of Brightest Blue.

Peter Piatkowski of PopMatters identified Higher Than Heaven as a "solid set of tunes" that continues Goulding's success with "catchy pop tunes". The singer, who described the album as her "least personal" album to date, draws influence from singers such as Kylie Minogue, Madonna, Sophie Ellis-Bextor, and Janet Jackson. Regarding the album's creative process, Goulding noted that "there really weren't any rules" and they "weren't trying to make a cohesive body of work", citing a mix of '80s influences including the Weeknd, Dolly Parton, and ABBA. In Higher Than Heaven, the music weds "sweet lyricism with glossy, shiny dance-floor bangers", which creates an album that resembles a "playlist of Millennial dance music", according to Piatkowski. Yeung wrote that it focuses on "pure thrills and escapism" in the same manner as pop songs written by Dua Lipa, Kylie Minogue and Ava Max during the COVID-19 lockdowns. In addition, the album incorporates elements of 1980s-inspired synthpop, alongside influences from house-pop, R&B, and "1990s-era diva pop"; the production was described by Piatkowski as having "an unfailing eye for catchy hooks and hummable lyrics".

=== Music and lyrics ===
"Midnight Dreams"
The opening track "Midnight Dreams" is a disco song which blends elements of 1980s pop and 1990s house.

"Waiting for It"
"Waiting for It" contrasts with Goulding's insistence to "fuck the world away", which highlights the track's dance-floor appeal.

The opener "Midnight Dreams" is a disco track that draws upon influences from '80s pop and '90s house, teaming "aqueous disco synths" with a "propulsive, funky bassline", according to Liam Hess of Vogue. Hess noted that "Cure for Love" features "swooping disco strings" over a "four-to-the-floor thump" and "stacked layers of Goulding's fluttering, powdered-sugar vocals". According to The Line of Best Fit's Sam Franzini, its chorus contains a "playful and catchy" elements that sings of "self-preservation after a breakup". "By the End of the Night" is an dance-pop song; Neil Z. Yeung of AllMusic described it as balancing Goulding's contrasting moods, calling it a "yearning yet uncertain early peak on the album". Clash editor Robin Murray described it as "chiming" and "80s-tastic", which serves as a "lush entry point" to the album. Conversely, the "near-monotone delivery" on the chorus is noted by Franzini as not pairing well with ideas that sound plucked straight out of 2015. Murray described "Like a Saviour" as a "bona fide anthem", highlighting its camp and entertaining pop style. Franzini noted its bass, describing it as "nasty and propulsive" and comparable to the style of the Weeknd. Yeung described "Love Goes On" as a "hazy" track that features "warm R&B smoothness"; it was noted by Murray for illustrating Goulding's "impressive chops". "Easy Lover", featuring Big Sean, is a "synthy, dance-pop" and "galactic dance anthem". Fittingly noted for "reaching new heights vocally" by Franzini, the title track is also noted for its shimmering sound and its influences from disco, 1980s pop, and 1990s house. NME's Nick Levine described "Let It Die" as an "evocative snapshot of a toxic relationship", dipping into "Dua Lipa's nu-disco territory". "Waiting for It" further explores a slow jam–influenced sound, noted by Murray for slightly dropping the tempo, offering a "spartan template" against "raw vocals". On the track, Goulding delivers a similarly compelling performance, singing the line "We can fuck the world away" in a "matter-of-fact" tone.

"How Long" features trap elements, while "Temptation" is highlighted by Murray for its "old-school disco thrills". Hess noted the latter's "Janet Jackson-esque orchestra hits", which contribute to an "oh-so-'80s" feel. According to Murray, "Intuition" features a "chugging Pet Shop Boys esque chorus", and "Better Man" was described by Hess as a "fullest expression" of the confidence that Goulding had developed in past years.

== Release and promotion ==
=== Marketing and singles ===
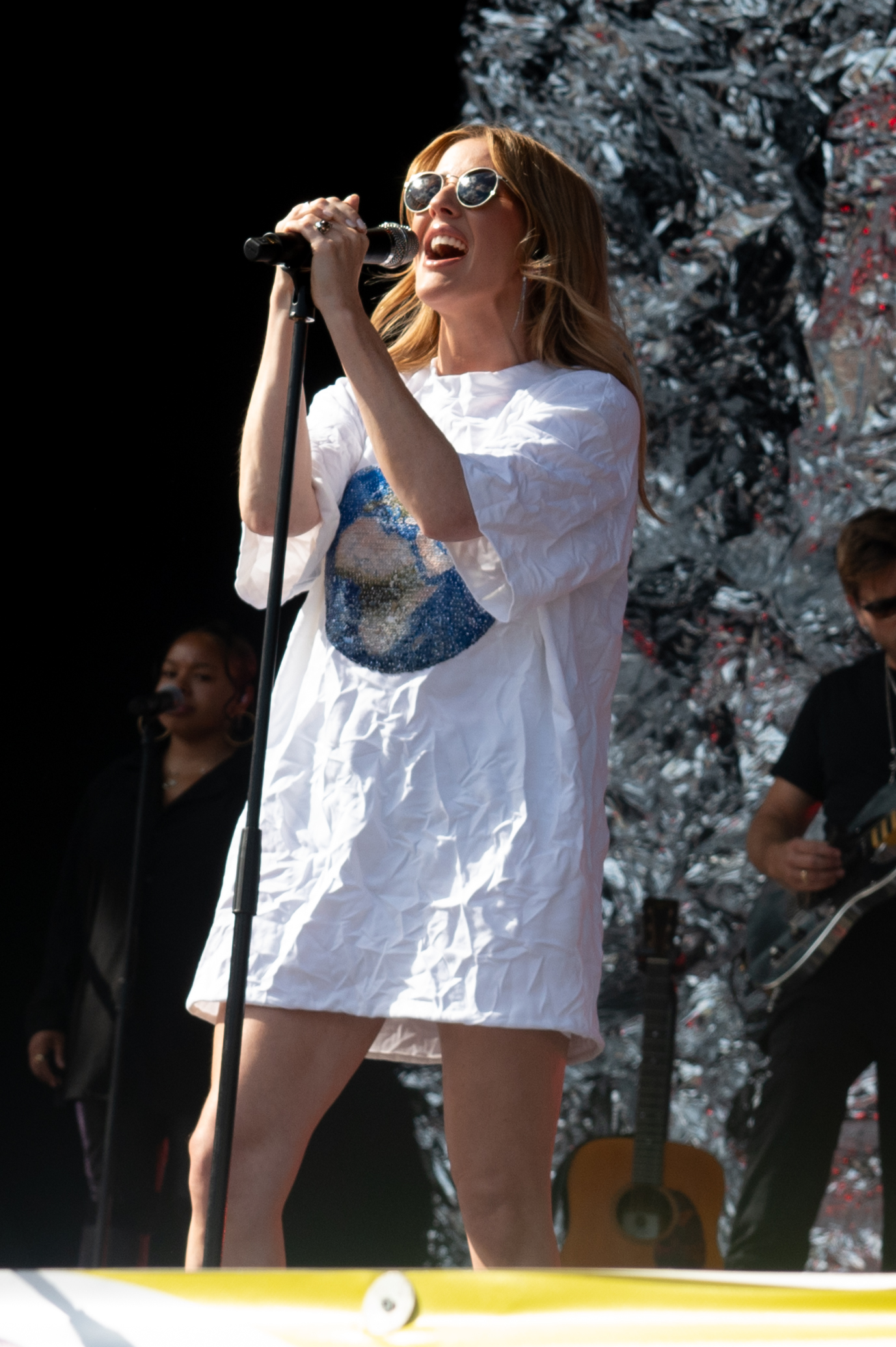
Goulding in 2023

Higher Than Heaven's first single, "Easy Lover" featuring Big Sean, was released on 15 July 2022. On 19 October, Goulding announced the album's title and revealed its cover artwork, with an initial release date of 3 February 2023. Same day, "Let It Die" was released as the second single, alongside Carlota Guerrero-directed music video. She promoted "Easy Lover" and discussed fan expectations for the project in an interview with Billboard News. However, on 9 January 2023, Goulding announced an initial delay to 24 March, stating: "We've had some exciting opportunities appear behind the scenes." At the same time, it was confirmed that a then-new single titled "Like a Saviour" would be released as of 10 January. On 28 February, she announced a second delay of the album to 7 April, stating issues with sourcing eco-friendly material for the album's physical formats.

On 30 January 2023, Goulding teased a next single, titled "Like a Saviour", releasing it on the day after of the announcement. Its music video was directed by Joe Connor, featuring choreography arranged by Daniel Alwell. "By the End of the Night" was chosen as the last single from the album, released on 22 March. On 31 March, Goulding released the songs "Midnight Dreams", "Cure for Love", "Love Goes On", and "Higher Than Heaven" on digital platforms in conjunction with her appearance on the Amazon Freevee concert film Monumental: Ellie Goulding at Kew Gardens. She also uploaded a visualiser for "Midnight Dreams" on 4 April. Three days later, the day of the album's release, Goulding released a music video for "Better Man", directed by Tom Sandford.

=== Tour ===
Higher Than Heaven
- Tour by Ellie Goulding
- Location: Europe
- Associated album: Higher Than Heaven
- Start date: 16 October 2023
- End date: 7 November 2023
- Legs: 1
- No. of shows: 12
- Supporting act: Olivia Lunny

Ellie Goulding concert chronology
- Brightest Blue Tour (2021); Higher Than Heaven Tour (2023)

In support of the album, Goulding announced European dates for the Higher Than Heaven Tour, supported by Canadian singer Olivia Lunny. The tour, scheduled to run throughout the autumn, included major shows across the United Kingdom and mainland Europe. UK stops included cities such as Glasgow, Manchester, and Birmingham, culminating in a headline performance at the Roundhouse in London, while Mainland European stops included Paris, Brussels, Milan, Cologne, and Berlin.

Before the main tour, Goulding also held an intimate, sold-out promotional show at Pryzm in Kingston Upon Thames in May. She also announced shows in the United States, accompanied by an orchestra.

== Critical reception ==
Professional ratings
Aggregate scores
Source	Rating
AnyDecentMusic?	6.7/10
Metacritic	77/100
Review scores
Source	Rating
AllMusic	4/5 stars
Clash	7/10
The Daily Telegraph	4/5 stars
Evening Standard	4/5 stars
The i Paper	4/5 stars
The Line of Best Fit	7/10
MusicOMH	3/5 stars
NME	4/5 stars
PopMatters	7/10
The Times	4/5 stars

Higher Than Heaven received generally favourable reviews from music critics. At Metacritic, which assigns a normalised rating out of 100 to reviews from professional critics, the album received a weighted average score of 77, based on seven reviews. Aggregator AnyDecentMusic? gave the album a 6.7 out of 10, based on their assessment of the critical consensus.

Neil Z. Yeung of AllMusic described Higher Than Heaven as one of Goulding's "least personal" but also one of her most immediate, focusing on euphoric dance-pop escapism rather than introspection. Clash's Robin Murray praised it as a simple, fun pop album that prioritises entertainment over discourse. Writing for The Daily Telegraph, Neil McCormick wrote that the album's mood aligns with the no-nonsense priorities of "Miracle", consisting of 11 tracks of nu-disco, '80s-inspired synth pop and sleek electronic dance music produced with hitmakers such as Stephen Kozmeniuk, Greg Kurstin and Andrew Wells. The Evening Standard reviewer David Smyth noted Goulding's intent to reactivate her hitmaking streak, highlighting the abundance of catchy, euphoric tracks. Sam Franzini of The Line of Best Fit compared the project to Ava Max's Diamonds & Dancefloors (2023), calling it a non-stop collection of shimmering synths and energetic vocals with standout moments such as "Love Goes On". Additionally, Franzini declared that Goulding was "successfully recalibrated" with Higher Than Heaven, describing it as "a fun, high-energy dance record" and a welcome contrast to how "Brightest Blue tried to be too smart and walked away with a noticeable lack of exciting songs".

The Arts Desk author Green Thomas H. described Higher Than Heaven's lyrics as "generic and forgettable" and suggesting the album aimed for a sound "midway between Beyoncé's Renaissance and Dua Lipa's Future Nostalgia". While "Let It Die" and "Waiting for It" were noted as relative highlights, the reviewer concluded that these moments were "not enough to raise overall interest levels". NME's Nick Levine highlighted Goulding's admission that it is her "least personal" work, but commended her ability to craft slick and stylish pop bangers despite some weaker lyrics. PopMatters called the album a thoroughly enjoyable, stylish set of dance-pop songs in the vein of Kylie Minogue and Madonna, designed for pure entertainment. Ed Potton of The Times deemed it a polished collection of escapist, post-lockdown dance-pop tracks that sound excellent in the moment, even if their long-term impact is uncertain. Giving a rating of 4 stars out of 5, Kate Solomon from The i Paper wrote the album "couldn't care less what's going on in your soul. It just wants you to order another vodka tonic and slosh it down yourself on the way back to the dancefloor. And who are we to argue with that?"

Katie Bain from Billboard listed the album in her list of the 50 Best Albums of 2023, praising Goulding decision of "trading straightforward confessions for slick, textural dance pop and lyrical sweet nothings about dim lights and easy lovers", stating that Goulding "delivered one of her best (and most club-friendly) albums to date". As well dubbing Goulding as "one of the defining voices of dance music over the last decade". Tomás Mier from Rolling Stone named Higher Than Heaven as one of the best albums of the year, praising Goulding decision of making a "fun, escapist pop" record that "remind listeners of Goulding's pop prowess", instead of going into an introspective route like most of her peers did in recent years.

=== Rankings ===
List of critics' rankings
Publication	Accolade	Rank	Ref.
AllMusic	The Best Pop Albums of 2023	Listed	
Rolling Stone	The Best Albums of 2023 So Far	Listed	
Pop Passion	10 Best Pop Albums of 2023	10	
Billboard	The 50 Best Albums of 2023 So Far: Staff Picks	Listed	

== Commercial performance ==
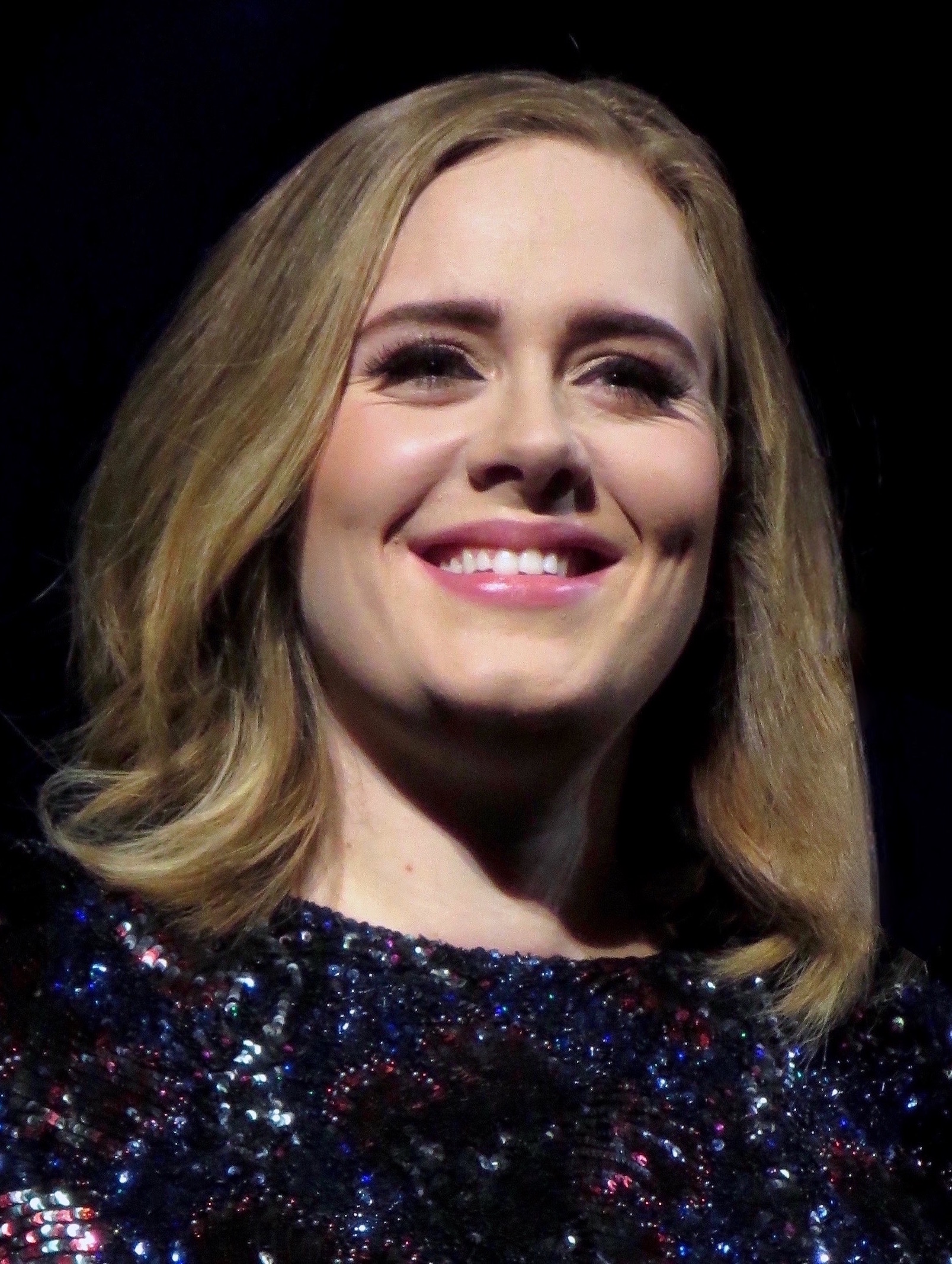
Goulding achieved her fourth number one album in the UK, tying Adele (pictured) as the two British female artists with the most chart-topping albums.

In the United Kingdom, Higher Than Heaven debuted at number one on the UK Albums Chart, shifting 11,818 album-equivalent units in its first week. It became Goulding's fourth chart-topping album in the country, tying with Adele as the two British female artists with the most UK number one albums. In the same week, her collaboration single with Calvin Harris, "Miracle", reached number one on the UK Singles Chart; it earned Goulding her first "chart double", although it is not featured in the album. It represented the first occasion on which she led both the albums and singles charts at the same time. In the second week, the album dropped from number one to number 84 making it one of the few number-one albums to spend only one week in the top 75.

In Scotland, Higher Than Heaven debuted at number one on the Scottish Albums Chart, becoming her second chart-topper, and first since her second album Halcyon (2012). Meanwhile, in Ireland, the record peaked at number 97 on the Irish Album Chart. In the United States, Higher Than Heaven debuted at number 125 on the Billboard 200.

== Track listing ==
Standard edition
No.	Title	Writer(s)	Producer(s)	Length
1.	"Midnight Dreams"	Ellie Goulding; Trey Campbell; Glen Garth; Phil Garth; Stephen Kozmeniuk	Koz; The 23rd	3:12
2.	"Cure for Love"	Goulding; Tom Mann; Anthony Rossomando; Andrew Wells	Wells; Koz^{[p]}	2:57
3.	"By the End of the Night"	Goulding; Campbell; Kozmeniuk	Koz	3:08
4.	"Like a Saviour"	Goulding; Mann; Rossomando; Wells	Wells; Koz^{[p]}	3:40
5.	"Love Goes On"	Goulding; Greg Kurstin	Kurstin	3:52
6.	"Easy Lover" (featuring Big Sean)	Goulding; Sean Anderson; Kurstin; Julia Michaels	Kurstin	3:35
7.	"Higher Than Heaven"	Goulding; Campbell; G. Garth; P. Garth; Kozmeniuk	Koz; The 23rd	3:29
8.	"Let It Die"	Goulding; Mann; Andrea Rocha; Peter Rycroft	Lostboy	2:46
9.	"Waiting for It"	Goulding; Maureen McDonald; Jesse Shatkin	Shatkin	3:19
10.	"Just for You"	Goulding; Kurstin; Michaels	Kurstin	3:06
11.	"How Long"	Ali Tamposi; Brian Lee; Nathan Perez; Andrew Watt	Watt; Happy Perez	3:38
Total length:				36:42

Deluxe edition
No.	Title	Writer(s)	Producer(s)	Length
12.	"Temptation"	Goulding; Mann; Rossomando; Wells	Wells	3:03
13.	"Intuition"	Goulding; Kurstin	Kurstin	3:12
14.	"Tastes Like You"	Goulding; Mann; Rossomando; Wells	Wells	3:12
15.	"Better Man"	Goulding; Jussifer; Tayla Parx; Jack Patterson	Parisi; Sam Skirrow^{[a]}	2:52
16.	"All by Myself" (with Alok and Sigala)	Goulding; Martin Gore; Mann; OHYES; Alok Achkar Peres Petrillo; Rossomando; Wells	Alok; OHYES; Sigala; Wells	2:52
Total length:				51:53

=== Notes ===
- ^{^[p]} signifies a primary and vocal producer.
- ^{^[a]} signifies an additional producer.

== Credits and personnel ==
Credits were adapted from the liner notes.

=== Locations and management ===
- Clean Bandit Studios; London (vocals recording: track 15)
- Published by Concod Boulevard (ASCAP) / Ancient Door Publishing, Warner-Tamerlane Publishing Corp (BMI) / Futurekind Limited / Sony Music Publishing - BMI / Universal Music Publishing / Warner Chappell UK
- Mastered at Sterling Sound Studios; New York City (1–15) and One Mix Mastering (16)

=== Musicians ===
- Ellie Goulding – vocals
- Glen Garth – background vocals (tracks 1, 7); bass guitar, drums, synthesiser (7)
- Phil Garth – background vocals (1, 3); bass guitar, drums, synthesiser (1)
- Stephen Kozmeniuk – bass guitar, drums, synthesiser (1–4, 7); guitar (1–4)
- Maurie Kaufmann – drums (1, 7)
- Andrew Wells – bass guitar, drums, guitar, synthesiser (2, 4, 12, 14); piano (2, 4), flute (4), percussion (12, 14), programming (14), keyboards (16)
- Claude Vause – programming (2)
- Todd Clark – background vocals (3)
- Trey Campbell – background vocals (3)
- Greg Kurstin – bass guitar, drums, keyboards, percussion, synthesiser (5, 6, 10, 13); electric guitar (6, 10)
- Lostboy – bass guitar, drum programming, keyboards, programming (8)
- Big Sean – vocals (6)
- Jesse Shatkin – bass guitar, drums, keyboards, percussion, programming, synthesiser (9)
- Andrew Watt – acoustic guitar, electric guitar, keyboards, programming (11)
- Happy Perez – keyboards, programming (11)
- Freddy Sheed – drum programming (12)
- Charley Bagnall – synthesiser (12)
- Marco Parisi – bass guitar, keyboards, programming, sound effects (15)
- Giampaolo Parisi – drums, percussion, programming, sound effects, synthesiser (15)
- Ohyes – bass guitar, drums, keyboards, programming (16)
- João Cruz – guitar (16)
- Bruce Fielder – keyboards, programming (16)

=== Technical ===
- Randy Merrill – mastering (1–15)
- One Mix Mastering – mastering, mixing (16)
- Matty Green – mixing (1, 7, 9, 14)
- Serban Ghenea – mixing (2–6, 10–13)
- Lostboy – mixing (8)
- Clem Cherry – engineering (1, 3, 7)
- Jesper Kragh Nielsen – engineering (1, 3, 7)
- Kristian Donaldson – engineering (1, 3, 7)
- Andrew Wells – engineering (2, 4, 12)
- Alex Pasco – engineering (5, 6, 10, 13)
- Greg Kurstin – engineering (5, 6, 10, 13)
- Julian Burg – engineering (5, 6, 10, 13)
- Matt Tuggle – engineering (5, 6, 10, 13)
- Tom Kahre – engineering (6)
- Jesse Shatkin – engineering (9)
- Samuel Dent – engineering (9)
- Andrew Watt – engineering (11)
- Happy Perez – engineering (11)
- Joe Kearns – vocal engineering (6)
- Bryce Bordone – mixing assistance (2–6, 10–13)
- Claude Vause – engineering assistance (2, 4, 12)
- Jon Yeston – engineering assistance (2, 4, 12)
- Dominic Ganderton – engineering assistance (2, 4)
- Luke Gibbs – engineering assistance (12, 14)

== Charts ==
Weekly chart performance
Chart (2023)	Peak position
Australian Digital Albums (ARIA)	15
Australian Physical Albums (ARIA)	38
Austrian Albums (Ö3 Austria)	52
Belgian Albums (Ultratop Flanders)	5
Belgian Albums (Ultratop Wallonia)	37
Dutch Albums (Album Top 100)	37
French Albums (SNEP)	86
German Albums (Offizielle Top 100)	20
Irish Albums (IRMA)	97
Polish Albums (ZPAV)	47
Scottish Albums (Official Charts)	1
Spanish Albums (Promusicae)	99
Swiss Albums (Schweizer Hitparade)	28
UK Albums (Official Charts)	1
US Billboard 200	125

== Release history ==
List of release dates and formats
Region	Date	Format(s)	Edition(s)	Label	Ref.
Various	7 April 2023	Cassette; CD; digital download; streaming; vinyl	Standard	Polydor	
Various	7 April 2023	CD; digital download; streaming	Deluxe	Polydor	
