= Master Peace =

English music artist

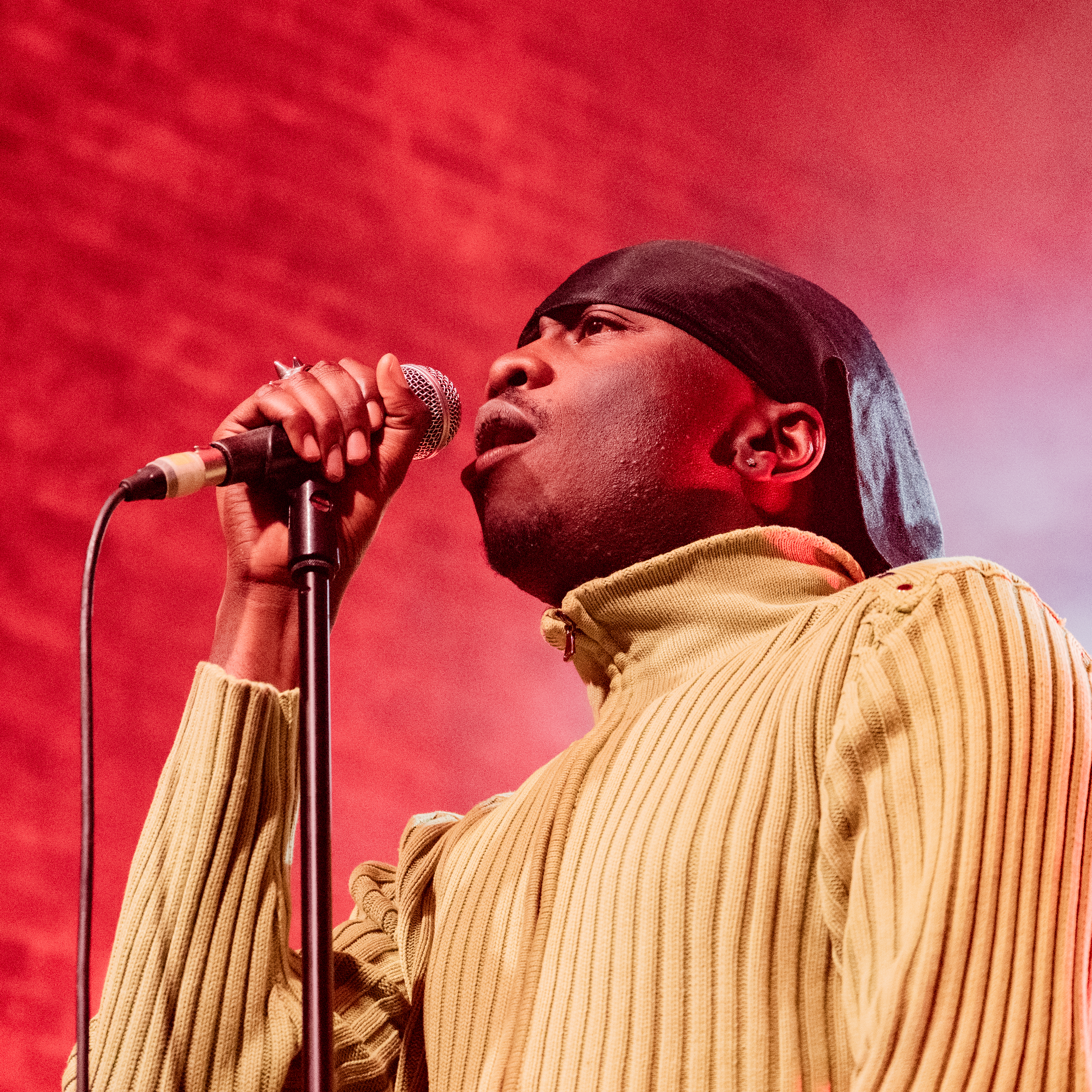
- At Village Underground, SXSW London, June 2026

Background information
- Born: Peace Okezie London, England
- Genres: Indie sleaze; indie rock; indie pop; punk rock; post-punk revival; dance-punk; nu rave; indie dance
- Occupation: Singer
- Years active: 2018–present
- Label: PMR
- Website: www.masterpeaceofficial.com

Peace Okezie, known as Master Peace, is a British musician. Initially collaborating with Jme and the Streets and releasing three EPs, in 2024 he released his debut album How to Make a Master Peace which received high praise from critics and won him a Rising Star Ivor Novello Award. He followed this with a fourth EP How to Make A(nuva) Master Peace.

== Early life ==
Okezie was born in London, to a Nigerian family, and moved from South East London as a child to Morden, and then to Surrey where he grew up. Having said that he "grew up around people involved in crime", he has also noted that he went to "quite a posh school".

He had a childhood interest in UK rap, but has also stated that his favourite song growing up was "Don’t Speak" by No Doubt; he often listened to rap with friends and played music by indie rock bands such as Arctic Monkeys and Bloc Party at home. Okezie was first inspired to become a musician after seeing the bands Busted and McFly on television.

== Career ==
=== 2018–2023: Early career and EPs ===
Okezie initially was part of a rap group, which he left before it became successful. In 2018, Okezie released "The Lift", which involved him rapping over a-ha’s "Take On Me". On a BBC Radio 1Xtra session, he was noted for singing "Twinkle, Twinkle, Little Star". In 2019 he released "Night Time", which featured Jme. The song was praised by Skepta.

His debut EP Love Bites was released 6 November 2020, largely inspired by his childhood; NME called it "unfiltered". Public Display Of Affection, his second EP, was released 2 July 2021. Its track "Boyfriend", featuring Mae Muller, was released alongside a music video. The Streets released a single featuring Okezie, "Wrong Answers Only", on 14 January 2022. He was due to support the group on a 2022 tour which was cancelled due to the COVID-19 pandemic. In January 2023, Okezie released "Veronica", about young love, in the run-up to his EP Peace Of Mind.

=== 2024–2025: How To Make A Master Peace and A(nuva) Master Peace ===
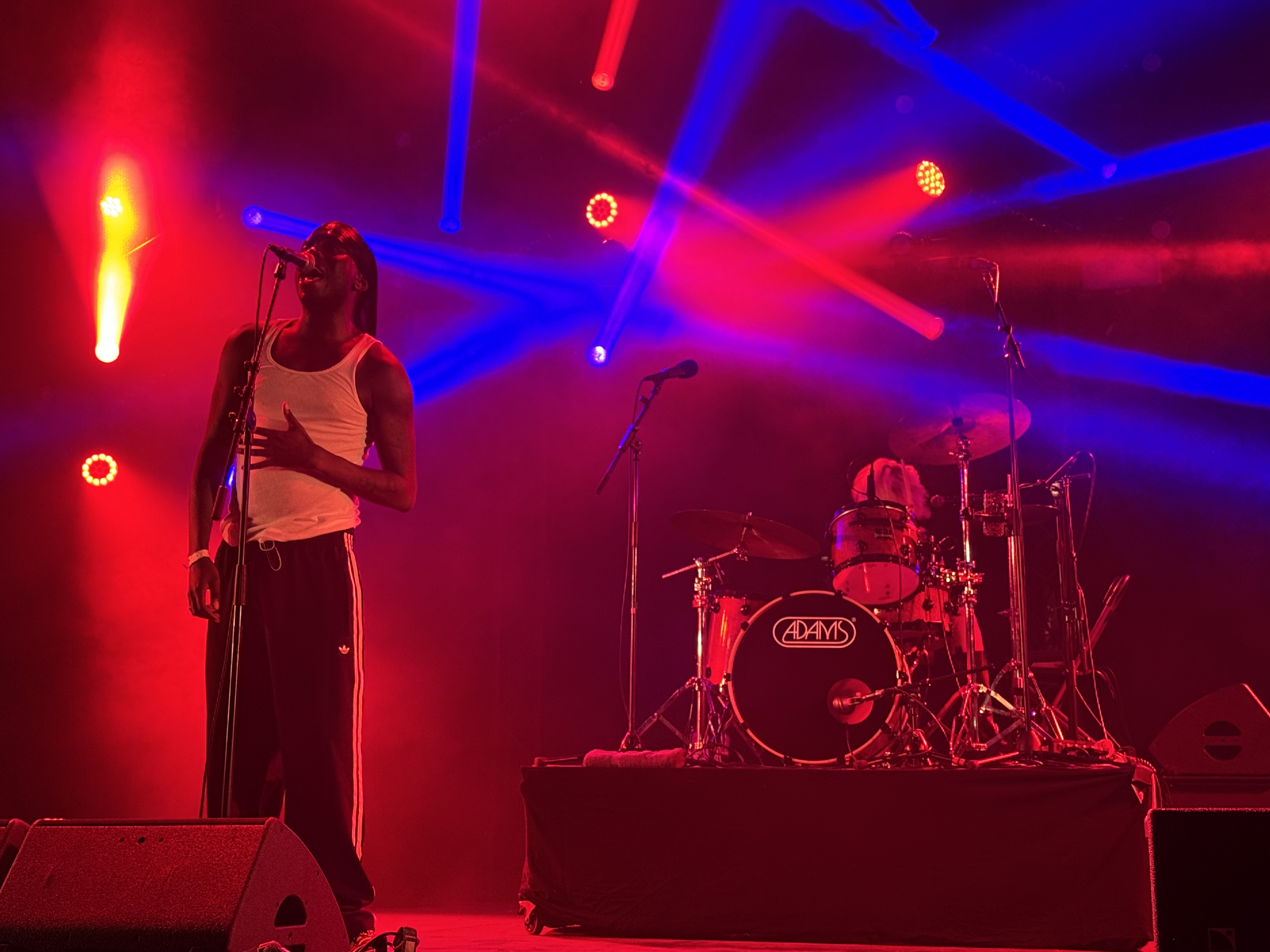
Master Peace performing with drummer Hattie Steel at Valkhof Festival in Nijmegen, the Netherlands in 2025

On 1 March 2024, Okezie released his debut album, How To Make A Master Peace, stating that he wanted the album to be a "cultural reset for Gen Z kids of the current day and age". He worked with producers Julian Brunetta and Matt Schwartz on the album, which featured Georgia on the song "I Might Be Fake", one of multiple singles which also included "LOO SONG", "Start You Up" and "LOS NARCOS", the latter of which Okezie stated was "probably the best song I’ve ever made." The music video for "I Might Be Fake" was later nominated for Best Independent Video at the AIM Independent Music Awards 2024. Rolling Stone UK stated that Okezie was "leading the way for a new generation of indie stars" with the album, comparing it to Bloc Party, LCD Soundsystem, the Rapture, Pete Doherty, M.I.A. and the Smiths, later listing it as one of the 24 best albums of 2024, whereas NME compared specific songs to the Hives, also stating it was "an early contender for the best British debut album of 2024".

A remix of "I Might Be Fake" with Princess Superstar, titled "I Might Be Fake-Arrr", was released in March 2024. In May Okezie won the Ivor Novello Award for Rising Star, and stated that he was working on a deluxe version of How To Make A Master Peace to be followed by a second album, which would be "sleazier" and "poppier". He performed "Wrong Answers Only" with The Streets at Glastonbury Festival 2024.

Okezie released the single "Home" featuring Wale in July 2024, and announced his second EP How To Make A(nuva) Master Peace. In August, Okezie released his single "Save Me", and singer TSHA released her single "Can't Dance" which featured Okezie. His 9 September single "Dancing With A(nuva) Man" was called "one of his poppiest offerings yet" by DIY, and his final single for the EP, "This Time", was released 2 October. How To Make A(nuva) Master Peace released on 4 October through PMR Records. Following the EP, he embarked on a European tour called How To Make A World Tour. At the Rolling Stone UK Awards in November, Okezie was nominated for the Play Next Award, for acts they believed would "enter 2025 as firm ones to watch."

He performed at South by Southwest in March 2025, and supported Franz Ferdinand on the band's 2025 U.K. and U.S. tours. Okezie performed the song "Hooked" live on stage with Franz Ferdinand at Barrowland in Glasgow, a performance that was subsequently released on a single.

In January 2026, he released the single "Fuck It Up", a collaboration featuring Declan McKenna, with Okezie saying the song is about “me embracing my flaws and wanting to let kids know they don’t need to feel ashamed or embarrassed about messing up and that we’re all in it together. We’re all fuck-ups in one way or another. This idea that everyone has to be perfect, that we’re not allowed to grow and learn, just isn’t human to me."

== Artistry ==
Okezie has cited M.I.A., Blood Orange, Santigold, the Strokes, LCD Soundsystem, Bloc Party, Arctic Monkeys, Bodyrox, Princess Superstar, Friendly Fires, Justice, early Calvin Harris, the Veronicas, Paramore, Fleetwood Mac, Nirvana, the Notorious B.I.G., and Big L as influences.

== Personal life ==
Okezie suffers from peripheral neuropathy, which causes nerve pain, frailty, and numbness in his limbs. He also has attention deficit hyperactivity disorder.

== Discography ==
=== Albums ===
- How to Make a Master Peace (2024)
- If I Don't Love You, Who Will? (2026)

=== Extended plays ===
- Love Bites (2020)
- Public Display Of Affection (2021)
- Peace of Mind (2023)
- How to Make a(nuva) Master Peace (2024)
- Stupid Kids (2026)

=== Singles ===
- "The Lift" (2018)
- "Buck Me" (2018)
- "Night Time" (2019)
- "Veronica" (2023)
- ""LOO SONG" (2023)
- "I Might Be Fake" (2023)
- "Start You Up" (2023)
- "LOS NARCOS" (2023)
- "Home" (feat. Wale, 2024)
- "I Might Be Fake-Arrr" (2024)
- "Save Me" (2024)
- "Dancing with a(nuva) Man" (2024)
- "This Time" (2024)
- "Harley" (2025)
- "Shake Me Down" (2025)
- "There's No More Underground" (2025)
- "Spin the Block" (2025)
- "Good Times" (2025)
- "Fuck It Up" (feat. Declan McKenna, 2026)
- "Love Hate" (feat. Thomas Day, 2026)
- "One of One" (2026)
- "Sucker Punch !" (2026)
