= TSHA (musician) =

English DJ and producer (born 1991)

- Born: Teisha Matthews; 26 December 1991 (age 34)
- Origin: Fareham, England
- Genres: Electronic; house
- Occupations: DJ; producer; singer; songwriter; multi-instrumentalist
- Years active: 2018–present
- Label: Ninja Tune
- Website: tshamusic.com

Teisha Matthews (born 26 December 1991), known professionally as TSHA, is a British DJ and record producer, born and raised in Fareham. Her music has earned well over 180 million streams across all platforms, earning her accolades such as becoming a DC-10 resident, delivering a BBC Essential Mix, nominations for the MOBO's (Best Dance Act). Her debut album, Capricorn Sun, was named Album of the Year by DJ Mag and BBC R1 Dance.

== Discography ==
=== Studio albums ===
- Capricorn Sun (2022)
- Sad Girl (2024)

=== Compilation albums ===
- Fabric Presents TSHA (2022)

=== EPs ===
- Dawn (2018)
- Moonlight (2019)
- Flowers (2020)
- OnlyL (2021)

=== Singles ===
List of singles, with selected chart positions, certifications, and album name
Title	Year	Peak chart positions					Album
Title	Year	UK				BE	Album
Title	Year	Physical	Vinyl	Single Downloads	Single Sales	BE	Album
"Sacred"	2018	—	—	—	—	—	Non-album single
"Moon"	2019	—	—	—	—	—	Moonlight
"Me You"	2019	—	—	—	—	—	Moonlight
"Sister"	2020	—	—	—	—	—	Flowers
"Change" (with Gabrielle Aplin)	2020	—	—	—	—	—	Flowers
"Demba" (with Trio Da Kali)	2020	—	—	—	—	—	Flowers
"OnlyL" (with NIMMO)	2021	18	15	—	—	—	Capricorn Sun
"Power"	2021	—	—	—	—	—	Capricorn Sun
"BOYZ"	2022	—	—	—	—	—	fabric presents TSHA
"Giving Up" (with MAFRO)	2022	—	—	—	—	—	Capricorn Sun
"Let You Go" (with Diplo and Kareen Lomax)	2022	—	—	93	95	—	Diplo
"Water" (with Oumou Sangaré)	2022	—	—	—	—	—	Capricorn Sun
"Dancing In The Shadows" (with Clementine Douglas)	2022	—	—	100	—	—	Capricorn Sun
"Running"	2022	—	—	—	—	—	Capricorn Sun
"Killing Me" (with Aluna)	2023	—	—	—	—	—	Non-album singles
"Somebody" (with Ellie Goulding and Gregory Porter)	2023	—	—	—	—	8	Non-album singles
"Sweet Devotion" (with Caroline Byrne)	2024	—	—	—	—	—	Sad Girl
"Girls" (with Rose Gray)	2024	—	—	—	—	—	Sad Girl
"Drive" (with Ingrid Witt)	2024	—	—	—	—	—	Sad Girl
"Can't Dance" (with Master Peace)	2024	—	—	—	—	—	Sad Girl
"Green"	2024	—	—	—	—	—	Sad Girl
"—" denotes a recording that did not chart or was not released in that territory.

=== Remixes ===
List of songs remixed by TSHA
Artist(s)	Title	Year	Album
Lianne La Havas	"Can't Fight"	2020	Non-album singles
Millie Turner	"January"	2020	Non-album singles
Zola Blood	"Out of Time"	2020	Two Hearts Remix - EP
Griff	"Say It Again"	2020	Non-album single
Silk City, Ellie Goulding	"New Love"	2021	New Love.. - EP
Model Man, Hamzaa	"Don't Cry"	2021	Non-album single
J Balvin, Skrillex	"In da Getto"	2021	JOSE (Deluxe Edition)
KUU, Alex Metric, Riton, Shungudzo	"We'll Always Have This Dance"	2022	Non-album singles
MAFRO, Eli Murphy	"Bloom"	2023	Non-album singles
Johnny Corporate	"Sunday Shoutin′"	2024	Non-album singles
