= Easy Lover (Ellie Goulding song) =

2022 single by Ellie Goulding

Single by Ellie Goulding featuring Big Sean

from the album Higher Than Heaven
- Written: 2016–2022
- Released: 15 July 2022
- Recorded: 2022
- Genre: R&B
- Length: 3:35
- Label: Polydor
- Songwriters: Ellie Goulding; Sean Anderson; Greg Kurstin; Julia Michaels
- Producer: Greg Kurstin

Ellie Goulding singles chronology
"New Love" (2021)	"Easy Lover" (2022)	"All by Myself" (2022)

Big Sean singles chronology
"Hate Our Love" (2022)	"Easy Lover" (2022)

Music video
- "Easy Lover" on YouTube

"Easy Lover" is a song by English singer-songwriter Ellie Goulding featuring American rapper Big Sean. It was released on 15 July 2022, through Polydor Records as the lead single from her fifth studio album, Higher Than Heaven (2023). It was written by Goulding, Sean, Greg Kurstin and Julia Michaels, and produced by Kurstin.

== Background and release ==
In January 2022, Goulding hinted at releasing new music in an Instagram post and expressed concerns about having to manage her mental wellbeing. In July, she sent an email to her fans "that the song was a long time coming and that it had had many lives". In an interview with Billboard, she detailed the process behind working with Kurstin and Michaels for the song, saying: "I think one of us was dealing with a known f–kboy at the time, but we ended up with a song about going back to the same person who’s hurt you and you think you can change them. We always say we can change someone, and we can't".

Regarding the collaboration process with Big Sean on the record, she added: "We’ve stayed in touch for years because he sampled me a couple of times, I always feel like there’s something pretty special in someone who appreciates me that early on as an artist, so I’ve stayed in touch with everyone from that era, in particular him because I think’s he’s consistently been a brilliant artist. At some point we were going to do a collab, and it just happened to be this song". "Easy Lover" was released on 25 July via Polydor Records, while a solo version of the song was later released on 26 August.

== Music video ==
The music video, directed by Sophia Ray, was shot in a school in Bulgaria. Goulding plays several characters, including a teacher and an androgynous rocker, to take on an otherworldly creature. Sean makes an appearance in a scene as Goulding plays a teacher who is taking class photos.

In an interview with Rolling Stone UK, Goulding stated: "I was really nervous that the video would just end up being a representation of the song. But I wanted it to be something else. I wanted it to be a bit trippy, like we’re living in some kind of parallel universe, or we’re all in some kind of simulation, like a video game". She added that she wanted to allude to characters that might return later in the campaign.

== Reception ==
"Easy Lover" has received generally positive reviews from critics. Alex Gonzalez from Uproxx praised Sean's verse, describing it as "clever wordplay", and Mike DeWald from RIFF Magazine enthused about an "anthemic feeling" in the song.

== Track listing ==
Digital download / streaming

1. "Easy Lover" (featuring Big Sean) – 3:35

Digital download / streaming – Four Tet Remix

1. "Easy Lover" (Four Tet Remix) – 4:11

Digital download / streaming – Solo Version

1. "Easy Lover" (Solo Version) – 3:25

Digital download / streaming – Jax Jones Remix

1. "Easy Lover" (Jax Jones Remix) – 2:00

Digital download / streaming – The Remixes

1. "Easy Lover" (featuring Big Sean; Navos Remix) – 2:44
2. "Easy Lover" (Russ Chimes Remix) – 3:35
3. "Easy Lover" (featuring Big Sean; Colbath Remix) – 3:35

== Personnel ==
Credits were adapted from Tidal.

- Ellie Goulding – lead vocals, songwriter, composer, lyricist
- Big Sean – lead vocals, songwriter, composer, lyricist
- Greg Kurstin – producer, songwriter, composer, lyricist, bass, drums, electric guitar, keyboards, percussion, synthesizer
- Julia Michaels – composer, songwriter, lyricist
- Bryce Bordone – assistant mixing engineer
- Joe Kearns – vocal engineer
- Randy Merrill – mastering engineer
- Tom Kahre – engineer
- Matt Tuggle – engineer
- Alex Pasco – engineer
- Julian Burg – engineer
- Serban Ghenea – mixing

== Charts ==
Chart performance for "Easy Lover"
Chart (2022)	Peak position
Canada CHR/Top 40 (Billboard)	40
Croatia International Airplay (Top lista)	26
Czech Republic Airplay (ČNS IFPI)	23
Finland Airplay (Radiosoittolista)	11
Japan Hot Overseas (Billboard Japan)	20
New Zealand Hot Singles (RMNZ)	27
Slovakia Airplay (ČNS IFPI)	88
Suriname (Nationale Top 40)	26
UK Singles Downloads (Official Charts)	31
US Adult Pop Airplay (Billboard)	21
US Pop Airplay (Billboard)	29

== Release history ==
Release history and formats for "Easy Lover"
Region	Date	Format	Version	Label	Ref.
Various	15 July 2022	Digital download; streaming	Original	Polydor	
Various	19 August 2022	Digital download; streaming	Four Tet Remix	Polydor	
Various	26 August 2022	Digital download; streaming	Solo Version	Polydor	
Various	2 September 2022	Digital download; streaming	Jax Jones Remix	Polydor	
Various	23 September 2022	Digital download; streaming	The Remixes	Polydor	
