= List of artists who have achieved simultaneous number-one UK single and album =

A number of artists have achieved simultaneous number one singles and albums on The Official Charts Company from the United Kingdom (also the BPI).

== Simultaneous number-one singles and albums ==
=== 1960s ===
- Elvis Presley – "Are You Lonesome Tonight?" and G.I. Blues 22 January 1961 (four weeks)
- Elvis Presley – "Wooden Heart" and G.I. Blues 19 March 1961 (one week) and 2 April 1961 (four weeks)
- Elvis Presley – "Surrender" and G.I. Blues 1 June 1961 (four weeks)
- The Shadows – "Kon-Tiki" and The Shadows 8 October 1961 (one week)
- Cliff Richard – "The Young Ones" and The Young Ones 7 January 1962 (six weeks)
- Elvis Presley – "Can't Help Falling in Love" / "Rock-A-Hula Baby" and Blue Hawaii 18 February 1962 (four weeks)
- Elvis Presley – "Good Luck Charm" and Blue Hawaii 27 May 1962 (three weeks)
- The Shadows – "Dance On!" and Out of the Shadows 20 January 1963 (one week)
- Cliff Richard – "Summer Holiday" and Summer Holiday 10 March 1963 (two weeks) and 31 March 1963 (one week)
- The Beatles – "From Me to You" and Please Please Me 5 May 1963 (six weeks)
- The Beatles – "She Loves You" and Please Please Me 8 September 1963 (four weeks) and 24 November 1963 (one week)
- The Beatles – "She Loves You" and With the Beatles 1 December 1963 (one week)
- The Beatles – "I Want to Hold Your Hand" and With the Beatles 8 December 1963 (five weeks)
- The Beatles – "Can't Buy Me Love" and With the Beatles 29 March 1964 (three weeks)
- The Rolling Stones – "It's All Over Now" and The Rolling Stones 12 July 1964 (one week)
- The Beatles – "A Hard Day's Night" and A Hard Day's Night 19 July 1964 (three weeks)
- The Beatles – "I Feel Fine" and A Hard Day's Night 6 December 1964 (one week)
- The Beatles – "I Feel Fine" and Beatles for Sale 13 December 1964 (four weeks)
- The Rolling Stones – "The Last Time" and The Rolling Stones No. 2 14 March 1965 (three weeks)
- The Beatles – "Ticket to Ride" and Beatles for Sale 1 May 1965 (two weeks)
- The Beatles – "Help!" and Help! 8 August 1965 (two weeks)
- The Beatles – "Day Tripper" / "We Can Work It Out" and Rubber Soul 19 December 1965 (four weeks)
- The Rolling Stones – "Paint It Black" and Aftermath 22 May 1966 (one week)
- The Beatles – "Yellow Submarine" / "Eleanor Rigby" and Revolver 14 August 1966 (four weeks)
- The Monkees – "I'm a Believer" and The Monkees 4 February 1967 (two weeks)
- The Beatles – "All You Need is Love" and Sgt. Pepper's Lonely Hearts Club Band 16 July 1967 (three weeks)
- The Beatles – "Hello, Goodbye" and Sgt. Pepper's Lonely Hearts Club Band 17 December 1967 (two weeks)

=== 1970s ===
- Simon & Garfunkel – "Bridge over Troubled Water" and Bridge over Troubled Water 22 March 1970 (three weeks)
- George Harrison – "My Sweet Lord" and All Things Must Pass 31 January 1971 (four weeks)
- Rod Stewart – "Reason to Believe" / "Maggie May" and Every Picture Tells a Story 3 October 1971 (three weeks)
- T. Rex – "Telegram Sam" and Electric Warrior 30 January 1972 (two weeks)
- T. Rex – "Metal Guru" and Bolan Boogie 14 May 1972 (three weeks)
- The Stylistics – "Can't Give You Anything (But My Love)" and The Best of the Stylistics 10 August 1975 (two weeks)
- Rod Stewart – "Sailing" and Atlantic Crossing 31 August 1975 (four weeks)
- Queen – "Bohemian Rhapsody" and A Night at the Opera 21 December 1975 (two weeks) and 11 January 1976 (two weeks)
- ABBA – "Fernando" and Greatest Hits 2 May 1976 (four weeks)
- ABBA – "Knowing Me, Knowing You" and Arrival 10 April 1977 (three weeks)
- Elvis Presley – "Way Down" and Elvis' 40 Greatest 4 September 1977 (one week)
- ABBA – "Take a Chance on Me" and ABBA: The Album 12 February 1978 (three weeks)
- Blondie – "Heart of Glass" and Parallel Lines 11 February 1979 (two weeks)
- Tubeway Army – "Are 'Friends' Electric?" and Replicas 15 July 1979 (one week)
- Gary Numan – "Cars" and The Pleasure Principle 16 September 1979 (one week)
- The Police – "Message in a Bottle" and Reggatta de Blanc 10 October 1979 (one week)

=== 1980s ===
- Pretenders – "Brass in Pocket" and Pretenders 13 January 1980 (two weeks)
- The Police – "Don't Stand So Close to Me" and Zenyatta Mondatta 5 October 1980 (two weeks)
- Barbra Streisand – "Woman in Love" and Guilty 2 November 1980 (two weeks)
- ABBA – "Super Trouper" and Super Trouper 23 November 1980 (three weeks)
- John Lennon – "Woman" and Double Fantasy 1 February 1981 (two weeks)
- Adam and the Ants – "Stand and Deliver" and Kings of the Wild Frontier 3 May 1981 (two weeks)
- Queen – "Under Pressure" and Greatest Hits 15 November 1981 (two weeks)
- The Human League – "Don't You Want Me" and Dare 3 January 1982 (one week)
- Paul McCartney – "Ebony and Ivory" and Tug of War 2 May 1982 (one week)
- Madness – "House of Fun" and Complete Madness 23 May 1982 (one week)
- Men at Work – "Down Under" and Business as Usual 23 January 1983 (three weeks)
- Michael Jackson – "Billie Jean" and Thriller 27 February 1983 (one week)
- David Bowie – "Let's Dance" and Let's Dance 17 April 1983 (one week)
- Spandau Ballet – "True" and True 8 May 1983 (one week)
- The Police – "Every Breath You Take" and Synchronicity 19 June 1983 (one week)
- Culture Club – "Karma Chameleon" and Colour by Numbers 16 October 1983 (two weeks)
- Lionel Richie – "Hello" and Can't Slow Down 25 March 1984 (two weeks)
- Foreigner – "I Want to Know What Love Is" and Agent Provocateur 20 January 1985 (two weeks)
- Phil Collins – "Easy Lover" and No Jacket Required 17 March 1985 (two weeks)
- Madonna – "Papa Don't Preach" and True Blue 6 July 1986 (three weeks)
- Whitney Houston – "I Wanna Dance with Somebody (Who Loves Me)" and Whitney 7 June 1987 (one week)
- T'Pau – "China in Your Hand" and Bridge of Spies 15 November 1987 (one week)
- Cliff Richard – "Mistletoe and Wine" and Private Collection: 1979–1988 18 December 1988 (two weeks)
- Madonna – "Like a Prayer" and Like a Prayer 26 March 1989 (two weeks)
- Jason Donovan – "Sealed with a Kiss" and Ten Good Reasons 4 June 1989 (two weeks)
- Soul II Soul – "Back to Life (However Do You Want Me)" and Club Classics Vol. One 9 July 1989 (one week)

=== 1990s ===
- Bryan Adams – "(Everything I Do) I Do It for You" and Waking Up the Neighbours 29 September 1991 (one week)
- Michael Jackson – "Black or White" and Dangerous 24 November 1991 (one week)
- Queen – "Bohemian Rhapsody" / "These Are the Days of Our Lives" and Greatest Hits II 15 December 1991 (two weeks)
- Wet Wet Wet – "Goodnight Girl" and High on the Happy Side 2 February 1992 (two weeks)
- Right Said Fred – "Deeply Dippy" and Up 19 April 1992 (one week)
- Meat Loaf – "I'd Do Anything for Love (But I Won't Do That)" and Bat Out of Hell II: Back into Hell 24 October 1993 (three weeks) and 21 November 1993 (two weeks)
- Mariah Carey – "Without You" and Music Box 20 February 1994 (three weeks)
- Wet Wet Wet – "Love Is All Around" and End of Part One: Their Greatest Hits 24 July 1994 (four weeks) and 28 August 1994 (one week)
- Céline Dion – "Think Twice" and The Colour of My Love 29 January 1995 (five weeks)
- Simply Red – "Fairground" and Life 15 October 1995 (one week)
- Robson & Jerome – "I Believe" / "Up on the Roof" and Robson & Jerome 19 November 1995 (two weeks)
- Oasis – "Don't Look Back in Anger" and (What's the Story) Morning Glory? 25 February 1996 (one week)
- Spice Girls – "2 Become 1" and Spice 22 December 1996 (three weeks)
- Spice Girls – "Mama" / "Who Do You Think You Are" and Spice 16 March 1997 (two weeks)
- Hanson – "MMMBop" and Middle of Nowhere 15 June 1997 (one week)

=== 2000s ===
- Limp Bizkit – "Rollin'" and Chocolate Starfish and the Hot Dog Flavored Water 28 January 2001 (one week)
- Hear'Say – "Pure and Simple" and Popstars 1 April 2001 (one week)
- Shaggy – "Angel" and Hot Shot 3 June 2001 (one week)
- Kylie Minogue – "Can't Get You Out of My Head" and Fever 7 October 2001 (two weeks)
- Robbie Williams – "Somethin' Stupid" and Swing When You're Winning 16 December 2001 (three weeks)
- Enrique Iglesias – "Hero" and Escape 10 February 2002 (two weeks)
- Atomic Kitten – "The Tide Is High (Get the Feeling)" and Feels So Good 15 September 2002 (one week)
- Evanescence – "Bring Me to Life" and Fallen 22 June 2003 (one week)
- Beyoncé – "Crazy in Love" and Dangerously in Love 6 July 2003 (three weeks)
- Will Young – "Leave Right Now" and Friday's Child 7 December 2003 (one week)
- Usher – "Yeah!" and Confessions 28 March 2004 (one week)
- The Streets – "Dry Your Eyes" and A Grand Don't Come for Free 25 July 2004 (one week)
- Tony Christie – "(Is This the Way to) Amarillo" and Definitive Collection 27 March 2005 (two weeks)
- Akon – "Lonely" and Trouble 8 May 2005 (one week)
- James Blunt – "You're Beautiful" and Back to Bedlam 17 July 2005 (five weeks)
- Sugababes – "Push the Button" and Taller in More Ways 16 October 2005 (one week)
- Westlife – "You Raise Me Up" and Face to Face 6 November 2005 (one week)
- Madonna – "Hung Up" and Confessions on a Dance Floor 20 November 2005 (two weeks)
- Gnarls Barkley – "Crazy" and St. Elsewhere 30 April 2006 (one week)
- Scissor Sisters – "I Don't Feel Like Dancin'" and Ta-Dah 24 September 2006 (two weeks)
- Take That – "Patience" and Beautiful World 3 December 2006 (three weeks)
- Mika – "Grace Kelly" and Life in Cartoon Motion 11 February 2007 (two weeks)
- Rihanna – "Umbrella" and Good Girl Gone Bad 10 June 2007 (one week)
- Sugababes – "About You Now" and Change 14 October 2007 (one week)
- Leona Lewis – "Bleeding Love" and Spirit 18 November 2007 (four weeks)
- Duffy – "Mercy" and Rockferry 9 March 2008 (two weeks)
- Madonna – "4 Minutes" and Hard Candy 4 May 2008 (one week)
- Coldplay – "Viva la Vida" and Viva la Vida or Death and All His Friends 22 June 2008 (one week)
- Kings of Leon – "Sex on Fire" and Only by the Night 28 September 2008 (one week)
- Lily Allen – "The Fear" and It's Not Me, It's You 15 February 2009 (one week)
- Lady Gaga – "Poker Face" and The Fame 5 April 2009 (one week)
- Cheryl Cole – "Fight for This Love" and 3 Words 1 November 2009 (one week)

=== 2010s ===
- Lady Gaga – "Telephone" and The Fame 21 March 2010 (one week)
- Rihanna – "What's My Name?" and Loud 9 January 2011 (one week)
- Bruno Mars – "Grenade" and Doo-Wops & Hooligans 23 January 2011 (one week)
- Adele – "Someone Like You" and 21 20 February 2011 (four weeks) and 27 March 2011 (one week)
- Rihanna – "We Found Love" and Talk That Talk 27 November 2011 (one week)
- Gary Barlow – "Sing" and Sing 10 June 2012 (one week)
- Robbie Williams – "Candy" and Take the Crown 11 November 2012 (one week)
- One Direction – "Little Things" and Take Me Home 18 November 2012 (one week)
- Olly Murs – "Troublemaker" and Right Place Right Time 2 December 2012 (one week)
- Miley Cyrus – "Wrecking Ball" and Bangerz 13 October 2013 (one week)
- Mark Ronson – "Uptown Funk" and Uptown Special 25 January 2015 (one week)
- Sam Smith – "Lay Me Down" and In the Lonely Hour 15 March 2015 (one week)
- Drake – "One Dance" and Views 6 May 2016 (one week) and 20 May 2016 (one week)
- Ed Sheeran – "Shape of You" and ÷ 10 March 2017 (five weeks) and 21 April 2017 (one week)
- Ed Sheeran – "Perfect" and ÷ 15 December 2017 (one week) and 29 December 2017 (two weeks)
- Drake – "In My Feelings" and Scorpion 20 July 2018 (one week)
- Ariana Grande – "Break Up with Your Girlfriend, I'm Bored" and Thank U, Next 15 February 2019 (one week)
- Ariana Grande – "7 Rings" and Thank U, Next 22 February 2019 (one week)
- Ed Sheeran – "Beautiful People" and No.6 Collaborations Project 19 July 2019 (one week)

=== 2020s ===
- Stormzy – "Own It" and Heavy Is the Head 10 January 2020 (one week)
- Eminem – "Godzilla" and Music to Be Murdered By 24 January 2020 (one week)
- Drake – "Toosie Slide" and Dark Lane Demo Tapes 8 May 2020 (one week)
- Ariana Grande – "Positions" and Positions 6 November 2020 (one week)
- Olivia Rodrigo – "Good 4 U" and Sour 28 May 2021 (two weeks) and 25 June 2021 (one week)
- Adele – "Easy on Me" and 30 26 November 2021 (two weeks)
- Ed Sheeran – "Merry Christmas" and = 31 December 2021 (one week)
- Harry Styles – "As It Was" and Harry's House 27 May 2022 (one week) and 10 June 2022 (one week)
- Taylor Swift – "Anti-Hero" and Midnights 28 October 2022 (two weeks)
- Miley Cyrus – "Flowers" and Endless Summer Vacation 17 March 2023 (one week)
- Ellie Goulding – "Miracle" and Higher Than Heaven 14 April 2023 (one week)
- Taylor Swift – "Is It Over Now?" and 1989 (Taylor's Version) 3 November 2023 (one week)
- Noah Kahan – "Stick Season" and Stick Season 16 February 2024 (one week)
- Beyoncé – "Texas Hold 'Em" and Cowboy Carter 5 April 2024 (one week)
- Taylor Swift – "Fortnight" and The Tortured Poets Department 26 April 2024 (one week)
- Sabrina Carpenter – "Taste" and Short n' Sweet 30 August 2024 (one week)
- Olivia Dean – "Man I Need" and The Art of Loving 3 October 2025 (one week)
- Taylor Swift – "The Fate of Ophelia" and The Life of a Showgirl 10 October 2025 (three weeks) and 14 November 2025 (one week)
- Harry Styles – "American Girls" and Kiss All the Time. Disco, Occasionally 13 March 2026 (one week)
- Olivia Dean – "Rein Me In" and The Art of Loving 17 April 2026 (one week)
- Taylor Swift – "Patient Zero" and The Life of a Showgirl 2 October 2026 (one week)

== See also ==
- List of artists who have achieved simultaneous number-one single and album in the United States
- Lists of UK Albums Chart number ones
- Lists of UK Singles Chart number ones
