= Deckscar =

Neil Barrett
- Also known as: Deckscar
- Born: 1986 (age 39–40)
- Origin: Hertfordshire, London, England
- Genres: Dubstep, drum and bass, progressive house, electro house, drumstep
- Occupations: Music producer, dj
- Years active: 2008–present
- Website: deckscar.com

Neil Barrett (born 1986), better known by his stage name Deckscar, is a dubstep DJ and music producer from Hertfordshire, England. Actively Producing and DJing since 2010, his first release was in 2011 "Cross Over EP" with Bill Posters.

Neil was the singer/songwriter for a rock band for over seven years. While studying at University in London, he began producing dance music and used the student nights run by the university to play sets at Electroworks in Angel and later at clubs such as Fabric and Ministry of Sound.

From a background in creating music, he quickly started to put together sets of originals, remixes, and bootlegs of his own design, incorporating classic anthems with his super heavy bass creations to come up with sets of his own design. It was October 2011 when he released his first track as a producer, "Feel Good", which reached number 40 in the Beatport charts for the month of September. As a result of his efforts, he has now worked with acts such as Natasha Bedingfield, Daniel Bedingfield, Chicane, Cutline, and so on.

Deckscar Recently became an ambassador for a Charity Global Angels Global Angels an international charity founded by Molly Bedingfield. Molly's children Daniel Bedingfield, Natasha Bedingfield and Nikola Rachelle have contributed greatly to the organisation and the organisation is a children's charity meant to stop child trafficking and child poverty.

== Career ==
Whilst being a singer/songwriter for a rock band for over 7 years, Deckscar always had a passion for club music and began fusing this style with his rock outfit. In 2010 he took this one step forward by getting himself a set of decks. During his years studying at university in London, Deckscar took advantage of his location and the regular student nights on all over the city.

After securing regular DJ sets at popular club Electroworks in Angel, and subsequently world-renowned clubs such as Fabric and Ministry of Sound within the first year of playing. He was offered a weekly residency at Punk on Oxford Street and at The Egg in King's Cross. Since then he has had the opportunity to play at festivals such as Rhythms of The World in Hertfordshire, The V-Festival in Chelmsford, UK and Pacha in Mallorca, Spain.

Deckscar's SJ sets became well known for being a roller-coaster of serious music, riding between drum and bass, dubstep, electro house, and moombahton.

Having come from a background of creating music, Deckscar put together sets of original music and remixes by incorporating classic anthems with heavy bass. As a producer he released his first track "Feel Good" in September 2011 getting to number 40 in the beatport charts. He has worked with acts such as Natasha and Daniel Bedingfield, X-Factor Uk's Gamu, Hani, and Cutline. Deckscar has also had a number of press features including Computer Music Magazine praising his production skills.

DJ Excision has been playing "Deckscar's remix of The Prodigy's "Voodoo People" on Tour since 2011 and also featured the remix on his Shambhala 2012 Dubstep Mix.

== ReMixes ==
Official Remixes 2012 – 2013
1. Natasha Bedingfield ft Jamie Foxx – Weightless (Deckscar Official Remix)
2. MarcosCarnaval, Carlo Astuti Ft' Niles Mason – I Will Follow You (Deckscar Official Remix) Released 9 April 2013
3. C-Beam – I Cant Wait (Deckscar Official Remix)
4. Room 94 – Ignorance Is Bliss (Deckscar Official Remix)
5. Visitors – Oxygen (Deckscar Official Remix)
6. Visitors – Oxygen (Deckscar Dubstep VIP Remix)
7. The Wideboys – The Word (Deckscar Official Remix)
Unofficial 2012
1. The Prodigy – Voodoo People (Deckscar Remix)
2. Robert Miles – Children (Deckscar Remix)
