= Like a Saviour =

Single by Ellie Goulding

from the album Higher Than Heaven
- Released: 1 February 2023
- Genre: Pop; dance
- Length: 3:40
- Label: Polydor
- Songwriters: Ellie Goulding; Tom Mann; Anthony Rossomando; Andrew Wells
- Producers: Andrew Wells; Koz

Ellie Goulding singles chronology
"Let It Die" (2022)	"Like a Saviour" (2023)	"Miracle" (2023)

Music video
- "Like a Saviour" on YouTube

"Like a Saviour" is a song by English singer-songwriter Ellie Goulding, released on 1 February 2023, through Polydor Records as the third single from her fifth studio album, Higher Than Heaven (2023). It was written by Goulding, Tom Mann, Anthony Rossomando and Andrew Wells, and produced by Wells and Koz.

== Background and release ==
Following the third single from Goulding's then-upcoming fifth studio album Higher Than Heaven (2023), "Let It Die", "Like a Saviour" serves as the fourth single and second with Goulding as the only main artist credited. Before the song's release, she revealed that the single would arrive on 1 February, and posted a snippet of the song through teasers on her social media.

About the making of the track, Goulding explained in a post shared on her social media accounts: "We made 'Like A Saviour' as we were coming out of lockdown and it's one I've been waiting for you to all hear. I hope you love it too! Sending warmth, Ellie x"

== Composition ==
"Like a Saviour" is a pop and dance song, offering "'80s-inspired synths" and described as "bona fide anthem". As the track was produced by KOZ, it spans "disco, '80s pop, and '90s house", incorporating the "irresistible starburst choruses".

== Critical reception ==
The song was met with critical acclaim. In his review for the album Higher Than Heaven for Riff, journalist Mike DeWald highlighted the track, stating: "The magnificent track is carried by a percussive groove buoyed by a flute-like sample that gives it a throwback personality. Goulding's singing and dialed-in arrangement make for one of the best songs on the album." Music critic Roy Lott, for MXDWN, described the song as a: "catchy dance tune about her lover picking her spirit up when she has been down on herself."

== Music video and live performance ==
The accompanying music video for "Like a Saviour" was dropped alongside the song's release on the same day, 1 February 2023, directed by Joe Connor featuring choreography by Daniel Alwell. The Independent newspaper described the music video: "In the clip, the singer and a cohort of backing dancers are stranded in a desert and have to fight against the landscape". On 10 December 2022, Goulding performed the track for the first time at the Domain Sydney concert in Australia.

== Personnel ==
Credits were adapted from Spotify.

- Ellie Goulding – songwriting, vocals
- Andrew Wells – songwriting, producer
- Anthony Rossomando – songwriting
- Tom Mann – songwriting
- Koz – producer

== Charts ==
Chart (2023)	Peak position
Czech Republic Airplay (ČNS IFPI)	11
New Zealand Hot Singles (RMNZ)	35
Slovakia Airplay (ČNS IFPI)	44
UK Singles Sales Chart (OCC)	38
UK Singles Downloads Chart (OCC)	37

== Release history ==
Region	Date	Format	Label	Ref.
Various	1 February 2023	Digital download; streaming	Polydor; Universal	
