= Monotonic scale =

Musical scale consisting of only one note in the octave

A monotonic scale is a musical scale consisting of only one note in the octave. Having a deliberate fixed note, the monotonic is still a musical form rather than a total absence of melody. The monotonic stands in contrast to more common musical scales, such as the pentatonic (five notes) and modern, common Western heptatonic and chromatic scales.

== Liturgical usage ==
Early Christian liturgical recitation may have been monotonic. Charles William Pearce speculated that the monotonic psalm tone might have been an intermediary step between spoken recitation of the Psalter and melodic singing:

Congregational—rather than solo—recitation of the Psalter was a distinctive feature of early Christian worship. Naturally, the first step in the history of collective Psalter-recitation would be the saying of the words by each individual member of the community or congregation in his or her ordinary conversational voice: something entirely different to the singing worship of the persecutors whether Jewish or Roman. The next step, as a deliverance from such an inevitable vocal chaos, would be the introduction of a monotonic recitation i.e. the adoption of some note of fixed pitch upon which both men and women could recite collectively, with an octave or some other concordant interval between them.... The melodic structure of a "Gregorian" Psalm "Tone" of early date conveys the strongest possible suggestion—if not actual evidence—of such a system of monotonic recitation having been tried and improved upon, because apparently it did not meet the necessities of community or congregational recitation. Reading between the lines, it can easily be seen that the love of variety, the craving for melody however simple, the desire not to unduly wear out the voice by continually singing upon only one note, led to the "inflection" of the monotonic recitation as a necessary vocal relief. Such inflection was easily obtained by causing the voice at the middle and end of every psalm-verse to wander away from the monotone to some adjacent scale-degree.

The Annotated Book of Common Prayer similarly notes that (according to Saint Augustine) Saint Athanasius discouraged variance in note in liturgical recitation, but that eventual modulation of the note led to the development of plainsong.

In Māori Christian services in Auckland, New Zealand, the Ten Commandments and the Psalms are sung in a responsorial style called waiata (the Māori word for song), with monotonic chanting alternating between the minister and the congregation. Some of the congregation may sing at the interval of a third above the others, and sometimes a few of the women will add a fourth below, producing a constant second-inversion triad. The end of each phrase is marked by a descending glissando.

== Art music ==
Monotonic passages are also used in art music for stylistic effect. In Schubert's Death and the Maiden, the character of Death generally employs monotonic recitation, described by one scholar as depicting "an inanimate being incapable of the lyricism of the living." In La gazza ladra (1817), Rossini represents Ninetta's simplicity and innocence with an almost monotone declamation at "A mio nome deh consegna questo anello", whereas in the Wolf's Glen scene of Der Freischütz (1821), Weber characterizes the powers of evil by having the invisible spirits sing in monotone, and denies song entirely to Samiel and, finally, also to Max as he succumbs to Samiel's power. Another use of the monotonic scale occurs in the first piece of György Ligeti's Musica ricercata, which almost exclusively employs the note A played in a variety of different techniques.

Art songs where the vocal part is sung entirely in monotone include Gioachino Rossini's "Adieux à la vie! (Élégie sur une seule note)" from Volume 2 of Péchés de vieillesse, and Peter Cornelius's "Ein Ton" from his song cycle Trauer und Trost (Op. 3, No. 3). In his opera Ciro in Babilonia, Rossini also wrote a monotone aria "Chi disprezza gl'infelici" for Anna Savinelli, who sang the role of Argene and, according to Rossini, had only one good note in her range.

== See also ==
- Drone music
