= Nimmo (band) =

British electronic music band

Nimmo, previously known as Nimmo & the Gauntlets are a British electronic music band from London, consisting of Sarah Nimmo and Reva Gauntlett. The pair met at school in Kilburn, north west London.

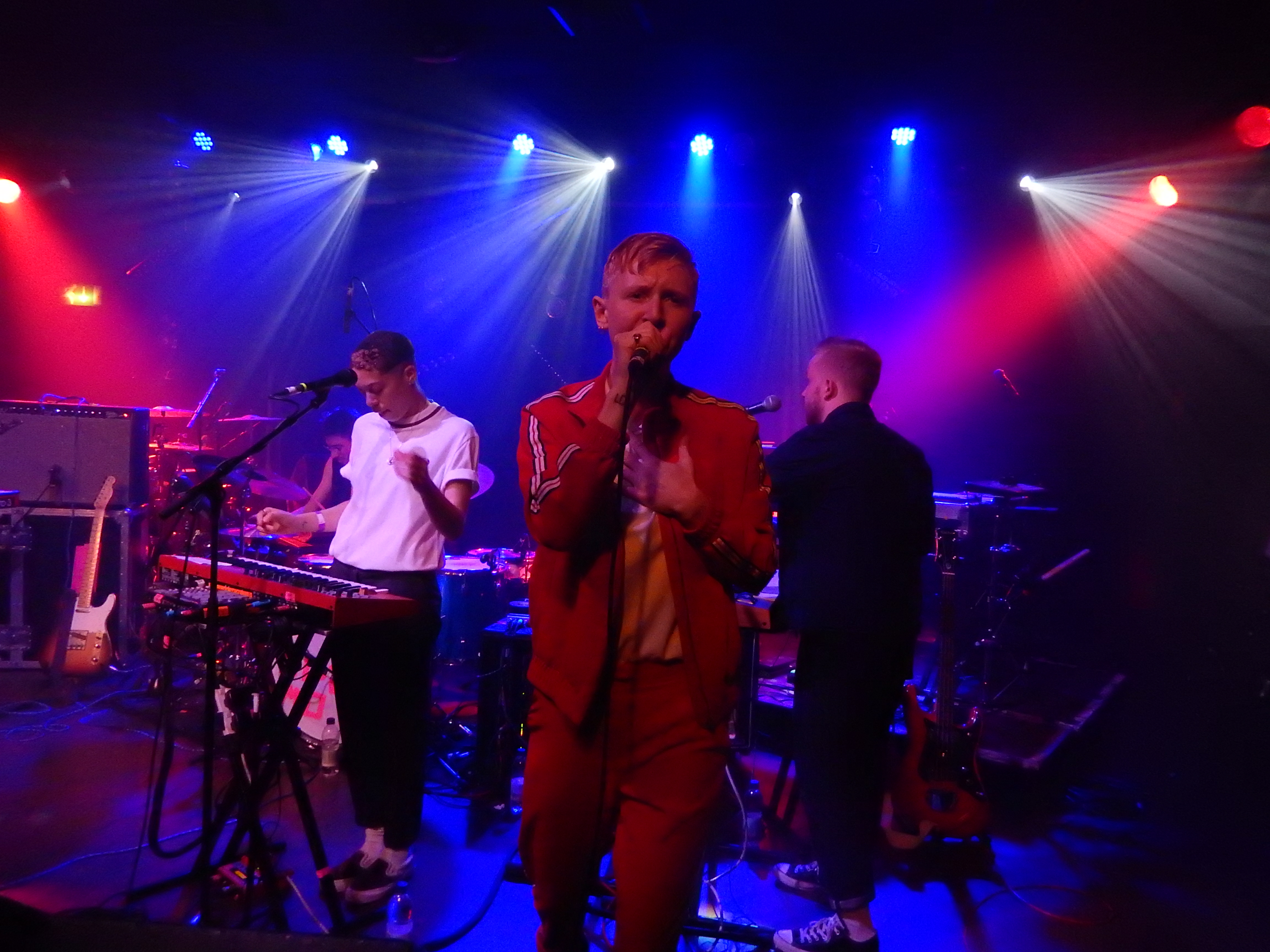

== Discography ==
=== Studio albums ===
- The Power (2019)

=== Extended plays ===
- Room 5 Sessions (2016)
- Songs from the Credits (2018)

=== Singles ===
- "Jaded" (2014)
- "Others" (2014)
- "Dilute This" (2015)
- "UnYoung" (2015)
- "Touch Me" (2016)
- "My Only Friend" (2016)
- "Dancing Makes Us Brave" (2016)
- "Too Late" (2018)
- "Orange Skies" (2018)
- "It's Easier" (2018)
- "No More" (2019)
- "Everything I Wanted" (2019)
- "The Power" (2019)
- "Place to Rent" (2019)
- "Do I Have to Learn It?" (2020)
- "Come Back" (2020)
- "Company" (2022)
- "You Better Mean It" (2022)
- "When I'm With You" (2023)
- "Looking For Loving" (2023)

=== Featured singles ===
- Wax Wings - "Reclaim Me" (2020)
- TSHA - "OnlyL" (2021)
