= Let It Die (Ellie Goulding song) =

Single by Ellie Goulding

from the album Higher Than Heaven
- Released: 19 October 2022
- Length: 2:46
- Label: Polydor
- Songwriters: Ellie Goulding; Tom Mann; Andrea Rocha; Lostboy
- Producer: Lostboy

Ellie Goulding singles chronology
"All by Myself" (2022)	"Let It Die" (2022)	"Like a Saviour" (2023)

Music video
- "Let It Die" on YouTube

"Let It Die" is a song by English singer-songwriter Ellie Goulding, released on 19 October 2022 through Polydor Records, as the second single from her fifth studio album, Higher Than Heaven (2023). It was written by Goulding, Tom Mann, Andrea Rocha, and Lostboy, and produced by the latter. This is the second song by Ellie Goulding with the title; the first is a Target bonus track from Goulding's third studio album Delirium (2015).

== Music video ==
A music video for "Let It Die" was released on the same day, along with the song's release to her Vevo channel, directed by Carlota Guerrero. It received an age restriction from YouTube on its day of release, as the singer showed a nipple in the video. As of 8 September 2026, the video exceeded over 1.4 million views.

== Live performances ==
"Let It Die" got its television debut performance on The Jonathan Ross Show on 5 November 2022, on which Goulding served as the musical guest. Later on that month, she would end up performing the song at the festival, Hits Live 2023 by Hits Radio.

== Credits and personnel ==
Credits were adapted from Spotify.

- Ellie Goulding – songwriting, vocals
- Lostboy – songwriting, production, bass, drum programmer, mixing engineer, keyboards, programmer
- Tom Mann – songwriting
- Andrea Rocha – songwriting
- Randy Merrill – mastering engineer

== Charts ==
Chart (2022)	Peak position
New Zealand Hot Singles (RMNZ)	32
