= Aaron Paris =

Canadian songwriter, producer, multi-instrumentalist

- Born: Aaron Paryce Cheung; April 9, 1996 (age 30); Toronto, Ontario, Canada
- Other name: Strings From Paris
- Education: University of Toronto
- Musical career
- Genres: R&B; hip-hop; pop; classical
- Occupations: Songwriter; producer; multi-instrumentalist; music director
- Label: Kilometre Music Group
- Website: aaronparis.com

Aaron Paryce Cheung, better known by his stage name Aaron Paris, is a Chinese-Canadian composer, songwriter, record producer, string instrumentalist, and music artist, best known for his contributions to Ariana Grande's album Eternal Sunshine, Don Toliver's album Octane, and assorted Rosalía, Kehlani, Russ, Kanye West, and PartyNextDoor projects.

== Career ==
=== Early life ===
During childhood, Cheung began listening to the classical rock music his dad played for him. In high school, he immersed himself into hip hop groups, jazz bands, and classical music, later joining the Toronto Symphony Youth Orchestra as a violinist. He grew up in Toronto with fellow producers Jack Rochon and Akeel Henry.

=== Music Industry ===
In 2022, Cheung appeared on "Borders", a song from artist Luna Li's instrumental EP Jams 2. He also formed 'Strings From Paris', a Toronto social media viral string collective that aims to break down barriers between classical and contemporary music.

In 2023, Cheung co-produced and scored Russ’ entire concept album SANTIAGO along with the SANTIAGO Short Film.

In March 2024, Cheung co-produced, composed, and played violin, guitar, synthesizer, and bass on Ariana Grande's song "Intro (End of the World)" which peaked at #38 on the US Billboard Hot 100 and #19 on the Billboard Global 200 charts. In November 2024, Aaron released his own debut instrumental album Lotusland. It was recorded over two days in Toronto's St. Andrew's Church with a full orchestra. Lotusland subsequently went on to win the 2026 JUNO Award for Instrumental Album of the Year.

In 2025, Cheung was the musical director for Charlotte Day Wilson's Red Bull Symphonic performance, which included a full band, choir, and the Toronto Symphony Orchestra together bridging Motown, jazz, and R&B.

In 2026, Cheung co-produced, composed, and played violin and synthesizer on Don Toliver's song "E85", which reached #1 on Billboard’s Hot Rap Songs chart and peaked at #15 on the US Billboard Hot 100.

== Discography ==
=== Studio albums ===
LOTUSLAND (2024)

=== Selected songwriting & production credits ===
Title	Year	Artist	Album
"LLF"	2021	Roddy Ricch	Live Life Fast
"Sci-Fi"	2022	Kanye West	Donda 2
"No Secret" (featuring Drake)	2022	DJ Khaled	God Did
"Deserve Me" (with Summer Walker)	2023	Kali Uchis	Red Moon in Venus
"Oxygen"	2023	Sean Leon	In Loving Memory
"Kingsley's Outro"	2023	Sean Leon	In Loving Memory
"Wunna Dem" (with Quiñ)	2023	6lack	Since I Have a Lover
"Whitney"	2023	Rêve	Saturn Return
"Tough Love" (featuring Swae Lee)	2023	Diddy	The Love Album: Off the Grid
"Intro (End of the World)"	2024	Ariana Grande	Eternal Sunshine
"Crash"	2024	Kehlani	Crash
"Real Woman"	2024	PartyNextDoor	PartyNextDoor 4
"Listen Up"	2025	Lil Baby	WHAM
"Catch A Stray"	2025	Leon Thomas III	Mutt Deluxe: HEEL
"Mud"	2025	Giveon	Beloved
"E85"	2026	Don Toliver	Octane
"Intro"	2026	YG	The Gentlemen's Club
"Kudos"	2026	YG	The Gentlemen's Club
"Simon Says" (featuring Isaiah Falls, Odeal & Sasha Keable)	2026	YG	The Gentlemen's Club
"Writing My Wrongs" (featuring Ogi)	2026	YG	The Gentlemen's Club
"Back to Start"	2026	Mike D	Thank You
"I Know Too Much"	2026	Ellie Goulding	I Know Too Much

=== Selected strings (violin, viola, cello, bass, guitar) credits ===
Title	Year	Artist	Album
"Black Sheep Nirvana"	2017	Sean Leon	I Think You've Gone Mad (Or the Sins of the Father)
"Salt Lake City"	2017	Sean Leon	I Think You've Gone Mad (Or the Sins of the Father)
"You Let Me Down"	2021	Alessia Cara	In the Meantime
"Disco at the Strip Club"	2023	Rêve	Saturn Return
"Release Me"	2023	Rêve	Saturn Return
"Soul It Screams"	2024	Marcus King	Mood Swings
"Bipolar Love"	2024	Marcus King	Mood Swings
"Trinidad"	2025	Geese	Getting Killed
"Husbands"	2025	Geese	Getting Killed
"Bow Down"	2025	Geese	Getting Killed
"Everybody Scream"	2025	Florence and the Machine	Everybody Scream
"Witch Dance"	2025	Florence and the Machine	Everybody Scream
"Music by Men"	2025	Florence and the Machine	Everybody Scream
"You Can Have It All"	2025	Florence and the Machine	Everybody Scream
"Sexo, Violencia y Llantas"	2025	Rosalía	Lux
"La Yugular"	2025	Rosalía	Lux
"Novia Robot"	2025	Rosalía	Lux
"La Rumba del Perdón" (with Estrella Morente & Sílvia Pérez Cruz)	2025	Rosalía	Lux
"Black Prada Dress"	2026	Ellie Goulding	I Know Too Much
"Jealousy"	2026	Ellie Goulding	I Know Too Much
"4 Seasons"	2026	Ellie Goulding	I Know Too Much
"Misremember You"	2026	Ellie Goulding	I Know Too Much
"I Know Too Much"	2026	Ellie Goulding	I Know Too Much

=== Selected composer and scoring credits ===
Year	Title	Director(s)	Notes	Refs.
2024	RUSS - SANTIAGO (Short Film)	Karl Jungquist		
2025	King's Court (Documentary)	Serville Poblete	First collaboration with Poblete	
2026	Sunburn (Film)	Serville Poblete		

== Awards and nominations ==
Year	Ceremony	Award	Result	Ref
2024	Canadian Songwriters Hall of Fame	Breakthrough Songwriter Award	Won	
2024	SOCAN	Billboard Canada Non-Performing Songwriter Award	Nominated	
2025	Juno Awards of 2025	Jack Richardson Producer of the Year Award	Nominated	
2026	Juno Awards of 2026	Instrumental Album of the Year (Lotusland)	Won	
2027	69th Annual Grammy Awards	Best Rap Song ("E85")	Nominated	
