= 4 Seasons (song) =

Single by Ellie Goulding

from the album I Know Too Much
- Released: 31 July 2026
- Genre: Acoustic
- Length: 3:37
- Label: Polydor
- Songwriters: Ellie Goulding; Jack Rochon; Tyler Spry; Kiddo A.I.; Jon Byron
- Producer: Jack Rochon

Ellie Goulding singles chronology
"Hush" (2026)	"4 Seasons" (2026)	"Ravers" (2026)

Lyric video
- "4 Seasons" on YouTube

"4 Seasons" is a song by English singer-songwriter Ellie Goulding. It was released on 31 July 2026, through Polydor Records as the second single from her sixth studio album, I Know Too Much (2026). Gouding co-wrote the song with Jack Rochon, Tyler Spry, Kiddo A.I., and Jon Byron, while Rochon produced it.

== Composition ==
An acoustic ballad, "4 Seasons" was written by Goulding, Jack Rochon, Jon Byron, Tyler Spry, and Kiddo A.I., with Rochon handling its production. It combines organic instrumentation with shimmering electronic elements. Jon Stickler of Stereoboard described the track as a "vulnerable love song" that finds the singer-songwriter "embracing a softer side, pairing acoustic guitar with atmospheric textures".

== Promotion and release ==
On 7 June 2026, Goulding debuted "4 Seasons", alongside "Black Prada Dress" on BBC's Later... with Jools Holland as previews of her upcoming sixth studio album, I Know Too Much. The following month, she uploaded a one-minute teaser of the track on both YouTube and TikTok. Released on 31 July 2026, it appears as the fourth track on I Know Too Much.

== Personnel ==
Credits were adapted from Apple Music.

=== Performing artists ===
- Ellie Goulding — vocals
- Jack Rochon — guitar, piano
- Tyler Spry — guitar, bass, omnichord
- Aaron Paris — violin
- Todd Lombardo — acoustic guitar

=== Composition and lyrics ===
- Ellie Goulding — songwriter
- Jack Rochon — songwriter
- Tyler Spry — songwriter
- Kiddo A.I. — songwriter
- Jon Byron — songwriter

=== Production and engineer ===
- Jack Rochon — producer
- Tyler Spry — vocal producer
- Calum Landau — recording engineer, vocal producer
- Mark "Spike" Stent — mixing engineer
- Randy Merrill — mastering engineer
- Dave Emery — immersive mixing engineer

== Charts ==
Chart performance for "4 Seasons"
Chart (2026)	Peak position
Estonia Airplay (TopHit)	291

== Release history ==
Release dates and formats
Region	Date	Format(s)	Label	Ref.
Various	31 July 2026	Digital download; streaming	Polydor	
