= Ravers (song) =

- Promotional poster

Single by Ellie Goulding

from the album I Know Too Much
- Released: 5 August 2026
- Genre: Electronic; house; dance
- Length: 3:26
- Label: Polydor
- Songwriters: Dave Hamelin; Ellie Goulding; Jack Rochon; Solly; Sophie Cates
- Producers: Dave Hamelin; Jack Rochon

Ellie Goulding singles chronology
"4 Seasons" (2026)	"Ravers" (2026)	"For Your Entertainment" (2026)

Music video
- "Ravers" on YouTube

"Ravers" is a song by English singer-songwriter Ellie Goulding. It was released on 5 August 2026, through Polydor Records as the third single from her sixth studio album, I Know Too Much (2026). Goulding co-wrote the electronic, house, and dance song with Dave Hamelin, Jack Rochon, Solly, and Sophie Cates, while Hamelin and Rochon produced it.

== Background and release ==
Speaking to Zane Lowe, who premiered "Ravers" on his Apple Music show, Goulding explained that an electronic sound of "Ravers" recalled the "safe and beautiful place" she experienced while listening to electronic music as a child. Goulding said the genre gave her a sense of freedom and described "Ravers" as the song that felt closest to her at the time, calling it her "happy place". "Ravers" was released digitally by Polydor Records on 5 August 2026, as the third single from her sixth studio album, I Know Too Much, following "Black Prada Dress" and "4 Seasons". The accompanying music video followed two days later.

== Composition ==
Goulding provides vocals and is credited as a songwriter, while Dave Hamelin serves as a producer, songwriter, programmer and synthesiser. Jack Rochon is credited as a producer, songwriter and pianist, with Solly and Sophie Cates also credited as songwriters. Randy Merrill handled mastering, while Jeremy Wheatley handled mixing.

"Ravers" is a house, dance, and club-oriented electronic track. It contains samples from "Kalimankou Denkou (The Evening Gathering)" (1975), performed by the Bulgarian State Radio & Television Female Vocal Choir. Stereoboard's Jon Stickler felt that it draws on the electronic sound that has characterised much of her career, while recalling her earlier collaborations with artists including Calvin Harris, Four Tet, and Skrillex.

== Critical reception ==
Rolling Stone UK depicted "Ravers" as one of Goulding's biggest songs and praised her continued ability to craft electro-pop songs.

== Personnel ==
The credits were adapted from Tidal.

- Ellie Goulding – vocals, songwriter
- Dave Hamelin – producer, songwriter, programmer, synthesiser
- Jack Rochon – producer, songwriter, piano
- Solly – songwriter
- Sophie Cates – songwriter
- Randy Merrill – mastering engineer
- Jeremy Wheatley – mixing engineer
- Bulgarian State Radio & Television Female Vocal Choir – choir

== Charts ==
Chart performance
Chart (2026)	Peak position
Costa Rica Anglo Airplay (Monitor Latino)	10
Estonia Airplay (TopHit)	62
Lithuania Airplay (TopHit)	115
Malta Airplay (Radiomonitor)	17
Nicaragua Anglo Airplay (Monitor Latino)	2

== Release history ==
Release dates and formats
Region	Date	Format(s)	Label	Ref.
Various	5 August 2026	Digital download; streaming	Polydor	
