= Jack Rochon =

Canadian producer and songwriter

- Born: Jack Sheppard Rochon; Toronto, Ontario, Canada
- Other name: Jack Ro
- Musical career
- Genres: R&B; soul; pop
- Occupations: Producer; songwriter; multi-instrumentalist
- Label: Pulse Music Group

Jack Sheppard Rochon is a Canadian producer, songwriter and classically trained multi-instrumentalist, best known for his work with Sean Leon, Daniel Caesar, Charlotte Day Wilson, and his various contributions to Beyoncé's 2024 album Cowboy Carter.

In 2026, he became a key creative collaborator of English electropop songstress Ellie Goulding, serving as the executive producer and co-writer of her sixth studio album, I Know Too Much. He had previously co-written "Hypnotized" Goulding's 2025 collaboration with Anyma, and "Destiny" for the anime series Clevatess.

== Early life ==
Rochon grew up in Toronto alongside fellow producers Aaron Paris and Akeel Henry.

== Career ==
In 2022, Rochon executive-produced singer-songwriter Nija Charles' drill-influenced debut album Don't Say I Didn't Warn You on Capitol Records. In 2023, Rochon produced single "Regardless" for new OVO Sound signee Naomi Sharon.

Rochon has also frequently worked with singer-songwriter Charlotte Day Wilson, who credited Rochon (in a bid to escape what she describes as “perfectionist tendencies”) with "pushing her to be the best she could be while avoiding getting bogged down in the details that she felt had marred recording in the past" in a recent interview with The Fader celebrating the release of 2024 album Cyan Blue.

In 2024, Rochon was recently nominated in the Best Engineered Album, Non-Classical category at the 67th Annual Grammy Awards for his production contributions to Cyan Blue. On January 10, 2025, Anyma and Ellie Goulding released "Hypnotized" which Rochon co-wrote. The song marked his first collaboration with Goulding, who announced that Rochon would serve as the executive producer of her sixth studio album. On March 30, 2025, Rochon won the Jack Richardson Producer of the Year Award at the 2025 Juno Awards for his extensive contributions to Cowboy Carter, Crash, and Cyan Blue.

In 2026, Rochon served as the executive producer and co-writer of Ellie Goulding's sixth studio album I Know Too Much, which was released on September 4 and spawned four singles: "Black Prada Dress", "4 Seasons", "Ravers", and "For Your Entertainment". Rochon produced nine of the album's 10 tracks and co-wrote eight of them.

A deluxe edition titled We Know Too Much, featuring six new tracks, was released on September 7. Rochon co-wrote all six tracks and produced five of them. A second re-edition, titled You Know Too Much, featuring six additional tracks, was released on September 11. It included the previously released single "Destiny", which was written as the ending theme for the anime series Clevatess, released on November 12, 2025.

== Personal life ==
Rochon is currently based in Los Angeles.

== Discography ==
=== Executive-produced/co-written projects ===
Albums with ~ 50% Jack Rochon production/songwriting credits or more
Album	Re-editions	Artist	Year	Label
I Know Too Much	We Know Too Much	Ellie Goulding	2026	Polydor Records
I Know Too Much	You Know Too Much	Ellie Goulding	2026	Polydor Records

=== Selected songwriting & production credits ===
Title	Year	Artist	Songwriter	Producer	Album	Ref.
"Suburbia (Heaven Or)"	2017	Sean Leon	X mark	check	I Think You've Gone Mad (Or the Sins of the Father)	
"Matthew In The Middle" (featuring Daniel Caesar)	2017	Sean Leon	X mark	check	I Think You've Gone Mad (Or the Sins of the Father)	
"Win"	2017	Sean Leon	X mark	check	I Think You've Gone Mad (Or the Sins of the Father)	
"Kill My Mind"	2017	Sean Leon	X mark	check	I Think You've Gone Mad (Or the Sins of the Father)	
"Black Sheep Nirvana"	2017	Sean Leon	X mark	check	I Think You've Gone Mad (Or the Sins of the Father)	
"Xylo's Lullaby / Sweet Girls Always Fall for the Monsters"	2017	Sean Leon	X mark	check	I Think You've Gone Mad (Or the Sins of the Father)	
"I Made It / Debt & Vendettas / Summer Now"	2017	Sean Leon	X mark	check	I Think You've Gone Mad (Or the Sins of the Father)	
"Hey Pretty Girl with the Dirty Mouth II"	2017	Sean Leon	X mark	check	I Think You've Gone Mad (Or the Sins of the Father)	
"Salt Lake City"	2017	Sean Leon	X mark	check	I Think You've Gone Mad (Or the Sins of the Father)	
"Redway's Song" (featuring Redway)	2017	Sean Leon	X mark	check	I Think You've Gone Mad (Or the Sins of the Father)	
"The Drowning Man"	2017	Sean Leon	X mark	check	I Think You've Gone Mad (Or the Sins of the Father)	
"Parkdale Cartel Freestyle II"	2017	Sean Leon	X mark	check	C.C.W.M.T.T.	
"The Rat Race"	2017	Sean Leon	X mark	check	C.C.W.M.T.T.	
"Laying Low (Cooking Up)"	2017	Sean Leon	X mark	check	C.C.W.M.T.T.	
"2017"	2017	Sean Leon	X mark	check	C.C.W.M.T.T.	
"25 & Whyln"	2017	Sean Leon	X mark	check	C.C.W.M.T.T.	
"Out of the Ordinary"	2019	Jacquees	X mark	check	King of R&B	
"Float"	2020	6lack	check	check	6pc Hot EP	
"I Can Only Whisper" (featuring BadBadNotGood)	2021	Charlotte Day Wilson	check	X mark	Alpha	
"If I Could"	2021	Charlotte Day Wilson	check	check	Alpha	
"Lovesick Utopia"	2021	Charlotte Day Wilson	X mark	check	Alpha	
"Take Care of You" (featuring Syd)	2021	Charlotte Day Wilson	check	check	Alpha	
"Keep Moving"	2021	Charlotte Day Wilson	check	X mark	Alpha	
"Even Is the Lie"	2021	Charlotte Day Wilson	check	check	Alpha	
"Blank" (featuring Anthony Hamilton)	2022	DaBaby	check	check	Baby on Baby 2	
"Hear Me Out"	2023	Exo	check	check	Exist	
"Sad Forever"	2023	Lauren Spencer-Smith	check	check	Mirror	
"Aquarius"	2023	Sean Leon	X mark	check	In Loving Memory	
"Dishonored"	2023	Sean Leon	X mark	check	In Loving Memory	
"Regardless"	2023	Naomi Sharon	check	check	Obsidian	
"Protector"	2024	Beyoncé	check	check	Cowboy Carter	
"Dolly P"	2024	Beyoncé	X mark	check	Cowboy Carter	
"Jolene"	2024	Beyoncé	X mark	check	Cowboy Carter	
"II Hands II Heaven"	2024	Beyoncé	check	check	Cowboy Carter	
"Hero"	2024	Charlie Puth	check	check	Non-album single	
"Crash"	2024	Kehlani	check	check	Crash	
"Tears" (featuring Omah Lay)	2024	Kehlani	check	check	Crash	
"Vegas"	2024	Kehlani	check	check	Crash	
"Deep"	2024	Kehlani	check	check	Crash	
"Chapel"	2024	Kehlani	check	check	Crash	
"Lose My Wife"	2024	Kehlani	check	check	Crash	
"Border"	2024	Kehlani	check	check	While We Wait 2	
"Garden Interlude"	2025	Alessia Cara	X mark	check	Love & Hyperbole	
"Hypnotized" (with Ellie Goulding)	2025	Anyma	check	X mark	The End of Genesys	
"Destiny"	2025	Ellie Goulding	check	check	You Know Too Much	
"Black Prada Dress"	2026	Ellie Goulding	check	check	I Know Too Much	
"Jealousy"	2026	Ellie Goulding	check	check	I Know Too Much	
"Loser"	2026	Ellie Goulding	check	check	I Know Too Much	
"4 Seasons"	2026	Ellie Goulding	check	check	I Know Too Much	
"Always Think of You"	2026	Ellie Goulding	X mark	check	I Know Too Much	
"For Your Entertainment"	2026	Ellie Goulding	check	check	I Know Too Much	
"Misremember You"	2026	Ellie Goulding	check	check	I Know Too Much	
"I Know Too Much"	2026	Ellie Goulding	check	check	I Know Too Much	
"Ravers"	2026	Ellie Goulding	check	check	I Know Too Much	
"Nice Things"	2026	Ellie Goulding	check	check	We Know Too Much	
"Sweet Delusion"	2026	Ellie Goulding	check	check	We Know Too Much	
"Right Hand"	2026	Ellie Goulding	check	check	We Know Too Much	
"All the Time"	2026	Ellie Goulding	check	check	We Know Too Much	
"Fields of Love"	2026	Ellie Goulding	check	check	We Know Too Much	
"Ways to Hurt"	2026	Ellie Goulding	check	X mark	We Know Too Much	

== Awards and nominations ==
Year	Ceremony	Award	Result	Ref
2025	67th Annual Grammy Awards	Grammy Award for Best Engineered Album, Non-Classical (Cyan Blue)	Nominated	
2025	Juno Awards	Jack Richardson Producer of the Year Award	Won	
