= For Your Entertainment =

For Your Entertainment may refer to:

- For Your Entertainment (album), a 2009 album by Adam Lambert
  - "For Your Entertainment" (Adam Lambert song), the title track
- "For Your Entertainment" (Ellie Goulding song), 2026
- FYE (For Your Entertainment), a chain of entertainment media retail stores operated by Trans World Entertainment
- "For Your Entertainment", a song by The Charlatans (UK) from Simpatico
- "For Your Entertainment", a song by Unwound from Repetition
