= Eestbound =

Canadian record producer and audio engineer

- Born: Bryan Van Mierlo
- Genres: Hip hop; R&B
- Occupations: Record producer; audio engineer; multi-instrumentalist
- Years active: 2011–present

Bryan van Mierlo, professionally known as Eestbound, is a Canadian record producer. He has produced songs for such artists as Travis Scott, Young Thug, Waka Flocka Flame, Lil Dicky, Young Dolph, Smoke DZA, and Sean Leon.

== Production discography ==
=== Charted song ===
Title	Year	Peak chart positions				Certifications	Album
Title	Year	US	AUS	BEL (FL)	CAN	Certifications	Album
"Antidote" (Travis Scott)	2015	16	75	38	120	RIAA: 4× Platinum; ARIA: Gold; RMNZ: Gold	Rodeo

== Production credits ==
=== 2015 ===
- Travis Scott – "Antidote" from Rodeo (produced with WondaGurl)
- Young Thug – "Freaky" from Slime Season (produced with WondaGurl)

=== 2016 ===
- Little Simz – "Bad to the Bone" (feat. Bibi Bourelly) from Stillness in Wonderland (produced with WondaGurl)
- FACE – "BLAZER"

=== 2017 ===
- Brain (Lil Dicky) – "Whippin’ It Up" from I'm Brain (produced with CuBeatz & OZ)
- Young Dolph – "All of Mine" (feat. DRAM) from Thinking Out Loud (produced with OZ)
- Sean Leon – "Vintage" from C.C.W.M.T.T (produced with Bijan Amir)
- Sean Leon – "81" from I Think You've Gone Mad (Or the Sins of the Father) (produced with Bijan Amir)
- Sean Leon – "905 9TO5" from I Think You've Gone Mad (Or the Sins of the Father)

=== 2018 ===
- 6ixBuzz – "Ah EE" (feat. K Money, Prince Dawn & Yung Tory) from 6ixupsidedown
- 6ixBuzz – "Don't Talk" (feat. Bizz Loc & Roney) from 6ixupsidedown (produced with GreezyBangerz & Jonah Zed)
- 6ixBuzz – "Porsche" (feat. Casper TNG & LB Spiffy) from 6ixupsidedown (produced with Jonah Zed)

=== 2019 ===
- Waka Flocka Flame – "Pumkin" (feat. Prince Ink) from Salute Me or Shoot Me 6 (produced with Josh Grant)

=== 2020 ===
- Smoke DZA – "Rules" (feat. Tish Hyman) from A Closed Mouth Don’t Get Fed
- L'One – "Золотой актив" (produced with DRTWRK)
- 6ixBuzz – "Prayers" (feat. Spadez) from NorthernSound (Deluxe)

=== 2021 ===
- L'One – "Я есть пламя" from Восход 1
