= I Know Too Much =

2026 studio album by Ellie Goulding

- Standard cover

Studio album by Ellie Goulding
- Released: 4 September 2026
- Recorded: c. 2023–2025
- Genre: Pop
- Length: 34:51
- Label: Polydor
- Producers: Dave Hamelin; Connor McDonough; Riley McDonough; Jack Rochon; Tyler Spry; Adam Yaron

Ellie Goulding chronology
Higher Than Heaven (2023)	I Know Too Much (2026)

Singles from I Know Too Much
- 1. "Black Prada Dress" Released: 5 June 2026; 2. "4 Seasons" Released: 31 July 2026; 3. "Ravers" Released: 5 August 2026; 4. "For Your Entertainment" Released: 4 September 2026

I Know Too Much is the sixth studio album by English singer-songwriter Ellie Goulding. It was released on 4 September 2026 through Polydor Records. During the album's development, Goulding wrote between 50 and 60 songs, drawing on her personal experiences and ideas from books and poetry.

I Know Too Much was shaped by Goulding's separation in 2024 from her former husband Caspar Jopling, and the personal changes that followed, including motherhood. Its songs explore relationships, emotional conflict, self-reflection, and new love, progressing from anger and darkness towards humour and optimism. Rooted in pop with classical and EDM influences, the album combines guitar-driven and acoustic elements.

I Know Too Much was preceded by four singles: "Black Prada Dress", "4 Seasons", "Ravers", and "For Your Entertainment", the latter of which was released alongside the album. Goulding released two alternate editions of I Know Too Much, titled We Know Too Much and You Know Too Much. Music critics praised Goulding's more personal songwriting and broader musical direction on the album, while some criticised its polished production for not always matching the emotional weight of its subject matter.

== Background and recording ==
In September 2024, Goulding shared that she was "working [her] way back slowly" while boxing and exercising, and added that it would "take a minute", while simultaneously focusing on creating new music. A subsequent clip showed her scrolling through multiple audio files on her phone, which appeared to be voice-note recordings labelled as new material. In an interview with The Sun on 1 December, Goulding revealed that she drew upon a "personal place" while writing songs for the album.

Goulding teased details about her next release in July 2025, writing that she had been working on new material for nearly two years. During this period, Goulding wrote down lines and ideas from books and poems that resonated with her before developing them into songs. She wrote around 50 to 60 songs for this project, some of which she ultimately decided were too sad to release.

== Composition ==
=== Music ===
Goulding confirmed that I Know Too Much would remain rooted in pop music—saying that she "can't help" making it—and described the album as featuring "guitars, bass, strings, harmonies for days, [and] the saddest words [she] ever wrote". She added: "I've made a classical album that's not out yet. I have a huge passion for classical music."

Mainly featuring pop melodies with elements of EDM, I Know Too Much incorporates guitar-driven and acoustic sounds, particularly on "For Your Entertainment" and "Loser". Jon Negroni of Slant Magazine contrasted the album with sounds of Goulding's second studio album, Halcyon (2012), saying that while her vocals had previously been paired with "harder musical elements", I Know Too Much generally places them within pop-oriented arrangements.

=== Lyrics and themes ===
I Know Too Much was shaped by Goulding's separation from her former husband Caspar Jopling in 2024. Although she did not initially intend to make a divorce-themed album, the writing increasingly reflected the end of her marriage and the changes that followed motherhood. Some of Goulding's friends even characterised the album as a "divorce album", but she said she viewed it more broadly as a record about "growing and rediscovery".

"Black Prada Dress"
Goulding described "Black Prada Dress" as "set[ting] the tone" for I Know Too Much, an album shaped by the aftermath of failed relationships and personal change.

According to her, I Know Too Much's lyrics include "observations" about her personal life, friendships, and connection with nature. They progress from anger and darkness to cynicism, humour and, eventually, excitement about a new relationship. Goulding said that "Black Prada Dress" "sets the tone" for the album, which she said came from the idea that "maybe we can know too much" and that "there is a certain kind of freedom in the ease of not knowing". Goulding described the album as a reflection of a period of personal transition, during which songwriting and studio work served as a form of refuge and therapy.

In I Know Too Much, Goulding explores themes surrounding failed relationships, emotional complexity, love, and its disappointments. She sings the lyrics "You can change all you want / You'll still feel like a loser" in "Loser", which is addressed to a former partner, while exploring the feelings of falling in love and the uncertainty of a temporary romance in "4 Seasons". "Misremember You" reflects on a past relationship through the lens of hindsight. Meanwhile, in "Jealousy", Goulding expresses a desire for intimacy without desperation, singing: "I want desire without the desperation."

=== Songs ===
"Black Prada Dress" is a pop and synth-pop song that combines elements of electronic and dance. "Jealousy" features loose bass and percussion beneath Goulding's self-assessment, while "Loser" incorporates K-pop-infused elements and focuses on a taunting chorus. In the acoustic ballad "4 Seasons", Goulding adopted an acoustic guitar, featuring an organic instrumentation with electronic sounds.

The lyric of "For Your Entertainment" depict a relationship in which the narrator is willing to sacrifice herself for another person, while the pre-chorus acknowledges the potentially harmful nature of that devotion. "Misremember You" explores the idea of rewriting a former relationship in hindsight and acknowledges Goulding's own role in reshaping an unpleasant past. Built around a four-on-the-floor rhythm with Goulding occasionally using falsetto, "Ravers" is a house, dance, and club-oriented electronic song. Its lyrics describe the narrator's willingness to sacrifice herself for another person.

== Promotion and release ==
Goulding has given fans an update on her then upcoming sixth studio album since 2024, saying that her previous record Higher Than Heaven (2023) was created "intentionally impersonal", while her new album is "little different" from it. In 2026, Goulding began teasing the album's lead single, sharing a video with a caption "only you could call me trashy in my black Prada dress". On 23 May, she debuted the song, titled "Black Prada Dress", on BBC Radio 1's Big Weekend at Herrington Country Park. Goulding revealed her sixth studio album I Know Too Much's album cover and title on 2 June, and released "Black Prada Dress" three days later. Goulding performed the song on 7 June, with English pianist Jools Holland on BBC Two, along with a brand-new track "4 Seasons". During the album's roll-out, she shared previews of the songs, including "Loser" and "I Know Too Much".

"4 Seasons" followed on 31 July, serving as the second single. On 5 August, the third single "Ravers" was released; its music video was directed by Sean Price Williams and premiered two days later. Ahead of the album's release, Goulding announced five intimate UK launch shows in Kingston, Southampton, Bristol, Liverpool, and Manchester, held between 31 August and 7 September. The fourth single "For Your Entertainment" was released on 4 September, along with the album. (Note: Although there is no mention of "single", Billboard article listed "For Your Entertainment" in their "New Music Friday Guide" on 4 September, while the album's press release referred to it as a "focus track".) Composed of ten tracks, I Know Too Much was released through Polydor Records, to cassette, CD, digital, streaming, and vinyl. The deluxe edition titled We Know Too Much was released two days later to digital and streaming, featuring six additional songs. On 11 September, Goulding exclusively re-released the album again under the title You Know Too Much to digital and streaming, including her 2025 single "Destiny" and five acoustic versions of "Black Prada Dress", "4 Seasons", "For Your Entertainment", "Destiny", and "Always Think of You".

== Commercial performance ==
I Know Too Much opened the UK Albums Chart at number 16 with first-week sales of 5,273 units, becoming Goulding's first studio album not to peak in the top three. It also debuted at number 16 in Scotland, while peaking the top 20 in Belgium's Flanders, top 40 in Germany and Belgium's Wallonia, and top 50 in Switzerland.. The album did not chart on the US Billboard 200.

== Critical reception ==
Professional ratings
Review scores
Source	Rating
AllMusic	3.5/5 stars
Jenesaispop	7.5/10
Musikexpress	4/5 stars
Rolling Stone Germany	3.5/5 stars
Slant Magazine	2.5/5 stars
Stereoboard	4/5 stars
The Times	3/5 stars

Critics differed in their assessment of I Know Too Much's shift towards more personal and introspective songwriting. Writing for AllMusic, Neil Z. Yeung praised the album's variety and its movement away from the "mainstream pop" and "festival EDM" styles of Goulding's recent work. Issy Herring of Stereoboard contrasted the record's focus on failed relationships and emotional turmoil with Higher Than Heaven's more escapist approach, while praising its combination of emotional depth with pop melodies. Oor's Randy Timmers similarly welcomed Goulding's return to a less beat-driven form of pop and compared the album at its best to Carly Rae Jepsen's 2015 album Emotion. Jenesaispop author Sebas E. Alonso regarded I Know Too Much as Goulding's most confessional work to date, while Frank Lähnemann of Rolling Stone Germany praised her renewed focus on traditional songwriting and called it her best album. Musikexpress's Aida Baghernejad contrasted the album's focus on failed relationships and emotional turmoil with the different musical styles Goulding has explored throughout her career.

I Know Too Much's treatment of relationships and emotional conflict received particular attention. Alonso highlighted the bitterness and toxicity of songs such as "Jealousy" and "Loser", while Will Hodgkinson of The Times found Goulding more emotionally affecting than before in tracks like "Loser". Slant Magazine's Jon Negroni likewise identified failed relationships, self-deception, and desire as recurring themes, but felt that the songs did not always sustain the complexity of those ideas. Yeung, by contrast, viewed the album's exploration of relationship drama and complicated emotions as a return to Goulding's "introspective side".

Production and vocals drew more divided responses. Lähnemann praised Goulding's voice and the contribution of Rochon, while Timmers singled out the layered vocals on "Nobody Dances" and the arrangement of "Loser". Negroni felt that Rochon's airy synths, crisp electronic drums and uncluttered production often resulted in "frictionless pop", which he considered less effective when set against the album's emotional subject matter. Hodgkinson similarly felt that the music relied too heavily on conventional pop and earnest balladry despite the strength of Goulding's performances.

Individual tracks received particular attention for their production and emotional qualities. Yeung highlighted the stylistic variety of the title track and its departure from Goulding's established dance-oriented sound. Lyndsey Heavens of Billboard and Negroni highlighted "For Your Entertainment", noting its lyrics about the emotional toll of performing and its intensifying production. Baghernejad highlighted "Always Think of You" and "Loser" as examples of Goulding's more direct songwriting, while praising the latter as a standout track. Timmers and Herring praised "Ravers" for its electro-pop and club-oriented melody, with Herring viewing its placement as the album's closing track as indicative of Goulding's more personal and thought-provoking songwriting.

== Track listing ==
I Know Too Much track listing
No.	Title	Writer(s)	Producer(s)	Length
1.	"Black Prada Dress"	Ellie Goulding; Evan Blair; James Essein; Jack Rochon	Rochon; Calum Landau^{[v]}	3:18
2.	"Jealousy"	Goulding; Scott Harris; Madison Love; Connor McDonough; Riley McDonough; Rochon	C. McDonough^{[p]}; R. McDonough; Rochon	3:01
3.	"Loser"	Goulding; Steph Jones; Kiddo A.I.; C. McDonough; R. McDonough; Rochon; Jake Torrey	C. McDonough^{[p]}; R. McDonough; Rochon; Jones^{[v]}	3:28
4.	"4 Seasons"	Goulding; Jon Birondo; Kiddo A.I.; Rochon; Tyler Spry	Rochon; Spry^{[p]}; Landau^{[v]}	3:37
5.	"Nobody Dances"	Goulding; Mags Duval; Adam Yaron	Yaron^{[p]}	3:04
6.	"Always Think of You"	Goulding; Duval; Torrey; Yaron	Rochon; Yaron; Landau^{[v]}	3:06
7.	"For Your Entertainment"	Goulding; Jones; Kiddo A.I.; C. McDonough; R. McDonough; Rochon; Torrey	C. McDonough^{[p]}; R. McDonough; Rochon; Jones^{[v]}	3:53
8.	"Misremember You"	Goulding; Ines Dunn; Duval; Rochon; Matt Zara	Rochon; Zara^{[a]}; Dunn^{[v]}; Duval^{[v]}; Landau^{[v]}	3:51
9.	"I Know Too Much"	Goulding; Aaron Paris; Rochon	Rochon; Landau^{[v]}	4:07
10.	"Ravers"	Goulding; Sophie Cates; Dave Hamelin; Rochon; Sarah Solovay	Hamelin; Rochon	3:26
Total length:				34:51

We Know Too Much track listing
No.	Title	Writer(s)	Producer(s)	Length
11.	"Nice Things"	Goulding; Rochon	Rochon; Landau^{[v]}	2:49
12.	"Sweet Delusion"	Goulding; Rochon	Rochon	3:50
13.	"Right Hand"	Noah Conrad; Jack Bowman; Goulding; Rochon	Rochon; Conrad^{[v]}; Landau^{[v]}	1:49
14.	"All the Time"	Goulding; Rochon	Rochon; Landau^{[v]}	1:09
15.	"Fields of Love"	Hamelin; Goulding; Rochon; Feist	Hamelin; Rochon; Landau^{[v]}	3:22
16.	"Ways to Hurt"	Mike Dean; Goulding; Rochon	Dean; Landau	4:27
Total length:				52:18

You Know Too Much track listing
No.	Title	Writer(s)	Producer(s)	Length
17.	"Destiny"	Goulding; Rochon; Kurtis Wells; Livvi Franc	Rochon; Wells	4:37
18.	"Black Prada Dress" (acoustic)	Goulding; Blair; Rochon; Essien	Landau; Rochon	3:30
19.	"4 Seasons" (acoustic)	Goulding; Rochon; Byron; A.I.; Spry	Rochon; Spry	3:29
20.	"Always Think of You" (acoustic)	Yaron; Goulding; Torrey; Duval	Yaron; Rochon	3:09
21.	"For Your Entertainment" (acoustic)	C. McDonough; Goulding; Rochon; Torrey; A.I.; R. McDonough; Jones	C. McDonough; Rochon; R. McDonough	3:49
22.	"Destiny" (acoustic)	Goulding; Rochon; Wells; Franc	Rochon; Wells	4:35
Total length:				75:27

=== Notes ===
- ^{^[p]} signifies a producer and vocal producer.
- ^{^[a]} signifies an additional producer.
- ^{^[v]} signifies a vocal producer.
- The acoustic version of "4 Seasons" was listed as "Four Seasons" on Goulding's website.
- The acoustic version of "Always Think of You" was listed as the closing track of You Know Too Much on Goulding's website.
- "Ravers" contains samples from "Kalimankou Denkou (The Evening Gathering)" (1975), performed by the Bulgarian State Radio & Television Female Vocal Choir.

== Personnel ==
Credits are adapted from Tidal.

- Ellie Goulding – vocals
- Randy Merrill – mastering
- Jack Rochon – synthesiser (tracks 1, 2, 6, 8, 9), piano (1, 4, 8, 10), guitars (3, 6–9), bass (3, 7, 8), organ (7, 8); drums, pedal steel guitar (8)
- Calum Landau – engineering (1–4, 7–9), vocal engineering (2, 3)
- Mark "Spike" Stent – mixing (1–4, 6–9)
- Antonio Tucci Jr. – engineering (1–3, 7)
- Aaron Paris – violin (1, 2, 4, 8, 9), string arrangement (9)
- Aalia Prince – choir vocals (1, 5)
- Cherice Voncelle – choir vocals (1, 5)
- Desrine Ewart – choir vocals (1, 5)
- Jabez Walsh – choir vocals (1, 5)
- Joel Bailey – choir vocals (1, 5)
- Michael Yakubu – choir vocals (1, 5)
- Nyasha Mutsonziwa – choir vocals (1, 5)
- Rhyanne Woodbine – choir vocals (1, 5)
- Shanice Kudita – choir vocals (1, 5)
- Tanisha Walters – choir vocals (1, 5)
- Tehiillah Ediri – choir vocals (1, 5)
- Todd Lombardo – acoustic guitar (4)
- Tyler Spry – acoustic guitar, guitars, Omnichord (4)
- Adam Yaron – background vocals (5, 6), engineering (5); bass, guitars, Omnichord (6)
- Mags Duval – background vocals (5, 6)
- Serban Ghenea – mixing (5)
- Jake Torrey – background vocals (6)
- Nick Lee – saxophone, trombone (8)
- Brendon Thomas – cello (9)
- Calum Landau – programming (9)
- Dave Hamelin – programming, synthesiser (10)
- Jeremy Wheatley – mixing (10)

== Charts ==
Chart performance
Chart (2026)	Peak position
Belgian Albums (Ultratop Flanders)	20
Belgian Albums (Ultratop Wallonia)	33
French Physical Albums (SNEP)	134
German Albums (Offizielle Top 100)	37
German Pop Albums (Offizielle Top 100)	20
Scottish Albums (Official Charts)	16
Swiss Albums (Schweizer Hitparade)	50
Spanish Vinyl Albums (Promusicae)	84
UK Albums (Official Charts)	16

== Release history ==
Release dates and formats
Region	Date	Format(s)	Version	Label	Ref.
Various	4 September 2026	Cassette; CD; digital download; streaming; vinyl	Standard	Polydor	
Various	6 September 2026	Digital download; streaming	Deluxe	Polydor	
Various	11 September 2026	Digital download; streaming	Exclusive Bonus	Polydor	
