= Save My Love (song) =

Single by Marshmello, Ellie Goulding and Avaion
- Released: June 6, 2025
- Genre: Dance
- Length: 3:35
- Label: Joytime Collective; Interscope; Polydor
- Songwriters: Marshmello; Ellie Goulding; Gray Hawken; Jake Torrey; Connor McDonough; Riley McDonough
- Producers: Marshmello; Avaion; TK; Connor McDonough

Marshmello singles chronology
"Worlds Apart" (2025)	"Save My Love" (2025)	"Bassline Flexa" (2025)

Ellie Goulding singles chronology
"Hypnotized" (2025)	"Save My Love" (2025)	"Destiny" (2025)

Avaion singles chronology
"Can't Find You" (2025)	"Save My Love" (2025)	"Slowly" (2025)

Visualizer
- "Save My Love" on YouTube

"Save My Love" is a song by American DJ Marshmello, English singer-songwriter Ellie Goulding, and German electronic musician Avaion. It was released on June 6, 2025, under Joytime Collective, with exclusive license to Interscope, and Polydor Records. The song was written by Marshmello, Goulding, Connor and Riley McDonough, with Jake Torrey, and Gray Hawken, and it was produced by Marshmello, Avaion, with Connor McDonough and TK.

== Background and promotion ==
"Save My Love" marks the first official collaboration between the three artists, although Marshmello had previously remixed Goulding's single "Outside" during the early stages of his career, which in an interview on the podcast Behind the Wall with Daniel Wall, he credited the remix as the one that changed his life. Goulding confirmed in an interview with Heart in 2022, that she and Marshmello have been working in the studio. On May 28, Marshmello announced the release date with the song pre-order link. During the release week, each artist shared a little message with their followers on social media about the collaboration, with Marshmello saying "this one means a lot." On June 3, Avaion posted an old concert ticket on Instagram from a Marshmello show, which was his first ever concert, highlighting how meaningful the collaboration was for him.

"I've kept the ticket of the first show I've ever been to in my wallet. Now I'm releasing a song with him and the amazing @elliegoulding on Friday. Keep dreaming ma friends. "Save my love" out this Friday!"

— Avaion on working with Marshmello and Goulding, via Instagram

On October 18, two official remixes were released, one by DJ Nicky Romero and the other by Kaidro.

== Music video ==
An official visualizer directed by Ian Lipton, which was filmed in Los Angeles, was released alongside the song on June 6. It features Goulding and Marshmello portraying a distant couple staying in a beach house.

== Reception ==
"Save My Love" was met with positive reviews from electronic music oulets and music critics, who praised Goulding's emotional vocal delivery and the DJs' House-driven production, as well the vulnerability and evocative lyrical content. Rolling Stone added the track on their "Songs You Need to Know" list which includes the best releases of the week.

== Track listing ==
- Digital download and streaming
1. "Save My Love" – 3:35
- Digital download and streaming – Remixes
1. "Save My Love" (Nicky Romero remix) – 3:48
2. "Save My Love" (Kaidro remix) – 3:28

== Personnel ==
Credits were adapted from Apple Music.

- Marshmello – performer, songwriter, producer
- Ellie Goulding – vocals, songwriter
- Avaion – performer, producer
- Jake Torrey – songwriter
- Connor McDonough – songwriter, producer
- Riley McDonough – songwriter
- Gray Hawken – songwriter
- TK – producer
- Tom Norris – mixing engineer

== Charts ==
=== Weekly charts ===
Weekly chart performance
Chart (2025–2026)	Peak position
Central America Anglo Airplay (Monitor Latino)	9
Guatemala Anglo Airplay (Monitor Latino)	4
Honduras Anglo Airplay (Monitor Latino)	1
Hungary (Rádiós Top 40)	26
Latvia Airplay (TopHit)	47
Lithuania Airplay (TopHit)	25
New Zealand Hot Singles (RMNZ)	19
Nicaragua Anglo Airplay (Monitor Latino)	5
Paraguay Anglo Airplay (Monitor Latino)	6
Poland (Polish Airplay Top 100)	4
Slovakia Airplay (ČNS IFPI)	3
US Dance Digital Song Sales (Billboard)	14
US Dance/Mix Show Airplay (Billboard)	2
US Hot Dance/Electronic Songs (Billboard)	5
Venezuela Anglo Airplay (Monitor Latino)	1

=== Monthly charts ===
Monthly chart performance
Chart (2025)	Peak position
Latvia Airplay (TopHit)	51
Lithuania Airplay (TopHit)	43

=== Year-end charts ===
Year-end chart performance
Chart (2025)	Position
Poland (Polish Airplay Top 100)	38
US Hot Dance/Electronic Songs (Billboard)	42
US Dance/Mix Show Airplay Songs (Billboard)	12

== Release history ==
Release dates and formats
Region	Date	Format	Label	Ref.
Various	June 6, 2025	Digital download; streaming	Joytime Collective; Interscope; Polydor	
Various	October 17, 2025	Digital download; streaming	Joytime Collective; Interscope; Polydor	
