= I Think You've Gone Mad (Or the Sins of the Father) =

Studio album by Sean Leon
- Released: February 5, 2017
- Genre: Hip hop; alternative rock; trap
- Length: 1:16:06
- Label: The IXXI Initiative
- Producer: Sean Leon; WondaGurl; Eestbound; Jack Rochon; Jordan Evans; J'vell Boyce; Daniel Caesar; Jovi; MADEAT2AM; Bijan Amir; Cubeatz; Zepfire; Yogi

Sean Leon chronology
King of the Wild Things (2014)	I Think You've Gone Mad (Or the Sins of the Father) (2017)	C.C.W.M.T.T. (2017)

Singles from I Think You've Gone Mad (Or the Sins of the Father)
- 1. "81" Released: November 5, 2015; 2. "Europe Freestyle / I Made It / Debt & Vendettas" Released: March 25, 2016; 3. "Deep End" Released: April 7, 2016; 4. "Matthew In The Middle" Released: April 15, 2016; 5. "Killin' Mind" Released: April 20, 2016; 6. "Fav Rapper / Hundred Million Religion" Released: December 11, 2016

I Think You've Gone Mad (Or the Sins of the Father) is the debut studio album by Toronto rapper and producer Sean Leon. It was released by The IXXI Initiative on February 5, 2017. The album also features collaborations with Daniel Caesar and the deceased Canadian rapper Redway. It was produced by Leon and many producers, such as WondaGurl, Eestbound, Jordan Evans and others.

The album received generally positive reviews from critics. The album was supported by six singles, "81", "Europe Freestyle / I Made It / Debt & Vendettas (featuring Savannah Ré)", "Deep End", "Matthew in The Middle (featuring Daniel Caesar)", "Killin' Mind" and "Fav Rapper / Hundred Million Religion"

== Music and lyrics ==
I Think You've Gone Mad (Or the Sins of the Father) contains lyrics about complicated relationships and trust issues with family, depression about his brother's imprisonment in his song "Matthew in The Middle" featuring Daniel Caesar, which was also featured on the compilation of the TV series Insecure. Here, Leon raps We ain't talk much since '99 / We have problems, 99 / "I'm comin' home", I know he lyin' / But that's my brother, so that was fine. In the album, Sean also shares his journey and express deeply about his daughter Xylo on the song "Xylo's Lullaby / Sweet Girls Always Fall for the Monsters". You know what they gon' say bout Daddy / You know that's-, "It ain't true" / Don't be terrified / I'll be fighting till the day I die, don't be terrified says Matthew.

== Track listing ==
No.	Title	Writer(s)	Producer(s)	Length
1.	"Daughter (Hailey-Nirvana)"	Matthew Leon	Sean Leon; WondaGurl	4:20
2.	"God / Guard Up"	Leon	WondaGurl	2:51
3.	"Deep End (Off The)"	Leon	WondaGurl	4:14
4.	"905 9TO5"	Leon	Eestbound	4:41
5.	"Suburbia (Heaven Or)"	Leon	Sean Leon; Jack Rochon	2:22
6.	"Matthew In The Middle" (featuring Daniel Caesar)	Leon; Ashton Simmonds	Sean Leon; Jack Rochon	5:41
7.	"Win"	Leon	WondaGurl; Sean Leon; Jack Rochon	4:22
8.	"Kill My Mind"	Leon	Sean Leon; WondaGurl; MADEAT2AM; Jack Rochon	5:52
9.	"81" (Prequel)	Leon	Bijan Amir	1:55
10.	"81"	Leon	Eestbound	2:10
11.	"Favourite Rapper / Hundred Million Religion"	Leon	Bijan Amir	3:28
12.	"BLK PNK MF'ER / Me & My Bitch"	Leon; Tania Peralta	Jordan Evans; J'vell Boyce; Sean Leon	2:47
13.	"Sins of the Father (100 Bitches)"	Leon	WondaGurl; Zepfire	3:09
14.	"Black Sheep Nirvana"	Leon	WondaGurl; Jack Rochon; Sean Leon	5:12
15.	"Xylo's Lullaby / Sweet Girls Always Fall for the Monsters"	Leon	Sean Leon; J'vell Boyce; Jack Rochon	2:39
16.	"I Made It / Debt & Vendettas / Summer Now"	Leon	Yogi; Sean Leon; Jack Rochon	4:06
17.	"Hey Pretty Girl with the Dirty Mouth II"	Leon	Jack Rochon; Jordan Evans; Sean Leon	2:48
18.	"Salt Lake City"	Leon	Jack Rochon; Sean Leon	3:48
19.	"Redway's Song" (featuring Redway)	Leon; Shane Redway	WondaGurl; Jack Rochon	5:29
20.	"The Drowning Man"	Leon	J'vell Boyce; Daniel Caesar; Jack Rochon; Sean Leon	5:20
Total length:				1:16:06

Sample credits

- "Daughter (Hailey-Nirvana)" and "The Drowning Man" contains a sample of "Que Le Den Candela" by Celia Cruz
- "Matthew In The Middle" contains a sample of "Devil in a New Dress" by Kanye West, featuring Rick Ross.
- "Win" contains vocals of "Waves" by River Tiber.
- "Hey Pretty Girl with the Dirty Mouth II" contains a sample of "Knocked Up" by Kings Of Leon.

== Personnel ==
Album credits adapted from SoundCloud.

Musicians

- Sean Leon - Vocals, production and sequencing
- Daniel Caesar – Vocals (track 5, 6, 20)
- Rachel Piscione – Additional Vocals (tracks 1, 7)
- Jack Rochon – Harmonizer (track 2, 14) Guitar (tracks 7, 8, 16, 17, 18)
- Jordan Evans - Production (tracks 6, 15, 17, 20)
- Jordan Fall - Sequencing (tracks 4)
- WondaGurl – Production (track 1, 2, 3, 7, 8, 13, 14, 19)
- Eestbound – Production (tracks 4, 10)
- Ethan “SPYDER” Ashby - Sequencing (tracks 5) Additional Production (tracks 9)
- a l l i e – Additional Vocals (tracks 8)
- Bijan Amir - Production (tracks 9, 11)
- Ben Foran - Guitar (tracks 12, 15)
- Dragan Maricic - Guitar (tracks 12)
- Austin Jones - Trumpet (tracks 14)
- Aaron Cheung - Violin (tracks 14, 18)
- Yogi - Production (tracks 16)
- Redway - Vocals (tracks 19)
- J'vell Boyce - Production (tracks 6, 12, 15) Drums (tracks 20)
- Julien Bowry - Additional Vocals (tracks 19)
- MADEAT2AM - Production (tracks 8)
- Tania Peralta - Additional Vocals (tracks 12)
