= C.C.W.M.T.T. =

Studio album by Sean Leon
- Released: November 29, 2017
- Genre: Hip hop; electronic; trap
- Length: 35:24
- Label: The IXXI Initiative
- Producer: Sean Leon; Bijan Amir; Jack Rochon; WondaGurl; Eestbound; FrancisGotHeat; Jandre Amos; LUHJÉ; MADEAT2AM; TAIYIM

Sean Leon chronology
I Think You've Gone Mad (Or the Sins of the Father) (2017)	C.C.W.M.T.T. (2017)	Sean Leon (The Death Of) (2018)

Singles from C.C.W.M.T.T.
- 1. "Gold" Released: August 2, 2017; 2. "Vintage" Released: September 28, 2017

Professional ratings
Review scores
Source	Rating
Exclaim!	8/10

C.C.W.M.T.T (abbreviated as Can't Come with Me This Time) is the second studio album by Canadian rapper and producer Sean Leon. It was released as an audio-film and an album on November 29, 2017. The album was supported by two singles, "Gold" and "Vintage".

== Background ==
On September 24, 2017, Leon released a track titled "Vintage" as the first single of a supposed upcoming extended play titled I Can See a Blue Sky from Here. "Vintage" had previously been included in a short film released on YouTube by Leon titled Life When You're the Movie, as early as December 21, 2016, when its first trailer was released.

In an interview with The Fader, Leon said about the album:

I been workin’ on that one for so long. I actually started working on it before I Think You’ve Gone Mad came out. It’s one of those projects that I just take forever on, because it’s so cinematic to me. I was like, "Man, I gotta make other albums while I’m doing this." So I took a break from it and I made two albums that I like since then. One of them is King & Sufferin.

== Track listing ==
No.	Title	Writer(s)	Producer(s)	Length
1.	"Parkdale Cartel Freestyle II"	Matthew Leon	Jack Rochon; Bijan Amir	2:12
2.	"Turf"	Leon	Eestbound; LUHJÉ	2:33
3.	"Gold"	Leon	FrancisGotHeat; WondaGurl	2:58
4.	"Vintage"	Leon	Eestbound; Bijan Amir	2:02
5.	"The Rat Race"	Leon	Jack Rochon; Bijan Amir	2:48
6.	"King St. W"	Leon	Sean Leon	3:37
7.	"Laying Low (Cooking Up)"	Leon	Jack Rochon; Bijan Amir	3:49
8.	"Before I Leave I Tried"	Leon	Sean Leon	0:39
9.	"2017"	Leon	Jack Rochon; Jandre Amos	3:25
10.	"25 & Whyln"	Leon; Bijan Amirkhani	Jandre Amos; Jack Rochon; Bijan Amir; WondaGurl; MADEAT2AM; TAIYIM; Sean Leon	11:18
Total length:				35:24

Notes

- "Parkdale Cartel Freestyle II", "King St. W", "2017" and "25 & Whylin" contains vocals from Bijan Amir.
- "25 & Whyln" includes "Steve Harvey / Family Feud" and "Hollywood Tarantino Flow", performed by Sean Leon, and contains vocals from A L L I E.

== Personnel ==
- Sean Leon - Vocals, executive production and production
- Jack Rochon - Production
- WondaGurl - Production
- Eestbound - Production
- Bijan Amir - Vocals and production
- TAIYIM - Production
- MADEAT2AM - Production
- LUHJÉ - Production
- FrancisGotHeat - Production
- Jandre Amos - Additional production
- Luis Mora - Photography
- Lila - Photography
- Niko Nice - Photography
- Ethan “SPYDER” Ashby - Engineer
- Jordan Evans - Additional production
