= In Loving Memory (Sean Leon album) =

Studio album by Sean Leon
- Released: December 1, 2023
- Genre: Alternative; hip hop; neo-soul; R&B; gospel
- Length: 36:31; 53:50 (Plus edition)
- Label: Self-released
- Producer: Sean Leon; Aaron Paris; Alex Ernewein; Ashton Mills; Akeel Henry; Alessandro Buccellati; Bijan Amir; Brandon Leger; Chris K; Damian Birdsey; Kanye West; Jack Rochon; Janoya; Leonardo Dessi; Loubenski; Luca; Monomite; Rob Bisel; Sacha Rudy; Teddy Fantum; Thabbo; Yogi

Sean Leon chronology
Sean Leon (The Death Of)	In Loving Memory

Alternative cover

Singles from In Loving Memory
- 1. "Blood" Released: May 5, 2023; 2. "The Glade" Released: June 23, 2023; 3. "Aquarius" Released: August 4, 2019; 4. "Equinox" Released: August 23, 2023; 5. "Gravity" Released: September 29, 2023

In Loving Memory is the fourth studio album by Canadian rapper and producer Sean Leon. It was released independently on December 1, 2023. It features guest appearances from Ye, Daniel Caesar, Jessie Reyez, River Tiber, and Dylan Sinclair. It also serves as the soundtrack to the short film, "House of Leon", directed by Rohan Blair-Mangat.

The album was a long listed nominee for the 2024 Polaris Music Prize.

The deluxe edition was released on December 6, 2024, containing eight additional songs.

== Background and promotion ==
In 2019, Leon and Ye were connected through one of Ye's Sunday Service performances. While working on Daniel Caesar's sophomore album, Case Study 01, fellow collaborator River Tiber recommended Leon to share a demo called "The Glade" with Ye, which would, in turn, become "Up From The Ashes". Leon would end up writing, producing, and providing reference tracks for Jesus is King, Donda, and Donda 2, with the latter album including an early version of "Oxygen", then called, "Sci Fi".

The short film trailer was released on social media on November 21, 2021.

On August 29, 2023, a compilation EP containing all the previously released singles was released.

== Themes and lyrics ==
In Loving Memory is dedicated to Leon's brother and fellow hip-hop artist, Stefan “Kingsley” Leon. Leon said this about the album regarding themes of his brother: "I wish this growth (in me) hadn’t come at the expense of something so final but, finally, the time has come where we’re forced to say goodbye for now. Until I see you again. Rest in paradise."

== Track listing ==
In Loving Memory tracklisting
No.	Title	Writer(s)	Producer(s)	Length
1.	"In Loving Memory"	Matthew Sean Leon	Matthew Sean Leon	0:36
2.	"Gravity"	Matthew Sean Leon	Akeel Henry; Alex Ernewein; Brandon Leger; Cvre; Matthew Sean Leon	2:28
3.	"Blood"	Matthew Sean Leon	Janoya; Loubenski; Matthew Sean Leon; Monomite	2:01
4.	"Memories (Reprise)"	Matthew Sean Leon	Matthew Sean Leon; Tommy Paxton-Beesley	1:23
5.	"Transition"	Matthew Sean Leon	Matthew Sean Leon	0:03
6.	"Aquarius"	Matthew Sean Leon	Ashton Mills; Jack Rochon; Matthew Sean Leon	3:55
7.	"Transition, Again"	Matthew Sean Leon	Matthew Sean Leon; Teddy Fantum; Thabbo	0:45
8.	"The Glade"	Ashton Simmonds; Matthew Sean Leon	Alex Ernewein; Matthew Sean Leon	3:42
9.	"Equinox"	Alex Ernewein; Bijan Amir; Matthew Sean Leon	Matthew Sean Leon	6:43
10.	"Dishonored"	Jessie Reyez; Matthew Sean Leon	Aaron Paris; Jack Rochon; Leo Dessi; Matthew Sean Leon	2:43
11.	"Oxygen"	Matthew Sean Leon; Ye	905LUCA; Aaron Paris; Cvre; Leo Dessi; Matthew Sean Leon	3:34
12.	"Kingsley's Outro"	Matthew Sean Leon	Aaron Paris; Matthew Sean Leon; YogiTheProducer	4:27
13.	"Memories"	Ashton Simmonds; Dylan Sinclair; Matthew Sean Leon	Alex Ernewein; Damian Birdsey; Matthew Sean Leon; Sacha Rudy	2:26
14.	"Alive"	Matthew Sean Leon	Alessandro Buccella; Matthew Sean Leon; Rob Bisel	1:38
Total length:				36:31

Plus edition
No.	Title	Writer(s)	Producer(s)	Length
1.	"(Start)"	Matthew Sean Leon	Matthew Sean Leon	0:26
2.	"Does It Hurt?"	Dylan Sinclair; Matthew Sean Leon	Damian Birdseye; Tommy Paxton-Beesly	3:20
3.	"(How To Live When You Want To Die)"	Matthew Sean Leon	Matthew Sean Leon	0:45
4.	"You Don't Know Me Anymore"	Ashton Mills	Matthew Sean Leon	0:54
5.	"Grey Skies"	Bijan Amir; Harrison Robinson; Matthew Sean Leon	Bijan Amir; Harrison; Matthew Sean Leon	2:38
6.	"Heart Rate"	Harrison Robinson; Matthew Sean Leon	Harrison; Matthew Sean Leon	2:03
7.	"Rhyan's Hymn"	Rhyan Douglas	Alex Ernewein; Eli Brown	4:58
8.	"Matthew"	Matthew Sean Leon	Alex Ernewein, Matthew Sean Leon	2:11
Total length:				17:15
