= Jay Jopling =

English art dealer (born 1963)

The Honourable Jay Jopling
- Born: Jeremy Michael Jopling; June 1963 (age 63); Thirsk, Yorkshire
- Education: Eton College
- Alma mater: University of Edinburgh
- Occupations: Art dealer Gallerist
- Spouses: Sam Taylor-Wood (m. 1997; div. 2008): Hikari Yokoyama
- Children: 3
- Father: Michael Jopling, Baron Jopling
- Relatives: Caspar Jopling (nephew)

Jeremy Michael "Jay" Jopling (born June 1963) is an English art dealer and gallerist. He is the founder of International contemporary art gallery White Cube.

== Early life ==
Jeremy Michael Jopling is the son of Michael Jopling, Baron Jopling, a Conservative politician who served for some time as Minister for Agriculture in the Conservative Government led by Margaret Thatcher. Jopling was brought up in Yorkshire and educated at Eton and the University of Edinburgh, where he studied English literature and history of art, and his first job was selling fire extinguishers door-to-door.

== Career ==
As a university student, Jopling visited Manhattan, where he forged links with post-war American artists, encouraging them to donate works for the charity auction "New Art: New World." In the late 1980s, he formed a friendship with the artist Damien Hirst. After completing his M.A. in 1984, he moved to London and began working with artists of his generation.

In May 1993, he opened the original White Cube on the first floor of 44 Duke Street, St James, in West End. Its exhibition policy was to provide a one-off showcase for both British and international artists. White Cube exhibited some of the leading contemporary artists, including Lucian Freud, Gilbert & George, Antony Gormley, Sarah Morris, Mona Hatoum, Marc Quinn, Damien Hirst, Gary Hume, Runa Islam, Jake & Dinos Chapman, Tracey Emin, Harland Miller, Sam Taylor-Wood, Gavin Turk and Cerith Wyn Evans.

In 2000, Jopling opened the larger White Cube Hoxton Square in London's East End, occupying a converted 1920s light industrial building. The gallery space closed in December 2012. White Cube Mason's Yard, situated off Duke Street, St James's—home of the original White Cube—opened in 2006. White Cube Bermondsey opened in October 2012 and is the largest of the gallery's three sites. White Cube Hong Kong, located in the heart of Hong Kong's central district, opened in March 2012. White Cube São Paulo opened in December 2012 and closed in 2015. He was named one of GQ's 50 best dressed British men in 2015.

== Paddle8 ==
Jopling invested heavily in an online auction platform called Paddle8. Paddle8 merged with competitor online auction house Auctionata in early 2016. By February 2017, Auctionata declared insolvency and Paddle8 became an independent company once again.

== Personal life ==
Jopling was married to artist Sam Taylor-Wood; together they have two daughters, Angelica (b. June 1997) and Jessie Phoenix (b. November 2005). In September 2008, the couple announced that they were separating amicably after 11 years of marriage. He subsequently married Hikari Yokoyama, who works for Paddle8. In 2019, their daughter, Djuna Mei Jopling, was born.
