= Caspar Jopling =

British art dealer

- Born: Caspar William Jopling; 10 January 1992 (age 34); Yorkshire, England
- Education: Harvard University (BA); University of Oxford (MBA)
- Occupations: Art dealer; strategic gallery executive
- Spouse: Ellie Goulding (m. 2019; sep. 2024)
- Partner: Olivia Wilde (2024–present)
- Children: 1
- Parents: Hon Nicholas Jopling; Jayne Warde-Adam
- Relatives: Michael Jopling (grandfather); Tamara Meade (sister); Jay Jopling (uncle); Charles Andrew Warde-Aldam (stepfather)

Caspar William Jopling (born 10 January 1992) is a British art dealer, and strategic gallery executive. Jopling comes from a minor British aristocratic family with connections to politics and the arts. He rose to prominence through his marriage to English pop icon Ellie Goulding, their relationship and subsequent separation received extensive coverage from the British and international media.

As 2026, Jopling currently serves as the director of the contemporary art gallery White Cube.

== Early life and education ==
Caspar William Jopling was born on 10 January 1992 in Yorkshire, England, to Jayne Warde-Aldam and the Honorable Nicholas Jopling of Yorkshire, his parents have aristocratic ties as the family owns Frickley Hall. He has a stepfather, Charles Andrew Warde-Aldam. Jopling is the grandson of politician Michael Jopling, who was part of the Conservative Party and served as a Member of Parliament. He's also the nephew of the art dealer, Jay Jopling, and the brother of Emmy Award-winning makeup artist Tamara Meade.

Jopling was educated at Eton College, an independent boarding school in Berkshire. He subsequently attended Harvard University, where he studied History of Art and Architecture and Film Studies, graduating in 2014. Jopling was also a competitive rower. He represented Great Britain at the 2010 Summer Youth Olympic Games and competed in rowing during his university years.

== Career ==
Jopling began his career in the art market with an internship at Christie's. He subsequently joined Sotheby's in New York, where he worked in corporate development and strategy, with a focus on contemporary art. During this period, he also contributed art reviews to The Huffington Post as a contemporary art writer.

He later completed a Master of Business Administration (MBA) at the Saïd Business School at the University of Oxford. In September 2021, Jopling joined White Cube, a contemporary art gallery founded by his uncle, Jay Jopling. He has held a strategic and management role at the gallery.

== Personal life ==
Jopling began dating singer-songwriter Ellie Goulding in 2017. In 2018, their engagement was announced in The Times. They married on 31 August 2019 at York Minster, with the wedding reception held at Castle Howard in North Yorkshire. The ceremony was attended by members of the British royal family, musicians, and other public figures. In February 2021, Goulding announced that she and Jopling were expecting their first child. In February 2024, Goulding and Jopling announced that they had separated, stating that they had "privately separated some time ago" and remained "the closest of friends."

Following their separation, Jopling began a relationship with American actress and filmmaker Olivia Wilde.

== In popular culture ==
In 2018, he guest appeared in Michael McIntyre's Big Show. In 2020, Jopling and Goulding, appeared as guests on an episode of the art podcast Talk Art, hosted by actor Russell Tovey and artist Robert Diament, on the episode "Ellie Goulding and Caspar Jopling (QuarARTine Special Episode)", which was released during the COVID-19 pandemic. Music critics have discussed that some tracks from Goulding's 2026 album I Know Too Much, were inspired by their separation.
