= Destiny (Ellie Goulding song) =

Single by Ellie Goulding
- Released: 12 November 2025
- Recorded: Nashville; Los Angeles
- Genre: Pop; soft rock
- Length: 4:38
- Label: Polydor
- Songwriters: Ellie Goulding; Jack Rochon; Kurtis Wells; Livvi Franc
- Producer: Kurtis Wells

Ellie Goulding singles chronology
"Save My Love" (2025)	"Destiny" (2025)	"Black Prada Dress" (2026)

Music video
- "Destiny" on YouTube

"Destiny" is a song by English singer and songwriter Ellie Goulding. It was released as a single on 12 November 2025 through Polydor Records. An accompanying lyric video dropped the same day, while an official music video premiered two days later. The song was later included on the You Know Too Much digital re-release of Goulding’s sixth studio album, I Know Too Much (2026).

== Background and inspiration ==
"Destiny" was inspired by Goulding's experiences following her divorce. Goulding stated that after separating from her husband, she felt compelled to process the experience through music. The track originated when she encountered a demo by producer Jack Rochon, whose guitar playing she discovered on Instagram and found "immediately fixated" by, prompting her to reach out and begin working together the same day. She later characterised "Destiny" as a turning point and explained that it represented acceptance as well as "surrender of what had happened" rather than escapism.

== Recording and artwork ==
Goulding explained that she returned to guitar-led songwriting, as she wrote songs with Jack Rochon and a small group of collaborators. She stated that she travelled to Nashville for the first time to write material, and later worked in Los Angeles. Although Goulding continued to work across genres such as classical, electronic and dance music, the sessions were marked by a heightened sense of creative freedom and lyrical honesty. Goulding characterised the recording process as "really liberating", and explained that the songs avoid being either overtly mainstream or excessively unconventional, an approach she summarised as "really freeing and different".

Goulding described recording "Destiny" as a cathartic experience that made her feel "so much better". She explained that the track marked her first sense of "straight-up escape", adding that its tone conveys "surrender" and acceptance, which reflects the idea of letting events unfold naturally—an outlook that ultimately informed the song's title. The cover artwork of the song features a side profile of Goulding with her head draped in a veil and the word "Destiny" written in a gothic font.

== Music ==
"Destiny"
A 29-second sample of "Destiny", where the chrous is heard.

"Destiny" is a pop and soft rock song. Co-written by Goulding, Jack Rochon, Livvi Franc and Kurtis Wells with the latter serving as the song's producer, it is built on layered harmonies, a distinctive guitar tone, and clean drum patterns, which incorporates subtle electronic elements while moving away from Goulding's traditionally upbeat pop sound toward a restrained pop rock approach. According to Goulding, "Destiny" reflects an intense but non-romantic chemistry which provids catharsis and personal freedom, and it marks a shift in how she viewed self-love and connection. She added that the song's sound was intended to convey the recklessness and empowerment associated with embracing her sexuality and the chaos in her life.

== Release and promotion ==
In November 2025, Goulding announced her new single "Destiny". It marked her first solo release in two years following a series of collaborations, including "Save My Love" with Marshmello and Avaion earlier that year. Prior to the announcement, Goulding shared a teaser image of herself wearing a dark red leather trench coat and a veil, with her hands raised near her neck.

A portion of the song had previously been featured as the official ending theme for the dark fantasy anime series Clevatess, which premiered on 2 July 2025. An accompanying lyric video was released alongside the song, and the music video was unveiled on 14 November. On 4 December, Goulding uploaded an acoustic live performance of the song to her YouTube. On 10 September 2026, Goulding released an edition of her sixth studio album, I Know Too Much, exclusively on her digitial store titled You Know Too Much, which includes "Destiny".

== Critical reception ==
Jillian Giandurco of Nylon described "Destiny" as a track encompassing "drama, romance, acceptance", praising Goulding's "dreamy, atmospheric approach" amid a pop landscape driven by more abrasive trends. The author characterised the song as a "welcome change of pace" that invites anticipation for her future work.

== Music video ==
A music video, directed by Floria Sigismondi, was released on 14 November 2025, marking Goulding and Sigismondi's second collaboration in over a decade following their work on the music video for Goulding's "Anything Could Happen" (2012). American actor Beau Minniear co-stars as the songstress love interest.

== Personnel ==
Credits were adapted from Apple Music.

=== Performing artists ===
- Ellie Goulding — vocals
- Marsha Morrison — chorus, conductor
- Ulrika Bergelind — chorus
- Alyssa Monet Harrigan — chorus
- Jabez Walsh — chorus
- Jasmine Oakley — chorus
- Jermaine 'JC' Henry — chorus
- Joel Bailey — chorus
- Maleik Loveridge — chorus
- Peace Oluwatobi — chorus
- Serena Prince — chorus
- Tehiillah Ediri — chorus

=== Composition and lyrics ===
- Ellie Goulding — songwriter
- Jack Rochon — songwriter
- Kurtis Wells — songwriter
- Livvi Franc — songwriter

=== Production and engineering ===
- Kurtis Wells — producer
- Jack Rochon — engineer, vocal producer
- Jamie Sprosen — assistant recording engineer
- Joe Brice — assistant recording engineer
- Mollie Crammond — assistant recording engineer
- Calum Landau — engineer, vocal producer
- Harpaal Sanghera — assistant recording engineer
- Jack Emblem — mixing engineer
- Tony Cousins — mastering engineer
- Mike Hillier — immersive mixing engineer

== Charts ==
=== Weekly charts ===
Chart (2025–2026)	Peak position
Costa Rica Anglo Airplay (Monitor Latino)	9
Lithuania Airplay (TopHit)	73

=== Monthly charts ===
Chart (2025)	Peak position
Lithuania Airplay (TopHit)	100

== Release history ==
Region	Date	Format(s)	Label	Ref.
Various	12 November 2025	Digital download; streaming	Polydor	
