= Michael Jopling =

British politician (born 1930)

The Right Honourable The Lord Jopling PC DL

Minister of Agriculture, Fisheries and Food
- In office 11 June 1983 – 13 June 1987
- Prime Minister: Margaret Thatcher
- Preceded by: Peter Walker
- Succeeded by: John MacGregor

Chief Whip of the House of Commons Parliamentary Secretary to the Treasury
- In office 4 May 1979 – 11 June 1983
- Prime Minister: Margaret Thatcher
- Preceded by: Michael Cocks
- Succeeded by: John Wakeham

Lord Commissioner of the Treasury
- In office 30 October 1973 – 4 March 1974
- Prime Minister: Edward Heath
- Preceded by: Oscar Murton
- Succeeded by: Vacant

Assistant Government Whip
- In office 8 November 1971 – 30 October 1973
- Prime Minister: Edward Heath

Member of Parliament for Westmorland and Lonsdale (Westmorland, 1964 – 1983)
- In office 15 October 1964 – 8 April 1997
- Preceded by: William Fletcher-Vane
- Succeeded by: Tim Collins

Member of the House of Lords
- Lord Temporal
- Life peerage 5 June 1997 – 24 July 2026

Personal details
- Born: Thomas Michael Jopling; 10 December 1930 (age 95) Ripon, Yorkshire, England
- Party: Conservative
- Spouse: Hilary Dickinson (m. 1958)
- Children: 2, including Jay
- Education: Durham University; Newcastle University

Thomas Michael Jopling, Baron Jopling (born 10 December 1930) is a British politician who sits in the House of Lords as a member of the Conservative Party.

== Life and career ==
Jopling is the son of Mark Bellerby Jopling (1886–1958), of Masham, North Riding of Yorkshire, a partner in Imeson and Jopling (later Jopling, Cawthorn and Blackburn), surveyors, auctioneers and estate agents. He was educated at Cheltenham College and Durham University. He was a farmer and company director and served on the national council of the National Farmers Union. Jopling was a councillor on Thirsk Rural District Council.

Having previously stood unsuccessfully in Wakefield in 1959, Jopling was elected Conservative MP for Westmorland, now in Cumbria, in 1964 and became Parliamentary Secretary to the Treasury from 1979 to 1983. In 1983, he was elected for Westmorland and Lonsdale after boundary changes, and was appointed Minister of Agriculture, Fisheries and Food from 1983 to 1987.

In his Diaries, the military historian and Tory member of Parliament Alan Clark famously quoted what he claimed was Jopling's "snobby but cutting" dismissal of the ambitious Conservative deputy prime minister Michael Heseltine: "The trouble with Michael is that he had to buy all his furniture".

After over 32 years as a member of the House Commons, Jopling stood down at the 1997 general election and was succeeded by Tim Collins. He was absent during the last few weeks of his Commons career as he was severely injured in a go-karting accident in February 1997. He returned to the House on the last day it sat before it dissolved for the election, and was greeted at Prime Minister's Questions by John Major at his last question session on 20 March.

Jopling was made a life peer as Baron Jopling, of Ainderby Quernhow in the County of North Yorkshire on 5 June 1997. He is a member of the Privy Council and the America All Party Parliamentary Group.

== Personal life ==
Jopling married Hilary Gail Dickinson in 1958; she was appointed an MBE in 2017. The couple had two sons: Nicholas Jopling and art dealer Jay Jopling. Nicholas was active in the Conservative Party, having contested the Sedgefield constituency at the 1992 general election, but losing to the future Labour Party leader and Prime Minister, Tony Blair. Nicholas's son Caspar (Jopling's grandson) was married to singer Ellie Goulding from 2019 to 2024.

Jopling is an Honorary member of the Buck's and Royal Automobile clubs. He lives at Ainderby Hall in Thirsk.

== See also ==
- Politics of the United Kingdom
- Leigh Rayment's Historical List of MPs

Parliament of the United Kingdom
Preceded by William Fletcher-Vane	Member of Parliament for Westmorland; 1964–1983	Constituency abolished
New constituency	Member of Parliament for Westmorland and Lonsdale; 1983–1997	Succeeded by Tim Collins
Political offices
Preceded by Humphrey Atkins	Chief Whip of the Conservative Party; 1979–1983	Succeeded by John Wakeham
Preceded by Michael Cocks	Parliamentary Secretary to the Treasury; 1979–1983	Succeeded by John Wakeham
Preceded by Peter Walker	Minister of Agriculture, Fisheries and Food; 1983–1987	Succeeded by John MacGregor
Orders of precedence in the United Kingdom
Preceded by The Lord Hardie	Gentlemen; Baron Jopling	Followed by The Lord Howell of Guildford
