= For Your Entertainment (Ellie Goulding song) =

Single by Ellie Goulding

from the album I Know Too Much
- Released: 4 September 2026
- Length: 3:53
- Label: Polydor
- Songwriters: Ellie Goulding; Steph Jones; Kiddo A.I.; Connor McDonough; Riley McDonough; Jack Rochon; Jake Torrey
- Producers: Jack Rochon; Connor McDonough; Riley McDonough

Ellie Goulding singles chronology
"Ravers" (2026)	"For Your Entertainment" (2026)

Acoustic Video
- "For Your Entertainment" on YouTube

"For Your Entertainment" is a song by the English singer-songwriter Ellie Goulding. It was released as the fourth single from her sixth studio album, I Know Too Much throughout Polydor Records on 4 September 2026, concurrently with the album.

== Composition ==
According to Aryn Honaker of MXDWN, "For Your Entertainment" describes "a relationship dynamic where someone loves the other so much as to the point of sacrifice, while acknowledging that their willingness to sacrifice for this other person might be detrimental to them." The song was written by Goulding, Jack Rochon, Steph Jones, Connor and Riley McDonough, Jake Torrey, and Kiddo A.I., with Rochon and the McDonough brothers handling its production.

== Promotion and release ==
The song was released on 4 September 2026 alongside the album as its focus track. It appears as the seventh track on I Know Too Much. A lyric video was released the same day. An acoustic version was later released on 11 September and included as a bonus track on the You Know Too Much edition.

== Critical reception ==
Writing for MXDWN, Aryn Honaker described it as a “soft, catchy tune with an impassioned chorus.”Jon Negroni of Slant Magazine dubbed the track the best song on I Know Too Much, praising its intensifying production and Goulding’s performance. Billboard included the song on its list of must-hear new music, with Lyndsey Havens highlighting Goulding’s honest songwriting and comparing it favorably to Taylor Swift’s "Mirrorball." Havens noted that, "while differently sonically, the two songs tread similar lyrical ground, pulling inspiration from the toll of performing."

== Personnel ==
Credits were adapted from Tidal.

- Ellie Goulding — vocalist, composer, lyricist
- Steph Jones — composer, lyricist, vocal producer
- Kiddo A.I. — composer, lyricist
- Connor McDonough — producer, composer, lyricist, vocal producer
- Riley McDonough — producer, composer, lyricist
- Jack Rochon — producer, composer, lyricist, bass, guitar, organ
- Jake Torrey — composer, lyricist
- Randy Merrill — mastering engineer
- Spike Stent — mixing engineer
- Antonio Tucci Jr. — recording engineer
- Calum Landau — recording engineer

== Charts ==
Chart performance
Chart (2026)	Peak position
Guatemala Anglo Airplay (Monitor Latino)	12
Japan Hot Overseas (Billboard Japan)	12
New Zealand Hot Singles (RMNZ)	23
Romania Airplay (TopHit)	271

== Release history ==
Release dates and formats
Region	Date	Format(s)	Label	Ref.
Various	4 September 2026	Digital download; streaming	Polydor	
Italy	16 October 2026	Radio airplay	EMI	
