= Clevatess =

Japanese manga series by Yūji Iwahara

- Clevatess: The King of Dark Beasts, the Baby, and the Undead Hero
- First tankōbon volume cover, featuring (from left to right) Clevatess as Klen, Luna, and Alicia Glenfall

クレバテス−魔獣の王と赤子と屍の勇者− (Kurebatesu: Majū no Ō to Akago to Shikabane no Yūsha)
- Genre: Dark fantasy
- Manga
- Written by: Yūji Iwahara
- Published by: Line Digital Frontier; Media Factory
- English publisher: NA: Yen Press
- Magazine: Line Manga; Comic Alive+; (April 24, 2024 – present)
- Original run: August 12, 2020 – present
- Volumes: 14
- Anime television series
- Directed by: Kiyotaka Taguchi
- Written by: Keigo Koyanagi
- Music by: Nobuaki Nobusawa
- Studio: Lay-duce
- Licensed by: Crunchyroll; SEA: Medialink
- Original network: AT-X, Tokyo MX, SUN, KBS Kyoto, BS NTV, TUF, NBS, UTY, itv, IBC, Miyatere, MRO, TV Shizuoka, TSS, AAB, HTB, NKT, NIB, Mētele, BSN, RBC, RAB, Tulip TV, Fukui TV, TUY, KKB
- Original run: July 2, 2025 – September 30, 2026
- Episodes: 25
- icon

Clevatess, fully name as Clevatess: The King of Dark Beasts, the Baby, and the Undead Hero, (Note: クレバテス−魔獣の王と赤子と屍の勇者−, Kurebatesu: Majū no Ō to Akago to Shikabane no Yūsha) is a Japanese manga series written and illustrated by Yūji Iwahara. It began serialization on Line Digital Frontier's Line Manga service in August 2020 and is also serialized on Media Factory's Comic Alive+ website since April 2024.

An anime television series adaptation produced by Lay-duce aired from July to September 2025. A second season aired from July to September 2026.

== Premise ==
After defeating a group of heroes and destroying an entire kingdom as revenge for attacking his lands, one of the Four Beast Kings, Clevatess, takes in a baby belonging to the kingdom's royal family. He resurrects and enslaves a hero, Alicia Glenfall, so she can help him take care of the baby while hoping to examine humanity more closely. Before long, they find themselves at war against Vorden, another one of the Four Beast Kings.

== Characters ==
=== Main Characters ===
Alicia Glenfall (アリシア・グレンフォール, Arishia Gurenfōru)
Voiced by: Haruka Shiraishi (Japanese); Katie Wetch, Nia Celeste (young) (English)
One of the thirteen heroes who is killed by Clevatess, but later revived to accompany him on a journey with Luna. She is technically an animated corpse who is bound to Clevatess by his dark magic, preventing her from disobeying him or being killed. She is later given the younger appearance of a Hidenian and uses the alias Alyssa Sleihunt during her time at Solsein. She is eventually turned into a mouse-like monster by Dean, but upon entering Vorden's domain, she returns to normal and reverts into an adult and a human. However, after Klen is killed by Jazhak, she dies along with him.
Clevatess (クレバテス, Kurebatesu) / Klen (クレン, Kuren)
Voiced by: Yuichi Nakamura, Mutsumi Tamura (Klen) (Japanese); Sean Letourneau, Morgan Berry (Klen) (English)
One of the Four Beast Kings who rules the dark lands. He has grown interested in humanity after the heroes' failed attack. When adventuring, he disguises himself as "Klen", taking the appearance of a young boy (whose name is later revealed to be Shiro) who died while protecting Luna, though he is weaker in this form. His true form is a giant dark wolf with many tails. He is not all that ruthless as he has no interest in conquest, but will attack anyone who threatens him and his lands. He is currently the caretaker of Luna and master of Alicia and Nelluru, as well as Luna's magic instructor following Dorel's defeat. During his time at Solsein, he uses the alias Klen Vatiss. He is eventually killed by Jazhak, who takes his heart.
Luna (ルナ, Runa)
Voiced by: Saya Aizawa (Japanese); Lara Woodhull (English)
A baby who is the prince of the Haiden family, whom Clevatess, Alicia, and Nelluru take care of. Luna has a good influence on Klen as the baby's presence is what keeps him from threatening humanity. It is later revealed that he is Toara's son and his real name is Toth. He is soon reunited with his mother. He soon develops the ability to speak and can use magical powers. In the future, sometime after Klen was murdered by Jazhak, he watches over the Dark Beasts in Klen's tower until Klen revives.
Nell (ネル, Neru) / Nelluru (ネルル, Neruru)
Voiced by: Aoi Yūki (Japanese); Celeste Perez (English)
A slave of the Crows. Born in a shaft as a slave child, she was protected by her mother until the latter disappeared when the former was 12. Since then, the bandits have been treating her cruelly as a way to relieve stress, and she has been beaten so much that she can only hear on one side, and her face and teeth are ruined, making it difficult to speak. While she was pregnant three times, all of them were stillborn. Because she produces breast milk, she cares for the babies that have been kidnapped. She later joins Klen after he resurrected her using the corpse of Broco's pet troll Betty, who devoured Nell under Broco's orders, giving her super strength. She now takes care of Luna.

=== Hiden ===
The King of Hiden (ハイデン王, Haiden Ō)
Voiced by: Jun Hashizume (Japanese); Garrett Schenck (English)
The unnamed ruler of Hiden, who is killed by Clevatess for launching an attack on his lands. He is later revived by Hiden's forge. After failing to convert Luna into the next heir using the forge, he drops himself into the forge as a final attempt to destroy Klen, which ends in failure. It is later revealed that Vorden was manipulating him.
Toara Mort Anzetta (トアラ・モールト・アンゼッタ, Toara Mōto Anzetta)
Voiced by: Aki Toyosaki (Japanese); Molly Zhang (English)
Luna's birth mother and the princess of Hiden. She becomes Hiden's new regent after Dorel is killed and upon reuniting with her son.
Favio Fleep (ファヴィオ・フライイープ, Favio Furīpu)
Voiced by: Tasuku Hatanaka (Japanese); Mauricio Ortiz-Segura (English)
A loyal Hidenian servant who works for Toara.
Stefan (ステファン, Sutefan)
Voiced by: Mamoru Miyano (Japanese); Drew Breedlove (English)
One of the thirteen heroes who is murdered by Clevatess. He was considered to be the strongest and the leader of the group.
Mirlo (ミルロ, Miruro)
Voiced by: Yūki Ono (Japanese); Eric Wheeldon (English)
One of the thirteen heroes who is murdered by Clevatess.
Holgas (ホルガス, Horugasu)
Voiced by: Kenta Miyake (Japanese); Jim Foronda (English)
One of the thirteen heroes who is murdered by Clevatess.
Katz (カッツ, Kattsu)
Voiced by: Yuma Uchida (Japanese); Chase Kloza (English)
One of the thirteen heroes who is murdered by Clevatess.
Mudo (ムド)
Voiced by: Yōhei Azakami (Japanese); Kyle Phillips (English)
One of the thirteen heroes who is murdered by Clevatess.
Minark (ミナーク, Mināku)
Voiced by: Shimba Tsuchiya (Japanese); Kevin D. Thelwell (English)
One of the thirteen heroes who is murdered by Clevatess.
Margo Glenfall (マルゴ・グレンフォール, Marugo Gurenfōru)
Voiced by: Miou Tanaka (Japanese); Cris George (English)
Alicia's father who was killed by Dorel when his daughter grew up. He and Dorel used to be partners. Alicia later avenges him.
Karl (カルル, Karuru)
Voiced by: Mayumi Shintani
The owner of an inn. She is Pito and Phil's mother, and Mark's wife.
Mark (マーク, Māku)
Voiced by: Mitsuaki Kanuka (Japanese); Jeremy Inman (English)
Karl's husband, and Pito and Phil's father.
Pito and Phil
Karl and Mark's sons, who are distrustful of outsiders, but soon grow to respect Alicia.

=== Dark Beasts ===
Vorden (フォルデイン, Borudein)
Voiced by: Takaya Kuroda (Japanese); William Ofoegbu (English)
The oldest and strongest of the Four Dark Beast Kings, who has ulterior motives and an obsession for the Hero Legend, which he seeks to recreate so he can destroy Toah. He is hunting for the Books of Toah and manipulates the King of Hiden, Dorel, Mirea's alternate persona, and several students from Solsein to do his dirty work. The other three Beast Kings are at war against him. Like Klen, he can take on a human form that came from the corpse of a hero that he defeated in the past, though otherwise, he has the appearance of a giant red dragon with six eyes. When disguised as a human, he uses the name "Vod". It is later revealed that his true goal is to revive his friend Write and finish his story, but was not aware that he was being manipulated. He is killed by a possessed Write.
Zavthier (ザフティエ, Zafutie)
Voiced by: Megumi Han
Zavthier of Ghosts, or Zavthier of Mist is one of the Four Beast Kings, who opposes Vorden's plans and works with Klen and Rathwell to stop him. She is an angel-like being with long blue-green hair, and uses Sarasa to communicate with others outside of her realm. She is the only Beast King that is female.
Rathwell (ラスウェル, Rasuweru)
Voiced by: Tomokazu Sugita^{Ep. 21 credits}
One of the Four Beast Kings, who uses Edison's body as a vessel. He is a tiny, blue, insect-like parasite, who always controls bodies as vessels. He too opposes Vorden's plans and works with Klen and Zavthier to stop him. He helped Edison improve his ability to manipulate coal. One of his parasitic avatars is killed by a possessed Write.
Gart (ガルト, Garuto)
Voiced by: Takaya Aoyagi (Japanese); Dio Garner (English)
A shapeshifting dark beast who serves Zavthier as a scout and spy.

=== Boelate ===
Dorel (ドレル, Doreru)
Voiced by: Hiroki Yasumoto (Japanese); Mike Smith (English)
An antagonistic general who seeks to obtain arcanacites from the remains of Haiden for his kingdom Boelate. He is responsible for killing Alicia's father, whom he used to be partners with. He also possesses powerful magic and wields a Regalia sword. It is revealed that he is working for Vorden. He is soon killed by Alicia after she destroys his sword.
Maynard Swamm (メイナード, Meinādo)
Voiced by: Chiharu Shigematsu (Japanese); Kiba Walker (English)
Drel's second-in-command. He can control an army of giant insects. He is eventually defeated by Alicia and was imprisoned for his crimes.
Naie Chiffonlits (ナイエ・ヒッフォンィツ, Naie Chifonrīsu)
Voiced by: Tomoyo Kurosawa (Japanese); Mallorie Rodak (English)
A wizard who serves Boelate. She can control magnetism and fly. She is later sent undercover as a teacher in Solsein. By this time, she is now terrified of Klen and Alicia. After her time in Solsein is over, she returned to Boelate to inform Beis of Toah.
Mirea Renault Allozar Wers (ミレア)
Voiced by: Akira Sekine (Japanese); Jill Harris (English)
The princess of Boelate. She is Beis's daughter. Dean, later revealed to be possessed by her alternate persona, swapped bodies with her and imprisoned her in the Mirror Labyrinth, though her original appearance remains the same while in the labyrinth. She and her alternate persona eventually became one after Alicia rescued her.
Beis Werz (ベイス・ワアーズ, Beisu Wāzu)
Voiced by: Hōchū Ōtsuka^{Ep. 13 credits}
The emperor of Boelate. He is Mirea's father, but does not know of his daughter is really imprisoned and impersonated by Dean, later revealed to have been used as a vessel by Mirea's alternate persona.
Jazhak (ジャズハク, Jazuhaku)
Voiced by: Akio Otsuka^{Ep. 13 credits}
A hulking warrior and "hero slayer" who was the original leader of the Crows, and is now a prisoner who works for Beis. He is later sent to infiltrate Solsein; he does not disguise himself as a teacher or student and instead keeps his distance until the right time. He eventually escapes and murders Klen, taking his heart with him.

=== Eslinn ===
Rod Royes (ロッド・ロイェス, Roddo Royesu)
Voiced by: Tomokazu Seki (Japanese); Aaron Roberts (English)
A general who is at war against Boelate. He can wield magic as well as fight. He is later sent undercover as a teacher in Solsein using the alias Matthew Barnes.
Miquel Mendes (ミケル・メンデス, Mikeru Mendesu)
Voiced by: Yūto Uemura (Japanese); Derick Snow (English)
Rod's second-in-command. He also works undercover as a teacher at Solsein alongside Rod using the alias Teddy Swann.
Uriel Esliel (ユリエル・エスリエル, Yurieru Esurieru)
Voiced by: Reiji Kawashima^{Ep. 13 credits}
The young king of Eslinn.
Owen Koath (オーウェン・コウース, Ōuen Kōsu)
Voiced by: Tomoya Warabino^{Ep. 13 credits}
A sword saint who works for Uriel.

=== Solsein ===
Ray Rukereft (レイ・ルカアーエフト, Rei Rukerefuto)
Voiced by: Shūichirō Umeda (Japanese); Justin Briner (English)
A student who attends Solsein. He is calm in most situations and can use powerful magic. In the past, he became friends with Shiro. Once Ray learned of Shiro's death, he vowed to avenge him and kill Klen. However, following Vorden's defeat, he appeared to have given up revenge.
Mary Maryweather/Mary Mary (メリーメリー, Merīmerī)
Voiced by: Yurina Kikuchi (Japanese); Marisa Duran (English)
A student who attends Solsein. She can use magic and combat skills. Like Ray, she is calm in most situations.
Andrew Hwyp (アンドリュー・フウィプ, Andoryū Huwipu)
Voiced by: Tatsumaru Tachibana (Japanese); Ciarán Strange (English)
A student who attends Solsein. He is also capable of using magic, but is also addicted to Vorden's power.
Tigel Blouyer (ティゲル・ブォウヤアー, Tigeru Buroeru)
Voiced by: Ryōta Suzuki (Japanese); Alejandro Saab (English)
A student who attends Solsein. He is Leon's brother and they both specialize in magic. He and Leon are also very arrogant and hot-tempered.
Leon Blouyer (リオン・ブォウヤアー, Rion Buroeru)
Voiced by: Hiromu Mineta (Japanese); Ricco Fajardo (English)
A student who attends Solsein. He is Tigel's brother and they both specialize in magic. He and Tigel are also very arrogant and hot-tempered.
Sarasa Lew Eila Lafolka (サラサ・ェウ・エイァ・ァフォゥカ, Sarasa Reu Eira Raforuka)
Voiced by: Misaki Kuno (Japanese); Monica Flatley (English)
A student who attends Solsein. She resembles a little girl. She is revealed to be Orggite Shamaness Godspeaker, the next heir of the Orggites and is both a follower and vessel of Zavtheir. She visits an older Luna in the future.
Edison Rukereft (エディソン・ルカアーエフト, Edison Rukerefuto)
Voiced by: Koutaro Nishiyama (Japanese); Kevin D. Thelwell (English)
A student who attends Solsein. He is actually a human vessel for the Demon Lord Rathwell. He can manipulate coal, which is amplified by Rathwell's powers. Rathwell eventually leaves him.
Dean Cardinal Elro Romain (ディーン・カールダナル・エゥロ・ローメイン, Dīn Karudinaru Eruro Romein)
Voiced by: Shirō Sano (Japanese); Brian Mathis (English)
The chairman of Solsein, who is also the leader of a cult that serves Vorden. He swapped bodies with Mirea before trapping her in the Mirror Labyrinth. However, it is discovered that he has become a vessel to Mirea's alternate persona, who originated from the Mirror Labyrinth. He is eventually freed in the end.
Lang Feiss (ラーング・フェイッス, Rāngu Faisu)
Voiced by: Akira Ishida^{Ep. 14 credits}
A magic instructor from Solsein.
Nathan Franc (ネイサン・フラーングク, Nasan Furānku)
Voiced by: Risae Matsuda^{Ep. 14 credits}
A student who attends Solsein. After being transformed into a dark beast and returned to normal by Mary Mary, he leaves the school.
Meg (メグ, Megu)
Voiced by: Arisa Seito^{Ep. 15 credits}
A student who attends Solsein. She can use fire magic.
Shiro (シロ)
The boy who saved Luna and entrusted him to Klen before his death. Klen's human form resembles him. He and Ray knew each other in the past and became friends.

=== Other characters ===
Write (ライト, Raito)
Voiced by: Tatsuomi Hamada^{Ep. 24 credits}
The original Hero of Toah millennia ago, who caused the downfall of the Toah civilization as retribution for all the heroes they summoned from other worlds to slay Dark Beasts and enslave people, and Vorden's friend. He also killed himself after that and his body is kept in a shrine in the ruins of Toah. It was he who wrote the Books of Toah. Vorden now seeks to revive him and finish what he started. However, he is revived and possessed by the spirit of Toah, but is soon killed by Klen.
Broco (ブロコ, Buroko)
Voiced by: Shigeru Chiba
The ruthless leader of the Crows. He is killed by Alicia.
Carme (カルメ, Karume)
Voiced by: Fairouz Ai (Japanese); Kelsey Cruz (English)
A woman who works at the Crows' headquarters.
Betty (ベティ, Beti)
Voiced by: Haruna Himeno
Broco's pet troll. She is killed by Klen, who uses her corpse to revive Nelluru.
Dagan (デイガン)
Voiced by: Taiten Kusunoki
Dagan is a large and brutish member of the Crows.
Fleeto
A member of the Crows. He is blind, but has excellent hearing, touching, and smelling. He is killed by Alicia.

== Media ==
=== Manga ===
Written and illustrated by Yūji Iwahara, Clevatess started on the Line Manga digital platform on August 12, 2020, with the first collected tankōbon volume published on the same day; the fourteenth and latest volume was released digitally on September 8, 2026. The manga has also been published on Media Factory's Comic Alive+ website since April 24, 2024, as well as Webtoon since March 23, 2025. A new edition of compiled volumes started with the first and second volumes on July 5, 2024, followed by the third volume on August 28, then the fourth volume on September 28.

In February 2026, Yen Press announced that they had licensed the series for English publication, with the first volume set to release in August later in the year.

No.	Original release date	Original ISBN	English release date	English ISBN
1	August 12, 2020 (LDF); July 5, 2024 (MF)	978-4-86697-080-6; 978-4-04-811299-4 (NE)	August 25, 2026	979-8-8554-4284-7
2	February 15, 2021 (LDF); July 5, 2024 (MF)	978-4-86697-146-9; 978-4-04-811300-7 (NE)	November 24, 2026	979-8-8554-4286-1
3	September 15, 2021 (LDF); August 28, 2024 (MF)	978-4-86697-208-4; 978-4-04-811347-2 (NE)	March 23, 2027	979-8-8554-4315-8
4	March 15, 2022 (LDF); September 28, 2024 (MF)	978-4-86697-249-7; 978-4-04-811348-9 (NE)	—	—
5	October 14, 2022 (LDF); November 28, 2024 (MF)	978-4-86697-279-4; 978-4-04-811349-6 (NE)	—	—
6	April 14, 2023 (LDF); January 28, 2025 (MF)	978-4-86697-291-6; 978-4-04-811350-2 (NE)	—	—
7	April 15, 2024 (LDF); March 28, 2025 (MF)	978-4-04-811351-9 (NE)	—	—
8	October 15, 2024 (LDF); May 28, 2025 (MF)	978-4-04-811506-3 (NE)	—	—
9	April 15, 2025 (LDF); July 28, 2025 (MF)	978-4-04-811569-8 (NE)	—	—
10	July 2, 2025 (LDF); September 26, 2025 (MF)	978-4-04-811626-8 (NE)	—	—
11	October 15, 2025 (LDF); January 28, 2026 (MF)	978-4-04-811753-1 (NE)	—	—
12	March 16, 2026 (LDF); April 28, 2026 (MF)	978-4-04-811890-3 (NE)	—	—
13	July 8, 2026 (LDF); July 28, 2026 (MF)	978-4-04-811995-5 (NE)	—	—
14	September 15, 2026 (LDF); October 28, 2026 (MF)	978-4-04-972227-7 (NE)	—	—

=== Anime ===
An anime television series adaptation was announced on July 2, 2024. It is produced by Lay-duce and directed by Kiyotaka Taguchi, with Keigo Koyanagi writing series scripts, Souichirou Sako designing the characters, and Nobuaki Nobusawa composing the music. The series aired from July 2 to September 17, 2025, on AT-X and other networks. The opening theme song is "Ruler", performed by Mayu Maeshima, while the ending theme song is "Destiny", performed by Ellie Goulding. Crunchyroll is streaming the series. Medialink licensed the series in Southeast Asia and Oceania for streaming on Ani-One Asia's YouTube channel.

After the airing of the final episode, a second season was announced, with the cast and staff reprising their roles. The season premiered from July 8 to September 30, 2026. The opening theme song is "Foreshadow", performed by Maeshima, while the ending theme song is "Awake Anew", performed by Myth & Roid.

==== Season 1 (2025) ====
No. overall	No. in season	Title	Directed by	Storyboarded by	Original release date
1	1	"The Lord of Dark Beasts"; Transliteration: "Majū no Ō" (Japanese: 魔獣の王)	Takurō Tsukada & Makoto Sokuza	Takurō Tsukada & Makoto Sokuza	July 2, 2025
A young Alicia learned of the history of the dark lands ruled by the Four Beast Kings from her father Margo and inspired to be an adventurer. When Alicia grew into a young adult, Margo was killed in an attack. In the present, Alicia is now a member of a group of thirteen heroes sent by the kingdom's royal family of Hiden to slay the demon king Clevatess, which is unsuccessful as Clevatess is too powerful. As a result, all the heroes are killed. In retaliation, Clevatess invades and destroys Hiden, killing its king. Before leaving the palace, he reluctantly accepts a dying boy's final request to take care of a baby. He soon revives Alicia with an immortality curse that forces her to serve him (as the curse renders her unable to disobey him) and requests that she breastfeeds the baby, which she is unable to do since she is a virgin. They ultimately decide to hire a wet nurse and take some arcanacites as payment. Clevatess soon takes a human form under the alias Klen and names the baby Luna. While taking care of Luna, Alicia discovers that Luna is of royal blood. They are then captured by bandits. Meanwhile, a man named Favio discovers that the king of Hiden foolishly attacked the dark lands while another kingdom attempts to get its hands on the arcanacites in Haiden.
2	2	"The Beast Lord in Captivity"; Transliteration: "Torawareta Majū Ō" (Japanese: 囚われた魔獣王)	Hitomi Ezoe	Charlie Shinohara	July 9, 2025
Klen reveals that he is weaker in human form and intends to stay this way until Luna becomes king. In turn, Alicia reveals that they are captured by a group of slave traders called the Crows. Arriving at their hideout, Alicia is brought to see the boss while Klen is made to work in the kitchen where he meets Nell, a slave girl, and the kitchen's owner, Carme. Upon meeting Broco, the leader, and his pet troll Betty, he demands that Alicia takes them to where her allies' weapons are, but she refuses. Meanwhile, Nell breastfeeds Luna before she is punished by a couple of the members of the Crows. Once Klen kills them, he requests her background. After she explains it, Klen attempts to hire her as Luna's wet nurse, but she declines. Elsewhere, Alicia is brought to a flooded mine swarming with Arvensis where she learns the Crows are after a sword belonging to the hero Khord called the Regalia, which is located at the bottom. When a blind bandit named Fleeto threatens to rape Alicia, she causes them to fall from a great height in hopes that Klen's curse will ensure that she survives.
3	3	"Hero's Duty"; Transliteration: "Yūsha no Shigoto" (Japanese: 勇者の仕事)	Shinsuke Terasawa	Shinsuke Terasawa	July 16, 2025
Believing Alicia to be dead, the other bandits decide to go down to investigate. Alicia's theory is right as she has indeed survived and Klen contacts her, who tells her about Nell. Alicia suggests killing all the bandits, but Klen explains that she has to be the one to kill them before healing her. The bandits are shocked to see that she survived and prepare to attack her, but she manages to hold her own against them while recalling her father's training. She then lures out the Arvensis by knocking some of the bandits into the mine before diving into it to get the Regalia. Elsewhere, Nell returns to work in the kitchen and questions Carme about her origins, but she refuses to say. Broco, having been overhearing their conversation, learns of Luna's presence and takes Nell away. Inside a dark tunnel, he feeds her to Betty in retaliation for her betrayal. Klen then shows up and when Broco orders Betty to attack, she instead reacts in fear and barfs Nell out as Klen moves her and Luna away. Broco uses mind-controlling magic to make Betty attack Klen.
4	4	"Magical Talent"; Transliteration: "Majutsu no Tekisei" (Japanese: 魔術の適性)	Ryōta Ono	Noriaki Saitō	July 23, 2025
Despite her immortality, Alicia suffocates as she reaches the bottom. While she finds the Regalia, she is attacked by another monster called the Ancient One. When Alicia returns to the surface, she refuses to help the bandits and leaves them to be killed. Meanwhile, Klen manages to defeat Betty, but is unhappy that Alicia did not tell him about the mind-controlling magic. When Broco attempts to flee with Luna, a still alive Nell grabs him. Alicia cannot clear away the magic smoke as she has no magical abilities. Seeing that Luna is what is pacifying Klen, Alicia decides to help find Luna. When she does, Broco threatens to injure Luna. Alicia throws the Regalia into a wall as a way to get Broco to relinquish Luna, but he is unswayed as he still desires the weapons that the thirteen heroes used and considers Luna more valuable. Broco tries to escape using invisibility magic, but fails and is killed by Alicia as she can still hear him and Luna. Klen is unable to heal Nell as his magic can only ensure the survival of one person, so Alicia willingly sacrifices herself. As a result, both Alicia and Nell, now referred to as Nelluru, are miraculously revived, with Nelluru now fully healed.
5	5	"Boelate's March"; Transliteration: "Bōrēto no Shingun" (Japanese: ボーレートの進軍)	Makoto Sokuza	Makoto Sokuza	July 30, 2025
Klen stores away the Regalia to avoid attracting unwanted attention, but promises to give it back if Alicia needs it. Nelluru is shown to be quite strong as she can carry heavy loads and Luna. Alicia is allowed to obtain the weapons and armor that she needs. A man named Gart ambushes them. Klen stops the fight and learns that Gart is after Broco, believing that Klen is his target. Once Klen clears up the misunderstanding and that Broco is already dead, he reveals that Gart is a dark beast in human form and works for another demon lord named Zavthier, while introducing himself as a servant of Clevatess. Alicia is shocked to learn that there's more than one dark beast, but Klen explains that not all dark beasts can speak and take human forms. Grat reveals that Zavthier considers killing humans due to the Crows stealing young beasts from the dark lands and selling them to a group of mercenaries led by Vroko; Klen has been told of this by Carme. Alicia tells them about wizards and Dorel, who was responsible for killing her father. Meanwhile, a general named Rod learns from his second-in-command Miquel about their progress in their battle against Dorel's army. Dorel learns of Luna's existence and sends Maynard to retrieve him.
6	6	"Insect Controlling Wizard"; Transliteration: "Mushi o Ayatsuru Wizādo" (Japanese: 虫を操る魔導士(ウィザード))	Hitomi Ezoe	Yasuhiro Irie	August 6, 2025
Shortly after Gart leaves, the group settle down for a break. Alicia informs Klen of Dorel's attempt to conquer Haiden and that he must be stopped. Klen takes his true form and leaves to handle the situation. Meanwhile, Rod continues to lead his forces against Dorel, with Favio watching them. Alicia, Luna, and Nelluru arrive in a town where they see former members of the Crows being tortured and hanged, but they ignore the situation. They stay at an inn run by Karl and her sons Pito and Phil, who are distrustful of outsiders. Maynard discovers their location and sends giant insects to surround the town. He attacks the inn, demanding that Luna be handed to him. Meanwhile, Nelluru is attacked by a wizard named Naie, who works for Boelate.
7	7	"Secrets of Magic"; Transliteration: "Majutsu Ōgi" (Japanese: 魔術奥義)	Makoto Sokuza	Noriaki Saitō	August 13, 2025
As Klen continues his journey, Naie attempts to examine Luna's skills using a magical candy while Maynard attempts to stop Alicia from interfering. Nelluru saves Luna using her strength while Alicia overcomes Maynard's giant bugs. The three escape, with Naie unable to stop them due to Maynard's bugs blocking her. Maynard recognizes Alicia, having known of her father's death. He and Naie gather all the townsfolks in the center of the town square and manipulate them into helping them hunt down Alicia's group. Meanwhile, Dorel and Rod, the latter having intercepted the former, fight until Dorel overpowers Rod, though chooses to spare him. Klen then arrives on the battlefield to question Dorel about the kidnappings of human and monster infants. Although Klen pierces him, Dorel unleashes a spell to trap him in a prison while transferring his own soul into his sword. As Dorel leads his forces onward, Alicia, Nelluru, and Luna find themselves hunted by the townsfolks and Maynard's forces.
8	8	"Current of Insects"; Transliteration: "Mushi no Ryūdō" (Japanese: 蟲の流動)	Saori Yamamoto	Yō Nakano	August 20, 2025
Alicia's group is cornered in a watermill. Phil and Pito's parents stop their sons from burning down the mill before Mark, their father, gets Alicia to come out. Upon learning that she fought Clevatess, Mark forewarns her of the dangers that would happen in the dark lands. Convincing the villagers to stand down after seeing that Alicia is no threat, Mark allows her group to leave, but he is wounded by Maynard. The villagers take shelter inside the mill while Alicia fights off Maynard's insects before being infected by their venom. Maynard expresses his hatred of heroes as Klen contacts her. The villagers fend off bugs entering the mill. Maynard then summons a giant scorpion and knocks Alicia into the river. Giant larvae begin devouring the area around them before transforming into moths. After reemerging, Alicia is outmatched by the venomous bugs, but Klen summons the Regalia, allowing her to slay all the bugs and overpower Maynard; when he refuses to surrender, Alicia decapacitates him. This leaves Naie stunned. Klen returns, having seemly escaped Dorel's prison. He reveals that another Demon King is helping Dorel.
9	9	"War Zone Hiderat"; Transliteration: "Senjō no Haidorāto" (Japanese: 戦場のハイドラート)	Shinsuke Terasawa	Shinsuke Terasawa	August 27, 2025
In the ruins of Haiden, Princess T'ala helps survivors get to safety while searching for her missing son. Favio arrives and informs her of Dorel's approach and Clevatess's apparent imprisonment. T'ala becomes determined to stop him and prepares for battle as Dorel breaches Hiden. Meanwhile, Naie is captured by Phil and Pito, and Alicia and Klen force her to tell them about Dorel's motives. Klen reveals that Dorel actually imprisoned a decoy of him. After revealing that Dorel needs Luna to obtain the forge in Haiden, Naie escapes and attempts to abduct Luna and Nelluru, but Klen and Alicia, who arranged for this escape, easily catch up and take her hostage again, forcing her to levitate their wagon and serve as their means of transportation. They bid farewell to the villagers as they head for Haiden. Reaching the kingdom, they encounter an ongoing battle. Spotting Dorel, they head towards him as he fights T'ala and her forces. He easily overpowers them before Alicia arrives. As Alicia fights Dorel, Klen goes with Luna and Nelluru to find the forge. Klen pulls Favio and his men, who were guarding the forge, into the shadows as they reach the forge's entrance and attempts to use Luna to open it.
10	10	"Margo and Drel"; Transliteration: "Marugo to Doerut" (Japanese: マルゴとドエル)	Takurō Tsukada	Kotomi Deai	September 3, 2025
Gart finds Clevatess's prison, but cannot free him, though he isn't aware that what is inside isn't the real Clevatess. He is confronted by Rod, who wants him to help after informing him of Dorel's plot. Gart agrees, but warns him that he will be killed if he doesn't agree with his conditions. Klen cannot open the forge's entrance even with Luna's help, so he enters through the chimney. Soon after, Nelluru is subdued by the still-alive Hiden king, who takes Luna and reveals himself to Klen. Meanwhile, the fight between Dorel and Alicia continues, with Alicia's immortality keeping her alive. Dorel reveals that 25 years ago, he and Margo used to be partners. Margo defeated him in a contest and is awarded with a Regalia sword by the Haiden king, but explains that it captures the soul of whatever it is slayed with first. When attempting to defeat a dragon from the Dark Lands, all of their party members were slain and Margo is badly injured, so he passes his Regalia to Dorel, who uses it to defeat the dragon. However, the sword's power absorbs the dragon's soul, which summoned a Demon King that corrupts him. He and Margo returned safely to the kingdom. After the flashback ends, T'ala and Alicia are horrified by this revelation as Dorel summons an undead dragon that knocks Alicia over the edge before he heads off to the forge. Having once again survived, Alicia attempts to warn Klen, but he is too preoccupied with another situation as the king attempts to throw Luna into the forge.
11	11	"Fake Hero"; Transliteration: "Nisemono no Yūsha" (Japanese: 偽物の勇者)	Hiroki Tanaka	Hiroki Tanaka	September 10, 2025
Alicia is approached by T'ala, and she explains to the princess that her fellow heroes are all dead, making Alicia the only survivor, and that her son, revealed to be Luna, is alive. As they proceed to the forge, T'ala explains the history of the heroes to Alicia and does not wish for her son to be king under the forge's power. The Hiden King uses Luna to open the forge, but Klen stops him and questions his motives. The King explains that those who become king are thrown into the forge and are revived as the new king who cannot disobey the forge (which explains how the king was revived), also revealing that Luna's true name is Toth before dropping him in. Klen reveals that he has the real Luna and whom the king dropped into forge was a shadowy decoy. The king decides to drop himself into the forge to make it destroy Klen and Luna, triggering an explosion. Meanwhile, Dorel also heads to the forge, but is ambushed by Rod and Gart, though he survives. Alicia joins the fight, but Dorel still manages to overpower her and Rod. The two eventually manage to outsmart and kill him, but he revives in a much stronger form. After revealing his desire to eliminate all traces of heroes, he unleashes a deadly attack on them. Having survived, Klen finds the Book of Toah, a magical tome that appeared when the forge was destroyed, which is the cause of the forge's existence, Hiden's motives, and the heroes' attempt to kill him. Showing little interest, he decides to leave Luna and return home.
12	12	"Return of the King"; Transliteration: "Ō no Gaisen" (Japanese: 王の凱旋)	Ryōta Ono	Takayuki Sano	September 17, 2025
Alicia reprimands Klen for choosing to leave and tells him to look at Luna's eyes as the baby makes his way to Klen, to which he sees a light-purple aura inside his eyes, making him reconsider. Nelluru saves Alicia with her strength, but Alicia fails to defeat Dorel. However, she manages to break his sword. With the sword destroyed, Dorel is quickly killed in a gruesome way. Alicia fears that Vorden, the Demon Lord helping Dorel, may appear, but Klen appears with Luna and assures her that he won't. T'ala sees Luna and recognizes him as her son, but Klen lets Luna decide whom to go to and lets him walk to his mother. Luna and T'ala are reunited. Rod goes to inform the others of Dorel's defeat, and Klen reveals that he kept the Book of Toah. A salamander who works for Vorden warns him of his master's response to the situation, but Klen rebuffs this. With Dorel dead, the enemy soldiers and Naie either surrender or retreat. As Alicia recovers from her fight, Klen tells her about the history he learned from the Book and suspects that there are more of them. Favio comes and brings Klen's group to see T'ala and Luna in the throne room, where the former thanks them for their help in saving the kingdom. Despite Nelluru's fears, T'ala is grateful for her help keeping Luna alive. Klen then asks to become Luna's magic instructor as a reward, though Alicia is embarrassed with having to help him with the appearance of a young Hidenian.

==== Season 2 (2026) ====
No. overall	No. in season	Title	Directed by	Storyboarded by	Original release date
13	1	"Solsein the Divine Academy"; Transliteration: "Shin-gakkō Sorusein" (Japanese: 神学校ソルセイン)	Takuro Tsukada	Noriaki Saitō	July 8, 2026
Alicia comes under attack by giant spiders as a strange dark force emerges from a pond with others noticing, forming a dark tower. Klen is on top of the tower holding the Book of Toah. The episode then flashes back to where Klen became Luna's magic instructor. T'ala and Alicia go to attend a conference with Yuriel Esliel, the ruler of Eslinn, and Beis Werz, the ruler of Boelate. Beis sends his warrior Jazhak, the original leader of the Crows, to combat sword saint Owen Koath. Jazhak takes an interest in Alicia and her sword. During the meeting, the nobles talk about Dorel's actions, revealing that he was experimenting on infants, which horrifies T'ala and Alicia, who wonders what Vorden is after. During the meeting, they learn that Dorel's secret lies in an academy called Solsein. Klen goes undercover as a student in the school, but Alicia feels embarrassed that Klen modified her body to make her look younger and gave her the appearance of a Hidenian. They meet a student named Edison Rukereft, who is accompanied by another student named Sarasa Lew Eila Lafolka, who resembles a little girl. Twin brothers Tygel and Leon Blouyer, and Ray Forester are the next new students to arrive. Naie is also now working at the school, having been sent by Beis to find Dorel's secret room earlier; Maynard is also revealed to be still alive and imprisoned. After Naie reveals what was in that room to Beis, she is sent to work undercover at the school as a teacher. Milea Renault Allozar Wers, Beis's daughter and princess of Boelate, consults with chairman Dean Cardinal Elro Romain regarding the school's progress. Klen senses great power in Ray as the latter gets into a fight with Tygel and Leon, hinting that he also uses Toah's magic. Ray defeats the brothers before Naie stops the fight and the brothers are sent to the teachers' office for using magic outside of class. Ray senses something off about Klen.
14	2	"Another World"; Transliteration: "Mōhitotsu no Sekai" (Japanese: もう一つの世界)	Makoto Sokuza	Makoto Sokuza	July 15, 2026
While introducing themselves as exchange students to the staff and current students of Solsein, Alicia and Klen use the aliases Alyssa Sleihunt and Klen Vatiss and claim that they are from Hiden. They begin their first lesson with Lang Feiss, a magic instructor, as Naie passes out magic wands. Rod, who is also undercover in the school as a teacher alongside Miquel, recognizes Klen and Alicia, though he thinks Alicia is someone else who resembles her. Naie isn't happy to see Klen and Alicia in the school too, and the two threaten her into not telling anyone about who they really are. After Naie demonstrates a spell, Klen makes Alicia try it, but she fails as she can't do magic. A student named Nathan Franc assures her otherwise while Ray and two other students named Mary Merryweather (or Mary Mary for short) and Andrew Hwyp succeed at the spell. When Tygel and Leon try next, they mess up when using the spell at the same time, forcing an angry Lang to end the lesson early. Mary Mary also threatens the brothers when they antagonize Nathan. Klen and Alicia resume their search for the hidden room, though Naie overhears them, which they are aware of. Nathan mysteriously vanishes the next day. Mary Mary interrogates Alicia before they both go to look for Nathan while Sarasa, Klen, and Edison spend time with each other. Alicia and Mary Mary discover Nathan's room wrecked and animal blood everywhere, and Alicia rushes off to find him. Meanwhile, Nathan finds himself in a strange realm where the salamander who works for Vorden tempts him into using the power of Toah; in reality, Nathan was actually transformed into a monster, who attacks Leon due to him seeing others as demons. Alicia and Tygel save Leon, but Alicia is unable to contact Klen for help. Mary Mary, immune to Nathan's sonic attacks, arrives and uses her powers to calm him, also revealing that it prevents outside forces from being alerted, which is why Alicia can't contact Klen. She defeats Nathan and turns him back to normal, having known of his transformation.
15	3	"The Hero Legend and the Village of Origin"; Transliteration: "Yūsha Denshō to Hajimari no Machi" (Japanese: 勇者伝承とはじまりの町)	Masamune Hirata	Noriaki Saitō	July 22, 2026
A thousand years ago, Clevatess discovers that his enemies are gone and Zavthier explains that there are no enemies left. Back in the present, Alicia is unhappy that Klen is spending time with Sarasa and Edison, and is forced to investigate the school herself. The other students keep their distance from her, except for Tygel and Leon, who inform her that Nathan is leaving the school. The two ask for Alicia to work with them and she agrees despite knowing how arrogant they are. Milea learns of what happened to Nathan. Alicia still can't dig up information as people are still refusing to talk to her, so she turns to Naie for help. After Alicia reveals Beis's plan, which will result in war against Eslinn with the school being the battleground. Naie reluctantly agrees to help her so that Alicia can save the school while Naie will get the secrets in Dorel's hidden room in return. Meanwhile, Yuriel learns of Rod and Miquel's progress in Solsein and Dean's motives. He then sends Owen to Haiden and to conquer Luna Mountain. In Haiden, Luna is learning magic with Nelluru and T'ala's help. Back in Solsein, a female student follows Klen, Sarasa, and Edison, but the three are aware of her presence and mislead her with decoys. Klen reveals that Sarasa is Orggite Shamaness Godspeaker, the next queen of the Orggites. She then summons Zavtheir, who reveals to Edison that Klen is really Clevatess. Taking control of Sarasa's body, she and Klen then reveal that Edison is really another Demon Lord named Rathwell, who is using a human body as a vessel. The three talk about Vorden's actions. Zavtheir reveals the history of the Hero Legend; Naie tells the same story to Alicia, who suspects that Dorel is aware of the Book and knows that there are more of them. Alicia then rushes off to find the hidden room, but notices Andrew in a greenhouse. She finds a strange snail and is transported to the same realm as Nathan where a giant skeleton traps her in a jar.
16	4	"The Dark Tower"; Transliteration: "Kuroi Tō" (Japanese: 黒い塔)	Kyounosuke Shibata	Noriaki Saitō	July 29, 2026
It is revealed that Alicia has also been turned into a dark beast just like Nathan, and due to the small size of her new form, she was put inside a jar by Andrew, whom she sees as a skeleton. She is also unable to be understood by Andrew and everyone else. It is also revealed that Dean is working for Vorden and was responsible for Nathan and Alicia's transformations using another Book of Toah. Vordein orders Dean to recover the other Books, including the one that Klen has. As Andrew brings Alicia to his lab, Klen senses he can no longer detect her. He, Zavtheir, and Rathwell become determined to stop Vorden's plans. Zavtheir reveals that Gart is with her, and she and Rathwell retake their human disguises after Klen removes the barrier hiding them. After days of fighting spiders, Alicia finds that the reason Andrew bought her to his lab was to be food for his carnivores plants. Gart visits Rod to discuss what they have found out about the school as well as students who temporally go missing, with Alicia being the next victim. Naie is also bothered by Alicia's disappearance as she fears of being punished for working with her. Unable to ask for help finding her, she decides to flee, but is caught by Klen, who is also looking for Alicia. Klen reveals his true appearance to force Naie to talk, leading her to become Klen's servant in return. Sensing that whoever is responsible for Alicia's disappearance wants the Book that he has, Klen heads outside and summons a dark tower near the school, daring people to try and take the Book from him, leading to the end of the flashback. Ray recognizes Klen and Dean, who had known that there are spies in the school, makes most of the students leave the scene in preparation to deal with Klen.
17	5	"Battle Against Oneself"; Transliteration: "Jibun to no Tatakai" (Japanese: 自分との戦い)	Ryōta Ono	Noriaki Saitō	August 5, 2026
Rod and Miquel also prepare to deal with Klen along with Dean and the students who are still outside. Zavtheir and Gart go to meet up Klen, who is tired of working undercover. Zavtheir reveals that she knows about Luna while warning him to not forget his role. Klen plans to draw attention so to lure out Vorden and so Alicia can escape while Zavtheir is determined to keep deaths at a minimum before she and Gart leave. Dean claims that Klen and Alicia are criminals who stole something from the school vaults and that they must obtain the Book from Klen. He summons Vorden, who grants the students his power as Dean convinces Ray to reveal his true power and gives Andrew a special task. Klen responds to the approaching teachers and students by summoning shadow vanguards. Alicia is still at the mercy of the carnivorous plants as they sap her strength to grow, but she is able to use this to make them break their tank, allowing her to escape. Alicia sees the mysterious snail, who transforms into a doppelganger of herself and tortures her, all while mocking her role as a hero. Despite her small size, Alicia is able to fight back and defeat the snail. A doorway suddenly appears before her as Dorel's voice tempts her into passing through, but Alicia sees through the trick as Dean, revealing his true form, emerges from the doorway and attacks her. Alicia also figures that he was using Dorel before she escapes, but Andrew catches her at Dean's direction and intends to kill her. Alicia unsuccessfully tries to get away as Andrew traps her in a plant and prepares to cut her head off.
18	6	"Whisper"; Transliteration: "Sasayaku Koe" (Japanese: 囁く声)	Makoto Sokuza	Tensai Okumura	August 12, 2026
Before Andrew can cut Alicia's head off, Rod arrives to question him. The students are struggling against Klen's monsters as Sarasa generates more mist to help Klen before going into hiding to recover. Andrew is able to identify Rod's past before the latter prepares to leave, but, due to his prior role in stopping Dorel, Vorden has Andrew attack Rod and trap him in a tree. Vorden's salamander tells Alicia the story of a true hero before the tree that she's trapped in crushes her. However, Alicia manages to break free thanks to her runic symbol and immortality, which Andrew wasn't aware of, and Rod reveals that he survived thanks to a weapon he has, which he made from the remains of Dorel’s sword. As the school is being evacuated, Naie and Mary Mary come under attack by the dark beasts, who cannot be killed so easily, but fire proves to be effective against them. Meanwhile, Owen leads a team into Klen's domain, but encounter monsters. Owen is able to slay the monsters, but most of his men are killed. He then goes to search for the weapons that the 13 heroes left behind there. Back at the school, the students are able to fight back and defeat the monsters. Vorden has the students go get the Book from Klen, but Naie cannot hear him. Rod is overpowered, but Gart saves him and warns Andrew about the consequences of using Vorden's power. Andrew dismisses this before Rod knocks him out. Gart reveals to Rod that the small beast that Andrew tried to kill is in fact Alicia, who can see him in his beast form. Gart demands that Alicia tells him everything.
19	7	"The Surface World and the Hidden World"; Transliteration: "Hyō no Sekai to Ura no Sekai" (Japanese: 表の世界と裏の世界)	Shūji Miyazaki	Yoshiyuki Asai	August 19, 2026
As the battle continues, Jazhak and his henchmen watch the battle from a distance, as they too are infiltrating the school, but not in disguise and intend to move at the right time. After Gart and Alicia locate Klen, they return to Rod and Gart speaks on Alicia's behalf as he can understand her in her beast form. Meanwhile, a group of cultists gather in a secret underground chamber while checking to see if all the students are asleep. Tygel and Leon subdue two of the cultists and disguise themselves as them so they can sneak into the chamber, but Edison also sneaks in disguised as a cult member, having overheard the two earlier. They discover that these cultists are from all three kingdoms and the cult is called the Union, who seek to recreate the Hero Legend. Dean is the leader of the Union. Meanwhile, Beis and Esliel grow suspicious of Solsein and Dorel's connection with Dean. Dean then removes his mask, revealing that he is actually Milea in disguise. A flashback reveals that years ago, Milea hasn't been herself after losing her mother. That is when Dorel arrived to request for the study of magic, which Milea overhears and follows Dorel, who instructs her to ask the mirror in her room, which resulted in Vorden manipulating her. Although this changed her, she is also given a Book of Toah and was taught how to use it by Dorel. Following the end of the flashback, Milea brings out the real Dean from a mirror and then re-banishes him. Rathwell intends to confront Vorden once he appears. Meanwhile, Alicia tells Rod more about her discoveries, with Gart translating for her. Alicia has Rod go destroy the Book that Dean, whom she doesn't know is really Milea, has before jumping into a crack in her side of the world to reach the secret chamber.
20	8	"Memories of a Friend"; Transliteration: "Tomo no Kioku" (Japanese: 友の記憶)	Masato Takeuchi & Kenta Yokoya	Masato Takeuchi & Kenta Yokoya	August 26, 2026
During the battle against Klen, Naie flees from a dark beast with an unconscious Mary Mary. She manages to wound the beast, only to be confronted by more of them and sees many students badly injured. A flashback shows Mary Mary witnessing her great aunt's death. When her family got into a long heated argument, Mary Mary left to gain power, which led to Vorden manipulating her. Naie also recalls her own backstory before managing to kill most of the monsters. Mary Mary wakes up and kills the rest, but the usage of Vorden's power weakens her. Mary Mary's soul, along with those that were slain, are drawn to the school. Ray goes to fight Klen and demands to know who he really is. Ray mentions Shiro, the boy who saved Luna and the human form that Klen is assuming, who had saved Ray and his family from a dark beast in the past. Shiro's actions led the two to form a friendship. Ray also intends to go to Solsein one day to become a hero. Once Ray learned about Clevatess's attack on Hiden, Shiro was killed, which devastates both Ray and Shiro's father. After the flashback ends, Klen confesses that he did indeed kill Shiro, but it was unintentional. Ray is overpowered, but is still determined to avenge Shiro. However, Klen ultimately wins the fight and reveals that he is Demon Lord Clevatess. However, Ray distracts Klen to allow Vorden (in his lizard form) to steal his Book.
21	9	"The Mirror Labyrinth"; Transliteration: "Kagami no Meikyū" (Japanese: 鏡の迷宮)	Ryōta Ono	Noriaki Saitō	September 2, 2026
Vorden escapes with Klen's Book. Meanwhile, Alicia is still traveling through the cracks, but upon making it through, she returns to normal and gets stuck. Klen helps her break free and heal her injuries upon landing at the bottom of a cavern, but her clothes are badly torn. Alicia discovers that she is in some kind of torture chamber, known as the Chamber of Secrets. She is forced to continue on without Klen's help and with little clothing, but finds herself in a loop. Back outside, the dark tower collapses and Klen stops Ray's soul from being claimed, before learning from Zavtheir that Vorden is obsessed with the Hero Legend regarding the hero that he last fought. Gart arrives and reveals that he located Alicia, who is in the Chamber of Secrets. Klen attempts to find her while Zavtheir and Gart look after the students, though they wonder how Klen will handle things. Back in the torture chamber, Alicia soon discovers in the restraint chair in the middle of the room, bound and gagged, is the real Milea; the Milea leading the cult is really Dean taking her appearance. Meanwhile, the cult prepares to enter the Chamber of Secrets as Dean uses his Book to summon Vorden himself. Vorden hands Dean Klen's book, which he uses to bring them all to the deepest part of the Chamber of Secrets: the Mirror Labyrinth. Dorel was the only one to have ever been allowed to enter. Dean reveals that he has all five Books of Toah which he uses to summon five doors to locations of where the Books were originally found, intending to use them to revive the hero. The first door leads to a shrine with a stone coffin containing the hero's body, but the door is damaged. He also senses that someone has infiltrated the labyrinth and sends cult members to get rid of the intruder and Milea. Tygel and Leon go with those cultists so they can slip away. Alicia is ambushed by puppets sent by Dean, but she manages to defeat them and escape with Milea, who reveals that Dean also altered her life memories and trapped her in the Mirror Labyrinth, yet she maintains her true form while here. The two manage to elude the cultists using a door trick that Milea discovered before and meet up with Tygel and Leon in a hallway made of mirrors. After informing the brothers about Vorden's plan, a bug monster inside the mirrors approaches and after the floor gives way, Alicia sacrifices herself to save Milea as she falls down into a dark pit where she encounters the bug monster again.
22	10	"Second Trial"; Transliteration: "Daini no Shiren" (Japanese: 第二の試練)	Makoto Sokuza	Makoto Sokuza	September 9, 2026
Alicia discovers that the bug monster, the Chimera Queen, is the one who created the puppets, made from the kidnapped babies. Two of the cultists catch up to her and explain that the babies are orphaned. The cult plans to use the souls of the babies and Solsein's students to revive the hero. Alicia attacks one of the cultists out of anger while the Chimera Queen kills the other. Dean arrives and, aware of Alicia's background, traps her in a mirror prison. Meanwhile, Rathwell visits Vorden to question his motives, having watched his past war against the hero before. Vorden refuses to answer him and the two fight. Eventually, Vorden takes on a human form and decides to show Rathwell instead. After clearing away the cultists trying to fix the broken door, Vorden fixes the door himself and enters the shrine where the hero's body is. Dean senses Vorden's actions and summons the Ancient One to devour Alicia inside the mirror prison. Dean then takes on a demonic form. As Dean prepares to leave, Alicia frees herself from the prison with a Regalia that she found in the Ancient One's stomach and kills the Chimera Queen. Alicia also warns Dean that Klen is approaching. Back in Hiden, the forge has returned. Luna reunites with Klen along with T'ala, Nelluru, and Favio; Luna is now able to speak. T'ala senses that Luna possesses special powers. Klen notices four other ancient locations appearing, which are also noticed by others, and deducts that they and the forge are based on the hero's legend. The prison that Dorel made in his attempt to trap Klen earlier shatters, allowing Klen to regain his full power. As Nelluru and T'ala head to safely, Klen enters the forge and gains access to the labyrinth with Luna's help. After sensing Klen's arrival, Dean traps Alicia in another mirror prison where he forces her to fight an illusion of her father Margo to escape. Vorden and Rathwell also sense Klen's arrival and Vorden begins his process to revive the hero before going to confront Klen.
23	11	"What's Reflected in the Mirror"; Transliteration: "Kagami ni Utsuru Mono" (Japanese: 鏡に映るもの)	Masamune Hirata	Noriaki Saitō	September 16, 2026
As Alicia fights Margo, Klen fights Vorden and deducts that he was the one who made the King of Hiden, who was under Vorden's control around that time, attack his domain. Vorden states that he intends to destroy Toah, but refuses to explain why he wants to revive the hero legend. Klen is unable to take his true form in this dimension. Meanwhile, Alicia sees through the trickery, but fails to defeat Margo. Instead of killing her, Margo carries her off as Dean watches them; Alicia is unable to contact Klen for help. At Margo's home, Alicia meets her mother and her scarred left eye seemly heals. Alicia is starting to feel better, but isn't aware that Dean is toying with her, knowing that she can't resist her loved ones and hopes that she will eventually die in the mirror prison's simulation. Elsewhere in the labyrinth, Milea, Tygel, and Leon are still eluding the puppets and Milea suspects that she was manipulated by her alternate persona, who is possessing Dean. Tygel and Leon reveal that their own father disowned them for being too identical and now they seek to take over his position. After being knocked out, Alica recalls her past where her mother died before she reached adulthood, but not before encouraging Alicia to explore and become a hero. Back at the school, Ray wakes up alongside other unconscious students who had lost their souls and meets Sarasa, Naie, and Mary Mary, who had her soul returned by Zavtheir, but she has lost her rune. Ray still has his runes on account of the trials that he faced in the Mirror Labyrinth. Alicia is prepared to fight Margo again, but he and his wife instead give her some encouragement and bid her farewell, resulting in the mirror prison shattering. Alicia proceeds to fight Dean, who is enraged that the trap failed and was forced to destroy the simulation.
24	12	"The Millennium of a Lord of Dark Beasts"; Transliteration: "Majūō no Chitose" (Japanese: 魔獣王の千年)	Ryōta Ono	Tensai Okumura	September 23, 2026
Dean attacks Alicia with the shards of the mirror prison. Meanwhile, Klen and Vorden prove to be equally matched. Klen remembers from his past that Vorden was the one who defeated the hero who slayed him before he was revived by Zavtheir, who was currently possessing a pregnant priestess at that time. Klen is eventually overpowered. Their battle reveals an ancient land below them in the Mirror Labyrinth, which is Toah itself and is also the cause of the world's curses. The five doors are part of a large temple. In a flashback, Vorden reveals his past war with the warriors of Toah. He possessed the body of a hero that he killed to investigate. He eventually met a hero named Write, who seeks to eliminate Toah for its wicked deeds and for forcing people to fight in exchange for their freedom. Vorden hesitates to kill him and instead decided to help him so he can dig up more dirt on Toah. However, Write is also a hero summoned by Toah and intends to finish writing a book once his goal is finished. After learning that Clevatess and Rathwell were slain, Vorden ordered all Dark Beasts to attack Toah and meets up with Write at the temple with the five doors. He learns that Write killed the people of Toah due to their heartless nature, revealing that it was he who wrote the five Books of Toah. Write also reveals that he killed himself and tasks Vorden with completing his story. Vorden is unwilling to let him die and puts him in the shrine to save him, revealing that Write was the hero mentioned in the Hero Legend. Back in the present, Rathwell watches the fight and Write comes back to life just as Vorden finishes off Klen.
25	13	"True Hero"; Transliteration: "Shin no Yūsha" (Japanese: 真の勇者)	Takurō Tsukada	Noriaki Saitō	September 30, 2026
As Milea, Tygel and Leon watch Alicia fight Dean through a trapdoor, the three help her. Dean is eventually overpowered, but Milea appears and tries to reason with her, merging together with her alternate self. Milea thanks them for freeing her and reveals that Vorden is the true mastermind behind this. They return to the real world and discover that Toah is approaching. Alicia heads to Toah to help Klen and sees him being beaten down by Vorden. Klen reveals that Write is just a puppet like the other residents of Toah. Klen eventually manages to take his true form and defeat Vorden. Rathwell separates from Edison, but is then eaten by the revived Write, who is possessed by the spirit of Toah itself. Zavthier and Gart approach the city. Vorden is killed by Write and Klen eventually manages to kill Write. As Vorden fades away, Klen is aware that his revival will take a while. Alicia and Klen reunite with Milea, Tygel, Leon, and Edison. Klen then goes to check on Luna and leaves a special sword for Alicia. Zavthier then reveals the truth behind Toah, though the group are warned that Zavthier may become an enemy based on their actions. Dean is then revived, now free from the alternate Milea's control; however, a war may break out if people found out that Milea was responsible for this. Alicia tells them about Toah and that Dean was the true mastermind behind this in order to protect Milea, and Naie leaves to inform Beis. Alicia reveals her true identity to the students before leaving and wonders about those who knows Klen's true form. Meanwhile, Beis is outraged that Jazhak escaped. Alicia suddenly collapses; it turns out Klen had his heart ripped out by Jazhak and with him dead, Alicia also dies. After five years pass, an older Sarasa comes to Klen's tower and finds an older Luna watching over the Dark Beasts until Klen revives.
