= Black Prada Dress =

- Acoustic version cover

Single by Ellie Goulding

from the album I Know Too Much
- Released: 5 June 2026
- Genre: Pop; synth-pop
- Length: 3:18
- Label: Polydor
- Songwriters: Ellie Goulding; Jack Rochon; Evan Blair; James Essein
- Producer: Jack Rochon

Ellie Goulding singles chronology
"Destiny" (2025)	"Black Prada Dress" (2026)	"Hush" (2026)

Visualiser
- "Black Prada Dress" on YouTube

"Black Prada Dress" is a song by English singer-songwriter Ellie Goulding. It was released on 5 June 2026, through Polydor Records as the lead single from her sixth studio album, I Know Too Much (2026). It was written by Goulding, Jack Rochon, Evan Blair, and James Essein, with Rochon handling its production.

== Background and composition ==
Described in a press release as a "self-aware portrait of the fractured selves we construct to survive", "Black Prada Dress" was written by Goulding and produced by Jack Rochon, whom she discovered on TikTok. Goulding said the song "sets the tone" for her sixth studio album, I Know Too Much, which was inspired by the idea that "maybe we can know too much".

"Black Prada Dress" is a synth-pop and electronic-leaning pop song characterised by airy vocals and a dance-oriented production.

== Promotion and release ==
On 23 May, 2026, Goulding debuted "Black Prada Dress"—the lead single from her sixth studio album, I Know Too Much (2026)—on BBC Radio 1's Big Weekend at Herrington Country Park. Same month, she uploaded a teaser featuring a snippet of the track, where she is seen looking through a rack of black dresses. Alongside the album's announcement on 2 June, the single was revealed to be released on 5 June. She also performed the song at BBC Two on 7 June, featuring English pianist Jools Holland.

== Charts ==
Chart performance
Chart (2026)	Peak position
Latvia Airplay (TopHit)	200
Lithuania Airplay (TopHit)	287
UK Singles Downloads (Official Charts)	98

== Release history ==
Release dates and formats
Region	Date	Format(s)	Label	Ref.
Various	5 June 2026	Digital download; streaming	Polydor	
Italy	16 June 2026	Radio airplay	EMI	
