= Stereoboard =

Music website established in 2002

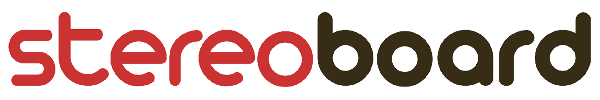
- Website type: Music website
- Available in: English
- Founded: 2002
- Headquarters: {{{location_country}}}
- Country of origin: Cardiff, United Kingdom
- Owner: Nigel Sachdev
- Creator: Stereophonics
- Founder: Eyedigit Limited
- Website: stereoboard.com
- Launched: 2002; 24 years ago (re-launched: 2009; 17 years ago)
- Current status: Active

Stereoboard is a UK-based music news and event ticket comparison website founded in 2002 in Cardiff, Wales. Owned and founded by Nigel Sachdev, it originated as the official website of the band Stereophonics before transitioning into a rock and pop music news platform, and was relaunched in 2009.

Since expanding into event ticketing, Stereoboard has become one of Europe's leading concert ticket comparison sites, as it serves millions of users each month. The site aggregates listings from official ticket agencies and secondary marketplaces, and also publishes music news, interviews, reviews, and features. The website is developed and maintained by Eyedigit Limited.

== History ==
Stereoboard was founded by Pontypridd-born Welsh entrepreneur Nigel Sachdev in 2002. It was made in his backroom as a meeting place for Stereophonics fans.

In 2011, Stereoboard launched a short film, titled Access All Areas, as part of an anti–ticket scam campaign led by the UK Office of Fair Trading (OFT). Co-produced with Media Wales, the video aimed to raise awareness of fraudulent ticketing websites and promote reputable online ticket platforms, following OFT figures indicating that one in twelve people purchasing concert tickets online had encountered scams. In the same year, it entered into a partnership with See Tickets, one of the largest UK-owned ticketing companies, designating it as the website's preferred primary ticket seller.

== Influence ==
In 2011, Stereoboard compiled a blacklist of more than 50 pop-up websites involved in fraudulent ticket sales, warning that thousands of music fans could suffer financial losses as a result of ticketing scams. The initiative highlighted industry estimates that ticket fraud cost the music sector nearly £170 million annually. As part of broader efforts to combat ticket fraud, promoters Live Nation and Festival Republic also agreed to comply with a police request to expedite the delivery of tickets to consumers.

As of 2013, Stereoboard attracted more than 1.6 million monthly hits, placing it close to established music outlets such as Kerrang!, BBC Music, and The Guardian's music section. It compared ticket prices for over 26,000 events on a daily basis, with annual ticket sales through the platform exceeding £5 million.
