= Sean Leon =

Canadian musician (born 1991)

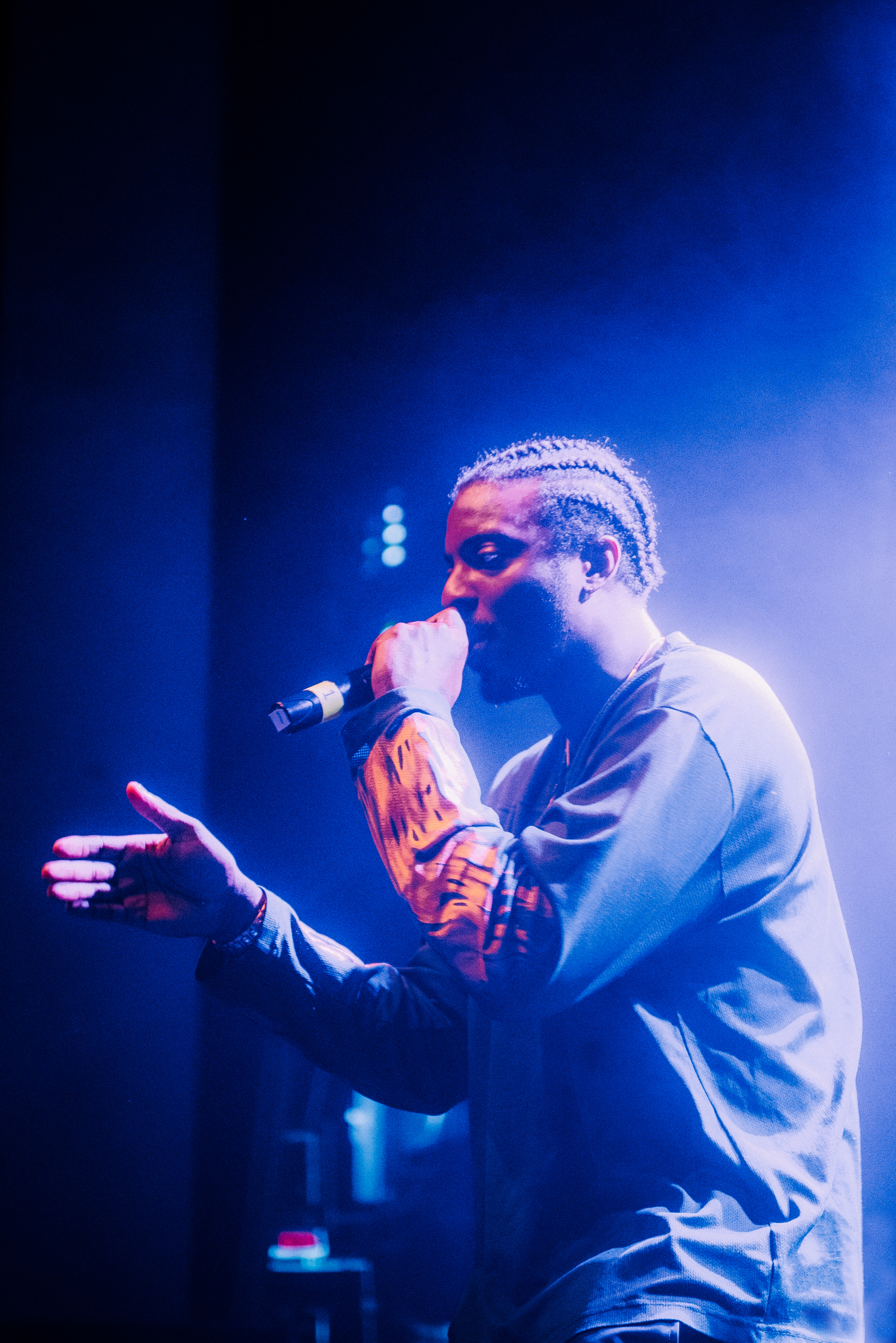
- Leon in 2017, at The Come Up Show in Toronto

Background information
- Also known as: Maui Slim
- Born: Matthew Sean Leon; May 23, 1991 (age 34); Toronto, Ontario, Canada
- Genres: Canadian hip-hop; punk rock
- Occupations: Rapper; singer; songwriter; record producer
- Years active: 2013–present
- Label: IXXI Initiative
- Website: seanleon.co

Matthew Sean Leon (born May 23, 1991) is a Canadian rapper, singer, and record producer from Toronto, Ontario. He founded the record label IXXI Initiative in 2012, which fostered the career of fellow Toronto native Daniel Caesar. Leon is perhaps best known for co-writing Justin Bieber's 2021 single "Peaches", which peaked atop both the Canadian Hot 100 and Billboard Hot 100 and received four Grammy Award nominations. Leon has also co-written tracks on the albums Jesus is King (2019), Donda (2021), Donda 2 (2022), and Vultures 1 (2024) by American rapper Kanye West.

== Career ==
In July 2013, Leon released his debut mixtape Ninelevenne, the Tragedy followed by his second project Narcissus, the Drowning of Ego on January 22, 2014. Both projects featured production by Jordan Evans. Shortly after the release of Narcissus, Leon began the year-long roll out of the compilation King Of The Wild Things.

In February 2017, Leon released his first studio album I Think You've Gone Mad (Or the Sins of the Father). On November 29, 2017, Leon released an audio-film titled "C.C.W.M.T.T". This was followed with Sean Leon (The Death Of) in 2018.

In 2021, God's Algorithm had a non-traditional album release, with no streaming service involved, and only available for purchase on a beta landing page where users interacted through visuals, audio files, NFTs, and apparel. In 2023, he released the soundtrack album In Loving Memory prior to the film "House of Leon"'s release.

Following his appearance on Daniel Caesar's Pilgrim's Paradise EP in April 2016, Leon released the self-produced "Matthew in the Middle" featuring Caesar with production from Jovi, Jordan Evans and Jack Rochon, it was featured on the soundtrack for HBO's Insecure. Leon and Caesar's collaborations continued on Caesar's 2017 album Freudian and the following release Case Study 01 in 2019. Leon also has released several WondaGurl-produced songs as well as working with fellow Toronto artists like River Tiber and Jazz Cartier.

In 2019, Leon had a demo titled "The Glade" under his own artist project. While working on Daniel Caesar's Case Study 01 in Los Angeles, fellow collaborator River Tiber recommended sharing the demo with Ye at one of West's Sunday Service performances. This led to Leon writing parts of "Selah", "Jesus Is Lord", the chorus on "Use This Gospel" and contributing to the track sequencing for West's 9th studio album Jesus Is King. "The Glade" became "Up from the Ashes" and was released on the deluxe edition release of West's album Donda, garnering him a co-writing and production credit on the track. He also was credited on Justin Bieber's song "Peaches". Leon has also been a guest writer for the TV series Utopia Falls.

He co-wrote the opening track "Stars" from ¥$' debut studio album Vultures 1.

In Loving Memory was a longlisted nominee for the 2024 Polaris Music Prize.

Leon collaborated again with Caesar on Caesar's 2025 album Son of Spergy on the track "Emily's Song" as both a producer and a writer.

== Discography ==
Studio albums

- I Think You've Gone Mad (Or the Sins of the Father) (2017)
- C.C.W.M.T.T. (2017)
- Sean Leon (The Death Of) (2018)
- In Loving Memory (2023)

Compilation albums

- King of the Wild Things (2014)

Mixtapes

- Ninelevenne, the Tragedy (2013)
- Narcissus, The Drowning of Ego (2014)
- God's Algorithm (2021)
- HERD IMMUNITY (2022)

Extended plays

- 大切の想いで (2023)
- KING & SUFFERIN (2023)

== Awards and nominations ==
Award	Year	Work	Category	Result	Ref.
Grammy Awards	2022	"Peaches"	Song of the Year	Nominated	
Grammy Awards	2022	Justice (Triple Chucks Deluxe)	Album of the Year	Nominated	
Polaris Music Prize	2024	In Loving Memory	—	Longlisted	
Juno Awards	2025	"Gravity"	Music Video of the Year	Pending	
