= List of songs recorded by Ellie Goulding =

Songs by English singer

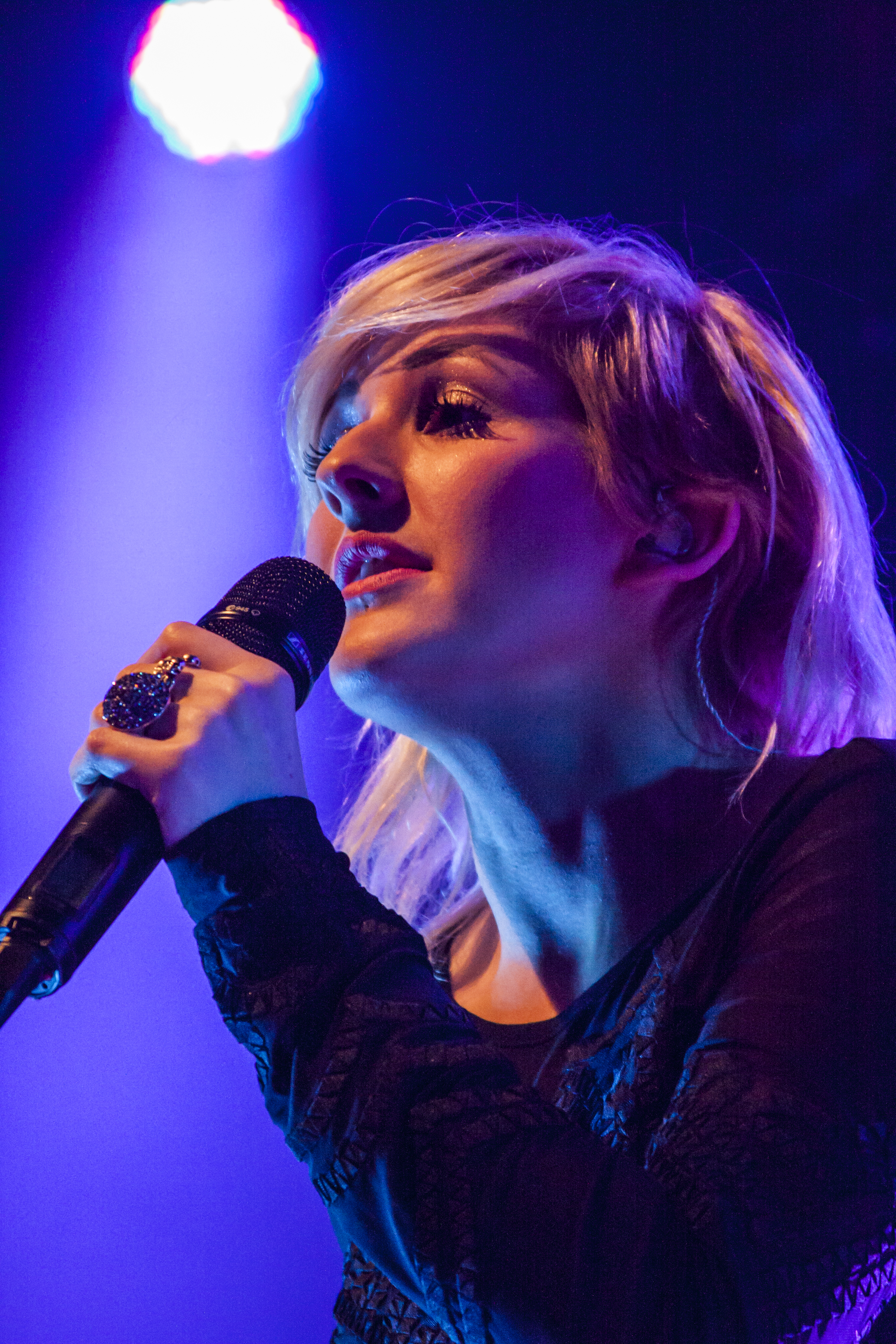
Goulding performing at Manchester Academy in December 2012

The English singer Ellie Goulding has recorded songs for five studio albums and guest features. After signing a contract with record label Polydor Records in July 2009, Goulding began to work on her debut studio album, Lights, which was ultimately released in February 2010. The first single released from the album was "Under the Sheets", which Goulding wrote in collaboration with Starsmith. Starsmith co-wrote four other songs and served as the album's primary producer. Goulding also collaborated with Jonny Lattimer on the singles "Starry Eyed" and "The Writer", and shared writing credits with Fraser T. Smith on "Your Biggest Mistake". In November 2010, the singer re-released Lights as Bright Lights, which included the standard version of the album and several new songs. She collaborated with Richard Stannard and Ash Howes on "Lights" and recorded a cover version of Elton John's "Your Song". At this time, Goulding also contributed guest vocals on the song "Wonderman" for Tinie Tempah's debut studio album Disc-Overy (2010).

Goulding released her second studio album, Halcyon, in October 2012. In addition to reuniting with writers with whom she had previously worked, the singer collaborated with several new writers and producers. The album's lead single, "Anything Could Happen", was co-written by Goulding and Jim Eliot. They also wrote six other songs for the album. Goulding collaborated with Lattimer on the single "Figure 8"; she co-wrote "Explosions" with John Fortis and with Starsmith on "Dead in the Water". She also appeared as a featured artist on "I Need Your Love" by Calvin Harris from his third studio album 18 Months (2012). In August 2013, Halcyon was reissued as Halcyon Days. It was preceded by the single "Burn", which Goulding co-wrote with Ryan Tedder, Brent Kutzle, Noel Zancanella and Greg Kurstin.

== Songs ==
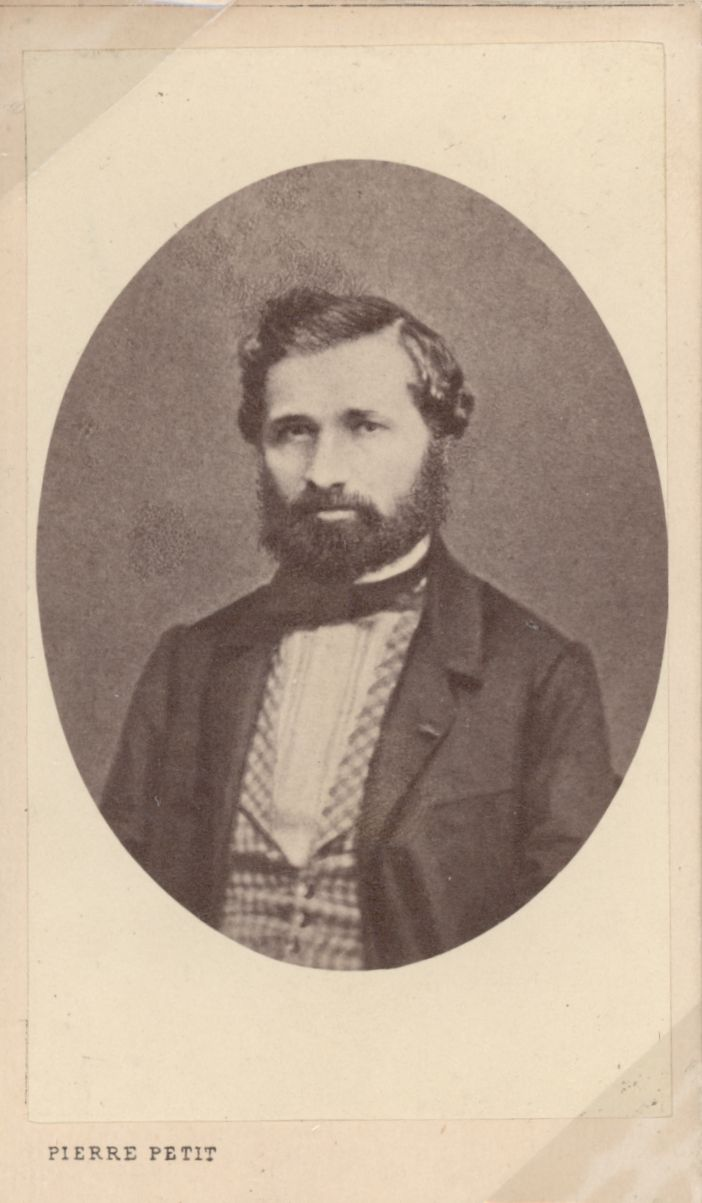
Goulding has covered "O Holy Night", a song composed by Adolphe Adam (pictured).

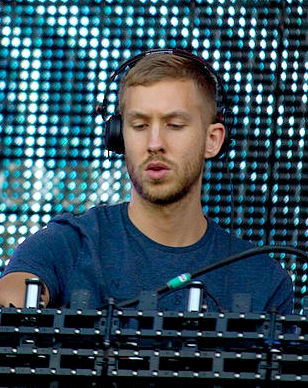
Scottish DJ Calvin Harris (pictured) has teamed up with Goulding on the singles: "I Need Your Love", "Outside", "Miracle", and "Free".

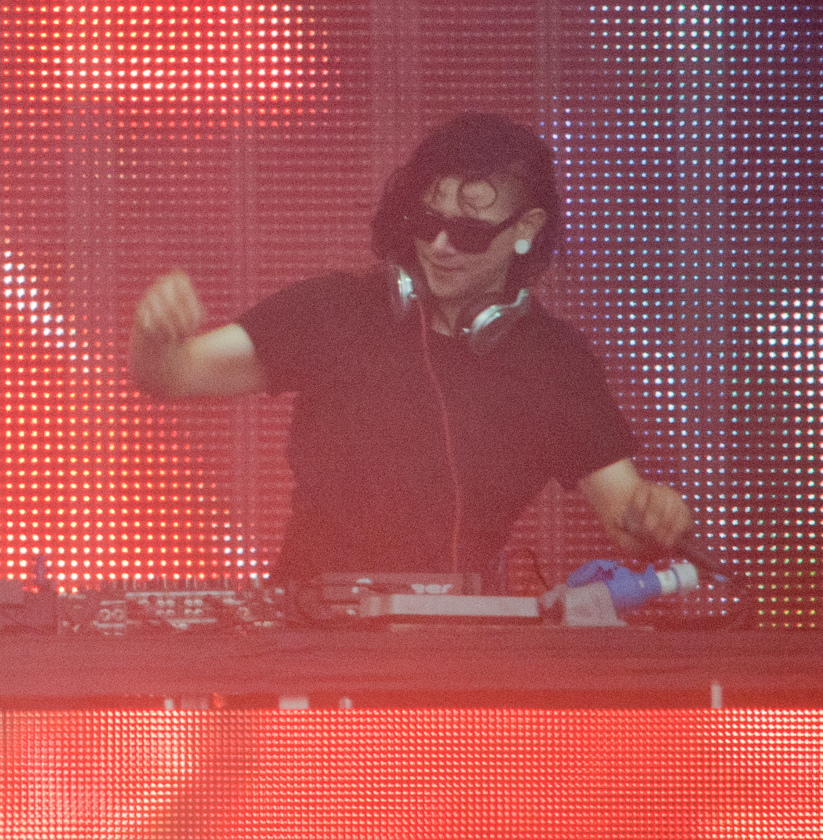
Skrillex's (pictured) collaborated with Goulding on the songs "Bittersweet", and "Summit".

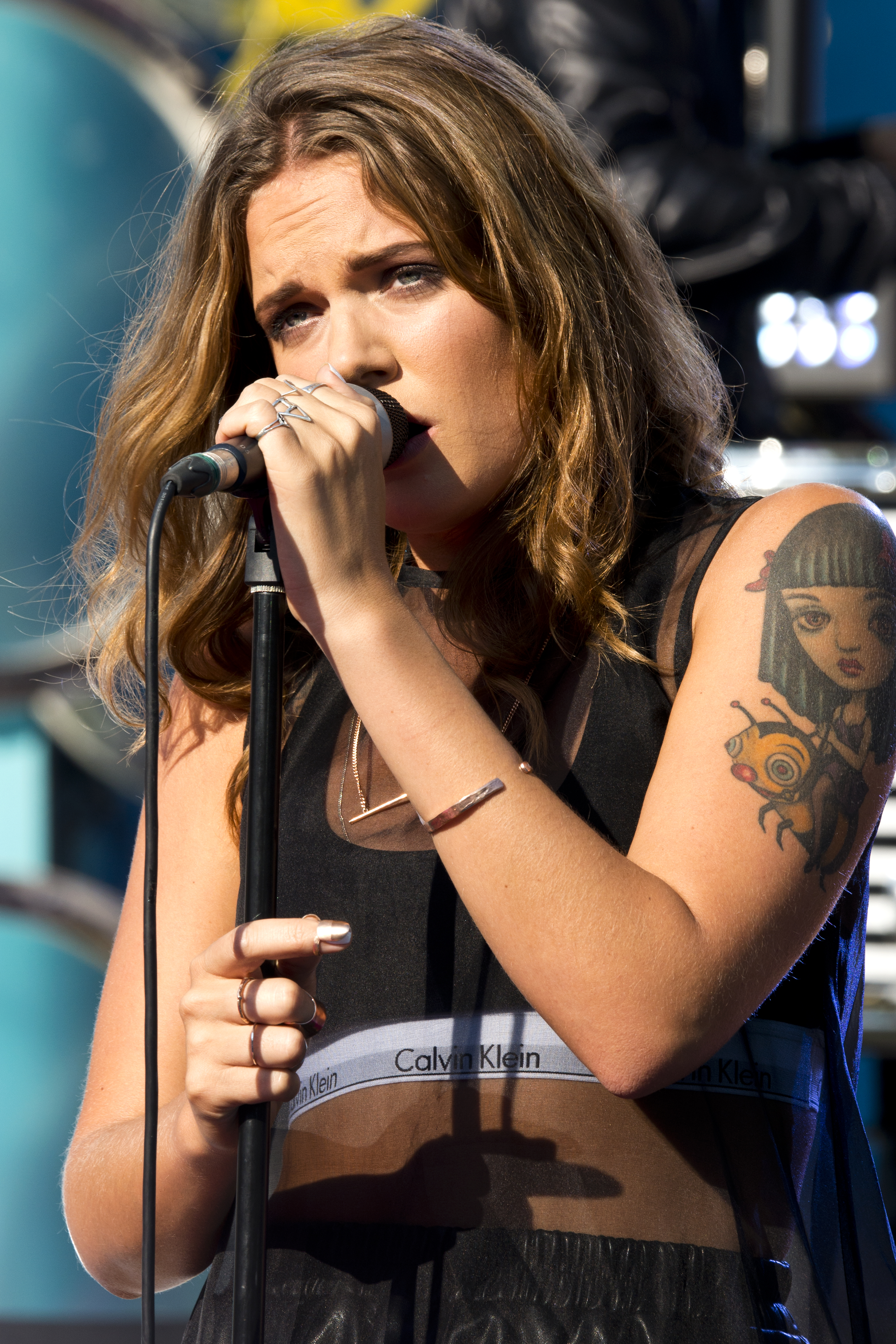
Tove Lo has collaborated twice with Goulding on the singles: "Love Me like You Do" (2015) and "Still Falling for You" (2016) as a songwriter.

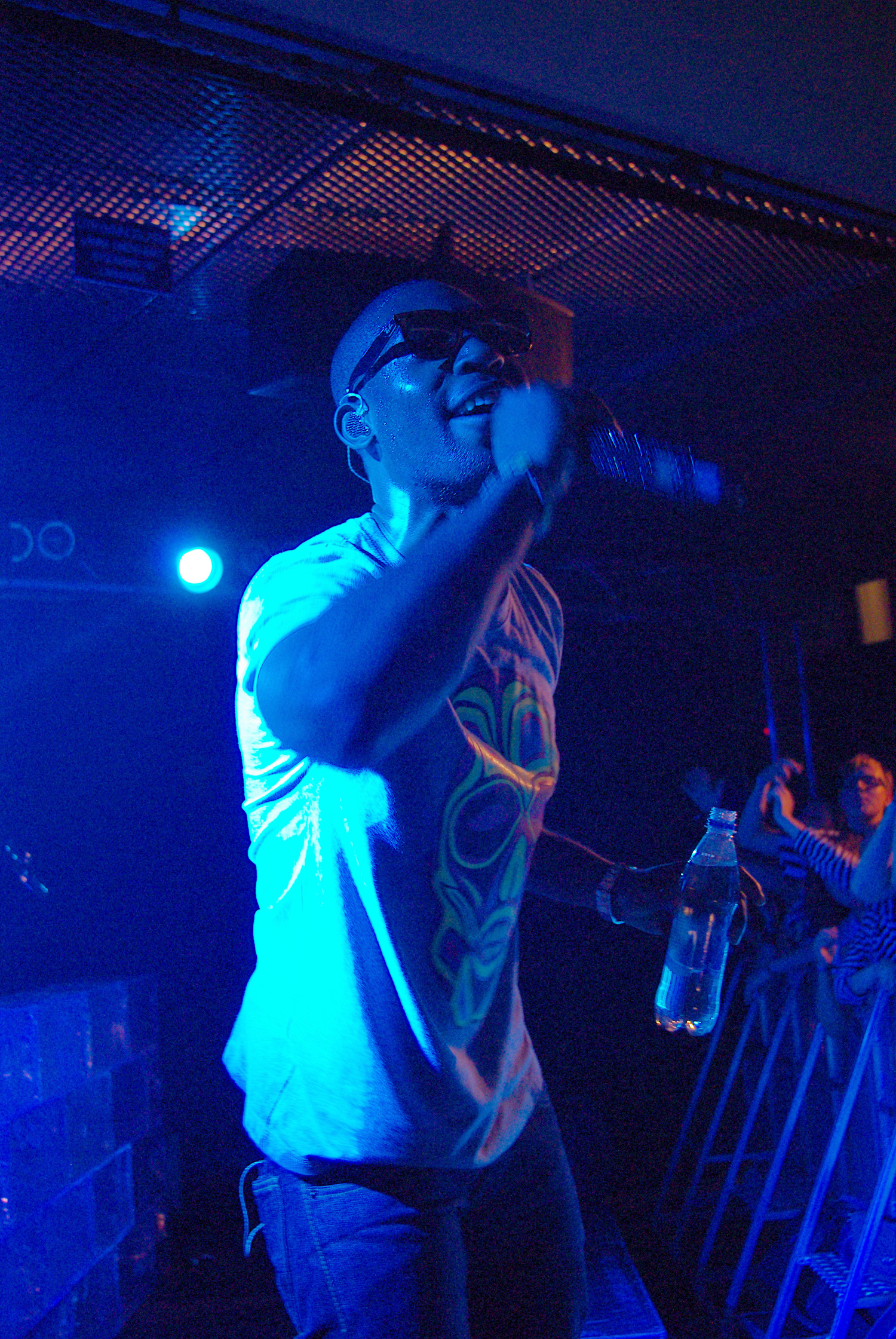
Goulding appeared as a featured artist on Tinie Tempah's (pictured) "Wonderman" (2011), meanwhile Tempah featured on Goulding's single "Hanging On" (2012).

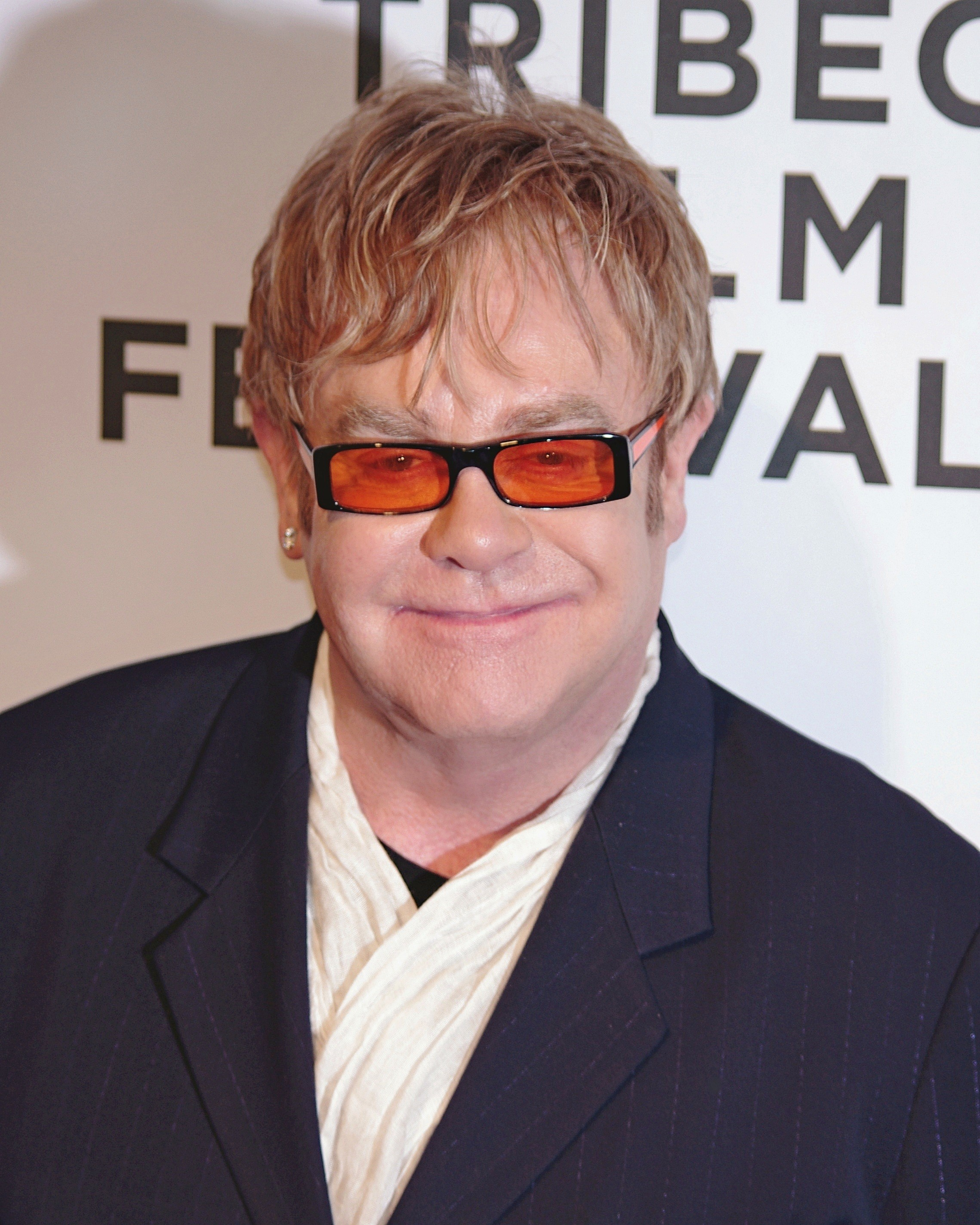
Goulding recorded a cover version of Elton John's (pictured) "Your Song" for the re-release of her debut studio album Bright Lights (2010).

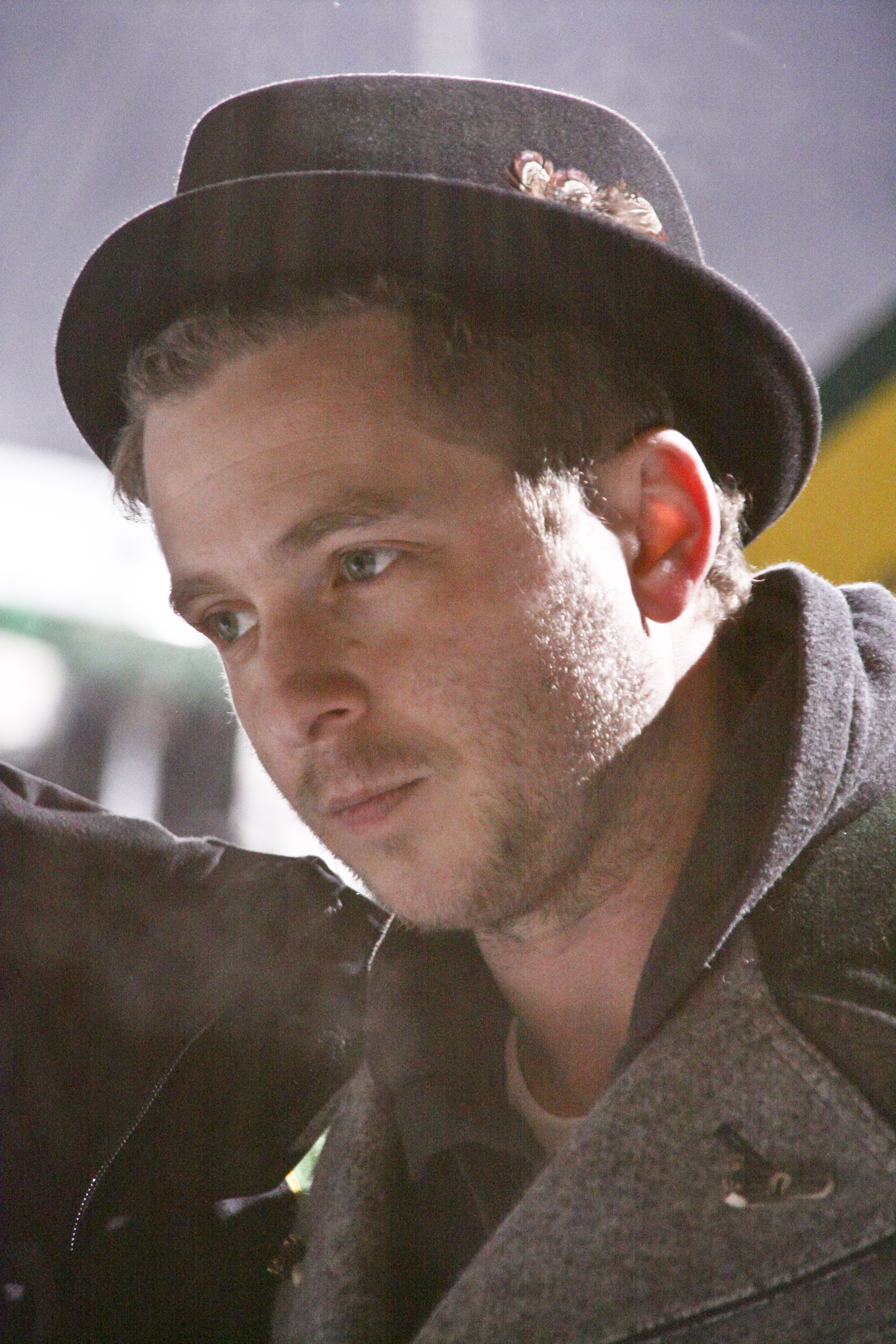
Ryan Tedder (pictured) co-wrote the single "Burn" for Goulding's album Halcyon Days (2013).

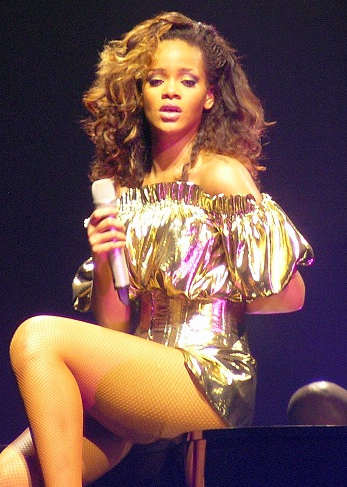
Goulding has covered Rihanna's (pictured) "Only Girl (In the World)".

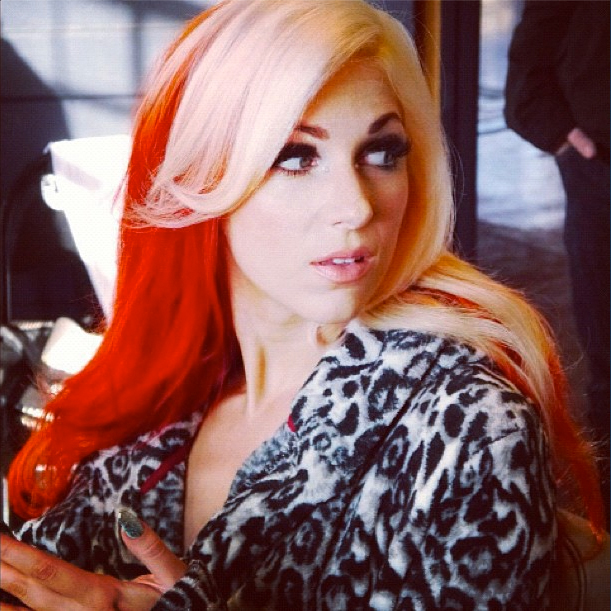
Bonnie McKee (pictured) collaborated with Goulding on "Under Control" for the album Halcyon Days (2013).

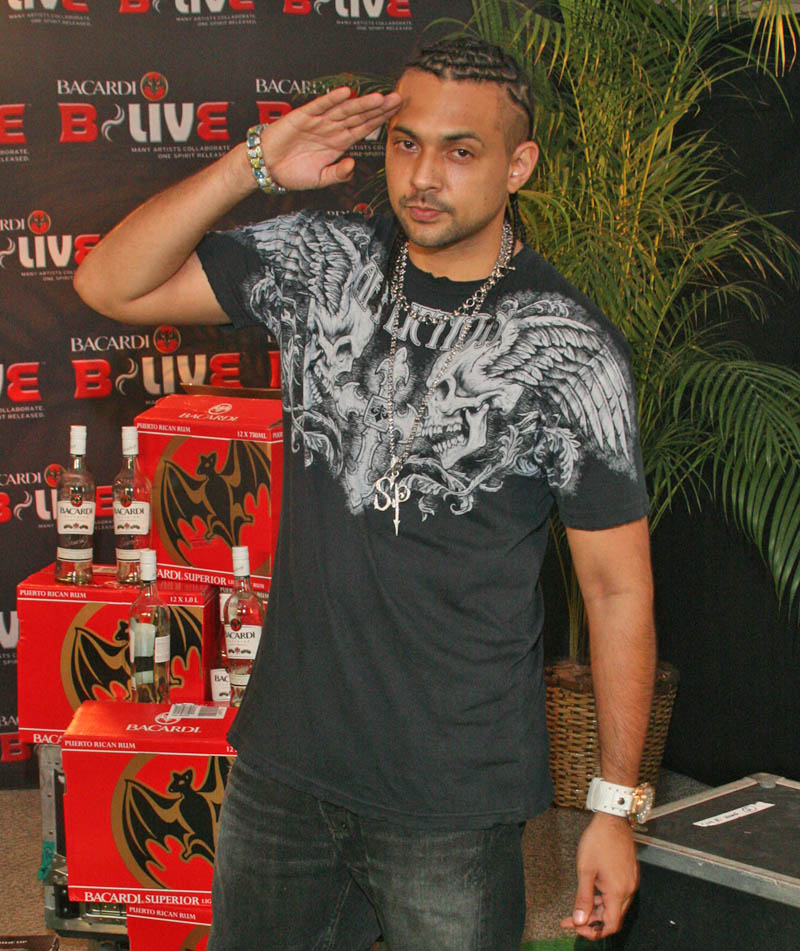
Sean Paul (pictured) collaborated with Goulding on the song "Bad Love" for his debut extended play Mad Love the Prequel (2018).

Key
†	Indicates single release
#	Indicates promotional single release

Song	Artist(s)	Writer(s)	Album(s)	Year	Ref.
"4 Seasons" †	Ellie Goulding	Ellie Goulding; Jack Rochon; Tyler Spry; Kiddo A.I. Jon Byron	I Know Too Much	2026	
"Aftertaste"	Ellie Goulding	Ellie Goulding; Greg Kurstin	Delirium	2015	
"Always Think of You"	Ellie Goulding	Ellie Goulding; Mags Duval; Jake Torrey; Adam Yaron	I Know Too Much	2026	
"All By Myself" †	Ellie Goulding	Ellie Goulding; Alok; Andrew Wells; Anthony Rossomando; Martin Gore; OHYES; Tom Mann	Higher Than Heaven	2023	
"All the Time"	Ellie Goulding	Ellie Goulding; Jack Rochon	We Know Too Much	2026	
"Animal"	Ellie Goulding	Ellie Goulding; Starsmith	Bright Lights	2010	
"Anything Could Happen" †	Ellie Goulding	Ellie Goulding; Jim Eliot	Halcyon	2012	
"Army" †	Ellie Goulding	Ellie Goulding; Max Martin; Savan Kotecha; Ali Payami	Delirium	2015	
"Around U"	Ellie Goulding	Ellie Goulding; Joe Janiak; Fred Gibson; Tristan Landymore	Delirium	2015	
"Atlantis"	Ellie Goulding	Ellie Goulding; Jim Eliot	Halcyon	2012	
"Baby"	Four Tet featuring Ellie Goulding	Ellie Goulding; Kieran Hebden	Sixteen Oceans	2020	
"Bad Love"	Sean Paul featuring Ellie Goulding	Sean Paul Henriques; Zacharie Raymond; Ben Ebele; Malcolm Olangundoye; Yannick Rastogi; Fred Ebele; Carla Marie Williams; Asia Whiteacre	Mad Love the Prequel	2018	
"Beating Heart" †	Ellie Goulding	Ellie Goulding; Joe Janiak	Divergent: Original Motion Picture Soundtrack	2014	
"Believe Me"	Ellie Goulding	Ellie Goulding; Crispin Hunt; Rob Blake	Bright Lights	2010	
"Better Man"	Ellie Goulding	Ellie Goulding; Jack Patterson; Jussifer; Tayla Parx	Higher Than Heaven	2023	
"Bittersweet"	Ellie Goulding	Sonny Moore; Ellie Goulding	The Twilight Saga: Breaking Dawn – Part 2 (Original Motion Picture Soundtrack)	2012	
"Black Prada Dress" †	Ellie Goulding	Ellie Goulding; Jack Rochon; Evan Blair; James Essein	I Know Too Much	2026	
"Bleach"	Ellie Goulding	Ellie Goulding; Joe Kearns	Brightest Blue	2020	
"Brightest Blue"	Ellie Goulding	Ellie Goulding; Joe Kearns; Jim Eliot	Brightest Blue	2020	
"Burn" †	Ellie Goulding	Ryan Tedder; Ellie Goulding; Greg Kurstin; Noel Zancanella; Brent Kutzle	Halcyon Days	2013	
"By the End of the Night" †	Ellie Goulding	Ellie Goulding; Trey Campbell; Stephen Kozmeniuk	Higher Than Heaven	2023	
"Capture the Flag"	Junkie XL featuring Ellie Goulding	Junkie XL	Divergent: Original Motion Picture Score	2014	
"Choosing Dauntless"	Junkie XL featuring Ellie Goulding	Junkie XL	Divergent: Original Motion Picture Score	2014	
"Close to Me" †	Ellie Goulding and Diplo featuring Swae Lee	Ellie Goulding; Ilya Salmanzadeh; K Brown; Peter Svensson; Savan Kotecha; Thomas Wesley Pentz	Brightest Blue	2018	
"Codes"	Ellie Goulding	Ellie Goulding; Max Martin; Savan Kotecha; Ilya	Delirium	2015	
"Cure for Love"	Ellie Goulding	Ellie Goulding; Andrew Wells; Anthony Rossomando; Tom Mann	Higher Than Heaven	2023	
"Cyan"	Ellie Goulding	Ellie Goulding; Joe Kearns; Jim Eliot; Starsmith	Brightest Blue	2020	
"A Day at a Time"	Matthew Herbert featuring Ellie Goulding	Matthew Herbert	Life in a Day	2011	
"Dead in the Water"	Ellie Goulding	Ellie Goulding; Fin Dow-Smith	Halcyon	2012	
"Destiny" †	Ellie Goulding	Ellie Goulding; Jack Rochon; Livvi Franc; Kurtis Wells	You Know Too Much	2025	
"Devotion"	Ellie Goulding	Ellie Goulding; Klas Åhlund; Ali Payami; Stephen Wrabel	Delirium	2015	
"Do You Remember"	Ellie Goulding	Ellie Goulding; Jim Elliott; Joe Kearns	Fighting with My Family: The Original Soundtrack	2019	
"Don't Leave"	Seven Lions featuring Ellie Goulding	Jeffrey A. Montalvo; Ellie Goulding	Worlds Apart	2014	
"Don't Need Nobody"	Ellie Goulding	Ellie Goulding; Savan Kotecha; Peter Svensson; Ludvig Söderberg; Jakob Jerlström; Max Martin	Delirium	2015	
"Don't Panic"	Ellie Goulding	Ellie Goulding; Greg Kurstin; Maureen "Mozella" McDonald	Delirium	2015	
"Don't Say a Word"	Ellie Goulding	Ellie Goulding; Jim Eliot	Halcyon	2012	
"Don't Want Your Love"	Illenium and Ellie Goulding	Ellie Goulding; Nicholas Miller; Charlotte Aitchison; Alberto Melendez; Peter Rycroft	Odyssey	2026	
"Easy Lover" †	Ellie Goulding featuring Big Sean	Ellie Goulding; Sean Anderson; Greg Kurstin; Julia Michaels	Higher Than Heaven	2022	
"The Ending"	Ellie Goulding	Ellie Goulding; Mathieu Jomphe	Halcyon	2012	
"Every Time You Go"	Ellie Goulding	Ellie Goulding; John Fortis; Starsmith	Lights	2010	
"Explosions" †	Ellie Goulding	Ellie Goulding; John Fortis	Halcyon	2012	
"Fall into the Sky" #	Zedd and Lucky Date featuring Ellie Goulding	Anton Zaslavski; Ellie Goulding; Loria Atkins	Clarity	2012	
"Fields of Love"	Ellie Goulding	Ellie Goulding; Jack Rochon; Dave Hamelin; Feist	We Know Too Much	2026	
"Fighter Plane"	Ellie Goulding	Ellie Goulding; Starsmith	"Under the Sheets"	2009	
"Figure 8" †	Ellie Goulding	Ellie Goulding; Jonny Lattimer	Halcyon	2012	
"First Time" †	Kygo and Ellie Goulding	Ellie Goulding; Sara Hjellström; Fanny Hultman; Jenson Vaugn; Kyrre Gørvell-Dahll; Henrik Meinke; Jonas Kalsch; Alexsej Vlasenko; Jeremy Chacon	Stargazing	2017	
"Flashlight" †	Ellie Goulding and DJ Fresh	Ellie Goulding; Daniel Stein; The Invisible Men	Halcyon Days	2013	
"Flux" †	Ellie Goulding	Ellie Goulding; Jim Eliot; Joe Kearns	Brightest Blue	2019	
"For Your Entertainment" †	Ellie Goulding	Ellie Goulding; Steph Jones; Kiddo A.I. Connor McDonough; Riley McDonough; Jack Rochon; Jake Torrey	I Know Too Much	2026	
"Free" †	Calvin Harris and Ellie Goulding	Adam Wiles; Theo Hutchcraft; Chenai Zinyuku	96 Months	2024	
"Goodness Gracious" †	Ellie Goulding	Ellie Goulding; Greg Kurstin; Nate Ruess	Halcyon Days	2013	
"The Greatest"	Ellie Goulding	Ellie Goulding; Joel Little	Delirium	2015	
"Guns and Horses" †	Ellie Goulding	Ellie Goulding; John Fortis	Lights	2010	
"Halcyon"	Ellie Goulding	Ellie Goulding; Jim Eliot	Halcyon	2012	
"Hanging On"	Ellie Goulding	Patrick James Grossi; Ariel Rechtshaid	Halcyon	2012	
"Hanging On" #	Ellie Goulding featuring Tinie Tempah	Patrick James Grossi; Ariel Rechtshaid; Patrick Okogwu	Halcyon	2012	
"Hate Me" †	Ellie Goulding and Juice Wrld	Ellie Goulding; Jarad Higgins; Jason Evigan; Jordan Johnson; Marcus Lomax; Stefan Johnson; Andrew Wotman; Brittany Hazzard	Brightest Blue	2019	
"Heal"	Ellie Goulding	Ellie Goulding; Guy Lawrence; James Napier	Delirium	2015	
"Hearts Without Chains"	Ellie Goulding	Ellie Goulding; Fraser T. Smith	Halcyon Days	2013	
"Heavy Crown"	Iggy Azalea featuring Ellie Goulding	Iggy Azalea; Ellie Goulding; The Invisible Men; Salt Wives; Jon Turner	Reclassified	2014	
"Here's to Us"	Ellie Goulding	Ellie Goulding; Greg Kurstin; Joe Kearns	Girls Vol. 3: Music from the HBO Original Series	2016	
"High for This"	Ellie Goulding	Abel Tesfaye; Henry Walter; Adrien Gough	Halcyon	2012	
"Higher Than Heaven"	Ellie Goulding	Ellie Goulding; Trey Campbell; Glen Garth; Phil Garth; Stephen Kozmeniuk	Higher Than Heaven	2023	
"Holding on for Life"	Ellie Goulding	Ellie Goulding; Greg Kurstin; Maureen "Mozella" McDonald	Delirium	2015	
"Hollow Crown"	Ellie Goulding	Ellie Goulding; Joe Kearns; Ramin Djawadi; Sam Harris; Eric Frederic; Zach Cooper; Victor Dimotsis	For the Throne: Music Inspired by the HBO Series Game of Thrones	2019	
"Home"	Ellie Goulding	Ellie Goulding; Fred Falke	Bright Lights	2010	
"How Deep Is Too Deep"	Ellie Goulding	Ellie Goulding; Joe Kearns; Starsmith	Brightest Blue	2020	
"How Long"	Ellie Goulding	Ali Temposi; Andrew Watt; Brian Lee; Nathan Perez	Higher Than Heaven	2023	
"How Long Will I Love You" †	Ellie Goulding	Mike Scott	Halcyon Days	2013	
"Human"	Ellie Goulding	Ellie Goulding; Starsmith	Bright Lights	2010	
"Hush" †	Muse with Ellie Goulding	Matt Bellamy; Dominic Howard; Chris Wolstenholme; Dan Lancaster; Theo Hutchcraft; Richard Boardman; Nicholas James Gale	The Wow! Signal	2026	
"Hypnotized" †	Anyma with Ellie Goulding	Ellie Goulding; Anyma; Scott Harris; Jack Rochon; Cassian Stewart-Kasimba	The End of Genesys	2025	
"I Adore You" †	Hugel with Ellie Goulding and J Balvin featuring Topic, Arash and Daecolm	Alexander Tidebrink; Florent Hugel; Tobias Topic; Maximilian Riehl; Loris Cimino; Daecolm Holland; Arash Labaf; José Álvaro Osorio Balvín	Non-album single	2024	
"I Do What I Love"	Ellie Goulding	Ellie Goulding; Laleh Pourkarim	Delirium	2015	
"I Know Too Much"	Ellie Goulding	Ellie Goulding; Jack Rochon; Aaron Paris	I Know Too Much	2026	
"I Know You Care"	Ellie Goulding	Ellie Goulding; Justin Parker	Halcyon	2012	
"I Need Your Love" †	Calvin Harris featuring Ellie Goulding	Calvin Harris; Ellie Goulding	18 Months; Halcyon	2012	
"I'll Hold My Breath"	Ellie Goulding	Ellie Goulding; Starsmith	Lights	2010	
"I'll Smile"	Ellie Goulding	Chris Read	Crush Hour (Original Cast Recording)	2022	
"In My City"	Ellie Goulding	Ellie Goulding; Mathieu Jomphe	Halcyon	2012	
"In My Dreams" †	Four Tet with Ellie Goulding	Ellie Goulding; Kieran Hebden	Non-album single	2024	
"In This Together"	Ellie Goulding featuring Steven Price	Ellie Goulding; Jim Eliot; Joe Kearns; Steven Price	Our Planet: Music from the Netflix Original Series	2019	
"Intro (Delirium)"	Ellie Goulding	Ellie Goulding; Joe Kearns; Chris Ketley	Delirium	2015	
"Intuition"	Ellie Goulding	Ellie Goulding; Greg Kurstin	Higher Than Heaven	2023	
"Jealousy"	Ellie Goulding	Ellie Goulding; Jack Rochon; Scott Harris; Madison Love; Connor McDonough; Riley McDonough	I Know Too Much	2026	
"Jolene"	Ellie Goulding	Dolly Parton	Dermot O'Leary Presents The Saturday Sessions	2010	
"Journey In"	Ellie Goulding	Chris Read	Crush Hour (Original Cast Recording)	2022	
"Joy"	Ellie Goulding	Ellie Goulding; Jim Eliot	Halcyon	2012	
"Just for You"	Ellie Goulding	Ellie Goulding; Greg Kurstin; Julia Michaels	Higher Than Heaven	2023	
"Keep on Dancin'"	Ellie Goulding	Ellie Goulding; Ryan Tedder; Nicole Morier; Noel Zancanella	Delirium	2015	
"King's Cross Station"	Ellie Goulding	Chris Read	Crush Hour (Original Cast Recording)	2022	
"Let It Die" (Note: "Let It Die" is the second song by Goulding with the same title, the first being a bonus track from Goulding's third studio album Delirium.) †	Ellie Goulding	Ellie Goulding; Peter Rycroft; Andrea Rocha; Tom Mann	Higher Than Heaven	2022	
"Let It Die" (Target Exclusive)	Ellie Goulding	Ellie Goulding	Delirium	2015	
"Leave Me Slowly" †	Starsmith featuring Ellie Goulding	Ellie Goulding; Starsmith; Sarah Troy	Non-album single	2024	
"Like a Saviour"	Ellie Goulding	Ellie Goulding; Andrew Wells; Anthony Rossomando; Tom Mann	Higher Than Heaven	2023	
"Lights" †	Ellie Goulding	Ellie Goulding; Richard Stannard; Ash Howes	Lights; Bright Lights	2010	
"Little Dreams"	Ellie Goulding	Ellie Goulding; Liam Howe	Bright Lights	2010	
"Loser"	Ellie Goulding	Ellie Goulding; Steph Jones; Kiddo A.I. Connor McDonough; Riley McDonough; Jack Rochon; Jake Torrey	I Know Too Much	2026	
"Lost and Found" #	Ellie Goulding	Ellie Goulding; Carl Falk; Max Martin; Laleh Pourkarim; Joakim Berg	Delirium	2015	
"Love Goes On"	Ellie Goulding	Ellie Goulding; Greg Kurstin	Higher Than Heaven	2023	
"Love I'm Given" †	Ellie Goulding	Ellie Goulding; Joe Kearns; Jim Eliot	Brightest Blue	2020	
"Love Me like You Do" †	Ellie Goulding	Max Martin; Savan Kotecha; Ilya Salmanzadeh; Ali Payami; Tove Nilsson	Fifty Shades of Grey: Original Motion Picture Soundtrack; Delirium	2015	
"Mama"	Clean Bandit featuring Ellie Goulding	Elena Goulding; Jack Patterson; Grace Chatto; Jason Evigan; Caroline Ailin	What Is Love?	2018	
"Midas Touch"	Ellie Goulding and Burns	Boaz Watson; June Watson	Halcyon Days	2013	
"Midnight Dreams"	Ellie Goulding	Ellie Goulding; Trey Campbell; Glen Garth; Phil Garth; Stephen Kozmeniuk	Higher Than Heaven	2023	
"Miracle" †	Calvin Harris and Ellie Goulding	Adam Wiles; Ellie Goulding	96 Months	2023	
"Mirror"	Ellie Goulding	Ellie Goulding; Mathieu Jomphe	The Hunger Games: Catching Fire – Original Motion Picture Soundtrack	2013	
"Mirrors"	Ellie Goulding	Justin Timberlake; Timothy Mosley; Jerome "J-Roc" Harmon; James Fauntleroy	BBC Radio 1's Live Lounge 2013	2013	
"Misremember You"	Ellie Goulding	Ellie Goulding; Jack Rochon; Ines Dunn; Mags Duval; Matt Zara	I Know Too Much	2026	
"My Blood"	Ellie Goulding	Ellie Goulding; Jim Eliot; Mima Stilwell	Halcyon	2012	
"My Life/Happiness (skit)"	Big Sean featuring Ellie Goulding	Ellie Goulding; Eryn Allen Koehn; Louis Kevin Celestin; Robert "Bubby" Lewis; Rogét Chahayed; Sean Anderson; Stephen Feigenbaum	Better Me Than You	2024	
"New Heights"	Ellie Goulding	Ellie Goulding; Patrick Wimberly; Joe Kearns; Maxwell Cooke	Brightest Blue	2020	
"New Love" †	Silk City featuring Ellie Goulding	Ellie Goulding; Clément Picard; Mark Ronson; Maxime Picard; Steve McCutcheon; Thomas Wesley Pentz	Non-album single	2021	
"Nice Things"	Ellie Goulding	Ellie Goulding; Jack Rochon	We Know Too Much	2026	
"Nobody Dances"	Ellie Goulding	Ellie Goulding; Mags Duval; Adam Yaron	I Know Too Much	2026	
"Ode to Myself"	Ellie Goulding	Ellie Goulding; Joe Kearns	Brightest Blue	2020	
"O Holy Night" (Note: "O Holy Night" was originally released as a free download in 2015, but it was not officially released as a single until 2017.) †	Ellie Goulding	Adolphe Adam; Placide Cappeau	Non-album single	2017	
"Only Girl (in the World)"	Ellie Goulding	Crystal Johnson; Mikkel S. Eriksen; Tor Erik Hermansen; Sandy Wilhelm	Radio 1's Live Lounge – Volume 6	2011	
"Only You"	Ellie Goulding	Ellie Goulding; Jim Eliot	Halcyon	2012	
"On My Mind" †	Ellie Goulding	Ellie Goulding; Max Martin; Savan Kotecha; Ilya	Delirium	2015	
"Outside" †	Calvin Harris featuring Ellie Goulding	Calvin Harris; Ellie Goulding	Motion; Delirium	2014	
"Overture"	Ellie Goulding	James Wyatt	Brightest Blue	2020	
"Paradise"	Ellie Goulding	Ellie Goulding; Joel Little	Delirium	2015	
"Power" †	Ellie Goulding	Ellie Goulding; Jamie Scott; Jonny Coffer; David Paich; Lucy Taylor; Digital Farm Animals; Jack Tarrant	Brightest Blue	2020	
"Powerful" †	Major Lazer featuring Ellie Goulding and Tarrus Riley	Thomas Pentz; Maxime Picard; Clement Picard; Omar Riley; Ilsey Juber; Fran Hall	Peace Is the Mission; Delirium	2015	
"Ravers" †	Ellie Goulding	Ellie Goulding; Dave Hamelin; Jack Rochon; Sarah Solovay; Sophie Cates	I Know Too Much	2026	
"Right Hand"	Ellie Goulding	Ellie Goulding; Jack Rochon; Noah Conrad; Jack Bowman	We Know Too Much	2026	
"Ritual"	Ellie Goulding	Ellie Goulding; Richard Stannard; Ash Howes	Halcyon	2012	
"River" †	Ellie Goulding	Joni Mitchell	Non-album single	2019	
"Roscoe"	Ellie Goulding	Tim Smith; Paul Alexander; Eric Nichelson; Eric Pulido; John Smith	An Introduction to Ellie Goulding	2009	
"Sacrifice"	Junkie XL featuring Ellie Goulding	Junkie XL	Divergent: Original Motion Picture Score	2014	
"Salt Skin"	Ellie Goulding	Ellie Goulding; Starsmith	Lights	2010	
"Save My Love"†	Marshmello with Ellie Goulding and AVAION	Ellie Goulding; Marshmello; Connor McDonough; Riley McDonough; Gray Hawken; Jake Torrey	Non-album single	2025	
"Scream It Out"	Ellie Goulding	Ellie Goulding; Jim Eliot	Delirium	2015	
"Shark Eyes"	Ellie Goulding	Sorcha Richardson; Alex Casnoff	Non-album single	2023	
"Silhouette"	Active Child featuring Ellie Goulding	Patrick James Grossi	Rapor	2013	
"Sixteen" †	Ellie Goulding	Ellie Goulding; Joe Kearns; Rachel Keen; Fred Gibson	Brightest Blue	2019	
"Slow Grenade" †	Ellie Goulding featuring Lauv	Ellie Goulding; Joe Kearns; Lauv; Leland; Oscar Görres	Brightest Blue	2020	
"Soho Square"	Ellie Goulding	Kirsty MacColl; Mark E. Nevin	A Concert for Kirsty MacColl	2013	
"Somebody" †	TSHA, Ellie Goulding and Gregory Porter	Ellie Goulding; Teisha Matthews; Matthew Phelan	Non-album single	2023	
"Something in the Way You Move" †	Ellie Goulding	Ellie Goulding; Greg Kurstin	Delirium	2015	
"Starry Eyed" †	Ellie Goulding	Ellie Goulding; Jonny Lattimer	Lights	2010	
"Start"	Ellie Goulding featuring serpentwithfeet	Ellie Goulding; Joe Kearns; Maxwell Cooke serpentwithfeet	Brightest Blue	2020	
"Stay Awake"	Ellie Goulding	Ellie Goulding; Makeba Riddick; Hugo Pierre Leclercq	Halcyon; Halcyon Days	2012	
"Still Falling for You" †	Ellie Goulding	Ellie Goulding; Tove Lo; Rickard Göransson; Shellback; Ilya	Bridget Jones's Baby: Original Motion Picture Soundtrack	2016	
"Summit"	Skrillex featuring Ellie Goulding	Skrillex	Bangarang	2011	
"Sweet Delusion"	Ellie Goulding	Ellie Goulding; Jack Rochon	We Know Too Much	2026	
"Take Me to Church"	Ellie Goulding	Andrew Hozier-Byrne	Non-album single	2015	
"Tastes Like You"	Ellie Goulding	Ellie Goulding; Andrew Wells; Anthony Rossomando; Tom Mann	Higher Than Heaven	2023	
"Temptation"	Ellie Goulding	Ellie Goulding; Andrew Wells; Anthony Rossomando; Tom Mann	Higher Than Heaven	2023	
"Tessellate"	Ellie Goulding	Joe Newman; Gus Unger-Hamilton; Gwilym Sainsbury; Thom Green; Charlie Andrew	Halcyon Days	2013	
"This Love (Will Be Your Downfall)"	Ellie Goulding	Ellie Goulding; Starsmith	Lights	2010	
"Tides"	Ellie Goulding	Ellie Goulding; Joe Kearns; Starsmith	Brightest Blue	2020	
"Times Like These"	Live Lounge Allstars	Dave Grohl; Taylor Hawkins; Nate Mendel; Chris Shiflett	Non-album single	2020	
"Tris"	Junkie XL featuring Ellie Goulding	Junkie XL	Divergent: Original Motion Picture Score	2014	
"Two Years Ago"	Ellie Goulding	Ellie Goulding; Jim Eliot	Delirium	2015	
"Under Control"	Ellie Goulding	Ellie Goulding; Oliver Goldstein; Bonnie McKee; Cory Nitta	Halcyon Days	2013	
"Under the Sheets" †	Ellie Goulding	Ellie Goulding; Starsmith	An Introduction to Ellie Goulding; Lights	2009	
"Vincent" †	Ellie Goulding	Don McLean	Non-album single	2018	
"Waiting for It"	Ellie Goulding	Ellie Goulding; Jesse Shatkin; Maureen "Mozilla" McDonald	Higher Than Heaven	2023	
"Ways to Hurt"	Ellie Goulding	Ellie Goulding; Jack Rochon; Mike Dean	We Know Too Much	2026	
"We Can't Move to This"	Ellie Goulding	Ellie Goulding; Fred Gibson; Alex Gibson; Greg Kurstin; Maureen "Mozella" McDonald	Delirium	2015	
"When Your Feet Don't Touch the Ground"	Ellie Goulding	Gary Barlow; Eliot Kennedy	Finding Neverland: The Album	2015	
"Wine Drunk"	Ellie Goulding	Ellie Goulding; Joe Kearns	Brightest Blue	2020	
"Winner"	Ellie Goulding	Ellie Goulding; Laleh Pourkarim	Delirium	2015	
"Wish I Stayed" #	Ellie Goulding	Ellie Goulding	Lights	2010	
"Without Your Love"	Ellie Goulding	Ellie Goulding; Fin Dow-Smith	Halcyon	2012	
"Woman"	Ellie Goulding	Ellie Goulding; Eli Teplin; Tobias Jesso Jr. Christopher Stacey	Brightest Blue	2020	
"Wonderman" †	Tinie Tempah featuring Ellie Goulding	Patrick Okogwu; Timothy McKenzie; Marc Williams	Disc-Overy	2010	
"Worry About Me" †	Ellie Goulding featuring Blackbear	Ellie Goulding; Ilya Salmanzadeh; Matthew Musto; Peter Svensson; Savan Kotecha	Brightest Blue	2020	
"The Writer" †	Ellie Goulding	Ellie Goulding; Jonny Lattimer	Lights	2010	
"You Don't Know"	Flinch featuring Ellie Goulding	Flinch; Ellie Goulding	Non-album single	2013	
"You Don't Know"	Big Sean	Flinch; Ellie Goulding; Big Sean; No I.D.	Hall of Fame	2013	
"You, My Everything" #	Ellie Goulding	Ellie Goulding; Eg White	Halcyon Days	2013	
"Your Biggest Mistake"	Ellie Goulding	Ellie Goulding; Fraser T. Smith	Lights	2010	
"Your Song" †	Ellie Goulding	Elton John; Bernie Taupin	Bright Lights	2010	
