= Halcyon Days (Ellie Goulding album) =

2013 studio album reissue by Ellie Goulding

- Standard cover

Studio album (reissue) by Ellie Goulding
- Released: 23 August 2013
- Recorded: 2011–2013
- Studios: Studio Splendido (Wales); The Ballroom (London); Red Rhino (Canada); Starsmith HQ (UK); Air (UK); Strongroom (London); EMI (London); Fly Eye (London); Studio at the Palms (Las Vegas); British Grove (London); Biffco (Brighton); Troublemakers (Montréal); MyAudiotonic (The Matrix) (London); Sarm (London)
- Genre: Indie pop
- Length: 79:22
- Label: Polydor
- Producers: Billboard; Burns; Cory Enemy; Jim Eliot; John Fortis; DJ Fresh; Ellie Goulding; Calvin Harris; Greg Kurstin; Robbie Lamond; Madeon; Monsta; Oligee; Justin Parker; Fraser T Smith; Mike Spencer; Starsmith; Xaphoon Jones

Ellie Goulding chronology
Halcyon (2012)	Halcyon Days (2013)	Halcyon Days: The Remixes (2014)

Singles from Halcyon Days
- 1. "Burn" Released: 5 July 2013; 2. "How Long Will I Love You" Released: 10 November 2013; 3. "Goodness Gracious" Released: 21 February 2014

Halcyon Days is the reissue of English singer Ellie Goulding's second studio album, Halcyon (2012). It was released on 23 August 2013 by Polydor Records. Following the release of Halcyon, Goulding announced that she had plans to repackage the original album, with new songs that focused on electronic music. For the reissue, Goulding recorded 10 new songs and worked with a variety of producers, including Ryan Tedder, Calvin Harris and Greg Kurstin, to create her desired sound.

Upon release, Halcyon Days met generally positive receptions from music critics, who praised the album's musical expansion, its production and happier lyrical content. Commercially, the reissue charted top on New Zealand, and it helped to propel the original album on numerous charts. The lead single from the reissue, "Burn", was released on 5 July 2013, becoming Goulding's first number-one single on the UK Singles Chart. "How Long Will I Love You" and "Goodness Gracious" were subsequently released as the second and third singles from Halcyon Days, respectively. A second reissue, titled Halcyon Nights, in honour of the original album's tenth anniversary, was released on 12 October 2022.

== Background ==
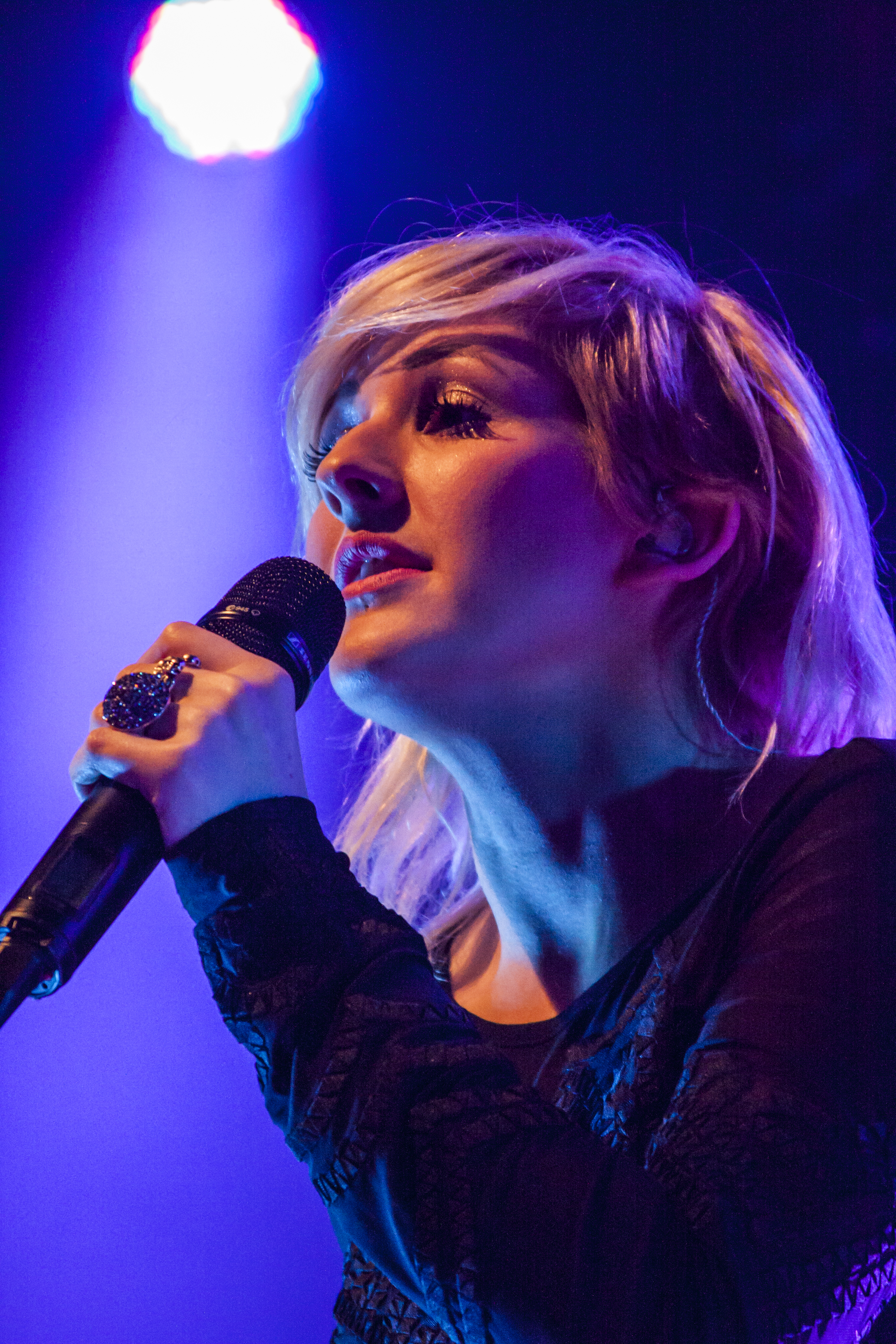
Goulding in 2012, performing at the Manchester Academy

In late July 2012, it was announced that Goulding's second studio album would be titled Halcyon, set to be released in October. The album was preceded by the lead single "Anything Could Happen" on 21 August. The album received general acclaims from music critics, debuting at number two and topping on the UK Albums Chart; it sold 33,425 copies in its first week. Halcyon was further promoted with the release of two singles—"Figure 8" and "Explosions"—as well as its accompanying tour of the reissue's same name.

In an interview with Elle in July 2013, Goulding announced plans to release a repackaged version of Halcyon with new songs, commenting: "I have such an affinity with electronic music that I can't step away from it."

== Composition ==
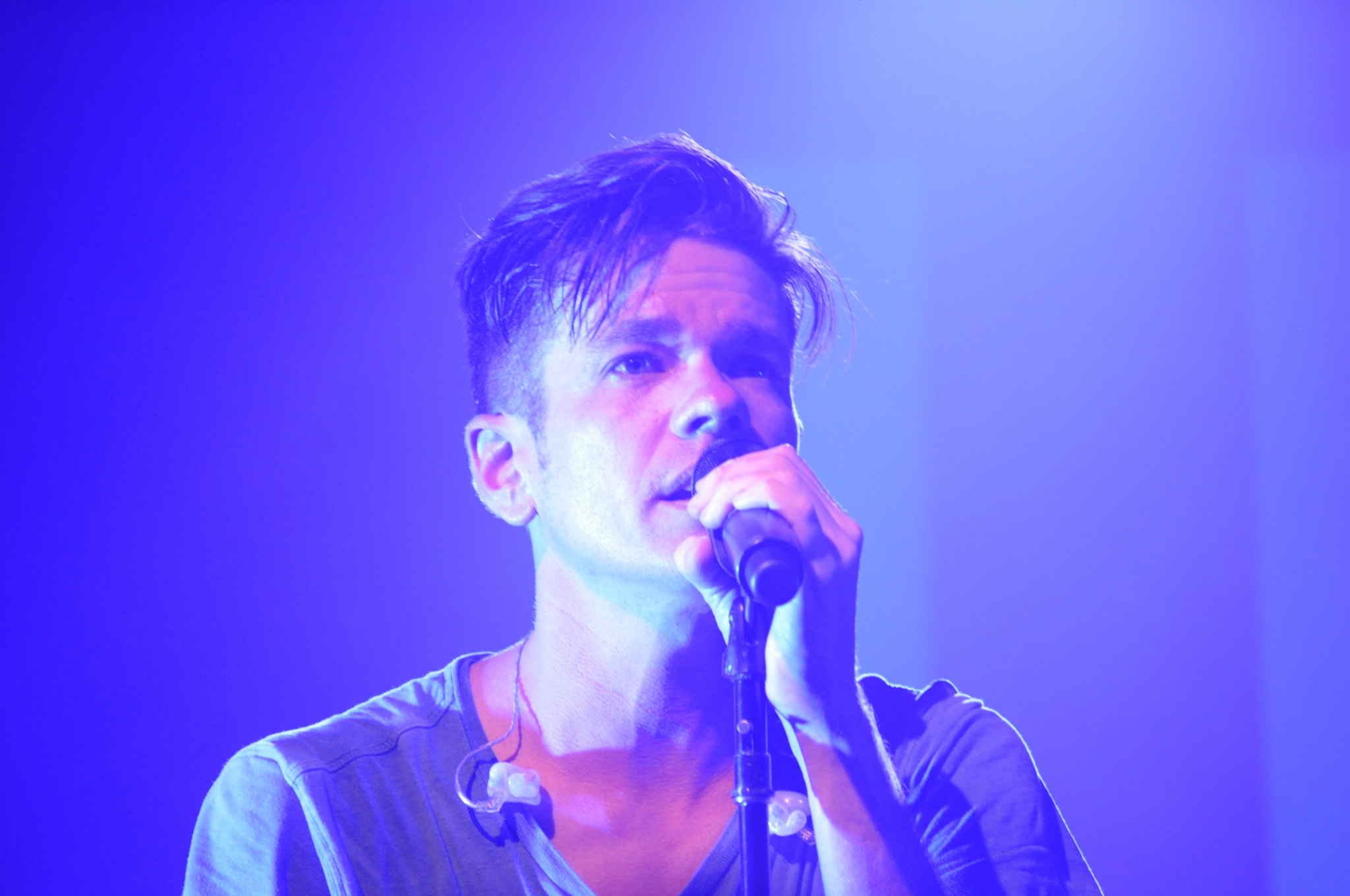
Fun's Nate Ruess (pictured) co-wrote Halcyon Day's third single, "Goodness Gracious"

An indie pop album, Halcyon Days features 10 new tracks, with the first track "Burn"; Idolator's Kathy Iandoli "a celebration of life in its purest form". It is a pop song with rave influences, while her vocals are crowded with echoes and distortion. According to Goulding, the track is "probably the most poppy song" she had released. "Goodness Gracious" follows, described by Nicole Frehsee of Rolling Stone as "a blippy ode to fickleness." It was co-written with Fun's Nate Ruess, with Goulding noting that the song "is about dissing yourself for not thinking straight and not being fair". "You My Everything" and "Flashlight" (with DJ Fresh) "take Goulding's natural inclination for electronic beats and mix them with the soulful undertone of her vocals", according to Iandoli. "Stay Awake" celebrates "not sleeping and partying all night" over triumphant synth stabs, as highlighted by Frehsee. Goulding stated: "It's less serious content than I'd usually write about", but she's "always been a fan of club songs that feel good."

Fourth track, "Hearts Without Chains", was described as "an affecting piano-based ballad about healing and moving forward". It was co-written by Fraser T. Smith, and Goulding said it is her "favorite song of the batch". According to her, the song features "a folky English quality to it" and it is "quite nice to listen to and not be in the state I was when I wrote it". "Under Control" "reclaims empowerment and confidence ('I feel like I'm breathing again'), while wrapped in a mix of fuzzy bass and echoed clanks", as declared by Lewis Corner of Digital Spy. The other three tracks are cover songs; "How Long Will I Love You?" was originally released by the Waterboys, and Goulding transforms it into a sweet, contemplative ballad. It was part of the soundtrack for Richard Curtis's romantic comedy film About Time (2013). The second is Alt-J's "Tessellate"; it loses some of its cryptic airs as Goulding reveals different layers, featuring a "seductive makeover with Chiddy Bang's Xaphoon Jones on the beat". Midnight Star's "Midas Touch" is turned inside out into a fittingly atmospheric declaration of self, having a darker tone.

== Release and promotion ==
The reissue, titled Halcyon Days, was released on 26 August 2013 and contains ten additional tracks, including the lead single "Burn". The song "You My Everything", which was ultimately included on Halcyon Days, premiered on 1 July 2013, during the first episode of the final series of the British teen drama series Skins. "Under Control" was offered as a free download on Amazon UK on 21 August 2013. "Burn" was featured in the second episode of the fifth season of The Vampire Diaries on 10 October 2013, and "Tessellate" was used in the seventh episode of the third season of Revenge on 10 November.

Goulding performed "Burn" on the British and Italian editions of The X Factor on 13 and 31 October 2013, respectively. She also promoted the single on The Ellen DeGeneres Show on 24 October 2013, on The Queen Latifah Show on 28 October, on NBC's The Voice on 26 November, on Late Show with David Letterman on 21 January 2014 and on Good Morning America on 22 January. Goulding delivered the first televised performance of "Goodness Gracious" on the British chat show The Graham Norton Show on 28 February 2014.

Upon release, Halcyon Days charted top in New Zealand, while reaching top 30 in Australia, Austria, Croatia, Finland and Sweden.

=== Singles ===
"Burn" was released on 5 July 2013, as the first single from Halcyon Days. A fan-submitted Vine video for the song premiered on 4 July 2013, followed by the official music video on 7 July. The track became Goulding's first-ever number one on the UK Singles Chart, topping the chart for three consecutive weeks. "Burn" also attained commercial success internationally, reaching number one in Italy, the top five in Austria, Belgium, Finland, Germany, Ireland and Sweden, and the top 10 in Australia, France, New Zealand and Spain. The song was nominated for British Single of the Year and Best Video at the 2014 BRIT Awards.

The second single from Halcyon Days, "How Long Will I Love You", was released on 10 November 2013, for BBC's Children in Need 2013 appeal. The single peaked at number three on the UK Singles Chart. "Goodness Gracious" was released on 21 February 2014, as the reissue's third single. The song reached number 16 on the UK Singles Chart. In an interview with Capital FM on 9 February 2014, DJ Fresh revealed that he and Goulding had recorded a new version of the song "Flashlight" for single release later that year. The reworked version of the song was released on 28 September 2014 as the fourth single from Fresh's fourth studio album.

== Critical reception ==
Professional ratings
Review scores
Source	Rating
Digital Spy	4/5 stars
Idolator	4/5 stars
The New Zealand Herald	4/5
Rolling Stone	3.5/5 stars

Halcyon Days received general acclaim from music critics. Ken Capobianco of Boston Globe noted that "the expanded edition of Ellie Goulding's fine Halcyon is no mere recycling job, as it helps expand the range of her musical vision with 10 new tracks", claiming that "beneath the electronics lies real soul". Caren Ganz of Rolling Stone praised the album for "confirm[ing] [that] Goulding is doing her best work on clubby tracks with luminescent titles". Lewis Corner of Digital Spy opined that the album is "the moment Ellie firmly makes her mark in pop", since its original version "lacked enough upbeat ditties that the wider public seemingly crave". Kathy Iandoli of Idolator agreed, claiming that the album is "a progression into happier territory", and that it's "merely an extension of Ellie's awesomeness and a sonic timeline through happiness, heartbreak and more happiness."

== Track listing ==
Halcyon Days – UK and Australian standard edition
No.	Title	Writer(s)	Producer(s)	Length
1.	"Don't Say a Word"	Ellie Goulding; Jim Eliot	Eliot; Goulding	4:07
2.	"My Blood"	Goulding; Eliot; Mima Stilwell	Eliot; Goulding	3:54
3.	"Anything Could Happen"	Goulding; Eliot	Eliot; Goulding	4:54
4.	"Only You"	Goulding; Eliot	Eliot; Goulding	3:51
5.	"Halcyon"	Goulding; Eliot	Eliot; Goulding	3:25
6.	"Figure 8"	Goulding; Jonny Lattimer	Monsta; Mike Spencer^{[a]}; Lattimer^{[c]}	4:08
7.	"Joy"	Goulding; Eliot	Eliot; Goulding	3:14
8.	"Hanging On"	Patrick James Grossi; Ariel Rechtshaid	Billboard	3:22
9.	"Explosions"	Goulding; Fortis	Fortis	4:03
10.	"I Know You Care"	Justin Parker; Goulding	Parker	3:26
11.	"Atlantis"	Goulding; Eliot	Eliot; Goulding	3:53
12.	"Dead in the Water"	Goulding; Fin Dow-Smith	Starsmith	4:44
13.	"I Need Your Love" (Calvin Harris featuring Ellie Goulding) (bonus track)	Calvin Harris; Goulding	Harris	3:58
14.	"Burn"	Ryan Tedder; Goulding; Greg Kurstin; Noel Zancanella; Brent Kutzle	Kurstin; Tedder^{[c]}	3:51
15.	"Goodness Gracious"	Kurstin; Goulding; Nate Ruess	Joe Kearns^{[c]}; Kurstin^{[c]}	3:46
16.	"You My Everything"	Goulding; Eg White	Robbie Lamond; White^{[c]}; Sigma^{[a]}	3:29
17.	"Hearts Without Chains"	Goulding; Fraser T Smith	Smith	3:45
18.	"Stay Awake" (with Madeon)	Hugo Leclercq; Goulding	Madeon	3:26
19.	"Under Control"	Goulding; Oliver Goldstein; Bonnie McKee; Cory Nitta	Oligee; Cory Enemy	4:06
20.	"Flashlight" (with DJ Fresh)	Dan Stein; The Invisible Men; Goulding	DJ Fresh	3:33
21.	"How Long Will I Love You" (bonus track)	Mike Scott	Fortis	2:34
Total length:				79:22

Halcyon Days – International standard edition
No.	Title	Writer(s)	Producer(s)	Length
13.	"Lights" (single version)	Goulding; Stannard; Howes	Stannard; Howes	3:30
14.	"I Need Your Love" (Calvin Harris featuring Ellie Goulding) (bonus track)	Harris; Goulding	Harris	3:58
15.	"Burn"	Tedder; Goulding; Kurstin; Zancanella; Kutzle	Kurstin; Tedder^{[c]}	3:51
16.	"Goodness Gracious"	Kurstin; Goulding; Ruess	Kearns^{[c]}; Kurstin^{[c]}	3:46
17.	"You My Everything"	Goulding; White	Lamond; White^{[c]}; Sigma^{[a]}	3:29
18.	"Hearts Without Chains"	Goulding; Smith	Smith	3:45
19.	"Stay Awake" (with Madeon)	Leclercq; Goulding	Leclercq	3:26
20.	"Under Control"	Goulding; Goldstein; McKee; Nitta	Oligee; Cory Enemy	4:06
21.	"Flashlight" (with DJ Fresh)	Stein; The Invisible Men; Goulding	DJ Fresh	3:33
22.	"How Long Will I Love You" (bonus track)	Scott	Fortis	2:59

=== Deluxe edition ===
Halcyon Days – UK and Australian deluxe edition (disc one)
No.	Title	Writer(s)	Producer(s)	Length
1.	"Don't Say a Word"	Goulding; Eliot	Eliot; Goulding	4:07
2.	"My Blood"	Goulding; Eliot; Stilwell	Eliot; Goulding	3:54
3.	"Anything Could Happen"	Goulding; Eliot	Eliot; Goulding	4:47
4.	"Only You"	Goulding; Eliot	Eliot; Goulding	3:51
5.	"Halcyon"	Goulding; Eliot	Eliot; Goulding	3:25
6.	"Figure 8"	Goulding; Lattimer	Monsta; Spencer^{[a]}; Lattimer^{[c]}	4:08
7.	"Joy"	Goulding; Eliot	Eliot; Goulding	3:14
8.	"Hanging On"	Grossi; Rechtshaid	Billboard	3:22
9.	"Explosions"	Goulding; Fortis	Fortis	4:03
10.	"I Know You Care"	Parker; Goulding	Parker	3:26
11.	"Atlantis"	Goulding; Eliot	Eliot; Goulding	3:53
12.	"Dead in the Water"	Goulding; Dow-Smith	Starsmith	4:44
13.	"I Need Your Love" (Calvin Harris featuring Ellie Goulding) (bonus track)	Harris; Goulding	Harris	3:58
14.	"Ritual"	Goulding, Stannard, Howes	Monsta; Stannard^{[c]}; Howes^{[c]}	3:50
15.	"In My City"	Goulding; Jomphe	Billboard	3:20
16.	"Without Your Love"	Goulding; Dow-Smith	Starsmith	4:19
17.	"Hanging On" (featuring Tinie Tempah)	Grossi; Rechtshaid; Okogwu	Billboard	4:15
Total length:				82:52

Halcyon Days – International deluxe edition (disc one)
No.	Title	Writer(s)	Producer(s)	Length
18.	"Lights" (single version)	Goulding; Stannard; Howes	Stannard; Howes	3:30

Halcyon Days – Deluxe edition (disc two)
No.	Title	Writer(s)	Producer(s)	Length
1.	"Burn"	Tedder; Goulding; Kurstin; Zancanella; Kutzle	Kurstin; Tedder^{[c]}	3:51
2.	"Goodness Gracious"	Kurstin; Goulding; Ruess	Kearns^{[c]}; Kurstin^{[c]}	3:46
3.	"You My Everything"	Goulding; White	Lamond; White^{[c]}; Sigma^{[a]}	3:29
4.	"Hearts Without Chains"	Goulding; Smith	Smith	3:45
5.	"Stay Awake" (with Madeon)	Leclercq; Goulding	Leclercq	3:26
6.	"Under Control"	Goulding; Goldstein; McKee; Nitta	Oligee; Cory Enemy	4:06
7.	"Flashlight" (with DJ Fresh)	Stein; The Invisible Men; Goulding	DJ Fresh	3:33
8.	"How Long Will I Love You" (bonus track)	Scott	Fortis	2:34
9.	"Tessellate"	Joe Newman; Gus Unger-Hamilton; Gwilym Sainsbury; Thom Green; Charlie Andrew	Xaphoon Jones; Noah Breakfast	3:56
10.	"Midas Touch" (Ellie Goulding × Burns)	Boaz Watson; June Watson	Burns	3:45

Halcyon Days – iTunes Store deluxe edition (bonus videos)
No.	Title	Director	Length
28.	"Hanging On"	Ben Newbury	4:15
29.	"Anything Could Happen"	Floria Sigismondi	4:17
30.	"Figure 8"	W.I.Z.	4:03
31.	"Explosions"	Yuliya Miroshnikova	4:00
32.	"Burn"	Mike Sharpe	3:58
33.	"Tessellate"	Ben Newbury	4:02

Halcyon Days – North American iTunes Store edition
No.	Title	Writer(s)	Producer(s)	Length
29.	"Anything Could Happen" (Blood Diamonds remix)	Goulding; Eliot	Eliot; Goulding; Blood Diamonds^{[b]}	4:58

=== 2014 reissue ===
Halcyon Days – 2014 digital reissue standard edition
No.	Title	Writer(s)	Producer(s)	Length
1.	"Don't Say a Word"	Goulding; Eliot	Eliot; Goulding	4:07
2.	"My Blood"	Goulding; Eliot; Stilwell	Eliot; Goulding	3:54
3.	"Anything Could Happen"	Goulding; Eliot	Eliot; Goulding	4:47
4.	"Only You"	Goulding; Eliot	Eliot; Goulding	3:51
5.	"Halcyon"	Goulding; Eliot	Eliot; Goulding	3:25
6.	"Figure 8"	Goulding; Lattimer	Monsta; Spencer^{[a]}; Lattimer^{[c]}	4:08
7.	"Joy"	Goulding; Eliot	Eliot; Goulding	3:14
8.	"Hanging On"	Grossi; Rechtshaid	Billboard	3:22
9.	"Explosions"	Goulding; Fortis	Fortis	4:03
10.	"I Know You Care"	Parker; Goulding	Parker	3:26
11.	"Atlantis"	Goulding; Eliot	Eliot; Goulding	3:53
12.	"Dead in the Water"	Goulding; Dow-Smith	Starsmith	4:44
13.	"Beating Heart"	Goulding; Joe Janiak	Kurstin	3:32
14.	"Lights" (single version)	Goulding; Stannard; Howes	Stannard; Howes	3:30
15.	"Burn"	Tedder; Goulding; Kurstin; Zancanella; Kutzle	Kurstin; Tedder^{[c]}	3:51
16.	"Goodness Gracious"	Kurstin; Goulding; Ruess	Kearns^{[c]}; Kurstin^{[c]}	3:46
17.	"You My Everything"	Goulding; White	Lamond; White^{[c]}; Sigma^{[a]}	3:29
18.	"Hearts Without Chains"	Goulding; Smith	Smith	3:45
19.	"Stay Awake" (with Madeon)	Leclercq; Goulding	Leclercq	3:26
20.	"Under Control"	Goulding; Goldstein; McKee; Nitta	Oligee; Cory Enemy	4:06
21.	"How Long Will I Love You" (bonus track)	Scott	Fortis	2:34
22.	"Tessellate"	Newman; Unger-Hamilton; Sainsbury; Green; Andrew	Jones; Breakfast	3:56
Total length:				82:00

Halcyon Days – 2014 physical reissue standard edition
No.	Title	Writer(s)	Producer(s)	Length
5.	"Figure 8"	Goulding; Lattimer	Monsta; Spencer^{[a]}; Lattimer^{[c]}	4:08
6.	"Joy"	Goulding; Eliot	Eliot; Goulding	3:14
7.	"Hanging On"	Grossi; Rechtshaid	Billboard	3:22
8.	"Explosions"	Goulding; Fortis	Fortis	4:03
9.	"I Know You Care"	Parker; Goulding	Parker	3:26
10.	"Dead in the Water"	Goulding; Dow-Smith	Starsmith	4:44
11.	"Lights" (single version)	Goulding; Stannard; Howes	Stannard; Howes	3:30
12.	"Beating Heart"	Goulding; Joe Janiak	Kurstin	3:32
13.	"I Need Your Love" (Calvin Harris featuring Ellie Goulding) (bonus track)	Harris; Goulding	Harris	3:58
14.	"Burn"	Tedder; Goulding; Kurstin; Zancanella; Kutzle	Kurstin; Tedder^{[c]}	3:51
15.	"Goodness Gracious"	Kurstin; Goulding; Ruess	Kearns^{[c]}; Kurstin^{[c]}	3:46
16.	"You My Everything"	Goulding; White	Lamond; White^{[c]}; Sigma^{[a]}	3:29
17.	"Hearts Without Chains"	Goulding; Smith	Smith	3:45
18.	"Stay Awake" (with Madeon)	Leclercq; Goulding	Leclercq	3:26
19.	"Under Control"	Goulding; Goldstein; McKee; Nitta	Oligee; Cory Enemy	4:06
20.	"Flashlight" (with DJ Fresh)	Stein; The Invisible Men; Goulding	DJ Fresh	3:33
21.	"How Long Will I Love You" (bonus track)	Scott	Fortis	2:34

Halcyon Days – 2014 Special Asia tour edition (bonus DVD)
No.	Title	Director	Length
1.	"Burn" (music video)	Mike Sharpe	3:58
2.	"Anything Could Happen" (music video)	Floria Sigismondi	4:17
3.	"Explosions" (music video)	Yuliya Miroshnikova	4:00
4.	"Figure 8" (music video)	W.I.Z.	4:03
5.	"Lights" (music video)	Sophie Muller	3:40
6.	"Goodness Gracious" (behind the scenes)	Kinga Burza	3:21

== Credits and personnel ==
Credits were adapted from the liner notes of the deluxe edition.

=== Locations ===
- Studio Splendido; Wales (recording: track 1–5, 7, 11)
- The Ballroom; London, UK (recording: track 6, 15)
- The Lark's Tongue; Buckinghamshire, UK (mixing: track 6, 15)
- Red Rhino Studios; Canada (recording: track 8)
- Starsmith HQ; UK (recording: track 12, 18)
- Air Studios; UK (recording: track 12)
- Strongroom Studios; London, UK (recording: track 18)
- EMI Studios; London, UK (recording: track 14)
- Fly Eye Studio; London, UK (recording: track 14)
- Echo Studio; Los Angeles, California (production: track 16–17)
- Studio at the Palms; Las Vegas, Nevada (vocals recording: track 16)
- British Grove Studios; London, UK (vocals recording: track 17)
- Biffco Studios; Brighton, UK (recording: track 15)
- Troublemakers Studio; Montréal, Quebec, Canada (recording: track 19)
- MyAudiotonic Studios (The Matrix); London, UK (recording: track 20)
- Sarm Studios; London, UK (strings & choir recording: track 4, 7, 10)
- Whitfield Mastering; London, UK (mastering: all tracks except 22)

=== Musicians ===
- Ellie Goulding – lead vocals; acoustic guitar (track 2, 5); electric guitar (track 11, 18); bass (track 4–5); vocals production (track 1–5, 7, 11)
- Jim Eliot – drums, synthesizers, piano, percussion, drum programming, sound effects (track 1–5, 7, 11)
- Rufio Sandilands – instruments, programming, backing vocals (track 6, 15)
- Rocky Morris – instruments, programming (track 6, 15)
- Mike Spencer – additional production, instruments (track 6)
- Justin Parker – piano, programming, backing vocals (track 10)
- John Fortis – keyboards, programming, bass (track 9, 25)
- Fin Dow-Smith (Starsmith) – piano, synthesizers, strings arrangement, bass, guitars, keyboards (track 12, 18)
- Calvin Harris – all instruments (track 14)
- Greg Kurstin – guitar, keyboards, programming (track 16–17)
- Ryan Tedder – vocal production (track 16)
- Nate Ruess – backing vocals (track 17)
- Fraser T. Smith – keys, bass guitar, programming, drum programming (track 20)
- Hugo Leclercq – programming (track 21)
- Tinie Tempah – rap vocals (track 22)
- Kirsty Mangan – violin (track 9, 12, 25)
- Hannah Dawson – violin (track 12)
- Natalie Holt – viola (track 12)
- Rachael Lander – cello (track 12, 25)
- The London Community Gospel Choir – choir (track 3)

=== Technical ===
- Jim Eliot – production (track 1–5, 7, 11)
- Monsta – production, recording (track 6, 15)
- Mike Spencer – additional production, mixing (track 6)
- Justin Parker – production, mixing (track 10)
- John Fortis – production (track 9, 25)
- Starsmith – production (track 12, 18)
- Richard 'Biff' Stannard – production, mixing (track 13)
- Ash Howes – production (track 13, 15)
- Calvin Harris – production, mixing (track 14)
- Greg Kurstin – production (track 16–17)
- Fraser T. Smith – production, mixing (track 20)
- Oligee & Cory Enemy – production (track 23)
- DJ Fresh – production, mixing, mastering (track 24)
- Burns – production, mixing (track 27)
- Tom Elmhirst – mixing (multiple tracks)
- Serban Ghenea – mixing (track 16–17)
- Robert Orton – mixing (track 18)
- Richard Kayvan – mixing (track 25)
- Naweed – mastering (all tracks except 22)
- Hugo Leclercq – mastering (track 22)
- Graham Archer – engineering (choir & strings)
- Ben Baptie – assistant mixing, additional engineering
- Jamie Lillywhite – A&R

=== Art and design ===
- Simon Procter – photography
- Ellie Goulding – art direction
- Cassandra Gracey – art direction
- Hannah Neaves – art direction
- Richard Andrews – design

== Charts ==
=== Weekly charts ===
Chart (2013–14)	Peak position
Australian Albums (ARIA)	4
Austrian Albums (Ö3 Austria)	23
Croatian International Albums (HDU)	21
Finnish Albums (Suomen virallinen lista)	30
Italian Albums (FIMI)	74
New Zealand Albums (RMNZ)	1
Polish Albums (ZPAV)	35
Swedish Albums (Sverigetopplistan)	22

=== Year-end charts ===
Chart (2013)	Position
New Zealand Albums (Recorded Music NZ)	25
Chart (2014)	Position
New Zealand Albums (Recorded Music NZ)	24
Swedish Albums (Sverigetopplistan)	71

== Certifications ==
Certifications and sales
Region	Certification	Certified units/sales
Denmark (IFPI Danmark)	Gold	10,000^{‡}
Mexico (AMPROFON)	Platinum	60,000^{^}
New Zealand (RMNZ)	4× Platinum	60,000^{‡}
Sweden (GLF)	Gold	20,000^{‡}
United Kingdom (BPI)	Silver	60,000^{‡}
^{^} Shipments figures based on certification alone.^{‡} Sales+streaming figures based on certification alone.

== Halcyon Days: The Remixes ==
Halcyon Days: The Remixes

Remix album by Ellie Goulding
- Released: 27 May 2014
- Length: 143:01
- Label: Polydor

Ellie Goulding chronology
Halcyon Days (2013)	Halcyon Days: The Remixes (2014)	Delirium (2015)

On 27 May 2014, Goulding released her second remix album of Halcyon Days through Polydor Records, titled Halcyon Days: The Remixes.

=== Critical reception ===
Professional ratings
Review scores
Source	Rating
AllMusic	3/5 stars

Timothy Monger of AllMusic noted that the remix collection draws from both Halcyon and Halcyon Days, featuring multiple reinterpretations of Goulding's songs by various producers. While he considered some of the remixes to be excessive, he cited the synth-harp version of "Anything Could Happen" by Blood Diamonds and Honest's chillwave mix of "Goodness Gracious" as highlights.

=== Track listing ===
Halcyon Days: The Remixes track listing
No.	Title	Length
1.	"Anything Could Happen" (Alex Metric remix)	7:06
2.	"Anything Could Happen" (Almighty Radio remix)	3:33
3.	"Anything Could Happen" (Birdy Nam Nam remix)	4:01
4.	"Anything Could Happen" (Blood Diamonds remix)	4:58
5.	"Anything Could Happen" (Butch Clancy remix)	5:46
6.	"Anything Could Happen" (Chris Massive remix)	5:05
7.	"Anything Could Happen" (Flinch remix)	4:24
8.	"Anything Could Happen" (Submerse remix)	5:01
9.	"Anything Could Happen" (White Sea remix)	5:05
10.	"Burn" (Aybsent Mynded remix)	4:42
11.	"Burn" (Citizen's Late Nite Dub)	6:45
12.	"Burn" (Lovelife remix)	4:04
13.	"Burn" (Magic Man remix)	4:10
14.	"Burn" (Mat Zo remix)	6:42
15.	"Burn" (Maths Time Joy remix)	4:09
16.	"Burn" (Tiësto's Club Life remix)	5:17
17.	"Explosions" (Gemini remix)	4:40
18.	"Figure 8" (Breakage's Crenshaw and Adams mix)	4:24
19.	"Figure 8" (French Fries Club mix)	5:20
20.	"Figure 8" (The Alias Club mix)	5:55
21.	"Figure 8" (The Alias Radio mix)	4:03
22.	"Figure 8" (Xilent remix)	4:29
23.	"Goodness Gracious" (The Chainsmokers extended remix)	4:19
24.	"Goodness Gracious" (The Chainsmokers remix)	3:52
25.	"Goodness Gracious" (Honest remix)	4:36
26.	"Goodness Gracious" (Josh Butler remix)	5:58
27.	"Hanging On" (Ahadadream remix)	4:35
28.	"Hanging On" (Draper remix)	5:22
29.	"Hanging On" (Sigma remix)	4:40
Total length:		143:01

== Halcyon Nights ==
Halcyon Nights

Studio album (reissue) by Ellie Goulding
- Released: 5 October 2022
- Recorded: 2011–2014
- Length: 119:24
- Label: Polydor

Ellie Goulding chronology
Brightest Blue: Music for Calm (2021)	Halcyon Nights (2022)	Higher Than Heaven (2023)

To celebrate Halcyon's tenth anniversary, Goulding released a second reissue for the album, titled Halcyon Nights. It features a two-disc release containing a total of 31 tracks. The reissue also includes the original tracklist in first disc, meanwhile Halcyon Days tracks are included in the second disc, as well her soundtracks contributions released during that period of time, such as "Beating Heart" from Divergent, "Mirror" from The Hunger Games: Catching Fire, and "Bittersweet" from The Twilight Saga: Breaking Dawn – Part 2.

Halcyon Nights appeared on the music charts of the United Kingdom, specifically on the Official Record Store Chart, Physical Albums, and the Albums Sales Chart.

=== Track listing ===
Disc one
No.	Title	Writer(s)	Producer(s)	Length
1.	"Don't Say a Word"	Goulding; Eliot	Eliot; Goulding	4:07
2.	"My Blood"	Goulding; Eliot; Mauve; Stilwell	Eliot; Goulding	3:54
3.	"Anything Could Happen"	Goulding; Eliot	Eliot; Goulding	4:47
4.	"Only You"	Goulding; Eliot	Eliot; Goulding	3:51
5.	"Halcyon"	Goulding; Eliot	Eliot; Goulding	3:25
6.	"Figure 8"	Goulding; Lattimer	Monsta; Spencer; Lattimer	4:08
7.	"Joy"	Goulding; Eliot	Eliot; Goulding	3:14
8.	"Hanging On"	Active Child; Grossi; Rechtshaid	Billboard	3:22
9.	"Explosions"	Goulding; John Fortis	Fortis	4:03
10.	"I Know You Care"	Parker; Goulding	Parker	3:26
11.	"Atlantis"	Goulding; Eliot	Eliot; Goulding	3:53
12.	"Dead in the Water"	Goulding; Starsmith; Dow-Smith	Starsmith	4:44
13.	"I Need Your Love" (Calvin Harris featuring Ellie Goulding)	Harris; Goulding	Harris	3:58
Total length:				50:52

Disc two
No.	Title	Length
1.	"Burn"	3:51
2.	"Goodness Gracious"	3:46
3.	"You My Everything"	3:29
4.	"Hearts Without Chains"	3:45
5.	"Stay Awake" (with Madeon)	3:26
6.	"Under Control"	4:06
7.	"How Long Will I Love You"	2:34
8.	"Tessellate"	3:56
9.	"Ritual"	3:50
10.	"In My City"	3:19
11.	"Without Your Love"	4:19
12.	"Hanging On" (featuring Tinie Tempah)	4:13
13.	"Midas Touch" (Ellie Goulding × Burns)	3:45
14.	"Flashlight" (with DJ Fresh)	3:33
15.	"The Ending"	4:41
16.	"Beating Heart"	3:32
17.	"Mirror" (from The Hunger Games: Catching Fire)	4:21
18.	"Bittersweet"	3:56
Total length:		68:32

==== Notes ====
- ^{^[a]} signifies an additional producer.
- ^{^[b]} signifies a remixer.
- ^{^[c]} signifies a vocal producer.

=== Charts ===
List of chart performance
Chart (2022)	Peak positions
UK Record Store (OCC)	21
UK Physical Albums (OCC)	79
UK Albums Sales (OCC)	87

== Release history ==
Region	Date	Edition	Label	Ref.
Australia	23 August 2013	Standard; deluxe	Universal	
Germany	23 August 2013	Standard; deluxe	Universal	
Netherlands	23 August 2013	Standard; deluxe	Universal	
Sweden	26 August 2013	Standard; deluxe	Universal	
United Kingdom	26 August 2013	Standard; deluxe	Polydor	
Poland	27 August 2013	Standard; deluxe	Universal	
Canada	27 August 2013	Deluxe	Universal	
United States	27 August 2013	Deluxe	Cherrytree; Interscope	
Italy	1 October 2013	Standard	Universal	
France	9 December 2013	Standard	Universal	
France	10 March 2014	Standard (reissue)	Universal	
Germany	23 May 2014	Standard (reissue)	Universal	
Poland	3 June 2014	Standard (reissue)	Universal	
Japan	2 July 2014	Standard	Universal	
Worldwide	12 October 2022	Halcyon Nights	Polydor	
