= Don't Want Your Love =

- RØZ remix cover

Song by Illenium and Ellie Goulding

from the album Odyssey
- Released: February 6, 2026
- Length: 3:12
- Label: Republic
- Songwriters: Nicholas Miller; Ellie Goulding; Charlotte Aitchison; Alberto Melendez; Peter Rycroft
- Producers: Illenium; Lostboy; Albert Hype

Music video
- "Don't Want Your Love" on YouTube

"Don't Want Your Love" is a song by American DJ and record producer Illenium and English singer-songwriter Ellie Goulding, from the former's sixth studio album, Odyssey (2026). It was released on February 6, 2026, concurrently with the album. The official music video came out on March 2, 2026.

== Background and composition ==
Incorporating bass, alt-electronic, and progressive house sounds, "Don't Want Your Love" was written by Nicholas Miller, Goulding, Charli XCX, Alberto Melendez, and Peter Rycroft. Illenium produced the song, with additional production by Albert Hype, and Lostboy. The track was first announced on January 16, 2026, with the album's track list, where it appeared as the seventh track on Odyssey. Along with the album's release on February 6, "Don't Want Your Love" was released.

In an interview with the fashion magazine Numéro, Illenium stated that the track was originally "a bit slower" and had a "different rhythmic vibe", but it was later reworked once he began collaborating with Goulding.

I've always been a fan of hers [Ellie]. Everything she sings on is incredible. This song and her performance stood out at first listen. Even though the demo was a bit slower and had a different rhythmic vibe, I knew we had to work on it together.

— Illenium on working with Goulding, Numéro

== Promotion ==
The duo performed the song live together for the first time during Illenium's residency at Sphere in Las Vegas, on the residency's closing night. A music video for "Don't Want Your Love", directed by Baby and produced by Freddie Hill, was released on April 2, 2026. The music video depicts Goulding in a bright, white setting, while Illenium appears upside down in a darker place, while the visuals keep a sci-fi style, complementing the album's aesthetic.

== Commercial performance ==
"Don't Want Your Love" debuted at number nine on the US Hot Dance/Electronic Songs chart, becoming Goulding's ninth and Illenium's tenth top-ten entry. On April 18, the song topped the US Dance/Mix Show Airplay, becoming Goulding's ninth and Illenium's eighth number one song, placing them as the fifth, and sixth acts with the most number-one songs on the chart, respectively.

== Track listing ==
- Digital download / streaming – RØZ Remix
1. "Don't Want Your Love" (featuring RØZ and Ellie Goulding) [RØZ Remix] – 2:43
- Digital download / streaming – RØZ Remix (Extended)
1. "Don't Want Your Love" (featuring RØZ and Ellie Goulding) [RØZ Extended Remix] – 3:35
- Digital download / streaming – Grey Remix
1. "Don't Want Your Love" (featuring Ellie Goulding) [Grey Remix] – 2:59

== Personnel ==
Credits were adapted from Tidal.

- Ellie Goulding – vocalist, composer
- Illenium – producer, composer
- Lostboy – producer, composer
- Albert Hype – producer
- Alex Seaver – executive producer
- Alberto Carlos Melendez – composer
- Charlotte Emma Aitchison – composer
- Tom Norris – mixing engineer

== Charts ==
Chart performance
Chart (2026)	Peak position
New Zealand Hot Singles (RMNZ)	30
Nicaragua Anglo Airplay (Monitor Latino)	4
Poland (Polish Airplay Top 100)	25
US Dance/Mix Show Airplay (Billboard)	1
US Hot Dance/Electronic Songs (Billboard)	9

== See also ==
- List of songs recorded by Ellie Goulding
- List of Billboard number-one dance songs of 2026
