= Burn (Ellie Goulding song) =

2013 single by Ellie Goulding

Single by Ellie Goulding

from the album Halcyon Days
- B-side: "Hearts Without Chains"
- Released: 5 July 2013
- Recorded: 2012–2013
- Studio: Studio at the Palms (Las Vegas, Nevada)
- Genre: Electropop; synth-pop
- Length: 3:51
- Label: Polydor
- Songwriters: Ryan Tedder; Ellie Goulding; Greg Kurstin; Noel Zancanella; Brent Kutzle
- Producer: Greg Kurstin

Ellie Goulding singles chronology
"I Need Your Love" (2013)	"Burn" (2013)	"How Long Will I Love You" (2013)

Music video
- "Burn" on YouTube

"Burn" is a song by English singer Ellie Goulding from Halcyon Days (2013), the reissue of her second studio album, Halcyon (2012). The song was written by Ryan Tedder, Goulding, Greg Kurstin, Noel Zancanella and Brent Kutzle, while production was handled by Kurstin and vocal production was done by Tedder. It was released on 5 July 2013 as the lead single from the reissue. The song was originally recorded by British singer Leona Lewis for her third studio album, Glassheart (2012), but it was ultimately scrapped.

Upon its release, "Burn" was met with a mixed to positive response from music critics, who praised it as "catchy" and noted it as one of Goulding's most radio-friendly songs to date, while others felt it was not memorable. It earned Goulding her first number-one single on the UK singles chart, selling 116,857 copies in its first week and staying atop the chart for three consecutive weeks. The track attained similar success internationally, also reaching number one in Italy and the top 10 in countries such as Australia, Austria, Belgium, Germany, Ireland, New Zealand and Sweden, as well as number 13 on the Billboard Hot 100.

The accompanying music video was directed by Mike Sharpe and depicts Goulding in a field singing and dancing with friends. Goulding promoted the single on several television shows, including The X Factor, The Ellen DeGeneres Show, The Voice and Late Show with David Letterman. "Burn" was nominated for British Single of the Year and British Video of the Year at the 2014 Brit Awards. In 2017, an a cappella interpretation was sung by actress Raffey Cassidy in the psychological horror film The Killing of a Sacred Deer.

== Background and writing ==
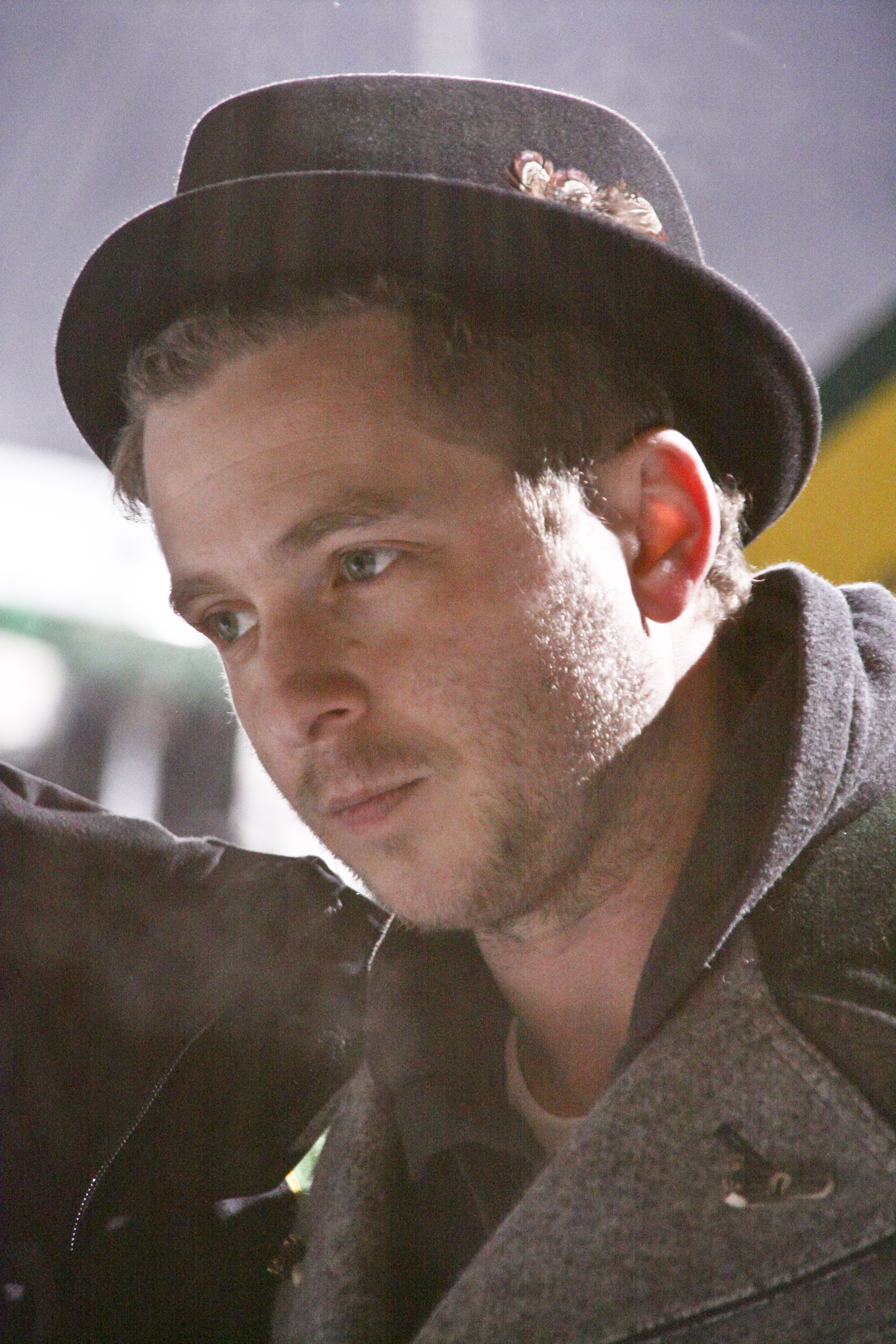
Ryan Tedder co-wrote "Burn"

"Burn" was originally recorded by fellow English singer Leona Lewis for her third studio album, Glassheart (2012), but it was omitted from the final track listing when the album was redesigned to include more ballads. According to Jacques Peterson of Popdust, "While Ellie's 'Burn' is a little more indie-pop sounding, Leona's breaks into derivative tropical synths on the second verse in an obvious attempt to match the Stargate sound that was such a popular radio staple a few years ago."

In an interview with Billboard magazine, one of the song's co-writers, Ryan Tedder, stated, "I wrote ['Burn'] on a tour bus in Chicago, me and Brent [Kutzle] ... Ellie cut the vocal, killed it, she didn't mess around. And then it sat for a year. [Interscope] came back to me and I told my manager, 'I can't even look at it and I will give up publishing to do it.' We had a list of two or three producers—the name [Greg] Kurstin came up. I don't think I let them finish the sentence because I had just spent time with him on the Beyoncé camp. And I said, 'Absolutely Greg Kurstin! I know that he is the guy.' I sent him a list of comments, he gave it a second pass, and it was done." According to the sheet music published at Musicnotes.com, the song is composed in the key of B♭ minor.

== Critical reception ==
"Burn" received mostly positive reviews from music critics. Sam Lansky of Idolator wrote that, compared to Lewis's original version, Goulding's "distinctive" voice makes the song "trippier and more ethereal, but the commercial songcraft makes it radio candy—maybe the most mainstream single she's had since 'Lights.'" Lewis Corner of Digital Spy, giving the track four out of five stars, opined that Goulding "presents what is most likely to go down as one of her more radio-friendly singles to date", adding that her voice "also glides above the dream pop glow to ear-pleasing effect".

Despite praising Goulding's vocals as "angelic and ethereal", Amy Sciarretto of PopCrush rated the song three out of five stars, stating, "While 'Burn' is undeniably catchy, it's not the singer's most memorable track to date." Sciarretto concluded that it "doesn't sound like the pivotal track which will elevate her career even further in the mainstream radio world, but her fans will no doubt love it." Rolling Stone's Joe Gross gave "Burn" two and a half out of five stars and dubbed it "a completely inoffensive slice of hands-in-the-air British pop; you can expect it to show up on So You Think You Can Dance before it burns out."

== Commercial performance ==
"Burn" debuted atop the UK singles chart with first-week sales of 116,857 copies, becoming Goulding's first number-one single on the chart. The single retained the number-one position for two additional weeks, selling 80,095 and 62,270 copies in its second and third weeks, respectively. In its fourth week, the song was knocked off the top spot by Katy Perry's "Roar", falling to number two with 51,924 units sold. "Burn" was the 15th best-selling single of 2013 in United Kingdom, as well as the best-selling single by a British female artist that year. As of April 2023, the single had sold 1.4 million units in the UK. "Burn" debuted and peaked at number two on the Irish Singles Chart, earning Goulding her second highest-peaking single in Ireland after "Love Me like You Do".

In the United States, "Burn" entered the Billboard Hot 100 at number 53, selling 82,000 digital copies in its first week. The song peaked at number 13 on the issue dated 28 December 2013, becoming Goulding's third highest-peaking single on the Hot 100 after "Lights" and, later, "Love Me like You Do". It also became Goulding's second number-one single on Billboard's Dance/Mix Show Airplay chart, following "Lights". As of July 2014, "Burn" had sold two million copies in the US.

"Burn" was commercially successful across continental Europe, where it topped the charts in Hungary, Italy and Slovakia, while reaching the top five in Austria, Belgium, Czech Republic, Finland, Germany, Norway, Poland, Sweden and Switzerland, and the top 10 in France, Netherlands and Spain.

The song debuted on the Australian Singles Chart at number 72, before entering the top 50 at number 14. It peaked at number six in its fifth week on the chart, Goulding's highest-charting solo single in the country. Two weeks later, "Burn" was certified platinum by the Australian Recording Industry Association (ARIA) for sales of 70,000 copies, eventually earning a triple platinum certification for sales of 210,000 units. The track debuted and peaked at number seven on the New Zealand Singles Chart, and was certified double platinum by Recorded Music NZ.

== Music video ==
Filming of the music video for "Burn" took place at RAF Wittering near Peterborough, Cambridgeshire, on 3 June 2013, and included 180 extras. It was directed by Mike Sharpe and premiered on 7 July 2013. The video opens with an orange colour scheme of Goulding singing with friends and lens flares shining upon their movements with some smoke. The video also features a lot of people running and with Goulding wearing a hoodie. Later, Goulding is seen in a gigantic field with hundreds of light spheres and the video ends with flares and more dancing with far more dancers and a red-themed scene. In the end, the lights form Goulding's logo in the field.

== Live performances ==
On 31 October 2013, Goulding performed "Burn" on the second live results show of the seventh series of the Italian version of The X Factor. She also performed the single on The Ellen DeGeneres Show on 24 October 2013 and on The Queen Latifah Show on 28 October.

Goulding performed "Burn" at the BBC Children in Need Rocks 2013 benefit show at the Hammersmith Apollo in London on 13 November 2013. On 26 November, Goulding performed it on the fifth season of The Voice, where she was joined on stage by contestants James Wolpert, Matthew Schuler and Will Champlin. On 20 December, she performed the song during the final show of the third season of The Voice of Germany with finalist Debbie Schippers. Goulding performed the song as part of her setlist at Capital FM's Jingle Bell Ball on 7 December. She also performed the track on the Top of the Pops New Year special, which aired on 31 December 2013 on BBC One.

Goulding performed the song on Late Show with David Letterman on 21 January 2014 and on Good Morning America the following day. Goulding performed a medley of "I Need Your Love", her collaboration with Calvin Harris, and "Burn" at the 2014 Brit Awards on 19 February 2014. That same day, her performance of "Burn" was released to the iTunes Store. On 12 March 2014, she appeared on Today to perform "Burn" and an acoustic version of "Beating Heart". Goulding performed the song, along with "Love Me Like You Do", at the 2015 AFL Grand Final on 3 October as part of the pre-match entertainment.

== Track listings ==
German CD single
No.	Title	Writer(s)	Length
1.	"Burn"	Ryan Tedder; Ellie Goulding; Greg Kurstin; Noel Zancanella; Brent Kutzle	3:48
2.	"Hearts Without Chains"	Goulding; Fraser T. Smith	3:45

Digital remix EP
No.	Title	Length
1.	"Burn"	3:51
2.	"Burn" (Tiësto's Club Life Remix)	5:17
3.	"Burn" (Mat Zo Remix)	6:42
4.	"Burn" (Maths Time Joy Remix)	4:10

== Credits and personnel ==
Credits adapted from the liner notes of Halcyon Days.

=== Recording ===
- Vocals recorded at Studio at the Palms (Las Vegas, Nevada)
- Mixed at MixStar Studios (Virginia Beach, Virginia)
- Mastered at Whitfield Mastering (London, England)

=== Personnel ===
- Ellie Goulding – vocals
- Greg Kurstin – production, guitar, keyboards, programming, engineering
- Ryan Tedder – vocal production
- Jesse Shatkin – engineering
- Rob Katz – vocal engineering
- Serban Ghenea – mixing
- John Hanes – engineering for mix
- Naweed – mastering

== Charts ==
=== Weekly charts ===
Weekly chart performance
Chart (2013–2014)	Peak position
Australia (ARIA)	6
Austria (Ö3 Austria Top 40)	4
Belgium (Ultratop 50 Flanders)	3
Belgium (Ultratop 50 Wallonia)	8
Brazil (Hot 100 Airplay)	48
Canada Hot 100 (Billboard)	14
CIS Airplay (TopHit)	2
Czech Republic Airplay (ČNS IFPI)	3
Czech Republic Singles Digital (ČNS IFPI)	29
Denmark (Tracklisten)	15
Euro Digital Song Sales (Billboard)	2
Finland (Suomen virallinen lista)	4
Finland Airplay (Radiosoittolista)	17
France (SNEP)	9
Germany (GfK)	4
Greece Digital Song Sales (Billboard)	5
Hungary (Dance Top 40)	25
Hungary (Rádiós Top 40)	1
Hungary (Single Top 40)	5
Ireland (IRMA)	2
Israel International Airplay (Media Forest)	7
Italy (FIMI)	1
Italy Airplay (EarOne)	1
Japan Hot 100 (Billboard)	88
Lebanon (The Official Lebanese Top 20)	3
Luxembourg Digital Song Sales (Billboard)	6
Mexico Anglo (Monitor Latino)	3
Netherlands (Dutch Top 40)	7
Netherlands (Single Top 100)	12
New Zealand (Recorded Music NZ)	7
Norway (VG-lista)	2
Poland Airplay (ZPAV)	3
Poland Dance (ZPAV)	11
Portugal Digital Song Sales (Billboard)	9
Russia Airplay (TopHit)	2
Scottish Singles Sales (Official Charts)	1
Slovakia Airplay (ČNS IFPI)	1
Slovakia Singles Digital (ČNS IFPI)	50
Slovenia (SloTop50)	16
South Africa Airplay (EMA)	4
Spain (Promusicae)	10
Sweden (Sverigetopplistan)	3
Switzerland (Schweizer Hitparade)	5
UK Singles (Official Charts)	1
Ukraine Airplay (TopHit)	17
US Billboard Hot 100	13
US Adult Contemporary (Billboard)	14
US Adult Pop Airplay (Billboard)	7
US Dance Club Songs (Billboard)	22
US Dance Airplay (Billboard)	1
US Pop Airplay (Billboard)	3
US Rhythmic Airplay (Billboard)	21

=== Year-end charts ===
2013 year-end chart performance
Chart (2013)	Position
Australia (ARIA)	34
Austria (Ö3 Austria Top 40)	51
Belgium (Ultratop 50 Flanders)	29
Belgium (Ultratop 50 Wallonia)	56
France (SNEP)	72
Germany (Official German Charts)	44
Hungary (Dance Top 40)	81
Hungary (Rádiós Top 40)	14
Ireland (IRMA)	20
Italy (FIMI)	30
Italy Airplay (EarOne)	33
Netherlands (Dutch Top 40)	41
Netherlands (Single Top 100)	30
Russia Airplay (TopHit)	64
Sweden (Sverigetopplistan)	30
Switzerland (Schweizer Hitparade)	43
Ukraine Airplay (TopHit)	87
UK Singles (OCC)	15

2014 year-end chart performance
Chart (2014)	Position
Belgium (Ultratop 50 Wallonia)	93
Brazil (Crowley)	64
Canada (Canadian Hot 100)	43
France (SNEP)	149
Hungary (Dance Top 40)	62
Hungary (Rádiós Top 40)	62
Italy (FIMI)	72
Russia Airplay (TopHit)	48
Sweden (Sverigetopplistan)	74
Ukraine Airplay (TopHit)	140
US Billboard Hot 100	39
US Adult Contemporary (Billboard)	37
US Adult Top 40 (Billboard)	28
US Dance/Mix Show Airplay (Billboard)	6
US Mainstream Top 40 (Billboard)	21

== Certifications ==
Certifications and sales
Region	Certification	Certified units/sales
Australia (ARIA)	3× Platinum	210,000^{^}
Austria (IFPI Austria)	Gold	15,000^{*}
Belgium (BRMA)	Gold	15,000^{*}
Brazil (Pro-Música Brasil)	Diamond	250,000^{‡}
Germany (BVMI)	Platinum	600,000^{‡}
Italy (FIMI)	2× Platinum	60,000^{‡}
Mexico (AMPROFON)	Platinum	60,000^{*}
New Zealand (RMNZ)	3× Platinum	90,000^{‡}
Spain (Promusicae)	Platinum	40,000^{‡}
Sweden (GLF)	4× Platinum	160,000^{‡}
Switzerland (IFPI Switzerland)	Platinum	30,000^{^}
United Kingdom (BPI)	3× Platinum	1,800,000^{‡}
United States (RIAA)	5× Platinum	5,000,000^{‡}
Streaming
Denmark (IFPI Danmark)	2× Platinum	3,600,000^{†}
Spain (Promusicae)	Platinum	8,000,000^{†}
^{*} Sales figures based on certification alone.^{^} Shipments figures based on certification alone.^{‡} Sales+streaming figures based on certification alone.^{†} Streaming-only figures based on certification alone.

== Release history ==
Release dates and formats
Region	Date	Format(s)	Label	Ref.
Australia	5 July 2013	Digital download	Universal	
Japan	5 July 2013	Digital download	Universal	
New Zealand	5 July 2013	Digital download	Universal	
Norway	5 July 2013	Digital download	Universal	
Portugal	5 July 2013	Digital download	Universal	
Switzerland	5 July 2013	Digital download	Universal	
Spain	8 July 2013	Digital download	Universal	
Belgium	11 July 2013	Digital download	Universal	
Canada	22 July 2013	Digital download	Cherrytree; Interscope	
United States	22 July 2013	Digital download	Cherrytree; Interscope	
Austria	26 July 2013	Digital download	Universal	
Germany	26 July 2013	Digital download	Universal	
Finland	6 August 2013	Digital download	Universal	
Austria	9 August 2013	Digital remix EP	Universal	
Belgium	9 August 2013	Digital remix EP	Universal	
Finland	9 August 2013	Digital remix EP	Universal	
Germany	9 August 2013	CD single	Universal	
Ireland	9 August 2013	Digital download; digital remix EP	Polydor	
Netherlands	9 August 2013	Digital remix EP	Universal	
New Zealand	9 August 2013	Digital remix EP	Universal	
Switzerland	9 August 2013	Digital remix EP	Universal	
United Kingdom	11 August 2013	Digital download; digital remix EP	Polydor	
Norway	12 August 2013	Digital remix EP	Universal	
Portugal	12 August 2013	Digital remix EP	Universal	
France	21 August 2013	Digital download	Universal	
France	29 August 2013	Digital remix EP	Universal	
United States	1 October 2013	Contemporary hit radio	Cherrytree; Interscope	

== See also ==
- List of number-one dance airplay hits of 2014 (U.S.)
- List of number-one hits of 2013 (Italy)
- List of UK singles chart number ones of the 2010s
