= Flashlight (DJ Fresh song) =

Single by DJ Fresh featuring Ellie Goulding
- Released: 28 September 2014
- Recorded: 2012
- Genre: Drum and bass; dubstep; synth-pop
- Length: 3:38 (radio edit); 3:33 (album version)
- Label: Ministry of Sound; Polydor
- Songwriters: The Invisible Men; Dan Stein; Ellie Goulding
- Producer: DJ Fresh

DJ Fresh singles chronology
"Make U Bounce" (2014)	"Flashlight" (2014)	"Gravity" (2015)

Ellie Goulding singles chronology
"Beating Heart" (2014)	"Flashlight" (2014)	"Outside" (2014)

Audio video
- "Flashlight" on YouTube

"Flashlight" is a song by the English record producer DJ Fresh featuring vocals by the English singer Ellie Goulding. It was released as a single on 28 September 2014 in the United Kingdom. The song originally appeared on Goulding's Halcyon Days (2013), the reissue of her second studio album, Halcyon (2012). The Invisible Men assisted the artists in writing the song.

== Background ==
In an interview with Capital FM on 9 February 2014, DJ Fresh said that he and Goulding had recorded a new version of the song "Flashlight" for single release later in 2014.

== Track listing ==
Digital download
No.	Title	Length
1.	"Flashlight" (radio edit)	3:38

Digital download – EP
No.	Title	Length
1.	"Flashlight" (radio edit)	3:38
2.	"Flashlight" (Metrik remix)	4:41
3.	"Flashlight" (Jack Beats '4AM' remix)	5:31
4.	"Flashlight" (Cahill remix)	6:59
5.	"Flashlight" (Tazer remix)	5:29

== Charts ==
Chart (2014)	Peak position
Belgium Dance (Ultratop Flanders)	17
Belgium (Ultratip Bubbling Under Flanders)	21
Scottish Singles Sales (Official Charts)	36
UK Singles (Official Charts)	47
UK Indie (Official Charts)	1

== Release history ==
Region	Date	Format	Label
United Kingdom	23 August 2013	Digital download	Ministry of Sound; Polydor
