= How Long Will I Love You? =

1990 single by the Waterboys

Single by the Waterboys

from the album Room to Roam
- Released: 1990
- Recorded: Spiddal House (Spiddal, Ireland)
- Genre: Folk rock
- Length: 2:48
- Label: Ensign
- Songwriter: Mike Scott
- Producers: Barry Beckett; Mike Scott

The Waterboys singles chronology
"And a Bang on the Ear" (1989)	"How Long Will I Love You?" (1990)	"A Man Is in Love" (1991)

"How Long Will I Love You?" is a song by the folk rock band the Waterboys from their fifth studio album, Room to Roam (1990). Written by Mike Scott, it was released as the album's lead single. The song was subsequently covered by the English singer Ellie Goulding and released as the second single from her album Halcyon Days (2013). Goulding's version is included on the soundtrack to the 2013 film About Time, which also features a different cover by Jon Boden, Sam Sweeney and Ben Coleman.

The Waterboys' version is immediately followed by She's All That I Need, a short song which has not been included separately on the tracklist of Room to Roam.

== Release ==
"How Long Will I Love You?" was given a single release in Ireland and certain European countries, but not the UK or US. A special sleeve was designed for the single's release in Ireland. The B-side, "Come Live with Me", is a cover of the Felice and Boudleaux Bryant-penned song. The Waterboys recorded the song after Anthony Thistlethwaite attended a Ray Charles concert and fell in love with the song. It was recorded during the sessions for Fisherman's Blues, but it was not released at the time. After appearing on a UK bootleg, it received its first official release on the "How Long Will I Love You?" single.

== Track listings ==
- Ireland 12-inch single and German CD single
1. "How Long Will I Love You?" – 2:49
2. "When Will We Be Married?" – 2:57
  - Traditional. Arranged by Mike Scott and Steve Wickham. Produced by Mike Scott and John Dunford.
- French and German 7-inch single
1. "How Long Will I Love You?" – 2:49
2. "Come Live with Me" – 7:23
  - Composed by Felice and Boudleaux Bryant. Produced by Mike Scott.

== Charts ==
Chart performance for "How Long Will I Love You?"
Chart (1990)	Peak position
Australia (ARIA)	165
Ireland (IRMA)	28

== Ellie Goulding version ==
"How Long Will I Love You"

Single by Ellie Goulding

from the album Halcyon Days
- Released: 10 November 2013
- Genre: Pop
- Length: 2:34
- Label: Polydor
- Songwriter: Mike Scott
- Producer: John Fortis

Ellie Goulding singles chronology
"Burn" (2013)	"How Long Will I Love You" (2013)	"Goodness Gracious" (2014)

Music videos
- "How Long Will I Love You" (About Time version) on YouTube; "How Long Will I Love You" (Tom & Issy version) on YouTube

"How Long Will I Love You" was covered by English singer Ellie Goulding for Halcyon Days (2013), the reissue of her second studio album, Halcyon (2012). Released on 10 November 2013 as the second single from the reissue, it also served as the official song for the BBC's 2013 Children in Need appeal. It is also on the soundtrack to the 2013 Richard Curtis film About Time, although her version is not featured in the film itself. Goulding performed "How Long Will I Love You" live in the BBC Children in Need appeal show on BBC One on 15 November 2013.

"She changed a couple of the lines", Mike Scott said of Goulding's version. "I'm not sure if she did it deliberately. I don't think they're as good as the original lines, but good for her. I do the same thing myself. I've changed Dylan's words, so I can't really complain if somebody changes mine."

=== Commercial performance ===
"How Long Will I Love You" was a commercial success for Goulding and notably a bigger success than its original. It peaked at number three on the UK Singles Chart, selling 82,872 copies. It reached the top ten in a total of 7 charts, and reached the top twenty in a total of 11 charts. Since its release it has appeared on 16 different charts. The song has appeared inside the top 50 and the UK year end list in both 2013 and 2014 respectively.

In Goulding's native United Kingdom it has been Certified 2× platinum for sales of 1,200,000 Unites and sales. It has been certified Gold in 6 countries, Australia, the United States, New Zealand, Denmark, Sweden and Belgium.

The music video for "How Long Will I Love You" was directed by Mike Sharpe and released on 9 September 2013. The video shows Goulding walking along a beach, intercut with footage from About Time.

A second music video premiered on Goulding's official Vevo channel on 28 October 2013, and contains scenes from the short film Tom & Issy, directed by Roger Michell and starring Goulding and Dylan Edwards. The video was shot entirely on a Nokia Lumia 1020.

=== Track listing ===
- UK CD single and digital download
1. "How Long Will I Love You" – 2:34

=== Credits and personnel ===
Credits adapted from the liner notes of Halcyon Days.

Recording

- Mixed at Sentinel Sound
- Mastered at Whitfield Mastering (London, England)

Personnel

- Ellie Goulding – vocals
- John Fortis – production, bass, keyboards
- Joe Kearns – engineering
- Richard Kayvan – engineering, mixing
- Ashley Krajewski – engineering, percussion
- Nick Cornu – guitar
- Chris Ketley – piano
- Kirsty Mangan – violin, viola
- Rachael Lander – cello
- Naweed – mastering

=== Charts ===
==== Weekly charts ====
Weekly chart performance
Chart (2013–2014)	Peak position
Australia (ARIA)	46
Belgium (Ultratop 50 Flanders)	3
Belgium (Ultratop 50 Wallonia)	47
Brazil (Brasil Hot 100 Airplay)	72
Czech Republic Singles Digital (ČNS IFPI)	97
Euro Digital Song Sales (Billboard)	4
Finland Airplay (Radiosoittolista)	35
Iceland (RÚV)	17
Ireland (IRMA)	3
Lebanon (Lebanese Top 20)	13
New Zealand (Recorded Music NZ)	6
Scottish Singles Sales (Official Charts)	2
Slovakia Airplay (ČNS IFPI)	12
South Korea International Singles (Gaon)	1
Sweden (Sverigetopplistan)	58
Switzerland (Schweizer Hitparade)	16
UK Singles (Official Charts)	3

==== Year-end charts ====
2013 year-end chart performance
Chart (2013)	Position
UK Singles (OCC)	48

2014 year-end chart performance
Chart (2014)	Position
Belgium (Ultratop 50 Flanders)	31
UK Singles (OCC)	45

=== Certifications and sales ===
Certifications and sales
Region	Certification	Certified units/sales
Australia (ARIA)	Gold	35,000^{^}
Belgium (BRMA)	Gold	15,000^{*}
Brazil (Pro-Música Brasil)	2× Platinum	120,000^{‡}
Denmark (IFPI Danmark)	Gold	45,000^{‡}
New Zealand (RMNZ)	2× Platinum	60,000^{‡}
South Korea (Gaon)	—	451,300
Sweden (GLF)	Gold	20,000^{‡}
United Kingdom (BPI)	3× Platinum	1,800,000^{‡}
United States (RIAA)	Platinum	1,000,000^{‡}
^{*} Sales figures based on certification alone.^{^} Shipments figures based on certification alone.^{‡} Sales+streaming figures based on certification alone.

=== Release history ===
Release dates and formats for "How Long Will I Love You"
Region	Date	Format	Label	Ref.
United Kingdom	10 November 2013	Digital download	Polydor	
United Kingdom	11 November 2013	CD single	Polydor	
