= Goodness Gracious =

2014 single by Ellie Goulding

Single by Ellie Goulding

from the album Halcyon Days
- Released: 21 February 2014
- Recorded: 2013
- Studio: British Grove (London, England); Echo (Los Angeles, California)
- Genre: Electropop
- Length: 3:46
- Label: Polydor
- Songwriters: Greg Kurstin; Ellie Goulding; Nate Ruess
- Producer: Greg Kurstin

Ellie Goulding singles chronology
| "How Long Will I Love You" (2013) | "Goodness Gracious" (2014) | "Beating Heart" (2014) |

Music video
- "Goodness Gracious" on YouTube

"Goodness Gracious" is a song by English singer Ellie Goulding from Halcyon Days (2013), the reissue of her second studio album, Halcyon (2012). The song was written by Greg Kurstin, Goulding and Nate Ruess. It was released on 21 February 2014 as the third and final single from the reissue.

== Background ==
Goulding explained the meaning behind "Goodness Gracious" to Rolling Stone, saying, "I've been in situations where I knew someone wasn't right for me, yet I kept bringing them back", adding that the song "is about dissing yourself for not thinking straight and not being fair."

== Commercial performance ==
After entering the UK Singles Chart at number 124, "Goodness Gracious" climbed to number 86 with 2,867 copies sold. The song rose to number 49 the following week, selling 5,061 copies. In its fourth week on the chart, the single sold 7,254 copies to climb to number 36. In its sixth week, "Goodness Gracious" jumped from number 26 to number 16 with sales of 16,233 copies, becoming Goulding's tenth UK top-20 entry.

== Music video ==
Goulding unveiled a teaser trailer for the music video for "Goodness Gracious" on 31 December 2013. The video, directed by Kinga Burza, was filmed on location in Los Angeles, and premiered on 5 January 2014.

== Track listings ==
Digital download
| No. | Title | Length |
|---|---|---|
| 1. | "Goodness Gracious" | 3:46 |
| 2. | "Goodness Gracious" (Chainsmokers Extended Remix) | 4:19 |
| 3. | "Goodness Gracious" (Honest Remix) | 4:36 |

Digital download – The Chainsmokers Extended Remix
| No. | Title | Length |
|---|---|---|
| 1. | "Goodness Gracious" (The Chainsmokers Extended Remix) | 4:19 |

== Credits and personnel ==
Credits adapted from the liner notes of Halcyon Days.

=== Recording ===
- Vocals recorded at British Grove Studios (London, England) and Echo Studios (Los Angeles, California)
- Mixed at MixStar Studios (Virginia Beach, Virginia)
- Mastered at Whitfield Mastering (London, England)

=== Personnel ===
- Ellie Goulding – vocals
- Joe Kearns – vocal production, vocal engineering
- Greg Kurstin – vocal production, engineering, keyboards, programming
- Jesse Shatkin – additional engineering
- Alex Pasco – additional engineering
- Nate Ruess – backing vocals
- Serban Ghenea – mixing
- John Hanes – engineering for mix
- Naweed – mastering

== Charts ==
Chart performance for "Goodness Gracious"
| Chart (2014) | Peak position |
|---|---|
| Australia (ARIA) | 39 |
| Belgium (Ultratip Bubbling Under Flanders) | 5 |
| Belgium (Ultratip Bubbling Under Wallonia) | 19 |
| Czech Republic Airplay (ČNS IFPI) | 25 |
| Ireland (IRMA) | 10 |
| Scottish Singles Sales (Official Charts) | 13 |
| Slovakia Airplay (ČNS IFPI) | 25 |
| UK Singles (Official Charts) | 16 |

== Release history ==
Release dates and formats for "Goodness Gracious"
| Region | Date | Format | Version | Label | Ref. |
|---|---|---|---|---|---|
| Australia | 21 February 2014 | Digital download | Original | Universal | |
| Austria | 21 February 2014 | Digital download | Original | Universal | |
| Finland | 21 February 2014 | Digital download | Original | Universal | |
| Ireland | 21 February 2014 | Digital download | Original | Polydor | |
| Netherlands | 21 February 2014 | Digital download | Original | Universal | |
| New Zealand | 21 February 2014 | Digital download | Original | Universal | |
| Switzerland | 21 February 2014 | Digital download | Original | Universal | |
| United Kingdom | 23 February 2014 | Digital download | Original | Polydor | |
| Belgium | 24 February 2014 | Digital download | Original | Universal | |
| Italy | 24 February 2014 | Digital download | Original | Universal | |
| Norway | 24 February 2014 | Digital download | Original | Universal | |
| Portugal | 24 February 2014 | Digital download | Original | Universal | |
| Spain | 24 February 2014 | Digital download | Original | Universal | |
| Sweden | 24 February 2014 | Digital download | Original | Universal | |
| Australia | 18 April 2014 | Digital download | The Chainsmokers Extended Remix | Universal | |
| Finland | 18 April 2014 | Digital download | The Chainsmokers Extended Remix | Universal | |
| Netherlands | 18 April 2014 | Digital download | The Chainsmokers Extended Remix | Universal | |
| New Zealand | 18 April 2014 | Digital download | The Chainsmokers Extended Remix | Universal | |
| Switzerland | 18 April 2014 | Digital download | The Chainsmokers Extended Remix | Universal | |
| Belgium | 21 April 2014 | Digital download | The Chainsmokers Extended Remix | Universal | |
| Italy | 21 April 2014 | Digital download | The Chainsmokers Extended Remix | Universal | |
| Norway | 21 April 2014 | Digital download | The Chainsmokers Extended Remix | Universal | |
| Portugal | 21 April 2014 | Digital download | The Chainsmokers Extended Remix | Universal | |
| Spain | 21 April 2014 | Digital download | The Chainsmokers Extended Remix | Universal | |
| Sweden | 21 April 2014 | Digital download | The Chainsmokers Extended Remix | Universal | |
| Canada | 22 April 2014 | Digital download | The Chainsmokers Extended Remix | Cherrytree; Interscope | |
| United States | 22 April 2014 | Digital download | The Chainsmokers Extended Remix | Cherrytree; Interscope | |
| Austria | 23 April 2014 | Digital download | The Chainsmokers Extended Remix | Universal | |

== See also ==
- The dictionary definition of goodness gracious at Wiktionary
