= You My Everything =

- CD single cover artwork

Promotional single by Ellie Goulding

from the album Halcyon Days
- Released: 29 July 2013
- Length: 3:29
- Label: Polydor
- Songwriters: Ellie Goulding; Eg White
- Producer: Robbie Lamond

Ellie Goulding promotional singles chronology
"Hanging On" (2012)	"You My Everything" (2013)	"Fall into the Sky" (2014)

Alternative cover
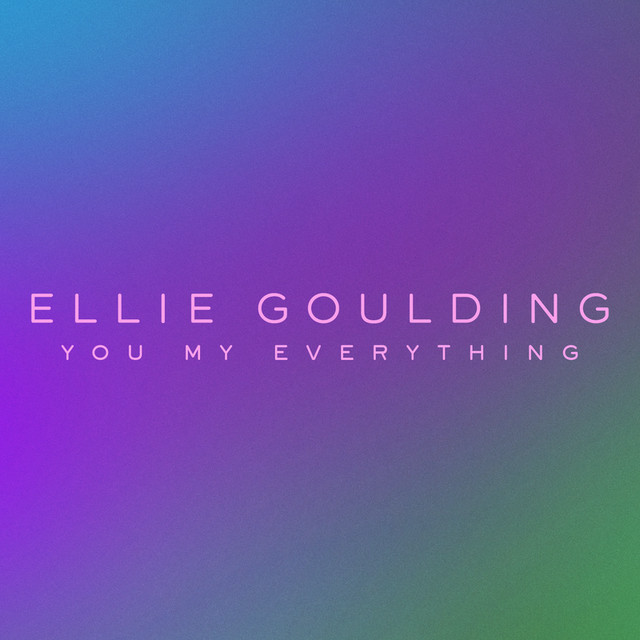
- Digital single cover artwork

Lyric video
- "You My Everything" on YouTube

"You My Everything" is a song by English singer Ellie Goulding from Halcyon Days (2013), the reissue of her second studio album, Halcyon (2012). It was released on 29 July 2013, as the first promotional single from the reissue. Goulding and Eg White wrote the song, while Robbie Lamond produced it. (Note: Although various media outlets credited only Jim Eliot as the main producer of "You My Everything", Lamond is only credited as the main producer of the song.) Originally recorded during the Halcyon's recording sessions, "You My Everything" first premiered on the British teen drama Skins's final episode. The song's chorus features elements of 1980s dance music.

== Background and promotion ==
"You My Everything" originated during the recording sessions for Goulding's second studio album, Halcyon (2012). The song premiered in "Fire", a final episode of the British teen drama Skins. She performed it during the Apple Music Festival in September 2025.

== Composition ==
"You My Everything" is 3 minutes and 29 seconds long. Goulding co-wrote the song with Eg White, who also produced the vocals. Robbie Lamond served as the song's producer and contributed strings, programming, piano, organ, guitar and drums. Additional production was provided by Sigma, while the track was mixed by Robert Orton at Hot Rocks Studios. "You My Everything" features ambient soundscapes, synthesiser-driven production and drum-and-bass elements. MTV's Jenna Hally Rubenstein believed that Goulding's ethereal vocals are prominent throughout the song which transitions into an energetic dance-tinged chorus influenced by 1980s music.

== Personnel ==
Credits were adapted from the liner notes of the deluxe edition.

- Ellie Goulding – songwriter
- Eg White – songwriter, vocal producer
- Robbie Lamond – producer, strings, programming, piano, organ, guitar, drums
- Sigma – additional producer
- Robert Orton – mixing engineer

== Release history ==
Release dates and formats
Region	Date	Format	Label	Ref.
Various	29 July 2013	CD; digital download; streaming	Polydor	
