= Hanging On =

2011 single by Active Child

Song by Active Child

from the album You Are All I See
- Released: August 23, 2011
- Genre: Dream pop; downtempo
- Length: 5:26
- Label: Vagrant
- Songwriters: Patrick James Grossi; Ariel Rechtshaid
- Producer: Ariel Rechtshaid

"Hanging On" is a song by American singer and songwriter Active Child from his debut studio album, You Are All I See (2011). It was written by Active Child and Ariel Rechtshaid, and produced by Rechtshaid. The song's music video, directed by T.S. Pfeffer and Robert McHugh, debuted on January 19, 2012. English singer Ellie Goulding covered "Hanging On" in 2012, while Australian alternative rock band Something for Kate included an acoustic cover of the song as a bonus track on the two-disc special edition of their 2012 album Leave Your Soul to Science.

== Personnel ==
Credits adapted from the liner notes of You Are All I See.

- Active Child – vocals, additional engineering, production
- Ariel Rechtshaid – engineering, mixing, production
- David Schiffman – mixing
- Howie Weinberg – mastering

== Ellie Goulding version ==
"Hanging On"

Promotional single by Ellie Goulding featuring Tinie Tempah

from the album Halcyon
- Released: 10 July 2012
- Recorded: 2012
- Studio: Red Rhino (Montreal, Quebec)
- Length: 3:22 (album version); 4:16 (featuring Tinie Tempah)
- Label: Polydor
- Songwriters: Patrick James Grossi; Ariel Rechtshaid; Patrick Okogwu
- Producer: Billboard

Ellie Goulding promotional singles chronology
"Wish I Stayed" (2009)	"Hanging On" (2012)	"You My Everything" (2013)

In 2012, "Hanging On" was covered by English singer and songwriter Ellie Goulding for her second studio album, Halcyon. An alternative version featuring English rapper Tinie Tempah was released as a free download on 10 July 2012 via Goulding's SoundCloud page, serving as a promotional single for the album. The accompanying music video was directed by Ben Newbury and released on 13 July.

Goulding's cover version was featured in the Gossip Girl episode "The Revengers", the Nikita episode "Til Death Do Us Part" and on the soundtrack to the 2013 film adaptation of The Host. In February 2013, the Living Phantoms remix of the song was used in the "From Ashes" live-action trailer for the PlayStation 3 video game God of War: Ascension. The remix of the song by I See MONSTAS was included on the soundtrack to the 2014 film adaption of Divergent in addition to the original version appearing in the film.

=== Personnel ===
Credits were adapted from the liner notes of Halcyon.

- Ellie Goulding – vocals
- Ben Baptie – mixing assistant
- Billboard – production
- Philippe Dumais – assistant engineering
- Tom Elmhirst – mixing
- Tinie Tempah – vocals
- Richard Vincent – engineering

=== Charts ===
Chart (2012)	Peak position
UK Singles Chart	144

=== Certifications ===
Region	Certification	Certified units/sales
United States (RIAA)	Gold	500,000^{‡}
^{‡} Sales+streaming figures based on certification alone.
