= Beating Heart (Ellie Goulding song) =

Single by Ellie Goulding

from the album Divergent: Original Motion Picture Soundtrack
- Released: 22 April 2014
- Studio: British Grove (London, England); Echo (Los Angeles, California)
- Genre: Electropop
- Length: 3:32
- Label: Interscope
- Songwriters: Ellie Goulding; Joe Janiak
- Producer: Greg Kurstin

Ellie Goulding singles chronology
"Goodness Gracious" (2014)	"Beating Heart" (2014)	"Flashlight" (2014)

The Divergent Series singles chronology
Find You (2014)	Beating Heart (2014)	Warriors (2014)

Music video
- "Beating Heart" on YouTube

"Beating Heart" is a song recorded by English singer Ellie Goulding for the soundtrack to the film Divergent (2014). The song was written by Goulding and Joe Janiak, and produced by Greg Kurstin. It was released on 22 April 2014 as the second single from the soundtrack.

== Background and composition ==
British singer-songwriter Joe Janiak wrote the original version of "Beating Heart" on banjo in 2012. He took inspiration from dropping off his American girlfriend at the London airport, before Goulding heard the song and reworked some of the lyrics. On 23 January 2014, it was confirmed that Goulding's "Beating Heart" would be included on the soundtrack to the 2014 film Divergent, based on the dystopian novel of the same name by Veronica Roth. According to Divergent director Neil Burger, "We started working on the film with songs from Ellie Goulding's album Halcyon and soon found that the texture of her music and the tone of her voice matched perfectly with our film." In an interview with Matt Lauer on the American morning television show Today on 12 March, Goulding said, "I had the song, and I performed it and recorded it, and I had given it to Greg Kurstin to produce it. I didn't know they were gonna use it for the film, but actually, when I thought about it, I thought it was kind of perfect, and it really suited the whole theme." The song plays over the end credits of Divergent.

While filming the music video for "Beating Heart", Goulding told MTV News that the song is about "being away from someone or knowing that you're always going to have to be apart from someone that you really love." She added, "And it's painful, but it's hopeful because there's always a chance that they'll collide again like two people collide. Like the universe will bring them back together. I think the song is basically that. Sort of relying on the fact that if you're meant to be drawn back together you will be."

== Release and promotion ==
A lyric video for "Beating Heart" premiered on the Entertainment Weekly website on 24 February 2014, featuring scenes from Divergent. That same day, the song debuted on BBC Radio 1 as Zane Lowe's Hottest Record. On 25 February, the track was made available for pre-order as part of the Divergent soundtrack album on iTunes in North America. "Beating Heart" was serviced to contemporary hit radio stations in the United States on 22 April 2014.

Goulding appeared on the NBC morning television show Today on 12 March 2014 to perform an acoustic version of the song. On 13 April, Goulding performed "Beating Heart" at the 2014 MTV Movie Awards, followed by a performance of Zedd's song "Find You"—also from the Divergent soundtrack—featuring Matthew Koma and Miriam Bryant. She also performed the song on The Ellen DeGeneres Show on 15 April.

== Commercial performance ==
"Beating Heart" made its first chart appearance on the Canadian Hot 100, where it debuted and peaked at number 79 on the issue dated 15 March 2014. The song debuted at number 98 on the Billboard Hot 100 chart dated 5 April 2014, having sold 55,000 downloads as of 23 March. The following week, it rose to its peak position of number 88. In Australia, "Beating Heart" entered the ARIA Singles Chart at number 52, peaking at number 38 the following week. The single debuted at number 20 on the New Zealand Singles Chart, falling to number 27 the following week. In early June 2014, "Beating Heart" debuted on the UK Singles Chart at number nine with 23,849 copies sold, becoming Goulding's seventh top-10 single.

== Music video ==
The music video for "Beating Heart" was directed by Ben Newbury, and shows Goulding in her fear landscape. The video begins with Goulding standing in a dark room drinking the simulation serum like the serum in the film and sees herself in a simulation, where she is in a misty forest. She meets a mysterious young man (model Diego Barrueco) in the forest, and as she turns to walk away, she is pulled closer to him. The simulation ends and Goulding is seen standing in the same dark room.

Following the premiere of the video on 11 March 2014 on MTV and MTV.com, Goulding joined Divergent stars Shailene Woodley and Theo James for an interview with MTV News correspondent Christina Garibaldi to discuss the film, streaming live from MTV's New York City studio. The video was made available exclusively for 24 hours on MTV.com after it premiered. On 28 March 2014, the music video was uploaded to Goulding's official YouTube account.

== Track listings ==
Digital download
No.	Title	Length
1.	"Beating Heart"	3:32

Digital EP
No.	Title	Length
1.	"Beating Heart"	3:32
2.	"Beating Heart" (Motez Remix)	5:21
3.	"Beating Heart" (Vindata Remix)	4:48
4.	"Beating Heart" (Dexcell Remix)	5:18

== Credits and personnel ==
Credits adapted from the liner notes of Divergent: Original Motion Picture Soundtrack.

=== Recording ===
- Vocals recorded at British Grove Studios (London, England)
- Production recorded at Echo Studios (Los Angeles, California)
- Mixed at MixStar Studios (Virginia Beach, Virginia)
- Mastered at Whitfield Mastering (London, England)

=== Personnel ===
- Ellie Goulding – vocals
- Greg Kurstin – production, engineering, vocal production, keyboards, drums
- Alex Pasco – additional engineering
- Joe Kearns – co-production, vocal recording
- Andy Cook – vocal recording assistance
- Serban Ghenea – mixing
- John Hanes – engineering for mix
- Naweed Ahmed – mastering

== Charts ==
Chart performance for "Beating Heart"
Chart (2014)	Peak position
Australia (ARIA)	38
Belgium (Ultratip Bubbling Under Flanders)	2
Belgium (Ultratip Bubbling Under Wallonia)	7
Canada Hot 100 (Billboard)	79
Czech Republic Singles Digital (ČNS IFPI)	96
Euro Digital Song Sales (Billboard)	19
France (SNEP)	84
Ireland (IRMA)	8
New Zealand (Recorded Music NZ)	20
Scottish Singles Sales (Official Charts)	11
Slovakia Airplay (ČNS IFPI)	56
UK Singles (Official Charts)	9
US Billboard Hot 100	88

== Certifications ==
Certifications for "Beating Heart"
Region	Certification	Certified units/sales
Brazil (Pro-Música Brasil)	Gold	30,000^{‡}
New Zealand (RMNZ)	Gold	7,500^{*}
Sweden (GLF)	Gold	20,000^{‡}
United States (RIAA)	Gold	500,000^{‡}
^{*} Sales figures based on certification alone.^{‡} Sales+streaming figures based on certification alone.

== Release history ==
Release dates and formats for "Beating Heart"
Region	Date	Format	Label	Ref.
United States	22 April 2014	Contemporary hit radio	Interscope	
Australia	9 May 2014	Digital download	Universal	
Austria	23 May 2014	Digital download	Universal	
Finland	23 May 2014	Digital download	Universal	
Ireland	23 May 2014	Digital download	Polydor	
Netherlands	23 May 2014	Digital download	Universal	
New Zealand	23 May 2014	Digital download	Universal	
Switzerland	23 May 2014	Digital download	Universal	
United Kingdom	25 May 2014	Digital download	Polydor	
Belgium	26 May 2014	Digital download	Universal	
Denmark	26 May 2014	Digital download	Universal	
Greece	26 May 2014	Digital download	Universal	
Italy	26 May 2014	Digital download	Universal	
Luxembourg	26 May 2014	Digital download	Universal	
Norway	26 May 2014	Digital download	Universal	
Portugal	26 May 2014	Digital download	Universal	
Spain	26 May 2014	Digital download	Universal	
Sweden	26 May 2014	Digital download	Universal	
