= Ellie Goulding =

English singer and songwriter (born 1986)

Ellie Goulding MBE
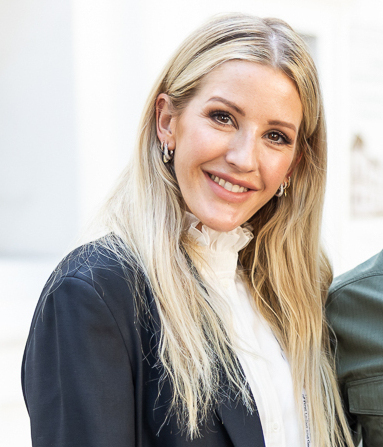
- Goulding in Kyiv, Ukraine, 2022
- Born: Elena Jane Goulding; 30 December 1986 (age 39); Hereford, Herefordshire, England
- Education: University of Kent
- Occupations: Singer; songwriter; activist
- Years active: 2009–present
- Works: Discography; songs recorded
- Spouse: Caspar Jopling (m. 2019; sep. 2024)
- Partner: Beau Minniear (2025–present)
- Children: 2
- Awards: Full list
- Musical career
- Genres: Pop; electropop; synth-pop; indie pop; folktronica
- Instruments: Vocals; guitar; piano; drums; bass guitar
- Labels: Polydor; Neon Gold; Cherrytree; Interscope
- Website: elliegoulding.com

Signature
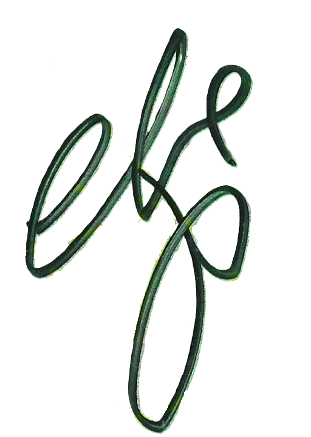

Elena Jane Goulding (/ˈɡoʊldɪŋ/ GOHL-ding; born 30 December 1986) is an English singer-songwriter and activist. She has achieved significant commercial success, earning multiple chart records in the United Kingdom and internationally. Goulding has also received recognition for her songwriting, activism for the environmental movement, humanitarian work and support for LGBTQ people's causes.

Goulding's debut single, "Under the Sheets", was released through Neon Gold Records in 2009, and she signed a recording contract with Polydor Records the same year, releasing her debut extended play (EP), An Introduction to Ellie Goulding. Her debut studio album, Lights (2010), debuted at No. 1 on the UK Albums Chart, and was reissued as Bright Lights, spawning three successful singles: a cover version of Elton John's "Your Song", "Starry Eyed", and "Lights".

Goulding's second studio album, Halcyon (2012), was preceded by its lead single, "Anything Could Happen", and a repackaged edition titled Halcyon Days (2013) produced the single "Burn", which became her first number 1 song on the UK singles chart. She then collaborated with the Scottish DJ and record producer Calvin Harris on two singles: "I Need Your Love" and "Outside". After the release of her third studio album, Delirium (2015), and its lead single, "On My Mind", Goulding received a Grammy Award nomination for her single "Love Me like You Do", which was recorded for the soundtrack of the American erotic film Fifty Shades of Grey (2015).

Goulding took a hiatus from 2016 to 2020, struggling with an anxiety disorder and media scrutiny over false claims about her personal life. Her fourth studio album, Brightest Blue (2020), became her third album to top the UK Albums Chart and her fourth consecutive album certified by the Recording Industry Association of America (RIAA). It spawned several singles including the hits "Close to Me", "Hate Me", and "Sixteen". She reunited with Harris on the single "Miracle", which spent eight non-consecutive weeks at No. 1 on the UK singles chart in 2023. Goulding's fifth studio album, Higher Than Heaven (2023), became her fourth chart-topping album in the UK. This tied her with Adele as the British female with the most number-one albums in UK history. A sixth album, titled I Know Too Much, followed in 2026.

Goulding is the recipient of numerous accolades, including two Brit, a Brits Billion, a Billboard Music, 17 BMI London, and two Grammy Awards nominations. She was honoured with a Decade Award by the Variety Hitmakers Awards in recognition of a decade of "undeniable hits" and Time 100 honoured her with the Impact Award for using her platform to protect the environment. She has sold over 44 million albums and 442 million singles worldwide and has accumulated 55 billion streams, ranking among the best-selling British female artists of the 21st century.

== Early life ==
Elena Jane Goulding was born on 30 December 1986 in Hereford, Herefordshire, England, to Arthur and Tracey Goulding. Her father was a funeral director. She has a brother and two sisters. When she was five years old, her parents separated, after which she had little contact with her father.

Goulding described her family as "super poor". She was brought up in the small village of Lyonshall in Herefordshire, and later on a council estate by her mother, with whom she has a "difficult" relationship.

Goulding began playing the clarinet at the age of 9 and began learning guitar when she was 14. She attended the secondary school Lady Hawkins' School in Kington, Herefordshire, and by the age of 15, she started writing songs. She took A-levels in English, politics, drama and music, and passed three with A grades but failed music. She enrolled on a degree in Drama and Theatre Studies at the University of Kent, but did not complete her studies, quitting in her final year. After meeting Jamie Lillywhite, he became her manager and introduced her to the songwriter, record producer and DJ Starsmith, who would become her chief collaborator and the primary producer of Goulding's debut studio album.

== Career ==
=== 2009–2011: Lights and Bright Lights ===
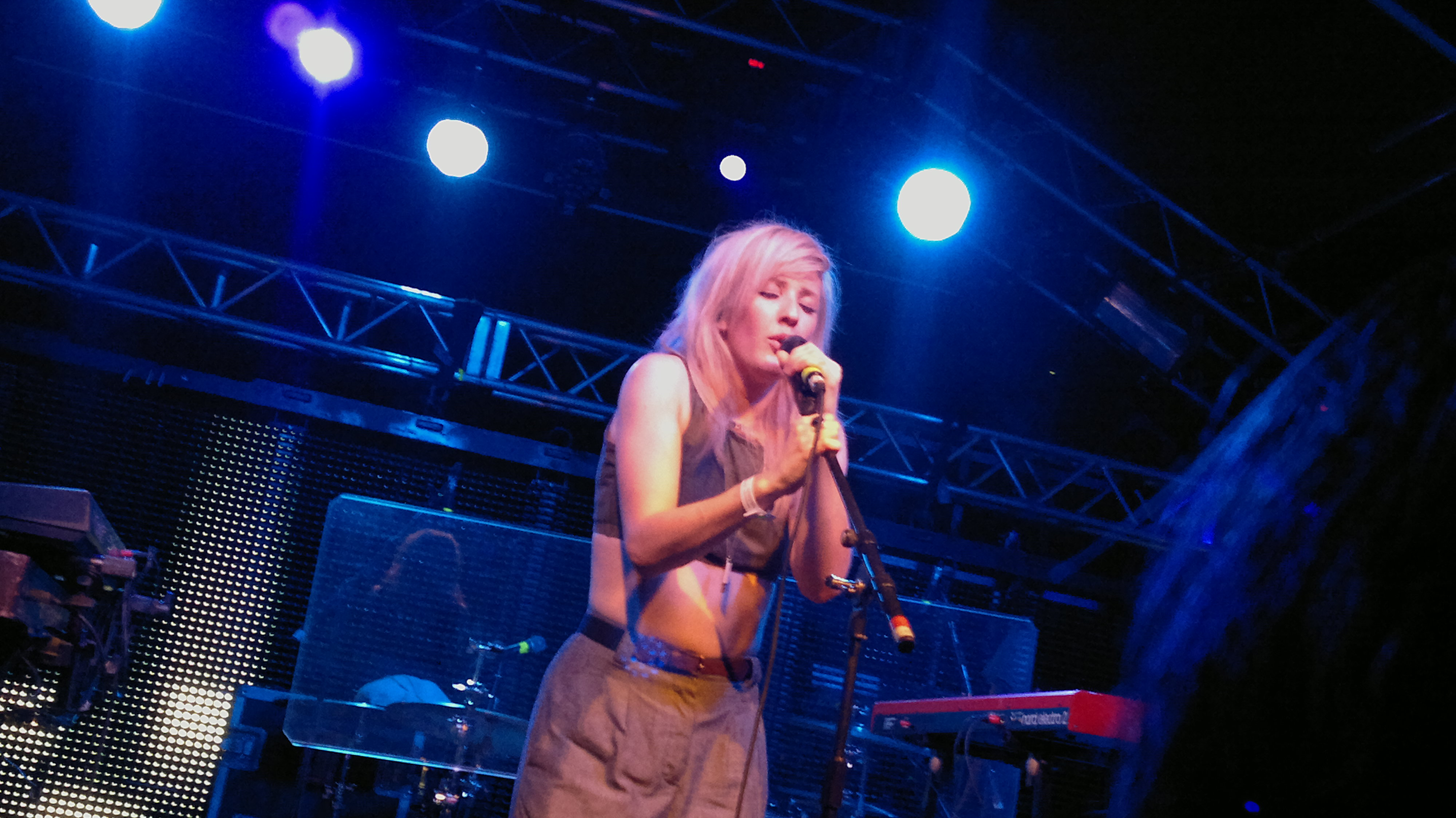
Goulding performing at Nokia World at ExCeL in London, 2010

Following her discovery by the manager Jamie Lillywhite in 2009, Goulding signed to the British record label Polydor Records in July, which released her debut extended play (EP), An Introduction to Ellie Goulding, in December. Her debut single, "Under the Sheets", was released through the independent label Neon Gold Records, appearing digitally in the United Kingdom on 15 November. The single peaked at No. 53 on the UK singles chart following Goulding's appearance on Later... with Jools Holland and a UK tour supporting Little Boots. "Wish I Stayed" became available as a free download as was named "Single of the Week" on iTunes Store UK from 22 to 28 December.

Before the release of her debut studio album, Goulding won the BBC Sound of 2010 poll, which showcased the music industry's top choices for rising stars. She also won the Critics' Choice Award at the Brit Awards 2010, making her the second artist to win both in the same year. She co-wrote "Love Me 'Cause You Want To" for the Australian Gabriella Cilmi and three songs ("Remake Me + You", "Notice", and "Jumping into Rivers") for Diana Vickers. Goulding's song, "Not Following", was used by the German singer Lena Meyer-Landrut on her debut studio album, My Cassette Player (2010). Goulding was featured on rapper Tinie Tempah's single "Wonderman".

Goulding's debut studio album, Lights, was released in March 2010, reaching No. 1 on the UK Albums Chart and No. 6 on the Irish Albums Chart. As of June 2012, Lights had sold over 850,000 copies in the UK and 1.6 million copies worldwide. Its singles—"Starry Eyed", "Guns and Horses", and "The Writer"—peaked at Nos. 4, 26, and 19, respectively. In support of Lights, Goulding embarked on the tour and supported the American indie pop band Passion Pit in March 2010 and John Mayer during his British tour in May. During the summer, she performed at the Dot to Dot Festival in Bristol on 29 May and a set on 25 June at the Glastonbury Festival 2010, on the John Peel Stage. Her third EP was also released, a live recording of part of her set at the iTunes Festival 2010. On 11 July, she made her T in the Park debut. In August, she released her second EP, Run into the Light, containing remixes of songs from Lights. Supported by Nike, the EP was released through Polydor as a running soundtrack in an effort to get her music taken up by the running subculture. In November, Lights was reissued as Bright Lights, featuring six additional new tracks. It was originally announced that the lead single from the re-issue would be the new edit of the title track, scheduled for 1 November. However, the plan was ultimately scrapped, and her cover version of Elton John's "Your Song" was chosen as the lead single; it was released in conjunction with the 2010 television campaign John Lewis Christmas advert in the UK. The single became her second highest-charting single at that time, reaching No. 2 on the UK singles chart.

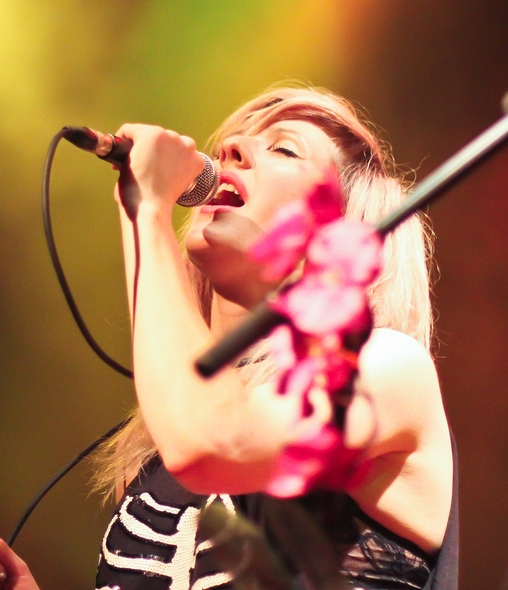
Goulding performing live at The Venue in Vancouver, Canada, 2011

In January 2011, it was announced that the title track from Lights would serve as the second single from Bright Lights. The single reached No. 49 on the UK singles chart and became Goulding's first song to chart in the United States, as well as her highest-charting song to date, peaking at No. 2 on the US Billboard Hot 100. In early that year, she also recorded an original song for the film, Life in a Day. In February, Rolling Stone listed Goulding on No. 5 at annual hot list, and the same month, she returned to the Brit Awards where she was nominated for Best British Female and Best British Breakthrough Act but lost out to Laura Marling and to Tempah. In April, she played live at the Coachella festival in Indio, California. She also made her American television debut on Jimmy Kimmel Live! on 7 April, performing "Starry Eyed", while appearing as the musical guest on the 700th episode of the Saturday Night Live (SNL), broadcast 7 May and hosted by Tina Fey. On 29 April, she performed at the wedding reception of Prince William and Catherine Middleton, and performed what she recalled as "about 14 songs", including her cover version of "Your Song".

Goulding collaborated with the American electronic producer Skrillex on a song titled "Summit", and travelled with him on his South American tour. She also headlined the 2011 Wakestock Festival in Abersoch, Wales, performing on 8 July. In August, she performed at the V Festival for her second year in a row. Following the re-release of Lights, Goulding said that she would soon begin work on a second studio album with an expected release of September. On 6 August, she performed at Lollapalooza in Chicago. On 19 September, it was announced that she would be the opening act for the American singer Katy Perry's California Dreams Tour, replacing Jessie J, who withdrew due to a foot injury. On 1 December, she performed at the White House during the National Christmas Tree lighting, alongside Big Time Rush and will.i.am, and at the annual Nobel Peace Prize Concert on 11 December in Oslo, Norway.

=== 2012–2014: Halcyon and Halcyon Days ===
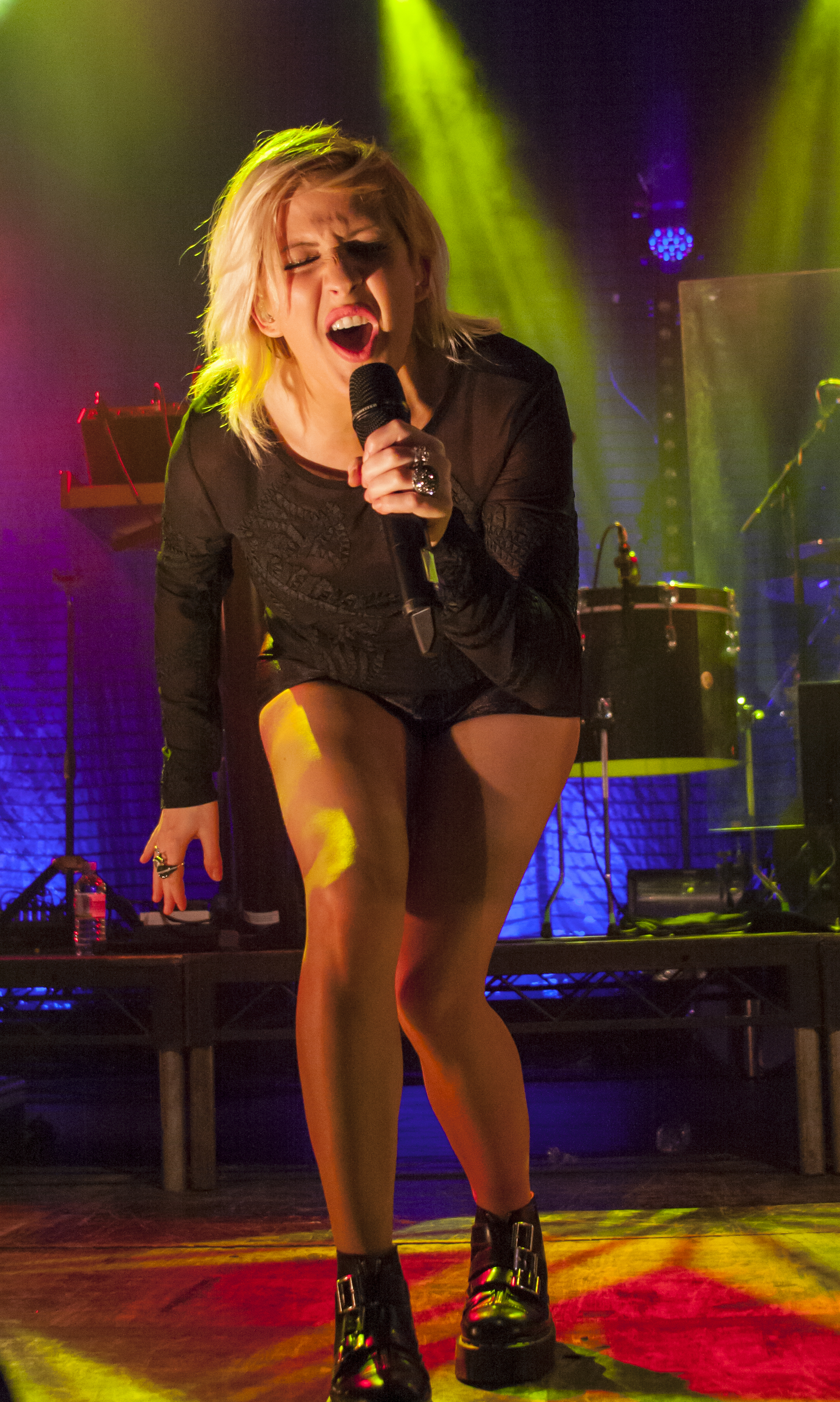
Goulding performing at the Manchester Academy in 2012

In 2012, Goulding appeared on the song "Fall into the Sky" by the German DJ Zedd and on the Scottish singer Calvin Harris's song "I Need Your Love". On 10 July, she released a cover version of the American singer Active Child's song, "Hanging On", featuring Tinie Tempah, as a free download on her SoundCloud. In late July, it was announced that Goulding's second studio album would be titled Halcyon and released on 8 October. The album was preceded by the lead single, "Anything Could Happen", on 9 August. Goulding contributed a track titled "Bittersweet" to the soundtrack of The Twilight Saga: Breaking Dawn – Part 2, released on 13 November. On 19 November, the music video for Halcyon's second single, "Figure 8", was released. The single was released digitally in the UK on 16 December. Before its release, the song entered the top 40 in the UK, peaking at No. 33.

In May 2013, Goulding supported the American singer Bruno Mars on his tour, the Moonshine Jungle Tour, on selected dates. On 20 May, she announced that she would embark on a seven-date tour in the UK during October that year. Goulding's cover of Alt-J's song "Tessellate" was released on 28 May. In June, she performed at previous festivals and concerts including RockNess festival in Inverness, Capital FM Summertime Ball, and Firefly Music Festival at the Woodlands in Dover, Delaware. On 2 July, Goulding premiered "You My Everything" in the first episode of Skins Fire, and confirmed to Elle magazine that Halcyon would be re-released later that year. On 5 July, Goulding confirmed the release of Halcyon Days, a repackaged edition of Halcyon, released on 23 August. The re-release, featuring ten additional tracks, was preceded by the single "Burn", which had been uploaded to Goulding's SoundCloud the previous day. On 7 July, its music video premiered on Goulding's Vevo channel. The track became Goulding's first single to top the UK singles chart. Goulding performed at V Festival Chelmsford when news of her first UK No. 1 broke; the English singer Rita Ora surprised Goulding with her Official Number 1 Award. On 9 September, Goulding released a music video for "How Long Will I Love You" for the film About Time. She also appeared on the soundtrack for the film The Hunger Games: Catching Fire with the track "Mirror". On 15 October, Goulding confirmed on Fearne Cotton's radio show that "How Long Will I Love You" would be the next single for the BBC's Children in Need. On the same day, the Active Child song "Silhouette", on which Goulding features, was also released. Goulding posted an alternative video of "How Long Will I Love You" on her Vevo channel for the short film Tom & Issy on 28 October, in which she also stars. On the final episode of The X Factor on 14 December, she performed a duet with finalist Luke Friend.

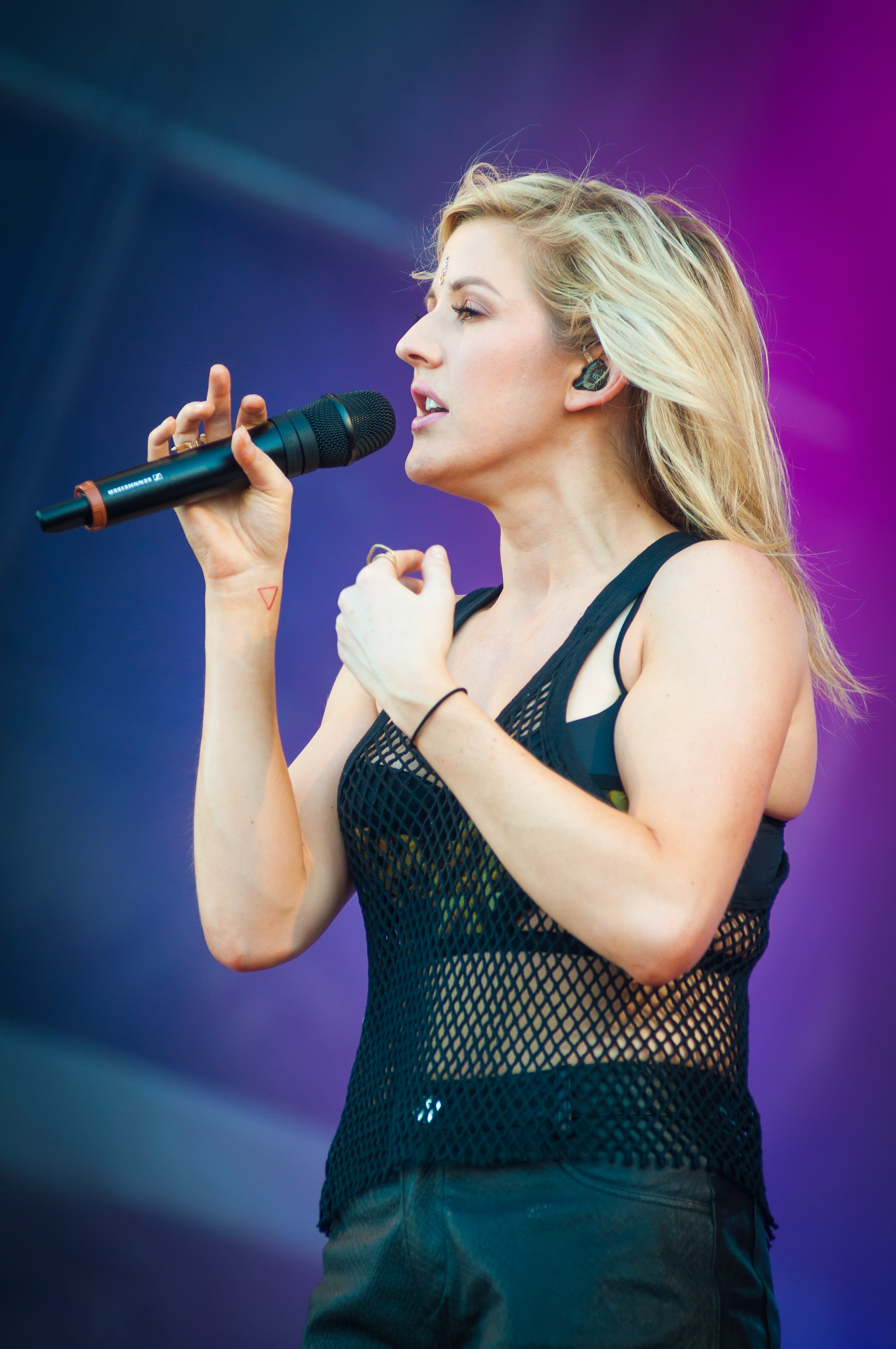
Goulding performing at the Ilosaarirock festival in Joensuu, Finland, 2014

On 5 January 2014, Goulding premiered the music video for her song "Goodness Gracious", later confirming that it would be her sixth single released from Halcyon Days. On 22 January, she confirmed through her Facebook page that she had contributed the song "Beating Heart" to the soundtrack of the film Divergent. On 3 February, Goulding released a cover of James Blake's song, "Life Round Here", featuring the American rapper Angel Haze through her SoundCloud. On 19 February, Goulding won Best British Female Solo Artist at the Brit Awards 2014. She stated on 20 October via Facebook that she would appear on the Harris's fourth studio album, Motion, with a new song "Outside"; it was released as the album's fourth single the same day. Goulding also featured on the Australian rapper Iggy Azalea's song "Heavy Crown", released on 21 November for Azalea's reissue album, Reclassified.

=== 2015–2016: Delirium and subsequent hiatus ===
In November 2014, Goulding announced that she had done "some stuff" for Drake's fourth studio album, Views (2016), who sampled her song. In early 2015, Goulding released "Love Me Like You Do", featured in the soundtrack to the film Fifty Shades of Grey. Its music video was released through her YouTube channel on 22 January, which preceded an official release date of 15 February. The single has been a commercial success, spending four weeks at No. 1 on the UK singles chart and topping the charts in other nations including Australia, New Zealand, and Germany. It also reached No. 3 on the US Billboard Hot 100. The song held the record for the most-streamed track in a single week in the United Kingdom (streamed 2.58 million times) and worldwide (streamed 15.5 million times). On 7 December, "Love Me like You Do" earned Goulding a Grammy Award nomination for Best Pop Solo Performance. In the nominations for the Brit Awards 2016 announced on 14 January 2016, the song was among the nominees for British Single of the Year, and Best British Video.

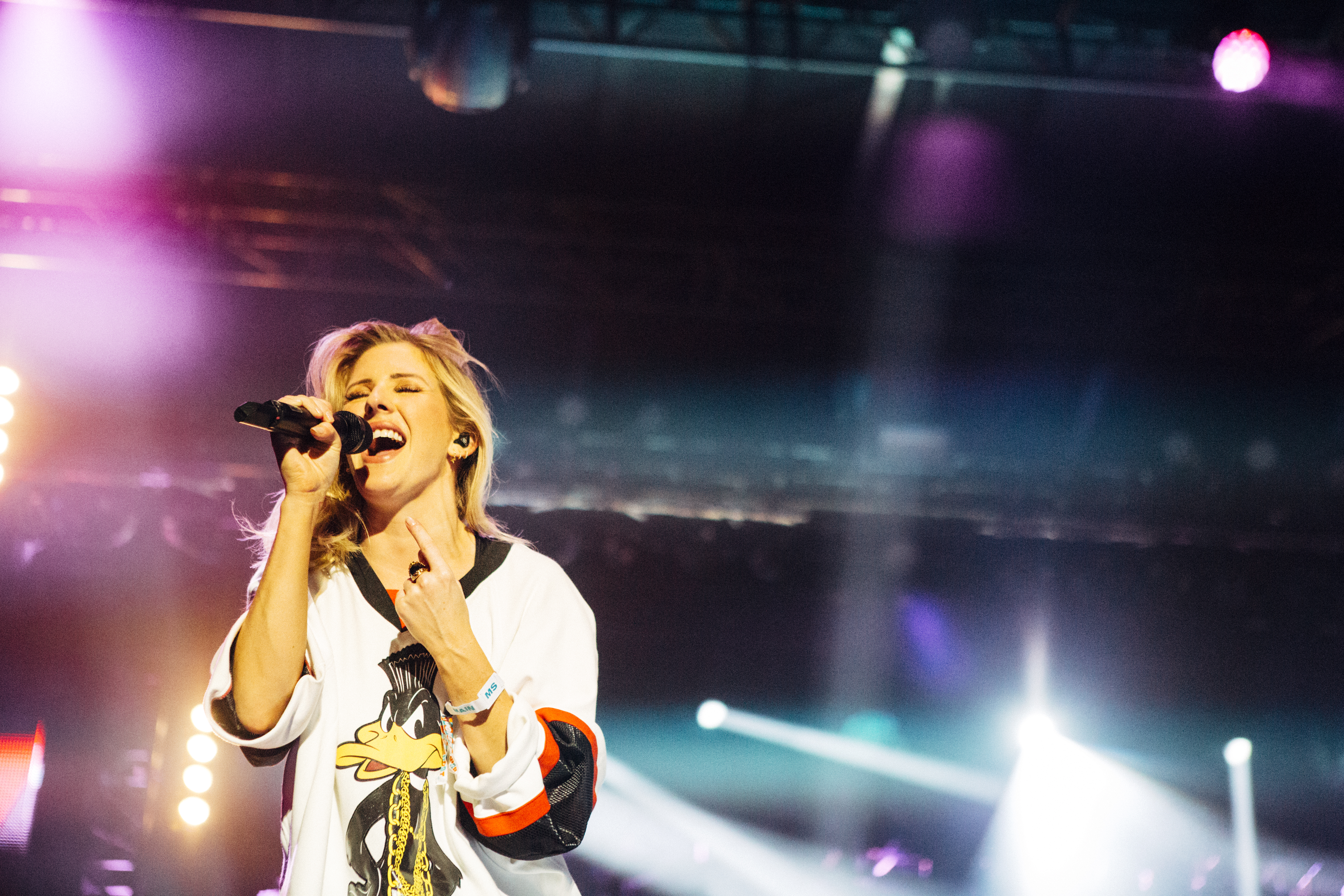
Goulding performing at Bumbershoot in Seattle, 2015

Goulding starred in the music video for Taylor Swift's song "Bad Blood", released in May 2015. She also appeared on Major Lazer's track "Powerful", alongside Tarrus Riley; its preview was revealed on 23 April. Having finished recording new material on 27 July, Goulding tweeted a link to an Instagram post of her leaving Abbey Road Studios captioned, "That's a wrap!". On 5 August, at the iHeartRadio Music Summit, Interscope unveiled the title of Goulding's new single, "On My Mind". On 7 September, it was announced that Goulding would be performing at the 2015 AFL Grand Final, along with the Canadian musician Bryan Adams and the American musician Chris Isaak. On 17 September, she debuted "On My Mind" on BBC Radio 1's Breakfast Show, announcing that her then-upcoming third studio album, Delirium, would be released on 6 November. Its music video directed by Emil Nava followed few days later. Goulding subsequently performed "On My Mind" at the Apple Music Festival later that week. She also appeared on the Australian X Factor in October, where she performed "On My Mind". "Something in the Way You Move" was first released as a promotional single from Delirium on 9 October 2015. Six days later, it was announced that "Army" would be released as a single for the album.

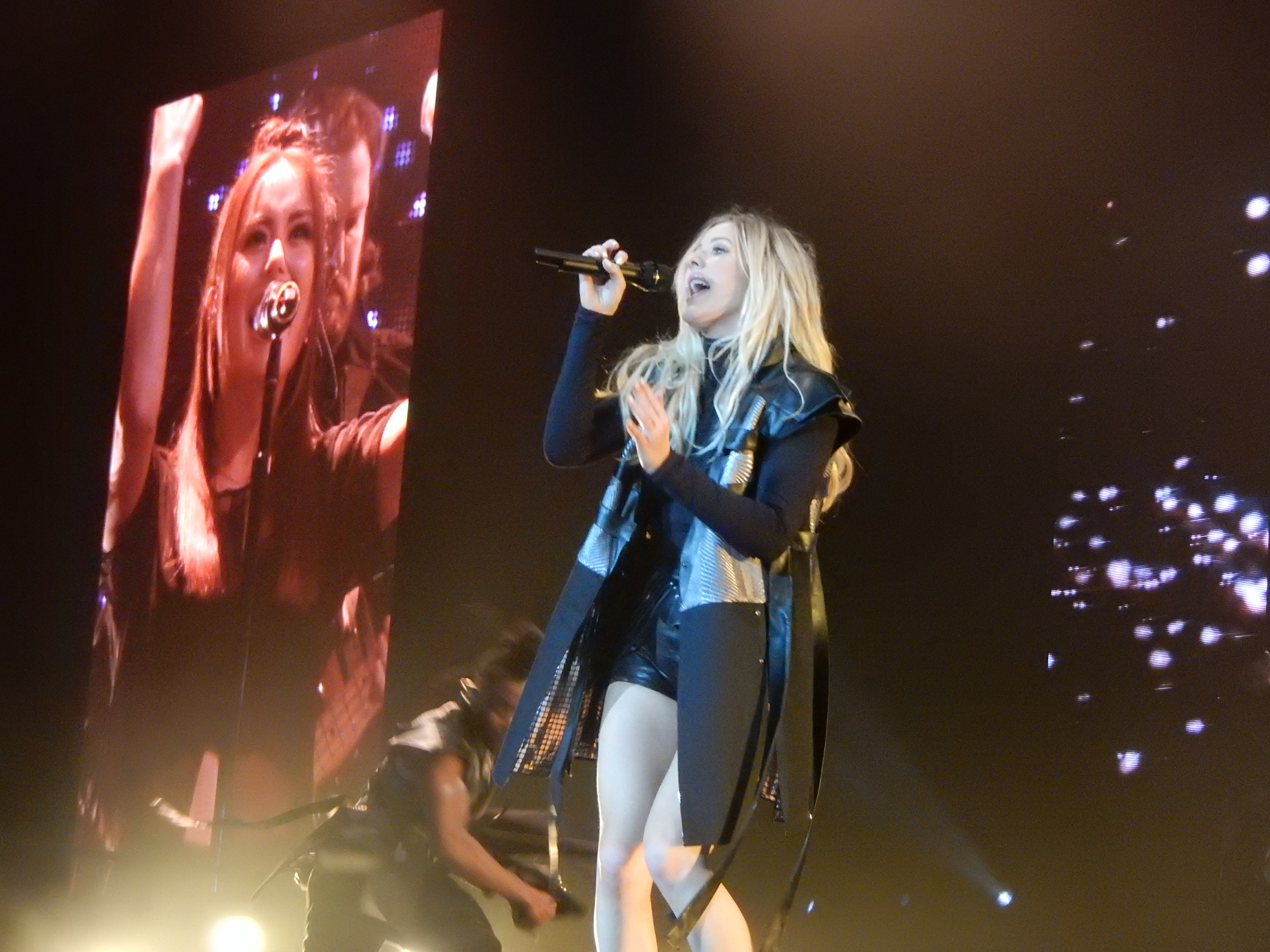
Goulding performing at the O2 Arena in London, 2016

"Army" was sent to radio airplay on 15 January 2016, while its music video was released prior to that day. "Something in the Way You Move" was serviced to US Contemporary hit radio on 19 January, with its original music video on 23 February. On 19 August, Goulding released the song "Still Falling for You" for the soundtrack to the film Bridget Jones's Baby. Its music video premiered on 25 August. It received moderate commercial success, managing to reach No. 11 in the UK.

=== 2017–2019: Hiatus and single releases ===
After taking some months off, in 2017, Goulding performed at the opening of 16th edition of Mawazine festival, held in Rabat, Morocco, from 12 to 20 May. During that period of time, Goulding announced that she was taking some time out the spotlight due to illness, which lasted five years, meanwhile most of her releases were singles in forms of collaborations with other artists or for film soundtracks. Her first stand-alone release was a collaboration with Kygo, "First Time", released on 28 April.

In 2018, Goulding joined Tap Management after a decade with First Access Management. She appeared on a collaboration with Sean Paul on his Mad Love the Prequel EP, titled "Bad Love", released on 29 June. She also collaborated with Diplo and Swae Lee on the single "Close to Me", released on 24 October. On 1 January 2019, The Guardian reported that Goulding had been working on her fourth studio album, set to be released that year. She then released three singles from the album: "Flux", "Sixteen", and "Hate Me" with the American rapper Juice Wrld. In July, Goulding started teasing her return and stated that her next material to be released would be the songs "Woman I Am" and "Start". In November, she released her rendition of Joni Mitchell's Christmas song "River"; it topped the UK singles chart, becoming her third UK number one single and the last UK number one song of the 2010s.

=== 2020–2021: Return and Brightest Blue ===
On 13 March 2020, Goulding released the single "Worry About Me", in collaboration with the American musician Blackbear. In a radio interview with Heart the same month, she revealed that the album "kind of comes in two parts", adding that "the first side is something written entirely by [her] which was fun" and "the second half is [her] kind of alter ego songs." On 21 May and 30 June, she released singles "Power" and "Slow Grenade" (with Lauv), respectively.

Goulding's fourth studio album, Brightest Blue, was released on 17 July. Originally scheduled for June, the album's release was delayed due to the COVID-19 pandemic. It debuted at the top of the UK Albums Chart, becoming Goulding's third album to do so, as well as at number 2 in Scotland. Brightest Blue also spawned hit single "Hate Me", which set a record for Goulding to have the most charted songs of any British female singer on the Hot 100. In support of the album, Goulding performed its accompanying tour, the Brightest Blue Tour, which began on 28 April 2021 at the O_{2} Apollo Manchester and concluded on 12 May at the Olympia Theatre in Dublin, Ireland.

Goulding announced on an Instagram Q&A that she would be releasing new music, which was not part of the Brightest Blue era, at the end of January 2021. That month, she released a collaboration with the British-American superduo Silk City, titled "New Love". During an interview with Joe Wicks in July, she described her forthcoming fifth studio album as "a dance record", adding: "It's electronic pop, a dance thing from outer space." On 30 September, Goulding performed "Anything Could Happen" as part of the opening ceremony for Expo 2020, held in Dubai, United Arab Emirates.

=== 2022–2023: Higher Than Heaven and "Miracle" ===
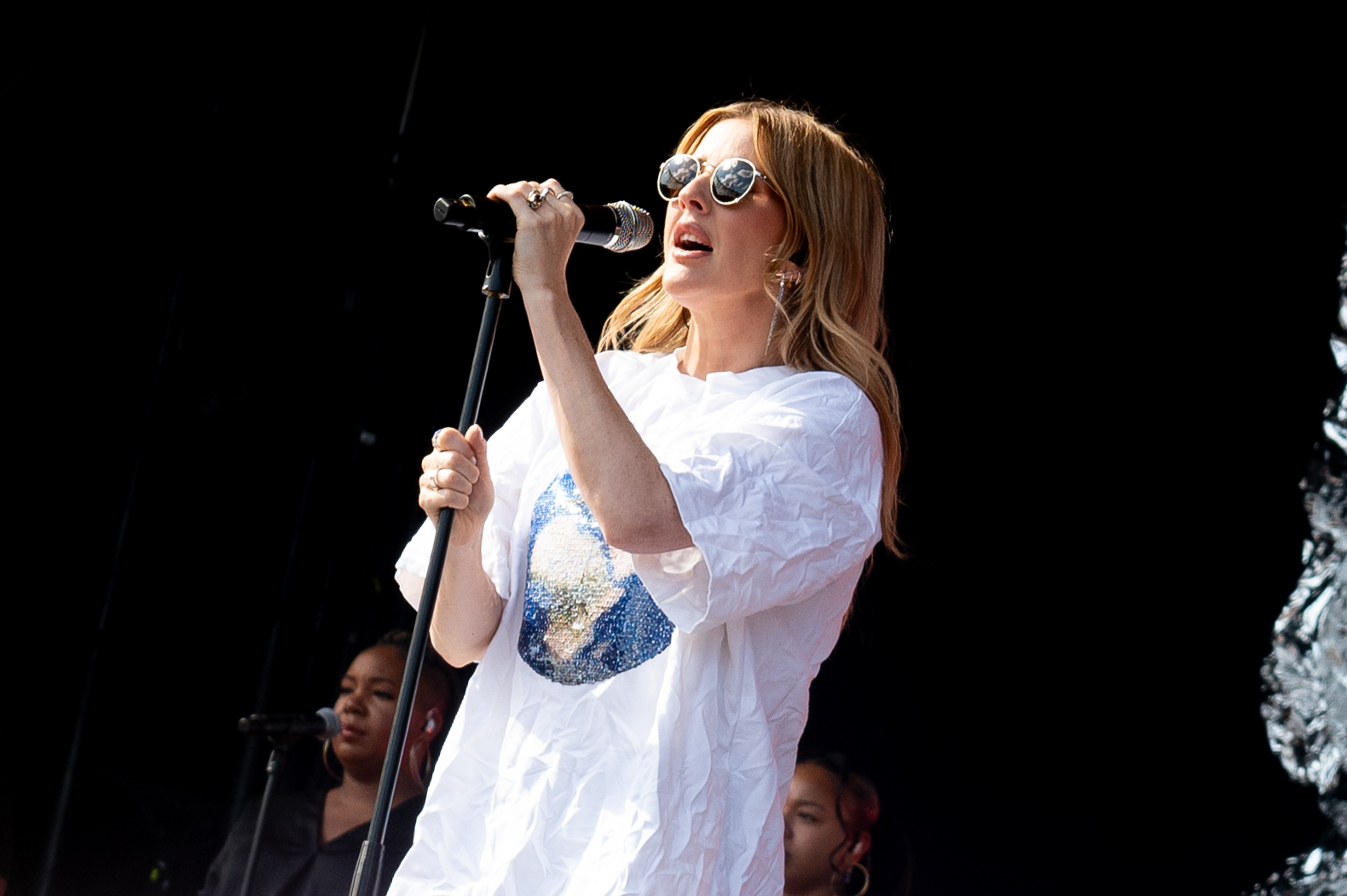
Goulding performing at the Superbloom Festival in Germany, 2023

On 19 June 2022, Goulding performed at Rock in Rio in Lisbon, Portugal. After the concert, she announced that she would be releasing new music in July, blacking out all her social media profiles on the following day. On 4 July, she announced the release of "Easy Lover" featuring Big Sean, which was released on 15 July. The single did not enter the UK Singles Top 100, but peaked at No. 31 on the UK Singles Downloads Chart Top 100. It was followed by "All by Myself", a collaboration between Goulding and the producers Alok and Sigala, on 7 October. Goulding released the single "Let It Die" along with its music video on 19 October and announced that her fifth studio album, Higher Than Heaven, would be released on 3 February 2023. Delayed multiple times, it was released on 7 April 2023.

On 10 March, Goulding released her third collaboration with Harris, "Miracle". A commercial success, it debuted at number three and eventually went to top the UK singles chart, becoming Goulding fourth chart-topper. In its second week at number one, Higher Than Heaven also topped the UK Albums Chart, marking the first time Goulding simultaneously had a number-one single and album in her career. The album became Goulding's fourth chart topper, tying her with Adele as the British female acts with most number one albums in history. Meanwhile, "Miracle" stayed atop the chart for eight non-consecutive weeks, becoming Goulding's longest-running number-one to date. With the song, Goulding earned her second Grammy nomination for Best Pop Dance Recording, and a Brit Award nomination for Song of the Year. As of 26 July 2024, the single is certified two-time platinum by the British Phonographic Industry (BPI).

On 22 March 2023, Goulding released the single, "By the End of the Night". On 3 May, Goulding was presented by the BPI with the prestigious Brit Billion Award. On 14 September, she released the single "Somebody", in collaboration with TSHA and Gregory Porter. On 13 October, Goulding joined the Japanese musician Yoshiki on stage at the Royal Albert Hall in London to perform a classical version of "Love Me like You Do".

=== 2024–present: Collaborations and I Know Too Much ===
On 18 April 2024, Goulding surprise released a remixed version of her song "Brightest Blue" in collaboration with Nature, with the purpose of using the royalties of the song to help environmental causes. During a one-night-only concert at the Royal Albert Hall on 28 April, Goulding performed a new song titled "Easy to Love Me", and hinted that it would be part of her sixth studio album as she stated that she was working on new music. On 9 July, Harris teased his new collaboration with Goulding in Ibiza, Spain. After its title and cover artwork were announced, they performed the single for the first time live in Ibiza. On 26 July, the duo released their fourth collaboration single, "Free". Goulding also provided the lead vocals for Starsmith's single "Leave Me Slowly", released on 16 August. On 8 May, Four Tet teased a new single with Goulding on his social media, titled "In My Dreams". Released on 9 September, it marks their fifth collaboration and first since the Grammy-nominated remix of "Easy Lover". Goulding and J Balvin's remix of DJ Hugel's single "I Adore You" was released on 15 November.

During a press conference on 2 December, Goulding interviewed with The Sun newspaper; she revealed that her sixth studio album would be "very personal", stating that she had a classical album set to be released. On 29 December, Goulding joined DJ Anyma's Sphere residency in Paradise, Nevada as a surprise guest to perform and debut an unreleased song, titled "Hypnotized". Released on 10 January 2025, it was met general acclaim, with Goulding's vocal performance achieving unanimous praise by music critics. On 29 April, it was announced that Goulding would serve as the narrator and music composer alongside Jim Fairfield of environmental documentary, Bee Wild, directed by Rebecca and Josh Tickell. The documentary premiered on 5 June at the SXSW London film festival. A day later, Goulding collaborated with DJs Marshmello and Avion on the single "Save My Love". Goulding also contributed with the closing theme song for the Japanese manga series Clevatess, with the original song "Destiny", which was later released as a single on 12 November. On 27 June, she performed her cover version of "Your Song" at the wedding of Jeff Bezos and Lauren Sánchez in Venice, Italy.

On 4 February 2026, Goulding joined the American singer Halsey on her Back to Badlands Tour to perform "Starry Eyed" at the O2 Academy Brixton. Two days later, Goulding was featured on the track "Don't Want Your Love" from the American DJ Illenium's sixth studio album, Odyssey. In June, Goulding revealed her upcoming sixth studio album, I Know Too Much, set to be released in September. Its lead single "Black Prada Dress" was also announced, released on 5 June. On 23 June, it was announced that Goulding would be featured on Muse's tenth studio album, The Wow! Signal, on the track "Hush" released on 26 June. On 4 July, Goulding attended the wedding of Taylor Swift and Travis Kelce at the Madison Square Garden in Manhattan, New York City. On 10 July, Goulding announced that she would perform at the halftime show of England's FIFA World Cup quarter-final against Norway. She performed "Outside" and "Lights" at Hard Rock Stadium in Miami Gardens, Florida a day later.

In August, Goulding filed a lawsuit against her former managers, Ben Mawson and Ed Millett of TaP Management, with which she had parted ways in December 2025 after eight years of management. She alleged that they failed to disclose that TaP's parent company, HNOE, was owned by Live Nation Entertainment and had conflicts of interest in their dealings with her. The lawsuit claimed that Goulding entered agreements with Live Nation-affiliated companies for touring, merchandise, and a documentary during their management of her from 2018 to 2025.

On 23 October 2026, Goulding is set to release a song for the soundtrack of the third season of Nobody Wants This, entitled "Pray For Me".

== Artistry ==
=== Influences ===
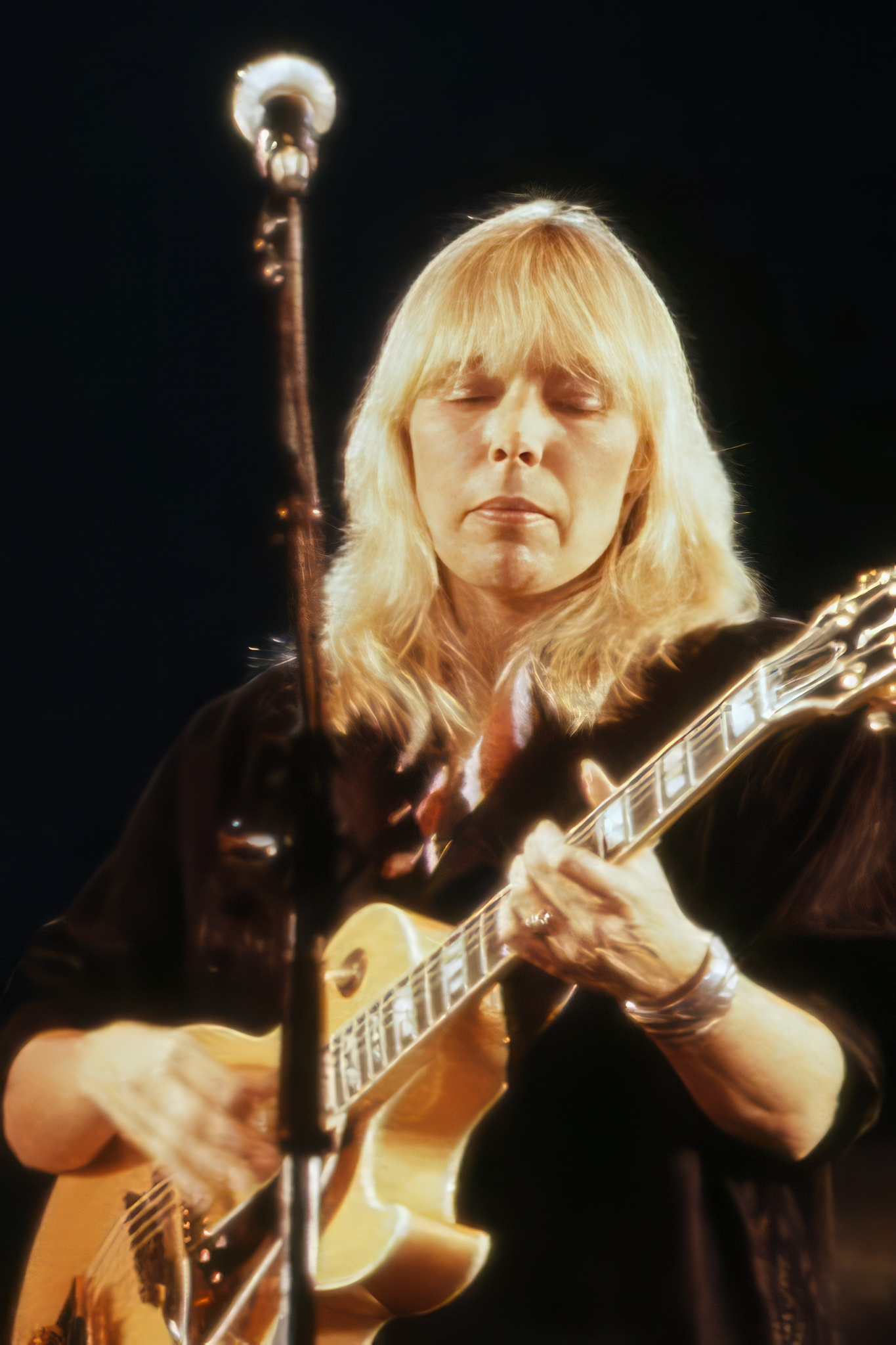
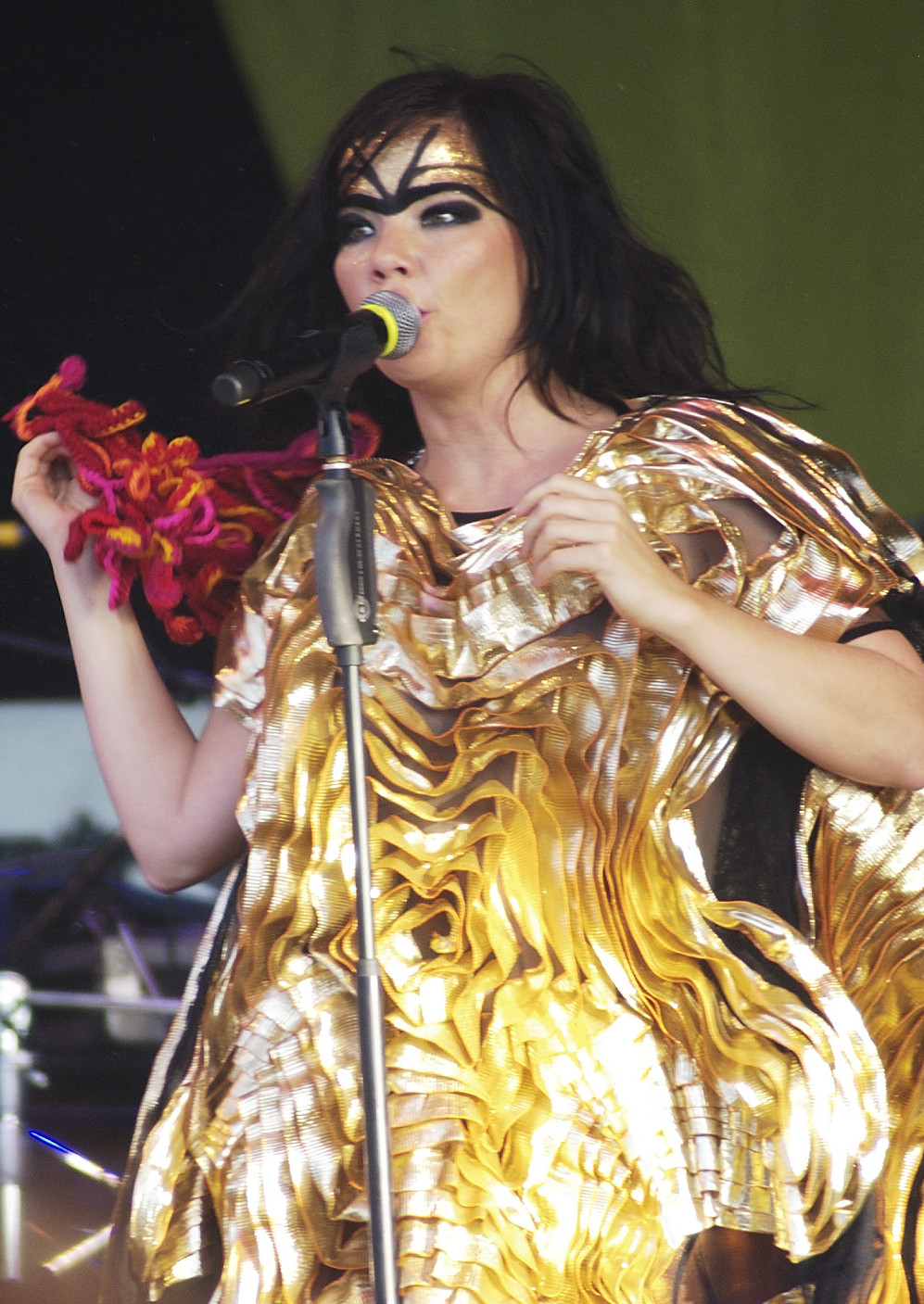
Goulding has listed musicians such as Joni Mitchell (left) and Björk (right) as her influences

Goulding described herself in 2011 as being "influenced by everyone" and stated that she listens to a wide range of music. She holds Joni Mitchell, Kate Bush, and Björk in particular esteem. Amongst her contemporaries, she has cited artists such as Lady Gaga, Katy Perry, Rihanna, Drake, Nicki Minaj, Kanye West, Beyoncé, Bon Iver, Burial, and Taylor Swift as inspirations. She has also expressed affinity for classical music.

=== Musical style ===
Goulding's music has been described as electropop, synth-pop, indie pop and folktronica. Her musical style has been compared to the likes of Kate Nash, Lykke Li and Tracey Thorn. Her debut studio album, Lights, experiments with genres including indie pop, synth-pop, folktronica and indietronica. It also contains "sparkling pop with a folky heart and an electronic edge" and was noted by Camilla Pia of The Fly as being infectious. According to The Independent's Andy Gill, the album incorporates "acoustic guitar" and "retro-synthpop" compared to that of Little Boots and La Roux, while the production contained "folkie origins under a welter of busily cycling synths and programmed beats". Her second studio album, Halcyon, followed in the same vein, including genres such as indie pop, synth-pop and dream pop. She stepped away from the electronic sound of her previous studio album and moved to a more tribal and anthemic sound containing a bit more piano and vocal. Its re-issue, Halcyon Days, which features ten new songs, marked Goulding's return to electropop. She spoke in an interview with Elle about the reason behind her return to a more electronic sound, stating: "I have such an affinity with electronic music that I can't step away from it."

Goulding's third studio album, Delirium, marked a shift to a more maximalist sound. Rooted in pop music, it incorporated genres such as electropop, synth-pop, dance, R&B, and folk-pop. It divided music critics and fans alike, with critics praising its production but finding that its lyrics lacked personality in comparison to her previous studio albums. Goulding's fourth studio album, Brightest Blue, is divided in two sides; the first side, which was described as recapturing the "simplicity" and "vulnerability" of her first two records, experiments with genres such as R&B, soul and electropop. Meanwhile, the second side EG.0 incorporates influences from music genres like hip-hop and dance. Higher Than Heaven, Goulding's fifth studio album, is primarily a dance-pop and nu-disco record with elements of synth-pop, R&B and electronic dance music (EDM).

=== Artistic identity ===
Goulding's artistic identity has been shaped by her transition from an indie-leaning singer-songwriter to a mainstream pop artist. Early in her career, critics characterized Goulding by her distinctive blend of folktronica, and her understated public persona that contrasted with conventional pop stardom. Her first two studio albums established an image centered on atmospheric production, emotional vulnerability, and an unconventional approach to electronic pop, which distinguished her from many contemporary mainstream artists. In 2015, the commercial success of "Love Me like You Do", together with the release of Delirium later that year, expanded Goulding's global audience and reinforced her position within mainstream pop, prompting critics to reassess her artistic direction and debate the extent to which her transition toward contemporary pop affected the qualities that had defined her earlier work. (Note: Multiple references:) Reviews published by Pitchfork and The Guardian contrasted the idiosyncratic qualities of her early work with the streamlined production and contemporary pop aesthetics of her later releases. Reviewing Delirium, Alexis Petridis for The Guardian observed that Goulding had moved away from the "folk-tinged, wispy-voiced lilt" of her earlier recordings and argued that, although the album successfully embraced contemporary pop, "some of what made her unique has been ironed out". Hazel Cills for Pitchfork, by contrast, described Delirium as a confident move toward club-oriented synth-pop, contrasting its polished sound with the darker, more orchestral style of Halcyon while concluding that the album represented an extension of Goulding's evolving songwriting rather than a complete departure from her earlier work. In her review of Brightest Blue, Hannah Jocelyn for Pitchfork described Goulding as "a folktronica artist who pivoted to mainstream pop", arguing that the formulaic production of Delirium often failed to capitalize on her distinctive vocal style before characterizing Brightest Blue as a partial return to the introspective qualities of her earlier work.

=== Voice ===
Goulding is a soprano and is noted for her high piercing vibrato. In a review for Halcyon, Neil McCormick of The Daily Telegraph described her voice as "something special", continuing: "Her tremulous vibrato and slightly hoarse timbre have the feel of something primal and folky, her birdlike high notes conveying a childlike wonder while darker tones imply ancient depths of sorrow. She sings like she is strung out on the melody, warbling from a place of desperate emotion. It really is that rarest and perhaps most accidental of gifts: an original voice". He then continued in regards to her vocal layering, stating, "producer Jim Eliot puts her voice front, back and centre, banking up choral walls of vibrato, fashioning hooks from cut up samples of chirrups and chants, and creating unusual textures from trills and warbles". During an interview with Carson Daly, Goulding described her own voice saying;

I think sometimes it sounds like my voice is like, out of control... I have to really control it because it just kind of goes everywhere. Like, sometimes stuff comes out that I don't expect. A lot, actually [...]. It's so funny because my favourite thing to do is imitate opera singers, but I've never had a singing lesson. Oh, I had a lesson just to teach me how to breathe better, but I never really had a singing lesson.

Will Hermes of Rolling Stone compared her voice to that of Dolly Parton, stating that her upper register was dazzling whilst also complimenting her skill in vocal multi-layering. Megan Farokhmanesh of Paste magazine stated, "Goulding has a lovely voice, but occasionally her soprano-strung vocals hit a note that rubs the eardrums the wrong way", although she praised Goulding overall for her "talent for gorgeous high heart-tugging vocals".

During the 2020s, critics became more appreciative of Goulding's voice, with many noticing its enduring quality and describing her vocals as ethereal. In her review of Higher Than Heaven, Katie Bain from Billboard called her "one of dance music's most important and enduring voices". Similarly, Jordi Bardají of Jenesaispop, in his review of "Hypnotized", said that Goulding's ethereal voice fits in EDM productions like a glove.

=== Impact ===
Goulding has received praise and admiration from fellow peers. Some artists that have spoken highly about the singer include Halsey, Bridgit Mendler, Lauv, Becky Hill, Camila Cabello, Normani, Lil Nas X, Alex James of Blur, Chappell Roan, St. Lucia, Nina Nesbitt, Ally Brooke, Bunt, Taylor Swift, Aaron Paul, Greyson Chance, Sadie Jean, DJ Fresh, Olivia Lunny, Rhea Raj, Illenium, Bright Light Bright Light, Calvin Harris, Selena Gomez, and Lorde.

Halsey expressed admiration for Goulding, calling her "an absolute trailblazer in this [music] industry", and acknowledged her as one of the artists she "looked up to" early in her career before introducing her as a special guest on her Back to Badlands Tour. James praised Goulding's authenticity: "Love her songs. She's the real deal in a world of bogus pop pretenders." He also included Halcyon Days in Blur's favourites albums of all-time on iTunes. Harris, a frequent collaborator of Goulding, spoke in an interview with Dork about working with Goulding: "Ellie has the three good things about working with somebody. A spectacular unique voice and delivery that can carry a song emotionally, and [she's] a laugh!". Lorde stated in an interview with Clash that she would "love to write for – or with – Ellie Goulding, actually." Swift praised Goulding's voice while talking with Capital FM, saying: "Ellie is amazing, and when she starts singing – I remember the affect she had on my band – they were all looking at each other like 'That's really what her voice sounds like'," she explained. "Because when you first hear an Ellie Goulding song, you're like 'Oh I wonder what effect they're using on her voice. No, that's just the way it sounds." Roan mentioned Goulding in an interview with PopCrave as one of the inspirations that influenced her early music. Gomez cited Goulding as an influence for the making of her album Stars Dance in an interview with Teen Vogue, saying: "I got to record 20 or so great songs and work with a bunch of different producers and they're all really fun, pop songs and a little Ellie Goulding-ish."

== Personal life ==
=== Relationships and children ===
Goulding dated the British radio DJ, television presenter and author Greg James in 2010. Their relationship ended in 2012 after 18 months together. In the same year, after collaborating on a song called "Bittersweet" for The Twilight Saga: Breaking Dawn – Part 2 soundtrack, Goulding started dating the American DJ Skrillex. The two split nine months later due to the long-distance nature of their relationship. Goulding later was in a relationship with the actor Jeremy Irvine. They broke up in August 2013. Goulding was in a relationship with Dougie Poynter of the pop rock band McFly between 2014 and 2016.

On 7 August 2018, Goulding and her boyfriend Caspar Jopling announced their engagement. The couple were married at York Minster on 31 August 2019, and Goulding was baptised in the Church of England in order to get married. Jopling is the grandson of former Conservative MP Michael Jopling. In February 2021, Goulding announced that she and Jopling were expecting their first child. She gave birth to a son in April 2021. In February 2024, Goulding and Jopling announced their separation. Following the separation, she began dating the American actor Beau Minniear, who appeared in the music video for "Destiny" (2025). In December 2025, she revealed that she was expecting her second child and first with Minniear. Goulding gave birth to their daughter in March 2026.

Goulding's best friend and personal assistant is Hannah Lowe; the 2015 song "Army" was dedicated to Lowe. On Michael McIntyre's Big Show, she revealed that she is also close friends with Princess Beatrice.

=== Health ===
Goulding ran the inaugural Nike Women Half Marathon in Washington, D.C. on 28 April 2013, earning a time of 1:41:35. She has spoken several times about her ongoing experiences with mental health conditions, which includes struggles with a chronic anxiety disorder, panic attacks, imposter syndrome, and post-natal depression.

I get such chronic anxiety that in the rare moments I don't have anxiety, I feel so happy and full of joy that I'm not having it. If I am in an anxious state, I don't feel things. I numb myself to everything.

— Ellie Goulding, to Stellar

In 2016, she spoke to Flare about suffering panic attacks caused by the studio environment that prevented her from working, and going to cognitive behavioural therapy (CBT) sessions for the first time. In 2017, she discussed in an interview with Well+Good, her ongoing confidence issues and severe anxiety she had experienced. In 2019, a week after the World Mental Health Day, Goulding used her Instagram account to bring awareness on dealing with imposter syndrome, sharing her own experience with it and the consequences it had in her life and career. She also stated that her grandfather died by suicide "a few years ago". In December 2023, whilst guest editing the Today programme, she said that she had suffered from post-natal depression following the birth of her son in 2021. Goulding credits her approach to the natural environment, having a fitness regime, and kickboxing as ways that helped her overcome panic attacks and anxiety. Goulding also formerly followed a plant-based diet.

== Public image ==
Goulding's personal life has been highly subject to intense media scrutiny. She has been a victim of numerous false rumours spread by British tabloids, which has affected her public image and her mental health. (Note: Multiple references:) Goulding stated that the media coverage of her life felt like "being strapped to a space shuttle".

After the release of the song "Don't" by the English singer-songwriter Ed Sheeran in 2014, Goulding was rumoured to be the subject of the lyrics, which Goulding denied multiple times, clarifying that she has never dated Sheeran. The media coverage and the subsequent slut-shaming received over the false claims led Goulding to step out from the spotlight for five years. She has expressed her disappointment and frustration with the unfounded allegations, stating: "I was made to feel like a terrible person and I really struggled with that because I know I'm not."

In 2024, Goulding released a statement on her Instagram Stories condemning the false narratives surrounding the end of her marriage, criticising the tabloids for violating her privacy, which has damaged her mental health. She denounced the several unethical practices that the media has played to get unwarranted information on her, including paying locals from Costa Rica to snitch on her. Goulding also opened up about becoming a "paranoid wreck" after being constantly stalked "over, and over" by an older man, as well having to deal with a male paparazzi with "a long lens camera wrapped on a towel". She concluded her statement saying that she "never asked for this level of intrusion".

During the 2020s, Goulding became a victim of trolling on the internet, mainly after a parody account, Fake Showbiz News. They used Goulding as a vessel for fake quotes on X, which quickly become a viral trend on the internet with several users creating their own fake quotes of Goulding. Goulding has acknowledged the trend and played along with it.

== Philanthropy ==
Goulding has dedicated herself to using her platform to advocate for a range of social issues, including environmental protection, gender equality, mental health awareness, support for the homeless, the victims of sexual harassment in the music industry, and LGBTQ+ rights.

=== Social issues ===
In 2010, Goulding participated in the Bupa Great North Run for the British Heart Foundation (BHF). In 2011, Goulding ran the She Runs LA event for the charity Students Run LA, which aims to increase access to sport for less privileged children across the Los Angeles Unified School District.

In 2012, she partnered with the internet radio Pandora. One dollar for each sale of her mixtape was donated to the Free the Children charity. On 1 June 2013, Goulding performed at Gucci's global concert event in London, whose campaign "Chime for Change" aims to raise awareness of women's issues in terms of education, health and justice.

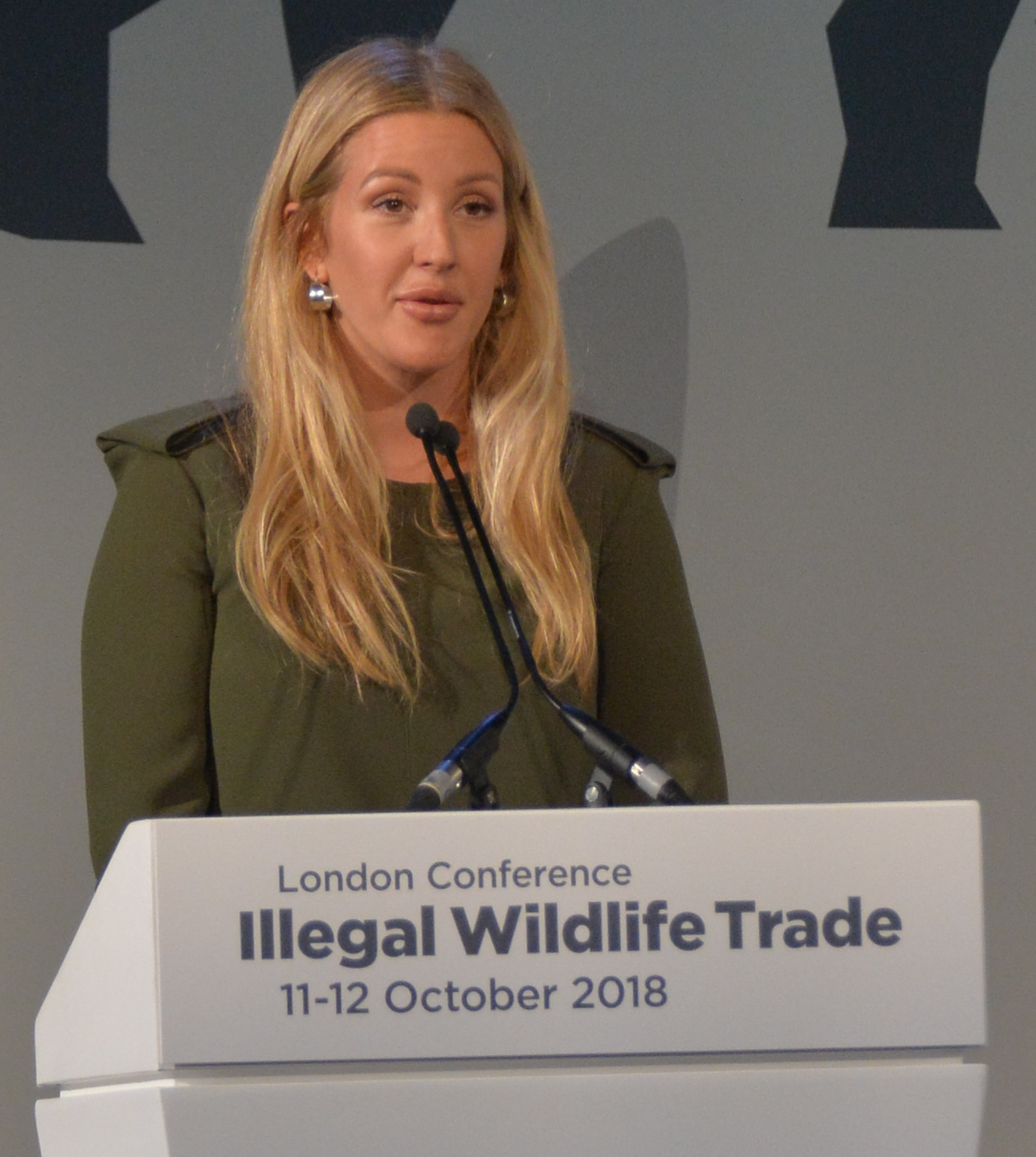
Goulding speaking in her role as United Nations (UN) Environment Goodwill Ambassador in London, 2018

Goulding is also a supporter for helping the homeless. Goulding has frequently contributed to the BBC's annual charity telethon Children in Need in the UK. In 2013, Goulding's track "How Long Will I Love You" was the official single for the Children in Need 2013 campaign. She has performed in the annual charity concerts for the "Streets of London" charity event at the Royal Albert Hall in London from years 2014 to 2018 consecutively. On 24 December 2015, Goulding volunteered in central London at the Marylebone Project to help end homelessness and to assist in the elimination of the stereotype associated with the homeless population. She said, "It's that stigma of what a homeless person is — they abuse drugs or abuse alcohol. It's just not true, some people come from very normal backgrounds, very normal situations and something goes wrong. It can happen to all of us." As a patron of the Marylebone Project, Goulding attended the opening of a 24-hour drop-in centre for homeless women in London in November 2021.

=== Environment ===
On 15 November 2014, Goulding joined the charity supergroup Band Aid 30 along with other British and Irish pop acts, recording a new version of the track "Do They Know It's Christmas?" at Sarm West Studios in Notting Hill, London, to raise money for the Western African Ebola epidemic. In 2016, Goulding used her platform to champion environmental causes, which includes working with organisations like the World Wildlife Fund (WWF). During the 2016 Earth Hour event, Goulding urged people to share the hashtag #MakeClimateMatter on social medias, with the purpose of show governments, that the public's support for strong climate action.

In 2018, Goulding joined the United Nations Foundation as a Global Ambassador. In April 2019, Goulding and the American musician Steve Price created an original song titled "In This Together" for David Attenborough's environmental documentary series Our Planet. In October 2019, Goulding was one of the 2,000 activists from 190 countries who spoke at the One Young World global forum, which addressed urgent global issues such as climate change, among others. In 2022, Goulding called out the then-Prime Minister Liz Truss on Twitter, urging her to take a serious stance on the climate crisis. In 2023, Goulding decided that her next album would feature eco-friendly packaging. Her fifth studio album, Higher Than Heaven, saw multiple delays due to difficulties sourcing sustainable materials for the album's physical formats, but eventually was released.

After seven years, Goulding stepped down from her role as a Global Goodwill Ambassador for the United Nations Environment Programme in 2024.

=== LGBTQ+ community ===
"I believe it's the minimum of human decency to allow people to be their true selves to love who they love and to do whatever the fuck they want without harm, without danger, and without oppression." [...] "Now more than ever, us allies need to step up – and we will, I promise – up to the plate and shout louder than ever before to protect – and I promise we will – to protect, support, and show the ultimate love to our fellow human beings, and I promise I will do that."

— Ellie Goulding, during her acceptance speech at Attitude

Goulding has a strong following within the LGBTQ+ community, and has consistently demonstrated allyship through public advocacy for their rights. In 2014, Goulding was invited to perform at the opening ceremony of the Sochi Winter Olympics but declined, following the American singer and actress Cher's decision to boycott the event in protest of the President Vladimir Putin's anti-LGBTQ+ legislation in Russia, stating: "I immediately said no." about the offer. In June 2016, during her Delirium World Tour performance in North Carolina, Goulding displayed a pride flag as a form of protest against the state's 'bathroom bill' (HB2), which restricted the rights of LGBTQ+ individuals.

In November 2019, Goulding was set to perform at the Dallas Cowboys' halftime show, launching the Salvation Army's annual Christmas Kettle campaign. After sharing photos of herself volunteering, fans raised concerns about the organisation's history of anti-LGBTQ+ policies. In response, Goulding threatened to withdraw unless the Salvation Army made a clear commitment or donation to the LGBTQ+ community, saying: "Upon researching this, I have reached out to The Salvation Army and said that I would have no choice but to pull out unless they very quickly make a solid, committed pledge or donation to the LGBTQ community." The Salvation Army responded reaffirming their commitment to serving all individuals regardless of sexual orientation or gender identity and clarifying that their services are provided based solely on need. Following this exchange, Goulding agreed to proceed with the performance. The backlash renewed attention to longstanding criticism of the Salvation Army's stance on LGBTQ+ inclusivity.

In 2022, at the Virgin Atlantic Attitude Awards, Goulding urged fellow allies to 'step up' and use their platforms to support, and protect the LGBTQ community, placing particular emphasis on transgender individuals in light of the "exhausting" rising number of targeted attacks and growing hostility toward the trans community.

In May 2025, Goulding was among the artists who signed an open letter pledging "solidarity with the trans, non-binary and intersex communities" and condemning the April 2025 Supreme Court ruling on the definition of woman in the Equality Act and subsequent Equality and Human Rights Commission (EHRC) guidance.

== Other ventures ==
=== Served cocktails ===
Goulding acquired a significant stake in the premium British hard seltzer brand, Served, for an undisclosed sum in June 2021. In July 2022, the Advertising Standards Authority (ASA) banned a series of Facebook posts from Goulding promoting Served hard seltzer. Goulding's posts claimed that the drink was low in calories and contained no sugar, which the ASA ruled were not permitted nutritional claims for alcohol products.

In January 2023, Served announced that it had entered into a partnership with Morrisons as part of the supermarket's Growing British Brands accelerator programme, which aimed at promoting "innovative and sustainable British producers". Later that year, Served launched a series of ready to drink cocktails, including mojito, passion fruit martini, and piña colada flavours. In September, Goulding announced that Heineken UK had acquired a significant minority stake in Served.

=== Nike ===
In 2010, Goulding began a multi-year partnership with Nike, focusing on global brand campaigns, custom workout programs, and music curated for athletes. Their first collaboration, an extended play titled Run into the Light, was released in August 2010. Goulding also appeared in several advertisements for the company, including a short documentary. In 2013, Goulding collaborated with Nike on a limited-edition version of the FlyKnit Lunar1+ running shoes inspired by her second studio album, Halcyon. She also released a remix album of Halcyon through Nike Sport Music to promote the inaugural Nike Women Half Marathon.

In 2015 and 2016, Goulding designed a new workout routine for the Nike+ Training Club app. During this period, she was named Nike's global ambassador for the "A Melody of Movement" campaign and appeared as the face of the company. Before her hiatus in 2017, Goulding participated in the promotional campaign for the Air Max Thea FlyKnit which was made public in January 2017.

=== MAC Cosmetics ===
In 2015, Goulding and MAC Cosmetics announced their first collaboration, launching a set of make-up which are described on MAC's press release as an inspiration of Goulding's "light and dichotomy so present in her artwork and as a performer". The set of products were made available in January 2016, and each cosmetics was named after a song from Goulding's discography. As of May 2017, Goulding's collection is included among the best-selling MAC collaborations of all time, placing at No. 16.

=== Everystate supplements ===
In 2025, Goulding partnered with wellness executive Gemma Feare, and nutrition entrepreneur Jonathan Relph, launching Everystate (stylised as every•state), a wellness company which develops mushroom supplements. According to press release, the supplements will help to relax, have mental health clarity, and better skin.

=== Endorsements ===
Goulding contributed her vocals to an advert for the British department store chain John Lewis & Partners in 2010. The John Lewis Christmas advert has become an annual tradition in British culture and one of the signals that the countdown to Christmas has begun in the UK, with Goulding performing "Your Song" for the store's 2010 campaign. In 2013, Goulding was announced as one of several new models for Marks & Spencer's 'Womanism' campaign. Subtitled "Britain's leading ladies", the campaign saw Goulding appear alongside British women from various fields, including the actress Helen Mirren, double Olympic gold medal-winning boxer Nicola Adams, and the writer Monica Ali.

Goulding is endorsing the Swiss shampoo Pantene Pro-V on television and on the official Pantene website under the tagline "Strong Is Beautiful". The campaign has been running since 21 March 2016. Goulding starred and performed "What the World Needs Now" on a new advert for People's Postcode Lottery 2024 campaign, which thanks its players for helping to raise money for many charities in the UK.

== Accolades and achievements ==
=== As an artist ===
Goulding has won several awards during her music career. She has also been nominated for numerous major music awards. She was honoured with the Variety Hitmakers Decade Award in 2019, after ten years of consistent work as a hitmaker, with Goulding stating: "It's probably the first time I've really been acknowledged for this work". In the same year, Goulding was awarded with an honorary Doctor of Arts degree at the University of Kent in recognition of her contribution to music. Meanwhile, in recognition as a songwriter she was presented with the BMI President's Award at the 2022 BMI London Awards ceremony. Goulding was awarded with the Praeses Elit Award from Trinity College Dublin, given to those who have left an impact in their respective fields, in 2023.

Throughout her music career, Goulding has attached several records to her name. In 2015, Goulding became the first artist to replace herself from the top spot on the Dance/Mix Show Airplay chart, when "Love Me like You Do" dethroned "Outside". Goulding's "Love Me like You Do" also broke the record for the most-streamed track in a week on Spotify, surpassing Mark Ronson and Bruno Mars' "Uptown Funk". In 2019, Goulding set the record for most song entries by a British female artist in the US after "Hate Me" became her fourteen entry on the Billboard Hot 100. Billboard ranked her as one of the most successful artists of the 2010s decade. Billboard also ranked Goulding as the 62nd biggest female artist of the 21st century in March 2025. In the United Kingdom, Goulding has the most number-one albums by a British female artist (tied with Adele), with four of her five studio albums (Lights, Halcyon, Brightest Blue and Higher Than Heaven) topping the chart. Goulding's cover version of "River" was the final number-one single of the 2010s in the United Kingdom. Goulding ranks as the third British female artist with most number-one singles with four chart-topping singles: "Burn" (2013), "Love Me like You Do" (2014), "River" (2019) and "Miracle" (2023), just behind Jess Glynne and Cheryl. Goulding currently holds the record for most song entries by a British female solo artist on the UK singles chart with 36 song entries, surpassing the Welsh singer Shirley Bassey in 2023.

She has sold more than 44 million albums and 442 million singles and amassed 55 billion streams worldwide, making her one of the most successful British female singers of the 21st century.

=== As an activist ===
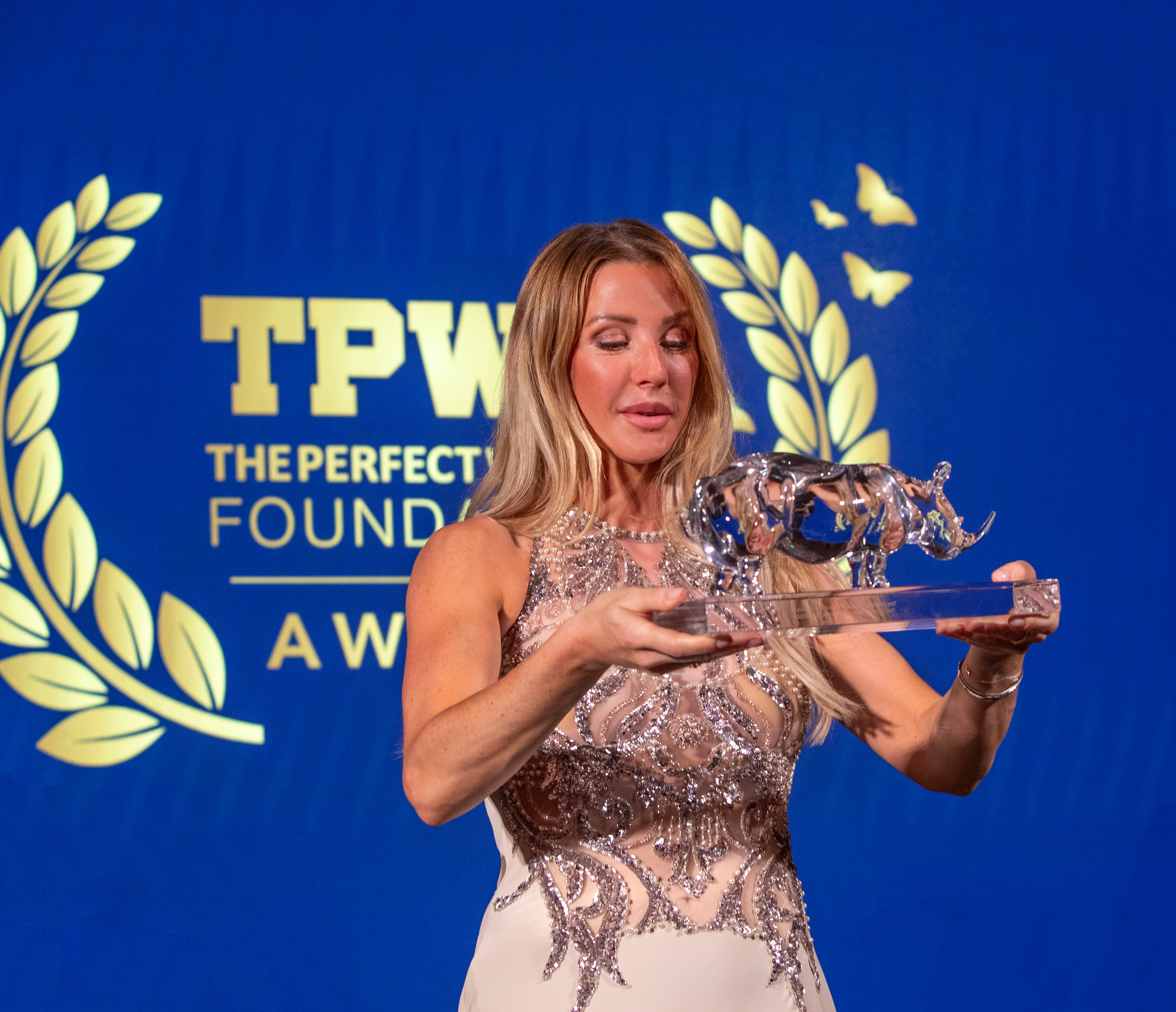
Goulding holding the Fragile Rhino trophy as "The Conservationist of 2024" by The Perfect World Foundation Awards

For her support to the LGBTQ community, Goulding has been honoured with the Ally Award (2022) by the Attitude Awards, the Celebrity Ally (2019) by the British LGBT Awards, and a nomination in the same category at the 2022 ceremony.

For her constant activism on climate change awareness, Goulding has received numerous recognitions, some of her honours include being awarded with the Global Leadership Award (2017) for her environmental and social justice activism. She was also named Humanitarian of the Year (2022) for her work, raising the profile of fossil fuel-funded conflicts including in Ukraine and her support for refugees from conflict zones and the frontline of the climate crisis; both awards were given by the United Nations Foundation. Goulding was honoured at the Time100 Impact Awards with the Impact Award in recognition of her longstanding work toward advancing climate change awareness, in 2022. In 2024, Goulding was presented as the eleventh recipient of the Perfect World Foundation Award, becoming the first musician to be recognised with the Conservationist of the Year title, by the environmental organisation. She was also awarded with the Impact Award by the Playing for Change Foundation for her work as an artist and philanthropist, that same year. In 2025, Goulding was appointed by King Charles III as a Member of the Order of the British Empire (MBE) in the 2026 New Year Honours list, for her services to biodiversity and the climate. (Note: Multiple references:)

== Discography ==
Studio albums

- Lights (2010)
- Halcyon (2012)
- Delirium (2015)
- Brightest Blue (2020)
- Higher Than Heaven (2023)
- I Know Too Much (2026)

== Concert tours ==
=== Headlining ===
- The Lights Tour (2010)
- The Halcyon Days Tour (2012–2014)
- Delirium World Tour (2016–2017)
- Brightest Blue Tour (2021)
- Higher Than Heaven Tour (2023)

=== Supporting ===
- Katy Perry – California Dreams Tour (2011)
- Bruno Mars – The Moonshine Jungle Tour (2013)
- Opening Ceremony of Expo 2020 (2021)
- Opening Ceremony of Top of the Mountain (2024)

== Filmography ==
List of filmography
Year	Title	Role	Notes
Television
2011	Saturday Night Live	Herself	Musical Guest; Tina Fey/Ellie Goulding (season 36)
2012	Late Night with Jimmy Fallon	Herself	Musical Guest
2012	Conan	Herself	Musical Guest; Season 2; Episode 153
2013	Who Is...?	Herself	Featured artist
2013	The Sound Change Live	Herself	Guest
2014	The Royal Variety Show	Herself	Performer
2015	The Voice	Herself	Advisor for Team Adam Levine (season 8)
2015	Victoria's Secret Fashion Show	Herself	Performer
2018	Sesame Street	Herself	Episode: "The Helpful Cloud"
2020	One World: Together at Home	Herself	Special
2022	The Great Celebrity Bake Off for SU2C	Herself	Series 5; Episode 5
2022	The Royal Variety Show	Herself	Performer
2022	The Earthshot Prize	Herself	Performer
2022	American Music Awards	Herself	Presenter
2023	American Idol	Herself	Special guest; Season 21; Episode 20
2023	The Jennifer Hudson Show	Herself	Season 2; Episode 209
2024	Dick Clark's New Year's Rockin' Eve	Herself	Performer
2024	The Masked Singer UK	Herself	Guest panellist; Episode 5
2025	Love Thy Nader	Herself	Guest star; Episode 6: "Sex, Swimwear and Salmon Sperm"
2026	Later... with Jools Holland	Herself	Musical Guest
Films
2013	Tom & Issy	Issy	Short film
2014	Ellie Goulding: Healthy Eating on Tour	Herself	Documentary short
2014	Lennon or McCartney	Herself	Documentary short
2015	American Express Unstaged: Ellie Goulding	Herself	Concert film; directed by Scarlett Johansson
2017	Louder Together	Herself	Documentary
2023	Monumental: Ellie Goulding at Kew Gardens	Herself	Concert film
2026	Bee Wild	Herself	Documentary; Narrator; Composer
Audio
2020	Talk Art	Herself	Ellie Goulding and Caspar Jopling (QuarARTine special episode)
2022	Crush Hour: A Musical	Ash	Podcast Series; 5 Episodes
† Denotes works that have not yet been released.

== Written works ==
=== Books ===
- Fitter. Calmer. Stronger. (2021)

=== Authored articles ===
- Goulding, Elena (2 December 2020). "The start of a conversation". Medium.
- Goulding, Ellie (25 April 2022). "Introducing Marie Claire UK's Guest Editor: Ellie Goulding". Marie Claire.
- Goulding, Ellie (25 April 2022). "Motherhood changes everything". Marie Claire.
- Goulding, Ellie (25 April 2022). "These are the women who shaped me". Marie Claire.
- Goulding, Ellie (24 October 2023). "My journey to the Amazon confirmed we have every reason to worry". The Independent.
- Goulding, Ellie (15 December 2023). "I Attended COP28 – And There's Still Hope". Marie Claire.
- Goulding, Ellie (31 October 2024). "Depletion of nature is shocking — we have to take action now". The Times.
- Goulding, Ellie (2 October 2025). "There's 'No Prosperity on a Dead Planet'". Rolling Stone.

== In popular culture ==
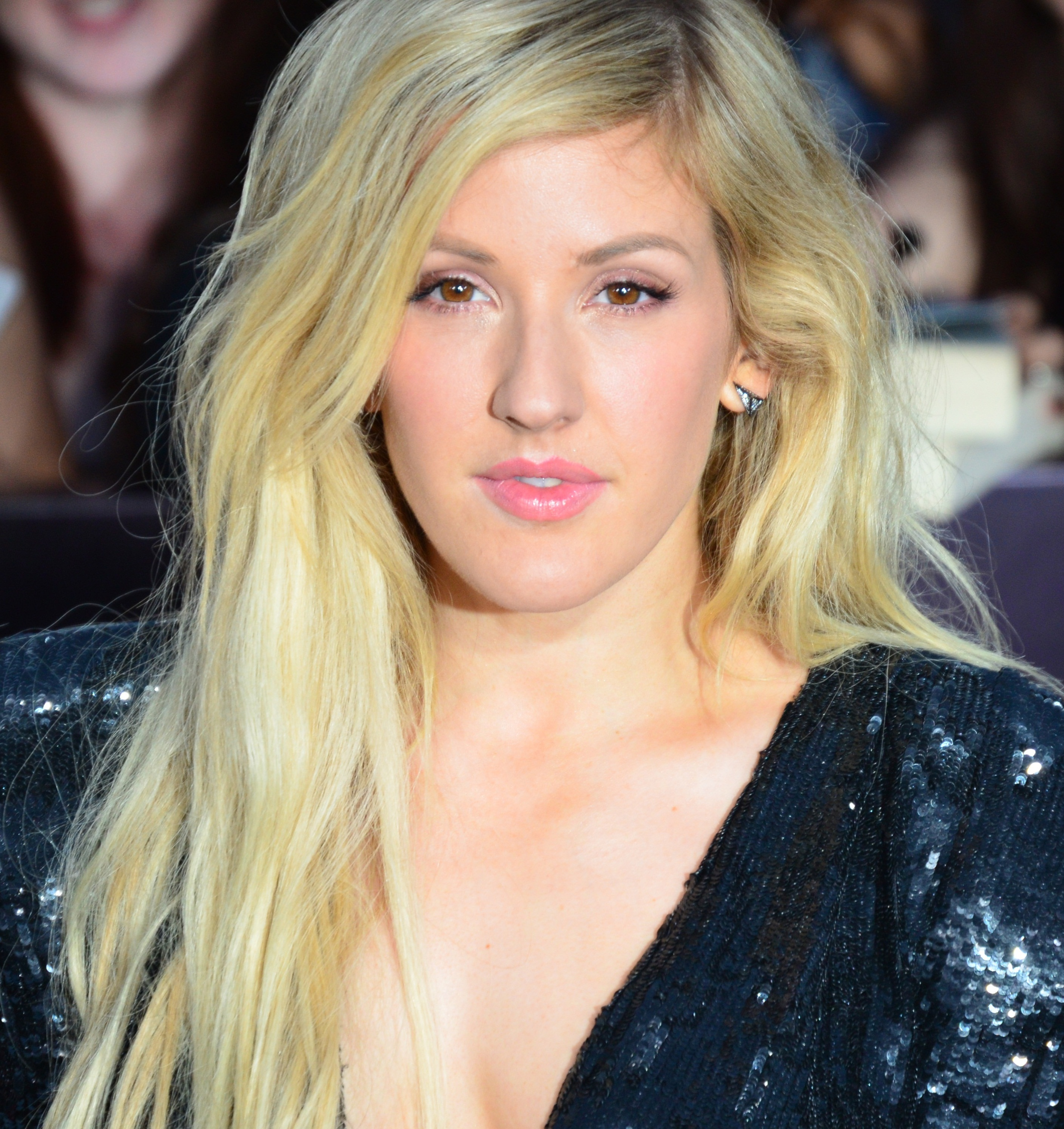
Goulding at the film premiere of "Divergent", 2014

Goulding's music contributions on visual media has been highlighted by both music and film critics. Her best-known collaborations include her song "Love Me like You Do" for Fifty Shades of Grey, "Bittersweet" for The Twilight Saga: Breaking Dawn – Part 2, "Mirror" for The Hunger Games: Catching Fire, "Still Falling for You" for Bridget Jones's Baby, "Do You Remember" for Fighting with My Family; "How Long Will I Love You" for About Time, and the Divergent soundtrack, including "Beating Heart". For television, Goulding has recorded original songs for the HBO series Girls and Game of Thrones, and collaborated with Steve Price for the Netflix original series Our Planet. For musicals, Goulding recorded a cover version for the Broadway musical album Finding Neverland, and three original songs for the Amazon podcast series Crush Hour: A Musical.

During the 2010s, Goulding's music was heavily used in films and television series, including The Killing of a Sacred Deer, Spring Breakers, The Host, Now Is Good, Marvel's Cloak & Dagger, Teen Spirit, Cinderella, Glee, Arrow, Teen Wolf, Gossip Girl, Supergirl, and New Girl. Goulding performed the theme song for American television network The CW. Actresses Elle Fanning covered "Lights" for the film Teen Spirit, Melissa Benoist covered "Anything Could Happen" for the fourteenth episode of the fourth season of Glee, and Raffey Cassidy performed "Burn" for the film The Killing of a Sacred Deer.

According to Billboard, Goulding's music has been sampled numerous times in hip-hop music. Among the most notable samples are Drake and Jay-Z's "Pound Cake / Paris Morton Music 2" (2013), which samples Goulding's track "Don't Say a Word" (2012); Big Sean, Wiz Khalifa and Chiddy Bang's "High" (2011), which samples "Fighter Plane" (2009); Vic Mensa and Skrillex's "No Chill" (2016), which samples "Explosions" (2012); French Montana's "I Know" (2020), which samples "Starry Eyed" (2010); Lil Baby's "In a Minute" (2022), which sampled "Don't Say a Word" (2012); Fivio Foreign's "World Watching" (2022), which sampled "Lights" (2011); Future and Metro Boomin's "Mile High Memories" (2023), which samples "Hanging On" (2012); and most recently Fuerza Regida's "Tu Sancho" (2025), which samples "Don't Say a Word" (2012).

=== Portrayals in fiction ===
- In 2016, Goulding was portrayed by the actress Lizzy Connolly in Channel 4's parody series of the British royal family, The Windsors.
- In 2024, the English comedian and actress Lucia Keskin portrayed a fictionalised version of Goulding on the first-season finale of the BBC Three television sitcom Things You Should Have Done.
