= Hugel (DJ) =

French DJ and music producer (born 1987)

- Born: Florent Hugel; 4 December 1987 (age 38); Marseille, Provence-Alpes-Côte d'Azur, France
- Genres: House; Latin house; deep house
- Occupations: Musician, record producer, DJ, remixer
- Years active: 2005–present
- Labels: Warner; Universal
- Website: hugelmusic.com

Florent Hugel (French: [flɔʁɑ̃ yʒɛl]; born 4 December 1987), known mononymously as Hugel (stylized in all caps), is a French DJ, record producer, and remixer. He first rose to international fame for his remix of "Bella Ciao", which became a viral hit in 2018, and his original track "Morenita", which helped popularize the Latin house genre. Hugel has collaborated with and remixed tracks for numerous high-profile artists, including David Guetta, Robin Schulz, and J Balvin. Hugel is best known for his 2024 hit single "I Adore You".

== Career ==
Hugel began his career as a DJ at the age of 16 in his hometown of Marseille, France. Inspired by artists such as Daft Punk, Carl Cox, and Laurent Garnier, he quickly developed a passion for electronic dance music. In 2017, Hugel gained significant attention with his collaboration with Robin Schulz on the gold-certified track "I Believe I'm Fine".

His breakthrough came in 2018 with his remix of El Profesor's "Bella Ciao", which became the official German summer hit of that year and achieved platinum status in Germany, Austria, and Switzerland. The remix has amassed over 280 million streams worldwide.

Hugel has since become a prominent figure in the electronic dance music scene, performing at major festivals such as Tomorrowland, EDC Las Vegas, and Lollapalooza. He has also held residencies at renowned clubs in Ibiza, including Ushuaia and Pacha.

In 2021, Hugel released "Morenita", which further solidified his position in the industry. In 2024, he released "I Adore You", which is a collaboration with German DJ Topic, Iranian-Swedish singer Arash and British musician Daecolm. The song quickly became a commercial success worldwide, and is Hugel's most successful hit single to date.

== Discography ==
=== Albums ===
List of albums, with selected details and chart positions
Title	Details	Peak chart positions						
Title	Details	BEL (WA)	GER	ITA	LTU	NLD	NOR	SWI
Twenty One	Released: 26 June 2026; Label: Make the Girls Dance; Formats: Digital download, streaming	141	73	13	52	32	69	23

=== Singles ===
List of singles as lead artist, with selected chart positions, sales and certifications, showing year released and album name
Title	Year	Peak chart positions								Sales	Album
Title	Year	FRA	AUS	AUT	CAN	GER	SWI	UK	WW	Sales	Album
"Coming Home" (featuring Jimmy Hennessy)	2015	—	—	—	—	—	—	—	—		Non-album singles
"Where We Belong" (with Jasmine Thompson)	2016	—	—	—	—	—	—	—	—		Non-album singles
"Baby"	2017	—	—	—	—	—	—	—	—		Non-album singles
"I Believe I'm Fine" (with Robin Schulz)	2017	182	—	26	—	—	88	—	—	BVMI: Gold	Uncovered
"Signs" (with Taio Cruz)	2018	—	—	—	—	—	—	—	—		Non-album singles
"WTF" (featuring Amber Van Day)	2018	—	—	26	—	—	96	—	—		Non-album singles
"Mamma Mia" (featuring Amber Van Day)	2019	—	—	—	—	—	—	—	—		Non-album singles
"House Music"	2019	—	—	—	—	—	—	—	—		Non-album singles
"Guajira Guantanamera"	2019	—	—	—	—	—	—	—	—		Non-album singles
"I Don't Wanna Talk" (with Alok featuring Amber Van Day)	2019	—	—	—	—	—	—	—	—		Non-album singles
"They Know"	2019	—	—	—	—	—	—	—	—		Non-album singles
"Better"	2020	—	—	—	—	—	—	—	—		Non-album singles
"Gym Quarantine"	2020	—	—	—	—	—	—	—	—		Non-album singles
"Cool"	2020	—	—	—	—	—	—	—	—		Non-album singles
"Magnify" (with Sleepwalkrs featuring LPW)	2020	—	—	—	—	—	—	—	—		Non-album singles
"I Wanna Kiss"	2020	—	—	—	—	—	—	—	—		Non-album singles
"Gimme Dat" (with MOLOW featuring S.E.N)	2020	—	—	—	—	—	—	—	—		Non-album singles
"Can't Love Myself" (featuring Mishaal and LPW)	2020	—	—	—	—	—	—	—	—		Back to Life
"4 to the Floor" (with Hugo Cantarra and Stefy De Cicco featuring Nikol Apatini)	2021	—	—	—	—	—	—	—	—		Non-album singles
"Come Get Me" (with Dawty featuring Preston Harris)	2021	—	—	—	—	—	—	—	—		Non-album singles
"My Bed" (with Love Harder and Tobtok featuring RBVLN)	2021	—	—	—	—	—	—	—	—		Non-album singles
"Mine" (featuring Dawty, Preston Harris and Sophia Sugarman)	2021	—	—	—	—	—	—	—	—		Non-album singles
"VIP" (featuring BLOODLINE)	2021	—	—	—	—	—	—	—	—		Back to Life
"Morenita" (with Cumbiafrica)	2021	—	—	—	—	—	—	—	—		Non-album singles
"Finally" (with Yves V)	2021	—	—	—	—	—	—	—	—		Non-album singles
"Back to Life"	2021	—	—	—	—	—	—	—	—		Back to Life
"Booty Call" (with Fast Eddie)	2021	—	—	—	—	—	—	—	—		Non-album singles
"Eyes on You" (with Quarterhead)	2021	—	—	—	—	—	—	—	—		Non-album singles
"La candela viva" (with Jude & Frank and Twolate)	2022	—	—	—	—	—	—	—	—		Non-album singles
"Castle" (with Alle Farben featuring Fast Boy)	2022	—	—	—	—	—	—	—	—		Non-album singles
"El Sueno" (with Cumbiafrica)	2022	—	—	—	—	—	—	—	—		Non-album singles
"Madonna" (with Lovra)	2022	—	—	—	—	—	—	—	—		Non-album singles
"Pra Nao Dizer" (with Jude & Frank)	2022	—	—	—	—	—	—	—	—		Non-album singles
"Fever" (with Quarterhead)	2022	—	—	—	—	—	—	—	—		Non-album singles
"Black & Blue" (with Benjamin Ingrosso)	2022	—	—	—	—	—	—	—	—		Non-album singles
"Tamo Loco" (with Lorna and Jenn Morel)	2022	—	—	—	—	—	—	—	—		Non-album singles
"Aguila" (with Westend featuring Cumbiafrica)	2022	—	—	—	—	—	—	—	—		Non-album singles
"Tengo ganas de ti" (with Damien N-Drix)	2022	—	—	—	—	—	—	—	—		Non-album singles
"Florianopolis" (with Baddies Only)	2022	—	—	—	—	—	—	—	—		Non-album singles
"Rio Rio" (with Jude & Frank and Paolo Pellegrino featuring Martina Camargo)	2022	—	—	—	—	—	—	—	—		Non-album singles
"Tra Tra" (with Blond:ish and Nfasis)	2022	—	—	—	—	—	—	—	—		Non-album singles
"Marianela (Qué Pasa)" (with Merk & Kremont and Lirico En La Casa)	2022	—	—	—	—	—	—	—	—		Non-album singles
"KLK" (with Crusy, Jenn Morel and Joelii)	2023	—	—	—	—	—	—	—	—		Non-album singles
"Pa Lante" (with Ryan Arnold and El Chuape)	2023	—	—	—	—	—	—	—	—		Non-album singles
"Como Shakira" (with Nfasis)	2023	—	—	—	—	—	—	—	—		Non-album singles
"Es un secreto" (with Blond:ish and Dalex featuring Pensión & Juanmih)	2023	—	—	—	—	—	—	—	—		Non-album singles
"Bololo" (with Tom Enzy and MC Bin Laden)	2023	—	—	—	—	—	—	—	—		Non-album singles
"NaNa Djon" (with Francis Mercier and Victor Démé)	2023	—	—	—	—	—	—	—	—		Non-album singles
"Pega" (with Andruss and Fatboi)	2023	—	—	—	—	—	—	—	—		Non-album singles
"Chakachaka" (with Tom Enzy, Nfasis and Damien N-Drix)	2023	—	—	—	—	—	—	—	—		Non-album singles
"Pompi" (with El Chuape and GSPR)	2023	—	—	—	—	—	—	—	—		Non-album singles
"Tututu" (with Malóne, PV Aparataje, KD One, CVMPANILE and Draxx (ITA))	2023	—	—	—	—	—	—	—	—		Non-album singles
"Stay High" (with Diplo and Julia Church)	2023	—	—	—	—	—	—	—	—		Non-album singles
"Ready to Go (My Addiction)"	2024	—	—	—	—	—	—	—	—		Non-album singles
"I Adore You" (with Topic and Arash featuring Daecolm)	2024	87	—	8	—	8	5	69	191	SNEP: Platinum; ARIA: Platinum; BPI: Gold; BVMI: Gold; IFPI GRE: Platinum; AFP: Gold	Non-album singles
"Coraçao" (with Jerry Ropero, Mijangos and Jesús Fernández)	2024	—	—	—	—	—	—	—	—		Non-album singles
"Go Again" (with Roger Sanchez)	2024	—	—	—	—	—	—	—	—		Non-album singles
"Forever" (with Diplo featuring Malou & Yuna)	2024	—	—	—	—	—	—	—	—		Non-album singles
"Dubai Shit" (with Maesic and Omada)	2024	—	—	—	—	—	—	—	—		Non-album singles
"All Night" (with Divolly & Markward)	2024	—	—	—	—	—	—	—	—		Non-album singles
"Elegibo" (with Dario Nunez, Margareth Menezes, Moree MK, Relight Orchestra and DJ Andrea)	2024	—	—	—	—	—	—	—	—		Non-album singles
"She Babao" (with Enzo Siffredi)	2024	—	—	—	—	—	—	—	—		Non-album singles
"Teke Teke" (with Tom Enzy)	2024	—	—	—	—	—	—	—	—		Non-album singles
"It Feels So Good" (with Matt Sassari featuring Sonique)	2024	—	—	—	—	—	—	—	—		Non-album singles
"Think of Me" (with David Guetta, Kehlani and Daecolm)	2025	—	—	—	—	—	—	—	—		Non-album singles
"Loosen Up" (with Dawty featuring Preston Harris)	2025	—	—	—	—	—	—	—	—		Non-album singles
"PYHU (Put Your Hands Up)" (with Kurd Maverick)	2025	—	—	—	—	—	—	—	—		Non-album singles
"Jamaican (Bam Bam)" (with Solto)	2025	6	—	10	55	12	5	34	36	SNEP: Platinum; BPI: Silver	Twenty One
"Movin' to the Sun" (with Imael Angel and Ultra Naté)	2026	24	21	2	42	2	2	2	27	SNEP: Gold; BPI: Gold	Twenty One
"Temptation" (with Bryson Tiller)	2026	—	—	—	—	—	—	—	—		Non-album singles
"Where She Come From" (with Quavo)	2026	—	—	—	—	—	—	—	—		Non-album singles
"Bad Bitch" (with Sexyy Red & Gatano)	2026	—	—	—	—	—	—	—	—		Non-album singles
"Mami" (with Neton Vega)	2026	—	—	—	—	—	—	—	—		Non-album singles
"H.O.U.S.E" (with Snoop Dogg)	2026	—	—	—	—	—	—	—	—		
"—" denotes recording did not chart in that territory.

=== Remixes ===
- "Mi Gente" (Hugel Remix) – J Balvin and Willy William (2017)
- "Bella Ciao" (Hugel Remix) – El Profesor (2018)
- "Sunshine in Stereo" (Hugel Remix) – Pablo Nouvelle and Andreya Triana (2018)
- "Bad" (Hugel Remix) – Christopher (2018)
- "Shadowboxer" (Hugel Remix) – The Shadowboxers (2018)
- "The Shape" (Hugel Remix) – Nico de Andrea (2018)
- "Ce Soir?" (Hugel VIP Edit) – El Profesor and Laura White (2018)
- "We Got Love" (Hugel Remix) – Sigala and Ella Henderson (2020)
- "12345SEX" (Hugel Remix) – UPSAHL (2020)
- "Breaking Me" (Hugel Remix) – Topic and A7S (2020)
- "Secrets" (Hugel Remix) – Regard and RAYE (2020)
- "Pew Pew Pew" (Hugel Remix) – Auntie Hammy (2020)
- "No Time for Tears" (Hugel Remix) – Nathan Dawe and Little Mix (2020)
- "Honey" (Hugel Remix) – Jetta (2021)
- "Made for Me" (Hugel Remix) – Muni Long (2024)
- "I Adore You" (with J Balvin and Ellie Goulding) – Hugel, Topic, Arash and Daecolm (2024)

== Awards ==
List of awards and nominations received by Hugel
Award	Year	Category	Nominee	Result	Ref
Electronic Dance Music Awards	2023	Tech House DJ of the Year	Himself	Nominated	
Electronic Dance Music Awards	2024	Breakthrough Artist of the Year	Himself	Won	
Electronic Dance Music Awards	2024	Remake of the Year	"Stay High" (with Diplo and Julia Church)	Nominated	
Electronic Dance Music Awards	2025	Remake of the Year	"Stay High" (with Diplo and Julia Church)	Nominated	
Electronic Dance Music Awards	2025	Best Collaboration	"Stay High" (with Diplo and Julia Church)	Won	
Electronic Dance Music Awards	2025	Afro House Song Of The Year	"Andalucia" (with GROSSOMODDO)	Nominated	
Electronic Dance Music Awards	2025	Afro House Song Of The Year	"I Adore You" (with Topic, Arash, Daecolm)	Won	

=== Listicles ===
Hugel on select listicles
Publisher	Year	Listicle	Placement	Ref.
1001 Tracklists	2020	Top 100 DJs	67th	
1001 Tracklists	2021	Top 100 DJs	93rd	
1001 Tracklists	2022	Top 100 DJs	20th	
1001 Tracklists	2023	Top 100 DJs	9th	
1001 Tracklists	2024	Top 100 DJs	5th	
