= Dane Court Grammar School =

Coordinates: 51°21′40″N 1°25′6″E

Location
- Broadstairs Road; Broadstairs, Kent, CT10 2RT; England

Information
- Type: Grammar school; Academy
- Motto: Academic Excellence In a Caring and Supportive Environment
- Established: 1957
- Department for Education URN: 136585 Tables
- Ofsted: Reports
- Head teacher: Martin Jones
- Gender: Coeducational
- Age: 11 to 18
- Colours: Black and yellow
- Website: www.danecourt.kent.sch.uk

Dane Court Grammar School is a coeducational grammar school with academy status in Broadstairs, Kent.

== History ==
The school was officially founded in 1957 and was, until 1980, designated as a selective Technical High School rather than a Grammar School. It celebrated its fiftieth anniversary in 2007 and in July 2010 expressed an interest in converting to an academy. It celebrated its sixtieth anniversary in 2017. The school officially became an academy on 1 April 2011.

== Description ==
The current Executive Headteacher of Coastal Academies Trust, of which Dane Court is a member, is Kate Greig, while the Headteacher (at Dane Court only) is Martin Jones.

In October 2003, Dane Court applied to become a Specialist Language College, as part of which it had to demonstrate support (both verbal and financial) from local businesses, and a commitment to promote languages within its community. The bid was successful, meaning that the school received a government grant enabling it to improve its facilities for teaching modern foreign languages (primarily German, French and Spanish). It has also attempted some outreach programmes with local primary school teachers, and adult evening classes in Spanish and Mandarin Chinese, although take-up has been limited. The school was given the Grade 2 "Good” reputation but with an Outstanding sixth form. (Ofsted 2022).

== Awards ==
Dane Court was awarded the Intermediate International Schools Award in 2006.

== Notable alumni ==
- Lucia Keskin (born 2001), comedian
- James Knott (born 1975), cricketer
- David Smith (born 1989), cricketer
