= Spring Breakers (soundtrack) =

Spring Breakers (Music from the Motion Picture)

Soundtrack album by Skrillex, Cliff Martinez and various artists
- Released: March 19, 2013
- Recorded: 2012
- Length: 41:06
- Label: Big Beat; Warner

Spring Breakers (Music from the Motion Picture) is the soundtrack to the 2012 film Spring Breakers, released through Big Beat Records and Warner Records on March 19, 2013. The album consisted of an original score jointly composed by Skrillex and Cliff Martinez along with songs from electronic dance and southern hip hop artists.

== Development ==
Cliff Martinez was recommended to Korine by the film's editor Douglas Crise who edited much of his themes as placeholder in the film. During their interaction, Korine said to Martinez, "Forget about the script. The script is just a starting point. You have to see the film." He eventually watched the film during the edit and agreed to be a part of the film. Korine sent links of Skrillex's songs to music supervisor Randall Poster. Several of his songs were included in the film, which Martinez described that he came onboard much before his involvement. He was instrumental in Skrillex being involved as he needed a trance-like experience to the film and his music being representative of that, and further added that beside the pop elements, his music also had a "bombastic and brutal electronic aspect". Despite, Skrillex's busy schedule, Korine interacted with the former through FaceTime discussing the musical process and eventually agreed on his involvement. Skrillex and Martinez jointly wrote the film's incidental music and provided dramatic underscore, despite their distinctive approaches and styles on electronic music. James Franco performed a rap portion for the film's original song "Hangin' with Da Dopeboys".

== Release ==
The track list of the film's soundtrack was first revealed through IndieWire magazine on February 18, 2013. It was exclusively made available for online streaming on March 6, 2013 through Pitchfork, prior to the digital distribution on March 12 and through CDs on March 19. The soundtrack released through Warner Music Group's Big Beat Records.

== Critical reception ==
Professional ratings
Review scores
Source	Rating
AllMusic	3.5/5 stars
Consequence of Sound	C−
Now	NNNN
Pitchfork	7.6/10
RedEye	3/4 stars
Rolling Stone	2.5/5 stars
Tampa Bay Times	A

The review aggregator website Metacritic assigned Spring Breakers (Music from the Motion Picture), a score of 68 out of 100, indicating "generally favorable reviews".

In a 3.5-star review, David Jeffries of AllMusic described the soundtrack as "a weird and wonderful set, as hyped-up, hallucinatory, and hot as the film that either oozed or sweated it out". Writing for Consequence of Sound, Amanda Kollner assigned a "C−" score to the album, stating "The album marries moments of both excess and restraint, and the dance between Skrillex and Martinez makes the ebb and flow of the music match that of the plot: a successful score." Benjamin Boles of Now wrote "The contrast between the adrenaline rushes and nihilistic machismo and the score’s cold serenity is strangely intoxicating."

Corban Goble of Pitchfork assigned 7.6 (out of 10) to the album, summarising "Given its relatively seamless mesh of spiky, aggro party music and the more contemplative electronic moments created by Martinez and Moore, Spring Breakers is the rare soundtrack that covers both extremes and makes it work as a whole." Adam Lukach of RedEye gave three out of four stars, describing the music as "a whimsical post-rock aesthetic that descends into mayhem and gloom at opportune moments". Jon Dolan of Rolling Stone described the album as "refined, minimalist, often quite lovely and even chiller than Trent Reznor's Social Network score". Sean Daly of Tampa Bay Times called the album as a "mesmerising mix". Ron Harris of San Diego Union-Tribune called it as "a decent soundtrack and a good sampler of what the spring break set is doing".

A critic from Vice described the film's soundtrack as the best trap album for the mainstream audience, further stating that "This movie and soundtrack both have a vested interest in rap culture, but given trap music's tendency to indulge and borrow from actual rap culture, the prominent placement of trap rap-aping white dudes feels appropriate." Scott Interrante of PopMatters also opined on the use of trap music in the film, while also summarising "The various ways the music is employed throughout the film helps confuse, disorient, or ground us, and the play between diegetic and non-diegetic music brings us in and out of the characters’ perspective, all amounting to a wonderfully unsettling, intriguing, and unforgettable experience."

== Track listing ==
Spring Breakers (Music from the Motion Picture) track listing
No.	Title	Performer(s)	Length
1.	"Scary Monsters and Nice Sprites"	Skrillex	4:04
2.	"Rise and Shine Little Bitch"	Cliff Martinez and Skrillex	0:35
3.	"Pretend It's a Video Game"	Cliff Martinez	3:46
4.	"With You, Friends (Long Drive)"	Skrillex	6:29
5.	"Hangin' with Da Dopeboys"	Dangeruss and James Franco	3:51
6.	"Bikinis & Big Booties Y'all"	Cliff Martinez and Skrillex	2:05
7.	"Never Gonna Get This Pussy"	Cliff Martinez	4:07
8.	"Goin' In" (Skrillex Goin' Down Mix)	Birdy Nam Nam	3:38
9.	"Fuck This Industry"	Waka Flocka Flame	5:09
10.	"Smell This Money"	Skrillex	1:46
11.	"Park Smoke"	Skrillex	3:32
12.	"Young Niggas"	Gucci Mane and Waka Flocka Flame	3:24
13.	"Your Friends Ain't Gonna Leave with You"	Cliff Martinez	5:25
14.	"Ride Home"	Skrillex	2:15
15.	"Big Bank" (featuring French Montana)	Meek Mill, Pill, Torch & Rick Ross	4:44
16.	"Son of Scary Monsters"	Cliff Martinez and Skrillex	2:04
17.	"Big 'Ol Scardy Pants"	Cliff Martinez	5:30
18.	"Scary Monsters on Strings"	Skrillex	4:03
19.	"Lights"	Ellie Goulding	3:29
Total length:			41:06

== Charts ==
Chart performance for Spring Breakers (Music from the Motion Picture)
Chart (2013)	Peak position
US Top Soundtracks (Billboard)	19
