= I Adore You (Hugel, Topic and Arash song) =

2024 single by Hugel, Topic and Arash featuring Daecolm

Single by Hugel, Topic and Arash featuring Daecolm
- Released: 19 July 2024
- Length: 3:34
- Label: Universal
- Songwriters: Alexander Tidebrink; Florent Hugel; Tobias Topic; Maximilian Riehl; Loris Cimino; Daecolm Holland; Arash Labaf
- Producers: Hugel; Topic; Loris Cimino (Late Nine); Maximilian Riehl (Late Nine); A7S

Hugel singles chronology
"La Verdolaga" (2024)	"I Adore You" (2024)	"Forever" (2024)

Topic singles chronology
"No Promises" (2024)	"I Adore You" (2024)	"Motivation (Show Me Your Heart)" (2024)

Arash singles chronology
"Layla" (2024)	"I Adore You" (2024)	"Pehli Wari" (2024)

Daecolm singles chronology
"I Don't Care" (2024)	"I Adore You" (2024)	"Don't Let Me Go" (2024)

Visualiser video
- "I Adore You" on YouTube

"I Adore You" is a song by French DJ Hugel, German DJ Topic and Iranian-Swedish singer Arash featuring British singer Daecolm. It was released on 19 July 2024 through Universal Music Group to positive reviews and commercial success.

== Background ==
Talking with Declan McDaniels from Beatportal, Florent Hugel and Tobias Topic discussed the creative process behind the song. Topic said that the basic structure was created in a music session between him, Alexander Tidebrink, Arash Labaf and Daecolm Holland, with the latter also contributing with the lyrical content. Then Hugel who listened a "very pop" version of the song via a close friend, reworked and finished the production.

Hugel stated that the artwork for the single was inspired by the visual aesthetics of American rapper XXXTENTACION.

== Critical reception ==
"I Adore You" received positive reviews from music critics upon release, being praised for its production, catchiness and for each artist's individual contribution to the song. Daniel Šikljan from We Rave You dubbed the song production as "truly sensational", as well calling the song a "testament" of the artists "exquisite chemistry" in the studio".

Dom Vigil from Prelude Press said: "From the very first note, listeners are drawn into a sonic journey that expertly marries nostalgia with a modern twist". He went further praising the production, describing it as "an immersive blend of electrifying beats and an irresistible rhythm", as well, Daecolm’s "captivating" vocal performance, stating that the singer contribution elevated the song. Zangba Thomson from Bong Mines Entertainment stated that the artists created "a track that promises to be a global hit". Katie Bain from Billboard dubbed the track as "subtle, sophisticated, radiating romance", and included it on the magazine "Best New Dance Tracks of the Week" list.

== Commercial performance ==
Within a few months after its release, the song became a hit in Europe, reaching the top 20 in Belgium (Flanders), Germany, the Netherlands and Switzerland, as well as the top 100 in Austria, Belgium (Wallonia), Portugal, Slovakia and the United Kingdom.

== Credits and personnel ==
Credits adapted from Apple Music.

- Hugel – producer, composer, programming, keyboards
- Topic – producer, composer, programming, keyboards
- Alexander Tidebrink – producer, composer, programming, keyboards
- Arash Labaf – composer, performer
- Late Nine – producer
- Joel Woolfenden – mix engineer, mastering engineer
- Daecolm – composer, vocals
- Maximilian Riehl – composer, programming, keyboards
- Loris Cimino – composer, programming, keyboards

== Track listing ==
- Digital download and streaming
1. "I Adore You" (featuring Daecolm) – 3:34
- Digital download and streaming
1. "I Adore You" (featuring Daecolm; Daecolm's Acoustic Version) – 3:34
2. "I Adore You" (featuring Daecolm) – 3:34
- Digital download and streaming – Remixes #1
1. "I Adore You" (featuring Daecolm; Grossomoddo Remix) – 4:13
2. "I Adore You" (featuring Daecolm; A-Clark & Vinny Remix) – 4:01
3. "I Adore You" (featuring Daecolm) – 3:34
- Digital download and streaming – Remixes #2
1. "I Adore You" (featuring Daecolm; Argy & Mor Avrahami Remix) – 2:51
2. "I Adore You" (featuring Daecolm) – 3:34

== Charts ==
=== Weekly charts ===
Weekly chart performance for "I Adore You"
Chart (2024–2026)	Peak position
Austria (Ö3 Austria Top 40)	10
Belarus Airplay (TopHit)	1
Belgium (Ultratop 50 Flanders)	4
Belgium (Ultratop 50 Wallonia)	12
Bulgaria Airplay (PROPHON)	1
Colombia Anglo Airplay (National-Report)	2
CIS Airplay (TopHit)	1
Croatia International Airplay (Top lista)	4
Estonia Airplay (TopHit)	1
Finland Airplay (Radiosoittolista)	52
France (SNEP)	87
Germany (GfK)	8
Germany Airplay (BVMI)	3
Global 200 (Billboard)	89
Greece International (IFPI)	1
Hungary (Dance Top 40)	14
Hungary (Rádiós Top 40)	29
Hungary (Single Top 40)	33
Ireland (IRMA)	74
Israel (Mako Hitlist)	73
Italy (FIMI)	62
Kazakhstan Airplay (TopHit)	1
Lebanon (Lebanese Top 20)	2
Lithuania (AGATA)	53
Lithuania Airplay (TopHit)	9
Luxembourg (Billboard)	3
Moldova Airplay (TopHit)	1
Netherlands (Dutch Top 40)	11
Netherlands (Single Top 100)	16
North Macedonia Airplay (Radiomonitor)	1
Norway (VG-lista)	100
Portugal (AFP)	6
Romania (Billboard)	8
Romania Airplay (UPFR)	1
Romania Airplay (Media Forest)	1
Romania TV Airplay (Media Forest)	6
Russia Airplay (TopHit)	1
Serbia Airplay (Radiomonitor)	4
Slovakia Airplay (ČNS IFPI)	60
Slovakia Singles Digital (ČNS IFPI)	45
Suriname (Nationale Top 40)	16
Sweden Heatseeker (Sverigetopplistan)	2
Switzerland (Schweizer Hitparade)	2
Turkey International Airplay (Radiomonitor Türkiye)	1
United Arab Emirates (IFPI)	10
Ukraine Airplay (TopHit)	36
UK Singles (Official Charts)	69
UK Dance (Official Charts)	17
US Hot Dance/Electronic Songs (Billboard)	8

Weekly chart performance for "I Adore You" (Daecolm's Acoustic Version)
Chart (2026)	Peak position
Belarus Airplay (TopHit)	99

=== Monthly charts ===
Monthly chart performance for "I Adore You"
Chart (2024–2025)	Peak position
Belarus Airplay (TopHit)	2
CIS Airplay (TopHit)	1
Estonia Airplay (TopHit)	3
Kazakhstan Airplay (TopHit)	2
Lithuania Airplay (TopHit)	8
Moldova Airplay (TopHit)	1
Romania Airplay (TopHit)	1
Russia Airplay (TopHit)	2
Slovakia (Rádio Top 100)	64
Slovakia (Singles Digitál Top 100)	57
Ukraine Airplay (TopHit)	48

=== Year-end charts ===
2024 year-end chart performance for "I Adore You"
Chart (2024)	Position
Belarus Airplay (TopHit)	91
Belgium (Ultratop 50 Flanders)	67
CIS Airplay (TopHit)	25
Estonia Airplay (TopHit)	72
Germany (GfK)	62
Kazakhstan Airplay (TopHit)	66
Netherlands (Dutch Top 40)	39
Netherlands (Single Top 100)	82
Portugal (AFP)	87
Romania Airplay (TopHit)	22
Switzerland (Schweizer Hitparade)	50

2025 year-end chart performance for "I Adore You"
Chart (2025)	Position
Austria (Ö3 Austria Top 40)	14
Belarus Airplay (TopHit)	3
Belgium (Ultratop 50 Flanders)	16
Belgium (Ultratop 50 Wallonia)	45
Bulgaria Airplay (PROPHON)	7
CIS Airplay (TopHit)	31
Estonia Airplay (TopHit)	78
France (SNEP)	173
Germany (GfK)	13
Global 200 (Billboard)	129
Hungary (Dance Top 40)	24
Hungary (Single Top 40)	56
Kazakhstan Airplay (TopHit)	174
Moldova Airplay (TopHit)	2
Netherlands (Single Top 100)	22
Romania Airplay (TopHit)	10
Russia Airplay (TopHit)	76
Switzerland (Schweizer Hitparade)	6

== Certifications ==
Certifications for "I Adore You"
Region	Certification	Certified units/sales
Australia (ARIA)	Platinum	70,000^{‡}
Austria (IFPI Austria)	Platinum	30,000^{‡}
Belgium (BRMA)	Platinum	40,000^{‡}
Brazil (Pro-Música Brasil)	Diamond	160,000^{‡}
Canada (Music Canada)	2× Platinum	160,000^{‡}
Denmark (IFPI Danmark)	Gold	45,000^{‡}
France (SNEP)	Diamond	333,333^{‡}
Germany (BVMI)	Platinum	600,000^{‡}
Italy (FIMI)	Platinum	200,000^{‡}
New Zealand (RMNZ)	Gold	15,000^{‡}
Poland (ZPAV)	Platinum	125,000^{‡}
Portugal (AFP)	4× Platinum	40,000^{‡}
South Africa (RISA)	Gold	20,000^{‡}
Spain (Promusicae)	Platinum	100,000^{‡}
Switzerland (IFPI Switzerland)	Platinum	30,000^{‡}
United Kingdom (BPI)	Gold	400,000^{‡}
Streaming
Greece (IFPI Greece)	Diamond	10,000,000^{†}
Slovakia (ČNS IFPI)	Platinum	1,700,000
^{‡} Sales+streaming figures based on certification alone.^{†} Streaming-only figures based on certification alone.

== J Balvin and Ellie Goulding version ==
"I Adore You" (with J Balvin and Ellie Goulding)
- J Balvin and Ellie Goulding's version

Single by Hugel, J Balvin and Ellie Goulding featuring Topic, Arash and Daecolm
- Language: English; Spanish
- Released: November 15, 2024
- Genre: Dance
- Length: 3:00
- Label: Universal; Virgin; Polydor; Capitol
- Composers: Alexander Tidebrink; Arash Labaf; Daecolm Holland; Florent Hugel; José Álvaro Osorio Balvín; Loris Cimino; Maximilian Riehl; Tobias Topic
- Producers: HUGEL; Topic; Alexander Tidebrink; Late Nine

J Balvin singles chronology
"+57" (2024)	"I Adore You" (2024)	"Rio" (2025)

Ellie Goulding singles chronology
"In My Dreams" (2024)	"I Adore You" (2024)	"Hypnotized" (2025)

Visualiser video
- "I Adore You" (remix) on YouTube

A version featuring Colombian reggaeton singer J Balvin and English electropop singer-songwriter Ellie Goulding was released on November 15, 2024 under Universal Music Group. The reworked version features a brand-new chorus in Spanish performed by Balvin, meanwhile Goulding and Daecolm both sings the original lyrics. It marks the first collaboration between Goulding and Balvin. The reworked version is 34 seconds shorter than the original. Topic and Arash are credited as featured artists alongside Daecolm on this version, while Hugel, Balvin and Goulding are credited as lead artists on streaming services.

=== Background ===
DJ Hugel debuted the version of "I Adore You" during his set on Brooklyn Mirage, alongside J Balvin performing the song live on October 7. Later on, Hugel used his social media platforms to make his followers guess the identity of the other artist on the remix, shortly after his followers recognized the vocals of Ellie Goulding. A one-minute snippet was released on social medias on October 31. The song was officially released on November 15, 2024.

=== Track listing ===
- Digital download and streaming – J Balvin & Ellie Goulding version
  1. "I Adore You (feat. Topic, Arash & Daecolm) (with J Balvin & Ellie Goulding)" – 3:00
  2. "I Adore You (feat. Daecolm)" – 3:34

=== Charts ===
==== Weekly charts ====
Weekly chart performance for "I Adore You" (with J Balvin and Ellie Goulding)"
Chart (2024–2025)	Peak position
Australia Dance (ARIA)	13
CIS Airplay (TopHit)	141
Lithuania Airplay (TopHit)	33
Romania Airplay (TopHit)	63
Russia Airplay (TopHit)	181
Ukraine Airplay (TopHit)	23

==== Monthly charts ====
Monthly chart performance for "I Adore You" (with J Balvin and Ellie Goulding)"
Chart (2024)	Peak position
Lithuania Airplay (TopHit)	45
Romania Airplay (TopHit)	77
Ukraine Airplay (TopHit)	38

==== Year-end charts ====
2025 year-end chart performance for "I Adore You" (with J Balvin and Ellie Goulding)"
Chart (2025)	Position
Lithuania Airplay (TopHit)	140

=== Certifications ===
Certifications for "I Adore You" (with J Balvin and Ellie Goulding)"
Region	Certification	Certified units/sales
Australia (ARIA)	Platinum	70,000^{‡}
^{‡} Sales+streaming figures based on certification alone.

== Release history ==
Release dates and formats for "I Adore You"
Region	Date	Format(s)	Version	Label(s)	Ref.
Various	19 July 2024	Digital download; streaming	Original	Universal; Virgin; Polydor; Capitol	
Various	23 August 2024	Digital download; streaming	Daecolm's acoustic	Universal; Virgin; Polydor; Capitol	
Various	4 October 2024	Digital download; streaming	Grossomoddo remix	Universal; Virgin; Polydor; Capitol	
Various	4 October 2024	Digital download; streaming	A-Clark and Vinny remix	Universal; Virgin; Polydor; Capitol	
Various	18 October 2024	Digital download; streaming	Argy and Mor Avrahami remix	Universal; Virgin; Polydor; Capitol	
Various	15 November 2024	Digital download; streaming	with J Balvin and Ellie Goulding	Universal; Virgin; Polydor; Capitol	
Italy	15 November 2024	Radio airplay	Original	Universal	
