= David Smith (cricketer, born 1989) =

English cricketer (born 1989)

Personal information
- Full name: David Thomas Smith
- Born: 13 September 1989 (age 37); Canterbury, Kent, England
- Height: 6 ft 1 in (1.85 m)
- Batting: Right-handed
- Bowling: Right-arm medium

Domestic team information
- Years: Team
- 2009–2011: Oxford UCCE/MCCU
- 2009–2013: Oxfordshire

Career statistics
Competition	First-class
Matches	3
Runs scored	36
Batting average	18.00
100s/50s	–/–
Top score	14*
Balls bowled	75
Wickets	1
Bowling average	64.00
5 wickets in innings	–
10 wickets in match	–
Best bowling	1/29
Catches/stumpings	4/–
- Source: Cricinfo, 24 June 2019

David Thomas Smith (born 13 September 1989) is an English former first-class cricketer.

Smith was born at Canterbury in September 1989. He was educated at Dane Court Grammar School, before going up to Oxford Brookes University. While studying at Oxford Brookes he played first-class cricket for Oxford UCCE/MCCU from 2009–11, making three appearances against Glamorgan, Hampshire and Lancashire. He scored 36 runs across his three matches, and took a single wicket with his right-arm medium pace bowling. In addition to playing first-class cricket, Smith also played minor counties cricket for Oxfordshire between 2009–13, making sixteen appearances in the Minor Counties Championship and eleven in the MCCA Knockout Trophy.
