= Things You Should Have Done =

2024 British TV sitcom

- Genre: Sitcom
- Created by: Lucia Keskin
- Written by: Lucia Keskin
- Directed by: Jack Clough
- Starring: Lucia Keskin; Selin Hizli; Jamie Bisping; Daniel Fearn
- Country of origin: United Kingdom
- Original language: English
- No. of series: 2
- No. of episodes: 12

Production
- Running time: 22–28 minutes
- Production company: Roughcut Television

Original release
- Network: BBC Three
- Release: 29 February 2024 – present

Things You Should Have Done is a British television sitcom created and written by Lucia Keskin, first broadcast on BBC Three and also on BBC iPlayer from 29 February 2024. It stars Keskin as a 'stay-at-home-daughter' who is left to fend for herself after her parents unexpectedly die, however it quickly becomes apparent she is completely unable to live independently or care for herself.

== Cast and characters ==
=== Main ===
- Lucia Keskin as Lucia "Chi" Morelli
- Selin Hizli as Karen (Series 1)
- Jamie Bisping as Lucas
- Daniel Fearn as Dave
- Bridget Christie as Ruth (Series 2)
- Ronni Ancona (Series 3)

=== Recurring ===
- Sinead Matthews as Michelle
- Steve Brody as Gary
- Martha Cope as Chi's Mum
- Darren Strange as Chi's Dad
- Sunil Patel as Solicitor Adam
- Sachin K Sharma as Chank

== Episodes ==
=== Series 1 (2024) ===
No. overall	No. in series	Title	Directed by	Written by	BBC Three airdate
1	1	"Learn to Drive"	Jack Clough	Lucia Keskin	29 February 2024
2	2	"Get a Job"	Jack Clough	Nathan Foad	29 February 2024
3	3	"Learn to Cook"	Jack Clough	Lucia Keskin	7 March 2024
4	4	"Pay Your Bills"	Jack Clough	Lucia Keskin	7 March 2024
5	5	"Do Something for Someone/Anyone"	Jack Clough	Lucia Keskin	14 March 2024
6	6	"Get Out of Kent"	Jack Clough	Lucia Keskin	14 March 2024

=== Series 2 (2026) ===
No. overall	No. in series	Title	Directed by	Written by	BBC Three airdate
7	1	"Get Therapy"	Jack Clough	Lucia Keskin	20 January 2026
8	2	"Do Something Entrepreneurial"	Jack Clough	Lucia Keskin	20 January 2026
9	3	"Give Back to Others"	Jack Clough	Lucia Keskin and Sarah Kendall	20 January 2026
10	4	"Get a GCSE"	Jack Clough	Nathan Foad	27 January 2026
11	5	"Find a Life Partner"	Jack Clough	Nathan Foad	27 January 2026
12	6	"Grow Up"	Jack Clough	Lucia Keskin	27 January 2026

== Production ==
On 24 May 2023, it was announced that the BBC had commissioned a sitcom created by Lucia Keskin. Filming for the series took place at several locations in Thanet, Kent, including Broadstairs, Margate, and Ramsgate. The series was inspired by the loss of Keskin's grandfather.
In September 2024, a second series was announced which was broadcast on BBC Three on 20 January 2026 with all episodes of Series 2 having been made available on BBC iPlayer on 31 December 2025.
In May 2026, it was announced that the BBC had renewed Things You Should Have Done for a third series.

== Reception ==
=== Critical reception ===
Things You Should Have Done has received mixed reviews from critics. Isobel Lewis, in a four-star review for iNews, praises Keskin's performance as "a deadpan masterpiece; it takes an incredibly sharp comic actor to play dim this well", and that "this is comedy built entirely around her tastes, and those craving a properly silly show will lap it up".

In a review for Digital Spy, Jamie Windust writes that "Keskin's dark comedy perfectly cast and hilariously stupid" and "taps into comedic devices that twenty-something Brits love". In comments for The Guardian, Coco Khan adds that the sitcom "showcases the best of Keskin's creative journey" and "her clear potential as a screenwriter with a knack for what audiences find funny and moving".

In a three-star review for The Guardian, Lucy Mangan writes, "[the show] has a fine cast, some good moments [...] and plenty of unrealised potential on show", adding that "the death of Chi's parents is just a device – and a potentially wasted one at that: it doesn't make it in any way a show about grief, which might have provided more depth". She concluded that the show "stops feeling quite so much like a loose coalition of slightly underbaked ideas" when "Karen or Lucas ground it more firmly in reality – emotional or otherwise". Lucy Sweet, writing for The Big Issue, states the show "is still a work in progress" and "the plot seems pretty unhinged and might be in need of some intervention", but adds that "it's worth it to see Keskin flexing her deeply weird skills".

During an episode of the podcast Off the Telly, co-hosted by Joanna Page and Natalie Cassidy, Page branded the series as "shit" and "boring", adding that she "shouldn't have bothered [to watch it]". In response, Keskin reacted to Page's review with a TikTok video, later stating on Twitter that "there is a way of [criticising] without making someone feel terrible about their work whilst being in the industry themselves". Page was subsequently criticised for her comments. Page's Gavin & Stacey co-star Mathew Horne however described the series as "the best thing on television right now".

=== Accolades ===
Year	Nominee / work	Award	Result
2025	Things You Should Have Done	Royal Television Society Programme Award for Scripted Comedy	Won
2025	Lucia Keskin	British Academy Television Craft Award for Best Emerging Talent: Fiction	Won
