= Lucia Keskin =

English comedian, actress and internet personality (born 2001)

- Born: Lucia Ella Keskin; 9 February 2001 (age 25); Margate, Kent, England
- Education: Dane Court Grammar School
- Occupations: Comedian; actress; writer; YouTuber; internet personality
- Years active: 2017–present
- Television: Big Boys (2022); Sneakerhead (2022); Things You Should Have Done (2024)

YouTube information
- Channel: Chi With A C
- Genres: Comedy; music; vlogs
- Subscribers: 457 thousand
- Views: 42 million
- Last updated: 18 October 2026

Lucia Ella Keskin (born 9 February 2001), also known as Chi with a C /ˈtʃiː/, is an English comedian, actress, writer, YouTuber and internet personality. She began her career posting comedy sketches and parody videos on YouTube before appearing in television series including Big Boys and Sneakerhead. In 2024, she created, wrote and starred in the BBC Three sitcom Things You Should Have Done. For her writing on the series, Keskin won the British Academy Television Craft Award for Best Emerging Talent: Fiction in 2025.

== Early and personal life ==
Keskin is from Margate, Kent. She attended Dane Court Grammar School, Broadstairs. She briefly worked as an assistant in a dance school, after leaving education with just one GCSE. She also trained at The Canterbury Academy Institute of Performing Arts, studying musical theatre.

In January 2022, Keskin announced she was in a relationship with a woman. However, she confirmed she was again single a year later via an Instagram post.

Lucia has been in a relationship with Director Jack Clough since June 2025. He directs Lucia's TV show Things You Should Have Done.

In a 2026 interview, Keskin stated that she is on ADHD medication.

== Career ==
Keskin began uploading videos on YouTube in 2017. Her first viral video was an impersonation of Gemma Collins uploaded to Facebook in 2018 and first YouTube hit was a September 2018 reenactment of Friends' pilot episode. Subsequently, Keskin appeared on BBC News, accidentally Skypeing the channel during another interview. She has performed several other parodies of TV shows and characters, using greenscreen. In The Daily Telegraph, Eleanor Halls described Keskin as "the funniest person online right now." Keskin featured at the 2019 Summer in the City festival.

In 2020, Keskin's parody of American Horror Story was praised by Sarah Paulson, an actress of the series. Paulson agreed with comments that encouraged Netflix to commission Keskin for her own show.

In December 2020, Keskin appeared in a YouTube video advertising Sky Q alongside breakfast television presenter Lorraine Kelly, whom Keskin has impersonated in the past. They discussed popular television programmes available on the service, in addition to Kelly ranking several of Keskin's parody videos including a breakfast television parody in which she parodied Lorraine.

In May 2022, Keskin made her television acting debut in the Channel 4 series Big Boys as Kelly. In July 2022, Keskin starred in the sitcom Sneakerhead which aired on Dave.

In May 2023, Keskin announced that she had written and would be starring in a six-part sitcom for BBC Three titled Things You Should Have Done. It is based on a dysfunctional family concept in where the daughter Chi played by Keskin, learns to cope with independence following the death of her parents. It fully debuted on BBC iPlayer in February 2024, and released episodes live weekly on BBC Three.

In March 2024, she appeared in the first episode of the third series of Mandy as Shona, a plane passenger who couldn't get the film Jumanji to play on her in-flight entertainment system.

The second series of Things You Should Have Done was broadcast in 2026. Reviewing the series for The Guardian, Hannah J Davies described Keskin as remaining "perfectly gormless as Chi" and noted the programme's continued surreal style. In March 2026, the series won the Royal Television Society Programme Award for Scripted Comedy for the second consecutive year.

Later that month, Keskin and Jamie Bisping reprised their roles as Chi and Lucas in the online spin-off What Have You Done?, in which the characters interviewed celebrity guests on Ramsgate Boating Lake.

In May 2026, the BBC commissioned a third six-episode series of Things You Should Have Done, with Keskin returning as creator and star. In October 2026, filming began in Ramsgate on the third series of Things You Should Have Done, consisting of six episodes. Ronni Ancona joined the cast, while Keskin returned as creator, writer, executive producer and lead actor.

== Filmography ==
Year	Title	Role	Notes	Ref.
2019	BBC News	Herself	Television interview	
2019	Britain's Extreme Weather	Herself	Archive footage	
2022–2025	Big Boys	Kelly	7 episodes	
2022	Sneakerhead	Amber	Main role	
2022	Live at the Moth Club	Ellen	Main role	
2024–present	Things You Should Have Done	Chi	Main role; also writer	
2024	Mandy	Shona	Episode: "Destination: Dundee"	
2025	Mandy	Chip Shop Customer	Episode: "Mand on the Run"	
2025	Would I Lie to You?	Herself	Panellist; series 18 episode 7	
2026	What Have You Done?	Chi	Online spin-off of Things You Should Have Done; co-host with Jamie Bisping	
2026	Stepping Up	Kelcie	Channel 4 series	

== Accolades ==
Year	Nominee / work	Award	Result
2025	Things You Should Have Done	Royal Television Society Programme Award for Scripted Comedy	Won
2025	Things You Should Have Done	British Academy Television Craft Award for Best Emerging Talent: Fiction	Won
2025	Cunk on Life	Primetime Emmy Award for Outstanding Writing for a Variety Special	Nominated
2026	Things You Should Have Done	Royal Television Society Programme Award for Scripted Comedy	Won
2026	Things You Should Have Done	British Academy Television Award for Best Scripted Comedy	Nominated
