= Ellie Goulding discography =

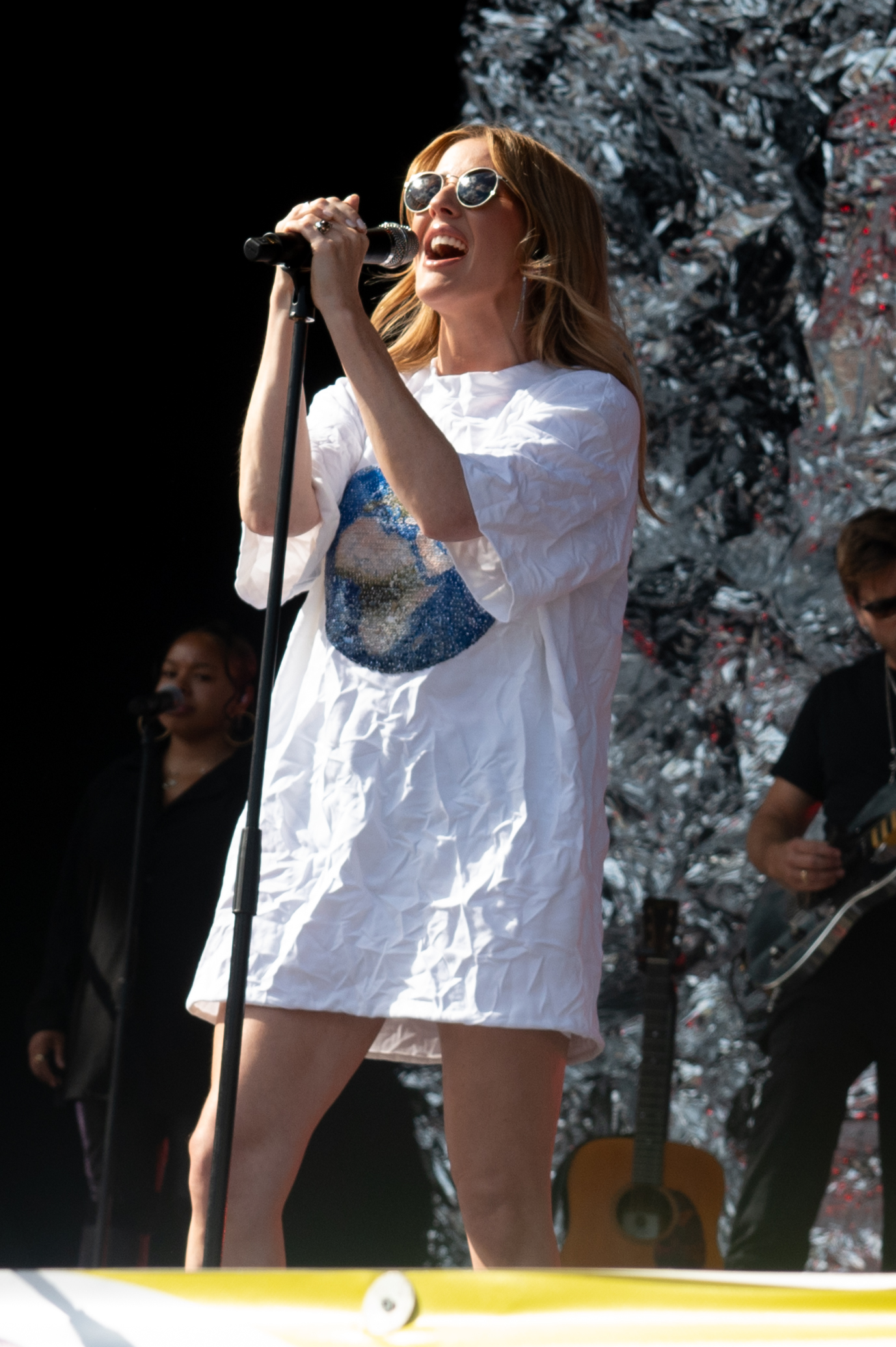
- Goulding performing at the Superbloom Festival in Germany, 2023
- Studio albums: 6
- Extended plays: 9
- Singles: 54
- Music videos: 60
- Reissues: 3
- Remix albums: 2
- Promotional singles: 13

The English singer-songwriter Ellie Goulding has released six studio albums, two remix albums, ninth extended plays (EPs), 54 singles (including 11 as a featured artist), 13 promotional singles and 60 music videos. She had sold over 2.6 million albums and over 15 million singles (including collaborations) in the United Kingdom alone as of August 2024. According to Recording Industry Association of America (RIAA), Goulding has sold 28.5 million digital singles and 4.5 million albums in the United States. After signing to Polydor Records in July 2009, Goulding released her debut extended play, An Introduction to Ellie Goulding, in December of that year. It was followed by the release of her debut studio album, Lights, in February 2010. The album debuted at number one on the UK Albums Chart and subsequently earned a double platinum certification from the British Phonographic Industry (BPI). It spawned four singles: "Under the Sheets", "Starry Eyed", "Guns and Horses" and "The Writer", which reached numbers 53, four, 26 and 19 on the UK singles chart, respectively. In November 2010, the album was re-released as Bright Lights; it featured seven new songs, including a cover version of Elton John's "Your Song", which peaked at number two on the UK singles chart. The sixth single to be lifted from the album, "Lights", peaked at No. 49 in the United Kingdom, while becoming Goulding's highest-charting single to date in the United States and Canada, where it reached numbers two and seven, respectively.

Goulding's second studio album, Halcyon, was released in October 2012, peaking at number one in the UK and reaching the top 10 in Canada, Germany and the US. It was later certified triple platinum by the BPI and gold by the Recording Industry Association of America (RIAA). The album's lead single, "Anything Could Happen", earned Goulding her third top-five song on the UK Singles Chart when it peaked at number five. The track also became her first charting single in Australia (number 20) and second appearance on the US Billboard Hot 100 (number 47). Subsequent singles "Figure 8" and "Explosions" peaked at numbers 33 and 13 on the UK chart, respectively. In 2013, Goulding was featured on Calvin Harris's single "I Need Your Love", which reached number four in the UK. That same year, her album Halcyon was reissued as Halcyon Days, containing 10 additional tracks. It was preceded by the lead single "Burn", which gave Goulding her first UK number-one single. The song also became an international success, charting inside the top 10 in several countries. Halcyon Days yielded two more singles: a cover of "How Long Will I Love You" by the Waterboys and "Goodness Gracious". In 2014, Goulding recorded the song "Beating Heart" for the soundtrack to Divergent, and she also released her second collaboration with Calvin Harris, titled "Outside". The following year, she contributed the song "Love Me like You Do" to the soundtrack to Fifty Shades of Grey. "Love Me like You Do" became a commercial success worldwide, earning Goulding her second UK number one and topping the charts in several other countries.

Goulding's third studio album, Delirium, was released in November 2015 and peaked at number three in the United Kingdom, the United States and Australia, while reaching the top five in several other countries. The album spawned three singles: "On My Mind", "Army" and "Something in the Way You Move". In 2016, Goulding recorded the song "Still Falling for You" for the soundtrack to Bridgit Jones' Baby. On the same year, Goulding announced that she was going on indefinite hiatus. During the hiatus, to keep in touch with her fans, Goulding released several stand-alone singles: "First Time" with the Norwegian DJ and record producer Kygo, "Return to Love" with the Italian tenor Andrea Bocelli, and the cover versions of Don McLean's "Vincent", the Christmas carol "O Holy Night", and her rendition of Joni Mitchell's "River", which became Goulding's third number-one in her homecountry and the last number-one single of the 2010s in the UK. After a five-year gap, Goulding made her long-awaited return with her fourth studio album, Brightest Blue, which peaked at number one in the UK, her third album to do so. The record was split into two sides; the first side Brightest Blue, marked the return of Goulding introspective sound and it spanned the singles: "Flux", "Power" and "Love I'm Given", while the second side of the record, titled EG.0, was a more commercial sound, and described by Goulding herself as the songs that her record label (Polydor) wants her to do. It spawned several singles, including: "Close to Me", "Hate Me", "Sixteen", "Slow Grenade" and "Worry About Me", while the first three saw international commercial success.

In 2023, Goulding and Harris released their third collaboration, titled "Miracle". The track was a commercial success in Europe, specially in the United Kingdom where it became Goulding's 35 chart entry in the UK Official Singles Charts, the most entries for any British female soloist in history, and spent eight non-consecutive weeks at number one, becoming Goulding's fourth UK number-one, and her longest running number one single to date. In its second week at number one, Goulding's fifth studio album, Higher Than Heaven was released and debuted atop the UK Albums Chart, marking the first time Goulding simultaneously had a number-one single and album in her career. The record also became her fourth UK number-one album, tying with Adele, as the British female artists with the most number ones albums in UK history. The album spawned the singles: "Easy Lover", "All by Myself", "Let It Die", "Like a Saviour" and "By the End of the Night". In September 2023, Goulding collaborated with music producer TSHA, and singer-songwriter Gregory Porter, on the single "Somebody". During 2024, Goulding released two remixes: "Brightest Blue" (with Nature), and "I Adore You" (alongside J Balvin) and three acclaimed electronic dance collaborations: "Leave Me Slowly" (with Starsmith), "Free" (with Calvin Harris), and "In My Dreams" (with Four Tet). She also appeared as a featured artist on "My Life/Happiness (Skit)" from Big Sean's Better Me Than You (2024). Goulding achieved further acclaim with the release of "Hypnotized" (with Anyma) in early 2025. She followed this with two more singles later that year: "Save My Love" (with Marshmello and Avaion) and "Destiny", which was released as the ending them for the Japanese manga series Clevatess. In 2026, Goulding appeared as a featured artist on two records: "Don't Want Your Love" from Illenium's Odyssey and "Hush" from Muse's The Wow! Signal. Goulding's sixth studio album I Know Too Much was released on 4 September 2026, spawning four singles: "Black Prada Dress", "4 Seasons", "Ravers" and "For Your Entertainment".

== Albums ==
=== Studio albums ===
List of studio albums, with selected chart positions, sales figures and certifications
Title	Details	Peak chart positions										Sales (Note: Traditional or pure sales (physical and digital) and not stream equivalent units.)	Certifications
Title	Details	UK	AUS	BEL (FL)	CAN	FRA	GER	IRE	NZ	SWI	US	Sales	Certifications
Lights	Released: 26 February 2010; Label: Polydor; Formats: CD, LP, digital download	1	—	54	66	—	42	6	28	90	21	UK: 840,000 (Note: United Kingdom sales figures for Lights as of April 2020.); US: 300,000 (Note: United States sales figures for Lights as of June 2012.)	BPI: 2× Platinum; MC: Platinum; RIAA: Platinum; RMNZ: Gold
Halcyon	Released: 5 October 2012; Label: Polydor; Formats: CD, LP, digital download	1	16	14	8	85	8	1	3	7	9	UK: 1,469,289 (Note: United Kingdom sales figures for Halcyon as of September 2026.); US: 522,000 (Note: United States sales figures for Halcyon as of September 2015.)	BPI: 4× Platinum; ARIA: Gold; BVMI: Gold; IFPI SWI: Gold; MC: 2× Platinum; RIAA: 2× Platinum
Delirium	Released: 6 November 2015; Label: Polydor; Formats: CD, LP, digital download	3	3	1	2	34	5	2	4	5	3	UK: 355,000 (Note: United Kingdom sales figures for Delirium as of March 2020.); FRA: 7,000 (Note: France sales figures for Delirium as of December 2015.); US: 117,000 (Note: United States sales figures for Delirium as of February 2016.)	BPI: Platinum; MC: 2× Platinum; RIAA: Platinum; RMNZ: 2× Platinum
Brightest Blue	Released: 17 July 2020; Label: Polydor; Formats: CD, LP, digital download	1	25	17	38	101	12	9	19	9	29		BPI: Silver; MC: Gold; RIAA: Gold; RMNZ: Gold
Higher Than Heaven	Released: 7 April 2023; Label: Polydor; Formats: CD, LP, digital download	1	—	5	—	86	20	97	—	28	125		
I Know Too Much	Released: 4 September 2026; Label: Polydor; Formats: CD, LP, digital download, cassette	16	—	20	—	— (Note: I Know Too Much did not enter the French Top Albums chart, but peaked at number 134 on the French Physical Albums chart.)	37	—	—	50	—		
"—" denotes a recording that did not chart in that territory.

=== Reissues ===
List of reissues, with selected chart positions
Title	Details	Peak chart positions						Certifications
Title	Details	AUS	AUT	BEL (FL)	FIN	NZ	SWE	Certifications
Bright Lights	Released: 26 November 2010; Label: Polydor; Formats: CD, digital download	—	56	179	—	—	—	
Halcyon Days	Released: 23 August 2013; Label: Polydor; Formats: CD, digital download	4	23	—	30	1	22	IFPI SWE: Gold; RMNZ: 4× Platinum
Halcyon Nights	Released: 12 October 2022; Label: Polydor; Formats: Digital download	—	—	—	—	—	—	BPI: Silver
"—" denotes a recording that did not chart in that territory.

=== Remix albums ===
Title	Details
Halcyon Days: The Remixes	Released: 27 May 2014; Label: Polydor; Format: Digital download
Brightest Blue: Music for Calm	Released: 8 January 2021; Label: Polydor; Format: Digital download

== Extended plays ==
List of extended plays, with selected chart positions
Title	Details	Peaks	
Title	Details	UK	US
An Introduction to Ellie Goulding	Released: 20 December 2009; Label: Polydor; Formats: CD, digital download	—	—
iTunes Festival: London 2010	Released: 15 July 2010; Label: Polydor; Format: Digital download	—	—
Run into the Light	Released: 30 August 2010; Label: Polydor; Format: Digital download	102	—
Live at Amoeba San Francisco	Released: 21 November 2011; Label: Interscope; Format: CD	—	—
iTunes Festival: London 2012	Released: 19 November 2012; Label: Polydor; Format: Digital download	—	—
iTunes Festival: London 2013	Released: 17 October 2013; Label: Polydor; Format: Digital download	—	—
iTunes Session	Released: 10 December 2013; Label: Polydor; Format: Digital download	—	190
Songbook for Christmas	Released: 20 November 2020; Re-released: 1 December 2023; Label: Universal Music Group; Format: Digital download	—	—
EG.0	Released: 17 July 2020 (Note: Also known as "Side B", originally released as the second side of Brightest Blue.); Re-released: 16 October 2026; Label: Polydor; Format: CD, Digital download	—	—
"—" denotes a recording that did not chart in that territory.

== Singles ==
=== As lead artist ===
==== 2000s and 2010s ====
List of singles as lead artist, with selected chart positions and certifications, showing year released and album name
Title	Year	Peak chart positions										Sales	Certifications	Album
Title	Year	UK	AUS	BEL (FL)	CAN	FRA	GER	IRE	NZ	SWI	US	Sales	Certifications	Album
"Under the Sheets"	2009	53	—	— (Note: "Under the Sheets" did not enter the Ultratop 50, but peaked at number three on the Flemish Ultratip chart.)	—	—	91	—	—	—	—	UK: 42,960 (Note: United Kingdom sales figures for "Under the Sheets" as of March 2010.)		Lights
"Starry Eyed"	2010	4	—	— (Note: "Starry Eyed" did not enter the Ultratop 50, but peaked at number 14 on the Flemish Ultratip chart.)	—	—	46	4	26	—	—	UK: 775,000 (Note: United Kingdom sales figures for "Starry Eyed" as of April 2023.)	BPI: Platinum; RIAA: Gold	Lights
"Guns and Horses"	2010	26	—	—	—	—	—	—	—	—	—			Lights
"The Writer"	2010	19	—	—	—	—	—	—	—	—	—			Lights
"Your Song"	2010	2	—	—	—	126	75	5	—	56	—	UK: 1,300,000 (Note: United Kingdom sales figures for "Your Song" as of April 2023.)	BPI: 2× Platinum; RIAA: Gold; RMNZ: Gold	Bright Lights
"Lights"	2011	49	—	10	7	29	11	—	16	14	2	US: 4,212,000 (Note: United States sales figures for "Lights" as of January 2014.)	BPI: Platinum; BRMA: Gold; BVMI: Platinum; IFPI SWI: Platinum; RIAA: 7× Platinum; RMNZ: 3× Platinum	Bright Lights
"Anything Could Happen"	2012	5	20	31	37	—	66	16	16	68	47	UK: 620,000 (Note: United Kingdom sales figures for "Anything Could Happen" as of April 2023.); US: 1,166,000 (Note: United States sales figures for "Anything Could Happen" as of January 2014.)	BPI: Platinum; ARIA: Gold; RIAA: 2× Platinum; RMNZ: Platinum	Halcyon
"Figure 8"	2012	33	—	—	—	—	—	—	7	—	—		RMNZ: Platinum	Halcyon
"Explosions"	2013	13	—	—	— (Note: "Explosions" did not enter the Canadian Hot 100, but did peak at number 72 on the Hot Canadian Digital Song Sales chart.)	—	—	51	—	—	100	UK: 400,000 (Note: United Kingdom sales figures for "Explosions" as of October 2025.)	BPI: Gold	Halcyon
"Burn"	2013	1	6	3	14	9	4	2	7	5	13	UK: 1,400,000 (Note: United Kingdom sales figures for "Burn" as of April 2023.); FRA: 41,300 (Note: France sales figures for "Burn" as of December 2013.); US: 2,000,000 (Note: United States sales figures for "Burn" as of July 2014.)	BPI: 3× Platinum; ARIA: 3× Platinum; BRMA: Gold; BVMI: Platinum; IFPI SWI: Platinum; RIAA: 5× Platinum; RMNZ: 3× Platinum	Halcyon Days
"How Long Will I Love You"	2013	3	46	3	—	—	—	3	6	16	—	UK: 1,500,000 (Note: United Kingdom sales figures for "How Long Will I Love You" as of April 2023.)	BPI: 3× Platinum; ARIA: Gold; BRMA: Gold; RIAA: Platinum; RMNZ: 2× Platinum	Halcyon Days
"Goodness Gracious"	2014	16	39	— (Note: "Goodness Gracious" did not enter the Ultratop 50, but peaked at number five on the Flemish Ultratip chart.)	—	—	—	10	—	—	—			Halcyon Days
"Beating Heart"	2014	9	38	— (Note: "Beating Heart" did not enter the Ultratop 50, but peaked at number two on the Flemish Ultratip chart.)	79	84	—	8	20	—	88	US: 55,000 (Note: United States sales figures for "Beating Heart" as of March 2014.)	RIAA: Gold; RMNZ: Gold	Divergent: Original Motion Picture Soundtrack
"Love Me Like You Do"	2015	1	1	2	3	5	1	1	1	1	3	UK: 2,400,000 (Note: United Kingdom sales figures for "Love Me Like You Do" as of April 2023.); FRA: 69,500 (Note: France sales figures for "Love Me Like You Do" as of December 2015.)	BPI: 5× Platinum; ARIA: 9× Platinum; BRMA: 2× Platinum; BVMI: Diamond; IFPI SWI: Platinum; MC: 7× Platinum; RIAA: 8× Platinum; RMNZ: 6× Platinum; SNEP: Gold	Fifty Shades of Grey: Original Motion Picture Soundtrack
"On My Mind"	2015	5	3	10	10	61	9	6	4	17	13	UK: 763,000 (Note: United Kingdom sales figures for "On My Mind" as of April 2023.); US: 809,000 (Note: United States sales figures for "On My Mind" as of February 2016.)	BPI: Platinum; ARIA: 2× Platinum; BRMA: Gold; BVMI: Gold; MC: Platinum; RIAA: 2× Platinum; RMNZ: 2× Platinum	Delirium
"Army"	2016	20	87	41	—	—	—	53	—	—	—		BPI: Gold	Delirium
"Something in the Way You Move"	2016	51	46	17	59	97	70	62	—	58	43	US: 143,655 (Note: United States sales figures for "Something in the Way You Move" as of February 2016.)	RIAA: Gold; RMNZ: Gold	Delirium
"Still Falling for You"	2016	11	21	16	62	23	33	20	20	10	— (Note: "Still Falling for You" did not enter the Billboard Hot 100, but peaked at number two on the Bubbling Under Hot 100 Singles chart.)	UK: 811,000 (Note: United Kingdom sales figures for "Still Falling for You" as of April 2023.)	BPI: Platinum; ARIA: Gold; BVMI: Gold; RIAA: Gold; RMNZ: Platinum; SNEP: Gold	Bridget Jones's Baby: Original Motion Picture Soundtrack
"First Time" (with Kygo)	2017	34	29	— (Note: "First Time" did not enter the Ultratop 50, but peaked at number one on the Flemish Ultratip chart.)	26	34	28	21	32	14	67	US: 63,271 (Note: United States sales figures for "First Time" as of September 2017.)	BPI: Gold; ARIA: Platinum; BVMI: Gold; IFPI SWI: Platinum; MC: 2× Platinum; RIAA: Gold; RMNZ: Platinum; SNEP: Gold	Stargazing
"O Holy Night"	2017	—	—	—	—	—	—	—	—	—	—			Songbook for Christmas
"Vincent"	2018	—	—	—	—	—	—	—	—	—	—			Songbook for Christmas
"Close to Me" (with Diplo and Swae Lee)	2018	17	25	16	24	91	44	8	17	52	24		BPI: Platinum; ARIA: 2× Platinum; BRMA: Gold; MC: 2× Platinum; RIAA: 2× Platinum; RMNZ: 2× Platinum; SNEP: Gold	Brightest Blue
"Flux"	2019	97	—	—	—	—	—	—	— (Note: "Flux" did not enter the NZ Top 40 Singles Chart, but peaked at number 32 on the NZ Hot Singles Chart.)	—	—			Brightest Blue
"Sixteen" (Note: "Sixteen" only appears as a digital bonus track on Brightest Blue.)	2019	21	85	50	— (Note: "Sixteen" did not enter the Canadian Hot 100, but did peak at number 44 on the Hot Canadian Digital Song Sales chart.)	—	64	20	— (Note: "Sixteen" did not enter the NZ Top 40 Singles Chart, but peaked at number eight on the NZ Hot Singles Chart.)	95	—		BPI: Gold; RIAA: Gold; RMNZ: Gold	Brightest Blue
"Hate Me" (with Juice Wrld)	2019	33	93	— (Note: "Hate Me" did not enter the Ultratop 50, but peaked at number 32 on the Flemish Ultratip chart.)	33	—	70	33	—	—	56		BPI: Platinum; BVMI: Gold; MC: Platinum; RIAA: 3× Platinum; RMNZ: Platinum	Brightest Blue
"River"	2019	1	—	—	—	—	—	—	—	—	—		BPI: Silver	Songbook for Christmas
"—" denotes a recording that did not chart in that territory.

==== 2020s ====
List of singles as lead artist, with selected chart positions and certifications, showing year released and album name
Title	Year	Peak chart positions										Certifications	Album
Title	Year	UK	AUS	BEL (FL)	CAN	FRA	GER	IRE	NZ	SWI	US	Certifications	Album
"Worry About Me" (featuring Blackbear)	2020	78	—	—	—	—	—	—	— (Note: "Worry About Me" did not enter the NZ Top 40 Singles Chart, but peaked at number 16 on the NZ Hot Singles Chart.)	—	—		Brightest Blue
"Power"	2020	86	—	—	—	—	—	—	— (Note: "Power" did not enter the NZ Top 40 Singles Chart, but peaked at number 31 on the NZ Hot Singles Chart.)	—	—		Brightest Blue
"Slow Grenade" (featuring Lauv)	2020	—	—	—	—	—	—	—	— (Note: "Slow Grenade" did not enter the NZ Top 40 Singles Chart, but peaked at number nine on the NZ Hot Singles Chart.)	—	— (Note: "Slow Grenade" did not enter the Hot 100, but peaked at number 31 on the Digital Songs chart.)		Brightest Blue
"Love I'm Given"	2020	—	—	—	—	—	—	—	— (Note: "Love I'm Given" did not enter the NZ Top 40 Singles Chart, but peaked at number 31 on the NZ Hot Singles Chart.)	—	—		Brightest Blue
"Easy Lover" (featuring Big Sean)	2022	— (Note: "Easy Lover" did not enter the UK Singles Chart Top 100, but peaked at number 31 on the UK Singles Downloads Chart Top 100.)	—	—	—	—	—	—	— (Note: "Easy Lover" did not enter the NZ Top 40 Singles Chart, but peaked at number 27 on the NZ Hot Singles Chart.)	—	—		Higher Than Heaven (Note: "All by Myself" only appears on the deluxe edition of Higher Than Heaven.)
"All by Myself" (Note: "All by Myself" also appears on Sigala's debut compilation album Every Cloud – Silver Linings.) (with Alok and Sigala)	2022	—	—	22	—	116	—	—	— (Note: "All by Myself" did not enter the NZ Top 40 Singles Chart, but peaked at number 30 on the NZ Hot Singles Chart.)	—	— (Note: "All by Myself" did not enter the Hot 100, but peaked at number 9 on the Dance/Mix Show Airplay chart.)	SNEP: Gold	Higher Than Heaven
"Let It Die"	2022	—	—	—	—	—	—	—	— (Note: "Let It Die" did not enter the NZ Top 40 Singles Chart, but peaked at number 32 on the NZ Hot Singles Chart.)	—	—		Higher Than Heaven
"Like a Saviour"	2023	— (Note: "Like a Saviour" did not enter the UK Singles Chart, but peaked at number 37 on the UK Singles Downloads Chart.)	—	—	—	—	—	—	— (Note: "Like a Saviour" did not enter the NZ Top 40 Singles Chart, but peaked at number 35 on the NZ Hot Singles Chart.)	—	—		Higher Than Heaven
"Miracle" (with Calvin Harris)	2023	1	13	4	71	20	43	1	37	23	— (Note: "Miracle" did not enter the Hot 100, but peaked at number 1 on the Dance/Mix Show Airplay chart.)	BPI: 2× Platinum; ARIA: 2× Platinum; BRMA: 2× Platinum; IFPI SWI: 2× Platinum; RIAA: Gold; RMNZ: Platinum; SNEP: Diamond	96 Months
"By the End of the Night"	2023	— (Note: "By the End of the Night" did not enter the UK Singles Chart, but peaked at number 81 on the UK Singles Downloads Chart.)	—	—	—	—	—	—	—	—	—		Higher Than Heaven
"Somebody" (with TSHA and Gregory Porter)	2023	—	—	—	—	—	—	—	—	—	—		Non-album single
"Free" (with Calvin Harris)	2024	35	—	—	—	—	—	60	— (Note: "Free" did not enter the NZ Top 40 Singles Chart, but peaked at number eight on the NZ Hot Singles Chart.)	—	— (Note: "Free" did not enter the Hot 100, but peaked at number 1 on the Dance/Mix Show Airplay chart.)	BPI: Silver	96 Months
"In My Dreams" (with Four Tet)	2024	—	—	—	—	—	—	—	—	—	—		Non-album singles
"I Adore You" (with Hugel and J Balvin featuring Topic, Arash and Daecolm)	2024	—	—	—	—	—	—	—	—	—	—	ARIA: Platinum	Non-album singles
"Hypnotized" (with Anyma)	2025	— (Note: "Hypnotized" did not enter the UK Singles Chart, but peaked at number 25 on the UK Singles Downloads Chart, and at number 30 on the UK Singles Sales Chart.)	—	12	—	—	—	—	— (Note: "Hypnotized" did not enter the NZ Top 40 Singles Chart, but peaked at number 12 on the NZ Hot Singles Chart.)	—	— (Note: "Free" did not enter the Hot 100, but peaked at number 1 on the Dance/Mix Show Airplay chart.)		The End of Genesys
"Save My Love" (with Marshmello and Avaion)	2025	—	—	—	—	—	—	—	— (Note: "Save My Love" did not enter the NZ Top 40 Singles Chart, but peaked at number 19 on the NZ Hot Singles Chart.)	—	— (Note: "Save My Love" did not enter the Hot 100, but peaked at number 2 on the Dance/Mix Show Airplay chart.)		Non-album singles
"Destiny"	2025	—	—	—	—	—	—	—	—	—	—		Non-album singles
"Black Prada Dress"	2026	— (Note: "Black Prada Dress" did not enter the UK Singles Chart, but peaked at number 98 on the UK Singles Downloads Chart.)	—	—	—	—	—	—	—	—	—		I Know Too Much
"4 Seasons"	2026	—	—	—	—	—	—	—	—	—	—		I Know Too Much
"Ravers"	2026	—	—	—	—	—	—	—	—	—	—		I Know Too Much
"For Your Entertainment"	2026	—	—	—	—	—	—	—	— (Note: "For Your Entertainment" did not enter the NZ Top 40 Singles Chart, but peaked at number 23 on the NZ Hot Singles Chart.)	—	—		I Know Too Much
"—" denotes a recording that did not chart in that territory.

=== As featured artist ===
List of singles as featured artist, with selected chart positions and certifications, showing year released and album name
Title	Year	Peak chart positions										Sales	Certifications	Album
Title	Year	UK	AUS	BEL (FL)	CAN	FRA	GER	IRE	NZ	SWI	US	Sales	Certifications	Album
"Wonderman" (Tinie Tempah featuring Ellie Goulding)	2010	12	—	—	—	—	—	16	—	—	—		BPI: Gold	Disc-Overy
"I Need Your Love" (Calvin Harris featuring Ellie Goulding)	2013	4	3	8	13	10	13	6	15	6	16	UK: 902,000 (Note: United Kingdom sales figures for "I Need Your Love" as of April 2023.); FRA: 59,000 (Note: France sales figures for "I Need Your Love" as of December 2013.)	BPI: 2× Platinum; ARIA: 5× Platinum; BRMA: Gold; BVMI: Platinum; IFPI SWI: Platinum; MC: 4× Platinum; RIAA: 3× Platinum; RMNZ: 2× Platinum	18 Months
"Flashlight" (DJ Fresh featuring Ellie Goulding)	2014	47	—	— (Note: "Flashlight" did not enter the Ultratop 50, but peaked at number 21 on the Flemish Ultratip chart.)	—	—	—	—	—	—	—			Halcyon Days
"Outside" (Calvin Harris featuring Ellie Goulding)	2014	6	7	8	10	19	1	5	7	5	29	UK: 1,200,000 (Note: United Kingdom sales figures for "Outside" as of April 2023.)	BPI: 3× Platinum; ARIA: 5× Platinum; BVMI: 3× Gold; MC: 4× Platinum; RIAA: 3× Platinum; RMNZ: 4× Platinum	Motion
"Do They Know It's Christmas?" (as part of Band Aid 30)	2014	1	3	1	8	25	2	1	2	5	63		BPI: Gold	Non-album single
"Powerful" (Major Lazer featuring Ellie Goulding and Tarrus Riley)	2015	54	7	30	64	78	90	77	20	53	83		BPI: Silver; ARIA: 2× Platinum; RIAA: Gold; RMNZ: Platinum	Peace Is the Mission
"Mama" (Clean Bandit featuring Ellie Goulding)	2019	98	—	—	—	—	—	97	—	—	—			What Is Love?
"Return to Love" (Andrea Bocelli featuring Ellie Goulding)	2019	—	—	—	—	—	—	—	—	—	—			Sì Forever (The Diamond Edition)
"Times Like These" (as part of Live Lounge Allstars)	2020	1	—	39	— (Note: "Times Like These" did not enter the Canadian Hot 100 Chart, but peaked at number eight on the Hot Canadian Digital Songs Chart.)	—	—	64	— (Note: "Times Like These" did not enter the NZ Top 40 Singles Chart, but peaked at number five on the NZ Hot Singles Chart.)	—	— (Note: "Times Like These" did not enter the Billboard Hot 100 Chart, but peaked at number 18 on the US Digital Songs Chart.)			Non-album singles
"New Love" (Silk City featuring Ellie Goulding)	2021	65	—	—	—	—	—	81	— (Note: "New Love" did not enter the NZ Top 40 Singles Chart, but peaked at number six on the NZ Hot Singles Chart.)	—	—			Non-album singles
"Hush" (Muse featuring Ellie Goulding)	2026	— (Note: "Hush" did not enter the UK Singles Chart, but it peaked at number 22 on the UK Rock & Metal Singles Chart.)	—	—	—	—	—	—	— (Note: "Hush" did not enter the NZ Top 40 Singles Chart, but it peaked at number 25 on the NZ Hot Singles Chart.)	—	—			The Wow! Signal
"—" denotes a recording that did not chart in that territory.

=== Promotional singles ===
List of promotional singles, with selected chart positions, showing year released and album name
Title	Year	Peak chart positions					Certifications	Album
Title	Year	UK	AUS	BEL (FL) Tip	IRE	SWE	Certifications	Album
"Wish I Stayed"	2009	—	—	—	—	—		Lights
"Hanging On" (featuring Tinie Tempah)	2012	144	—	—	—	—	RIAA: Gold	Halcyon
"You My Everything"	2013	—	—	—	—	—		Halcyon Days
"Fall into the Sky" (Zedd and Lucky Date featuring Ellie Goulding)	2014	—	—	63	—	—		Clarity
"Lost and Found"	2015	57	70	—	75	89		Delirium
"Fields of Gold"	2022	—	—	—	—	—		Songbook for Christmas
"Cure for Love"	2023	—	—	—	—	—		Higher Than Heaven
"Higher Than Heaven"	2023	—	—	—	—	—		Higher Than Heaven
"Love Goes On"	2023	—	—	—	—	—		Higher Than Heaven
"Midnight Dreams"	2023	— (Note: "Midnight Dreams" did not enter the UK Singles Chart Top 100, but peaked at number 98 on the UK Singles Downloads Chart Top 100.)	—	—	—	—		Higher Than Heaven
"Better Man"	2023	—	—	—	—	—		Higher Than Heaven
"—" denotes a recording that did not chart in that territory.

== Other charted and certified songs ==
List of songs, with selected chart positions and certifications, showing year released and album name
Title	Year	Peaks		Certifications	Album
Title	Year	UK	NZ	Certifications	Album
"Human"	2010	155	—		Bright Lights
"Little Dreams"	2010	183	—		Bright Lights
"Home"	2010	189	—		Bright Lights
"My Blood"	2012	—	—	BPI: Silver	Halcyon
"Only You"	2012	—	37		Halcyon
"Keep On Dancin'"	2015	192	—		Delirium
"Don't Want Your Love" (with Illenium)	2026	—	— (Note: "Don't Want Your Love" did not enter the NZ Top 40 Singles Chart, but peaked at number 30 on the NZ Hot Singles Chart.)		Odyssey
"—" denotes a recording that did not chart in that territory.

== Songwriting credits ==
Goulding has been covered by recording artists, as well she has co-written for a number of artists, including:

- †: indicates a cover of a recorded Ellie Goulding song.

List of songs written by Ellie Goulding for/with other artists, showing year released and album name
Artist	Song	Year	Album	Credits	Ref.
Diana Vickers	"Remake Me & You"	2010	Songs from the Tainted Cherry Tree	Composer	
Diana Vickers	"Notice"	2010	Songs from the Tainted Cherry Tree	Composer	
Diana Vickers	"Jumping Into Rivers"	2010	Songs from the Tainted Cherry Tree	Composer	
Gabriella Cilmi	"Love Me Cos You Want To"	2010	Ten	Composer	
Lena	"Not Following"	2010	My Cassette Player	Composer	
Lena	"Who'd Want To Find Love"	2011	Good News (Platin Edition)	Composer	
Vera Blue (as Celia Pavey)	"Believe Me" †	2013	This Music	Composer	
Beth	"I Need Your Love" †	2016	Love Songs	Composer	
Through Fire	"Lights" †	2016	Breathe	Composer	
Omar Rodríguez-López	"Lights" †	2016	Blind Worms, Pious Swine	Composer	
Lea Michele	"Heavenly"	2017	Places	Composer	
Raffey Cassidy	"Burn" †	2017	The Killing of a Sacred Deer (Original Motion Picture Soundtrack)	Composer	
Hailee Steinfeld and BloodPop®	"Capital Letters"	2018	Fifty Shades Freed (Original Motion Picture Soundtrack)	Composer	
Elle Fanning	"Lights" †	2019	Teen Spirit (Original Motion Picture Soundtrack)	Composer	
Afrojack and David Guetta	"Hero"	2021	Non-album single	Composer	
George FitzGerald	"Cold"	2022	Stellar Drifting	Composer	
Starsmith	"Leave Me Slowly"	2024	Non-album single	Composer	

== Music videos ==
List of music videos, showing year released and directors
Title	Year	Director(s)	Ref.
"Under the Sheets"	2009	Lennox Brothers	
"Starry Eyed"	2010	OneInThree	
"Guns and Horses"	2010	Petro	
"The Writer"	2010	Chris Cottam	
"Your Song"	2010	Ben Coughlan and Max Knight	
"Wonderman" (Tinie Tempah featuring Ellie Goulding)	2011	Robert Hales	
"Lights"	2011	Sophie Muller	
"Starry Eyed" (US version)	2011	Dugan O'Neal	
"Hanging On" (featuring Tinie Tempah)	2012	Ben Newbury	
"Anything Could Happen"	2012	Floria Sigismondi	
"I Know You Care"	2012	Ben Coughlan	
"Figure 8"	2012	W.I.Z.	
"Summit" (Skrillex featuring Ellie Goulding)	2013	Pilerats	
"Explosions"	2013	Yuliya Miroshnikova	
"I Need Your Love" (Calvin Harris featuring Ellie Goulding)	2013	Emil Nava	
"Tessellate"	2013	Ben Newbury	
"Burn"	2013	Mike Sharpe	
"Midas Touch" (with Burns)	2013	Samuel Stephenson	
"How Long Will I Love You" (About Time version)	2013	Mike Sharpe	
"How Long Will I Love You" (Tom & Issy version)	2013	Roger Michell	
"In My City" (Halcyon Days North America Tour Video)	2013	Conor McDonnell	
"Goodness Gracious"	2014	Kinga Burza	
"Under Control" (Halcyon Days UK Tour Video)	2014	Conor McDonnell	
"Beating Heart"	2014	Ben Newbury	
"Outside" (Calvin Harris featuring Ellie Goulding)	2014	Emil Nava	
"Do They Know It's Christmas?" (as part of Band Aid 30)	2014	Andy Morahan	
"Love Me like You Do"	2015	Georgia Hudson	
"Powerful" (Major Lazer featuring Ellie Goulding and Tarrus Riley)	2015	James Slater	
"On My Mind"	2015	Emil Nava	
"Army"	2016	Conor McDonnell	
"Something in the Way You Move"	2016	Ed Coleman	
"Still Falling for You"	2016	Emil Nava	
"First Time" (with Kygo)	2017	Mathew Cullen	
"Something in the Way You Move" (version two)	2017	Emil Nava	
"Close to Me" (with Diplo featuring Swae Lee)	2018	Diane Martel	
"Do You Remember" (from Fighting with My Family)	2019	Stephen Merchant	
"Mama" (Clean Bandit featuring Ellie Goulding)	2019	Clean Bandit	
"Flux"	2019	Rhianne White	
"In This Together" (with Steven Price)	2019	Silverback Films	
"Sixteen"	2019	Tim Mattia	
"Hate Me" (with Juice Wrld)	2019	Saam Farahmand	
"Return to Love" (Andrea Bocelli featuring Ellie Goulding)	2019	Luca Scota	
"River"	2019	David Soutar	
"Worry About Me" (featuring Blackbear)	2020	Emil Nava	
"Power"	2020	Imogen Snell and Riccardo Castano	
"Love I'm Given"	2020	Rianne White	
"New Love" (Silk City featuring Ellie Goulding)	2021	Ana Sting	
"Easy Lover" (featuring Big Sean)	2022	Sophia Ray	
"All By Myself" (with Alok and Sigala)	2022	Monica G. Carter	
"Let It Die"	2022	Maya Dufeu	
"Like a Saviour"	2023	Joe Connor	
"Better Man"	2023	Tom Sandford	
"Miracle" (with Calvin Harris)	2023	Taz Tron Delix	
"Somebody" (with TSHA and Gregory Porter)	2023	Nicole Ngai	
"Free" (with Calvin Harris)	2024	Conor McDonnell	
"I Adore You" (with J Balvin, Hugel, Topic, Arash and Daecolm)	2024	Jannis Döring	
"Hypnotized" (with Anyma)	2025	Tobias Gremmler	
"Save My Love" (with Marshmello and AVAION)	2025	Ian Lipton	
"Destiny"	2025	Floria Sigismondi	
"Don't Want Your Love" (with Illenium)	2026	Baby	
"Ravers"	2026	Sean Price Williams	

== See also ==
- List of songs recorded by Ellie Goulding
