= Electricity (Silk City and Dua Lipa song) =

2018 single by Silk City and Dua Lipa

Single by Silk City and Dua Lipa (Note: Dua Lipa is credited as a lead artist on the single and album versions of "Electricity"; she is credited as a featured artist on the acoustic version and remixes. Diplo and Mark Ronson are credited as featured artists on the single and MK remix of "Electricity"; they are credited as lead artists on the acoustic version as well as the Black Madonna, Ten Ven and Alex Metric remixes.)

from the EP Electricity
- Released: 6 September 2018
- Recorded: March 2018
- Studio: Zelig West (Los Angeles); Lazer Sound (Beachwood Canyon, California)
- Genre: Dance-pop; house
- Length: 3:58
- Label: Columbia; Sony
- Songwriters: Mark Ronson; Thomas Wesley Pentz; Diana Gordon; Romy Madley Croft; Dua Lipa; Philip Meckseper; Jacob Olofsson; Rami Dawod; Maxime Picard; Clément Picard
- Producer: Silk City

Silk City singles chronology
"Loud" (2018)	"Electricity" (2018)	"New Love" (2021)

Dua Lipa singles chronology
"One Kiss" (2018)	"Electricity" (2018)	"Swan Song" (2019)

Music video
- "Electricity" on YouTube

"Electricity" is a song by British-American music duo Silk City and English singer Dua Lipa. The song was written by Silk City members: Mark Ronson and Diplo, alongside Lipa, Diana Gordon, Romy Madley Croft, Jr Blender, Maxime Picard, Clément Picard, Jacob Olofsson and Rami Dawod. The production was handled by Silk City with additional production from Picard Brothers, Jarami, Riton, Alex Metric, and Blender. It was released for digital download and streaming through Columbia Records and Sony Music on 6 September 2018 as the fourth single from Silk City's debut 2019 extended play (EP) of the same name. The song was later included on Dua Lipa: Complete Edition (2018), the super deluxe reissue of Lipa's eponymous debut studio album.

Musically, "Electricity" draws from Chicago house and 1990s music, and includes elements of disco-house, diva house and electropop. It is a dance-pop and piano house song that lyrically sees a couple who has found a kindred spirit, with one party also comforting the other. Several music critics commended Silk City's production as well as its lyrics. It won the Grammy Award for Best Dance Recording at the 61st Annual Grammy Awards and appeared on year-end lists from publications including Billboard, The New York Times and Popjustice. The song reached number 4 and 62 respectively on the UK Singles Chart and US Billboard Hot 100, and has a platinum certification in both countries.

The music video for "Electricity" was directed by Bradley & Pablo, and is set during the Northeast blackout of 2003. In the video, Lipa throws a party in her loft, where she turns the power back on with her dance moves, while Ronson and Diplo get stuck in an elevator. Critics praised Lipa's performance in the video. The song was also accompanied by a vertical video and dance video. Silk City and Lipa promoted the song with numerous live performances, including ones at the American Music Awards of 2018, Jimmy Kimmel Live!, and Dick Clark's New Year's Rockin' Eve. The song has received several remixes, including ones by the Black Madonna and MK.

== Writing and production ==
"Electricity" was written by Mark Ronson and Diplo of Silk City, Dua Lipa, Diana Gordon, Romy Madley Croft of The xx, Jr Blender, Jarami members Jacob Olofsson and Rami Dawod, and Maxime and Clément Picard. The song was produced by Silk City with Picard Brothers, Jarami, Riton, Alex Metric, and Blender handling additional production. The song began as a project between Ronson and Diplo, intending for it to have a Chicago house and vintage US house vibe. The first thing they did in the studio was write piano lines before Diplo made a beat under it; however, they had trouble finding the direction of the sound, calling upon nearly a dozen friends for assistance. The song took over two months to complete, going from a club song to a radio song.

Gordon came up with the melody, which jump-started the song, while Blender came up with the catchy chorus, which was unable to work for an entire song. Gordon ended up recording the melody in a demo. English singer Florence Welch of Florence and the Machine wrote and recorded an entire song to the record, called "Baptize", which demo leaked in 2020, but it did not fit, so they decided to keep her electricity concept and re-write it. Croft helped with the re-writes, writing the entire lead, and filling in some parts. After the many contributions, Diplo and Ronson were unsure of who they wanted to sing on it. They ultimately sent a demo to Lipa in November 2017, who expressed her admiration of it. Lipa ended up re-writing some parts and lowering the key to fit with her voice. She co-wrote the middle eight with Ronson. Ronson handled her vocal production and tracked her. The writers spent a lot of time perfecting the lyrics.

Diplo and Ronson had trouble with the production as they are not inherently house producers. They asked Metric and Riton for help as they are "very current" with house music in the United Kingdom. Diplo and Ronson knew they needed Metric and Riton in order to be authentic. Metric and Riton helped them with the drums and the arrangement. The Picard Brothers created the bassline using an old 909 machine. Ronson made the track sound vintage while Diplo incorporated disparate genres. Ronson tried the production several different ways, including having a band come into the studio and record it in a disco style. They ended up using this rendition as the song's outro. They accidentally played Gordon's demo in the lower key and decided to place it as an "answer" to Lipa's vocals. Gordon was not singing any lyrics in the demo so they had her re-record her vocals with the updated lyrics. They then slowed down her vocals. The song was recorded in March 2018 at Zelig West Studios in Los Angeles and Lazer Sound Studios in Beachwood Canyon, Los Angeles. Mixing was handled by Josh Gudwin at Henson Recording Studios in Los Angeles with Chris Gehringer mastering the song at Sterling Sound in New York City.

== Music and lyrics ==
"Electricity"
A dance-pop and piano house track set to retro-pop production with electronic beats and disco strings, "Electricity" is about a couple who have found a kindred spirit.

Musically, "Electricity" is a dance-pop and piano house song. (Note: Sources labeling "Electricity" a dance-pop song: Dancing Astronaut, Spin and Variety.; Sources labeling "Electricity" a piano house song: Apple Music, Billboard, The Guardian and The Face.) Running for 3 minutes and 58 seconds, the song follows a structure of verse, bridge, chorus, verse, bridge, chorus, middle eight, chorus, outro and is composed in 4/4 time and the key of D minor, with a tempo of 118 beats per minute. It follows a chord progression of Dm–F–Dm–C, while the bridge adds additional B♭maj7 and Am7 chords. The song additionally draws from Chicago house and 1990s music, and incorporates elements of disco-house, diva house and electropop genres.

"Electricity" uses a retro-pop production, that consists of house drums, piano-driven beats, a modern heavy-handed bassline, an electric groove, Latin melodies, plunging synths, high pitched disco synth strings, slithering guitars, and soulful house piano stabs. The song also features a 1960s soul outro. Lipa uses warped gospel house vocals, ranging one octave from A_{3} to A_{4}, while also making use of belting. Lyrically, the song documents a relationship where the two people feel as though they've found a kindred spirit, with one also comforting the other who has been through a traumatic relationship in the past. It was also thought to be about self-love due to Lipa singing as though she is duetting with herself in the chorus.

== Release and promotion ==
In July 2018, Ronson confirmed that Silk City had a collaboration with Dua Lipa coming, and he announced the title as "Electricity." Ronson and Lipa began teasing the song shortly thereafter. On 25 August 2018, Lipa confirmed the song's release date and on 4 September of that year, Ronson, Lipa, and Diplo formally announced the track. "Electricity" was released on 6 September 2018 for digital download and streaming through Columbia Records and Sony Music. The song was serviced to contemporary hit radio formats in the United States on 11 September while it was sent for radio airplay in Italy on 21 September. The song was included as the fifth track on the second disc of the super deluxe edition of Lipa's eponymous debut album, Dua Lipa: Complete Edition, released through Warner Bros. Records on 19 October 2018. It was also included as the opening track of Silk City's 12-inch vinyl EP of the same name, released 13 April 2019 as part of Record Store Day 2019.

Several alternate versions of "Electricity" have been released. On 19 October 2018, an acoustic version was released. On 26 October of that year, the song's first remix was released, being by the Black Madonna (now known as the Blessed Madonna). Categorized as a blend of club, house, soul and techno with Chicago house vibes, the remix increases the tempo of the original and includes rhythmic, old-school keys, and a four on the floor drum pattern production-wise. On 2 November of that year, a club remix by Ten Ven was released. A week later and on 16 November, remixes by MK and Alex Metric were released. The Alex Metric remix reimagines the song as a disco house track, with groovy bongos, funk-driven basslines, and cowbells.

== Critical reception ==
In Rolling Stone, Daniela Tijerina viewed the song as a "riled up dancefloor smash" and praised it for being Lipa's best collaboration. Billboard's David Rishty complimented Lipa for her vocals, which he thought turned the track's listeners into dancers, as well as calling the song a "supercharged groover." Of the same magazine, Kat Bein labelled it "one of the year's most instantly lovable house hooks." The magazine ranked it as 2018's 48th best song as well as the year's 6th best dance/electronic Song. Pryor Stroud of PopMatters praised the propulsive chorus and noted that it "[breaks] out of the track's four walls and [runs] free." The song placed at number 59 on the magazine's 2018 year-end list, while it placed at number 29 for The New York Times. Popjustice named it 2018's 11th best song and it placed at number 12 on the year-end list of Stereogum. The song was nominated for the 2019 Popjustice £20 Music Prize.

For The Line of Best Fit, Cerys Kenneally commended the anthemic pop abilities, while MTV pointed out its house vibes, reminiscent of the 1990s. In his review for The Guardian, Kate Solomon viewed it as "a bop with a capital B" and a "90s piano-house dream." Writing for Spin, Anna Gaca complimented the "warm and familiar" pianos and the arrangement that showcases Lipa's husky vocals. She concluded by labelling it a "slinky dance ballad." Idolator's Mike Nied complimented the "emphatic" and "infectious" chorus, as well as calling the lyrics "infatuated." In his Crack Magazine review for Lipa's Future Nostalgia, Michael Cragg commended the track for going into the backbone of the album, expressing that it released something in her. "Electricity" won the Grammy Award for Best Dance Recording at the 2019 ceremony. The song received nominations for Best Pop/Electronic Song at the 2019 International Dance Music Awards and Global Hit of the Year at the 2019 MTV Millennial Awards.

== Commercial performance ==
In the United Kingdom, "Electricity" debuted at number 15 on the UK Singles Chart issue dated 14 September 2018. Three weeks later, it peaked at number 4 on the chart and spent a total of 20 weeks on the chart. Similarly, the song reached number 6 in Ireland and 8 in Scotland. In July 2019, it was certified double platinum by the British Phonographic Industry (BPI) for track-equivalent sales of 1,200,000 units. "Electricity" reached number 6 on the Euro Digital Song Sales chart. The song had respective peaks of number 6 and 17 in the Flanders and Wallonia regions of Belgium. On their dance charts, it reached number 1 and 6 in the regions, respectively. The song was certified gold in the country by the Belgian Entertainment Association (BEA) for selling 20,000 track-equivalent units. The song additionally reached number 149 in France and 56 in Italy. It holds a gold certification in both countries.

In the United States, "Electricity" spent a total of 10 non-consecutive weeks on the Billboard Hot 100. In September 2018, the song debuted at number 96 and reached a peak of 62 the following January. It was awarded a platinum certification from the Recording Industry Association of America (RIAA) for selling 1,000,000 track-equivalent units in the country. It additionally reached the summit of the Dance Club Songs chart and number five on the Dance/Electronic Songs chart. In Canada, the song was certified gold by Music Canada and reached number 61 on the Canadian Singles Chart. In Australia, the song was awarded a platinum certification from the Australian Recording Industry Association (ARIA) for selling 70,000 track-equivalent units. It reached number 22 on the country's singles chart and number 6 on their dance music chart. The song also peaked at number 25 in New Zealand.

== Music video ==
=== Background and release ===
The music video for "Electricity" accompanied the single's release. It was directed by Bradley & Pablo and filmed at ODR Studios in Newark, New Jersey. Lipa called it a "turning point," stating that it was the first video where she did not care about what people thought and she just wanted to dance, perform, and enjoy herself. She went on to say it helped with her confidence and she was very proud of it. The song was also accompanied by a vertical video and dance video. The vertical video was released on 21 September 2018 and features Lipa wearing a leather bikini and dancing in a warehouse. The 1990s-inspired dance video released on 15 November 2018 and was directed and produced by Lindsey Mann. It features dancers in baggy clothes, going through the underground.

=== Synopsis ===
In the music video, Dua Lipa dances in a loft during the Northeast blackout of 2003, while Diplo and Mark Ronson get stuck in an elevator.

The visual is set during the Northeast blackout of 2003, opening with home-video style footage from the time, starting with sirens going off in the street, before a man mentions the blackout, and is cut off by a reporter talking about how the luminous skyscrapers are now shadows. It then pans to Lipa listening to the radio in a dark New York City loft. She is noticeably sweaty, wearing red high-waisted bottoms, a white t-shirt tied around her chest, showing her abs, and layered necklaces, with blonde hair. Lipa then takes a sip from a jug of water and leans back in a chair, before she begins to sing and dance, with choreography inspired by Flashdance (1983). She gets up and twirls around her desk, while the lamps in the loft flicker as she heads for the refrigerator.

As Lipa dances, she kicks her legs up on a couch, eventually turning on the electricity with her dance moves, and drawing people in with her flickering lights and energy, beginning with two men. Ronson and Diplo are seen getting on an elevator and pushing the button, before the elevator shakes, and they get stuck. Lipa's party escalates to where a crowd of people, who shine their flashlights, join her in her now luminous loft. The video then fast-forwards to the next morning, where several people lie on the floor, with a woman playing the keyboards, and a man playing the drums. Lipa sits on a chair and opens her eyes. The visual closes with another clip of Ronson and Diplo in the dark broken elevator, with Ronson using a flashlight.

=== Reception ===
The music video for "Electricity" was met with critical acclaim, with many praising Lipa's performance. In Billboard, John Ochoa viewed the video as "steamy" and commended Lipa for "tearing up a sweaty summer loft party." For Refinery29, Courtney E. Smith praised Lipa for listening to her criticism for her lack of stage presence. Ali Webb of L'Officiel complimented the video's "removal of literal electricity," allowing the "movement and connection to shine," while praising the "minimalism and maximalism, intimacy and emptiness" aesthetic. She concluded by calling it a reminder that "human connection is more powerful than any light."

Stereogum's Tom Breihan labelled the loft "cavernous" and the dancers "attractive strangers." Writing for Spin, Isabella Castro-Cota stated Lipa is "quite literally electric." In his review for MTV, Patrick Hoksen complimented Lipa's newly blonde hair and thought that she "steals the video." Sarah Brown of Soundigest viewed the "Electricity" video as a "burst of energy" and "trilling," as well as praising Ronson and Diplo's "comedic" cameo appearance. The video was nominated for the MTV Video Music Award for Best Dance Video at the 2019 MTV Video Music Awards.

== Live performances ==
After its release, "Electricity" was added to the setlists of the remaining shows for Lipa's Self-Titled Tour. From 2018 to 2020, the song was a part of her setlists for the iHeartRadio Music Festival 2018, Jingle Ball 2018, Dick Clark's New Year's Rockin' Eve 2019, the amfAR Gala 2019, the Amazon Prime Day concert 2019, the OnePlus Music Festival 2019, and the Sydney Gay and Lesbian Mardi Gras 2020. Lipa performed the song at the American Music Awards of 2018, as a medley with "One Kiss" (2018) on 9 October 2018. The stage was designed as a dimly lit urban loft studio, where Lipa performed with a dance team. Two days later, she performed it on Jimmy Kimmel Live!, backed by a bassist, a keyboardist, a drummer and two backup singers. She wore a sparkly silver dress, and danced bare foot. Lipa performed "Electricity" with Kylie Minogue on 27 November 2020 in her livestream concert, Studio 2054. Lipa also included the song on the setlist of her 2022 Future Nostalgia Tour.

Silk City performed "Electricity" for the first and only time together on 13 October 2018 at the Treasure Island Music Festival. Mark Ronson performed solo versions of the song in 2019 at BBC Radio 1's Big Weekend and Capital FM's Summertime Ball, while Diplo performed it at the Electric Daisy Carnival of that year in Las Vegas.

== Track listings ==
- Digital download and streaming
1. "Electricity" (featuring Diplo and Mark Ronson) – 3:58
- Digital download and streaming – acoustic version
1. "Electricity" (featuring Dua Lipa) [acoustic] – 4:13
- Digital download and streaming – The Black Madonna remix
1. "Electricity" (featuring Dua Lipa) [The Black Madonna remix] – 4:58
- Digital download and streaming – Ten Ven remix
1. "Electricity" (featuring Dua Lipa) [Ten Ven remix] – 4:22
- Digital download and streaming – MK remix
1. "Electricity" (featuring Diplo, Dua Lipa and Mark Ronson) [MK remix] – 5:46
- Digital download and streaming – Alex Metric remix
1. "Electricity" (featuring Dua Lipa) [Alex Metric remix] – 6:20

== Personnel ==
- Silk City – production
  - Thomas Wesley Pentz – instrumentation, programming
  - Mark Ronson – instrumentation, programming
- Dua Lipa – vocals
- The Picard Brothers – additional production
  - Maxime Picard – instrumentation, programming
  - Clément Picard – instrumentation, programming
- Jarami – additional production
  - Jacob Olofsson – instrumentation, programming
  - Rami Dawod – programming
- Riton – additional production
- Alex Metric – additional production
- Jr Blender – additional production, instrumentation, programming
- Josh Gudwin – mixing
- Hunter Jackson – mixing assistance
- Chris Gehringer – mastering
- Will Quinnell – mastering assistance

== Charts ==
=== Weekly charts ===
Weekly chart positions for "Electricity"
Chart (2018–2019)	Peak position
Argentina (Argentina Hot 100)	88
Australia (ARIA)	22
Australia Dance (ARIA)	6
Austria (Ö3 Austria Top 40)	61
Belgium (Ultratop 50 Flanders)	6
Belgium Dance (Ultratop Flanders)	1
Belgium (Ultratop 50 Wallonia)	17
Belgium Dance (Ultratop Wallonia)	6
Bolivia (Monitor Latino)	11
Canada Hot 100 (Billboard)	61
CIS Airplay (TopHit)	71
Colombia (National-Report)	47
Croatia International Airplay (HRT)	3
Czech Republic Singles Digital (ČNS IFPI)	18
Euro Digital Song Sales (Billboard)	6
France (SNEP)	149
Germany (GfK)	64
Greece International Digital Singles (IFPI)	21
Hungary (Rádiós Top 40)	4
Hungary (Single Top 40)	23
Hungary (Stream Top 40)	13
Ireland (IRMA)	6
Israel (Media Forest)	2
Italy (FIMI)	56
Japan Hot 100 (Billboard)	78
Lebanon (Lebanese Top 20)	9
Lithuania (AGATA)	7
Mexico (Billboard Mexican Airplay)	16
Netherlands (Dutch Top 40)	5
Netherlands (Single Top 100)	13
New Zealand (Recorded Music NZ)	25
Norway (VG-lista)	40
Poland Airplay (ZPAV)	44
Portugal (AFP)	29
Romania (Airplay 100)	44
Russia Airplay (Tophit)	80
Scotland Singles (OCC)	8
Singapore (RIAS)	19
Slovakia Airplay (ČNS IFPI)	27
Slovakia Singles Digital (ČNS IFPI)	13
Slovenia (SloTop50)	13
Spain (Promusicae)	53
Sweden (Sverigetopplistan)	51
Switzerland (Schweizer Hitparade)	46
UK Singles (OCC)	4
US Billboard Hot 100	62
US Dance Club Songs (Billboard)	1
US Hot Dance/Electronic Songs (Billboard)	5
US Pop Airplay (Billboard)	16
Venezuela Airplay (National-Report)	10

=== Year-end charts ===
2018 year-end chart positions for "Electricity"
Chart (2018)	Position
Belgium (Ultratop Flanders)	61
Netherlands (Dutch Top 40)	47
Netherlands (Single Top 100)	93
Portugal Full Track Download (AFP)	196
US Hot Dance/Electronic Songs (Billboard)	24

2019 year-end chart positions for "Electricity"
Chart (2019)	Position
Belgium (Ultratop Flanders)	75
Hungary (Rádiós Top 40)	45
US Hot Dance/Electronic Songs (Billboard)	13

== Certifications ==
Certifications and sales for "Electricity"
Region	Certification	Certified units/sales
Australia (ARIA)	Platinum	70,000^{‡}
Belgium (BRMA)	Gold	20,000^{‡}
Canada (Music Canada)	Gold	40,000^{‡}
Denmark (IFPI Danmark)	Gold	45,000^{‡}
France (SNEP)	Gold	100,000^{‡}
Italy (FIMI)	Gold	25,000^{‡}
Mexico (AMPROFON)	3× Platinum+Gold	210,000^{‡}
New Zealand (RMNZ)	2× Platinum	60,000^{‡}
Poland (ZPAV)	Platinum	20,000^{‡}
Spain (Promusicae)	Platinum	60,000^{‡}
United Kingdom (BPI)	2× Platinum	1,200,000^{‡}
United States (RIAA)	Platinum	1,000,000^{‡}
^{‡} Sales+streaming figures based on certification alone.

== Release history ==
Release dates and formats for "Electricity"
Region	Date	Format	Version	Label	Ref.
Various	6 September 2018	Digital download; streaming	Original	Columbia; Sony	
United States	11 September 2018	Contemporary hit radio	Original	Columbia	
Italy	21 September 2018	Radio airplay	Original	Sony	
Various	19 October 2018	Digital download; streaming	Acoustic	Columbia; Sony	
Various	26 October 2018	Digital download; streaming	The Black Madonna remix	Columbia; Sony	
Various	2 November 2018	Digital download; streaming	Ten Ven remix	Columbia; Sony	
Various	9 November 2018	Digital download; streaming	MK remix	Columbia; Sony	
Various	16 November 2018	Digital download; streaming	Alex Metric remix	Columbia; Sony	

== See also ==
- List of UK top-ten singles in 2018
- List of Billboard Dance Club Songs number ones of 2018
