= Love I'm Given =

Single from Ellie Goulding

Single by Ellie Goulding

from the album Brightest Blue
- Released: 19 August 2020
- Genre: Soul
- Length: 3:29
- Label: Polydor
- Songwriters: Ellie Goulding; Joe Kearns; Jim Eliot
- Producers: Kearns; Eliot; Mike Wise

Ellie Goulding singles chronology
"Slow Grenade" (2020)	"Love I'm Given" (2020)	"New Love" (2021)

Music video
- "Love I'm Given" on YouTube

"Love I'm Given" is a song by the English singer-songwriter Ellie Goulding, released as the fourth single from Goulding's fourth studio album Brightest Blue, through Polydor Records on 19 August 2020. It was written by Ellie Goulding, Joe Kearns and Jim Eliot.

== Background ==
"Love I’m Given is about accepting and being at peace with all the mistakes in your life and realizing you get the same love back you give out. The video represents the fight between calm and chaos. The Boxing ring is weirdly the place I feel the most pure and in control and the moments gold dress represent getting to a place of ultimate power when you know you are in the most powerful place you can be when you have that kind of revaluation about love and forgiveness."

— Goulding, "Ellie Goulding Unveils Stunning New Music Video For ‘Love I’m Given’", ET Canada

== Music video ==
A music video to accompany the release of "Love I'm Given" was first released onto YouTube on 19 August 2020. The video shows Goulding inside a boxing ring during lockdown. The video was directed by Rianne White, who also directed the video for "Flux".

== Personnel ==
Credits adapted from Tidal.

- Jim Eliot – Producer, composer, lyricist
- Joe Kearns – Producer, composer, lyricist, recording engineer, studio personnel
- Mike Wise – Producer, associated performer, bass guitar, drums, guitar, organ, piano, programming, synthesizer programming
- Ellie Goulding – Composer, lyricist, associated performer, vocals
- Zach Bines – Associated performer, vocals
- Manny Park – Asst. Recording Engineer, studio personnel
- Matt Colton – Mastering Engineer, studio personnel
- John Hanes – Mix Engineer, studio personnel
- Serban Ghenea – Mixer, studio personnel
- Jason Elliott – Recording Engineer, studio personnel

== Charts ==
Chart (2020)	Peak position
New Zealand Hot Singles (RMNZ)	31

== Release history ==
Region	Date	Format	Label
Various	19 August 2020	Digital download; streaming	Polydor
