= Sixteen (Ellie Goulding song) =

2019 song by Ellie Goulding

Single by Ellie Goulding
- Released: 12 April 2019
- Genre: Pop; EDM; dance-pop
- Length: 3:21
- Label: Polydor
- Songwriters: Elena Goulding; Joe Kearns; Rachel Keen; Fred Gibson
- Producers: Mike Wise; Fred

Ellie Goulding singles chronology
"Close to Me" (Red Velvet remix) (2019)	"Sixteen" (2019)	"Hate Me" (2019)

Music video
- "Sixteen" on YouTube

"Sixteen" is a song by English singer Ellie Goulding, released as a single through Polydor Records on 12 April 2019. It appears as an international bonus track on the digital and streaming edition of her fourth studio album Brightest Blue. It was co-written by Goulding with Raye and Fred, and produced by Ian Kirkpatrick, Fred and Mike Wise. Goulding has said the song is about the "reckless days of adolescence".

== Composition ==
"Sixteen" is a pop, EDM and dance-pop ballad with an electronic beat that speaks about the "reckless days of adolescence". It is written in the key of A-flat major with a tempo of 110 beats per minute.

== Promotion ==
Goulding announced the song on social media on 11 April 2019, also posting that she compiled the cover artwork from friends' photos of when they were sixteen years of age.

== Music video ==
The music video directed by Tim Mattia was released on April 17, 2019, reflecting on Goulding's teenage years, focusing on her and a friend bunking off school to steal alcohol, smoke cannabis, get tattoos, and meet boys at an arcade.

== Track listing ==
Digital download
No.	Title	Length
1.	"Sixteen"	3:21

Digital download
No.	Title	Length
1.	"Sixteen" (Don Diablo Remix)	3:13

Digital download
No.	Title	Length
1.	"Sixteen" (99 Souls Remix)	3:32

Digital download
No.	Title	Length
1.	"Sixteen" (Acoustic)	3:09

== Charts ==
Chart (2019)	Peak position
Australia (ARIA)	85
Austria (Ö3 Austria Top 40)	41
Belgium (Ultratop 50 Flanders)	50
Belgium (Ultratip Bubbling Under Wallonia)	35
Canadian Hot Digital Songs (Billboard)	44
China Airplay/FL (Billboard)	16
Czech Republic Singles Digital (ČNS IFPI)	57
Germany (GfK)	64
Ireland (IRMA)	20
Lithuania (AGATA)	35
Netherlands (Dutch Top 40)	27
New Zealand Hot Singles (RMNZ)	8
Norway (VG-lista)	26
Scottish Singles Sales (Official Charts)	10
Slovakia Airplay (ČNS IFPI)	16
Slovakia Singles Digital (ČNS IFPI)	52
Sweden (Sverigetopplistan)	37
Switzerland (Schweizer Hitparade)	95
UK Singles (Official Charts)	21
Ukraine Airplay (TopHit)	30

== Certifications ==
Region	Certification	Certified units/sales
Brazil (Pro-Música Brasil)	Platinum	40,000^{‡}
New Zealand (RMNZ)	Gold	15,000^{‡}
Poland (ZPAV)	Gold	10,000^{‡}
Portugal (AFP)	Gold	5,000^{‡}
United Kingdom (BPI)	Gold	400,000^{‡}
United States (RIAA)	Gold	500,000^{‡}
^{‡} Sales+streaming figures based on certification alone.

== Release history ==
Region	Date	Format	Version	Label	Ref.
Various	12 April 2019	Digital download; streaming	Original	Polydor	
Italy	12 April 2019	Contemporary hit radio	Original	Universal	
United Kingdom	12 April 2019	Contemporary hit radio	Original	Polydor	
Various	10 May 2019	Digital download; streaming	Don Diablo Remix	Polydor	
Various	31 May 2019	Digital download; streaming	99 Souls Remix	Polydor	
Various	14 June 2019	Digital download; streaming	Acoustic	Polydor	
