= Brightest Blue =

2020 studio album by Ellie Goulding

- Digital album cover (Note: Physical editions feature artist name, while Target edition features alternate colours.)

Studio album by Ellie Goulding
- Released: 17 July 2020
- Recorded: 2017–2020
- Genre: Pop
- Length: 56:35
- Label: Polydor
- Producers: Jonny Coffer; Max Cooke; Diplo; Jason Evigan; Forest Swords; Ilya; Joe Kearns; The Monsters and the Strangerz; OzGo; Jamie Scott; Starsmith; Eli Teplin; Watt; Patrick Wimberly

Ellie Goulding chronology
Delirium (2015)	Brightest Blue (2020)	Brightest Blue: Music for Calm (2021)

EG.0
- Side B cover

Singles from Brightest Blue
- 1. "Worry About Me" Released: 13 March 2020; 2. "Power" Released: 21 May 2020; 3. "Slow Grenade" Released: 30 June 2020; 4. "Love I'm Given" Released: 19 August 2020

Brightest Blue is the fourth studio album by English singer-songwriter Ellie Goulding, released on 17 July 2020 by Polydor Records. Originally scheduled for 5 June 2020, the album's release was delayed due to the COVID-19 pandemic. The album was preceded by three singles: "Worry About Me", "Power" and "Slow Grenade", and features guest vocals from Blackbear, Diplo, Juice Wrld, Lauv, serpentwithfeet and Swae Lee. It is Goulding's first album since Delirium (2015).

Brightest Blue received generally positive reviews from music critics. The album was also a commercial success. It became Goulding's third album to peak at number one on the UK Albums Chart and fourth album to debut inside the top three on the chart. The album also peaked inside the top ten in several other countries. To promote the album, Goulding was set to embark on the Brightest Blue Tour on 28 April 2021, but it was pushed back to 5 October 2021 due to COVID-19 restrictions in the United Kingdom.

== Background ==
In January 2017, Goulding announced that work on new music had begun. In April of the same year, producer BloodPop revealed on social media he was in the studio with Goulding. That same month, Goulding released a collaboration with Kygo entitled "First Time". On 24 October 2018, she released "Close to Me" with Diplo and Swae Lee. She told The Guardian in early 2019, "It's very much written by me." She further discussed three new songs: "Flux", "Love I'm Given" and "Electricity". "Flux" was released on 1 March of the same year.

In July 2019, Goulding stated that her next material to be released would be the songs "Woman I Am" and "Start". In November, she released her rendition of Joni Mitchell's Christmas song "River", which topped the UK Singles Chart, becoming her third UK number-one single and the last UK number one song of the 2010s. In a March 2020 interview with Heart, Goulding revealed that the album "kind of comes in two parts," adding that she plays the guitar, bass and piano on the project. During an appearance on The Late Late Show with James Corden, she described the album as having two sides, revealing that the first side will features songs written entirely by her, while the second is described as being "like an alter ego" and contains the majority of singles released from 2018 to 2020.

== Release and promotion ==
On 27 May 2020, Goulding announced Brightest Blue as the album's title, alongside its cover artwork, release dates and formats, and track listing. The album's pre-order was made alongside the announcement. The first side, Brightest Blue, features 13 total tracks, while the second EG.0, features the previously released "Close to Me", "Hate Me" and "Worry About Me", as well as two new tracks. Originally scheduled for release on 5 June 2020, it was later delayed to 12 June, and later to 17 July of the same year. On 13 July of the same year, she released a trailer for the album on YouTube. In support of the album, Goulding embarked on the Brightest Blue Tour, which began on 28 April 2021.

For the album's physical release, Goulding and her team opted to have copies manufactured with as many environmentally-friendly materials as possible. According to Goulding's official digital store, a regular single-disc CD is packaged in a Digisleeve manufactured with FSC-certified recycled cardboard and is sealed in a "plant-based" wrap. Variations of formats such as cassette tapes and vinyl records have also been manufactured with minimised or recycled plastic materials and packaging. Goulding added "[...] great progress has been made on this and I'm pleased we've been able to push the industry forwards, but we are still pushing to do more."

=== Singles ===
On 13 March 2020, Goulding released "Worry About Me", a collaboration with Blackbear, as the first single from the album. The accompanying music video, directed by Emil Nava, was released the same day. Upon the song's release, it received generally positive reviews from music critics. Commercially, the song debuted at number 78 on the UK Singles Chart. On 21 May 2020, "Power" was released as the album's second single. The accompanying music video was directed by Imogen Snell and Riccardo Castano, and was released later the same day. It peaked at number 86 in the UK. The Lauv-assisted "Slow Grenade" was released as the third single on 30 June 2020. "Love I'm Given" was released as the album's fourth single on 19 August 2020, along with a music video.

=== Brightest Blue Tour ===
Brightest Blue
- Tour by Ellie Goulding
- Location: United Kingdom
- Associated album: Brightest Blue
- Start date: 7 October 2021
- End date: 17 October 2021
- Legs: 1
- No. of shows: 6

Ellie Goulding concert chronology
- Delirium World Tour (2016–17); Brightest Blue Tour (2021); Higher Than Heaven Tour (2023)

=== Set list ===
This set list is representative of the concert in Glasgow on 7 October 2021. It does not represent all concerts for the tour.

1. "Start"
2. "Power"
3. "How Deep Is Too Deep"
4. "Powerful"
5. "Aftertaste"
6. "New Heights"
7. "Bleach"
8. "New Love"
9. "Flux"
10. "Only You"
11. "Worry About Me"
12. "I Need Your Love"
13. "Close To Me"
14. "Love I'm Given"
15. "Woman"
16. "Love Me Like You Do"
17. "Tides"
18. "Brightest Blue"
19. "Holding On For Life"
20. "Anything Could Happen"

Encore

1. "Lights"
2. "Burn"

Notes

- During the show in London, Goulding performed "Hate Me", and "Tides" was performed before "Love Me Like You Do".

List of concerts, showing date, city, country and venue
Dates	City	Country	Venue	Support Act
7 October 2021	Glasgow	Scotland	O_{2} Academy	L Devine
9 October 2021	Newcastle	England	O_{2} Academy	L Devine
11 October 2021	Manchester	England	O_{2} Apollo	L Devine
13 October 2021	Birmingham	England	O_{2} Academy	L Devine
15 October 2021	Bournemouth	England	O_{2} Academy	L Devine
17 October 2021	London	England	Eventim Apollo	L Devine

Cancelled Dates

Dates	City	Country	Venue	Reason for Cancellation
5 October 2021	Dublin	Ireland	Olympia Theatre	Unforeseen circumstances

== Critical reception ==
Professional ratings
Aggregate scores
Source	Rating
AnyDecentMusic?	6.7/10
Metacritic	74/100
Review scores
Source	Rating
AllMusic	4/5 stars
The Arts Desk	4/5 stars
Evening Standard	4/5 stars
Exclaim!	7/10
The Independent	4/5 stars
The Line of Best Fit	7.5/10
MusicOMH	4/5 stars
Pitchfork	6.4/10
Slant Magazine	1.5/5 stars
The Telegraph	4/5 stars

Brightest Blue received generally favourable reviews from music critics. At Metacritic, which assigns a normalised rating out of 100 to reviews from professional critics, the album received a weighted average score of 74, based on ten reviews. Aggregator AnyDecentMusic? gave the album a 6.7 out of 10, based on their assessment of the critical consensus.

Reviewing the album for AllMusic, Neil Z. Yeung called the album, "a powerful reclamation of self that recaptures the simplicity of her debut and the vulnerability of Halcyon", as well as a statement that "has growth and maturity at its core". Rachel MacGrath for Evening Standard also praised Goulding's maturity as an artist, stating that her "signature attributes are present and correct on her first album in five years. But this time around, there’s a confidence in her vocals and songwriting that wasn't always there before." Dave Beech for The Line of Best Fit appreciated the record honesty, finding it to be Goulding's "most heartfelt" body of work. Particularly, complementing the standard tracks for being the "most rounded", as well the "most accomplished" side.

Several critics were divided with the inclusion of the B-Side, EG.0, with some stating that the inclusion was unnecessary. Damien Morris on his review for The Guardian, said that Goulding needs to be more confident with herself, stating that: "she might need more ego, but she doesn't need EG.0." Dave Beech for The Line of Best Fit added to his positive review that Brightest Blue is another proof that Goulding is at her best when she refuses the urge of making chart-topping collaborations, in favour of the "idiosyncratic pop on which she first made her name." In contrast, Katie Tymochenko for Exclaim! was more receptive with the double-side album, as she felt that it allows the singer to grow artistically while at the same time keeping her "pop throne as pop royalty."

Associated Press included Brightest Blue on their Best Albums of 2020 year-end list.

=== Rankings ===
Select year-end rankings of Brightest Blue
Critic/Publication	List	Rank	Ref.
Associated Press	The Best Albums of 2020	10	
AllMusic	The Best Pop Albums of 2020	Listed	

== Commercial performance ==
Brightest Blue became Goulding's third number-one album in the United Kingdom, debuting with sales of 14,820 units. Brightest Blue also reached the top 10 in Scotland and Ireland.

== Track listing ==
Brightest Blue – Side A track listing
No.	Title	Writer(s)	Producer(s)	Length
1.	"Start" (featuring Serpentwithfeet)	Ellie Goulding; Joseph Kearns; Maxwell Cooke; Jonathan Josiah Wise	Kearns; Cooke^{[a]}; Forest Swords^{[a]}	5:07
2.	"Power"	Goulding; Jamie Scott; Jonathan Coffer; David Frank Paich; Lucy Taylor; Nicholas James Gale; Jack Tarrant	Scott; Coffer	3:11
3.	"How Deep Is Too Deep"	Goulding; Kearns; Finlay Dow-Smith	Starsmith; Kearns^{[v]}	3:25
4.	"Cyan"	Goulding; Kearns; Jim Eliot; Dow-Smith	Kearns; Eliot^{[a]}; Starsmith^{[a]}	0:57
5.	"Love I'm Given"	Goulding; Kearns; Eliot	Kearns; Eliot; Mike Wise	3:29
6.	"New Heights"	Goulding; Patrick Wimberly; Kearns; Cooke	Kearns; Wimberly	4:12
7.	"Ode to Myself"	Goulding; Kearns	Kearns	1:51
8.	"Woman"	Goulding; Eli Teplin; Tobias Jesso Jr.; Christopher Stacey	Kearns; Starsmith; Teplin	3:47
9.	"Tides"	Goulding; Kearns; Dow-Smith	Starsmith	3:51
10.	"Wine Drunk"	Goulding; Kearns	Kearns	0:48
11.	"Bleach"	Goulding; Kearns	Kearns; Wimberly^{[a]}	3:17
12.	"Flux"	Goulding; Kearns; Eliot	Kearns; Cooke	3:50
13.	"Brightest Blue"	Goulding; Kearns; Eliot	Kearns; Eliot	4:49
Total length:				42:34

EG.0 – Side B track listing
No.	Title	Writer(s)	Producer(s)	Length
14.	"Overture"	James Wyatt	Wyatt; Kearns	1:17
15.	"Worry About Me" (featuring Blackbear)	Goulding; Savan Kotecha; Ilya Salmanzadeh; Peter Svensson; Matthew Musto	Ilya	2:59
16.	"Slow Grenade" (featuring Lauv)	Goulding; Kearns; Ari Leff; Brett McLaughlin; Oscar Görres	Kearns; Görres; Kearns^{[v]}	3:37
17.	"Close to Me" (with Diplo featuring Swae Lee)	Goulding; Thomas Wesley Pentz; Kotecha; Salmanzadeh; Svensson; Khalif Brown	Diplo; Ilya^{[p]}; Bas van Daalen^{[a]}; Alvaro^{[a]}	3:02
18.	"Hate Me" (with Juice Wrld)	Goulding; Brittany Hazzard; Andrew Wotman; Stefan Johnson; Jordan K. Johnson; Marcus Lomax; Jason Evigan; Jarad Higgins	Watt; The Monsters and the Strangerz^{[p]}; Evigan^{[p]}; Gian Stone^{[v]}	3:06
Total length:				56:35

International digital edition bonus track
No.	Title	Writer(s)	Producer(s)	Length
19.	"Sixteen"	Goulding; Kearns; Rachel Keen; Fred Gibson	M. Wise; Fred; Ian Kirkpatrick^{[c]}; Kearns^{[v]}	3:21
Total length:				59:56

Japanese version bonus track
No.	Title	Writer(s)	Producer(s)	Length
19.	"Close to Me (Red Velvet Remix)" (with Diplo featuring Red Velvet)	Goulding; Pentz; Kotecha; Salmanzadeh; Svensson; Wooyoung Jang; Shon Seung-wan; Kim Ye-rim; Sungsu Min; Eugene Kwon; Min-Kyu Lee; Lee Seu Ran	Diplo; Ilya; van Daalen^{[a]}; Alvaro^{[a]}	3:09
Total length:				59:44

=== Notes ===
- ^{^[p]} signifies a primary and vocal producer
- ^{^[c]} signifies a co-producer
- ^{^[a]} signifies an additional producer
- ^{^[v]} signifies a vocal producer
- "Power" interpolates "Be the One", as performed by Dua Lipa and written by Lucy Taylor, Nicholas James Gale and Jack Tarrant. This song also interpolates "Georgy Porgy", as performed by Toto and written by David Paich.

== Brightest Blue: Music for Calm ==
Brightest Blue: Music for Calm

Remix album by Ellie Goulding
- Released: 9 January 2021
- Length: 62:56
- Label: Polydor
- Producer: Matthew Pauling

Ellie Goulding chronology
Brightest Blue (2020)	Brightest Blue: Music for Calm (2021)	Halcyon Nights (2022)

Brighest Blue: Music for Calm is the third remix album by English singer and songwriter Ellie Goulding, mixed by Matthew Pauling released on streaming platforms 8 January 2021 under Polydor Records. The album consists of five remixes of tracks from Goulding's fourth studio album, Brightest Blue, in a partnership with the meditation app, Calm.

=== Release ===
Music for Calm is a partnership with the company Calm, which works as a meditation, and relaxation app. Goulding designed the mix of songs to help Calm users to relax and unwind. The album was released exclusively for the app, Calm in July 2020, and was made available on streaming platforms in January 2021.

"We all could do with a moment of calm right now. Listen to my Brightest Blue remixes for Calm now." – Ellie Goulding, via Facebook

=== Track listing ===
Brightest Blue: Music for Calm track listing
No.	Title	Lyrics	Mixer(s)	Length
1.	"Brightest Blue" (Meditation Mix / Medley)	Ellie Goulding	Matthew Pauling	31:28
2.	"Ode to Myself" (Calm Remix)	Goulding; Joe Kearns	Pauling	6:07
3.	"Brightest Blue" (Calm Remix)	Goulding; Jim Eliot; Kearns	Pauling	8:15
4.	"Bleach" (Calm Remix)	Goulding; Kearns	Pauling	9:12
5.	"Love I'm Given" (Calm Remix)	Goulding; Eliot; Kearns	Pauling	7:54
Total length:				62:56

== Personnel ==
Musicians

- Ellie Goulding – vocals (all tracks), background vocals (tracks 2, 15), guitar (7)
- Joe Kearns – drums (1, 13), keyboards (1, 4, 6–8, 11, 13), programming (1, 4, 6–8, 11–14), piano (6, 10), keyboards arrangement (11), bass guitar (12)
- Katherine Jenkinson – cello (1, 6)
- Ashok Klouda – cello (1, 6)
- Emma Denton – cello (1)
- John Myerscough – cello (1)
- Max Cooke – keyboards, piano (1); string arrangement (6, 12, 13)
- Laurie Anderson – viola (1, 6)
- Meghan Cassidy – viola (1, 6)
- Beatrix Lovejoy – violin (1, 6)
- Jenny Sacha – violin (1, 6)
- Mandhira De Saram – violin (1, 6)
- Matthew Denton – violin (1, 6)
- Natalie Klouda – violin (1, 6)
- Thomas Gould – violin (1, 6)
- Ann Beilby – viola (1)
- Timothy Grant – viola (1)
- Antonia Kesel – violin (1)
- Claudia Ajmone-Marsan – violin (1)
- Elizabeth Cooney – violin (1)
- Eloisa-Fleur Thom – violin (1)
- Magdalena Filipczak – violin (1)
- Martyn Jackson – violin (1)
- Serpentwithfeet – vocals (1)
- Nicholas Brown – background vocals, choir arrangement, conductor (2, 13), piano (13)
- Olivia Williams – background vocals, choir arrangement (2, 13)
- Althea Edwards – background vocals (2, 13)
- Angel Lindsay-Mae – background vocals (2, 13)
- Dee Lewis-Clay – background vocals (2, 13)
- Desrine Ramus – background vocals (2, 13)
- Gabriele Williams-Silvera – background vocals (2, 13)
- Hannah Khemoh – background vocals (2, 13)
- Joel Bailey – background vocals (2, 13)
- Kenneth Mark Burton – background vocals (2, 13)
- Mariama Frida Touray – background vocals (2, 13)
- Patrick Linton – background vocals (2, 13)
- Paul Boldeau – background vocals (2, 13)
- Philip Kwaku Yeboah – background vocals (2, 13)
- Rochelle Sanderson-Mendes – background vocals (2, 13)
- Serena Prince – background vocals (2, 13)
- Tehillah Daniel – background vocals (2, 13)
- Beau Blaise – background vocals, programming (2)
- Jamie Scott – background vocals, bass guitar, drum programming, guitar, keyboards (2)
- Will Brown – background vocals, synthesizer (2)
- Jonny Coffer – bass guitar, drum programming, guitar, keyboards (2)
- Starsmith – programming, synthesizer (3, 8, 9); keyboards, percussion (3, 9); guitar, piano, saxophone (6)
- Jim Eliot – keyboards (4, 13), programming (4, 13), piano (12)
- Mike Wise – bass guitar, drums, guitar, organ, piano, programming, synthesizer programming (5)
- Zach Bines – vocals (5), spoken word (13)
- Patrick Wimberly – programming (6, 11); bass guitar, drums, guitar (6)
- Ben Chappell – cello (6)
- Jason Klauber – guitar (6)
- David Wrench – programming (6)
- Eoin Schmidt-Martin – viola (6)
- Kotono Sato – viola (6)
- Ariel Lang – violin (6)
- Ciaran McCabe – violin (6)
- Daniel Pioro – violin (6)
- Michelle Fleming – violin (6)
- Nina Foster – violin (6)
- Raja Halder – violin (6)
- Eli Teplin – organ, piano, synth bass, synthesizer (8)
- James Wyatt – strings (8, 9, 11), piano (11, 14); programming, string arrangement (14)
- Rowan McIntosh – acoustic guitar (11)
- Joe Clegg – percussion (12)
- Sam Thompson – piano (13)
- James Brett – conductor (14)
- Bob Knight – vocal arrangement (14)
- Leo Kotecha – background vocals (15)
- Mylo Kotecha – background vocals (15)
- Ilya – bass guitar, drums, percussion (15, 17), programming (15, 17); keyboards arrangement (15); background vocals, guitar, keyboards (17)
- Peter Svensson – guitar (15, 17)
- Savan Kotecha – piano (15), background vocals (17)
- Blackbear – vocals (15)
- Oscar Görres – background vocals (16), bass guitar (16), drums (16), guitar (16), keyboards (16), percussion (16), programming (16)
- Lauv – vocals (16)
- Alvaro – programming (17)
- Bas van Daalen – programming (17)
- Diplo – programming (17)
- Swae Lee – vocals (17)
- Jason Evigan – guitar (18), programming (18)
- The Monsters & Strangerz – programming (18)
- Juice Wrld – vocals (18)

Technical

- Matt Colton – mastering (1–13)
- Randy Merrill – mastering (14–17, 19)
- Emerson Mancini – mastering (18)
- Jamie Snell – mixing (1, 3, 8, 9, 11–13)
- Serban Ghenea – mixing (2, 5, 15–17, 19)
- Jason Elliott – mixing (4, 7, 10), engineering (1, 4–6, 8, 12, 13, 15, 16, 18)
- David Wrench – mixing (6)
- John Hanes – mixing (14), engineering (2, 5, 17, 19), mixing assistance (15, 16)
- Manny Marroquin – mixing (18)
- Andy Cook – engineering (1, 9, 11, 13), engineering assistance (8)
- Joe Kearns – engineering (1, 5–8, 10, 11, 13), vocal engineering (19)
- Adam Miller – engineering (2, 13)
- Martin Hannah – engineering (2)
- Patrick Wimberly – engineering (6, 11)
- Miles BA Robinson – engineering (6)
- Mathew P. Scheiner – engineering (8)
- Nick Taylor – engineering (14)
- Ilya – engineering (15)
- Diplo – engineering (17)
- Swae Lee – engineering (17)
- Sam Holland – engineering (17)
- Randy Lanphear – engineering, mixing assistance (17)
- Chris Galland – mix engineering (5)
- Grace Banks – mixing assistance (6)
- Simon Gooding – mixing assistance (6)
- Josef Gomez – mixing assistance (17)
- Manny Park – engineering assistance (1, 3, 5, 6, 9, 13)
- Luke Gibbs – engineering assistance (4, 7, 10)
- Mark Knight – engineering assistance (12)
- Rowan McIntosh – engineering assistance (12)
- Olly Thompson – engineering assistance (14)
- Cory Brice – engineering assistance (17)
- Jeremy Lertola – engineering assistance (17)
- Thom Yorke – bass, keyboards
- Jonny Greenwood – guitars, keyboards

Special Quest (with members of R.E.M.)

- Peter Buck – lead guitar
- Mike Mills – bass, keyboards, backing vocals
- Michael Stipe – lead vocals, keyboards

Personnel: Brightest Blue: Music for Calm

- Ellie Goulding – Composer Lyricist; Associated Performer; Vocals
- Joe Kearns – Composer Lyricist; Producer; Associated Performer; Keyboards; Keyboards Arrangements; Programming; Studio Personnel; Recording Engineer
- Matthew Pauling – Studio Personnel; Remixer
- Matt Colton – Studio Personnel; Mastering Engineer
- Jamie Snell – Studio Personnel; Mixer
- Andy Cook – Studio Personnel, Asst.; Recording Engineer
- Jason Elliot – Programmer; Studio Personnel; Recording Engineer
- James Wyatt – Associated Performer; Piano; Strings
- Rowan McIntosh – Associated Performer; Acoustic Guitar
- Patrick Wimberly – Producer; Additional Producer; Associated Performer; Programming; Studio Personnel; Engineer

== Charts ==
Chart performance for Brightest Blue
Chart (2020)	Peak position
Australian Albums (ARIA)	25
Austrian Albums (Ö3 Austria)	29
Belgian Albums (Ultratop Flanders)	17
Belgian Albums (Ultratop Wallonia)	37
Canadian Albums (Billboard)	38
Czech Albums (ČNS IFPI)	58
Dutch Albums (Album Top 100)	94
French Albums (SNEP)	101
German Albums (Offizielle Top 100)	12
Irish Albums (Official Charts)	9
Italian Albums (FIMI)	86
New Zealand Albums (RMNZ)	19
Norwegian Albums (VG-lista)	30
Polish Albums (ZPAV)	24
Scottish Albums (Official Charts)	2
Slovak Albums (ČNS IFPI)	74
Spanish Albums (PROMUSICAE)	47
Swiss Albums (Schweizer Hitparade)	9
UK Albums (Official Charts)	1
US Billboard 200	29

== Certifications and sales ==
Certifications for Brightest Blue
Region	Certification	Certified units/sales
Canada (Music Canada)	Gold	40,000^{‡}
New Zealand (RMNZ)	Gold	15,000^{‡}
Poland (ZPAV)	Gold	10,000^{‡}
Singapore (RIAS)	Gold	5,000^{*}
United Kingdom (BPI)	Silver	60,000^{‡}
United States (RIAA)	Gold	500,000^{‡}
^{*} Sales figures based on certification alone.^{‡} Sales+streaming figures based on certification alone.

== Release history ==
Release dates and formats for Brightest Blue
Region	Date	Format	Label	Edition	Ref.
Various	17 July 2020	Box set; cassette; CD; digital download; LP; streaming	Polydor	Original	
Various	24 July 2020	Meditation app	Calm	Music for Calm	
Japan	26 August 2020	CD	Universal Music Japan	Japan bonus track	
Various	8 January 2021	digital download; streaming	Polydor	Music for Calm	

== See also ==
- List of UK Albums Chart number ones of the 2020s
- List of UK Album Downloads Chart number ones of the 2020s
