= Picard Brothers =

French musical duo

- Origin: Paris, France
- Genres: French house; Electronic; dance music; Indie pop; R&B; pop
- Occupations: Record producers; songwriters; DJs
- Years active: 2011–present
- Members: Maxime Picard; Clément Picard

Picard Brothers are a duo of producers, songwriters and DJs composed by Maxime Picard and Clément Picard. The two French brothers have written and produced for Diplo, Mark Ronson, Silk City, Beyoncé, Madonna and many others throughout their career. They won a Grammy Award in 2019 for Best Dance Recording for their contribution to "Electricity" by Silk City and Dua Lipa.

They also release their own artist project under the name Picard Brothers.

== Career ==
Picard Brothers started their music career at an early age and produced beats for French rappers.

In 2011, they met and started working closely with Diplo, becoming part of his core production crew. They quickly signed their first Platinum certified song "It Won't Stop" by Sevyn Streeter and Chris Brown

Working between Paris and Los Angeles, they have been involved in many Diplo and Major Lazer releases such as "Powerful" with Ellie Goulding and Tarrus Riley, "Look Back" with DRAM.

In 2018, they met Mark Ronson and helped in the creation of Silk City: they co-signed the Grammy winning hit "Electricity" amongst the other singles. They continued working with Mark Ronson and co-wrote and co-produced his latest album Late Night Feelings including the single "Nothing Breaks Like a Heart" with Miley Cyrus.

The duo also wrote and produced for other artists like Beyoncé, Kehlani, Miley Cyrus, Yebba, Wizkid, Mr Eazi and more.

As artists, the Picard Brothers have released their artist project in 2020 with the single "Won't Let Go", remixed by House legend Todd Edwards. Followed by a series of singles and an EP through Because Music/Island UK.

== Discography ==
=== Songwriting and production credits ===
Title	Year	Artist(s)	Album	Credit
"Body to Body"	2026	BTS	Arirang	Writers, Producers
"Nobody Move"	2025	Major Lazer, Vybz Kartel	Guns Don't Kill People... Lazers Do (15th Anniversary Edition)	Writers, Producers
"Sawa"	2024	Diplo, Msaki	Non-album single	Writers, Producers
"Midnight Ride"	2024	Orville Peck, Kylie Minogue, Diplo	Stampede	Producers
"Sweat Morning Heat"	2024	Meghan Trainor, Jimmy Fallon	Unfrosted Netflix Movie	Writers, Producers
"I'm Just Ken"	2023	Ryan Gosling	Barbie The Album	Additional producers
"Dance The Night"	2023	Dua Lipa	Barbie The Album	Producers
"Use Me (Brutal Hearts)"	2023	Diplo, Dove Cameron, Sturgill Simpson	Diplo Presents Thomas Wesley: Chapter 2 - Swamp Savant	Writers, Producers
"Sad in the Summer"	2023	Diplo, Lily Rose	Diplo Presents Thomas Wesley: Chapter 2 - Swamp Savant	Writers, Producers
"Never Die"	2023	Diplo, Morgan Wade	Diplo Presents Thomas Wesley: Chapter 2 - Swamp Savant	Writers, Producers
"Lonely Long"	2023	Diplo, Parker McCollum	Diplo Presents Thomas Wesley: Chapter 2 - Swamp Savant	Writers, Producers
"Supernova"	2023	Aluna, Kaleena Zanders	MYCELiUM	Writers, Producers
"Tupelo Shuffle"	2022	Swae Lee, Diplo	ELVIS (Original Motion Picture Soundtrack)	Writers, Producers
"Too Much"	2022	Mark Ronson, Lucky Daye	Non-album single	Writers, Producers
"One Life"	2021	Mark Ronson, Diana Gordon, Jonsi	Watch the Sound With Mark Ronson	Writers, Producers
"Love Came Down"	2021	Yebba	Dawn	Producers
"Boomerang"	2021	Yebba	Dawn	Producers
"New Love"	2021	Silk City, Ellie Goulding	Non-album single	Writers, Producers
"Easy"	2020	Troye Sivan, Kacey Musgraves, Mark Ronson	Non-album single	Producers
"Bad Karma"	2020	Miley Cyrus	Plastic Hearts	Producers
"Rollercoaster"	2019	Audien, Liam O'Donnell	Escapism	Writers
"Already"	2019	Beyonce, Shatta Wale, Major Lazer	The Lion King: The Gift	Writers, Producers
"Fly"	2019	Lucky Daye	Spies In Disguise Soundtrack	Writers, Producers
"Where Do You Go"	2019	Yebba	Non-album single	Producers
"Nothing Breaks Like A Heart"	2019	Mark Ronson, Miley Cyrus	Late Night Feelings	Writers, Producers
"Don't Leave Me Lonely"	2019	Mark Ronson, Yebba	Late Night Feelings	Writers, Producers
"Pieces Of Us"	2019	Mark Ronson, King Princess	Late Night Feelings	Writers, Producers
"Late Night Feelings"	2019	Mark Ronson, Lykke Li	Late Night Feelings	Writers, Producers
"Late Night Prelude"	2019	Mark Ronson	Late Night Feelings	Writers, Producers
"2AM"	2019	Mark Ronson, Lykke Li	Late Night Feelings	Writers, Producers
"Spinning"	2019	Mark Ronson, Ilsey	Late Night Feelings	Writers, Producers
"True Blue"	2019	Mark Ronson, Angel Olsen	Late Night Feelings	Producers
"Why Hide"	2019	Mark Ronson, Diana Gordon	Late Night Feelings	Producers
"Give Dem"	2019	Diplo, Kah-Lo, Blond:ish	Non-album single	Writers, Producers
"Future"	2019	Madonna, Quavo	Madame X	Writers, Producers
"Boom Bye Bye"	2019	Diplo, Niska	Europa (EP)	Writers, Producers
"Fuego"	2019	MHD	19	Writers, Producers
"1by1"	2019	Rudimental, Raye, Maleek Berry	Toast to Our Differences	Writers, Producers
"Electricity"	2018	Silk City, Dua Lipa	Non-album single	Writers, Producers
"Only Can Get Better"	2018	Silk City, Daniel Merriweather	Non-album single	Writers, Producers
"Loud"	2018	Silk City, GoldLink, Desiigner	Non-album single	Writers, Producers
"Happy Xmas (War Is Over)"	2018	Miley Cyrus, Mark Ronson	Non-album single	Producer
"Loyal"	2018	Major Lazer, Kizz Daniel, Kranium	Africa Is The Future	Writers, Producers
"Orkant/Balane Pon It"	2018	Major Lazer, Babes Wodumo, Taranchyla	Africa Is The Future	Writers, Producers
"All My Life"	2018	Major Lazer, Burna Boy	Africa Is The Future	Writers, Producers
"Blow That Smoke"	2018	Major Lazer, Tove Lo	Africa Is The Future	Writers, Producers
"Open & Close"	2018	Mr Eazi, Diplo	Life is Easy, Vol.2 - Lagos to London	Writers, Producers
"Color Blind"	2018	Diplo, Lil Xan	California (EP)	Writers, Producers
"Look Back"	2018	Diplo, DRAM	California (EP)	Writers, Producers
"Live It Up"	2018	Nicky Jam, Will Smith, Era Istrefi	Official Song 2018 FIFA World Cup Russia	Writers, Producers
"Naughty Ride"	2017	Wizkid, Major Lazer	Sounds From The Other Side	Writers, Producers
"My Love"	2017	Wale, Major Lazer, Dua Lipa	SHINE	Writers, Producers
"Too Much"	2017	Kehlani	SweetSexySavage	Writers, Producers
"I Can"	2017	Chronixx	Chronology	Writers, Producers
"Loneliness"	2017	Chronixx	Chronology	Producers
"Charbonne"	2017	Kekra	Vréel 3	Writers, Producers
"Tout Seul"	2017	Kekra	Vréel 3	Writers, Producers
"Pas Millionné"	2017	Kekra	Vréel 3	Writers, Producers
"Tiekson"	2017	Kekra	Vréel 3	Writers, Producers
"Capuché"	2017	Kekra	Vréel 3	Writers, Producers
"9 Milli"	2017	Kekra	Vréel 2	Writers, Producers
"Jsuis là pour..."	2017	Kekra	Vréel 2	Writers, Producers
"Burning Bridges"	2016	Patrice	Life's Blood	Writers, Producers
"Powerful"	2015	Major Lazer, Ellie Goulding, Tarrus Riley	Peace Is The Mission	Writers, Producers
"Sweet Talker"	2014	Jessie J	Sweet Talker	Writers, Producers
"It Won't Stop"	2013	Sevyn Streeter, Chris Brown	Call Me Crazy, But...	Writers, Producers

=== EPs ===
- Systematic EP (Because Music, 2023)
- Blessing in This House (Island Records UK, 2021)
- Won't Let Go (Island Records UK, 2021)

=== Singles ===
- Dead Good (Nervous Records, 2022)
- People Hold On (Nervous Records, 2022)
- I Made It (Ed Banger Records, 2022)
- Best of Me (Island Records UK/Because Music, 2021)
- It's Not Over (Island Records UK, 2020)
- Running From My Life (Records Collection, 2017)
- Goodbye & Good Luck (Pelican Fly, 2014)

=== Remixes ===
Track	Artist	Year
Could You Help Me (Picard Brothers Remix)	Lucy Rose	2024
Don't Be Afraid (Picard Brothers Remix)	Diplo feat. Jungle & Damian Lazarus	2021
So Good (Picard Brothers Remix)	Fred Falke, Zen Freeman & Ten Ven	2021
Let You Speak (Picard Brothers Remix)	Myd	2021
My Night (Picard Brothers Remix)	Claptone	2021
Watch Your Step (Picard Brothers Remix)	Disclosure feat. Kelis	2020
The Difference (Picard Brothers Remix)	Flume feat. Tory y Moi	2020
Missing U (Silk City & Picard Brothers Remix)	Robyn	2019
Colors (Picard Brothers Remix)	Beck	2018
