= Flux (Ellie Goulding song) =

2019 song by Ellie Goulding

Single by Ellie Goulding
- Released: 1 March 2019
- Recorded: 2018
- Studio: British Grove Studios (London); Kore Studios (London)
- Length: 3:49
- Label: Polydor
- Songwriters: Ellie Goulding; Joe Kearns; Jim Eliot
- Producers: Kearns; Maxwell Cooke

Ellie Goulding singles chronology
"Mama" (2019)	"Flux" (2019)	"Close To Me" (Red Velvet remix) (2019)

Music video
- "Flux" on YouTube

"Flux" is a song by English singer-songwriter Ellie Goulding, released on 1 March 2019. The song was written by Goulding, Jim Eliot and Joe Kearns. It was included on Goulding's fourth studio album, Brightest Blue (2020).

== Background ==
In an interview with The Guardian on New Year's Day 2019, Goulding announced that her fourth album would be released in 2019. She also talked about three songs named "Flux", "Love I'm Given" and "Electricity". According to her, "Flux" is "about the person who you almost ended up with". On 21 February, she took to social media to announce the single by posting its cover art and the release date of the track. The following week she shared further details regarding the song, including lyrics and a still from the music video.

== Composition ==
"Flux" is written in the key of C major and has a tempo of 93 beats per minute in common time.

== Music video ==
Goulding posted a silent teaser of the music video hours prior to its release. The accompanying music video premiered on YouTube on 1 March 2019, alongside the song's official release on all platforms. Shot entirely in black and white, the video depicts Goulding inside a dark hall playing a piano as rain pours on her. The video ends as a soaked Goulding stares gloomily at the camera as the rain continues.

== Track listing ==
Digital download
No.	Title	Length
1.	"Flux"	3:49

== Personnel ==
Credits adapted from Tidal.

- Ellie Goulding – lead vocals, songwriting, associated performer
- Joe Kearns – songwriting, production, engineering, programming, bass guitar, associated performer
- Jim Eliot – songwriting, piano, associated performer
- Maxwell Cooke – production, associated performer, string arranger
- Joe Clegg – associated performer, percussion
- Mark Knight – assistant recording engineer, studio personnel
- Rowan McIntosh – assistant recording engineer, studio personnel
- Hilary Skewes – strings contractor
- Jason Elliott – engineer, studio personnel
- Matt Colton – mastering, studio personnel
- Jamie Snell – mixing, studio personnel
- Sam Thompson - conductor

== Charts ==
Chart (2019)	Peak position
New Zealand Hot Singles (RMNZ)	32
Scottish Singles Sales (Official Charts)	35
UK Singles (Official Charts)	97

== Release history ==
Region	Date	Format	Label	Ref.
Various	1 March 2019	Digital download; streaming	Polydor	
