= Mama (Clean Bandit song) =

- Acoustic and remix versions cover

Single by Clean Bandit featuring Ellie Goulding

from the album What Is Love?
- Released: 22 February 2019
- Studio: Club Ralph, London; Kore Studios, London; RAK Studios, London
- Length: 3:09
- Label: Atlantic
- Songwriters: Jack Patterson; Grace Chatto; Jason Evigan; Caroline Ailin; Ellie Goulding
- Producers: Patterson; Chatto; Mark Ralph

Clean Bandit singles chronology
"Baby" (2018)	"Mama" (2019)	"Lost" (2019)

Ellie Goulding singles chronology
"Close to Me" (2018)	"Mama" (2019)	"Flux" (2019)

Music video
- "Mama" on YouTube

"Mama" is a song by the English electronic music group Clean Bandit featuring the English singer Ellie Goulding, released as the sixth and final single from Clean Bandit's second album, What Is Love?, on 22 February 2019.

== Music video ==
Clean Bandit also released the video on YouTube on 25 February 2019, after postponing its launch several times due to technical problems. The video stars a character who resembles Donald Trump, mocking his childhood to his adulthood when he is elected president. The band stated they wrote a script about "a boy whose power was taken away from him as a child and he grew up determined to take that power back."

== Track listing ==
- Digital download – Tiësto's Big Room Remix
1. "Mama" (Tiësto's Big Room Remix) – 2:36
- Digital download – Morgan Page Remix
1. "Mama" (Morgan Page Remix) – 2:57
- Digital download – acoustic
1. "Mama" (acoustic) – 3:06
2. "Mama" – 3:09

== Charts ==
=== Weekly charts ===
Chart (2019)	Peak position
Hungary (Dance Top 40)	20
Ireland (IRMA)	97
Israel (Media Forest)	9
Israel (Media Forest TV Airplay)	1
Poland Airplay (ZPAV)	10
Romania (Airplay 100)	62
Scottish Singles Sales (Official Charts)	63
UK Singles (Official Charts)	98
US Hot Dance/Electronic Songs (Billboard)	19

=== Year-end charts ===
Chart (2019)	Position
Hungary (Dance Top 40)	59
Poland (ZPAV)	89
US Hot Dance/Electronic Songs (Billboard)	73

== Certifications ==
Region	Certification	Certified units/sales
Poland (ZPAV)	Platinum	50,000^{‡}
^{‡} Sales+streaming figures based on certification alone.

== Release history ==
Region	Date	Format	Version	Label	Ref.
United Kingdom	23 February 2019	Adult contemporary	Original	Warner	
Various	8 March 2019	Digital download; streaming	Tiësto's Big Room Remix	Atlantic	
Italy	15 March 2019	Contemporary hit radio	Original	Warner	
Various	15 March 2019	Digital download; streaming	Morgan Page Remix	Atlantic	
Various	22 March 2019	Digital download; streaming	Acoustic	Atlantic	
