= Slow Grenade =

2020 single by Ellie Goulding featuring Lauv

- Syn Cole remix cover

Single by Ellie Goulding featuring Lauv

from the album Brightest Blue
- Released: 30 June 2020
- Recorded: 2020
- Genre: Pop; R&B
- Length: 3:38
- Label: Polydor
- Songwriters: Ellie Goulding; Ari Staprans Leff; Brett McLaughlin; Joe Kearns; Oscar Görres
- Producers: Joe Kearns; Oscar Görres

Ellie Goulding singles chronology
| "Power" (2020) | "Slow Grenade" (2020) | "Love I'm Given" (2020) |

Lauv singles chronology
| "Dishes" (2020) | "Slow Grenade" (2020) | "Kings & Queens, Pt. 2" (2020) |

Lyric video
- "Slow Grenade" on YouTube

"Slow Grenade" is a song by the English singer-songwriter Ellie Goulding featuring American singer Lauv, released as the third single from Goulding's fourth studio album Brightest Blue, through Polydor Records on 30 June 2020. It was written by Goulding, Lauv, Leland, and its producers Joe Kearns and Oscar Görres.

== Background and release ==
Goulding announced the song on social media on 29 June. It was released on 30 June and a lyric video was released on 3 July.

== Charts ==
| Chart (2020) | Peak position |
|---|---|
| New Zealand Hot Singles (RMNZ) | 12 |
| Portugal (AFP) | 82 |
| US Digital Song Sales (Billboard) | 31 |

== Release history ==
| Region | Date | Format | Label | Ref. |
|---|---|---|---|---|
| Various | 30 June 2020 | Digital download; streaming | Polydor | |
| Australia | 3 July 2020 | Contemporary hit radio | UMA; Polydor | |
