= Power (Ellie Goulding song) =

Single by Ellie Goulding

from the album Brightest Blue
- Released: 21 May 2020
- Genre: Synth-pop
- Length: 3:11
- Label: Polydor
- Songwriters: David Paich; Ellie Goulding; Jonathan Charles Coffer; Jack Tarrant; Jamie Scott; Lucy Taylor; Nicholas Gale
- Producers: Johnny Coffer; Jamie Scott

Ellie Goulding singles chronology
"Worry About Me" (2020)	"Power" (2020)	"Slow Grenade" (2020)

Music video
- "Power" on YouTube

"Power" is a song by English singer-songwriter Ellie Goulding, released as the second single from Goulding's fourth studio album, Brightest Blue, through Polydor Records on 21 May 2020. It was written by Goulding and its producers Jonny Coffer and Jamie Scott. Digital Farm Animals, Lucy Taylor and Jack Tarrant were added to the songwriting credited, since the song interpolates English singer Dua Lipa's song "Be the One" (2015). David Paich was also added because of the verse's similarity to the Toto 's song, "Georgy Porgy" (1978).

== Background and release ==
"Power is about relationships in the 21st century, how they can now be dictated by social media, superficiality and material things. The girl in the song is disillusioned by love and the cruel, good looking, self-obsessed people she keeps ending up with."

— Goulding, "Ellie Goulding Releases 'Power' from Upcoming New Album", Press Party

On 19 May, Goulding posted a video on social media with a quote "Are you running out of power?" The video shows a cell phone interface. The following day, she announced the song's title and release date; its cover art was also posted that day. The singer self-shot the song's accompanying video from her home while in lockdown in London. It features Goulding dressed in various outfits in split screen, full shots and selfies.

== Music video ==
The music video for "Power", directed by Imogen Snell and Riccardo Castano, was released on 21 May 2020. Goulding self-shot the song's accompanying video from her home while in lockdown in London, which features her dressed in various outfits in split screen, full shots and selfies.

== Charts ==
Chart (2020)	Peak position
Belgium (Ultratip Bubbling Under Wallonia)	36
New Zealand Hot Singles (RMNZ)	31
Poland Airplay (ZPAV)	56
Scottish Singles Sales (Official Charts)	52
UK Singles (Official Charts)	86

== Release history ==
Release dates and formats for "Power"
Region	Date	Format	Label	Ref.
Various	21 May 2020	Digital download; streaming	Polydor	
Australia	22 May 2020	Contemporary hit radio	Polydor; Universal Music Australia	
United Kingdom	30 May 2020	Adult contemporary radio	Polydor	
