= Hate Me (Ellie Goulding and Juice Wrld song) =

2019 single by Ellie Goulding and Juice Wrld

Single by Ellie Goulding and Juice Wrld
- Released: 26 June 2019
- Recorded: 2019
- Length: 3:06
- Label: Polydor
- Songwriters: Elena Goulding; Jarad Higgins; Jason Evigan; Jordan Johnson; Marcus Lomax; Stefan Johnson; Andrew Wotman; Brittany Hazzard
- Producers: Jason Evigan; The Monsters and the Strangerz

Ellie Goulding singles chronology
"Sixteen" (2019)	"Hate Me" (2019)	"Return to Love" (2019)

Juice Wrld singles chronology
"All Night" (2019)	"Hate Me" (2019)	"Run" (2019)

Music videos
- "Hate Me" on YouTube; "Hate Me" (Vertical version) on YouTube

"Hate Me" is a song by the English singer Ellie Goulding and American rapper Juice Wrld, released as a single on 26 June 2019 through Polydor Records. It was premiered by Zane Lowe as his Beats 1's "World Record" on Beats 1 on 26 June. It was included on Goulding's fourth studio album, Brightest Blue (2020).

== Promotion ==
On 23 June, Goulding posted a short clip on Instagram with audio of herself harmonising set to video of a chain featuring the initials "EG" and "JW", and announced the release date. Around the same time, the pre-order link for "Hate Me" became active. Goulding officially announced the title and collaboration with Juice Wrld on 24 June.

== Critical reception ==
Carl Lamarre of Billboard called the track an "anti-love anthem" that "finds Goulding taking a darker approach, after watching her relationship spiral". Mike Wass of Idolator felt the song is a "hip-hop-flavored banger". Jael Goldfine from Paper wrote that the song is a "moody, masochistic, tongue-in-cheek new collaboration" as Goulding "dares an ex to say all the mean, ugly things broken-hearted people say to each other".

== Chart performance ==
The song debuted at number 82 on the Billboard Hot 100 becoming Goulding's 14th entry on the chart making her the British female artist with the most entries on the chart, surpassing Adele. The next week the song moved to number 74 and peaked number 72 in its original run. Following a rise in popularity on the social media site TikTok, "Hate Me" re-entered the Hot 100 at number 69 in late October, and has since peaked at number 56.

== Music video ==
The music video was filmed on June 19, 2019, and premiered on YouTube on 17 July 2019. It was directed by Saam Farahmand.

== Track listing ==
Digital download
No.	Title	Length
1.	"Hate Me" (with Juice Wrld)	3:06

Digital download
No.	Title	Length
1.	"Hate Me (R3HAB remix)" (featuring Juice Wrld)	3:23

Digital download
No.	Title	Length
1.	"Hate Me" (Snakehips Remix)	3:15

== Charts ==
=== Weekly charts ===
Chart (2019–2020)	Peak position
Australia (ARIA)	93
Austria (Ö3 Austria Top 40)	51
Belgium (Ultratip Bubbling Under Flanders)	32
Belgium (Ultratip Bubbling Under Wallonia)	18
Canada Hot 100 (Billboard)	33
CIS Airplay (TopHit)	156
Czech Republic Airplay (ČNS IFPI)	32
Czech Republic Singles Digital (ČNS IFPI)	48
Estonia (IFPI)	27
Finland (Suomen virallinen lista)	14
Germany (GfK)	70
Hungary (Single Top 40)	18
Hungary (Stream Top 40)	25
Ireland (IRMA)	33
Latvia (LAIPA)	20
Lithuania (AGATA)	28
New Zealand Hot Singles (RMNZ)	5
Romania (Airplay 100)	72
Scottish Singles Sales (Official Charts)	30
Slovakia Singles Digital (ČNS IFPI)	39
Sweden (Sverigetopplistan)	76
UK Singles (Official Charts)	33
US Billboard Hot 100	56
US Adult Pop Airplay (Billboard)	23
US Dance Airplay (Billboard)	35
US Pop Airplay (Billboard)	19
US Rolling Stone Top 100	42

=== Year-end charts ===
Chart (2019)	Position
Latvia (LAIPA)	64

== Certifications ==
Region	Certification	Certified units/sales
Australia (ARIA)	Platinum	70,000^{‡}
Brazil (Pro-Música Brasil)	Platinum	40,000^{‡}
Canada (Music Canada)	Platinum	80,000^{‡}
Denmark (IFPI Danmark)	Platinum	90,000^{‡}
Germany (BVMI)	Gold	200,000^{‡}
Italy (FIMI)	Gold	35,000^{‡}
New Zealand (RMNZ)	2× Platinum	60,000^{‡}
Poland (ZPAV)	Platinum	50,000^{‡}
Portugal (AFP)	Gold	5,000^{‡}
United Kingdom (BPI)	Platinum	600,000^{‡}
United States (RIAA)	3× Platinum	3,000,000^{‡}
^{‡} Sales+streaming figures based on certification alone.

== Release history ==
Region	Date	Format	Version	Label	Ref.
Various	26 June 2019	Digital download; streaming	Original	Polydor	
Italy	5 July 2019	Contemporary hit radio	Original	Universal	
United States	9 July 2019	Contemporary hit radio	Original	Interscope	
Various	16 August 2019	Digital download; streaming	R3HAB Remix	Polydor	
Various	25 September 2019	Digital download; streaming	Snakehips Remix	Polydor	
