= Silk City (duo) =

British-American electronic music superduo

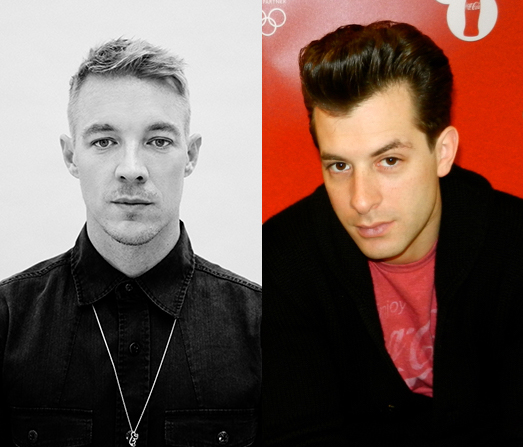
- Diplo (left) and Mark Ronson (right)

Background information
- Genres: EDM; house
- Years active: 2018–present
- Labels: Silk City; Columbia; Sony
- Members: Mark Ronson; Diplo
- Website: www.silk-city.com

Silk City is a British-American superduo composed of electronic music disc jockeys and producers Mark Ronson and Diplo. The duo have collaborated with artists including Dua Lipa, Daniel Merriweather, Mapei, GoldLink, Ellie Goulding and Desiigner.

== History ==
On 2 January 2018, American DJ and record producer Diplo and British-American musician, DJ, songwriter and record producer Mark Ronson, announced a new project entitled Silk City. The duo released their debut single "Only Can Get Better" featuring Daniel Merriweather on May 25, 2018. Their second single, "Feel About You" featuring Mapei, was released on 20 July 2018. The duo's third single, "Loud", saw Diplo reunite with previous collaborators GoldLink and Desiigner.

Their fourth single "Electricity" was released on 6 September 2018 and features English singer and songwriter Dua Lipa. The music video was released on the same day.

On 22 January 2021, Silk City released the single "New Love" featuring English singer-songwriter Ellie Goulding.

== Discography ==
=== Extended plays ===
Title	Details
Electricity	Released: 13 April 2019 (UK); Label: Columbia; Formats: 12" vinyl

=== Singles ===
Title	Year	Peak chart positions								Certifications	Album
Title	Year	UK	AUS	BEL	CAN	GER	IRE	SWE	US	Certifications	Album
"Only Can Get Better" (featuring Daniel Merriweather)	2018	—	—	—	—	—	—	—	—		Electricity
"Feel About You" (featuring Mapei)	2018	—	—	—	—	—	—	—	—		Electricity
"Loud" (with GoldLink and Desiigner)	2018	—	—	—	—	—	—	—	—		Electricity
"Electricity" (Note: "Electricity" is also included on the complete edition of Dua Lipa's first album Dua Lipa.) (with Dua Lipa)	2018	4	22	7	61	64	6	51	62	BPI: Platinum; ARIA: Platinum; BEA: Gold; RIAA: Platinum	Electricity
"New Love" (featuring Ellie Goulding)	2021	65	—	—	—	—	81	—	—		TBA
"—" denotes a recording that did not chart or was not released in that territory.

=== Remixes ===
Title	Artist	Year
"Missing U" (Silk City & Picard Brothers Remix)	Robyn	2019

== Awards and nominations ==
=== Grammy Awards ===
Year	Category	Work	Result
2019	Best Dance Recording	"Electricity"	Won

=== International Dance Music Awards ===
Year	Category	Work	Result
2019	Best Pop/Electronic Song	"Electricity"	Nominated
