= Worry About Me =

Single by Ellie Goulding featuring Blackbear

from the album Brightest Blue
- Released: 13 March 2020
- Genre: Pop; hip-hop
- Length: 2:59
- Label: Polydor
- Songwriters: Ellie Goulding; Ilya Salmanzadeh; Matthew Musto; Peter Svensson; Savan Kotecha
- Producer: Ilya

Ellie Goulding singles chronology
"River" (2019)	"Worry About Me" (2020)	"Power" (2020)

Blackbear singles chronology
"No Service in the Hills" (2020)	"Worry About Me" (2020)	"Monsters" (2020)

Music video
- "Worry About Me" on YouTube

"Worry About Me" is a song by English singer-songwriter Ellie Goulding featuring American rapper and singer Blackbear, released as the lead single from Goulding's fourth studio album Brightest Blue, through Polydor Records on 13 March 2020.

== Critical reception ==
Writing for Idolator, Mike Wass opined that Goulding "asserts her independence" on the track, "telling Mr. Clingy to stop sniffing around her business because she's bus[y] having fun [...] over Ilya's thunderous beats", concluding that it is a "banger". Caian Nunes of Popline wrote that Goulding finds "great inspiration in hip-hop" on the track "without losing her pop [sound]".

== Music video ==
The music video for "Worry About Me" was directed by Emil Nava and was released on Goulding's YouTube channel a few hours after the release of the single. A Director's Cut of the video featuring the instrumental "Overture" was released on 30 April 2020.

== Track listing ==
- Digital download and streaming — Single
1. "Worry About Me" — 2:59
- Digital download and streaming — (Remixes)
1. "Worry About Me" (Lost Frequencies remix) — 4:11
2. "Worry About Me" (MK remix) — 3:33
3. "Worry About Me" (Maya Jane Coles remix) — 4:13
4. "Worry About Me" (Krystal Klear remix) — 6:01

== Personnel ==
Credits were adapted from Apple Music.

- Ellie Goulding — vocals, background vocals, songwriter
- Ilya Salmanzadeh — producer, songwriter, keyboard arranger, engineer, programming, drums, percussion, bass guitar
- Blackbear (a.k.a. Matthew Musto) — vocals, songwriter
- Jason Elliott — recording engineer
- Serban Ghenea — mixing engineer
- John Hanes — assistant mixing engineer
- Randy Merrill — mastering engineer
- Peter Svensson — guitar
- Savan Kotecha — piano
- Leo Kotecha — background vocals
- Mylo Kotecha — background vocals

== Charts ==
Chart (2020)	Peak position
Israel (Media Forest)	5
New Zealand Hot Singles (RMNZ)	16
Romania (Airplay 100)	80
Scottish Singles Sales (Official Charts)	69
UK Singles (Official Charts)	78
US Digital Song Sales (Billboard)	50
US Pop Airplay (Billboard)	33

== Release history ==
Region	Date	Format	Label	Ref.
Various	13 March 2020	Digital download; streaming	Polydor	
Various	15 March 2020	Digital download; streaming	Polydor	
Australia	16 March 2020	Contemporary hit radio	Universal	
Italy	20 March 2020	Contemporary hit radio	Universal	
United States	24 March 2020	Contemporary hit radio	Interscope	
