= New Love (Silk City song) =

Single by Silk City featuring Ellie Goulding
- Released: 21 January 2021
- Length: 3:10
- Label: Silk City; Columbia; Sony
- Songwriters: Clément Picard; Ellie Goulding; Mark Ronson; Maxime Picard; Steve McCutcheon; Thomas Wesley Pentz
- Producers: Alex Metric; Picard Brothers; Riton; Silk City

Silk City singles chronology
"Electricity" (2018)	"New Love" (2021)

Ellie Goulding singles chronology
"Love I'm Given" (2020)	"New Love" (2021)	"Easy Lover" (2022)

"New Love" is a song by British-American superduo Silk City, featuring vocals from English singer Ellie Goulding. It was released as a digital download and for streaming on 21 January 2021. The song was written by Clément Picard, Ellie Goulding, Mark Ronson, Maxime Picard, Steve McCutcheon and Thomas Wesley Pentz.

== Background ==
In a statement, Goulding said, "The song is about losing yourself on your own, not needing to be seen, knowing that the one that got away could be just as happy as this too. The main concept is dancing on your own not needing to be seen. It seemed only right to make a tune together at a time where we all need to dance and be free, even if just in our kitchens." In another statement, Diplo said, "I'm always stoked to get back in the studio with Mark. We've been constantly trading ideas since the start of Silk City and finally found the time to bring some of them to life. We came out with this classic house record and Ellie was kind enough to lend her voice to it." Mark Ronson also said, "I love the music that comes out when Wes and I get together. It has a joy to it that's different from everything else I work on. I've known Ellie for over ten years, and it's great to finally get to make something together. Her voice has such a pure tone that cuts through everything."

== Music video ==
A music video to accompany the release of "New Love" was first released onto YouTube on 22 January 2021. The video was directed by Ana Sting.

== Personnel ==
Credits adapted from Tidal.

- Alex Metric – producer
- Picard Brothers – producer
- Riton – producer
- Silk City – producer, associated performer
- Clément Picard – composer, lyricist
- Ellie Goulding – composer, lyricist, associated performer
- Mark Ronson – composer, lyricist, associated performer, featured artist
- Maxime Picard – composer, lyricist
- Steve McCutcheon – composer, lyricist
- Thomas Wesley Pentz – composer, lyricist, associated performer, featured artist

== Charts ==
=== Weekly charts ===
Weekly chart performance for "New Love"
Chart (2021)	Peak position
Belgium (Ultratip Bubbling Under Flanders)	33
Ireland (IRMA)	81
Japan Hot Overseas (Billboard Japan)	13
Netherlands (Dutch Top 40 Tipparade)	11
New Zealand Hot Singles (RMNZ)	6
UK Singles (Official Charts)	65
US Hot Dance/Electronic Songs (Billboard)	12

=== Year-end charts ===
Year-end chart performance for "New Love"
Chart (2021)	Position
US Hot Dance/Electronic Songs (Billboard)	75

== Release history ==
Release history for "New Love"
Region	Date	Format	Label	Ref
Various	21 January 2021	Digital download; streaming	Silk City; Columbia; Sony	
United Kingdom	12 February 2021	Contemporary hit radio	Columbia	

== See also ==
- List of Billboard number-one dance songs of 2021
