= Close to Me (Ellie Goulding, Diplo and Swae Lee song) =

2018 single by Ellie Goulding, Diplo, and Swae Lee

Single by Ellie Goulding, Diplo and Swae Lee
- Released: 24 October 2018
- Recorded: 2018
- Length: 3:02
- Label: Polydor; Interscope
- Songwriters: Ellie Goulding; Ilya Salmanzadeh; Khalif Brown; Peter Svensson; Savan Kotecha; Thomas Wesley Pentz
- Producers: Ilya; Diplo

Ellie Goulding singles chronology
"First Time" (2017)	"Close to Me" (2018)	"Mama" (2019)

Diplo singles chronology
"Time Is Up" (2018)	"Close to Me" (2018)	"Boom Bye Bye" (2019)

Swae Lee singles chronology
"Sunflower" (2018)	"Close to Me" (2018)	"Arms Around You" (2018)

Music video
- "Close to Me" on YouTube

"Close to Me" is a song by English singer-songwriter Ellie Goulding with American DJ and music producer Diplo and American rapper Swae Lee, released on 24 October 2018 from the former's fourth studio album, Brightest Blue (2020). It was premiered by Annie Mac on BBC Radio 1 as the "Hottest Record in the World".

== Background ==
At the time, there was a lot going on in the world that I wanted to forget. Savan gets very overwhelmed with what's happening particularly in America, and I think we all wanted to forget that and just write something a bit silly. It was so nice to just go back to just writing a song about a turbulent, probably doomed relationship – someone to forget the world with.

— Goulding on the inspiration behind the song.

Goulding told Billboard that the song came about when she and co-writer Savan Kotecha were in a Los Angeles studio where they came up with the guitar melody and Goulding sang what would become the first line of the pre-chorus, "don't let me down", which they decided to keep in the song. Goulding, feeling that the song was "missing something", eventually sent it to Diplo who sent his version back to her within a short amount of time. Diplo suggested adding Swae Lee as a featured guest vocalist.

== Composition ==
The song is recorded in the key of E major with a tempo of 72 beats per minute in common time. The song follows a chord progression of E–C♯m7–G♯–A, and the vocals span from E_{3} to C♯_{5}.

== Music video ==
The music video for "Close to Me", directed by Diane Martel, was filmed in Budapest, Hungary, and premiered on 14 November 2018.

== Promotion ==
Goulding wiped her social media accounts and began promoting the track on 22 October 2018, first sharing a cartoon image of hers, Diplo and Swae Lee's arms locked in a triangle, displaying their tattoos against a cheetah print background, captioning it "CLOSE TO ME". She then later confirmed this would be the title, and along with posting an audio clip of the track, announced the release date and time.

=== Red Velvet remix ===
On 5 April 2019, a remix featuring South Korean girl group Red Velvet was released, which replaces Swae Lee's verse with a version of the verse and chorus sung in Korean and English. Their chorus was written by Red Velvet's Wendy and Yeri. The song won the "Choice Electronic / Dance Song" award at the 2019 Teen Choice Awards. The remix appears as a bonus track on the Japanese edition of Goulding's fourth studio album Brightest Blue (2020).

=== Live performances ===
Goulding performed an acoustic version of the song during On Air with Ryan Seacrest on 16 November 2018. She later performed the song during BBC Radio 1's Live Lounge Month on 28 November. Her first televised performance of the song was on the final of The X Factor on 2 December.

== Charts ==
=== Weekly charts ===
Weekly chart performance
Chart (2018–2019)	Peak position
Australia (ARIA)	25
Austria (Ö3 Austria Top 40)	32
Belgium (Ultratop 50 Flanders)	16
Belgium (Ultratop 50 Wallonia)	4
Bolivia (Monitor Latino)	18
Canada Hot 100 (Billboard)	24
Canada AC (Billboard)	29
Canada CHR/Top 40 (Billboard)	2
Canada Hot AC (Billboard)	2
CIS Airplay (TopHit)	13
Croatia (HRT)	43
Czech Republic Airplay (ČNS IFPI)	4
Czech Republic Singles Digital (ČNS IFPI)	15
Estonia (Eesti Tipp-40)	27
Finland (Suomen virallinen lista)	20
Finnish Airplay (Radiosoittolista)	10
France (SNEP)	91
Germany (GfK)	44
Greece International Digital Singles (IFPI)	52
Hungary (Rádiós Top 40)	13
Hungary (Stream Top 40)	16
Ireland (IRMA)	8
Israel (Media Forest TV Airplay)	1
Italy (FIMI)	56
Lebanon (Lebanese Top 20)	15
Malaysia (RIM)	17
Netherlands (Dutch Top 40)	9
Netherlands (Global Top 40)	28
Netherlands (Single Top 100)	22
New Zealand (Recorded Music NZ)	17
Poland Airplay (ZPAV)	6
Portugal (AFP)	40
Romania (Airplay 100)	63
Russia Airplay (TopHit)	9
Scottish Singles Sales (Official Charts)	22
Singapore (RIAS)	10
Slovakia Airplay (ČNS IFPI)	8
Slovakia Singles Digital (ČNS IFPI)	26
Slovenia (SloTop50)	12
Sweden (Sverigetopplistan)	38
Switzerland (Schweizer Hitparade)	53
UK Singles (Official Charts)	17
US Billboard Hot 100	24
US Adult Contemporary (Billboard)	21
US Adult Pop Airplay (Billboard)	1
US Dance Club Songs (Billboard)	23
US Hot Dance/Electronic Songs (Billboard)	2
US Pop Airplay (Billboard)	2
US Rhythmic Airplay (Billboard)	38
US Radio Songs (Billboard)	5

=== Year-end charts ===
2018 year-end chart performance
Chart (2018)	Position
Netherlands (Dutch Top 40)	84
US Hot Dance/Electronic Songs (Billboard)	92

2019 year-end chart performance
Chart (2019)	Position
Australia (ARIA)	88
Belgium (Ultratop Flanders)	72
Belgium (Ultratop Wallonia)	47
Canada (Canadian Hot 100)	45
CIS (Tophit)	58
Iceland (Tónlistinn)	46
Latvia (LAIPA)	70
Netherlands (Dutch Top 40)	79
Poland (ZPAV)	91
Portugal (AFP)	143
Russia Airplay (Tophit)	51
US Billboard Hot 100	58
US Adult Contemporary (Billboard)	50
US Adult Top 40 (Billboard)	13
US Hot Dance/Electronic Songs (Billboard)	3
US Mainstream Top 40 (Billboard)	18

=== Decade-end charts ===
Decade-end chart performance
Chart (2010–2019)	Position
US Hot Dance/Electronic Songs (Billboard)	17

== Certifications ==
Certifications and sales
Region	Certification	Certified units/sales
Australia (ARIA)	2× Platinum	140,000^{‡}
Belgium (BRMA)	Gold	20,000^{‡}
Brazil (Pro-Música Brasil)	2× Platinum	80,000^{‡}
Canada (Music Canada)	2× Platinum	160,000^{‡}
Denmark (IFPI Danmark)	Gold	45,000^{‡}
France (SNEP)	Gold	100,000^{‡}
Italy (FIMI)	Platinum	50,000^{‡}
New Zealand (RMNZ)	2× Platinum	60,000^{‡}
Poland (ZPAV)	Platinum	20,000^{‡}
United Kingdom (BPI)	Platinum	600,000^{‡}
United States (RIAA)	2× Platinum	2,000,000^{‡}
^{‡} Sales+streaming figures based on certification alone.

== Release history ==
Release dates and formats
Region	Date	Format	Version	Label	Ref.
Italy	26 October 2018	Radio airplay	Original	Universal	
United States	6 November 2018	Contemporary hit radio	Original	Interscope	
Various	1 February 2019	Digital download; streaming	The Remixes	Interscope	
Various	5 April 2019	Digital download; streaming	Red Velvet Remix	Polydor	
