= Lauv discography =

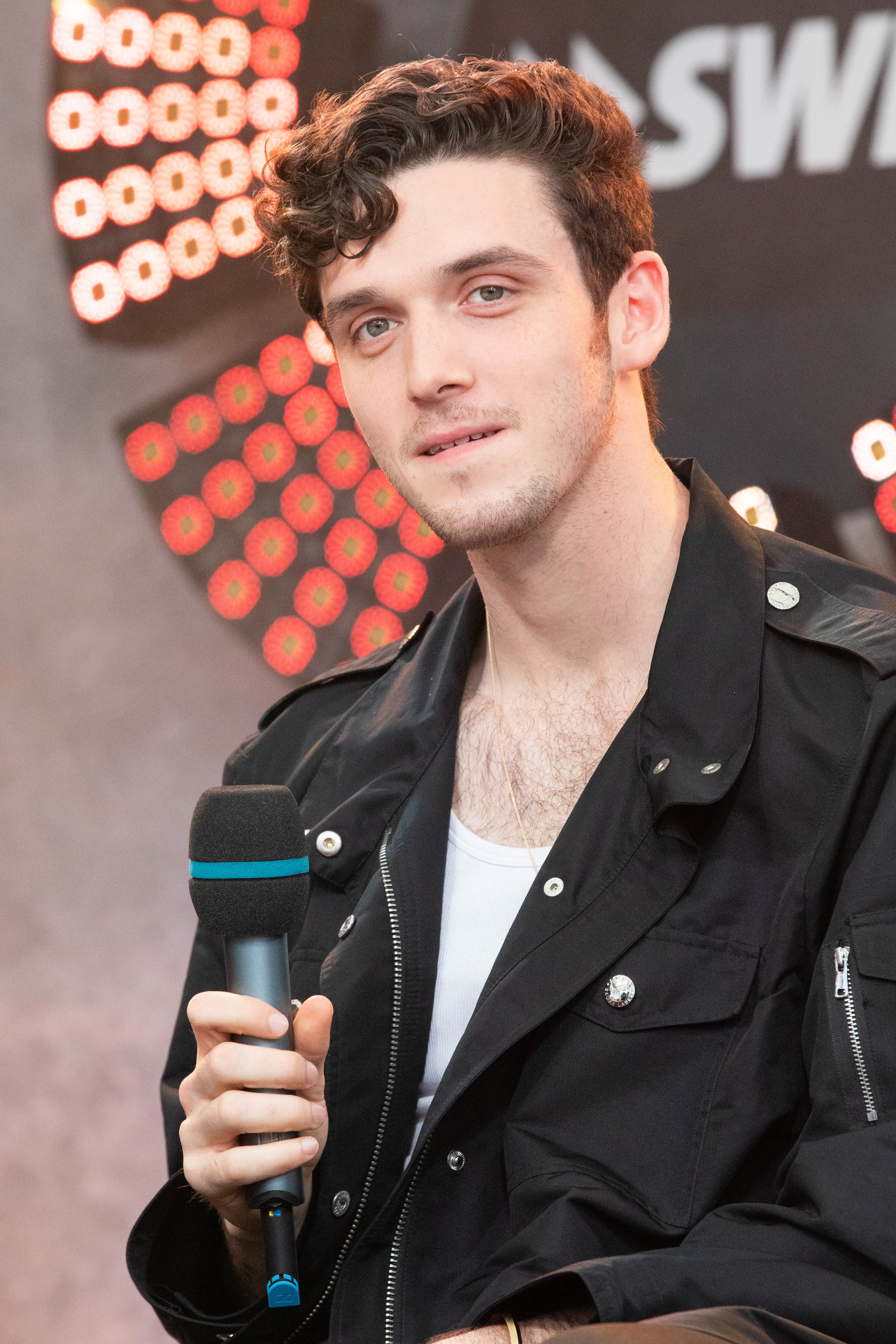
- Lauv at the SWR3 New Pop Festival 2018
- Studio albums: 2
- EPs: 10
- Compilation albums: 1
- Singles: 30
- Remix albums: 2
- Promotional singles: 3

American musician Lauv has released two studio albums, one compilation album, two remix albums, ten extended plays, 30 singles (including five as a featured artist), and three promotional singles.

== Albums ==
=== Studio albums ===
Title	Details	Peak chart positions										Certifications
Title	Details	US	AUS	AUT	BEL (FL)	CAN	GER	IRE	NLD	NZ	UK	Certifications
How I'm Feeling	Released: March 6, 2020; Label: AWAL; Formats: LP, CD, cassette, digital download, streaming	16	5	10	8	11	27	22	13	6	9	RIAA: Gold; MC: Gold; BPI: Silver; RMNZ: Platinum
All 4 Nothing	Released: August 5, 2022; Label: Virgin Music Label & Artist Services; Formats: LP, CD, digital download, streaming	82	—	—	—	—	—	—	—	—	—	

=== Compilation albums ===
Title	Details	Peak chart positions						Certifications
Title	Details	US	US Ind.	AUS	BEL (FL)	CAN	NLD	Certifications
I Met You When I Was 18 (The Playlist)	Released: May 31, 2018; Label: AWAL; Formats: LP, CD, digital download, streaming	50	30	64	77	40	105	RIAA: Gold; BPI: Silver

=== Remix albums ===
Title	Details
I Met You When I Was 18 (The Extras)	Released: May 31, 2018; Label: AWAL; Formats: Digital download, streaming
How I'm Feeling (The Extras)	Released: March 6, 2020; Label: AWAL; Formats: Digital download, streaming

== Extended plays ==
Title	Details
Lost in the Light	Released: October 3, 2015; Label: AWAL; Formats: Streaming
Spotify Singles	Released: July 19, 2017; Formats: Streaming
Lauv EP	Released: October 25, 2017 (Japan); Label: AWAL; Formats: CD, Digital download
Night Vibes	Released: May 29, 2020; Label: AWAL, Lauv; Formats: Digital download, streaming
Lonely	Released: May 29, 2020; Label: AWAL, Lauv; Formats: Digital download, streaming
Driving Vibes	Released: June 3, 2020; Label: AWAL, Lauv; Formats: Digital download, streaming
Party Vibes	Released: June 4, 2020; Label: AWAL, Lauv; Formats: Digital download, streaming
I Miss You	Released: June 9, 2020; Label: AWAL, Lauv; Formats: Digital download, streaming
Work Out W Lauv	Released: June 11, 2020; Label: AWAL, Lauv; Formats: Digital download, streaming
Without You	Released: June 24, 2020; Label: AWAL, Lauv; Formats: Digital download, streaming
Songs I Couldn't Forget	Released: February 27, 2026; Label: AWAL, Lauv; Formats: Digital download, streaming

== Singles ==
=== As lead artist ===
Title	Year	Peak chart positions										Certifications	Album
Title	Year	US	AUS	BEL (FL)	CAN	GER	IRE	NZ	SWE	SWI	UK	Certifications	Album
"The Other"	2015	—	—	—	—	—	—	—	—	—	—	RIAA: Gold; ARIA: Gold; MC: Gold; RMNZ: Gold	I Met You When I Was 18 (The Playlist)
"Reforget"	2015	—	—	—	—	—	—	—	—	—	—		I Met You When I Was 18 (The Playlist)
"Question" (featuring Travis Mills)	2016	—	—	—	—	—	—	—	—	—	—		I Met You When I Was 18 (The Playlist)
"Breathe"	2016	—	—	—	—	—	—	—	—	—	—		I Met You When I Was 18 (The Playlist)
"The Story Never Ends"	2016	—	—	—	—	—	—	—	—	—	—		I Met You When I Was 18 (The Playlist)
"I Like Me Better"	2017	27	8	30	62	7	33	13	25	23	58	RIAA: 5× Platinum; ARIA: 7× Platinum; BPI: Platinum; BRMA: Platinum; BVMI: Platinum; GLF: 2× Platinum; MC: 4× Platinum; RMNZ: 7× Platinum	I Met You When I Was 18 (The Playlist)
"Easy Love"	2017	—	—	—	—	—	—	— (Note: "Easy Love" did not enter the NZ Top 40 Singles Chart, but peaked at number five on the NZ Heatseeker Singles Chart.)	— (Note: "Easy Love" did not enter the Swedish Singellista Chart, but peaked at number 12 on the Swedish Heatseekers Chart.)	—	—		I Met You When I Was 18 (The Playlist)
"Paris in the Rain"	2017	—	—	—	—	—	—	—	—	—	—	ARIA: Gold; RMNZ: Gold	I Met You When I Was 18 (The Playlist)
"Getting Over You"	2018	—	—	—	—	—	—	—	— (Note: "Getting Over You" did not enter the Swedish Singles Chart, but peaked at number 20 on the Swedish Heatseekers chart.)	—	—		I Met You When I Was 18 (The Playlist)
"Chasing Fire"	2018	—	94	—	—	—	67	—	—	—	—	ARIA: Gold; RMNZ: Gold	I Met You When I Was 18 (The Playlist)
"Superhero"	2018	—	—	—	—	—	—	— (Note: "Superhero" did not enter the NZ Top 40 Singles Chart, but peaked at number 19 on the NZ Hot Singles Chart.)	— (Note: "Superhero" did not enter the Swedish Singellista Chart, but peaked at number two on the Swedish Heatseeker Chart.)	—	—	ARIA: Gold	Non-album singles
"There's No Way" (featuring Julia Michaels)	2018	— (Note: "There's No Way" did not enter the Billboard Hot 100, but peaked at number 33 on the Digital Song Sales chart.)	37	— (Note: "There's No Way" did not enter the Ultratop chart, but peaked at number seventeen on the Belgian Flanders Ultratip Singles Chart.)	—	—	55	— (Note: "There's No Way" did not enter the NZ Top 40 Singles Chart, but peaked at number 10 on the NZ Hot Singles Chart.)	94	86	—	RIAA: Gold; ARIA: Platinum; RMNZ: Platinum	Non-album singles
"I'm So Tired..." (with Troye Sivan)	2019	81	11	37	57	42	4	9	37	40	8	RIAA: 2× Platinum; ARIA: 3× Platinum; BPI: Platinum; BRMA: Gold; BVMI: Gold; MC: Platinum; RMNZ: 2× Platinum	How I'm Feeling
"Drugs & the Internet"	2019	—	—	—	—	—	57	— (Note: "Drugs & the Internet" did not enter the NZ Top 40 Singles Chart, but peaked at number 11 on the NZ Hot Singles Chart.)	— (Note: "Drugs & the Internet" did not enter the Swedish Singellista Chart, but peaked at number 18 on the Swedish Heatseeker Chart.)	—	—		How I'm Feeling
"Sad Forever"	2019	—	—	—	—	—	—	— (Note: "Sad Forever" did not enter the NZ Top 40 Singles Chart, but peaked at number 18 on the NZ Hot Singles Chart.)	—	—	—		How I'm Feeling
"Fuck, I'm Lonely" (featuring Anne-Marie) (Note: "Fuck, I'm Lonely" also appears on the soundtrack to 13 Reasons Why: Season 3.)	2019	— (Note: "Fuck, I'm Lonely" did not enter the Billboard Hot 100, but peaked at number eight on the Bubbling Under Hot 100 chart.)	19	21	70	80	15	20	49	53	32	RIAA: Gold; ARIA: 2× Platinum; BPI: Gold; RMNZ: Platinum	How I'm Feeling
"Feelings"	2019	— (Note: "Feelings" did not enter the Billboard Hot 100, but peaked at number 26 on the Digital Song Sales chart.)	53	—	—	—	80	— (Note: "Feelings" did not enter the NZ Top 40 Singles Chart, but peaked at number two on the NZ Hot Singles Chart.)	— (Note: "Feelings" did not enter the Swedish Singellista Chart, but peaked at number 17 on the Swedish Heatseeker Chart.)	—	—	ARIA: Platinum; RMNZ: Gold	How I'm Feeling
"Sims"	2019	—	—	—	—	—	—	— (Note: "Sims" did not enter the NZ Top 40 Singles Chart, but peaked at number 18 on the NZ Hot Singles Chart.)	— (Note: "Sims" did not enter the Swedish Singellista Chart, but peaked at number nine on the Swedish Heatseeker Chart.)	—	—		How I'm Feeling
"Mean It" (with LANY)	2019	— (Note: "Mean It" did not enter the Billboard Hot 100, but peaked at number nineteen on the Bubbling Under Hot 100 chart.)	42	— (Note: "Mean It" did not enter the Ultratop chart, but peaked at number thirty-two on the Belgian Flanders Ultratip Singles Chart.)	—	—	46	— (Note: "Mean It" did not enter the NZ Top 40 Singles Chart, but peaked at number four on the NZ Hot Singles Chart.)	— (Note: "Mean It" did not enter the Swedish Singellista Chart, but peaked at number 12 on the Swedish Heatseeker Chart.)	87	83	RIAA: Gold; ARIA: Gold; RMNZ: Gold	How I'm Feeling
"Changes"	2020	—	—	—	—	—	—	— (Note: "Changes" did not enter the NZ Top 40 Singles Chart, but peaked at number 14 on the NZ Hot Singles Chart.)	—	—	—		How I'm Feeling
"Tattoos Together"	2020	—	—	— (Note: "Tattoos Together" did not enter the Ultratop chart, but peaked at number twelve on the Belgian Flanders Ultratip Singles Chart.)	—	—	—	— (Note: "Tattoos Together" did not enter the NZ Top 40 Singles Chart, but peaked at number 22 on the NZ Hot Singles Chart.)	—	—	—	ARIA: Gold; RMNZ: Gold	How I'm Feeling
"Modern Loneliness"	2020	— (Note: "Modern Loneliness" did not enter the Billboard Hot 100, but peaked at number fourteen on the Bubbling Under Hot 100 chart.)	—	— (Note: "Modern Loneliness" did not enter the Ultratop chart, but peaked at number ten on the Belgian Flanders Ultratip Singles Chart.)	—	—	90	— (Note: "Modern Loneliness" did not enter the NZ Top 40 Singles Chart, but peaked at number 13 on the NZ Hot Singles Chart.)	—	—	—		How I'm Feeling
"Dishes"	2020	—	—	—	—	—	—	—	—	—	—		Without You
"Fake" (with Conan Gray)	2020	—	—	—	—	—	—	— (Note: "Fake" did not enter the NZ Top 40 Singles Chart, but peaked at number six on the NZ Hot Singles Chart.)	—	—	— (Note: "Fake" did not enter the UK Singles Chart, but peaked at number 48 on the UK Independent Singles Chart.)		Non-album singles
"2021"	2020	—	—	—	—	—	—	— (Note: "2021" did not enter the NZ Top 40 Singles Chart, but peaked at number three on the NZ Hot Singles Chart.)	—	—	—		Non-album singles
"26"	2022	—	—	—	—	—	—	— (Note: "26" did not enter the NZ Top 40 Singles Chart, but peaked at number 20 on the NZ Hot Singles Chart.)	—	—	—		All 4 Nothing
"All 4 Nothing (I'm So in Love)"	2022	—	—	—	—	—	—	— (Note: "All 4 Nothing (I'm So in Love)" did not enter the NZ Top 40 Singles Chart, but peaked at number 20 on the NZ Hot Singles Chart.)	—	—	—		All 4 Nothing
"Kids Are Born Stars"	2022	—	—	—	—	—	—	— (Note: "Kids Are Born Stars" did not enter the NZ Top 40 Singles Chart, but peaked at number 37 on the NZ Hot Singles Chart.)	—	—	—		All 4 Nothing
"Steal the Show"	2023	—	—	—	—	—	—	— (Note: "Steal the Show" did not enter the NZ Top 40 Singles Chart, but peaked at number 37 on the NZ Hot Singles Chart.)	—	—	—	RIAA: Gold	Elemental
"Love U Like That"	2023	—	—	—	—	—	—	— (Note: "Love U Like That" did not enter the NZ Top 40 Singles Chart, but peaked at number 11 on the NZ Hot Singles Chart.)	—	—	—		TBA
"Crush" (with Bella Poarch)	2023	—	—	—	—	—	—	— (Note: "Crush" did not enter the NZ Top 40 Singles Chart, but peaked at number 35 on the NZ Hot Singles Chart.)	—	—	—		TBA
"Potential"	2024	—	—	—	—	—	—	—	—	—	—		TBA
"Cozy" (with Jeremy Zucker and Alexander 23)	2024	—	—	—	—	—	—	—	—	—	—		Non-album single
"First Heartbreak"	2024	—	—	—	—	—	—	—	—	—	—		TBA
"Because of You"	2024	—	—	—	—	—	—	—	—	—	—		TBA
"Mad" (with Martin Garrix)	2025	—	—	34	—	—	—	— (Note: "Mad" did not enter the NZ Top 40 Singles Chart, but peaked at number 28 on the NZ Hot Singles Chart.)	—	—	—		TBA
"Combust"	2025	—	—	—	—	—	—	—	—	—	—		TBA
"Tied Up" (with Khalid)	2026	—	—	—	—	—	—	—	—	—	—		Non-album single
"Pretty Little Things"	2026	—	—	—	—	—	—	—	—	—	—		TBA
"Don't You Know"	2026	—	—	—	—	—	—	—	—	—	—		TBA
"Guts"	2026	—	—	—	—	—	—	—	—	—	—		TBA
"—" denotes a recording that did not chart or was not released in that territory.

=== As featured artist ===
Title	Year	Peak chart positions										Certifications	Album
Title	Year	US	AUS	BEL (FL)	CAN	CHN (Note: The Billboard China Top 100 was launched in January 2019 by Billboard China. It was last published on 6 September 2019.)	IRE	NZ	SWE	SWI	UK	Certifications	Album
"A Different Way" (DJ Snake featuring Lauv)	2017	— (Note: "A Different Way" did not enter the Billboard Hot 100, but peaked at number 23 on the Bubbling Under Hot 100 chart.)	59	— (Note: "A Different Way" did not enter the Ultratop chart, but peaked at number one on the Belgian Flanders Ultratip Singles Chart.)	78	—	72	— (Note: "A Different Way" did not enter the NZ Top 40 Singles Chart, but peaked at number five on the NZ Heatseeker Singles Chart.)	65	63	85	RIAA: Gold; ARIA: Platinum; MC: Platinum; RMNZ: Gold	Non-album single
"Make It Right" (BTS featuring Lauv)	2019	76	53	—	65	—	—	—	—	—	—	ARIA: Gold	Map of the Soul: Persona and Map of the Soul: 7
"Dil Na Jaaneya" (Rochak Kohli featuring Lauv and Akasa)	2019	—	—	—	—	—	—	—	—	—	—		Good Newwz
"Slow Grenade" (Ellie Goulding featuring Lauv)	2020	— (Note: "Slow Grenade" did not enter the Hot 100, but peaked at number 31 on the Digital Songs chart.)	—	—	—	—	—	— (Note: "Slow Grenade" did not enter the NZ Top 40 Singles Chart, but peaked at number 12 on the NZ Hot Singles Chart.)	—	—	—		Brightest Blue
"Kings & Queens, Pt. 2" (Ava Max featuring Lauv and Saweetie)	2020	—	—	—	—	—	—	—	—	—	—		Non-album singles
"Sweet & Sour" (Jawsh 685 featuring Lauv and Tyga)	2020	—	—	—	—	—	—	8	89	—	—	RMNZ: Platinum	Non-album singles
"Stop Crying Your Heart Out" (as BBC Radio 2's Allstars)	2020	—	—	—	—	—	—	—	—	—	7		Non-album singles
"Try Again" (DallasK featuring Lauv)	2021	—	—	—	—	—	—	— (Note: "Try Again" did not enter the NZ Top 40 Singles Chart, but peaked at number 27 on the NZ Hot Singles Chart.)	—	—	—		Non-album singles
"Run Back to You" (Lay Zhang featuring Lauv)	2024	—	—	—	—	3	—	—	—	—	—		TBA
"—" denotes a recording that did not chart or was not released in that territory.

=== Promotional singles ===
Title	Year	Album
"Bracelet"	2018	I Met You When I Was 18 (The Playlist)
"Paranoid"	2018	I Met You When I Was 18 (The Playlist)
"If I Were U" (with Blackbear)	2020	Everything Means Nothing

== Other charted and certified songs ==
Title	Year	Peak chart positions							Certifications	Album
Title	Year	US Dig.	CAN Dig.	MLY	NZ Hot	SCO	SGP	UK Indie	Certifications	Album
"Enemies"	2018	—	—	—	—	—	—	—	ARIA: Gold	I Met You When I Was 18 (The Playlist)
"Lonely Eyes"	2020	—	—	—	30	—	—	—		How I'm Feeling
"Who" (featuring BTS)	2020	14	24	5	11	43	5	16		How I'm Feeling
"Invisible Things"	2020	—	—	—	9	—	—	—		How I'm Feeling
"Love Like That"	2020	40	—	—	17	—	—	—		How I'm Feeling: The Extras
"Stranger"	2022	—	—	—	21	—	—	—		All 4 Nothing

== Songwriting credits ==
Year	Title	Artist(s)	Album
2015	"Faking It"	Olivia Noelle	Non-album singles
2016	"Broken"	Tritonal & Jenaux featuring Adam Lambert	Non-album singles
2016	"No Party"	Daniel Skye	Non-album singles
2016	"Plastic"	Laura Roy	Laura Roy
2016	"Because of Me"	Billy Gilman	The Complete Season 11 Collection (The Voice Performance)
2017	"All My Love"	Cash Cash featuring Conor Maynard	Non-album singles
2017	"Boys"	Charli XCX	Non-album singles
2017	"No Promises"	Cheat Codes featuring Demi Lovato	Non-album singles
2017	"Sorry for Myself"	CADE	Non-album singles
2017	"Made of Gold"	Olivia Noelle	Non-album singles
2017	"How Was I"	Jessica Jarrell	Non-album singles
2017	"Idea of You"	Arty featuring Eric Nam	Non-album singles
2017	"Beg"	Jack & Jack	Non-album singles
2017	"Cross Your Mind"	Wingtip featuring morgxn	Non-album singles
2017	"Never Loved Me"	Griffin Oskar	Hostage
2018	"High for Me"	Olivia Noelle featuring Kid Ink	If Boys Could Cry
2018	"Fck Around & Fall in Luv"	Olivia Noelle	If Boys Could Cry
2019	"Hundred"	Khalid	Free Spirit
2019	"Nobody Else"	Backstreet Boys	DNA
2019	"Runaway"	Eric Nam	Non-album single
2019	"Imperfections"	Celine Dion	Courage
2019	"You Win"	Olivia Noelle	Non-album singles
2020	"Don't Mind"	Louis The Child	Non-album singles
2023	"This Moment"	Mimi Webb	Ruby Gillman, Teenage Kraken
2024	"Novacaine"	Key	Pleasure Shop

== Music videos ==
Title	Year	Director
"The Other"	2017	Andy Deluca
"I Like Me Better"	2017	Alex Di Marco
"Easy Love"	2017	Spencer Graves
"Paris in the Rain"	2017	Chase Smith
"Superhero"	2018	Spencer Graves
"There's No Way" (ft. Julia Michaels)	2018	Malia James
"I'm So Tired..." (with Troye Sivan)	2019	DAD®
"Drugs & The Internet"	2019	Jenna Marsh
"Sad Forever"	2019	Jenna Marsh
"Fuck, I'm Lonely" (with Anne-Marie)	2019	Jenna Marsh
"Mean It" (with LANY)	2019	Phillip Lopez
"Changes"	2020	Adinah Dancyger
"Tattoos Together"	2020	Declan Whitebloom
"Modern Loneliness"	2020	Jason Lester
"El Tejano" (feat. Sofía Reyes)	2020	KID. Studio
"Dishes"	2020	Unknown
"Love Somebody"	2020	Hunter Lyon
