= Ritviz =

Indian singer-songwriter

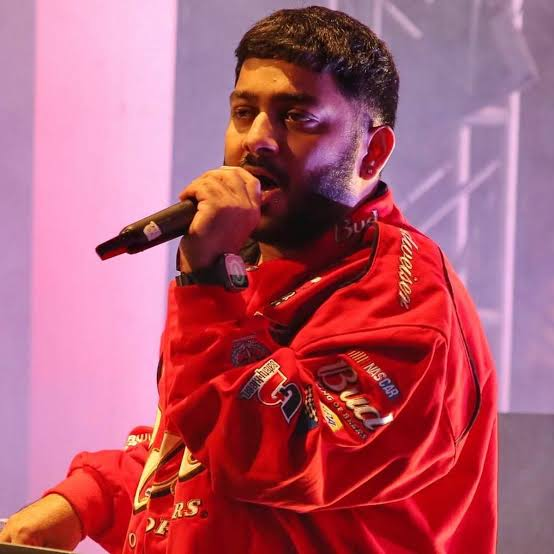
- Ritviz performing in 2023

Background information
- Also known as: Vizdumb
- Born: Ritviz Srivastava; Darbhanga, Bihar, India
- Genres: Indian pop; Electronic dance music; Classical
- Occupations: Musician; Singer-songwriter; Producer; DJ
- Years active: 2013–present

Ritviz Srivastava is an Indian singer-songwriter, electronic musician and record producer from Pune, Maharashtra, India. He rose to prominence after his song "Udd Gaye" was featured on A.I.B.'s official YouTube channel after becoming the winner of the 2017 Bacardi House Party Sessions, a talent hunt competition organised by A.I.B. and Nucleya.

Ritviz composed the title track of the Amazon Prime Video show Comicstaan, appeared on the soundtrack of the Netflix series Mismatched with "Sun Toh", and his music has been featured in the Marvel series Ms. Marvel.

He was featured on Forbes India's 30 Under 30 list and on one of the digital covers of the Grazia India's Cool List in 2021.

== Early life ==
Ritviz Srivastava was born in Darbhanga, Bihar. He grew up in Pune. He started learning music when he was 8 years old, and went on to be tutored by Uday Bhawalkar in the Dhrupad subgenre of Hindustani Music. He composed his first song at the age of 11.

== Career ==
Following the release of his debut EP, Yuv in 2016, Ritviz released his second EP, Ved, three years later, which was preceded by the hit single "Udd Gaye", whose music video was released through AIB's YouTube channel. He then made a remix version of Nucleya's track "Lights", from the 2016 album "Raja Baja", a remix of Major Lazer's "Light It Up", of which Ritviz made the Diwali version which features his voice as well as production in 2019. Ritviz also collaborated with Seedhe Maut on the track "Chalo Chalein" for the Bacardi Sessions in 2019, which received rave reviews. In an interview with The Bridge Chronicle, they even teased a collaboration album with the singer, but it never saw the light of day and was eventually scrapped. In May 2020, he was featured on the remix of Lauv's "Modern Loneliness". In the following year, Ritviz released another EP, Dev, preceded by "Liggi", he then followed it up with a collaborative EP, Baaraat, along with Nucleya. The four track EP was accompanied by a series of NFT.

Ritviz has performed at EDC Las Vegas, Sunburn Festival, the Bacardi NH7 Weekender, Zomaland by Zomato and YouTube Fanfest. He opened for Katy Perry and Dua Lipa at the OnePlus Music Festival at DY Patil Stadium in 2019.

In July 2022, Ritviz announced that his debut album, Mimmi would be releasing on September 2, 2022. The album was named after and dedicated to his mother, who also helped co-writing the songs. After the release of his debut album, Ritviz embarked on his Mimmi Album Launch Tour throughout 2023.

On June 21, 2024, Ritviz released the single "Mehrbaan" featuring Pakistani singer Hasan Raheem.

== Discography ==
=== Albums and EPs ===
| Year | Album / EP | Track | Artist(s) |
|---|---|---|---|
| 2016 | Yuv | Bali | Ritviz |
| 2016 | Yuv | Taan | Ritviz |
| 2016 | Yuv | Yuv | Ritviz |
| 2016 | Yuv | Jiti | Ritviz |
| 2017-2019 | Ved | Udd Gaye | Ritviz |
| 2017-2019 | Ved | Jeet | Ritviz |
| 2017-2019 | Ved | Barso | Ritviz |
| 2017-2019 | Ved | Ved | Ritviz |
| 2017-2019 | Ved | Jeet 2.0 | Ritviz |
| 2017-2019 | Ved | Sage | Ritviz |
| 2019-2021 | Dev | Chalo Chalein | Ritviz ft. Seedhe Maut |
| 2019-2021 | Dev | Liggi | Ritviz |
| 2019-2021 | Dev | Raahi | Ritviz |
| 2019-2021 | Dev | Thandi Hawa | Ritviz |
| 2019-2021 | Dev | Pran | Ritviz |
| 2019-2021 | Dev | Khamoshi | Ritviz & Karan Kanchan |
| 2020 | Thandi Hawa (Official Remixes) | Thandi Hawa (Sez on the Beat & Enkore Remix) | Ritviz |
| 2020 | Thandi Hawa (Official Remixes) | Thandi Hawa (Anish Sood Remix) | Ritviz |
| 2020 | Thandi Hawa (Official Remixes) | Thandi Hawa (Nucleya Remix) | Ritviz |
| 2020 | Thandi Hawa (Official Remixes) | Thandi Hawa (Zupiter Remix) | Ritviz |
| 2021 | Baaraat | Sathi | Ritviz & Nucleya |
| 2021 | Baaraat | Ari Ari | Ritviz & Nucleya |
| 2021 | Baaraat | Roz | Ritviz & Nucleya |
| 2021 | Baaraat | Baaraat | Ritviz & Nucleya |
| 2022 | Mimmi | Aaj Na | Ritviz |
| 2022 | Mimmi | Mehfooz | Ritviz |
| 2022 | Mimmi | Mimmi | Ritviz |
| 2022 | Mimmi | Chandamama | Ritviz |
| 2022 | Mimmi | Taj | Ritviz |
| 2022 | Mimmi | Jaana | Ritviz & Karan Kanchan |
| 2022 | Mimmi | Pukaar | Ritviz |
| 2022 | Mimmi | Aas Paas | Ritviz |

=== Singles and collaborations ===
| Year | Track | Artist(s) | Album / Compilation |
|---|---|---|---|
| 2013 | Teenage Sound | Ritviz | |
| 2014 | Vizdumb | Ritviz | |
| 2014 | Beatific | Ritviz | |
| 2014 | I Feel Love | Ritviz | |
| 2015 | Mukti | Ritviz | dimmSummer Presents: Revolution Rising Volume 2 |
| 2016 | Turn Up | Su Real ft. Ritviz | Twerkistan by Su Real |
| 2016 | Lights (Ritviz Remix) | Nucleya & Ritviz | |
| 2019 | Light It Up (Ritviz Diwali Edition) | Major Lazer & Ritviz ft. Nyla & Fuse ODG | |
| 2020 | Modern Loneliness (Ritviz Remix) | Lauv & Ritviz | How I'm Feeling (The Extras) by Lauv |
| 2020 | Roshni | SickFlip & Ritviz ft. Seedhe Maut | |
| 2024 | Mehrbaan | Ritviz & Hasan Raheem | |

=== Web series soundtracks ===
| Year | Series | Song | Artist(s) |
|---|---|---|---|
| 2018 | Comicstaan | Comicstaan Title Track | Ritviz |
| 2020 | Mismatched | Sun Toh | Ritviz |
| 2022 | Ms. Marvel | Sage | Ritviz |
| 2022 | Ms. Marvel | Thandi Hawa | Ritviz |
| 2022 | Ms. Marvel | Aavegi | Ritviz |
