= All 4 Nothing =

Studio album by Lauv
- Released: August 5, 2022
- Length: 36:59
- Label: A5B
- Producer: John Cunningham; Digi; Simon Says; Lauv; DallasK; Yakob; Ryan OG; Cirkut; Blake Slatkin; Guy Lawrence

Lauv chronology
| Without You (2020) | All 4 Nothing (2022) | Songs I Couldn't Forget (2026) |

Singles from All 4 Nothing
- 1. "26" Released: January 18, 2022; 2. "All 4 Nothing (I'm So in Love)" Released: April 8, 2022; 3. "Kids Are Born Stars" Released: June 28, 2022; 4. "Stranger" Released: August 5, 2022

Professional ratings
Aggregate scores
| Source | Rating |
|---|---|
| Metacritic | 67/100 |
Review scores
| Source | Rating |
| The Guardian | 3/5 stars |
| The Line of Best Fit | 8/10 |
| NME | 3/5 stars |
| Rolling Stone | 3.5/5 stars |

All 4 Nothing is the second studio album by American singer-songwriter Lauv. It was released on August 5, 2022, by A5B, Inc through Virgin Music Label & Artist Services. It is the follow-up to his debut studio album, How I'm Feeling (2020). The album was supported by the release of four singles: "26", "All 4 Nothing (I'm So In Love)", "Kids Are Born Stars" and "Stranger". The album was released to positive reviews from music critics.

== Background ==
In January 2022, Lauv posted a video to his social media pages to indicate his second album was complete, with the first single, "26", being released on January 28. In an interview with Rolling Stone, Lauv stated: "[I was] rethinking a lot of things in my life, finding balance, and revisiting childhood and my innate light. I felt like I had lost touch with it before, so thank God for therapy and meditation and the fact that I was able to make this album."

== Track listing ==
All 4 Nothing track listing
| No. | Title | Writer(s) | Producer(s) | Length |
|---|---|---|---|---|
| 1. | "26" | Ari Leff; Sophie Cates; John Cunningham; Jamil Chammas; Simon Rosen; Ryan Ogren | Lauv; Cunningham; Digi; Simon Says; Ryan OG | 2:39 |
| 2. | "Stranger" | Leff; Dallas Koehlke; Joshua Coleman; Cunningham | Lauv; Cunningham; DallasK | 2:43 |
| 3. | "Kids Are Born Stars" | Leff; Jakob Rabitsch; Sylvester Sivertsen | Cunningham; Sly; Yakob | 3:00 |
| 4. | "Molly in Mexico" | Leff; Cunningham; Chammas; Rosen | Cunningham; Digi; Simon Says | 3:00 |
| 5. | "All 4 Nothing (I'm So in Love)" | Leff; Cates; Koehlke; Henry Walter | DallasK; Cirkut | 3:02 |
| 6. | "Stay Together" | Leff; Madison Love; Blake Slatkin; Cunningham | Cunningham; Slatkin | 2:20 |
| 7. | "Summer Nights" | Rabitsch; Guy Lawrence | Yakob; Lawrence | 2:36 |
| 8. | "Time After Time" | Leff; Love; Jacob Kasher Hindlin; Cunningham; David Biral; Denzel Baptiste | Cunningham | 2:27 |
| 9. | "Hey Ari" | Leff; Cunningham | Cunningham | 2:47 |
| 10. | "Better Than This" | Leff; Chammas; Rosen | Digi; Simon Says | 3:32 |
| 11. | "Bad Trip" | Leff; Cunningham | Cunningham | 2:46 |
| 12. | "I (Don't) Have a Problem" | Leff; Cunningham | Cunningham | 2:27 |
| 13. | "First Grade" | Leff; Cunningham | Cunningham | 3:40 |
| Total length: | | | | 36:59 |

All 4 Nothing – Target and HMV bonus track
| No. | Title | Writer(s) | Producer(s) | Length |
|---|---|---|---|---|
| 14. | "Forever" | Leff; Michael Pollack; Koehlke; Jacob Torrey | Lauv; DallasK | 2:43 |
| Total length: | | | | 39:42 |

All 4 Nothing – Japanese and Taiwanese Bonus Track
| No. | Title | Length |
|---|---|---|
| 15. | "Forever" | 2:35 |
| Total length: | | 43:00 |

== Charts ==
Chart performance for All 4 Nothing
| Chart (2022) | Peak position |
|---|---|
| Australian Physical Albums (ARIA) | 59 |
| Scottish Albums (OCC) | 82 |
| UK Albums Sales (OCC) | 23 |
| US Billboard 200 | 82 |

== All 4 Nothing Tour ==
| Date | City | Country | Venue |
Leg 1 – North America
| August 11, 2022 | Minneapolis | United States | Armory |
| August 12, 2022 | Chicago | United States | Aragon Ballroom |
| August 13, 2022 | Rochester Hills | United States | Meadow Brook Amphitheatre |
| August 15, 2022 | Toronto | Canada | RBC Echo Beach |
| August 16, 2022 | Laval | Canada | Place Bell |
| August 17, 2022 | Boston | United States | Leader Bank Pavilion |
| August 19, 2022 | Philadelphia | United States | Metropolitan Opera House |
| August 20, 2022 | Pittsburgh | United States | Stage AE |
| August 21, 2022 | Cincinnati | United States | ICON Festival Stage |
| August 23, 2022 | Columbus | United States | KEMBA Live! |
| August 25, 2022 | Washington, D.C. | United States | The Anthem |
| August 26, 2022 | New York City | United States | Hammerstein Ballroom |
| August 27, 2022 | New York City | United States | Hammerstein Ballroom |
| August 28, 2022 | Asbury Park | United States | Stone Pony |
| August 30, 2022 | Charlotte | United States | Charlotte Metro Credit Union Amphitheatre |
| August 31, 2022 | Atlanta | United States | Coca-Cola Roxy Theatre |
| September 1, 2022 | Nashville | United States | Ryman Auditorium |
| September 3, 2022 | Houston | United States | 713 Music Hall |
| September 4, 2022 | Irving | United States | Toyota Music Factory |
| September 6, 2022 | Denver | United States | Mission Ballroom |
| September 7, 2022 | Ogden | United States | Ogden Amphitheatre |
| September 9, 2022 | Los Angeles | United States | Greek Theatre |
| September 11, 2022 | San Diego | United States | Cal Coast Credit Union Open Air Theatre at SDSU |
| September 12, 2022 | Phoenix | United States | Arizona Federal Theatre |
| September 15, 2022 | Berkeley | United States | Hearst Greek Theatre |
| September 17, 2022 | Vancouver | Canada | Doug Mitchell Thunderbird Sports Centre |
| September 20, 2022 | Portland | United States | WaMu Theater |
Leg 2 – Asia
| August 19, 2023 | Osaka | Japan | Maishima |
| August 20, 2023 | Chiba | Japan | Makuhari Messe |
| August 23, 2023 | Hong Kong | China | AsiaWorld–Expo |
| August 26, 2023 | Bangkok | Thailand | Queen Sirikit National Convention Center |
| August 29, 2023 | Seoul | South Korea | Olympic Gymnastics Arena |
| August 31, 2023 | Taipei | Taiwan | Taipei Nangang Exhibition Center |
| September 3, 2023 | Jakarta | Indonesia | Eco Park Ancol |
| September 5, 2023 | Singapore | | Singapore Indoor Stadium |
| September 7, 2023 | Kaohsiung | Taiwan | Kaohsiung Arena |
| September 9, 2023 | Cebu | Philippines | Waterfront Cebu City Hotel & Casino |
| September 11, 2023 | Manila | Philippines | SM Mall of Asia Arena |
| September 15, 2023 | Chengdu | China | EUMC |
| September 17, 2023 | Foshan | China | GBA International Sports and Cultural Center |
| September 20, 2023 | Shanghai | China | Shanghai Oriental Sports Center |

== Release history ==
Release history and formats for All 4 Nothing
| Region | Date | Format | Label | Ref. |
|---|---|---|---|---|
| Various | August 5, 2022 | Cassette; CD; Digital download; streaming; vinyl | A5B | |
