= Sophie Cates =

American singer-songwriter

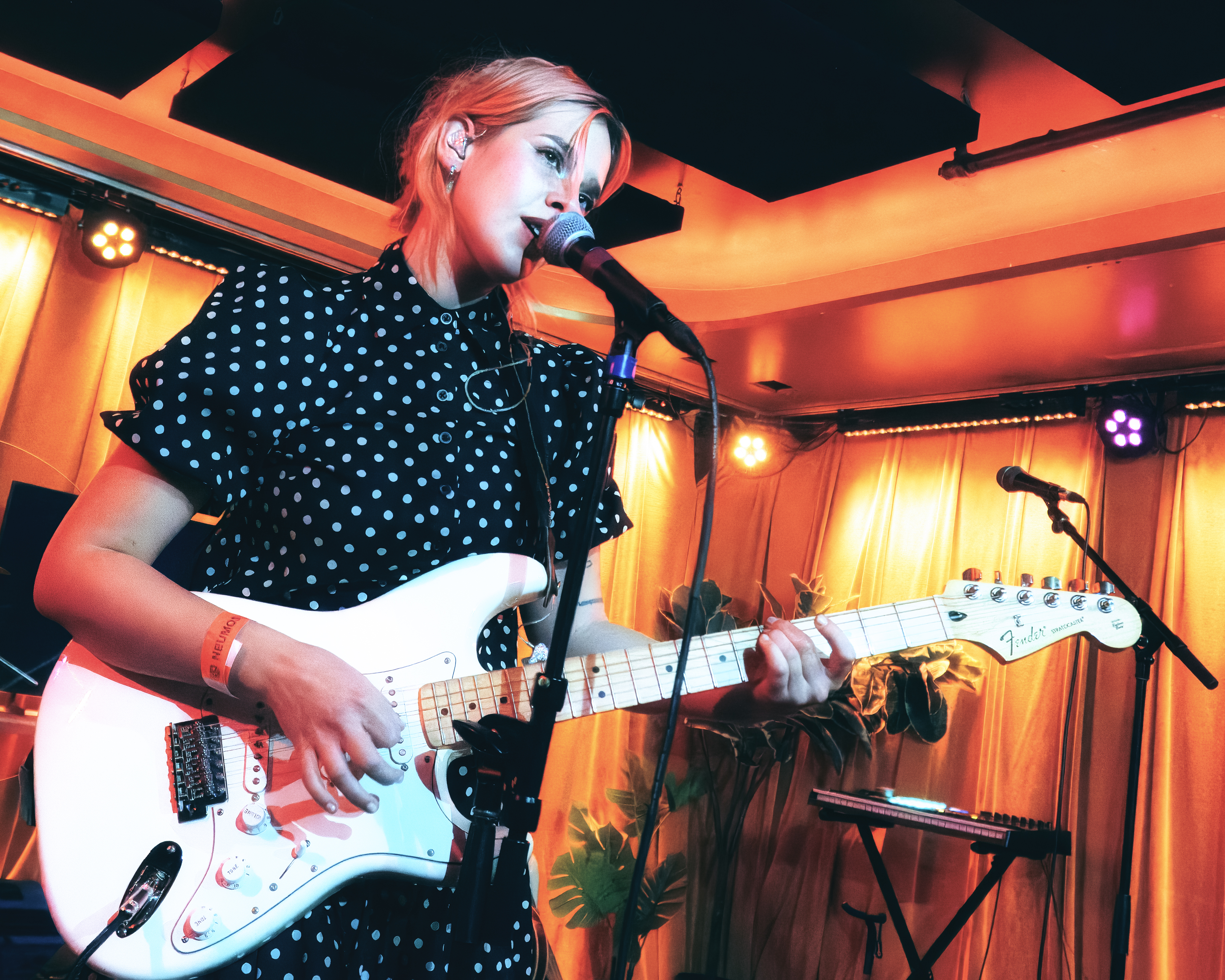
- Cates in 2024
- Born: August 25, 1999 (age 27); Los Angeles, California, U.S.
- Education: Columbia College
- Occupation: Singer-songwriter
- Musical career
- Also known as: Silver Sphere
- Genres: Pop; synthpop; electronic pop; pop rock
- Instrument: Vocals
- Years active: 2018–present
- Label: RCA

Sophie Marcella Cates (born August 25, 1999), formerly known as Silver Sphere, is an American singer-songwriter. She independently released her debut album Yikes! in October 2019, and was subsequently signed to RCA Records. In September 2020, she released her first EP, All My Boyfriends, through RCA. She released her second EP, Basement Party, in November 2022. In March 2024, she released her second studio album, SUPERNOVA.

== Career ==
In 2018, Cates independently released her debut single, "Drinking Games", using the stage name Silver Sphere. She wrote and produced the song herself at the age of 18 while studying at Columbia College. This was followed by other singles including "Boys In Bands" and "Sucks 4 U". On October 2, 2019, she independently released her debut album, Yikes!. Abby Wright of The Central Trend described the album as "a vibrant treasure map of pockets" and stated that she "really, really liked" the project.

The release of Yikes! led to Cates being signed by RCA Records, and on July 22, 2020, she released her debut major label single, "Crowd". On the day of its release, she announced that her second extended play, All My Boyfriends, would be released on September 23, 2020. Prior to the EP's release, she released "Handle Me" as a single on August 12, 2020. After the EP's release, Sienna Estrada of Earmilk praised Cates for demonstrating artistic growth, noting the contrast in sound between Yikes! and All My Boyfriends, noting her "bright pop melodies and attitude". On November 25, 2020, she released the single "Football Game". In July 2021, Cates announced via social media that she would be using her birth name as her professional artist name. In 2022 she self-released "Nasty" and "Cardigan" as singles from extended play Basement Party. She released the extended play in April 2022.

On March 29, 2024, Cates released SUPERNOVA, her second studio album. The album is thematically focused around her breakup with fellow singer-songwriter Lauv. The album's genres have been described as electronic pop and indie sleaze.

On August 16, 2024, Cates released the single rotation. The video for the single was directed and edited by Cates' longtime friend, Maximilian Kelly. In October 2026, Cates joined the Pixie Tour in support of Olivia O'Brien.

== Personal life ==
In 2020, she entered into a relationship with fellow singer-songwriter Lauv.

Cates is a cousin of fellow singer-songwriter Greta Kline, better known by her former solo stage name and current band name Frankie Cosmos. Cates has shared that her cousin Kline inspired her to start creating music as a teenager by introducing her to self-uploading on Bandcamp and inviting Cates to attend some of her live performances.

== Discography ==
=== Albums ===
Title	Details
Yikes!	Released: October 2, 2019; Label: Independent; Format: Digital download, streaming
SUPERNOVA	Released: March 29, 2024; Label: Independent; Format: Digital download, streaming

=== Extended plays ===
Title	Details
All My Boyfriends	Released: September 23, 2020; Label: RCA; Format: Digital download, streaming
Basement Party	Released: November 11, 2022; Label: Independent; Format: Digital download, streaming

=== Singles ===
==== As lead artist ====
Title	Year	Album
"Drinking Games"	2018	Yikes!
"Take it Away"	2018	Non-album single
"Boys in Bands"	2019	Yikes!
"Lost Cause"	2019	Yikes!
"Sucks 4 U"	2019	Yikes!
"Waste My Time"	2019	Yikes!
"Crowd"	2020	All My Boyfriends
"Handle Me"	2020	All My Boyfriends
"Football Game"	2020	Non-album single
"Bad Mood" (with Natasha Hunt Lee)	2022	The End Of The World!
"Nasty"	2022	Basement Party
"Cardigan"	2022	Basement Party
"Walking the Dogs"	2023	Supernova
"Supernova"	2023	Supernova
"Certain Light"	2023	Supernova
"I Don't See You (How I Used To)"	2023	Supernova
"Like That"	2024	Supernova
"17chains"	2024	Supernova
"Rotation"	2024	Non-album single
"Chaos Exposure"	2026	TBA
"Best You Ever Had"	2026	TBA

==== As featured artist ====
Title	Year	Album
"speaker" (umru with Ravenna Golden, Sophie Cates)	2022	comfort noise
"i don't reply" (Internet Girl, Sophie Cates)	2023	parasocial interaction (EP)
"lovesong" (Me As A Girl, Sophie Cates)	2023	it's all possible (EP)

=== Music videos ===
Title	Year	Director(s)
"Drinking Games"	2018	Malcolm Ryshavy
"Take it Away"	2018	Brit Wigintton
"Boys in Bands"	2019	Maya Cruz
"Lost Cause"	2019	Maya Cruz, Malcolm Ryshavy
"Sucks 4 U"	2019	Maya Cruz
"Boys Are Dumb! Duh!"	2019	Christian Vazquez
"I'll Go Goth"	2019	Drake Li
"Handle Me"	2020	Tusk
"Ghosts!"	2020	Tusk
"Football Game"	2020	Tusk
"Bad Mood" (with Natasha Hunt Lee)	2022	Hunter Moreno
"Nasty"	2022	Kevin Chen, Callum Hutchinson
"Cardigan"	2022	N/A
"Walking the Dogs"	2023	Paige MacCready
"Maybe She Was the One"	2023	Antony Muse
"I Don't See You (How I Used To)"	2023	Evan Deng
"Rotation"	2024	Maximilian Kelly

=== Songwriting credits ===
List of songs produced or co-produced for other artists, showing year released and album name
Title	Year	Artist(s)	Album
"Rushing Back"	2019	Flume, Vera Blue	Non-album single
"26"	2022	Lauv	All 4 Nothing
"All 4 Nothing (I'm So In Love)"	2022	Lauv	All 4 Nothing
"Shotgun"	2026	Jeremy Zucker	Archive_001
"I Don't Know Why I Said That"	2026	Me As A Girl	Non-album single

== Tours ==
=== Supporting ===
- Jeremy Zucker: MORE NOISE!!!! Tour (2022)
