= I Met You When I Was 18 (The Playlist) =

Compilation album by Lauv
- Released: May 31, 2018
- Genres: Pop; electronic; electropop
- Length: 61:01
- Label: AWAL
- Producers: Lauv; BloodPop; DallasK; Elof Loelv; FRND

Lauv chronology
Lauv EP (2017)	I Met You When I Was 18 (The Playlist) (2018)	How I'm Feeling (2020)

Singles from I Met You When I Was 18 (The Playlist)
- 1. "The Other" Released: March 12, 2015; 2. "Reforget" Released: July 15, 2015; 3. "Question" Released: June 10, 2016; 4. "Breathe" Released: October 6, 2016; 5. "The Story Never Ends" Released: October 20, 2016; 6. "I Like Me Better" Released: May 19, 2017; 7. "Easy Love" Released: October 5, 2017; 8. "Paris in the Rain" Released: November 16, 2017; 9. "Getting Over You" Released: February 14, 2018; 10. "Chasing Fire" Released: March 29, 2018

I Met You When I Was 18 (The Playlist) (stylized as I met you when I was 18. (the playlist)) is the debut compilation album by American singer-songwriter Lauv. It was released on May 31, 2018 by AWAL. The singer describes the album as a "playlist".

The album debuted at number 50 on the US Billboard 200 with 11,000 album equivalent units.

== Track listing ==
No.	Title	Writer(s)	Producer(s)	Length
1.	"I Like Me Better"	Ari Leff; Michael Matosic	Lauv	3:17
2.	"Paris In the Rain"	Leff; Matosic; Michael Pollack	Lauv	3:25
3.	"Comfortable"	Leff	Lauv	2:45
4.	"Paranoid"	Leff; Jesse St. John Geller; Pollack	Lauv	3:13
5.	"The Other"	Leff; Matosic	Lauv	3:09
6.	"Reforget"	Leff; Matosic	Lauv	3:52
7.	"The Story Never Ends"	Leff; Pollack; Matosic; Carlos Cid	Lauv	3:49
8.	"Enemies"	Leff; Pollack; Alexander O’Neill	Lauv; Elof Loelv; BloodPop	3:15
9.	"Come Back Home"	Leff	Lauv	3:52
10.	"Question" (featuring Travis Mills)	Leff; Travis Tatum Mills	Lauv	3:55
11.	"Easy Love"	Leff; Geller	Lauv	3:44
12.	"Adrenaline"	Leff	Lauv	3:26
13.	"Chasing Fire"	Leff; Pollack; James Sunderland; Brett Hite	Lauv	3:25
14.	"Breathe"	Leff; Matosic; Dallas Koehlke	Lauv; DallasK	3:58
15.	"Bracelet"	Leff; Pollack; Andrew Goldstein	Lauv; FRND	4:22
16.	"Getting Over You"	Leff; Matosic; Tinashe Sibanda	Lauv	4:16
17.	"Never Not"	Leff; Pollack	Lauv; Pollack	3:28
Total length:				61:01

== Charts ==
Chart performance for I Met You When I Was 18 (The Playlist)
Chart (2018)	Peak position
Belgian Albums (Ultratop Flanders)	77
Canadian Albums (Billboard)	40
Dutch Albums (Album Top 100)	105
US Billboard 200	50
US Independent Albums (Billboard)	30

== Certifications ==
Certifications for I Met You When I Was 18 (The Playlist)
Region	Certification	Certified units/sales
Denmark (IFPI Danmark)	Gold	10,000^{‡}
United Kingdom (BPI)	Silver	60,000^{‡}
United States (RIAA)	Gold	500,000^{‡}
^{‡} Sales+streaming figures based on certification alone.
