= Miquela =

Virtual influencer and singer

- Occupations: Influencer; singer; musician; model
- Years active: 2016–present

Instagram information
- Page: lilmiquela
- Followers: 2.3 million
- Musical career
- Genres: Pop; electropop; R&B
- Instruments: Speech synthesis
- Label: Brud

Miquela Sousa, also called Lil Miquela, or known mononymously by the stage name Miquela, is a virtual singer and social media personality. She was created by Trevor McFedries and Sara DeCou as a 19-year-old girl, often described as a "robot" of Brazilian-American heritage. The character began in 2016 as an Instagram profile that details a fictional narrative which presents Miquela as a CGI character and model in conflict with other digital projects while marketing a variety of brands, primarily in fashion.

Miquela has been featured in product endorsements for streetwear and luxury brands such as Calvin Klein and Prada. Her account gained more than a million followers within its first two years. Miquela released her debut single "Not Mine" in 2017, followed by a series of singles.

== Origins and career ==
The fictional character is a teenage Instagram model from Downey, California. Her first Instagram post was made on April 23, 2016. British model Emily Bador was rumored to be Miquela; Bador has denied managing the account but openly acknowledged the physical similarity between herself and the character. In April 2018, a second, similar character known as Bermuda "hacked" into the Miquela account, deleted all photos of Miquela and replaced them with photos of the Bermuda character. Miquela and Bermuda were then revealed to both be characters created by Brud, a Los Angeles-based startup led by McFedries and Decou.

Miquela has been pictured with a number of celebrities including Diplo, Molly Soda, Millie Bobby Brown, Nile Rodgers, Samantha Urbani, 50 Cent, Tracee Ellis Ross and Pabllo Vittar. She has been interviewed in a number of publications including Refinery29, Vogue, BuzzFeed, Nylon, The Guardian, Business of Fashion, and The Cut. She appeared on the cover of Highsnobiety in April 2018. She has also been featured in the magazines Paper and V. During 2019 Coachella, Miquela interviewed Colombian singer J Balvin, and took a picture with Spanish singer Rosalía.

Miquela is also a musician and has been compared to Gorillaz and Hatsune Miku. In August 2017, Miquela released her debut single, "Not Mine". It was shortly followed by the promotional singles "Over You" and "On My Own" in September and October respectively. In January 2018, she released her second single "You Should Be Alone". In August, she collaborated with American producer Baauer on the electropop single "Hate Me", which was a departure from her previous R&B releases. It served as Miquela's first appearance in a music video.

In April 2019, Miquela released "Right Back", which received an EP of remixes entitled Right Back (Club 404 Edits), released in June. On July 31, she released two singles, "Money" and "Sleeping In". The music video for "Money" was directed by Charlotte Rutherford. In October, she released "Wasted" and was featured on the remix of Lauv's song "Sims", from his debut album How I'm Feeling. The following month, Miquela released "Automatic".

In 2020, Miquela "consciously uncoupled" from her "human" boyfriend as a part of the storyline.

In 2025, Miquela launched a campaign in partnership with the National Marrow Donor Program (NMDP), formerly known as Be The Match. The campaign presents a first-person narrative depicting a leukemia diagnosis, the search for a donor, and treatment, drawing on real patient experiences to raise awareness for bone marrow donation.

== Fashion collaborations ==
In February 2018, the character did an Instagram takeover for Prada as part of Milan Fashion Week. On May 16, she did a Calvin Klein ad with Bella Hadid, in which both were animated, in addition to a collaboration with Samsung. That year, Miquela was hired as a contributing arts editor to the magazine Dazed. In 2020, Miquela became the first digital avatar to sign with a talent agency when a contract was signed with CAA—becoming its first virtual client. It was discovered at the time that Miquela had previously been represented by WME.

== Controversies ==
In May 2019, Miquela and Bella Hadid received backlash for kissing in a Calvin Klein commercial, being accused of using their sexuality to artificially increase their views. In December 2019, the fictional character described "her" sexual assault on YouTube. American singer Kehlani called out Miquela on Twitter for being "ignorantly offensive". This aspect of her backstory positioned the Miquela character as a social justice activist, which generated criticism given her use as a marketing tool.

== Impact ==
In June 2018, Miquela was named one of Time’s 25 Most Influential People on the Internet along with fellow fashion peers DietPrada (duo composed of Lindsey Schuyler and Tony Liu) and celebrated musicians Rihanna and BTS.

== Discography ==
=== Singles ===
Title	Year
"Not Mine"	2017
"You Should Be Alone"	2018
"Hate Me" (with Baauer)	2018
"Right Back"	2019
"Money" / "Sleeping In"	2019
"Wasted"	2019
"Automatic"	2019
"Speak Up"	2020
"Machine" (featuring Teyana Taylor)	2020
"Hard Feelings"	2020
"Masterpiece"	2022
"Prototype" (featuring John Liwag)	2026

=== Promotional singles ===
Title	Year
"Over You"	2017
"On My Own"	2017
"#MiquelaCovers"	2020

=== Guest appearances ===
Title	Artist	Year	Album
"Sims (Miquela Remix)"	Lauv	2019	How I'm Feeling (The Extras)
