= Without You (EP) =

2020 EP by Lauv

EP by Lauv
- Released: June 24, 2020
- Length: 12:45
- Label: AWAL
- Producer: Lauv; Johnny Simpson; DallasK

Lauv chronology
How I'm Feeling (2020)	Without You (2020)	All 4 Nothing (2022)

Singles from Without You
- 1. "Dishes" Released: June 24, 2020

Without You is the fourth extended play (EP) by American singer Lauv. It was released on June 24, 2020 by AWAL.

== Background ==
The EP contains five tracks. They were all written and produced during quarantine. A music video for the only single, "Dishes", was also released. The music video shows Lauv in his kitchen with dishes around him. He then sings how great it was when he had his significant other. A line from the song gave the EP the name, Without You.

== Track listing ==
Without You track listing
No.	Title	Writer(s)	Producer(s)	Length
1.	"Dishes"	Ari Leff; Dallas Koehlke	Lauv; DallasK	2:36
2.	"Mine (You Can't Find Love in Mollywood)"	Leff; Koehlke; Andrea Rosario; Jonathan Simpson; William Thomas Walsh	Lauv; DallasK; Johnny Simpson	3:26
3.	"Miss Me" (demo)	Leff; Rosario; Jay Grice	Lauv; Simpson	1:58
4.	"Love Somebody"	Leff; Simpson; Amy Allen	Lauv; DallasK; Simpson	2:22
5.	"Dishes" (acoustic)	Leff; Koehlke	Lauv; DallasK	2:21
Total length:				12:45
