= A Different Way =

Single by DJ Snake featuring Lauv
- Released: 21 September 2017
- Genre: EDM; pop
- Length: 3:18
- Label: Geffen
- Songwriters: Lindy Robbins; Ilsey Juber; Ed Sheeran; Johnny McDaid; William Grigahcine; Ryan Tedder; Steve Mac
- Producer: DJ Snake

DJ Snake singles chronology
"Good Day" (2017)	"A Different Way" (2017)	"Broken Summer" (2017)

Lauv singles chronology
"I Like Me Better" (2017)	"A Different Way" (2017)	"Easy Love" (2017)

"A Different Way" is a song by French DJ and record producer DJ Snake, featuring vocals from American singer Lauv. It was written by Snake, Lindy Robbins, Ilsey Juber, Ed Sheeran, Johnny McDaid and Steve Mac, with production handled by Snake. It was released to digital retailers through Geffen Records on 21 September 2017, a day earlier than its expected release date.

== Background ==
Snake debuted the song during a Facebook Live video stream on 6 September 2017. He also performed other songs such as "Turn Down for What", "Here Comes the Night" from his 2016 album Encore, and a remix of his Justin Bieber collaboration "Let Me Love You" in the 23-minute mix. It took place on top of Arc de Triomphe, one of the most famous monuments in Paris, Snake's hometown. He announced on social media the previous day that he will be live streaming from an undisclosed location in Paris, with the accompanying hashtag "#ADifferentWay". The stream was directed by Grammy-nominated American director Colin Tilley. Snake later announced the single's release date on Twitter. On 21 September 2017, Snake premiered the song on Zane Lowe's Beats 1 Radio show.

== Critical reception ==
"A Different Way" was well received from music critics. David Rishty of Billboard wrote that the song features "a bouncy melody and punchy backbeat", and that it "carries a similar style to that of 'Let Me Love You'". Jeffrey Yau of Your EDM deemed the song "a mid-tempo ballad that features a furious, futuristic drop which should be radio friendly enough to be a smash while still retaining the energy and atmosphere in a classic Snake main stage banger". Rajrishi Murthi of Bangin Beats felt "the infectious vocal-driven track boasts of all the ingredients to take over airwaves in the coming days". Mike Wass of Idolator opined that the song "doesn't reinvent the wheel", but regarded it as "a no-brainer for pop radio and manages to inject a little emotion into the increasingly soulless club banger".

== Charts ==
=== Weekly charts ===
Chart (2017)	Peak position
Australia (ARIA)	59
Belgium (Ultratip Bubbling Under Flanders)	1
Belgium (Ultratop 50 Wallonia)	20
Canada Hot 100 (Billboard)	78
Colombia (National-Report)	60
Czech Republic Singles Digital (ČNS IFPI)	57
France (SNEP)	57
Ireland (IRMA)	72
Latvia (DigiTop100)	56
Netherlands (Dutch Top 40)	25
Netherlands (Single Top 100)	46
New Zealand Heatseekers (RMNZ)	1
Philippines (Philippine Hot 100)	85
Portugal (AFP)	42
Slovakia Singles Digital (ČNS IFPI)	49
Sweden (Sverigetopplistan)	65
Switzerland (Schweizer Hitparade)	63
UK Singles (Official Charts)	85
US Bubbling Under Hot 100 (Billboard)	23
US Hot Dance/Electronic Songs (Billboard)	11
Venezuela (National-Report)	46

=== Year-end charts ===
Chart (2017)	Position
US Hot Dance/Electronic Songs (Billboard)	65
Chart (2018)	Position
France (SNEP)	178
Romania (Airplay 100)	74
US Hot Dance/Electronic Songs (Billboard)	46

== Certifications ==
Region	Certification	Certified units/sales
Australia (ARIA)	Platinum	70,000^{‡}
Brazil (Pro-Música Brasil)	Platinum	60,000^{‡}
Canada (Music Canada)	Platinum	80,000^{‡}
France (SNEP)	Platinum	200,000^{‡}
Italy (FIMI)	Gold	25,000^{‡}
New Zealand (RMNZ)	Gold	15,000^{‡}
Portugal (AFP)	Gold	5,000^{‡}
United States (RIAA)	Gold	500,000^{‡}
^{‡} Sales+streaming figures based on certification alone.

== Release history ==
Region	Date	Format	Label	Ref.
United States	21 September 2017	Digital download	Geffen	
United Kingdom	23 September 2017	Contemporary hit radio	Geffen	
United States	3 October 2017	Contemporary hit radio	Geffen	
