= Easy Love (Lauv song) =

Single by Lauv

from the album I Met You When I Was 18 (The Playlist)
- Released: October 6, 2017
- Genre: Pop
- Length: 3:44
- Label: AWAL
- Songwriter(s): Ari Leff; Jesse St. John

Lauv singles chronology
"A Different Way" (2017)	"Easy Love" (2017)	"Paris in the Rain" (2017)

Music video
- "Easy Love" on YouTube

"Easy Love" is a single released by American singer Lauv. It was released on October 6, 2017 and is included on Lauv's compilation album I Met You When I Was 18 (The Playlist), released on May 31, 2018.

== Background, composition and critical reception ==
The song was written by Lauv himself along songwriter Jesse St. John. About the meaning of the song and the development of its meaning on the music video, Lauv commented in an interview with Bravo: "This song is about surrendering and embracing a light on imperfections, struggles, and madness in a relationship... reality is going to break through walls and not always to reveal so brilliant reality - that is exactly what we have done in the music video." Mike Wass from Idolator gave a positive review, calling the song "a wavy bop about the temporary insanity otherwise known as love."

== Charts ==
Chart (2017)	Peak position
New Zealand Heatseekers (RMNZ)	5
Swedish Heatseekers (Sverigetopplistan)	12
