= Drugs & the Internet =

Single by Lauv

from the album How I'm Feeling
- Released: April 25, 2019
- Genre: Pop
- Length: 2:58
- Label: AWAL
- Songwriters: Ari Leff; Jonathan Bellion; Michael Matosic; Michael Pollack
- Producers: Jon Bellion; Johnny Simpson; Lauv

Lauv singles chronology
"I'm So Tired..." (2019)	"Drugs & the Internet" (2019)	"Sad Forever" (2019)

Music video
- "Drugs & the Internet" on YouTube

"Drugs & the Internet" is a song by American singer and songwriter Lauv, released as a single on April 25, 2019. It was the second single for his debut studio album, How I'm Feeling (2020). The song was Lauv's first single since his January 2019 collaboration with Troye Sivan, "I'm So Tired...".

== Background and composition ==
Speaking of the song, Lauv stated:

I wrote it as a sort of self-analysis for my obsession with the way I wanted present myself to the world. It is as much self-deprecating as it is serious and sad [The song] flew out of me in an hour. It felt more therapeutic than [anything] I’d written before". As the first song off of my album ~how i’m feeling~, it is the perfect entrance into the next phase of my life and music.

— Lauv

Lauv wrote the song while he was feeling emptiness and depression. It begins as a piano ballad before breaking into a bass-heavy beat. The song's lyrics discuss self-perception and identity.

== Music video ==
The music video was directed by Jenna Marsh. The video features the singer getting sucked into social media, and it has been compared to the British science fiction anthology television series Black Mirror. It was produced by Operator Media and Meaning production.

== Track listing ==
Digital download
No.	Title	Length
1.	"Drugs & the Internet"	2:58

CHVRCHES Remix
No.	Title	Length
1.	"Drugs & the Internet" (CHVRCHES Remix)	3:53

"Stripped – A One Take Vibe"
No.	Title	Length
1.	"Drugs & the Internet" (Stripped – A One Take Vibe)	3:10

== Charts ==
Chart (2019)	Peak position
Ireland (IRMA)	57
Lithuania (AGATA)	42
New Zealand Hot Singles (RMNZ)	11
Swedish Heatseeker (Sverigetopplistan)	18
UK Indie (OCC)	17
