= Fuck, I'm Lonely =

2019 single by Lauv featuring Anne-Marie

Single by Lauv featuring Anne-Marie

from the album How I'm Feeling and the soundtrack of 13 Reasons Why: Season 3
- Released: August 1, 2019
- Genre: Pop
- Length: 3:18
- Label: AWAL
- Songwriters: Ari Leff; Michael Matosic; Michael Pollack
- Producer: Lauv

Lauv singles chronology
"Sad Forever" (2019)	"Fuck, I'm Lonely" (2019)	"Feelings" (2019)

Anne-Marie singles chronology
"Rewrite the Stars" (2018)	"Fuck, I'm Lonely" (2019)	"Birthday" (2020)

"Fuck, I'm Lonely" (also released in a censored version as "Lonely", both titles stylized in lowercase) is a song by American singer Lauv featuring English singer Anne-Marie. It was released as a single on August 1, 2019, alongside the trailer for the third season of the Netflix series 13 Reasons Why, whose soundtrack features the song. It is also included on Lauv's debut album, How I'm Feeling.

== Background ==
Lauv met Anne-Marie after they both performed at the Summertime Ball at Wembley Stadium, London, and called the lyrics "pretty self-explanatory" as well as about "missing someone you used to hook up with" and his "least deep and mysterious song". He made the beat on his laptop in an hour while at an airport, and said the title of the song "came out of nowhere" in a conversation with his friends. Anne-Marie said "I never really like admitting that I miss someone after a break up. So here's a song that does it for me."

== Music video ==
The music video, released on August 21, 2019, features both singers among other people at an apartment thinking about what to do for the night. They meet whilst shopping in a supermarket.

== Critical reception ==
Clash called the song "brutally honest but ultra-infectious" and elaborated that Lauv has "the ability to make the bleakest emotions seem beautiful" as well as a "consistent dichotomy running through his work". i-D felt that the track is "both dangerously catchy and sort of sad when you think about it", describing it a song that "forces you to have a 4am, Sunday morning epiphany as you melt into the sofa at an afterparty". MTV wrote the song is "Sonically and thematically, [...] right in line with Lauv's other recent singles [...] Over a quirky combination of synths, he and Anne-Marie ruminate on their exes and wallow in their loneliness".

== Charts ==
=== Weekly charts ===
Chart (2019)	Peak position
Australia (ARIA)	19
Austria (Ö3 Austria Top 40)	48
Belgium (Ultratop 50 Flanders)	21
Belgium (Ultratip Bubbling Under Wallonia)	26
Canada Hot 100 (Billboard)	70
Czech Republic Singles Digital (ČNS IFPI)	40
Estonia (Eesti Ekspress)	31
Germany (GfK)	80
Hungary (Stream Top 40)	33
Ireland (IRMA)	15
Latvia (LaIPA)	23
Lithuania (AGATA)	16
Malaysia (RIM)	16
New Zealand (Recorded Music NZ)	20
Norway (VG-lista)	36
Scotland Singles (OCC)	27
Singapore (RIAS)	9
Slovakia Airplay (ČNS IFPI)	85
Slovakia Singles Digital (ČNS IFPI)	24
South Korea (Gaon)	92
Sweden (Sverigetopplistan)	49
Switzerland (Schweizer Hitparade)	53
UK Singles (OCC)	32
US Bubbling Under Hot 100 (Billboard)	8
US Pop Airplay (Billboard)	33
US Rolling Stone Top 100	98

=== Year-end charts ===
Chart (2019)	Position
Belgium (Ultratop Flanders)	91

== Certifications ==
Region	Certification	Certified units/sales
Australia (ARIA)	2× Platinum	140,000^{‡}
New Zealand (RMNZ)	Platinum	30,000^{‡}
United Kingdom (BPI)	Gold	400,000^{‡}
United States (RIAA)	Gold	500,000^{‡}
^{‡} Sales+streaming figures based on certification alone.
