= How I'm Feeling =

Studio album by Lauv
- Released: March 6, 2020
- Genre: Pop
- Length: 66:21
- Language: English; Spanish
- Label: AWAL
- Producer: Lauv; Johnny Simpson; The Monsters and the Strangerz; DallasK; Jon Bellion; LANY; Mike Crossey; OzGo; Johan Carlsson; Halatrax; Mike Elizondo

Lauv chronology
I Met You When I Was 18 (The Playlist) (2018)	How I'm Feeling (2020)	Without You (2020)

Singles from How I'm Feeling
- 1. "I'm So Tired..." Released: January 24, 2019; 2. "Drugs & the Internet" Released: April 25, 2019; 3. "Sad Forever" Released: May 31, 2019; 4. "Fuck, I'm Lonely" Released: August 2, 2019; 5. "Feelings" Released: September 19, 2019; 6. "Sims" Released: October 3, 2019; 7. "Mean It" Released: November 14, 2019; 8. "Changes" Released: January 2, 2020; 9. "Tattoos Together" Released: January 16, 2020; 10. "Modern Loneliness" Released: February 20, 2020; 11. "El Tejano" Released: May 19, 2020

How I'm Feeling (stylized as ~how i'm feeling~) is the debut studio album by American singer-songwriter Lauv. It was released on March 6, 2020, by AWAL. The album was supported by eleven singles, with three featuring artists such as Australian singer Troye Sivan, English singer Anne Marie, and American pop band LANY, with the single with Sivan peaking at number eighty one on the Billboard Hot 100. Upon release, new tracks featured collaborations with Canadian singer Alessia Cara, Mexican singer Sofía Reyes and South Korean boy band BTS. How I'm Feeling received mixed to positive reviews from music critics.

Commercially, the album debuted at number sixteen on the Billboard 200 in the US, number nine on the UK Albums Chart in the UK and number eleven on the Canadian Albums Chart in Canada. In October 2021, the album was certified gold by the Recording Industry Association of America (RIAA) for combined sales, streaming and track-sales equivalent of five hundred thousand units.

== Cover art ==
The cover depicts miniature versions of Lauv standing and sitting on him wearing colorful outfits. According to Lauv, these characters are "represented by purple (existential Lauv), blue (hopeless romantic Lauv), green (goofy Lauv), yellow (positive Lauv), orange (fuckboy Lauv) and red (spicy Lauv), all of which make up [his] identity." The music video for "Sims" would "bring the album concept and characters to life for the first time", and allowed viewers to get a glimpse inside Lauv's mind and learn about the concept behind the album.

== Singles ==
The lead single from the album, called "I'm So Tired..." with Troye Sivan was released on January 24, 2019. The music video was released on February 14, 2019. The song peaked at number 81 on the Billboard Hot 100.

== Commercial performance ==
How I'm Feeling debuted at number sixteen on the Billboard 200. On October 18, 2021, the album was certified gold by the Recording Industry Association of America (RIAA) for combined sales, streaming and track-sales equivalent of five hundred thousand units.

== Critical reception ==
Professional ratings
Aggregate scores
Source	Rating
AnyDecentMusic?	7.1/10
Metacritic	67/100
Review scores
Source	Rating
DIY	4.5/5 stars
Exclaim!	9/10
The Line of Best Fit	8.5/10
NME	3/5 stars
Pitchfork	5.1/10

How I'm Feeling received mixed to positive reviews from music critics. At Metacritic, which assigns a normalized rating out of 100 to reviews from mainstream publications, the album received an average score of 67, based on six reviews, indicating "generally favorable reviews".

== Track listing ==
How I'm Feeling
No.	Title	Writer(s)	Producer(s)	Length
1.	"Drugs & the Internet"	Ari Leff; Michael Pollack; Michael Matosic; Jonathan Bellion; Jonathan Simpson	Lauv; Jon Bellion; Simpson	2:58
2.	"Fuck, I'm Lonely" (with Anne-Marie)	Leff; Pollack; Matosic	Lauv	3:18
3.	"Lonely Eyes"	Leff; Pollack; Matosic; Nick Long; Stefan Johnson; Jordan K. Johnson; Marcus Lomax	Lauv; The Monsters & Strangerz	3:16
4.	"Sims"	Leff; Pollack; Matosic; Brandon Lowry; Simpson	Lauv; Simpson	2:35
5.	"Believed"	Leff; Pollack; Matosic; Simpson	Lauv; Simpson	2:49
6.	"Billy"	Leff; S. Johnson; J. Johnson	Lauv; Simpson; The Monsters & Strangerz	3:00
7.	"Feelings"	Leff; Pollack; Andrea Rosario; Simpson	Lauv; Simpson	3:09
8.	"Canada" (featuring Alessia Cara)	Leff; Alessia Caracciolo; Marshall Kenneth Vore; Phoebe Bridgers; Simpson	Lauv; Simpson; Babygirl; Father Moth	3:04
9.	"For Now"	Leff; Pollack; Matosic; Anthony Rossomando	Lauv	3:09
10.	"Mean It" (with LANY)	Leff; Pollack; Matosic; Paul Klein; John Hill; Jordan Palmer	Lauv; LANY; Mike Crossey	3:52
11.	"Tell My Mama"	Leff; Caroline Furoyen; S. Johnson; J. Johnson; Lomax	Lauv; The Monsters & Strangerz	2:46
12.	"Sweatpants"	Leff; Simpson	Lauv; Simpson	3:16
13.	"Who" (featuring BTS)	Leff; Zaylee Kelman; Daniel Seavey; Corbyn Besson; Jonah Marais; Dallas Koehlke	Lauv; DallasK	3:00
14.	"I'm So Tired..." (with Troye Sivan)	Leff; Pollack; Troye Sivan Mellet; Brett McLaughlin; Oscar Görres	Lauv; Görres	2:42
15.	"El Tejano" (featuring Sofia Reyes)	Leff; Pollack; Charlie Guerrero; Shari Shorte; Sofia Reyes; Ross Golan; Johan Carlsson	Lauv; Carlsson	3:11
16.	"Tattoos Together"	Leff; Pollack; Jacob Kasher Hindlin; Ammar Malik	Lauv	3:06
17.	"Changes"	Leff; Pollack; Matosic	Lauv	2:40
18.	"Sad Forever"	Leff; Pollack; Jacob Torrey; Koehlke	Lauv; DallasK; Halatrax	3:23
19.	"Invisible Things"	Leff; Pollack; S. Johnson; J. Johnson	Lauv; Simpson; The Monsters & Strangerz	3:17
20.	"Julia"	Leff; Pollack; S. Johnson; J. Johnson; Lomax	Lauv	3:38
21.	"Modern Loneliness"	Leff; Pollack; Matosic; Simpson; Mike Elizondo	Lauv; Simpson; Elizondo	4:12
Total length:				66:21

Japanese edition (bonus track)
No.	Title	Writer(s)	Producer(s)	Length
22.	"I'm So Tired..." (Stripped Live in LA)	Leff; Pollack; Mellet; McLaughlin; Görres	Lauv; Görres	3:11
Total length:				69:32

How I'm Feeling (The Extras)
No.	Title	Length
1.	"Love Like That"	3:04
2.	"Modern Loneliness" (acoustic)	4:12
3.	"Drugs & the Internet" (stripped – a one-take vibe)	3:10
4.	"Drugs & the Internet" (Chvrches Remix)	3:53
5.	"Lonely" (featuring Anne-Marie)	3:18
6.	"Fuck, I'm Lonely" (featuring Anne-Marie) (stripped)	3:07
7.	"Fuck, I'm Lonely" (featuring Anne-Marie) (Ofenbach Remix)	2:58
8.	"Sims" (Miquela Remix)	2:37
9.	"Mean It" (with LANY) (stripped)	4:01
10.	"I'm So Tired..." (Stripped – Live in LA)	3:07
11.	"I'm So Tired..." (MNEK Remix)	3:20
12.	"Modern Loneliness" (Lvndscape Remix)	3:14
13.	"Modern Loneliness" (Ghostt Remix)	3:17
14.	"Modern Loneliness" (Merk & Kremont Remix)	2:09
15.	"Modern Loneliness" (Ritviz Remix)	3:37
16.	"Modern Loneliness" (Vaundy Remix)	3:30
17.	"Modern Loneliness" (Zakes Bantwini Remix)	3:29
18.	"Modern Loneliness" (Diskover Remix)	3:44
19.	"Modern Loneliness" (Mygal Remix)	3:30
20.	"Modern Loneliness" (Sihan Remix)	3:11
Total length:		66:28

Notes

- "Fuck, I'm Lonely" and "I'm So Tired..." are stylized in all lowercase.
- "Who" only features Jimin and Jungkook of BTS, not the whole group.

== Charts ==
=== Weekly charts ===
Weekly chart performance for How I'm Feeling
Chart (2019–2020)	Peak position
Australian Albums (ARIA)	5
Austrian Albums (Ö3 Austria)	10
Belgian Albums (Ultratop Flanders)	8
Belgian Albums (Ultratop Wallonia)	75
Canadian Albums (Billboard)	11
Danish Albums (Hitlisten)	22
Dutch Albums (Album Top 100)	13
Estonian Albums (Eesti Tipp-40)	6
Finnish Albums (Suomen virallinen lista)	44
French Albums (SNEP)	83
German Albums (Offizielle Top 100)	27
Irish Albums (OCC)	11
Italian Albums (FIMI)	82
Latvian Albums (LAIPA)	5
Lithuanian Albums (AGATA)	4
New Zealand Albums (RMNZ)	6
Norwegian Albums (VG-lista)	29
Portuguese Albums (AFP)	31
Scottish Albums (OCC)	37
Spanish Albums (PROMUSICAE)	39
Swedish Albums (Sverigetopplistan)	58
Swiss Albums (Schweizer Hitparade)	21
UK Albums (OCC)	9
UK Independent Albums (OCC)	7
US Billboard 200	16
US Independent Albums (Billboard)	4

=== Year-end charts ===
2020 year-end chart performance for How I'm Feeling
Chart (2020)	Position
Australian Albums (ARIA)	64
Belgian Albums (Ultratop Flanders)	59
Danish Albums (Hitlisten)	97
Dutch Albums (Album Top 100)	96
New Zealand Albums (RMNZ)	42

== Certifications ==
Sales certifications for How I'm Feeling
Region	Certification	Certified units/sales
Canada (Music Canada)	Gold	40,000^{‡}
Denmark (IFPI Danmark)	Gold	10,000^{‡}
New Zealand (RMNZ)	Platinum	15,000^{‡}
United Kingdom (BPI)	Silver	60,000^{‡}
United States (RIAA)	Gold	500,000^{‡}
^{‡} Sales+streaming figures based on certification alone.
