= I Like Me Better =

2017 single by Lauv

Single by Lauv

from the album I Met You When I Was 18 (The Playlist)
- Released: May 19, 2017
- Recorded: 2016–2017
- Genre: Electropop
- Length: 3:17
- Label: AWAL
- Songwriters: Ari Leff; Michael Matosic
- Producer: Leff

Lauv singles chronology
"The Story Never Ends" (2016)	"I Like Me Better" (2017)	"A Different Way" (2017)

Music video
- "I Like Me Better" on YouTube

"I Like Me Better" is a song recorded and produced by American singer Lauv. It was released on May 19, 2017, and is included on his compilation album I Met You When I Was 18 (The Playlist), which was released on May 31, 2018. The song was written by Lauv and Michael Matosic. It has also been used in an Android Auto app commercial, in the trailer of Netflix's romantic comedy To All the Boys I've Loved Before, and in the fall ball episode of Netflix's comedy series The Expanding Universe of Ashley Garcia.

"I Like Me Better" reached the top ten in Australia, Austria and Germany, the top-twenty in New Zealand and Slovakia, and the top-forty in Belgium, the Czech Republic, Denmark, Hungary, Ireland, Norway, Sweden, and Switzerland. In his native United States, the song was a sleeper hit, spending over six months on the US Billboard Hot 100 before reaching number 27 in September 2018. It was also used as background music during the evening gown competition of Miss Universe 2018.

== Background and composition ==
The song was inspired by Lauv's move to New York City and falling in love shortly afterwards. After arriving at the studio with "no concept, no lyrics, no idea I was going to write that song," he chopped together a voice memo he left himself, intending to change the sound later (although he never did).

Musically, "I Like Me Better" is an electropop song that contains elements of Guitar pop, snap and Alt-pop, as well as vocal effects. According to the sheet music published at musicnotes.com, the song is written in the key of A major. The song's verses are resigned and have a quaint and simple sound, laden with a simple, jangly guitar loop, an Electric piano and a sparse, finger-click beat that transitions into drum beats in the chorus. Lauv's vocals span from the low note of B2 to the high note of C#5. It features a prominent sound effect that sounds similar to a synthesizer. The sound was Lauv's voice, which he recorded on his phone.

== Commercial performance ==
After spending a number of weeks on the Bubbling Under Hot 100 Singles chart, "I Like Me Better" made its official debut on the US Billboard Hot 100 at number 96 for the issue dated February 24, 2018. It has since reached number 27, becoming his first top-forty hit on the Hot 100. On the Mainstream Top 40 chart, "I Like Me Better" reached the top 10 after a historic 35-week climb, breaking the record for the longest time to reach the top 10 on the chart.

"I Like Me Better" proved to be a strong hit in parts of Europe and Oceania. In Australia, the song peaked at number eight on the ARIA Singles Chart, with it being certified triple Platinum by the Australian Recording Industry Association (ARIA) for exceeding 210,000 sales and streams. Similarly, the song peaked at number 13 on the New Zealand Singles Chart, and obtained a platinum certification there.

The song also reached success in Austria and Germany, where it peaked at numbers five and seven respectively. It ranked as the forty-second best selling song on the Official German Charts year-end list of 2017, selling 400,000 copies there.

== Music video ==
A music video of "I Like Me Better" features Lauv himself and Paige Spara as the younger self of the actors Richard Bergman and Michelle Star, respectively.

== Charts ==
=== Weekly charts ===
Chart (2017-2019)	Peak position
Australia (ARIA)	8
Austria (Ö3 Austria Top 40)	5
Belgium (Ultratop 50 Flanders)	30
Belgium (Ultratop 50 Wallonia)	48
Canada Hot 100 (Billboard)	62
Canada AC (Billboard)	1
Canada CHR/Top 40 (Billboard)	11
Canada Hot AC (Billboard)	2
Czech Republic Airplay (ČNS IFPI)	89
Czech Republic Singles Digital (ČNS IFPI)	31
Denmark (Tracklisten)	27
France (SNEP)	79
Germany (GfK)	7
Hungary (Single Top 40)	40
Hungary (Stream Top 40)	31
Ireland (IRMA)	33
Italy (FIMI)	92
Latvia (DigiTop100)	28
Malaysia (RIM)	18
Netherlands (Single Top 100)	57
New Zealand (Recorded Music NZ)	13
Norway (VG-lista)	24
Romania Airplay (Media Forest)	10
Scottish Singles Sales (Official Charts)	54
Slovakia Airplay (ČNS IFPI)	26
Slovakia Singles Digital (ČNS IFPI)	17
Sweden (Sverigetopplistan)	25
Switzerland (Schweizer Hitparade)	23
UK Singles (Official Charts)	58
US Billboard Hot 100	27
US Adult Contemporary (Billboard)	5
US Adult Pop Airplay (Billboard)	2
US Dance Club Songs (Billboard)	35
US Dance Airplay (Billboard)	13
US Pop Airplay (Billboard)	7

Chart (2024–2025)	Peak position
Global 200 (Billboard)	140
Malaysia International (RIM)	17
Philippines (Philippines Hot 100)	17

=== Year-end charts ===
Chart (2017)	Position
Australia (ARIA)	59
Austria (Ö3 Austria Top 40)	27
Denmark (Tracklisten)	82
Germany (Official German Charts)	42
Sweden (Sverigetopplistan)	92
Switzerland (Schweizer Hitparade)	96

Chart (2018)	Position
Australia (ARIA)	74
Estonia (IFPI)	72
Romania (Airplay 100)	29
Switzerland (Schweizer Hitparade)	95
US Billboard Hot 100	35
US Adult Contemporary (Billboard)	31
US Adult Top 40 (Billboard)	12
US Dance/Mix Show Airplay (Billboard)	50
US Mainstream Top 40 (Billboard)	22

Chart (2019)	Position
US Adult Contemporary (Billboard)	7
US Adult Top 40 (Billboard)	40

== Certifications ==
Region	Certification	Certified units/sales
Australia (ARIA)	7× Platinum	490,000^{‡}
Austria (IFPI Austria)	Platinum	30,000^{‡}
Belgium (BRMA)	Platinum	20,000^{‡}
Canada (Music Canada)	4× Platinum	320,000^{‡}
Denmark (IFPI Danmark)	2× Platinum	180,000^{‡}
France (SNEP)	Gold	100,000^{‡}
Germany (BVMI)	Platinum	400,000^{‡}
Italy (FIMI)	Platinum	50,000^{‡}
New Zealand (RMNZ)	7× Platinum	210,000^{‡}
Norway (IFPI Norway)	Platinum	60,000^{‡}
Spain (Promusicae)	Platinum	60,000^{‡}
United Kingdom (BPI)	Platinum	600,000^{‡}
United States (RIAA)	5× Platinum	5,000,000^{‡}
Streaming
Sweden (GLF)	2× Platinum	16,000,000^{†}
^{‡} Sales+streaming figures based on certification alone.^{†} Streaming-only figures based on certification alone.
