= I'm So Tired... =

2019 song by Lauv and Troye Sivan

Single by Lauv and Troye Sivan

from the album How I'm Feeling
- Released: January 24, 2019
- Genre: Electropop
- Length: 2:42
- Label: AWAL
- Songwriters: Lauv; Leland; Oscar Görres; Michael Pollack; Troye Sivan
- Producers: Lauv; Oscar Görres

Lauv singles chronology
"There's No Way" (2018)	"I'm So Tired..." (2019)	"Drugs & the Internet" (2019)

Troye Sivan singles chronology
"Somebody to Love" (2018)	"I'm so tired..." (2019)	"Love Me Wrong" (2019)

Music video
- "I'm So Tired..." on YouTube

"I'm So Tired..." (stylized in lowercase) is a song recorded by American singer Lauv and Australian singer-songwriter Troye Sivan. It was released on January 24, 2019, and was later featured as the lead single on Lauv's debut album, How I'm Feeling. The song reached number eight on the UK Singles Chart, becoming both artists' first top 10 there. It also reached the top 5 in Ireland, top 10 in New Zealand, and the top 15 in Australia.

== Background ==
Sivan remembers "Fully flipping out" upon being shown the track by Lauv during a writing session. The track went through several variations. At one point, the chorus featured four on the floor drum beats, although this version "felt really good". According to Sivan, it felt like a remix and that element was eventually dropped. Lauv would go on to call the single an "accidental duet" explaining " he [Sivan] just sounded too good singing it, so I think it was just natural to do the record together.".

== Critical reception ==
Rolling Stone called the track a "snappy cut" that "dump[s] on modern lovelorn ballads like Coldplay's 'Hurts Like Heaven' and Lorde's 'Buzzcut Season'", with Lauv and Sivan singing about how they are "so tired of love songs". Lake Schatz of Consequence of Sound called it a "reflective, sobering listen".

The song was nominated by the Best Pop Award at the 2019 Melon Music Awards but lost out to Billie Eilish "Bad Guy".

== Music videos ==
YouTube includes a visuallzer by Troye Sivan and a visualizer by Lauv. The difference between the two visualizers is that Lauv's version is 2 seconds longer than Troye Sivan's version. Also, Lauv drives the car in Troye Sivan's version, while Troye Sivan drives the car in Lauv's version.

A music video for the song was released on February 14, 2019, or Valentine's Day. It shows the two singing and getting in the middle of a dating couple, while still unnoticed. In the end, Lauv slams the car's door, starting a car alarm and gaining their attention while walking away.

== Charts ==
=== Weekly charts ===
Chart (2019)	Peak position
Australia (ARIA)	11
Austria (Ö3 Austria Top 40)	22
Belgium (Ultratop 50 Flanders)	37
Belgium (Ultratop 50 Wallonia)	45
Canada Hot 100 (Billboard)	57
Czech Republic Airplay (ČNS IFPI)	42
Czech Republic Singles Digital (ČNS IFPI)	19
Denmark (Tracklisten)	40
Germany (GfK)	42
Hungary (Rádiós Top 40)	23
Hungary (Single Top 40)	26
Hungary (Stream Top 40)	17
Ireland (IRMA)	4
Latvia (LAIPA)	7
Lithuania (AGATA)	7
Malaysia (RIM)	3
Netherlands (Single Top 100)	63
New Zealand (Recorded Music NZ)	9
Norway (VG-lista)	21
Romania (Airplay 100)	33
Scottish Singles Sales (Official Charts)	7
Singapore (RIAS)	3
Slovakia Airplay (ČNS IFPI)	45
Slovakia Singles Digital (ČNS IFPI)	10
Slovenia (SloTop50)	47
South Korea (Gaon)	113
Sweden (Sverigetopplistan)	37
Switzerland (Schweizer Hitparade)	40
UK Singles (Official Charts)	8
UK Indie (Official Charts)	1
US Billboard Hot 100	81
US Adult Pop Airplay (Billboard)	21
US Pop Airplay (Billboard)	21
US Dance Airplay (Billboard)	35

=== Year-end charts ===
Chart (2019)	Position
Australia (ARIA)	42
Austria (Ö3 Austria Top 40)	71
Hungary (Rádiós Top 40)	60
Ireland (IRMA)	44
Latvia (LAIPA)	35
New Zealand (Recorded Music NZ)	35
South Korea (Gaon)	182
Switzerland (Schweizer Hitparade)	100
Tokyo (Tokio Hot 100)	62
UK Singles (Official Charts Company)	72

== Certifications ==
Region	Certification	Certified units/sales
Australia (ARIA)	3× Platinum	210,000^{‡}
Austria (IFPI Austria)	Gold	15,000^{‡}
Belgium (BRMA)	Gold	20,000^{‡}
Canada (Music Canada)	Platinum	80,000^{‡}
Denmark (IFPI Danmark)	Platinum	90,000^{‡}
Germany (BVMI)	Gold	200,000^{‡}
Italy (FIMI)	Gold	35,000^{‡}
New Zealand (RMNZ)	3× Platinum	90,000^{‡}
Spain (Promusicae)	Gold	30,000^{‡}
United Kingdom (BPI)	Platinum	600,000^{‡}
United States (RIAA)	2× Platinum	2,000,000^{‡}
^{‡} Sales+streaming figures based on certification alone.
