= Feelings (Lauv song) =

2019 single by Lauv

Single by Lauv

from the album How I'm Feeling
- Released: September 19, 2019
- Genre: Pop
- Length: 3:10
- Label: AWAL
- Songwriters: Andrea Rosario; Ari Leff; Jonathan Simpson; Michael Pollack
- Producers: Johnny Simpson; Lauv

Lauv singles chronology
"Fuck, I'm Lonely" (2019)	"Feelings" (2019)	"Sims" (2019)

Audio video
- "Feelings" on YouTube

"Feelings" is a song by American singer and songwriter Lauv. It was released on September 19, 2019, as the fifth single from his debut studio album How I'm Feeling.

== Composition and lyrics ==
"Feelings" is a song about unrequited love in which Lauv "[is] asking a girl if she wants to cross the line and take their feelings to the next level".

== Credits and personnel ==
Credits adapted from Tidal.

- Lauv – vocals, songwriter, producer
- Johnny Simpson – songwriter, producer
- Andrea Rosario – songwriter
- Michael Pollack – songwriter

== Charts ==
Chart (2019)	Peak position
Australia (ARIA)	53
Ireland (IRMA)	80
Lithuania (AGATA)	56
Malaysia (RIM)	18
New Zealand Hot Singles (RMNZ)	2
Singapore (RIAS)	5
Sweden Heatseeker (Sverigetopplistan)	17
UK Indie (OCC)	29
US Digital Song Sales (Billboard)	26

== Certifications ==
Certifications for "Feelings"
Region	Certification	Certified units/sales
Australia (ARIA)	Platinum	70,000^{‡}
New Zealand (RMNZ)	Gold	15,000^{‡}
^{‡} Sales+streaming figures based on certification alone.

== Release history ==
Country	Date	Format	Label	Ref.
Various	September 19, 2019	Digital download; streaming	AWAL	
