= Sad Forever =

2019 song by Lauv

Single by Lauv

from the album How I'm Feeling
- Released: May 31, 2019
- Genre: Pop
- Length: 3:23
- Label: AWAL
- Songwriters: Ari Leff; Dallas Koehlke; Jack Torrey; Michael Pollack
- Producers: DallasK; Lauv; Halatrax

Lauv singles chronology
"Drugs & the Internet" (2019)	"Sad Forever" (2019)	"Fuck, I'm Lonely" (2019)

Audio sample
- file; help

Music video
- "Sad Forever" on YouTube

"Sad Forever" is a song by American singer and songwriter Lauv, released as a single on May 31, 2019. It is the third single from Lauv's debut studio album, How I'm Feeling. Like other songs from the album, "Sad Forever" addresses his mental health. All proceeds from the song are donated to charities that address the stigma of mental health, including Time to Change and Beyond Blue.

== Background ==
Lauv (who struggles from OCD and depression), wrote the song while on his 2019 Asian tour. Written in first person, Sad Forever discusses living with multiple mental health conditions and the social stigma surrounding them. Specific topics include Lauv's experience with depersonalization, grief, insomnia, and the usage of psychiatric medication.

== Music video ==
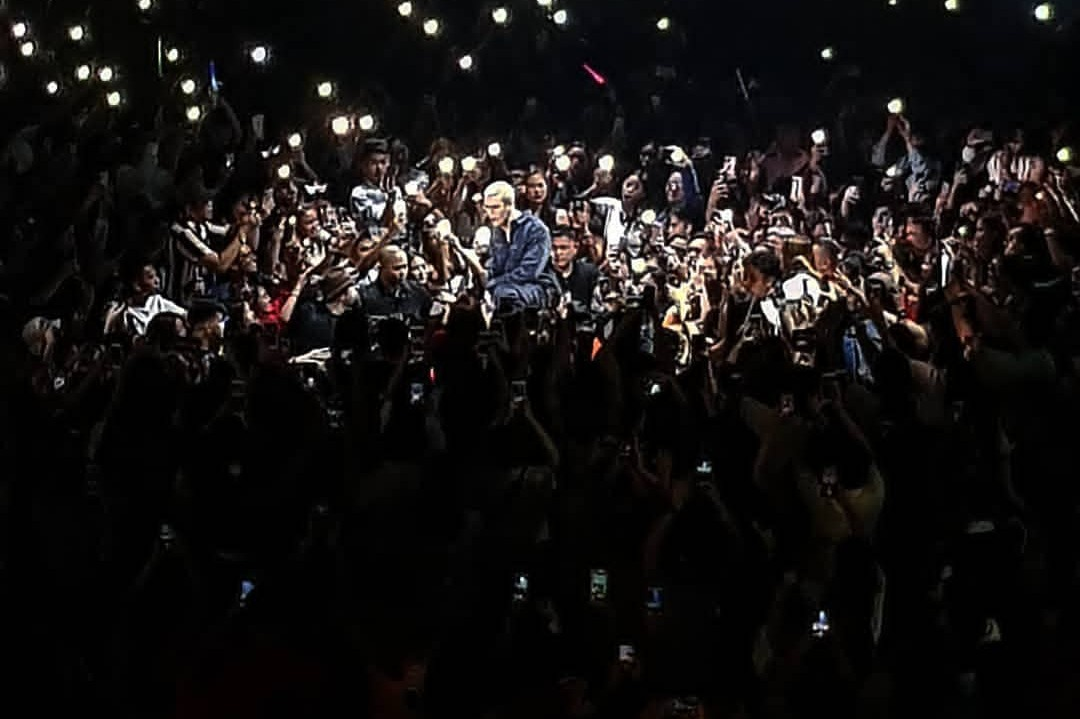
LAUV performing his single while on shooting on a music video at the Smart Araneta Coliseum during his Manila tour last May 20, 2019.

The music video was released on YouTube on May 31, 2019. Lauv premiered the song during the Manila Leg of his Asian Tour on May 20, 2019 at the Smart Araneta Coliseum and eventually shot the music video in one take afterwards. During the concert, Lauv stated that "This is officially the biggest headline show that I ever played," and he wanted to have the video shot in Manila.

== Charts ==
Chart (2019)	Peak position
New Zealand Hot Singles (RMNZ)	18
Singapore (RIAS)	23
