= There's No Way (Lauv song) =

2018 song by American singer-songwriter Lauv

Single by Lauv featuring Julia Michaels
- Released: September 27, 2018
- Genre: Bubblegum pop
- Length: 2:54
- Label: AWAL
- Songwriters: Ari Leff; Justin Tranter; Julia Michaels; Ian Kirkpatrick
- Producer: Lauv

Lauv singles chronology
"Superhero" (2018)	"There's No Way" (2018)	"i'm so tired" (2019)

Julia Michaels singles chronology
"Light Me Up" (2018)	"There's No Way" (2018)	"Lie to Me" (2018)

Music video
- "There’s No Way" on YouTube

"There's No Way" is a song recorded by American singer-songwriter Lauv featuring American singer-songwriter Julia Michaels. It was released on September 27, 2018.

== Background and composition ==
Lauv described the process of creating "There's No Way", stating: "The first time [me and Michaels] met we didn’t even write a song, we just talked about life and emo bands and stuff. A few days later me, her, Justin Tranter and Ian Kirkpatrick got into the room and wrote 'There's No Way.'"

"There's No Way" is a "flirtatious" bubblegum pop song with a length of two minutes and fifty four seconds. It is in the key of D major and moves at a tempo of 147 beats per minute. A love song, it has been described as a "call-and-response tale of romantic feelings." Michaels described the song as being "about wanting to be with someone, but sometimes the timing is wrong."

== Critical reception ==
Robin Murray of Clash called the song a "beautiful new single."

== Music video ==
An accompanying music video was released to promote the single. The singers portray bandmates on tour who share an array of intimate moments, despite having their own lovers. The video ends with the two singers going their separate ways.

== Live performances ==
Lauv and Julia Michaels performed "There's No Way" on The Late Show with Stephen Colbert on October 1, 2018. On November 28, 2018, they again performed the song on The Late Late Show with James Corden.

== Track listing ==
Digital download

1. "There's No Way" (featuring Julia Michaels) - 2:54

Remixes EP

1. "There's No Way" (featuring Julia Michaels) [Alle Farben Remix] - 3:07
2. "There's No Way" (featuring Julia Michaels) [Synapson Remix] - 3:18
3. "There's No Way" (featuring Julia Michaels) [MYRNE Remix] - 4:29
4. "There's No Way" (featuring Julia Michaels) [Cat Dealers Remix] - 2:57

Live from Box Fresh, London, 2018

1. There's No Way (feat. Julia Michaels) [Live from Box Fresh, London, 2018] - 2:44

== Charts ==
Chart (2018)	Peak position
Australia (ARIA)	37
Belgium (Ultratip Flanders)	17
Belgium (Ultratip Wallonia)	19
Canada Hot AC (Billboard)	43
Ireland (IRMA)	55
Greece International Digital Singles (IFPI)	75
Lithuania (AGATA)	34
Mexico Ingles Airplay (Billboard)	13
New Zealand Hot Singles (RMNZ)	10
Singapore (RIAS)	13
Sweden (Sverigetopplistan)	94
Switzerland (Schweizer Hitparade)	86
UK Indie (OCC)	29
US Digital Song Sales (Billboard)	33
US Mainstream Top 40 (Billboard)	32

== Certifications ==
Region	Certification	Certified units/sales
Australia (ARIA)	Platinum	70,000^{‡}
Denmark (IFPI Danmark)	Gold	45,000^{‡}
New Zealand (RMNZ)	Platinum	30,000^{‡}
United States (RIAA)	Gold	500,000^{‡}
^{‡} Sales+streaming figures based on certification alone.
