= Modern Loneliness =

2020 single by Lauv

Single by Lauv

from the album How I'm Feeling
- Released: February 20, 2020
- Length: 4:12
- Label: AWAL
- Songwriters: Ari Leff; Jonathan Simpson; Mike Elizondo; Michael Matosic; Michael Pollack
- Producers: Lauv; Johnny Simpson; Mike Elizondo

Lauv singles chronology
"Tattoos Together" (2020)	"Modern Loneliness" (2020)	"Dishes" (2020)

Music video
- "Modern Loneliness" on YouTube

Visualizer video
- "Modern Loneliness" on YouTube

"Modern Loneliness" is a song by American singer-songwriter Lauv released on February 20, 2020. It was released as the tenth and final single from his debut album, How I'm Feeling which was released on March 6 of the same year. The song was written by the artist, Jonathan Simpson, Mike Elizondo, Michael Matosic, and Michael Pollack, with the first three listed also receiving production credits. A shorter version was also released along with the full-length track, with an acoustic version being released on How I'm Feeling (The Extras).

A song revolving around feeling lonely in the modern age, the lyrics express that although people are more connected than ever due to the rise of social media, this connection still has its negative effects as most are not genuine and does not replace real-life relationships. It received positive reviews from critics with a consensus view on what it stands for. The accompanying music video, directed by Jason Lester, revolved around Lauv using social media but not feeling happy nor positive while using it, relating to its lyrics. Fans were featured on the video as well, with some dancing with him to the track, and others through making a cover of the song. The single peaked at number 14 on Billboard's US Bubbling Under Hot 100 chart.

== Background and impact ==
Lauv has stated about the song "It's this super, super meaningful song to me...[which is] basically about... I feel like these days, I'm so used to never being alone but feeling so alone. It's so easy to feel totally isolated even if there's people around you. I just think it's this condition that a lot of people in my generation feel." also noting that it's one of his favorites off the album.

The Blue Boy Foundation, started by Lauv, later hosted a virtual panel based on the song's name, called "Breaking Modern Loneliness: A Conversation on Mental Health". The panel focused on mental health awareness and the impact of social distancing during the COVID-19 pandemic. The event was held on May 1, 2020 which coincided with the start of Mental Health Awareness Month. Other collaborators included Canadian singer Alessia Cara, English singer Anne-Marie, and Mexican singer and actress Sofía Reyes.

== Composition and lyrics ==
"Modern Loneliness"
"Modern Loneliness" is a song featuring a piano background and an electronic beat accompanying Lauv's voice. As the song approaches the final half of the track, a guitar, bass, and a chorus of voices appear as support.

The song lasts for 4 minutes and 12 seconds, composed using common time in the key A♭ major, having a tempo of 82 beats per minute. Lauv's vocals range from a low of E♭_{3} to a high of C_{5}. A piano ballad starts the song off, having a finger-snapping beat, incorporating electronic rhythms, adding guitar and bass, and slowly building into having a choir as it approaches the final choruses, with many describing the song as "anthemic". A shorter version of the song which lasts 3 minutes and 45 seconds was also released along with the original, cutting off the short piano introduction and having a shorter second chorus when compared to the full-length track.

"Modern Loneliness" addresses the lack of real-life connections with people, replacing such connections with social media instead, leading to people feeling more lonely in the new era of technology. In an interview with Julia Hope from Clash, Lauv states:

Meanwhile, before all of this [social media] existed – we would just be having conversations in person with one another. You get through the awkwardness and eventually get to know each other, because you’re in front of each other and have no choice – where as now, every relationship you have online is so ‘immediate’ that you don’t experience any of the feelings you should when meeting a new person. Humans are built for real community and connection, and I think we are missing that from our world right now, due to social media...[It's] not real and human connections. I think that’s why as a generation, we feel so alone all of the time.

This is especially highlighted in the chorus, with the lyrics "Modern loneliness, we're never alone / But always depressed, yeah / Love my friends to death / But I never call and I never text, yeah". "This is my favorite song on the album and the most important song I feel I've ever made. There is a lot of loneliness out there. We all feel it", Lauv said during a press release.

== Critical reception ==
Critics generally had empathetic reviews of the song due to its content, with many relating to the situation it addresses. Madeline Roth from MTV News says that the track "marks one of his most introspective and relatable releases yet" and is "an anthemic singalong". Hollianne Lao from The Daily Campus adds that he "draw[s] attention to young adults’ more open discussion of mental health than previous generations...the crisp sound of the music and his honest words are powerful enough to resonate with me." Jenifer Gonsalves from Meaww states that the song is "absolutely gutwrenching [and is] a difficult reality to face but it is also one most of us can't help but empathize with and relate to." Rhian Daly from NME has a similar comment, mentioning that "it’s bleakly, understatedly funny but also completely devastating." DIY's Elly Watson also says that "its set-to-be anthemic chorus...will pull on the iciest of heartstrings." with Danny Cao of Medium Magazine adding a statement saying "the lyrics are honest and amazing, but the chorus is the best: sad and uplifting at the same time."

Some also call the track the highlight of its album, How I'm Feeling, with Malika Padin from Riot calling it its "the best track". Sophia Simon-Bashall of The Line of Best Fit also says that "Modern Loneliness" is "the greatest insight into how not only Lauv, but the generation he speaks to, is feeling." and calls it "an ode to the contradictions of contemporary culture and the cognitive dissonance of wanting to feel better but not doing anything to get there," adding that it's "a song destined for slightly watery-eyed but vitalising sing-alongs." "Leff [Lauv] employs a sad, lonely tone [and] even so, the music is quite beautiful, dynamic, and eventually, groovy", a reviewer from The Musical Hype adds.

== Music video ==
=== Background ===
The track has two videos—a visualizer and a music video. The visualizer was released on the same day as the single, while the music video was released on April 16, 2020, nearly two months later. Lauv and Jason Lester - the music video's director—planned to film the video in early March but was cancelled due to the COVID-19 outbreak. The original plan was to reunite 100 of his fans with friends they had lost contact with, closely relating to the song's lyrics. They were able to replace this plan by instead featuring fans dueting the song with him in the video.

=== Synopsis ===
The visualizer shows Lauv laying in a grass field with yellow flowers while singing along to the song, the camera zooming in and out of frame and changing positions. As the song approaches the second chorus, seven people appear as the camera zooms out, all laying down along with him with some distance, signifying their similar feeling of isolation. The video ends with the scene zooming out to show the eight of them surrounded by flowers in the field.

The music video directed by Jason Lester and produced by Laura Burhenn / Our Secret Handshake premiered on Apr 16, 2020. It features a day in Lauv's life, with him screen recording his phone and going on different social media platforms. Throughout the video, he gets messages and calls from his mom and dad, in which he chooses to ignore it. A scene captures him typing a tweet saying "you ever think of all the people you still think about that u never reach out to anymore? isn’t that sad", connecting to the song's lyrics. Using the app Calm, he attempts to meditate, but receives several notifications that distract him. He makes multiple posts on Instagram and uses the "Live" feature. He then records himself at a party, dancing with people, and getting drunk. Multiple fans were featured in the video dancing with him to the song using the "Duet" feature on TikTok and some were featured as he watched covers of the track on YouTube. Towards the end, he starts to text back his friends and family and calls his parents back.

=== Reception ===
Jenifer Gonsalves of Meaww says that "the [music] video [is] a powerful commentary on society and our relationship with social media, and the feeling of being 'alone together', and it is so remarkably relevant to the times we find ourselves in." DIY called the video "heartwarming", with Dork adding that its release was "well-timed".

=== Release history ===
Date	Title	Director	Link
20 February 2020	"Modern Loneliness" [Official Visualizer]		
2 April 2020	"Modern Loneliness (acoustic)" [Official Video]	Jason Lester	
16 April 2020	"Modern Loneliness" [Official Video]	Jason Lester	

== Track listing and formats ==
Along with the full-length and single version of the song, an acoustic version was also released as a part of How I'm Feeling (The Extras) on April 3, 2020. All proceeds from said version will be used in assisting the poor in health care as a result of the COVID-19 pandemic.

- Digital download
  1. Modern Loneliness – 4:12
  2. Modern Loneliness (single version)– 3:45

== Personnel ==
Credits adapted from Tidal.

- Ari Leff — vocals, songwriter, producer
- Jonathan Simpson — songwriter, producer
- Mike Elizondo — songwriter, producer
- Michael Matosic — songwriter
- Michael Pollack — songwriter

== Charts ==
Chart (2020)	Peak position
Belgium (Ultratip Bubbling Under Flanders)	10
Canada CHR/Top 40 (Billboard)	36
Canada Hot AC (Billboard)	49
Ireland (IRMA)	57
Mexico Airplay (Billboard)	44
Netherlands (Single Tip)	25
New Zealand Hot Singles (RMNZ)	13
Singapore (RIAS)	14
UK Indie (OCC)	45
US Bubbling Under Hot 100 (Billboard)	14
US Adult Pop Airplay (Billboard)	37
US Pop Airplay (Billboard)	23
