= Lauv =

American musician (born 1994)

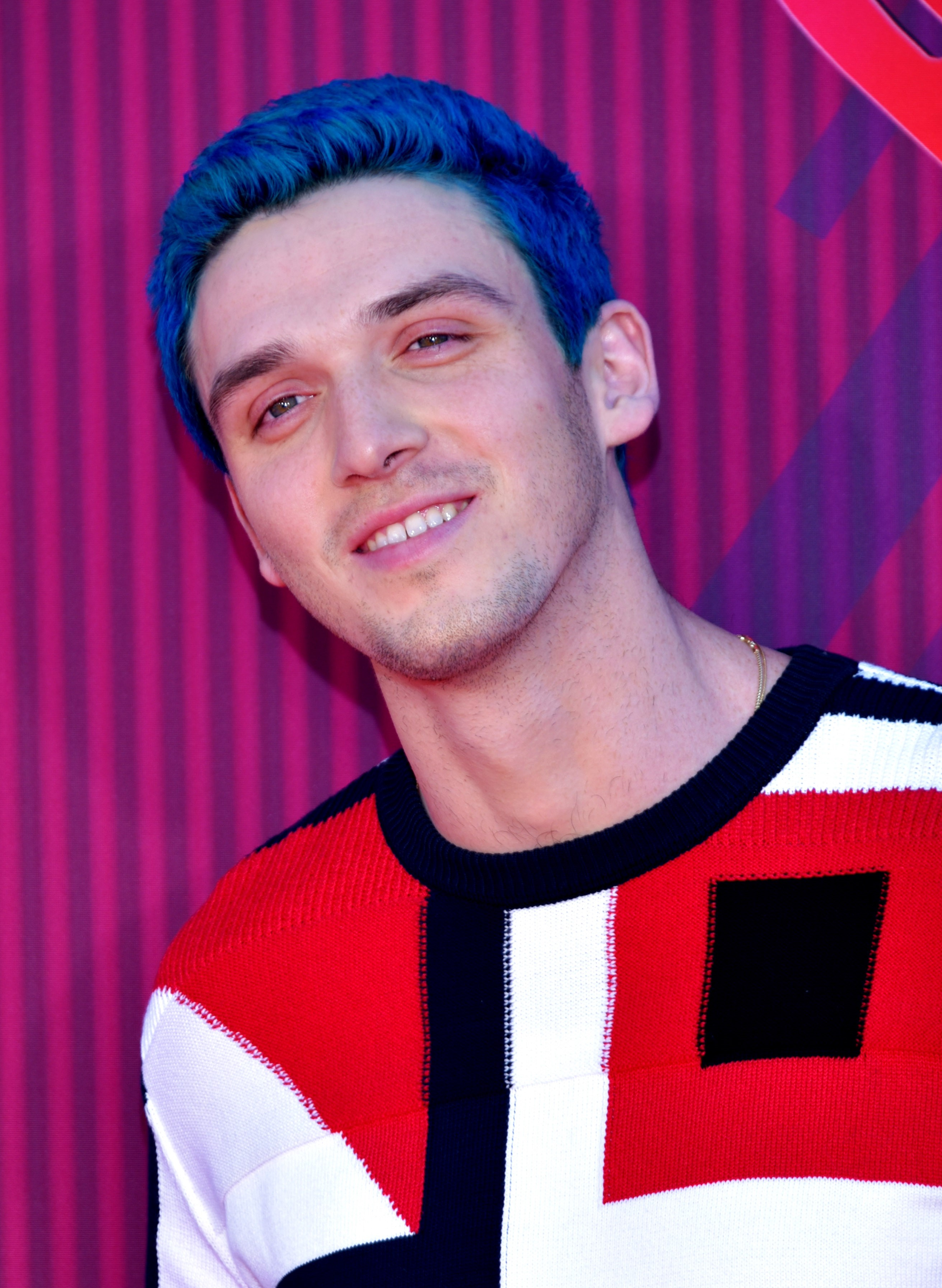
- Lauv at the 2019 iHeartRadio Music Awards

Background information
- Also known as: Somersault Sunday
- Born: Ari Staprāns Leff; August 8, 1994 (age 32); San Francisco, California, U.S.
- Origin: Wayne, Pennsylvania, U.S.
- Education: New York University (BM)
- Genres: Pop; electropop; R&B; alt-pop
- Occupations: Musician; singer; songwriter; record producer
- Instruments: Vocals; guitar; piano; drums
- Years active: 2008–present
- Labels: Virgin; AWAL
- Website: lauvsongs.com

Ari Staprans Leff (born August 8, 1994), known professionally as Lauv (/laʊv/), is an American singer, songwriter, and record producer. He is best known for his breakout hit "I Like Me Better"; included on his compilation album I Met You When I Was 18 (The Playlist), which was released in 2018. His debut album, How I'm Feeling, was released on March 6, 2020, and debuted at number 16 on the US Billboard 200. Lauv has also written songs for other artists such as "Boys" by Charli XCX and "No Promises" by Cheat Codes (featuring Demi Lovato).

== Early life ==
Leff was born in San Francisco, California. His father, Stuart Leff, is Jewish, and his mother, Silvija Staprāne, is Latvian. He spent his early childhood in a suburb of Atlanta, Georgia, and then his family relocated to a suburb of Philadelphia, Pennsylvania. He went to Radnor High School. As a child, he was interested in music and took piano and viola lessons before learning how to play the guitar at the age of 11. Leff studied guitar, recording, sound design, production, voice, and songwriting with Jason Brook Zimmerman, co-owner and founder of the music lesson organization Traveling Musician. He started writing songs in middle school, at around 14 years old. Many of his songs during this period focused on heartbreak and breakups, despite at the time, never having had a girlfriend. During his time in high school, he played in several bands and studied jazz before moving on to electronic music. He has said that his sister Aiva would drive him and his friends on tour, where they often played "to zero people". His early musical influences were Owl City and Never Shout Never. He would listen to Owl City's Maybe I'm Dreaming and study the production style and the abstract lyrical themes that use "dreamy" and "whimsical" images to describe love. He also adopted the artist name, Somersault Sunday, and published some songs and extended plays on his Myspace account.

After graduating highschool, Leff decided to pursue a behind-the-scenes role in music seeing that his career was not taking off. He chose to study music technology at New York University's Steinhardt School. While at university, he studied abroad in Prague and was a member of the Zeta Psi fraternity. He spent two of his four years at NYU as a studio intern for Jungle City Studios, where artists such as Jay-Z, Justin Timberlake, and Alicia Keys recorded. During his junior year, he signed a publishing deal after the success of his song "The Other" but he decided to finish university and enjoy it having only a year left and because he was also feeling fortunate enough to be able to go there.

== Career ==
=== 2008–2012: Early years and Somersault Sunday ===
Leff began writing music at an early age. When he was 12, he started his first rock duo with his best friend Mike Wagenheim, and by age 13, the two teens started a metal band. After starting to try and write music, Leff began experimenting with an acoustic guitar and some synth sounds. A few months later, he wrote his own solo acoustic song called Parting Ways. Leff then formed his first solo music project, Somersault Sunday, when he was 14 years old on April 28, 2008. He started it first "as a side project, just for fun," but continued it after receiving enthusiastic online response.

Somersault Sunday is an electro-infused pop rock solo-project. Under the Somersault Sunday project, he was able to release three extended plays namely, Parting Ways EP (2009), Intermission – EP (2010), and Phone Calls & Weekends (2010). Trevor Dahl of Cheat Codes (who was then making music under the moniker Plug in Stereo) featured on his track "Wishful Thinking" from the Intermission EP. The Phone Calls & Weekends EP, was produced by Kevin Gates, who also mixed and produced some of the songs of Never Shout Never, The Ready Set, and the late Cady Groves. He posted his songs on MySpace along with some song covers, and kept close contact with his fans through the platform. He had a band playing with him during live shows and concerts. Leff was known for his basement concerts in his early middle and high school years. He even won a coveted spot to perform during the 2011 Vans Warped Tour.

=== 2014–2016: Beginnings and Lost in the Light ===
Leff focused on writing and producing for other artists during college, straying from his personal songwriting style. During his second year, he stumbled upon an interview with Paul Simon, in which Simon described his songwriting approach as a process of uncovering his innermost buried feelings. The interview helped Leff to get in touch with the way he used to write. Afterwards, Leff adopted the stage name Lauv, Latvian for "lion" (lauva), as a nod to his mother's heritage. His first name, Ari, means "lion" in Hebrew, and his zodiac sign is Leo.

While getting over a break-up in fall of 2014, he co-wrote "The Other" with Michael Matosic. Although he was focused on writing potential songs for other artists, he felt "The Other" worked better as his own song. It would be the first song he released under the name Lauv. With "The Other", he also discovered his stripped-down electronic pop sound. The song is a fusion of rhythm and blues and indie-pop with influence from jazz guitar. The song gained blog attention and, after he uploaded it to SoundCloud in 2015, went viral, peaking at number three on blog aggregator Hype Machine, and hitting the Global Top 100 on Spotify.

After graduating from NYU, Lauv signed to the publishing company Prescription Songs.

On September 25, 2015, Lauv released his debut EP, Lost in the Light, which featured "The Other". Then, apart from releasing the single "Question" featuring Travis Mills in 2016, Lauv worked on writing and producing songs for other artists.

Most notably, he co-wrote and co-produced "No Promises" for Cheat Codes and Demi Lovato, which reached number 7 on the Billboard Pop Songs chart. In an interview with iHeartRadio, Lauv stated that he had been friends with Trevor Dahl from Cheat Codes since "back in the Myspace days."

=== 2017–2018: Breakthrough and Asia tour ===
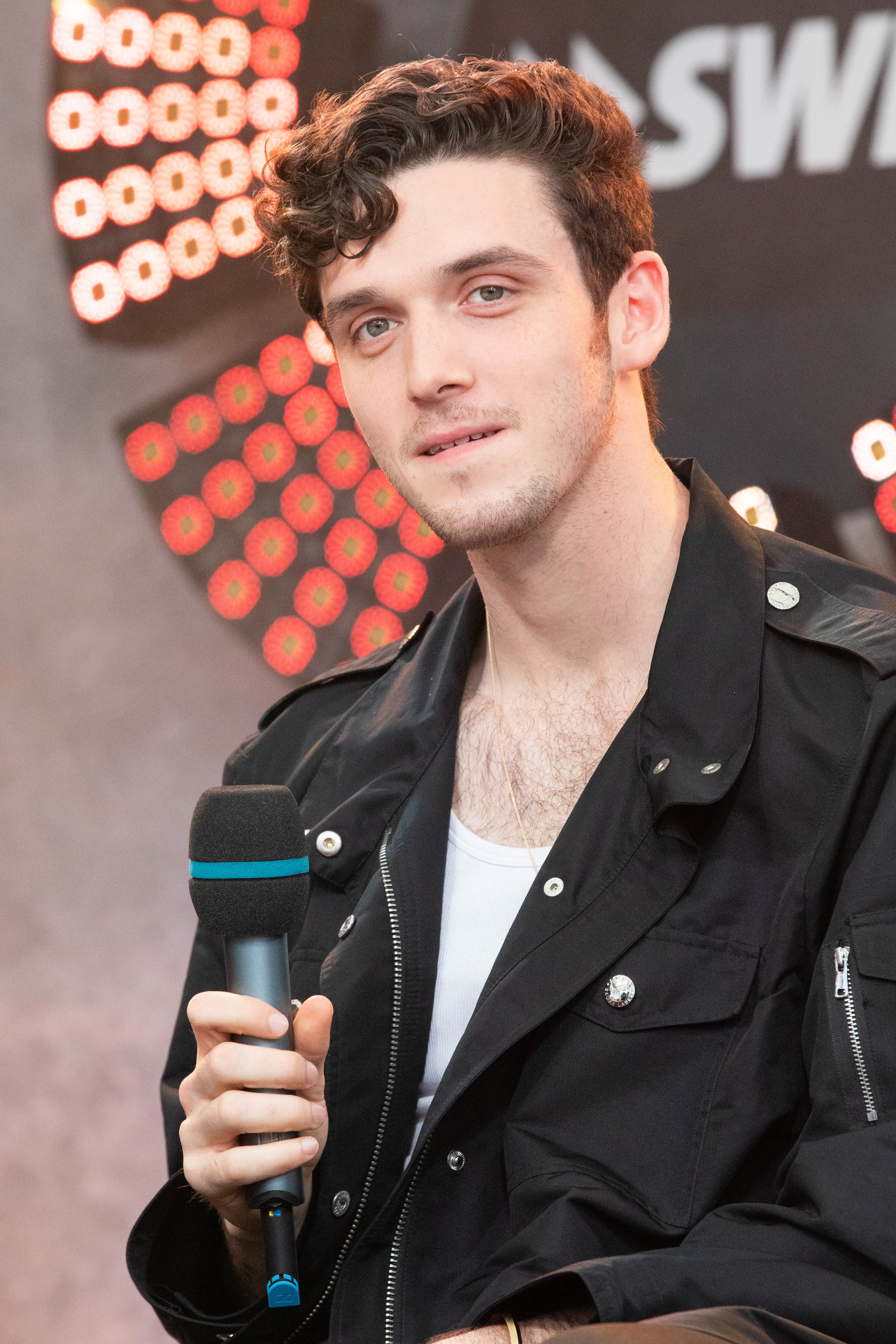
Lauv in 2018

On May 19, 2017, Leff released the single "I Like Me Better", an up-tempo track inspired by his relationship that began shortly after he moved to New York City. It peaked at number 27 on the Billboard Hot 100, earned platinum certification in seven countries (including the US), and gold certification in three. As of March 9, 2021, the song has amassed over 2 billion streams on Spotify.

In 2017, he headlined his own Late Nights, Deep Talks tour, in which he performed in eight cities across the United States. The tour began on May 23 in Los Angeles and concluded on June 7 in New York City. On July 9, he also performed at Summerfest in Milwaukee, Wisconsin.

It was announced on September 4, 2017, that Leff would be joining Ed Sheeran as the supporting act on his Divide Tour in Asia. Several of Ed Sheeran's Asia tour dates were cancelled or rescheduled as a result of injuries he sustained from a bicycle accident, but Leff proceeded with promotional tours in cities such as Manila, Philippines, officially kicking off the Divide Tour with Ed Sheeran in Singapore on November 11, 2017.

Leff embarked on his first world tour, I Met You When I Was 18, in the first half of 2018. The tour began on January 18 in Seattle, Washington and concluded on April 29 in Oslo, Norway. Artists Jeremy Zucker and Ashe joined him as supporting acts in most of the North American tour dates. During the tour, he had a box named "My Blue Thoughts", in which he told fans to write down anything they wanted to and put it inside. He commemorated the notes on his blog mybluethoughts.world. On August 30, 2018, Leff released the single "Superhero", a song inspired by a note from the box. He performed at Lollapalooza in Chicago on August 3, 2018.

In May 2018, Leff released I Met You When I Was 18 (The Playlist), a 17-track collection of new and previously released tracks, including the singles "I Like Me Better" and "The Other", that he had been working on over the course of a few years. It has also been described as a "playlist" that Lauv updated gradually until completing it in May 2018. It chronicles his move to New York City and the first time he fell in love. By August 2018, it had been streamed over 1 billion times on Spotify.

In June 2018, Leff ranked number one on Billboard's Emerging Artists chart, dated June 9. As of September 29, he had been at the top spot of the chart for a total of 13 weeks.

He released the single "There's No Way", a collaboration with Julia Michaels, on September 27, 2018.

In November 2018, Lauv announced his first headlining tour starting the next year in Asia, including India, Singapore, Thailand, Philippines, Hong Kong, Indonesia, and Japan. It began on May 13, 2019, in Mumbai, India and concluded on May 30 in Tokyo.

=== 2019–2020: How I'm Feeling ===
Lauv released the single "I'm So Tired..." with Troye Sivan on January 24, 2019. They first met at a rehearsal space, and after writing another song that did not work out, Lauv played Sivan the chorus of "I'm So Tired..." which he had written a few days prior. Sivan liked it and they wrote and recorded the rest of the track together. They performed the song on Jimmy Kimmel Live on February 7, 2019.

On April 25, 2019, Lauv released the single and music video for "Drugs & the Internet", which he says he wrote when he was struggling with feelings of emptiness and depression. It is the second single from his debut studio album How I'm Feeling. He also announced that month that he would unveil his debut album How I'm Feeling track by track as it is being recorded, simultaneously with the tour. A little under a month later, on May 20, 2019, Lauv held his first ever arena show at the Smart Araneta Coliseum. Lauv also debuted "Sad Forever" during the show, which gave way to becoming the music video for the single. During the concert, Lauv stated that "This is officially the biggest headline show that I ever played," and he wanted to have the video shot in Manila. Eleven days later, on May 31, 2019, Lauv released the single and music video for "Sad Forever". He also announced that all proceeds from the song will 100% be donated to mental health organizations that work to remove stigma around mental illness. He has raised over $150,000 to date.

On August 1, 2019, he released "Fuck, I'm Lonely", a collaboration with British singer Anne-Marie for the soundtrack of the third season of 13 Reasons Why. The track was also included on his debut album. As of March 9, 2021, the song has amassed over 350 million streams on Spotify. The album is being promoted with the How I'm Feeling Tour, which began in Washington, D.C., on October 5, 2019, and will conclude in Perth, Australia, on November 26, 2020. It will travel throughout the United States, Europe, New Zealand, and Australia. Special guests for the tour include bülow, Chelsea Cutler, and Carlie Hanson. He will be supported in the Asian leg of the tour by American singer-songwriter and social media personality mxmtoon. On September 19, 2019, Lauv released "Feelings", Two weeks later, on October 3, Lauv released the single "Sims". A "short film" for the single was released on October 28. On October 18, 2019, Lauv made his debut in K-pop through his collaboration with BTS for the song "Make It Right", which is an ode to ARMY (BTS fans). On November 14, 2019, Lauv teamed up with LANY for Mean It, with the music video following up on December 17. On December 22, 2019, Lauv made his debut in Bollywood through a collaboration with composer Rochak Kohli for the song "Dil Na Jaaneya", which features on the soundtrack of Bollywood film Good Newwz

On January 2, 2020, Lauv released the eighth single and music video for his debut album How I'm Feeling, titled "Changes". Two weeks later, on January 16, 2020, Lauv released the ninth single and music video for How I'm Feeling, titled "Tattoos Together". Lauv sings about getting tattoos with his significant other as a way to remember each other should they ever fall out. On February 20, 2020, Lauv released the tenth single and visualizer for How I'm Feeling, titled "Modern Loneliness".

On March 6, 2020, Lauv released How I'm Feeling, unveiling three collaborations. "Who" with Jimin and Jungkook of BTS, "Canada" with Alessia Cara, and "El Tejano" with Sofia Reyes, with the latter receiving a music video released on May 19. Additionally, singles released the previous year, such as "Mean It" with LANY, "Fuck, I'm Lonely" with Anne-Marie and "I'm So Tired..." with Troye Sivan were added onto the album. Exactly two months later, on May 6, 2020, Lauv followed up with an additional song which he stated was "going to be on the album", titled "Love Like That", which is a song about how Lauv struggles with reciprocating love.

On May 1, 2020, Lauv marked the beginning of Mental Health Awareness Month by teaming up with Alessia Cara, Anne-Marie and Sofia Reyes for a conversation regarding mental health during the COVID-19 pandemic, titled "Breaking Modern Loneliness". On May 22, Lauv once again teamed up with artists mxmtoon and Jeremy Zucker, alongside Vivek Murthy for a three part one-on-one conversation regarding mental health.

On June 24, 2020, Lauv released the Without You, with tracks such as "Mine", "Dishes", "Love Somebody" and "Miss Me", a demo released by Lauv on SoundCloud a month prior. The music video for the song "Dishes" was also released. Also worth noting is that all songs on the EP were written and produced during the early months of the COVID-19 pandemic. Six days later, on June 30, 2020, Lauv collaborated with Ellie Goulding for "Slow Grenade". Over the remainder of the summer, Lauv collaborated with many artists for a variety of songs, such as "if i were u" with blackbear and "Sweet and Sour" with artists Tyga and Jawsh 685. Most notably, Lauv, alongside Saweetie collaborated with Ava Max for the remixed "second" version of "Kings & Queens", which was released on August 6, 2020, titled "Kings & Queens, Pt. 2".

On October 10, 2020, in honor of World Mental Health Day, Lauv once again teamed up with artists, creators and experts from around the world as part of an effort to erase stigma surrounding mental health with a series of livestreamed conversations which can be found on Lauv's YouTube Channel. On October 13, 2020, Lauv released the single "Fake" with Conan Gray, a song where both Gray and Leff take swipes at fake people who pretend to be their friends although they betray and lie about them behind their backs. On November 13, 2020, he was featured on "Stop Crying Your Heart Out" as part of the BBC Radio 2's Allstars' BBC Children in Need 2020 charity single in the United Kingdom. The single debuted at number seven on the UK Singles Chart on November 20, 2020 – for the week ending date November 26, 2020 – and number one on both the UK Singles Sales Chart and the UK Singles Download Chart. On December 31, 2020, Lauv dropped the surprise single "2021" as a New Year's Eve special. "2021" is a song that looks to the incoming year to be brighter and more hopeful than the current year the world had to deal with. Overall, the song welcomes the new year.

=== 2021–2022: All 4 Nothing and tour ===
On July 27, 2021, American DJ DallasK announced a new single "Try Again", featuring Lauv. The song was released July 30.

On January 18, 2022, Lauv announced his second studio album is "done", with the lead single titled "26" released on January 28. Around this time, it was revealed in a Billboard article that Lauv finalized a distribution deal with Virgin Music Label & Artist Services.

On April 8, 2022, Lauv released the second single from his second album, titled "All 4 Nothing (I'm So in Love)" along with a music video. The previous day, his Spotify About description had been edited with information regarding the title of his second album All 4 Nothing. The album was released on August 5 along with the music video for the single "Stranger"; to support the album, Lauv embarked on a North American tour, stopping at many cities in both Canada and the US.

=== 2023–present: In Between Albums tour and standalone singles ===
On April 27, Lauv announced Asia dates for his "in between albums tour" where he played in Japan, Hong Kong, Thailand, South Korea, Taiwan, Indonesia, Singapore, the Philippines and mainland China, followed by Europe/UK & Oceania dates on July 10.

In June 2023, Lauv released "Steal the Show", for the Pixar Animation Studios film Elemental. At the same time, he co-wrote Mimi Webb's song "This Moment" for the animated teen comedy film Ruby Gillman, Teenage Kraken.

On August 4, 2023, Lauv released his new single "Love U Like That".

In 2024, Lauv released several singles, including "Potential" on April 24, and "Cozy," a collaboration with Jeremy Zucker and Alexander 23, on May 22. On September 12, 2024, Lauv released another single, “First Heartbreak” under his new partnership with AWAL.

In 2025, Lauv began his "I Love You, Mean It Tour" across Asia, with performances in Kaohsiung (Taiwan), Daegu (South Korea), and Nanjing (China). On July 18, 2025, he released a new single, "Combust.".

Lauv release Mad a pop dance collaboration with the Dutch DJ and record producer Martin Garrix. It was released on May 27, 2025. The track premiered in March 2025 during Garrix's set at Ultra Music Festival, where Lauv joined him on stage. In the Netherlands, "Mad" debuted at number 38 on the Dutch Top 40 and later peaked at number 18, spending three weeks at its peak. It remained on the chart for a total of 22 weeks, also peaked at number 1 on US Dance Radio. The song also appeared on two national charts overall.

On September 5, 2025, Lauv was part of the Coke Studio Season 9: LIVE’ joint concert which featured Philippine pop groups such as Bini and Alamat.

== Personal life ==
Lauv resides in Los Angeles, California. Leff dated pop musician Julia Michaels for 10 months in 2018, and they broke up in the end of that year. In 2020, he entered in a relationship with fellow singer-songwriter Sophie Cates. They have since broken up.

Leff has publicly discusssed his mental health several times throughout his career. Because of his experiences, Leff is known for donating proceeds from songs to mental health organizations in an effort to erase stigma surrounding mental health. Microsoft and Leff teamed up to release "My Blue Thoughts", a place for people struggling to share what they were going through and to let go of something weighing them down.

His mother and his maternal grandparents are Latvian and Leff has frequently visited Latvia to visit relatives and spend summers in his grandfather's cottage in the seaside city of Jūrmala.

In June 2023, Lauv discussed his sexual orientation in a TikTok post with a video captioned "when ur dating a girl but ur also a lil bit into men." In an interview that August with Out, he clarified his earlier comments on his sexuality, saying that "I don't really have any particular answers yet, other than it's something that I'm exploring in my music and exploring in my mind, and I'm going to be exploring in my life."

== Discography ==
- How I'm Feeling (2020)
- All 4 Nothing (2022)

== Awards and nominations ==
| Year | Award | Category | Work | Result | Ref. |
|---|---|---|---|---|---|
| 2018 | Teen Choice Awards | Choice Breakout Artist | Himself | Nominated | |
| 2018 | Radio Disney Music Awards | Best New Artist | Himself | Nominated | |
| 2018 | Radio Disney Music Awards | Best Crush Song | "I Like Me Better" | Nominated | |
| 2018 | iHeartRadio Titanium Award | 1 Billion Total Audience Spins on iHeartRadio Stations | "I Like Me Better" | Won | |
| 2019 | iHeartRadio Music Awards | Best New Pop Artist | Himself | Nominated | |
| 2019 | MTV Video Music Awards | Push Artist of the Year | Himself | Nominated | |
| 2019 | MTV Europe Music Awards | Best Push | Himself | Nominated | |
| 2019 | Melon Music Awards | Best Pop Award | I'm So Tired ... (with Troye Sivan) | Nominated | |
| 2020 | Joox Thailand Music Awards | International Artist of the Year | Himself | Nominated | |
| 2020 | AIM Independent Music Awards | Best Independent Track in Association With Facebook | "Modern Loneliness" | Nominated | |
| 2020 | Global Awards | Rising Star | Himself | Nominated | |
| 2021 | AIM Independent Music Awards | Most New Independent Artist | Himself | Won | |
