= DallasK =

American DJ

- Born: Dallas James Koehlke; 1993 (age 32–33)
- Origin: Los Angeles, California, U.S.
- Genres: EDM; Dutch house; electro house; big room house; bass house
- Occupations: Disc jockey; record producer
- Instruments: Piano; guitar; synthesizer
- Years active: 2010–present
- Label: Amigo

Dallas James Koehlke (born 1993), better known by his stage name DallasK, is an American DJ, record producer, and singer based in Los Angeles. Active since 2010, he co-wrote and produced Fifth Harmony's 2016 single "Work From Home," as well as their singles "Down" and "He Like That..." off of their self titled album. In addition, Koehlke co-wrote and co-produced Lauv's singles "Sad Forever" and "Breathe." He has also produced for Chromeo, Krewella, KSHMR, Terror Jr, Miquela, Joel Deleōn, Key and Stray Kids. He is also known for his collaborations with Hardwell and Tiësto: "Area 51" and "Show Me" are ranked first and third in the Top 100 on the platform Beatport. He is signed to Amigo Records and has had past releases with Musical Freedom, Revealed Recordings and Ultra Music.

== Discography ==
=== Charting singles ===
List of charting singles
Year	Title	Peak chart positions				Album
Year	Title	US Dance	BEL (Fl) Dance	BEL (Wa) Dance	NZ Hot	Album
2014	"Burn" (with Kshmr)	—	11	9	—	Non-album singles
2018	"All My Life"	39	—	—	—	Non-album singles
2021	"Try Again" (featuring Lauv)	—	—	—	27	Non-album singles
2023	"This Moment"	-	-	-	-	Non-album singles
"—" denotes a recording that did not chart or was not released in that territory.

=== Singles ===
- 2011: Hyphy [Funkk Sound Recordings]
- 2011: Crush [Burn The Fire]
- 2011: Front / Back [Bazooka Records]
- 2011: Jupiter [Bazooka Records]
- 2012: Run [Bazooka Records]
- 2013: Vice [Kindergarten Recordings]
- 2013: Heaven
- 2013: Alienz [Kindergarten Recordings]
- 2014: Blackmail (with Henry Fong) [Ultra]
- 2014: Orion [Ultra]
- 2014: Burn (with KSHMR) [Revealed Recordings]
- 2014: Burn (Let Your Mind Go) (with KSHMR featuring Luciana) [Spinnin' Records]
- 2015: Superfuture
- 2015: Area51 (with Hardwell) [Revealed Recordings]
- 2015: Crash 2.0 (Adventure Club vs Dallask) [BMG Rights Management US]
- 2015: Show Me (with Tiësto) [Musical Freedom]
- 2015: Retrograde [Revealed Recordings]
- 2015: Kaya [Revealed Recordings]
- 2016: Work from Home (Fifth Harmony featuring Ty Dolla $ign) (as a songwriter and producer) [Epic and Syco Records]
- 2016: Powertrip [Revealed Recordings]
- 2016: Your Love (with Tiësto) [Musical Freedom]
- 2017: Down (featuring Gucci Mane) [Epic and Syco Records]
- 2018: All My Life [Amigo Records and If Only]
- 2018: Self Control [Amigo Records and If Only]
- 2018: Recover [Amigo Records and If Only]
- 2018: Looking for Your Love [Amigo Records and If Only]
- 2019: Sometimes (with Nicky Romero featuring XYLO) [Amigo Records and If Only]
- 2019: I Know [Musical Freedom]
- 2020: I Know (Club Mix) [Musical Freedom]
- 2021: Try Again (featuring Lauv) [Astralwerks/Proximity]
- 2022: Time (with Dark Heart) [Musical Freedom]
- 2022: Loop (with Martin Garrix featuring Sasha Alex Sloan) [Astralwerks/STMPD RCRDS]
- 2022: Exceso (featuring Gale) [Astralwerks/Proximity]

=== Remixes ===
- 2011: Meaux Green - Poppin' Bubbly (DallasK Remix) [Funkk Sound Recordings]
- 2011: Spencer & Hill - One Touch Away (DallasK Remix) [Bazooka Records]
- 2012: Skrillex - Weekends (DallasK Dubstep Remix) [Big Beat]
- 2013: T.I., Pharrell, Robin Thicke - Blurred Lines (DallasK Remix) [Star Trak, LLC]
- 2013: Ghost Beach - Miracle (DallasK Remix) [Nettwerk]
- 2013: Botnek - Through the Night (DallasK Remix) [Dim Mak Records]
- 2014: Henry Fong - Stand Up (DallasK Remix) [OWSLA]
- 2014: A-Trak, Andrew Wyatt - Push (DallasK Remix) [Fool's Gold Records]
- 2015: Henry Fong - Stand Up (Halftime) (DallasK Remix) [OWSLA]
- 2015: MGMT - Electric Feel (DallasK Remix) [Columbia (Sony)]
- 2015: The Chainsmokers - Good Intentions (DallasK Remix) [Disruptor Records - Sony Music Entertainment]
- 2015: Galantis - In My Head (DallasK Remix) [Big Beat Records]
- 2015: Hardwell and DallasK - Area 51 (DallasK Rework) [Revealed Recs]
- 2016: Tommy Trash - Luv U Giv (DallasK Remix) [Fool's Gold Records]
- 2016: Martin Garrix and Bebe Rexha - "In The Name Of Love" (DallasK Remix) [STMPD RCRDS]
- 2018: Tritonal featuring Lourdiz - "Love U Right" (DallasK Remix) [Enhanced Music]
- 2018: Justin Caruso featuring Jake Miller - "Don't Know You" (DallasK Remix) [Big Beat Records]
- 2019: ITZY - "Dalla Dalla" (달라달라) (DallasK Remix) [JYP Entertainment]
- 2019: Ashley O - "On a Roll" (DallasK Remix) [RCA Records / Null Corp II]
- 2021: Tesher and Jason Derulo - "Jalebi Baby" (DallasK Remix) [Capitol Records]
- 2023: Kim Petras and Nicki Minaj - "Alone" (DallasK Remix) [Amigo Records]
