= LANY discography =

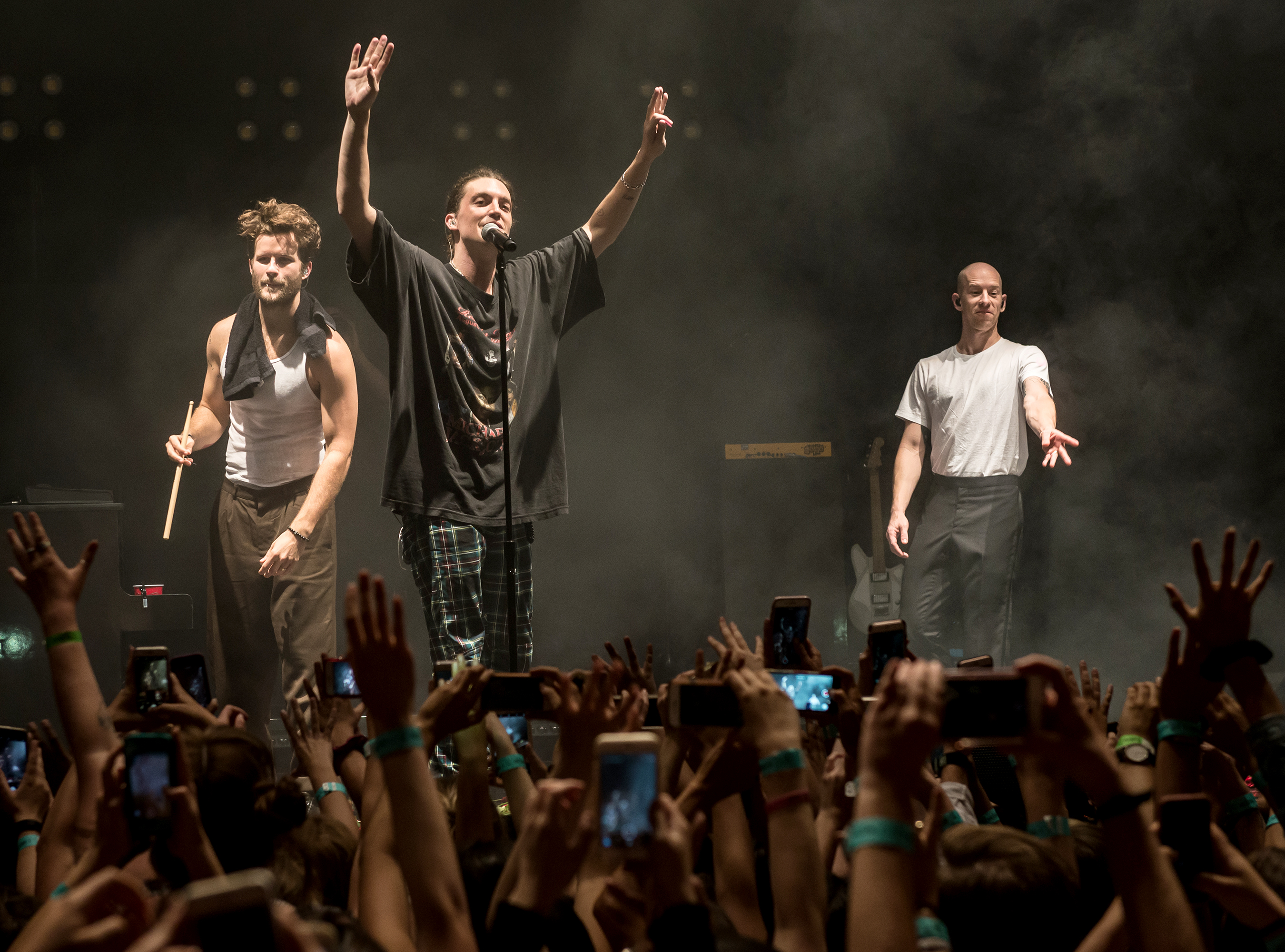
- LANY performing at the Wiltern in Los Angeles, California on November 3, 2017
- Studio albums: 6
- EPs: 4
- Singles: 34
- Music videos: 26
- Promotional singles: 5

American pop rock band LANY has released six studio albums, four extended plays (EPs), thirty-four singles, five promotional singles and twenty-six music videos.

The band released their first four albums through Polydor and Interscope Records. These are LANY (2017), Malibu Nights (2018), Mama's Boy (2020), and Gg bb xx (2021). Some of their most successful singles include the RIAA-certified "ILYSB" (2015), "Super Far" (2017), "Malibu Nights" (2018), the collaboration with Julia Michaels called "Okay" (2019), and Mean It with Lauv also from 2019. In September 2023, they released their fifth studio album A Beautiful Blur. It was their first album under their own label Sunset Records and distributed through Virgin Music Group after leaving Polydor and Interscope. On July 30, 2025, the band announced their sixth studio album Soft, which was released on October 10, 2025.

== Studio albums ==
LANY
- Released: June 30, 2017 (US)
- Label: Polydor
- Formats: CD, LP, cassette, digital download, streaming

No.	Title	Length
1.	"Dumb Stuff"	2:32
2.	"The Breakup"	3:59
3.	"Super Far"	3:23
4.	"Overtime"	3:34
5.	"Flowers on the Floor"	4:20
6.	"Parents"	1:18
7.	"ILYSB" (Stripped)	3:31
8.	"13"	3:54
9.	"Hericane"	5:46
10.	"Hurts"	3:36
11.	"Good Girls"	4:09
12.	"Pancakes"	3:52
13.	"Tampa"	3:41
14.	"Purple Teeth"	3:53
15.	"So, Soo Pretty"	1:42
16.	"It Was Love"	3:48
Total length:		56:50

Malibu Nights
- Released: October 5, 2018 (US)
- Label: Side Street, Polydor
- Formats: CD, LP, cassette, digital download, streaming

No.	Title	Length
1.	"Thick and Thin"	3:32
2.	"Taking Me Back"	3:14
3.	"If You See Her"	3:02
4.	"I Don’t Wanna Love You Anymore"	3:21
5.	"Let Me Know"	4:36
6.	"Run"	3:48
7.	"Valentine’s Day"	3:37
8.	"Thru These Tears"	3:24
9.	"Malibu Nights"	4:46
Total length:		33:20

Mama’s Boy
- Released: October 2, 2020 (US)
- Label: Side Street, Polydor
- Formats: CD, LP, cassette, digital download, streaming

No.	Title	Length
1.	"you!"	4:34
2.	"cowboy in LA"	3:33
3.	"heart won't let me"	3:19
4.	"if this is the last time"	3:23
5.	"i still talk to jesus"	4:16
6.	"paper"	4:05
7.	"good guys"	3:45
8.	"sharing you"	3:29
9.	"bad news"	3:31
10.	"when you're drunk"	3:32
11.	"anything 4 u"	3:15
12.	"sad"	3:20
13.	"(what i wish just one person would say to me)"	3:35
14.	"nobody else"	3:18
15.	"heart won't let me (stripped)" (deluxe edition bonus track)	3:18
16.	"sad (stripped)" (deluxe edition bonus track)	2:56
17.	"i still talk to jesus (live)" (deluxe edition bonus track)	4:51
18.	"ILYSB (Stripped)" (Japanese edition bonus track)	3:18
Total length:		standard: approx. 50:48; deluxe: approx. 1:01:52; Japanese edition CD version

gg bb xx
- Released: September 3, 2021 (US)
- Label: Side Street, Polydor
- Formats: CD, LP, cassette, digital download, streaming

No.	Title	Length
1.	"get away"	3:05
2.	"up to me"	2:48
3.	"never mind, let's break up"	2:42
4.	"dna"	2:57
5.	"roll over, baby"	3:24
6.	"live it down"	3:19
7.	"dancing in the kitchen"	3:29
8.	"ex i never had"	3:21
9.	"somewhere"	3:36
10.	"care less"	3:18
11.	"'til i don't"	2:59
12.	"one minute left to live"	3:13
13.	"i die first" (deluxe edition bonus track)	2:56
14.	"remember that" (deluxe edition bonus track)	3:22
15.	"i didn't lie" (deluxe edition bonus track)	2:54
16.	"they don’t make ’em like you anymore" (deluxe edition bonus track)	2:35
17.	"the older you get, the less you cry" (deluxe edition bonus track)	3:22
18.	"dna [demo]" (deluxe edition bonus track)	2:35
19.	"Stupid Feelings" (deluxe edition bonus track; with 220 Kid)	2:47
20.	"i quit drinking" (deluxe edition bonus track; with Kelsea Ballerini)	2:51
Total length:		38:13 (standard); 60:01 (deluxe)

A Beautiful Blur (Note: The album was originally announced as "I Really Really Hope So", and some physical copies still carry the original name.)
- Released: September 29, 2023 (US)
- Label: Sunset Garden, Virgin
- Formats: CD, LP, cassette, digital download, streaming

No.	Title	Length
1.	"XXL"	3:26
2.	"Out of My League"	3:26
3.	"Sugar & Cinnamon"	3:36
4.	"I Pray"	3:02
5.	"Home Is Where the Hurt Is"	4:00
6.	"It Even Rains In LA"	3:35
7.	"Heartbreak Can Wait"	3:21
8.	"(Saturday Night) 3:22 A.M."	4:22
9.	"Love at First Fight"	3:12
10.	"Congrats"	3:37
11.	"’Cause You Have To"	4:10
12.	"Alonica"	3:58
13.	"No"	3:47
Total length:		47:37

Soft
- Released: October 10, 2025 (US)
- Label: Sunset Garden, Virgin
- Formats: CD, LP, cassette, digital download, streaming

No.	Title	Length
1.	"Soft"	3:26
2.	"Why"	3:18
3.	"Know You Naked"	3:40
4.	"Stuck"	3:10
5.	"Sound of Rain"	3:30
6.	"Act My Age"	3:45
7.	"Good Parts"	3:24
8.	"Make Me Forget"	3:42
9.	"Destiny"	3:30
10.	"Last Forever"	3:50
Total length:		34:01

== Extended plays ==
Title	Details
Acronyms	Released: 2014; Label: Self-released; Format: Digital download; Track listing: 1. "(OMG)"; 2. "ILYSB"; 3. "BRB"
I Loved You	Released: June 9, 2015; Label: Polydor; Format: Digital download, 12"; Track listing: 1. "4ever!"; 2. "Youarefire"; 3. "Someone Else"; 4. "I Don't Care"; 5. "Bad, Bad, Bad" (Matt DiMona Remix)
Make Out	Released: December 11, 2015; Label: Polydor; Format: Digital download, 12"; Track listing: 1. "ILYSB"; 2. "Walk Away"; 3. "Bad, Bad, Bad"; 4. "Made in Hollywood"; 5. "BRB; Kiss"; 6. "ILYSB" (Stripped)
Kinda	Released: June 24, 2016; Label: Polydor; Format: Digital download, 12"; Track listing: 1. "Like You Lots"; 2. "Yea, Babe, No Way"; 3. "Pink Skies"; 4. "Current Location"; 5. "Quit"; 6. "Where the Hell Are My Friends"

== Singles ==
Title	Year	Certifications	Album
"Hot Lights" / "Walk Away"	2014		Make Out
"Made in Hollywood"	2014		Make Out
"Bad, Bad, Bad"	2014		Make Out
"ILYSB"	2015	RIAA: Platinum; ARIA: Gold; BPI: Silver; MC: Gold; RMNZ: Gold	Make Out
"Where the Hell Are My Friends"	2016		Kinda
"Yea, Babe, No Way"	2016		Kinda
"Good Girls"	2016		Kinda
"It Was Love"	2017		LANY
"The Breakup"	2017		LANY
"13"	2017		LANY
"Super Far"	2017	RIAA: Gold; RMNZ: Gold	LANY
"Thru These Tears"	2018		Malibu Nights
"Malibu Nights"	2018	RIAA: Gold; RMNZ: Gold	Malibu Nights
"I Don't Wanna Love You Anymore"	2018		Malibu Nights
"Thick and Thin"	2018		Malibu Nights
"If You See Her"	2018		Malibu Nights
"Okay" (with Julia Michaels)	2019		Non-album single
"Mean It" (with Lauv)	2019	RIAA: Gold; ARIA: Gold; RMNZ: Gold	How I'm Feeling
"Good Guys"	2020		Mama's Boy
"If This Is the Last Time"	2020	RMNZ: Gold	Mama's Boy
"You!"	2020		Mama's Boy
"Cowboy in LA"	2020		Mama's Boy
"I Quit Drinking" (with Kelsea Ballerini)	2021	RIAA: Platinum; ARIA: Gold; MC: Platinum	Non-album single
"Dancing in the Kitchen"	2021		gg bb xx
"Stupid Feelings" (with 220 Kid)	2021		gg bb xx
"Never Mind, Let's Break Up"	2021		gg bb xx
"Roll Over Baby"	2021		gg bb xx
"Congrats"	2022		A Beautiful Blur
"Love at First Fight"	2023		A Beautiful Blur
"Alonica"	2023		A Beautiful Blur
"XXL"	2023		A Beautiful Blur
"Home Is Where the Hurt Is"	2023		A Beautiful Blur
"Know You Naked"	2025		Soft

=== Promotional singles ===
Title	Year	Album
"Super Far" / "Sign of the Times"	2017	Spotify Singles
"DNA [Demo]" / "Up to Me"	2021	Up to Me/DNA [Demo]
"Dancing in the Kitchen"	2021	Dancing in the Kitchen
