= Paul Klein (musician) =

American musician (born 1988)

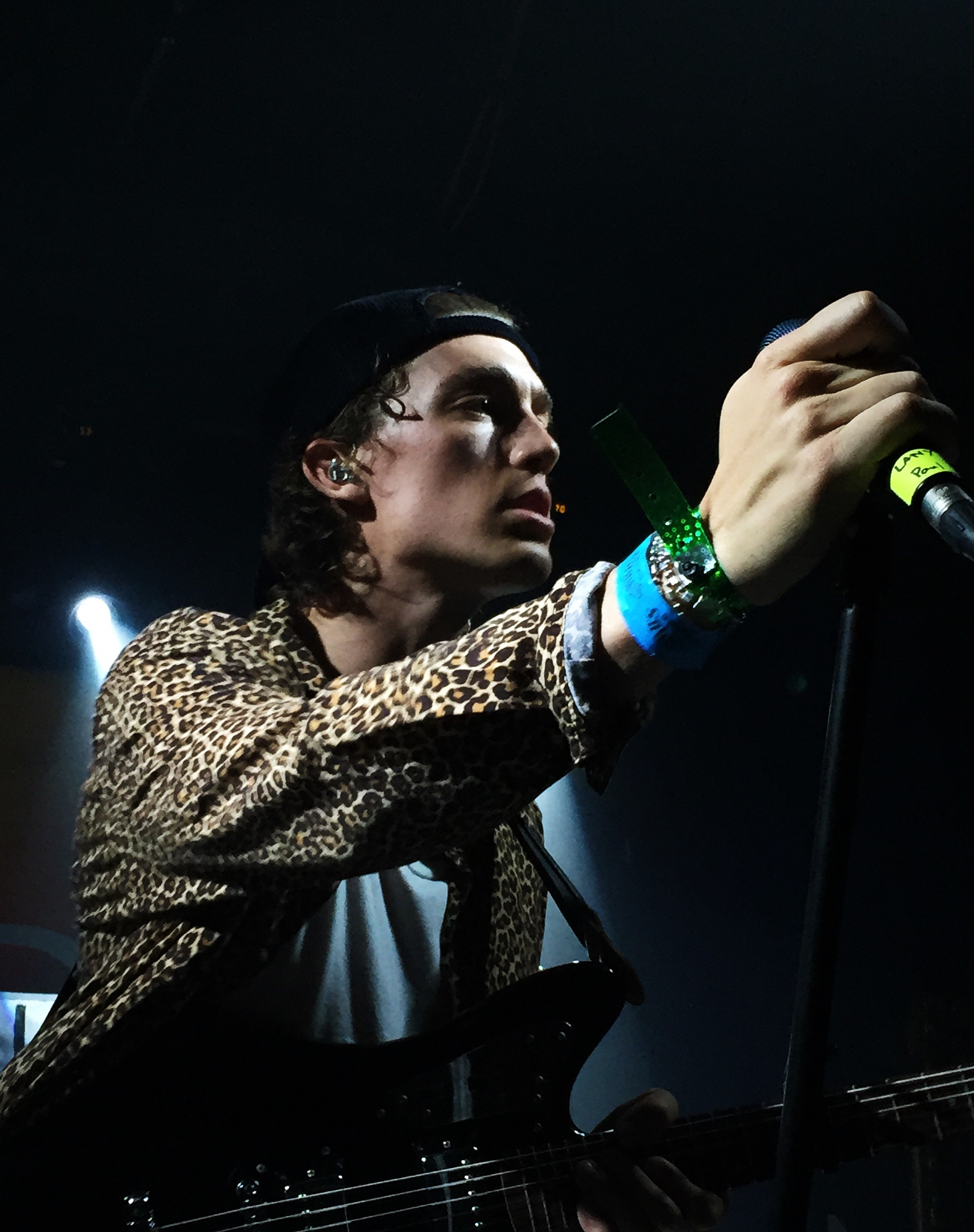
- Klein in 2015
- Born: Paul Jason Klein; April 30, 1988 (age 38); Tulsa, Oklahoma, U.S.
- Occupations: Musician; record producer; former model
- Years active: 2014–present
- Musical career
- Origin: Los Angeles, California
- Genres: Alternative pop; synth-pop; indie pop; dream pop; pop rock
- Instruments: Vocals; piano; guitar; keyboards
- Labels: Polydor; Interscope; Side Street; For the World; Sunset Garden; Virgin
- Member of: LANY
- Website: pauljasonklein.com

Paul Jason Klein (born April 30, 1988) is an American musician and record producer, who is the lead vocalist of the pop rock band LANY. He known for his introspective lyricism, highly visual aesthetic that blends music and fashion, and influence on indie pop music.

Born in Tulsa, Oklahoma and later moved in Los Angeles. Klein formed LANY in 2014 with Jake Goss and Les Priest after meeting them at Belmont University in Nashville. After signing with Polydor and Interscope Records, the band released sixth studio albums, their self-titled debut album (2017), Malibu Nights (2018), Mama's Boy (2020), and Gg bb xx (2021). They followed this with A Beautiful Blur (2023), their first album released on their own imprint Sunset Records, distributed via Virgin Music Group, and most recently released Soft (2025). The band achieved commercial success with singles including the Recording Industry Association of America (RIAA) certified "ILYSB" (2015), "Super Far" (2017), "Malibu Nights" (2018), the Julia Michaels collaboration "Okay" (2019), and "Mean It" (2019) with Lauv. Klein was featured on Hillsong Young & Free musician Aodhán King's song "Thank You So Much Jesus" (2024), marking his first collaboration outside of his band.

Beyond his roles as songwriter and performer, Klein is also LANY's creative director. He helps create the band's merchandise, album artwork, and songs, which focus on themes of relationships, heartbreak, self-discovery, and his own experiences. He has been described as a "relentlessly authentic" by People, "the artistic force behind for his band," by GQ, and "dramatic meltdowns" by CNN.

== Life and career ==
=== Early life and formation of LANY ===
Paul Jason Klein was born and raised in Tulsa, Oklahoma. He comes from a Christian background and was previously a worship leader. His mother enrolled him in classical piano lessons at the age of five, and he trained in classical piano for 13 years. Klein studied at Belmont University in Nashville, where he met his future bandmates. They were initially friends before forming the band. After finishing high school, he moved to Los Angeles to pursue a career in music.

Klein first met Jake Goss in Nashville, but the band LANY did not officially form until Klein relocated to Los Angeles. He has stated that his time in Nashville had come to an end and was no longer serving his creative purpose, and that LANY was not yet a concept when he moved to Los Angeles. In 2014, Klein officially formed LANY in Los Angeles with Goss and Les Priest. The band initially shared their music on SoundCloud, with early tracks such as "ILYSB" and part of their debut EP Acronyms. The band started performing live shows around California and built a loyal fanbase.

=== 2017–2019: Rise to fame, Debut album and Malibu Nights ===
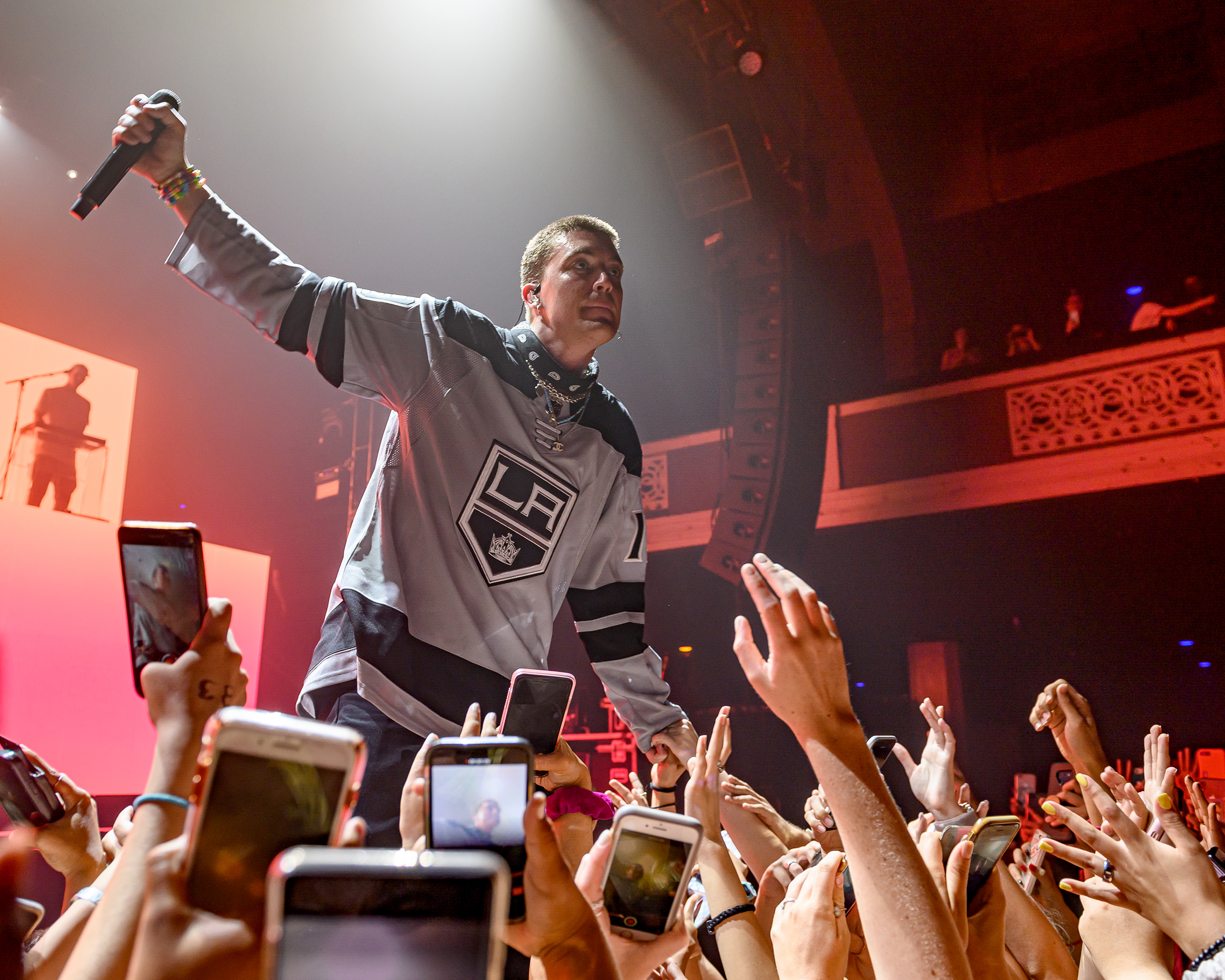
Klein performing at the Shrine Expo Hall in Los Angeles

The band released their self-titled debut album in 2017. Songs he wrote like "ILYSB" and "The Breakup" helped the band gain wider recognition. Some reviews praised the album and described it as "relatable", with a synth‑pop sound. For example, one review called the record "romantic, intimate and sometimes completely and utterly heartbroken", praising its "lush instrumentals and transparent lyricism."

In 2018, the band released Malibu Nights, inspired by Klein's breakup with Dua Lipa. The album was noted for its emotional and heartbreaking theme, especially the single "Thru These Tears", and performed live on The Late Late Show with James Corden on August 7, 2018. Erica Gonzales of Harper's Bazaar wrote "Thru These Tears" has the band's signature alternative-meets-synth-pop sound, coupled with Klein's ambient vocals and tweet-worthy lyrics. Klein dedicated himself fully to the writing process, working continuously for around 50 days to stay occupied during the period following his breakup. He explained that he spent "every single day" in the studio to keep his mind focused on creating.

In 2019, the band added an additional show to the Malibu Nights Tour in Manila, marking the band's second major solo concert in the Philippines. They performed at the SM Mall of Asia Arena. In the same year, Klein, met the global K-pop girl group Blackpink. During the group's performance at the Forum in Los Angeles in 2022, member Rosé was also able to meet Klein. In November, the band collaborated with singer-songwriter Lauv on the song "Mean It". The lyrics reflect personal experiences and emotions shared by both Lauv and Klein.

=== 2020–2022: Mama's Boy and Gg bb xx ===
In 2020, the band released their third album Mama's Boy, exploring personal themes such as identity, growth, and relationships. The album combined synth-pop and R&B influences. Klein contrasted the record with its predecessor, explaining Malibu Nights had been a breakup record shaped by a very public chapter of his life, Mama's Boy came from a different place. He said he could have avoided that earlier narrative or embraced it, and chose to be open about it. By contrast, he described Mama's Boy as a more inward-looking project, one built on introspection and self-reflection, with many songs written as conversations with himself rather than directed toward someone else.

In an interview with Bandwagon, Klein said:

There’s so much life and so much flavour to the album... it's just a really positive album. There's not a lot of sad songs on it, I think there’s been enough sadness this year. It's just a really wholesome, positive-like good vibes type of album that I think will get better and better with each listen.

In 2021, the band released the song "I Quit Drinking" in collaboration with singer Kelsei Ballerini. The track was co-written by Ballerini, Klein, and Nicolle Galyon, and produced by country musicians Jimmy Robbins and Noah Conrad. In September, the band released their fourth album Gg bb xx. Looking back on the project, Klein said the album was heavily influenced by the circumstances of the COVID-19 pandemic, noting that they might not have created or released it if that period had not happened.

In 2022, the band announced they would be returning to Manila in November as part of their Asia tour, marking their first visit to the continent in three years. The concert was originally scheduled from November 11 to 13, but was later extended to five days, running until November 16.

=== 2023–present: Collaboration, A Beautiful Blur and Soft ===
In 2023, the band released their fifth album A Beautiful Blur. Klein explained that he focused on writing lyrics and melodies first, leaving production for later. He wrote 27 songs for the album, which he and Jake Goss reviewed together with their producer to select the final tracks, ensuring all material met their approval before release.

In 2024, Klein was featured on "Thank You So Much Jesus" alongside Hillsong Young & Free musician Aodhán King.

In 2025, the band announced their sixth studio album Soft with the lead single "know you naked" released on August 1. A few days later, the band confirmed the album would feature ten tracks and revealed the cover art, which depicts Klein holding a lamb across his chest.

== Artistry ==
=== Musical styles and influences ===
"He writes songs about being in love and getting his heart broken, but he now gets the inspiration from ex-girlfriends with their own big name in the business and plays the lyrics and melodies he composes about the memories he shares with them in front of thousands of screaming fans."

— Statement from CNN on Klein's songwriting inspiration, 2019

Klein's songwriting combines personal themes with pop production, often focusing on heartbreak, relationships, and self-discovery. In addition to writing and performing songs, he has acted as the band's main creative director, handling LANY's merchandise and album artwork. He draws inspiration from artists such as Coldplay, John Mayer, and Imogen Heap. Critics note his soft, emotive voice, which complements LANY's layered synth and pop sound. In an interview with Esquire Magazine, Klein has cited Ed Sheeran and Taylor Swift as his dream collaborators, and has also expressed admiration for Coldplay's Chris Martin, calling him "one of the greatest frontmen alive" and someone he hopes to learn from.

=== Fashion ===
In fashion, Klein has stated that he greatly admires American designer Ralph Lauren, noting his enduring influence, classic aesthetic, and the way his work "gets better with age and wear." Village Pipol described Klein as having a "good boy" aesthetic. His fashion style is characterized by a blend of streetwear, vintage, and edgy pieces, which he has translated into a capsule collection with Elwood Clothing. He has said that clothing is his main way of expressing himself. His influence on fans has grown, reflecting his role in music and fashion. Klein has also stated that he feels he is better at wearing clothes than making music, which motivates him to continue challenging himself creatively in both areas. He also became a muse for the Italian fashion label Marni. In December 2021, he attended Marni's Spring 2022 show in Milan for his first experience at Milan Fashion Week, after meeting the brand's creative director Francesco Risso for a fitting.

== Public image ==
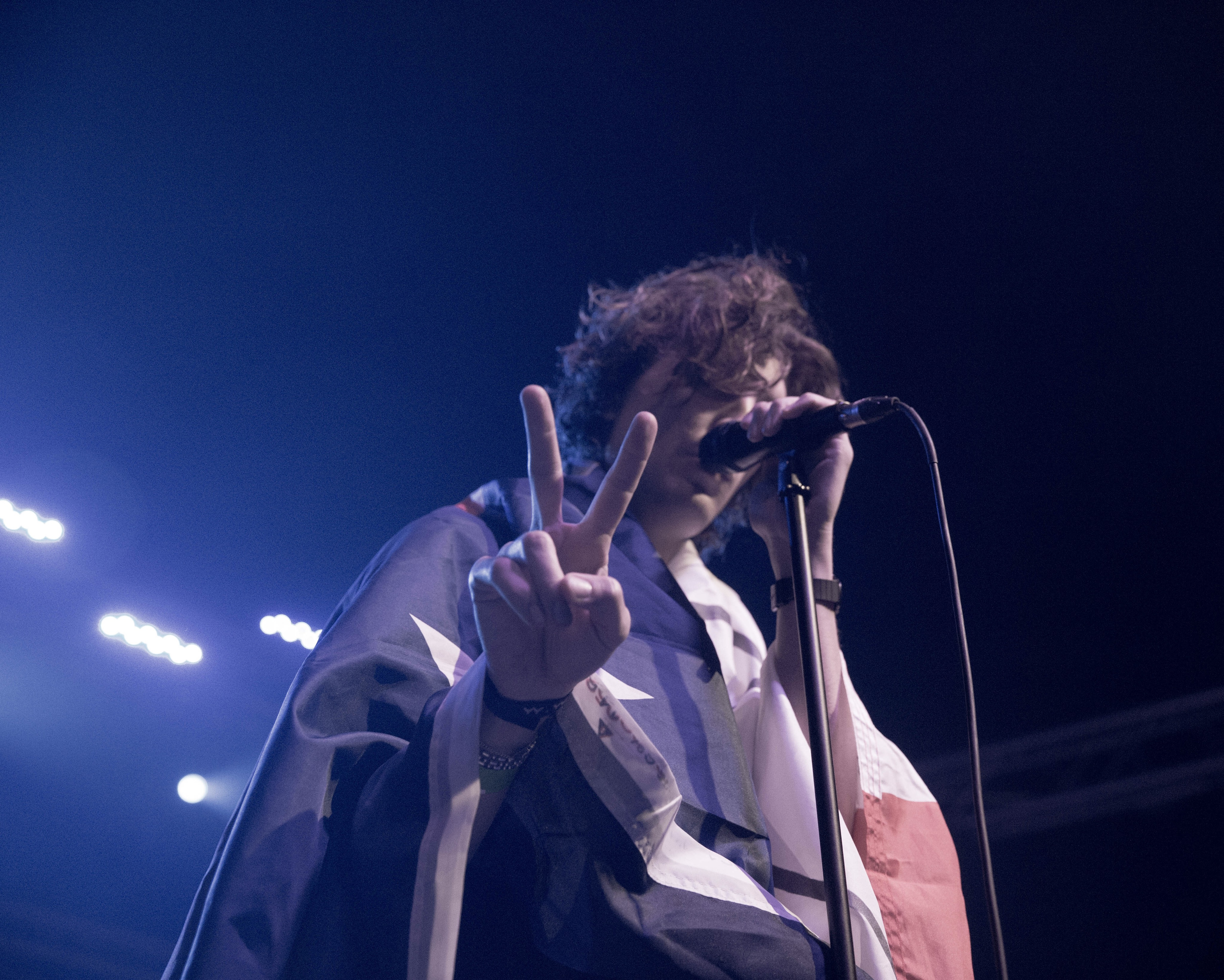
Klein in Dallas, Texas in 2015

Klein has been described as authentic and self-aware. He has said that honesty is the core of his music. In an interview with People, Klein told that he "sleeps better at night just telling the truth", explaining that he draws on real experiences for his songs instead of using a made-up persona.

Even as the band grew, Klein has remained actively involved in fan communication, managing, writing newsletters, and engaging with fans as part of a community rather than treating them simply as consumers. He added, that he maintains direct control over the band's social media and communication channels, noting that he "still run[s] our Twitter and our Instagram…from [his] phone." Klein adds that he and the band give "more than 100 percent in every show", noting that he tries to engage with the crowd and create a physical, intimate connection with as many audience members as possible.

== Personal life ==
Klein had a relationship with singer Dua Lipa in 2017 until 2018, and their breakup later inspired the writing of LANY's second album Malibu Nights.

In 2024, Klein was in a traffic accident while riding his Vespa in Los Angeles. He said that a car turning left at an intersection hit him, throwing him onto the car's windshield. He suffered several injuries, including fractures to his face and shin, a torn calf, and a badly damaged shoulder.

== Discography ==
=== With LANY ===
- LANY (2017)
- Malibu Nights (2018)
- Mama's Boy (2020)
- gg bb xx (2021)
- A Beautiful Blur (2023)
- Soft (2025)

=== Other works and collaborations ===
- Thank You So Much Jesus (2024) with Aodhán King
