= Mama's Boy (album) =

Mama’s Boy

Studio album by LANY
- Released: October 2, 2020
- Recorded: 2019–2020
- Genre: Alternative pop; dream pop; pop rock; alternative rock
- Length: 50:48
- Label: Side Street; Polydor
- Producer: Chad Copelin; Tyler Johnson; King Henry; LANY

LANY chronology
Malibu Nights (2018)	Mama’s Boy (2020)	gg bb xx (2021)

Singles from Mama’s Boy
- 1. "Good Guys" Released: May 13, 2020; 2. "If This Is The Last Time" Released: July 1, 2020; 3. "You!" Released: August 14, 2020; 4. "Cowboy in LA" Released: September 16, 2020

Mama's Boy is the third studio album by American indie pop band LANY, released on October 2, 2020, through Polydor Records.

== Background and composition ==
This is us knowing exactly who we are and embracing ourselves fully for the first time as a band, and we've done our best to make album [three] as perfect as possible... like a freshly-mowed yard.

—LANY on social media discussing the album's title

After the release of their first two albums, LANY and Malibu Nights, the band took part in two collaborations: one with Julia Michaels on the song "Okay" and another with Lauv on the song "Mean It". Both collaborations became the band's first ever charted releases. They also covered the song "Sign of the Times" by Harry Styles in an earlier live session for Spotify.

During that time, they had grown good working partnerships with Mike Crossey and Sasha Sloan who co-wrote most of the material for the album, as well as a few on Malibu Nights. Paul Klein stated in an interview with Front Row Live, "I've only co-written a couple time before, but nothing like what I had done recently. And I did learn really quick and who I gelled with the most and what really seemed to work, what made me most comfortable. I know it sounds kinda silly, but I found writing with female songwriters a lot more comforting and made me feel way more safe. It reminded me of when you're a little kid and something goes wrong. Like who would you run to first: your mom." He also expressed how the more they talked before they started writing, the better the songs turned out. Jake Goss also added compliments about Crossey, stating "Before, it was so much fun. And this time around with Mike, he had a big studio. So we were able to test out what he had in his studio. It was fun messing around with layers and finding a perfect balance."

== Singles ==
On May 13, LANY released the album's lead single, "Good Guys". On July 1, their second single "If This Is the Last Time" was released. The album's third single, "You!", was released on August 13, 2020. The fourth single, "Cowboy in LA", was released on September 16, 2020.

== Track listing ==
No.	Title	Writer(s)	Producer(s)	Length
1.	"You!"	Paul Klein; King Henry; Sasha Alex Sloan	LANY; King Henry; Chad Copelin; Paul Meany^{[a]}	4:34
2.	"Cowboy in LA"	Klein; King Henry; Sloan	LANY; King Henry; Tyler Johnson	3:33
3.	"Heart Won't Let Me"	Klein; King Henry; Sloan	LANY; King Henry; Johnson	3:19
4.	"If This Is the Last Time"	Klein; Jake Goss; Les Priest; Jordan Reynolds; Sloan; Daniel Smyers	LANY; King Henry; Johnson	3:23
5.	"I Still Talk to Jesus"	Klein; Shane McAnally; Sloan	LANY; King Henry; Copelin	4:16
6.	"Paper"	Klein; King Henry; Sloan	LANY; King Henry	4:04
7.	"Good Guys"	Klein; Goss; Priest; King Henry; Ian Fitchuk; Sloan	LANY; King Henry; Johnson	3:44
8.	"Sharing You"	Klein; King Henry; Sloan	LANY; King Henry; Copelin	3:29
9.	"Bad News"	Klein; Noah Conrad; Sloan	LANY; King Henry; Copelin; Conrad	3:30
10.	"When You're Drunk"	Klein; Goss; Priest; McAnally; Sloan	LANY; King Henry; Copelin	3:32
11.	"Anything 4 U"	Klein; Goss; Priest; Nicolle Galyon	LANY; King Henry; Copelin	3:14
12.	"Sad"	Klein; Goss; Priest; Reynolds; Smyers	LANY; King Henry; Copelin	3:19
13.	"(What I Wish Just One Person Would Say to Me)"	Klein; Keshi	LANY; King Henry; Copelin	3:34
14.	"Nobody Else"	Klein; Dan Wilson	LANY; King Henry; Johnson	3:17
Total length:				50:48

Deluxe edition bonus tracks
No.	Title	Writer(s)	Producer(s)	Length
15.	"Heart Won't Let Me" (stripped)	Klein; King Henry; Sloan	LANY; Copelin	3:18
16.	"Sad" (stripped)	Goss; Klein; Priest; Reynolds; Smyers	LANY; Copelin	2:56
17.	"I Still Talk to Jesus" (live)	Klein; McAnally; Sloan	LANY	4:51
Total length:				62:01

Japanese edition bonus track
No.	Title	Length
15.	"ILYSB" (Stripped)	4:05
Total length:		55:03

Notes

- ^{^[a]} signifies an additional producer

== Personnel ==
Credits based on the deluxe edition track listing.

LANY

- Jake Goss - drums (tracks 1–16), background vocals (1, 3), percussion (15)
- Paul Klein - vocals (all tracks), piano (tracks 1, 2, 4–9, 11–17), background vocals (1), keyboards (3, 15), bass guitar (6)
- Les Priest - background vocals (tracks 1, 3), programming (15, 16)

Additional musicians

- Tyler Johnson – guitar (tracks 1–14); bass guitar, drum programming, keyboards (6)
- Chad Copelin – bass guitar (tracks 1, 5, 8–13, 15), organ (5, 8), synthesizer (5, 9, 10, 12), guitar (12, 15), keyboards (15, 16), programming (15)
- Heritage Hall Kids Choir – background vocals (track 1)
- Steve Day – background vocals (track 1)
- Paul Meany – background vocals (track 1)
- King Henry – guitar (tracks 2, 3), bass guitar (3, 7, 14), drums (14)
- Jon Joseph – bass guitar (tracks 2, 4)
- Sasha Alex Sloan – background vocals (tracks 3, 4, 7)
- Alex Mansour – cello (track 4)
- Nickie Conley – background vocals (track 5)
- Terry White – background vocals (track 5)
- Jason Eskridge – background vocals (track 5)
- Terrell Hunt – background vocals (track 5)
- Laura Cooksey – background vocals (track 5)
- Shelly Justice – background vocals (track 5)
- Lici Brown – background vocals (track 5)
- Debi Shelby – background vocals (track 5)
- Cameron Mitchell– keyboards (tracks 10, 15, 16), background vocals (10), programming (15, 16)
- Mitch Bell – guitar (track 12)
- Noah Conrad – flugelhorn (track 14)

Technical

- Robin Schmidt – mastering (tracks 1–14)
- Mike Crossey – mixing (tracks 1–16), vocal production (1–11, 13–15)
- Pedro Calloni – mixing, engineering (track 17)
- Chad Copelin – engineering, (tracks 1, 5, 8–13, 15, 16), vocal production (1, 9, 12)
- Nick Lobel – engineering (tracks 2–4, 6, 7, 14)
- Christian Theriot – engineering assistance (tracks 1, 5, 8, 11–13, 15, 16)
- Eric Eylands – engineering assistance (track 9)
- Jacob Johnston – engineering assistance (track 10)
- Justin Long – engineering assistance (track 10)
- Dylan Mellgren – engineering assistance (track 16)
- Cassidy Mandel – engineering assistance (track 16)

== Charts ==
Chart performance for Mama's Boy
Chart (2020)	Peak position
Australian Albums (ARIA)	67
Canadian Albums (Billboard)	67
Scottish Albums (OCC)	17
UK Albums (OCC)	21
US Billboard 200	7
US Top Alternative Albums (Billboard)	2
