= Thick and Thin (LANY song) =

Single by LANY

from the album Malibu Nights
- Written: January 4, 2018
- Released: September 12, 2018
- Genre: Synth-pop; funk-pop; dream pop; dance
- Length: 3:32
- Label: Side Street; Polydor
- Songwriters: Paul Klein; Jake Clifford Goss; Alexandra Artourovna Yatchenko; Nolan Lambroza
- Producers: LANY; Mike Crossey

LANY singles chronology
"I Don't Wanna Love You Anymore" (2018)	"Thick and Thin" (2018)	"If You See Her" (2018)

Music video
- "Thick and Thin" on YouTube

"Thick and Thin" is a song by American indie pop band LANY. It was released as the third single from their second studio album Malibu Nights (2018) on September 12, 2018.

== Background ==
"I walked into the room January 4th with a girl named Sasha and a guy named Nolan and wrote "Thick and Thin".

— Paul Klein,

The song served as the first opening track from their sophomore album, Malibu Nights (2018) and released as third single on September 12, 2018. "Thick and Thin" was teased at January 4, 2018 with a picture of a tweet from the band lead singer Paul Klein's Instagram, the same day where the band started writing songs for their sophomore album and the song.

== Composition ==
"Thick and Thin" is a song composed of synth-pop, funk-pop and dream pop, incorporates sounds of indie pop and dance. The song has a length of three minutes and thirty-two seconds and written by LANY members, Paul Jason Klein and Jake Clifford Goss, including Alexandra Yatchenko and Nolan Lambroza. "Thick and Thin" is set in the time signature of common time with a moderate tempo of 100 beats per minute and composed in F minor key.

Lyrically, the song is about heartbreak, betrayal and questioning the sincerity of promises in a relationship after it falls apart. It also captures confusion over something once solid can collapse over one mistake.

== Music video ==
The music video was released on February 4, 2019 and it was directed by Isaac Ravishankara. The music video shows the band lead vocalist Paul Klein riding on the trunk of the moving car drive by a mysterious woman while they cruises down the coastline of California next to idyllic sunset, while singing his heart out before parking next to the beach and watch her walking towards the ocean. The performance was done so beautifully in a single-take that 'Thick and Thin' became a sunset roadtrip song for many. It's such a simple music video, but the difficulty of sitting outside a moving car's trunk emphasised the song's message of the resilience and beauty in love and relationships.

== Track listing ==
TAT/IDWLYA/TTT
No.	Title	Length
1.	"Thick and Thin"	3:32
2.	"I Don't Wanna Love You Anymore"	3:21
3.	"Thru These Tears"	3:24

== Credits and personnel ==
Credits adapted from Tidal.

- LANY - Producer, programmer
- Paul Klein - Vocalist, songwriting, keyboard, guitar
- Jake Goss - Songwriting, percussions, drum kit
- Alexandra Yatchenko - Songwriting
- Nolan Lambroza - Songwriting
- Mike Crossey - Mixing engineer, programmer, producer
- Robin Schmidt - Mastering engineer
- Taylor Johnson - Guitar
- Stephen Sesso - Recording engineer

== Charts ==
Chart (2026)	Peak position
Philippines Hot 100 (Billboard Philippines)	56

== Release history ==
Region	Date	Format	Label	Ref.
Various	September 12, 2018	Digital download; Streaming	Side Street; Polydor	
