= Keshi (singer) =

American singer-songwriter (born 1994)

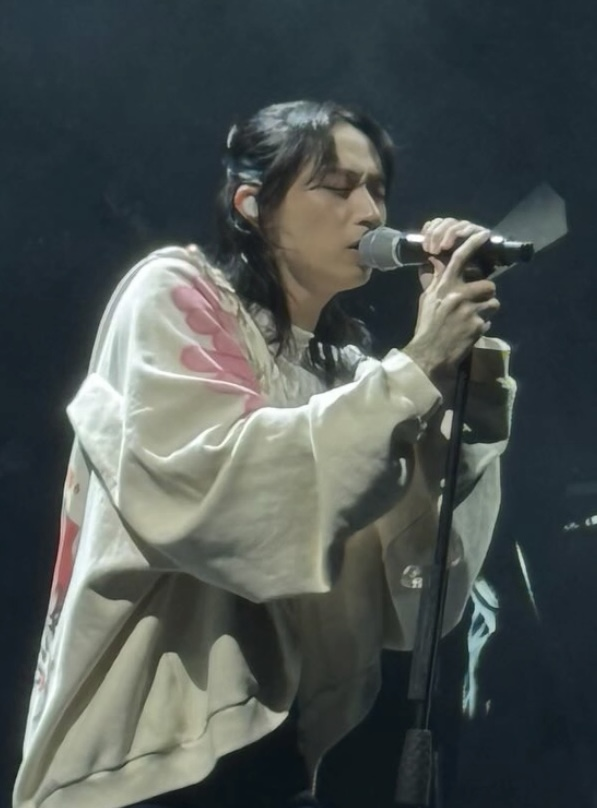
- Keshi in Manila in 2025
- Born: Casey Thai Luong; November 4, 1994 (age 32); Houston, Texas, U.S.
- Occupations: Singer; songwriter; record producer; multi-instrumentalist
- Musical career
- Genres: R&B; hip hop; alternative; indie pop
- Instruments: Vocals; guitar; keyboards
- Years active: 2017–present
- Label: Island
- Website: keshimusic.com

Casey Thai Luong (born November 4, 1994), known professionally as Keshi, is an American singer-songwriter, multi-instrumentalist, and record producer. He debuted in 2017 with the single "Over U", and has since gained recognition for his lo-fi and R&B works with emotional lyricism. The following year, Keshi released his first extended play The Reaper. His debut album Gabriel was released in 2022, and his sophomore album Requiem was released in 2024. Both albums reached the top 30 on the US Billboard 200. Three of his singles have been certified gold in Australia and Canada. He has embarked on multiple global headlining tours in support of his music.

== Early life ==
Casey Thai Luong was born in Houston, Texas to immigrant parents from Vietnam and grew up in Sugar Land. His parents worked as computer programmers. Despite living in an ethnically diverse community with a large Asian American population, he often felt out of place and disconnected from his heritage while growing up.

Keshi was inspired to learn how to play the guitar by Drake Bell's character on Drake & Josh. He taught himself the instrument using his grandfather's classical guitar and Vietnamese music book. Keshi graduated from Stephen F. Austin High School and earned a Bachelor of Science in Nursing from the University of Texas at Austin. Later, he worked as an oncology nurse at the Texas Medical Center for two years.

The stage name "Keshi" is the childhood nickname his fiancée's parents gave him. He and his fiancée have known each other since they were in fifth grade of elementary school.

== Career ==
In 2017, he adopted the moniker "Keshi" and began to share music on his SoundCloud page. His debut single, "Over U", was released in 2017. He credited tutorial videos on YouTube for teaching him in writing, producing, and engineering music. Keshi gained a small following after posting his first released song, "If You're Not the One for Me Who Is" on a Subreddit's monthly music competition. Keshi released The Reaper on November 13, 2018. In 2019, he quit his job as a nurse and signed with Island Records. That same year, Keshi released his Skeletons EP on July 16 and embarked on "Skeletons Tour" in support of said album. In 2020, Keshi released two EP albums: Bandaids on March 24 and Always on October 23.

On March 25, 2022, Keshi released his debut studio album, Gabriel. That same year, he embarked on the global "Hell/Heaven Tour" to support the album. Keshi also embarked on the global "Hell & Back Tour" with Deb Never, Weston Estate, No Rome, and James Ivy in 2023. He later embarked on the Asian "Epilogue Tour" in 2023.

On September 13, 2024, Keshi released his second studio album, Requiem. The album was recorded as a tribute to Sebastian Sdaigui, a friend and collaborator who died shortly before the release of Gabriel. He embarked on the "Requiem World Tour" with Mac Ayres, Boylife, and Starfall to support the album in 2024 and 2025.

== Artistry ==
Keshi has cited John Mayer, Frank Ocean, The 1975, Drake, Bryson Tiller, Queen, Michael Jackson, and Nick Drake as his musical influences.

== Discography ==
=== Studio albums ===
Title	Details	Peak chart positions				Certifications
Title	Details	US	AUS	CAN	NZ	Certifications
Gabriel	Released: March 25, 2022; Label: Island; Formats: CD, vinyl, digital download, streaming	16	72	70	—	MC: Gold
Requiem	Released: September 13, 2024; Label: Island; Formats: CD, vinyl, digital download, streaming	27	14	41	21	

=== Extended plays ===
Title	Details	Peak chart positions		Track listing
Title	Details	US Heat.	US Sales	Track listing
The Reaper	Released: November 13, 2018; Label: Self-released; Formats: Digital download, streaming, LP	—	—	Track listing: 1. "The Reaper"; 2. "Like I Need You"; 3. "2 Soon"; 4. "I Swear I'll Never Leave Again"
Skeletons	Released: July 16, 2019; Label: Island; Formats: Digital download, streaming	5	50	Track listing: 1. "Atlas"; 2. "Skeletons"; 3. "Summer"; 4. "XOXO Sos"
Bandaids	Released: March 24, 2020; Label: Island; Formats: Digital download, streaming	—	72	Track listing: 1. "Less of You"; 2. "Alright"; 3. "Blue"; 4. "Right Here"; 5. "Bandaids"
Always	Released: October 23, 2020; Label: Island; Formats: Digital download, streaming	—	76	Track listing: 1. "Always"; 2. "More"; 3. "Drunk"; 4. "Talk"; 5. "B.Y.S."; 6. "Us"

=== Single albums ===
Title	Details	Track listings
If You're Not the One for Me Who Is	Released: October 23, 2017; Label: Self-released; Formats: Streaming	Track listing: 1. "If You're Not the One for Me Who Is"; 2. "Goes to Waste"; 3. "They Don't Fly as High as They Used To"
Good Days	Released: May 10, 2018; Label: Self-released; Formats: Streaming	Track listing: 1. "Good Days"; 2. "Say Something"; 3. "Godsplan"
Bandaids (Live Sessions)	Released: April 17, 2020; Label: Island Records; Formats: Streaming	Track listing: 1. "Alright" (live sessions); 2. "Bandaids" (live sessions)

=== Singles ===
==== As lead artist ====
Title	Year	Peak chart positions								Certifications	Album
Title	Year	IND	JPN Over.	MLY	NZ Hot	PHL	SGP	TWN	VIE	Certifications	Album
"Over U"	2017	—	—	—	—	—	—	—	—		Non-album single
"If You're Not the One for Me Who Is"	2017	—	—	—	—	—	—	—	—		If You're Not the One for Me Who Is
"As Long as It Takes You"	2017	—	—	—	—	—	—	—	—		Non-album singles
"Magnolia"	2017	—	—	—	—	—	—	—	—		Non-album singles
"Just Friends"	2017	—	—	—	—	—	—	—	—		Non-album singles
"Good Days"	2018	—	—	—	—	—	—	—	—		Non-album singles
"Onoffonoff"	2018	—	—	—	—	—	—	—	—		Non-album singles
"2 Soon"	2018	—	—	—	—	—	—	—	—		The Reaper
"Right Here"	2019	—	—	—	—	—	—	—	—	MC: Gold	Bandaids
"Blue"	2019	—	—	—	—	—	—	—	—		Bandaids
"More"	2020	—	—	—	—	—	—	—	—		Always
"Always"	2020	—	—	—	—	—	—	—	—		Always
"Drunk"	2020	—	—	—	—	—	—	—	—	MC: Gold	Always
"Beside You"	2021	—	—	—	7	—	—	—	—	ARIA: Gold; MC: Platinum	Non-album single
"Somebody"	2021	—	—	—	24	—	—	—	—	MC: Gold	Gabriel
"Touch"	2022	—	—	—	24	—	—	—	—		Gabriel
"Get It"	2022	—	—	—	—	—	—	—	—		Gabriel
"Limbo"	2023	10	—	14	—	20	23	—	16	ARIA: Gold; MC: Gold	Gabriel
"Understand"	2023	—	—	—	—	—	—	—	—	ARIA: Gold; MC: Platinum; RMNZ: Gold	Gabriel
"Say"	2024	—	—	—	9	—	28	—	—		Requiem
"Dream"	2024	—	—	—	21	—	—	—	—		Requiem
"Texas"	2024	—	—	—	31	—	—	—	—		Requiem
"Wantchu"	2025	—	15	—	3	—	16	8	—		Non-album singles
"Miss Me"	2026	—	—	—	10	—	—	5	—		Non-album singles
"—" denotes releases that did not chart, chart did not exist, or were not released in that region.

==== As featured artist ====
Title	Year	Peak chart positions	Album
Title	Year	NZ Hot	Album
"Pillows" (with EaJ)	2020	—	Non-album single
"War With Heaven"	2021	—	Shang-Chi and the Legend of the Ten Rings: The Album
"Sociopath" (with Jeremy Zucker)	2021	—	Crusher
"It's You" (Max featuring Keshi)	2022	23	Non-album single
"Baby Chop" (Boylife featuring Keshi and No Rome)	2025	—	Jones

=== Other charted songs ===
Title	Year	Peak chart positions				Album
Title	Year	MLY	NZ Hot	PHL	SGP	Album
"Night"	2024	—	15	—	—	Requiem
"Soft Spot"	2024	23	7	68	10	Requiem
"Like That"	2024	—	13	—	—	Requiem
"Bodies"	2024	—	17	—	—	Requiem
"Kiss Me Right"	2024	—	19	—	—	Requiem

=== Songwriting credits ===
Title	Year	Artist(s)	Album	Credits	Written with
"(What I Wish Just One Person Would Say to Me) aka Happy for You"	2020	LANY	Mama's Boy	Co-writer/guitarist	Paul Jason Klein
"Forever"	2020	Rei Brown	—N/a	Co-writer	George Miller and Ray Brown
"Tanlines"	2025	Boylife	Jones	Co-writer/vocals	Boylife, Gabriele Durastanti, Nick Velez, Daniel Chae, and Benny Bock

== Tours ==
- Skeletons Tour (2019)
- Hell / Heaven Tour (2022)
- Hell & Back Tour (2023)
- Epilogue Tour (2023)
- Requiem World Tour (2024–2025)

== See also ==
- History of Vietnamese Americans in Houston
- Asian Americans in arts and entertainment
