= Thru These Tears =

Single by LANY

from the album Malibu Nights
- Written: January 29, 2018
- Released: July 17, 2018
- Recorded: May 2018
- Genre: Pop; indie pop; synth-pop
- Length: 3:24
- Label: Side Street; Polydor
- Songwriters: Paul Klein; Alexandra Yatchenko Artourovna
- Composer: King Henry
- Producers: LANY; Mike Crossey; King Henry

LANY singles chronology
"Super Far" (2017)	"Thru These Tears" (2018)	"I Don't Wanna Love You Anymore" (2018)

Music video
- "Thru These Tears" on YouTube

"Thru These Tears" is a song by the American indie pop band, LANY. It served as the lead single for their second album, Malibu Nights (2018), on July 17, 2018.

== Background and development ==
"I'm so proud of how I walked through that season. I made the absolute most of it. I'm not just a better writer and a better artist, I'm a better person. I feel so much more in touch with who I am and how I think and feel.. It's been the most productive 45 days of my life."

— Paul Klein, vocalist of LANY

The song served as the eighth track from their second album, Malibu Nights, and released as the third single on July 17, 2018. "Thru These Tears" is the band's first release since their debut album, LANY (2017). According to band frontman Paul Klein, the song was finished on January 29 and represents "the worst 45 days of my life". The song is the official first look into the "moon era" for the band.

"Thru These Tears" was written by Klein as he navigated a difficult breakup. The primary inspiration struck one night when after having a dinner alone, the singer was driving home and began crying uncontrollably, forcing him to pull over to the side of the road. After crying, he had a moment of clarity and self-realization, thinking, "You absolutely are gonna be OK. You just can’t see it right now through your tears." This thought provided the song's core message and title. Klein created a demo the following day and sent it to bandmates Jake Goss and Les Priest. Goss immediately recognized its potential, believing it could be a pivotal song that "change[d] the course of the band." Although the initial verses were considered weak by Klein, the band spent two additional days collaboratively refining them until they were satisfied with the final track.

== Composition ==
Musically, "Thru These Tears" is a euphoric anthem pop ballad in synth-pop and indie pop style. It described as DIY and experimental indie-pop track that perfectly introduces this new sound to listeners. Erica Gonzales of Harper's Bazaar wrote that the track has the band’s signature alternative-meets-synth-pop sound, coupled with Klein’s ambient vocals and tweet-worthy lyrics. It's more upbeat, earworm-y, and at times borderline rock, but it’s still LANY.

Lyrically, the song is about to embody a surplus of different emotions and take you on a journey of highs and lows. It explores what lead singer Paul Klein describes as the worst 45 days of his life after he went through a devastating break up. Mabel Turley from MEDIUM wrote that the track is an emotional story that conveys the deep pain that is felt during and after heartbreak, the long recovery it involves, and the hope for better days. While premiering the single on Beat 1, the band frontman, Paul Klein told Zane Lowe it's "bigger than a breakup album," adding that "his is just about being human and going through the ups and downs." Matthew Eaton of RIFF MAGAZINE told that on “Thru These Tears,” LANY provided a vision of hope amid the heartbreak, declaring that things will be all right, despite the current feelings of hopelessness.

== Music video ==
The music video of "Thru These Tears" were directed by Tim Mattia It was released on August 3, 2018. The lyrics video were released a day after the single came out, on July 18, 2018.

== Live performances ==
LANY performed "Thru These Tears" live on The Late Late Show with James Corden on August 7, 2018.

== Track list ==
Digital download
No.	Title	Length
1.	"Thru These Tears"	3:24

== Credits and personnel ==
Credits adapted from Apple Music

- LANY - programming, producer
  - Paul Klein - songwriter, vocals, keyboards, guitar
  - Jake Goss - drums, percussion
  - Charles Leslie Priest
- Alexandra Artourovna Yatchenko - songwriter
- Taylor Johnson - guitar
- Mike Crossey - programming, producer, mixing engineer
- King Henry - composer, producer, additional producer
- Stephen Sesso - recording engineer

== Release history ==
Region	Date	Format	Label	Ref.
Various	July 17, 2018	Digital download; streaming	Side Street; Polydor	

== Charts ==
Chart performance for "Thru These Tears"
Chart (2026)	Peak position
Philippines (Hot 100)	54
