= Gg bb xx =

gg bb xx

Studio album by LANY
- Released: September 3, 2021
- Recorded: March–May 2021
- Studio: Conway, Los Angeles
- Genre: Pop; electropop
- Length: 38:13
- Label: Polydor; Side Street
- Producer: Andrew Goldstein; John Ryan; LANY

LANY chronology
Mama's Boy (2020)	gg bb xx (2021)	A Beautiful Blur (2023)

Singles from gg bb xx
- 1. "Dancing in the Kitchen" Released: June 25, 2021; 2. "Up to Me" Released: July 15, 2021; 3. "Never Mind, Let's Break Up" Released: August 19, 2021; 4. "Roll Over, Baby" Released: August 25, 2021; 5. "Ex I Never Had" Released: September 2, 2021

Gg bb xx (stylized in all lowercase) is the fourth studio album by American pop band LANY. Released on September 11, 2021 through Side Street Entertainment and Polydor Records, it serves as a follow-up to their third studio album, Mama's Boy (2020). It is the band's final album to feature keyboardist and guitarist Leslie Priest, who left the band the following year. The album was produced by Andrew Goldstein, John Ryan, and LANY.

The album was preceded by five singles. "Dancing in the Kitchen" was released as the lead single on June 25, 2021. A second single, "Up to Me", was released on July 15 along with a B-side, a demo of the album's fourth track "DNA". Two more promotional singles, "Never Mind, Let's Break Up" and "Roll Over, Baby", were each released in August while a music video for the song "Ex I Never Had" was released on September 2. In support of the album, LANY will embark on the gg bb xx Tour taking place in the United States, United Kingdom, and Canada.

== Background and recording ==
After wanting to record an album that was rooted in Southern country music, used more live instrumentation and was inspired by frontman Paul Klein's upbringing in Oklahoma, LANY released their third studio album, Mama's Boy on October 2, 2020. Due to the COVID-19 pandemic in the United States, the band was unable to tour to support the album. This resulted in the trio facing the decision to either take a break or start writing and recording sessions for a fourth studio album.

In December 2020, Klein began writing material for a fourth album which was teased on social media. The band began recording sessions at Conway Studios in Los Angeles with producer Andrew Goldstein. In May, the group concluded recording sessions. gg bb xx was announced on July 12, 2021 along with pre-orders and the announcement of the album's second single "Up to Me".

== Promotion ==
Gg bb xx was preceded by five singles. On June 25, 2021, the lead single "Dancing in the Kitchen" was released accompanied with its music video directed by Matty Peacock. The second single, "Up to Me", was released on July 15, alongside a demo recording of the album's fourth track "DNA". A third single, "Never Mind, Let's Break Up", was released on August 19. "Roll Over, Baby" was released as the album's fourth single on August 25. A music video for the song "Ex I Never Had" premiered on September 2.

Through the months leading up to the album's September release, LANY also released two collaborative singles. On June 9, 2021, the band released "I Quit Drinking", a collaboration with American country pop singer-songwriter Kelsea Ballerini, with a music video premiering on June 15. On the same day, LANY frontman Paul Klein and Ballerini debuted the song live at the 2021 CMT Music Awards. On August 6, LANY and 220 KID released the single "Stupid Feelings".

In support of gg bb xx, the trio will embark on a world tour beginning in the United Kingdom on September 23, 2021 and continuing with a 25-date run in the United States and Canada in October and November. The band performed a sold out headlining album release show at the Troubadour in Los Angeles on September 3, 2021.

== Track listing ==
Gg bb xx track listing
No.	Title	Writer(s)	Producer(s)	Length
1.	"Get Away"	Paul Klein; Ian Pollack; John Ryan	LANY; Andrew Goldstein; Ryan	3:05
2.	"Up to Me"	Klein; David Hodges; Whakaio Taahi	LANY; Goldstein	2:48
3.	"Never Mind, Let's Break Up"	Klein; Goldstein	LANY; Goldstein	2:42
4.	"DNA"	Klein; Andrew Albert; Dan Smyers; Jordan Reynolds	LANY; Goldstein	2:57
5.	"Roll Over, Baby"	Klein; Jesse Saint John; Goldstein	LANY; Goldstein	3:27
6.	"Live It Down"	Klein; Hodges	LANY; Goldstein	3:19
7.	"Dancing in the Kitchen"	Klein; Goldstein; Ryan; Pollack	LANY; Ryan	3:29
8.	"Ex I Never Had"	Klein; Goldstein; Kevin Fisher	LANY; Goldstein	3:21
9.	"Somewhere"	Klein; Tobias Jesso Jr.	LANY; Goldstein	3:36
10.	"Care Less"	Klein; Ryan; Pollack	LANY; Goldstein; Ryan	3:19
11.	"'Til I Don't"	Klein; Goldstein; Ryan; Pollack	LANY; Goldstein	2:59
12.	"One Minute Left to Live"	Klein; Ryan; Pollack	LANY; Goldstein; Ryan	3:13
Total length:				38:13

Deluxe edition bonus tracks
No.	Title	Writer(s)	Producer(s)	Length
13.	"I Die First"	Klein; Jesso	LANY; Goldstein	2:56
14.	"Remember That"	Klein; Noah Conrad	LANY; Goldstein; Conrad	3:22
15.	"I Didn't Lie"	Klein; Ingrid Andress; Conrad	Goldstein	2:54
16.	"They Don't Make 'Em Like You Anymore"	Klein; Emily Weisband; Reynolds	Goldstein	2:35
17.	"The Older You Get, The Less You Cry"	Klein; Goldstein; John	Goldstein	3:22
18.	"DNA" (demo)	Klein; Albert; Smyers; Reynolds	LANY; Goldstein	2:35
19.	"Stupid Feelings" (with 220 Kid)	Klein; Will Graydon; Jake Greene; Tom Hollings; Samuel Brennan; Jordan Shaw; Conor Blake	Billen Ted; 220 Kid	2:47
20.	"I Quit Drinking" (Kelsea Ballerini featuring LANY)	Kelsea Ballerini; Nicolle Galyon; Klein	Jimmy Robbins; Conrad	2:51
Total length:				60:01

Notes

- All song titles are in lowercase

== Personnel ==
LANY

- Paul Klein – lead vocals, keyboards, programming
- Jake Goss – drums, percussion
- Leslie Priest – keyboards, synthesizers, guitar

Additional musicians

- Andrew Goldstein – songwriter, composer, keyboards, guitars, programming
- Ian Pollack – songwriter, composer
- John Ryan – songwriter, composer, keyboards, guitars, programming
- Robin Schmidt – guitars

Technical

- Producers – Andrew Goldsten, John Ryan, Paul Klein
- Writers – Andrew Albert, Andrew Goldstein, Dan Smyers, David Hodges, Ian Pollack, Jesse Saint John, John Ryan, Jordan Reynolds, Kevin Fisher, Paul Klein, Tobias Jesso Jr., Whakaio Taahi
- Engineer – Eric Eylands
- Mixing engineer – Andrew Goldstein, Paul Klein
- Mastering engineer – Robin Schmidt
- Studio personnel – Andrew Goldstein, Eric Eylands, Paul Klein, Robin Schmidt

== Charts ==
Chart performance for gg bb xx
Chart (2021)	Peak position
Scottish Albums (Official Charts)	53
US Billboard 200	114
