= Super Far =

2017 single by LANY

Single by LANY

from the album LANY
- Released: June 28, 2017
- Genre: Electropop, indie pop
- Length: 3:23
- Label: Polydor
- Songwriters: Paul Klein; Ryan Tedder
- Producer: LANY

LANY singles chronology
"13" (2017)	"Super Far" (2017)	"Thru These Tears" (2018)

Music video
- "Super Far" on YouTube

"Super Far" is a song by American pop rock band LANY. It was released on June 28, 2017, as the third single from their self-titled debut studio album, which came out the same year. The song was written by vocalist Paul Klein and OneRepublic frontman Ryan Tedder.

== Content ==
The band explained that "Super Far" is about the emotional pain of a relationship where two people are physically present but emotionally distant from each other. The lyrics focus on a relationship where one person is more emotionally involved than the other. Lyrics such as "All my friends keep saying that I'm way too good to you" and "If this is love, I don't want it" point to the emotional distance between the two and the frustration that comes from putting in more effort than is returned.

== Music video ==
Jake, Les, and I flew back from tour and immediately went into 2 6-hour days of dance rehearsals then shot the music video the next day. It was hilarious and fun and pretty exhausting, but I'm really proud of us and proud of what we made. Listen.

—Paul Klein

The official music video for "Super Far" was released on September 12, 2017. The video was directed by Isaac Ravishankara. It features the three band members Paul Klein, Jake Goss, and Les Priest performing synchronized choreography against a brightly lit, continuously shifting backdrop.

Prior to the official release, an "unofficial" video was also released on August 25, 2017, chronicling the band recent tour experience.

=== Reception ===
The music video was described by Acid Stag noted that the visual utilized "simple choreographed dance moves" and that it "is as stunning as the track itself."

== Certifications ==
Certifications for "Super Far"
Region	Certification	Certified units/sales
New Zealand (RMNZ)	Gold	15,000^{‡}
United States (RIAA)	Gold	500,000^{‡}
^{‡} Sales+streaming figures based on certification alone.

== Charts ==
Chart performance for "Super Far"
Chart (2025)	Peak position
Philippines (Hot 100)	79

Chart performance for "Super Far"
Chart (2026)	Peak position
Philippines (Hot 100)	35
