= Dancing in the Kitchen (Lany song) =

2021 single by LANY

Single by LANY

from the album Gg bb xx
- Released: June 25, 2021
- Genre: Dream pop; synth-pop
- Length: 3:29
- Label: Side Street; Polydor
- Songwriters: Paul Jason Klein; Andrew Goldstein; John Ryan; Ian Pollack
- Producers: LANY; Ryan

LANY singles chronology
"I Quit Drinking" (2021)	"Dancing in the Kitchen" (2021)	"Stupid Feelings" (2021)

Music video
- "Dancing in the Kitchen" on YouTube

"Dancing in the Kitchen" (stylized in all lowercase) is a song by American indie pop band LANY. It served as the first single from their fourth album, Gg bb xx (2021), released on June 25, 2021.

== Background and development ==
I've heard about people writing two songs in one day, but I never have. Never tried, never really wanted to. I went in there and did that part for "Till I Don't,” came back in the room and said, "alright now, let's write ‘Dancing in the Kitchen’." That’s a real turning point in the writing process for that album, when we wrote that song.

—Paul Klein, on discussing about "Dancing in the Kitchen".

The song served as the seventh track from their fourth album, Gg bb xx (2021) and released as the lead single on June 25, 2021. "Dancing in the Kitchen" came after the band finished writing "'Til I Don't", the eleventh track on the album.

In the process of writing the latter track, the band vocalist, Paul Klein uses the phrase: "We fly around the world just to dance in the kitchen", which lead it to be the next track to be work as "Dancing in the Kitchen" after "Til I Don't" was written.

== Composition ==
"Dancing in the Kitchen" is a romantic song in the style of dream pop and synth-pop. The song has a length of 3 minutes and 29 seconds, composed by the vocalist of the band Paul Klein, Andrew Goldstein, John Ryan and Ian Pollock and set in the time signature of common time with a downbeat tempo of 94 beats per minute. The track is composed in the key of B major.

Luke Wells of Euphoria states that with keys adding the warmth to the depth of the song down the stretch, exuding a sonic palette akin to earlier LANY works. The tropical beat is soon met by susurrate synths that soar and blanket the vocal in a gospel-esque haze, with a side of soft drums and subtle guitar that scream summer vibes soaked in calmness.

== Music video ==
The music video was released same day with the single on June 25, 2021 and directed by Matt Peacock.

== Personnel ==
Credits adapted from TIDAL

- LANY - Producer
- Paul Klein - Songwriting, Co-mixing engineer, keyboard, programmer, lead vocal
- Andrew Goldstein - Songwriting, producer, co-mixing engineer, guitar, keyboard, programmer
- Ian Pollack - Songwriting
- John Ryan - Songwriting
- Eric Eylands - Engineer
- Robin Schmidt - Mastering Engineer

== Release history ==
Region	Date	Format	Label	Ref.
Various	June 25, 2021	Music download: Streaming	Street Side: Polydor Records	
