= Soft (LANY album) =

Studio album by LANY
- Released: October 10, 2025
- Length: 34:01
- Label: Sunset Garden; Virgin
- Producer: LANY; Tommy King

LANY chronology
A Beautiful Blur (2023)	Soft (2025)

Singles from Soft
- 1. "Know You Naked" Released: August 1, 2025; 2. "Last Forever" Released: September 6, 2025

Soft is the sixth studio album by American alternative rock duo LANY. Released on October 10, 2025 through their own imprint Sunset Garden and distributed via Virgin Music Group, it was preceded by the lead single "Know You Naked".

On March 13, 2026, the band released five bonus tracks accompanied by a live video, called Soft 2.

== Track listing ==
Soft track listing
No.	Title	Writer(s)	Length
1.	"Soft"	Paul Klein; Steph Jones; Jimmy Robbins	2:58
2.	"Why"	Klein; Nicolle Galyon; Henry Allen	3:20
3.	"Know You Naked"	Klein; Galyon; Mark Trussell	3:25
4.	"Stuck"	Klein; David Hodges; Jones	3:03
5.	"Sound of Rain"	Klein; Jack Kenworthy	3:32
6.	"Act My Age"	Klein; Jake Goss; Galyon	3:46
7.	"Good Parts"	Klein; Scott Harris; Jonah Shy	3:10
8.	"Make Me Forget"	Klein; Andrew Goldstein; J Hart	3:26
9.	"Destiny"	Klein; Jimmy James; Aodhan King	3:38
10.	"Last Forever"	Klein; Galyon; King Henry	3:43
Total length:			34:01

Soft 2 track listing
No.	Title	Writer(s)	Length
11.	"I'm Doing Alright"	Klein; Goss; Mike Crossey	3:58
12.	"Prettiest Thing I've Ever Seen"	Klein; Hodges; Whakaio Taahi	4:08
13.	"How to Hold An Angel"	Klein; Allen; Gaylon	3:07
14.	"When Did You Stop Loving Me?"	Klein; Gaylon; Robbins	3:51
15.	"Finish Me"	Klein; Hodges; Hillary Lindsey	3:34
Total length:			52:54

== Personnel ==
Credits adapted from Tidal.

=== LANY ===
- Jake Goss – drums, production
- Paul Klein – vocals, production (all tracks); keyboards (tracks 9, 10)

=== Additional contributors ===
- Tommy King – production, drum programming, piano, synthesizer (all tracks); engineering (1, 2, 4–10), bass (6, 8), keyboard bass (7)
- Spike Stent – mixing
- Randy Merrill – mastering
- Jon Yeston – engineering
- Dave Emery – Atmos mixing
- Eric Ruscinski – engineering assistance (all tracks), electric guitar (7)
- Lui Guimaraes – engineering assistance
- Pino Palladino – bass (1–4, 10)
- Andrew Aged – electric guitar (1, 3, 6, 7, 9, 10), acoustic guitar (3)
- Henry Solomon – saxophone (1, 2)
- Taylor Johnson – acoustic guitar (2, 4), electric guitar (4, 7)
- Tyler Nuffer – pedal steel guitar (2, 6)
- Cary Singer – electric guitar (5)
- Mike Crossey - production (11)

== Charts ==
Chart performance for Soft
Chart (2025)	Peak position
Australian Albums (ARIA)	92
