= Malibu Nights =

Studio album by LANY
- Released: October 5, 2018
- Recorded: 2018
- Genre: Pop; soft rock; synth-pop
- Length: 33:20
- Label: Side Street; Polydor
- Producer: LANY; Mike Crossey; King Henry; Malay; SG Lewis

LANY chronology
LANY (2017)	Malibu Nights (2018)	Mama's Boy (2020)

Singles from Malibu Nights
- 1. "Thru These Tears" Released: July 17, 2018; 2. "I Don't Wanna Love You Anymore" Released: August 22, 2018; 3. "Thick and Thin" Released: September 12, 2018; 4. "If You See Her" Released: October 1, 2018; 5. "Malibu Nights" Released: October 16, 2018

Professional ratings
Review scores
Source	Rating
AllMusic	3/5 stars

Malibu Nights is the second studio album by American indie pop band LANY. It was released on October 5, 2018, by Side Street Entertainment and Polydor Records. The album was produced by Mike Crossey.

The album was promoted by four singles with one promotional single, including the ballad lead single "Thru These Tears".

== Writing and recording ==
Malibu Nights was written and recorded in early 2018 following the end of a romantic relationship frontman Paul Jason Klein was having with English singer Dua Lipa. Klein says he wrote music as a form of catharsis without the idea of an album in mind but realized after "50 days" that he had written the band's second album. Klein later stated he was thankful for experiencing heartbreak as it allowed him a productive and therapeutic outlet.

The album was originally planned to be called January but was renamed to be more universal.

== Music ==
The album's sound was characterised as "airy, treacly and catchy" by Bandwagon Asia. Billboard called it the band's "most vulnerable work to date" and a set of "nine lush pop songs". The lead single "Thru These Tears" was called a "somber exploration of lost love" and "a song about finding the hope in sorrow". Second single "I Don't Wanna Love You Anymore" details the "anguish and heartache felt after a lover unexpectedly leaves frontman and lead vocalist Paul Jason Klein", with the pre-chorus: "Sick of staring up at the ceiling. How'd you change your mind just like that? The only way to get past this feeling, is to tell myself you're not coming back".

Along with lyrics about "love, longing and loss in the wake of heartbreak", the album incorporates more guitar, piano and drums than their self-titled debut. The album's title track is based around a piano instrumental.

== Promotion ==
The album was announced in an Instagram post in March 2018, and later promoted with a performance of lead single "Thru These Tears" on The Late Late Show with James Corden in August 2018.

== Track listing ==
No.	Title	Writer(s)	Producer(s)	Length
1.	"Thick and Thin"	Paul Klein; Jacob Goss; Alexandra Yatchenko; Jake Greene; Nolan Lambroza	LANY; Mike Crossey	3:32
2.	"Taking Me Back"	Klein; James Abrahart; Aaron Zuckerman	LANY; Crossey	3:14
3.	"If You See Her"	Klein; Emily Schwartz; David Pramik	LANY; Crossey; Malay	3:02
4.	"I Don't Wanna Love You Anymore"	Klein; Goss; Jake Greene; Yatchenko; Henry Allen	LANY; Crossey; King Henry^{[a]}	3:21
5.	"Let Me Know"	Klein; Samuel G. Lewis	LANY; Crossey; SG Lewis	4:36
6.	"Run"	Klein; Yatchenko; Allen	LANY; Crossey; King Henry	3:48
7.	"Valentine's Day"	Klein; Goss; Les Priest	LANY; Crossey	3:37
8.	"Thru These Tears"	Klein; Goss; Jake Greene; Yatchenko; Allen	LANY; Crossey; King Henry^{[a]}	3:24
9.	"Malibu Nights"	Klein; Tobias Jesso Jr.	LANY; Crossey	4:46
Total length:				33:20

Japanese edition bonus track
No.	Title	Length
10.	"I Don't Wanna Love You Anymore" (live at Conway Studio)	4:36
Total length:		38:02

== Personnel ==
Credits adapted from the liner notes of Malibu Nights.

LANY

- Paul Klein – lead vocals (all), keyboard (all), guitar (1, 8)
- Jake Goss – drums, sampling pad (all)
- Les Priest (Note: Despite being credited as a member of the band, Priest has only songwriting credits and no performing credits.)

Additional personnel

- Taylor Johnson - guitar (1, 3–5, 7, 9)

== Charts ==
Chart performance for Malibu Nights
Chart (2018)	Peak position
Belgian Albums (Ultratop Flanders)	164
Canadian Albums (Billboard)	92
Irish Albums (IRMA)	98
UK Albums (OCC)	81
US Billboard 200	36
