= Stupid Feelings =

2021 single by 220 Kid and LANY

Single by 220 Kid and LANY
- Released: 6 August 2021
- Genre: Dance-pop; house
- Length: 2:46
- Label: Polydor
- Songwriters: Conor Blake; Jordan Shaw; Paul Klein; Samuel Brennan; Tom Hollings; Will Graydon
- Producers: Billen Ted; 220 Kid

220 Kid singles chronology
| "Unconditional" (2021) | "Stupid Feelings" (2021) | "I'll Take You Down" (2021) |

LANY singles chronology
| "Dancing in the Kitchen" (2021) | "Stupid Feelings" (2021) | "Never Mind, Let's Break Up" (2021) |

"Stupid Feelings" is a song by English producer and DJ 220 Kid and American pop band LANY. It was released on 6 August 2021 via Polydor Records.

== Content ==
In a press release, "Stupid Feelings" is "a musical juxtaposition with heartfelt and emotive lyrics from LANY in contrast with a light, uplifting and progressive beat delivered by 220 Kid." The song is written in the key of F♯ minor, with a tempo of 124 beats per minute.

== Credits and personnel ==
Credits adapted from AllMusic.

- 220 Kid – primary artist, producer, vocals, composer
- Conor Blake – composer mixing
- Samuel Brennan – composer
- Jake Greene – songwriter
- Mike Crossey – vocal producer
- Tom Hollings – composer
- Paul Klein – composer, vocals, songwriter
- LANY – primary artist
- Jordan Shaw – composer
- Edward Sokolowski – mastering engineer
- Billen Ted – mixing, producer

== Charts ==
=== Weekly charts ===
Weekly chart performance for "Stupid Feelings"
| Chart (2021) | Peak position |
|---|---|
| New Zealand Hot Singles (RMNZ) | 37 |
| US Hot Dance/Electronic Songs (Billboard) | 14 |

=== Year-end charts ===
Year-end chart performance for "Stupid Feelings"
| Chart (2021) | Position |
|---|---|
| US Hot Dance/Electronic Songs (Billboard) | 89 |
