= A Beautiful Blur =

A Beautiful Blur (Note: The album was originally announced as "I Really Really Hope So", and some physical copies still carry the original name.)
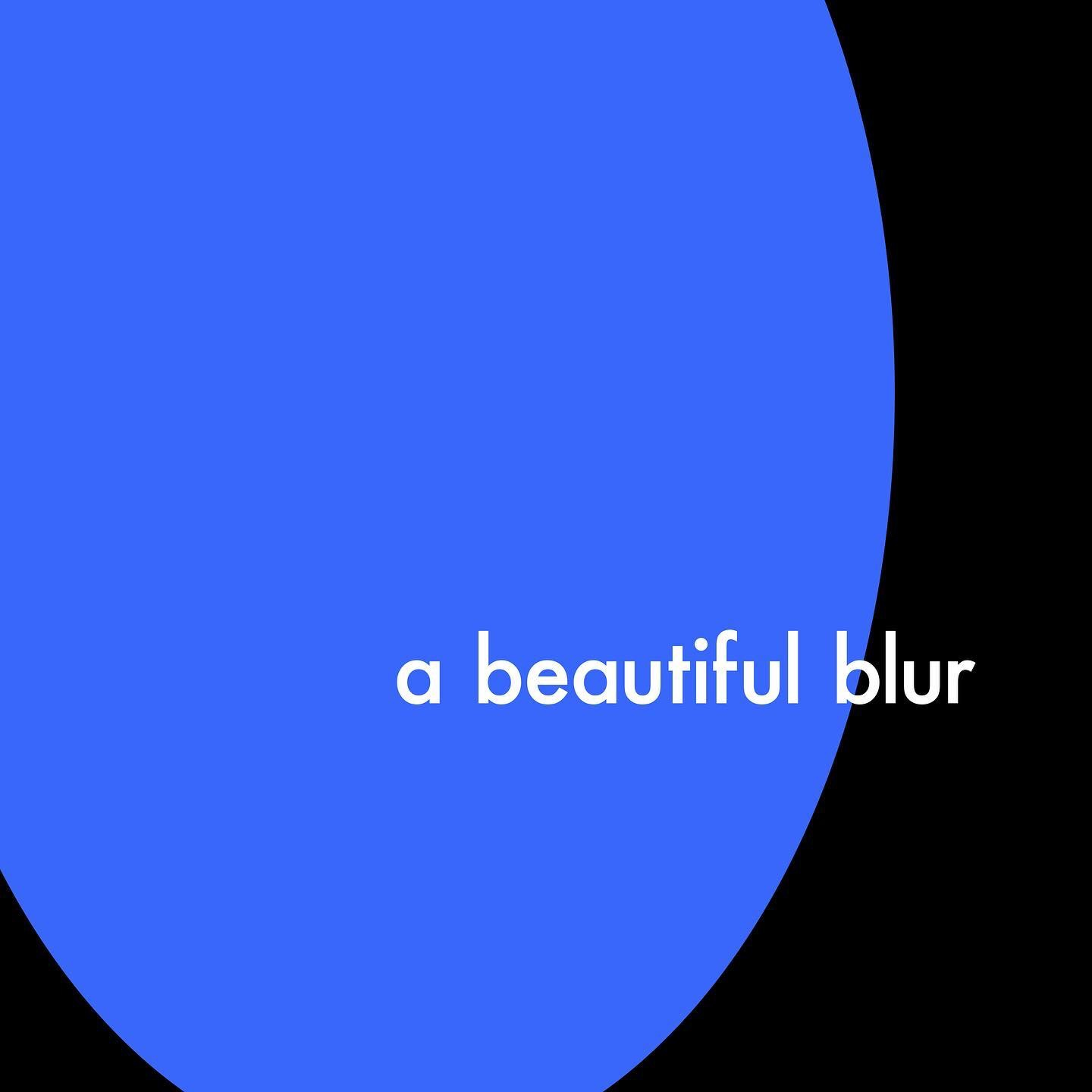

Studio album by LANY
- Released: September 29, 2023
- Genre: Pop; synth-pop; pop rock; soft rock
- Length: 47:37
- Label: Sunset Garden; Virgin
- Producer: Mike Crossey; LANY

LANY chronology
gg bb xx (2021)	A Beautiful Blur (Note: The album was originally announced as "I Really Really Hope So", and some physical copies still carry the original name.) (2023)	Soft (2025)

Singles from A Beautiful Blur
- 1. "Congrats" Released: August 24, 2022; 2. "Love at First Fight" Released: June 7, 2023; 3. "Alonica" Released: July 7, 2023; 4. "XXL" Released: August 4, 2023; 5. "Home Is Where the Hurt Is" Released: September 12, 2023

A Beautiful Blur is the fifth studio album by American alternative rock duo LANY. Released on September 29, 2023, through their own imprint Sunset Garden and distributed via Virgin Music Group, it is the follow-up to 2021's gg bb xx, their first album for Virgin since departing from Polydor and Interscope Records, and their first album without keyboardist/guitarist Leslie Priest.

== Background and development ==
The writing for the album came after Les Priest's departure. Priest had become less involved with the band over time, and in an interview for Hypebeast, Paul Klein stated, "To be super honest, it hasn't changed at all. We support Les and everything that he does, and obviously, he has given us his blessing to continue on in this band. The first album, we made it just the three of us in a kitchen on a Dell computer. Les was kind of our engineer, less of a traditional keyboardist. Over the next few albums, we began working with people who were older and wiser, and we learned from them. Really, the only thing that has changed was who was behind the computer." After the band had fulfilled their record contract with Polydor and Interscope Records, they decided not to resign, stating it gave the band more creative freedom and time to write and record their next album.

== Promotion ==
The album was announced on 29 May 2023 via posts on social media, followed by the first single "Love at First Fight". To promote the album, the band announced a European and an Asian tour.

On September 18, the band officially announced that they had changed the album name from I Really Really Hope So to A Beautiful Blur, stating the album's title was originally A Beautiful Blur, and also changed the album art.

A small promotional and acoustic tour was announced on 25 September 2023, through the US, entitled "A Beautiful Blur *IRL".

== Track listing ==
A Beautiful Blur track listing
No.	Title	Writer(s)	Length
1.	"XXL"	Paul Klein, James Abrahart, Jesse Saint John, Andrew Goldstein	3:27
2.	"Out of My League"	Klein, Abrahart, Madison Love, Johnathan Simpson	3:26
3.	"Sugar & Cinnamon"	Klein, Abrahart, Love, Simpson	3:36
4.	"I Pray"	Klein, Sasha Alex Sloan, Henry Allen	3:03
5.	"Home Is Where the Hurt Is"	Klein, Phil Plested, Tom Barnes, Pete Keller, Ben Kohn	4:01
6.	"It Even Rains in LA"	Klein, Jake Goss, Leland, Goldstein	3:35
7.	"Heartbreak Can Wait"	Klein, Ryan Tedder, John Ryan	3:21
8.	"(Saturday Night) 3:22 A.M."	Klein, Sloan, King Henry	4:23
9.	"Love at First Fight"	Klein, Sloan, King Henry	3:12
10.	"Congrats"	Klein, Sloan, King Henry	3:37
11.	"'Cause You Have To"	Klein, Abrahart, John, Goldstein	4:11
12.	"Alonica"	Klein, Goss, Aodhan King, Mike Crossey	3:58
13.	"No"	Klein, Sloan, King Henry	3:47
Total length:			47:37

== Personnel ==
LANY

- Paul Klein – lead vocals (all tracks), guitars (tracks 1–11, 13), bass guitar (all tracks), keyboards (all tracks)
- Jake Goss – drums (all)

Additional personnel

- Taylor Johnson – guitars (tracks 1–4, 6, 9–12)
- Mike Crossey – production
- Stephen Sesso – engineer
- Robin Schmidt – mastering engineer

== Charts ==
2023 Chart performance for A Beautiful Blur
Chart (2023)	Peak position
Australian Albums (ARIA)	4
UK Record Store Albums (OCC)	13
US Billboard 200	120
US Independent Albums (Billboard)	26
US Top Alternative Albums (Billboard)	16

2024 Chart performance for A Beautiful Blur
Chart (2024)	Peak position
UK Record Store Albums (OCC)	6
