= Okay (LANY and Julia Michaels song) =

American Song

Single by LANY and Julia Michaels
- Released: April 23, 2019
- Recorded: January 9, 2019
- Length: 2:49
- Label: Side Street Entertainment; Polydor
- Songwriters: Julia Michaels; Paul Jason Klein
- Producers: LANY; Mike Crossey

LANY singles chronology
"Malibu Nights" (2018)	"Okay" (2019)	"Mean It" (2019)

Julia Michaels singles chronology
"What a Time" (2019)	"Okay" (2019)	"Hurt Again" (2019)

Music video
- "Okay" on YouTube

"Okay" (stylized in lowercase) is a song by American band LANY and American singer Julia Michaels. The song was released on April 23, 2019.

== Background ==
Of the writing of the song, Michaels told Zane Lowe of Beats 1 "It was a pretty intense day. Emotionally, we had both been going through a lot... and it was our first time really even meeting. So when you have that time together, and then you're like, 'Okay, let's spill everything out on the table' it can get a little heavy. There was a point where [Paul] looked at me, very serious, and said, 'I'm going to be okay, right?' And I was like, 'Oof, we have to write this.'"

== Music video ==
The music video was released on May 24, 2019. In the clip, Michaels and LANY lead singer Paul Klein wander around the Santa Monica beachfront in solitude. They both end up at a roller derby, skating around and observing a masked dancer under a giant disco ball.

== Reception ==
Madeline Roth from MTV said "The way [Michaels] and Klein repeat the song's central lyric — "I'm gonna be okay / Right?" — makes it both a declarative statement and a self-conscious query." adding "their voices are intertwined throughout, breaking the traditional formula of a collaboration wherein artists take turns trading verses."

Rania Aniftos from Billboard said "It's so common to feel so low after a heartbreak that you start to wonder if you'll ever be okay again. That's the question LANY and Julia Michaels are tackling in their new collaboration. The tune is surprisingly catchy and light for such a heavy topic, but the rhythmic beat adds to the feeling of, yes, maybe I will be okay amidst the darkness."

Mike Wass from Idolator called the song "another gem" for Michaels.

== Charts ==
Chart (2019)	Peak position
New Zealand Hot Singles (RMNZ)	16

== Release history ==
Region	Date	Format	Label	Ref.
Various	April 23, 2019	Digital download; streaming	Side Street Entertainment; Polydor	
