= I Quit Drinking =

2021 single by Kelsea Ballerini and LANY

Single by Kelsea Ballerini and LANY
- Released: June 9, 2021
- Genre: Country pop
- Length: 2:51
- Label: Black River
- Songwriters: Nicolle Galyon; Kelsea Ballerini; Paul Jason Klein
- Producers: Jimmy Robbins; Noah Conrad

Kelsea Ballerini singles chronology
"Half of My Hometown" (2021)	"I Quit Drinking" (2021)	"Heartfirst" (2022)

LANY singles chronology
"Cowboy in LA" (2020)	"I Quit Drinking" (2021)	"Dancing in the Kitchen" (2021)

Music video
- "I Quit Drinking" on YouTube

"I Quit Drinking" is a song by American singer Kelsea Ballerini and American pop band LANY. It was released on June 9, 2021, via Black River Entertainment. Ballerini co-wrote the song with Nicolle Galyon and Paul Jason Klein, while Jimmy Robbins and Noah Conrad produced it.

== Background and content ==
Ballerini first performed the song with Paul Klein of pop group LANY at the 2021 CMT Music Awards. According to a press release, "I Quit Drinking" is a "break up anthem about quitting drinking" due to it "bring[ing] back too many memories of a past relationship". A press release by Black River Entertainment mentioned the song "describe[s] a couple whose relationship was centered around being the life of the party. When the giddy romance fizzles out, it seems, so does the appeal of the booze."

== Critical reception ==
Rob Costa of Music Talkers praised the combination for doing "a great job painting a picture of reflection, relationships, sacrifice, and the reasons for getting sober. The work put into creating conversational lyrics has paid off here, making the lyrics a real highlight of the song."

== Music video ==
The music video was released on June 15, 2021, and directed by Blythe Thomas. The video was filmed in "the hills of California". It shows Ballerini and Klein as "former lovers recalling happier times together" who can no longer "enjoy the taste of champagne, whiskey, or other alcoholic beverages now" due to it "remind[ing] them of their days as a couple". Finally they sing face-to-face in a rainstorm.

== Commercial performance ==
"I Quit Drinking" debuted at number 30 on the Billboard Hot Country Songs chart dated June 26, 2021, after its release.

== Charts ==
=== Weekly charts ===
Weekly chart performance for "I Quit Drinking"
Chart (2021)	Peak position
New Zealand Hot Singles (RMNZ)	31
US Adult Pop Airplay (Billboard)	19
US Hot Country Songs (Billboard)	30

=== Year-end charts ===
Year-end chart performance for "I Quit Drinking"
Chart (2021)	Position
US Hot Country Songs (Billboard)	93

== Certifications ==
Certifications for "I Quit Drinking"
Region	Certification	Certified units/sales
Australia (ARIA)	Gold	35,000^{‡}
Canada (Music Canada)	Platinum	80,000^{‡}
United States (RIAA)	Gold	500,000^{‡}
^{‡} Sales+streaming figures based on certification alone.

== Release history ==
Release history for "I Quit Drinking"
Region	Date	Format	Label	Ref.
Various	June 9, 2021	Digital download; streaming	Black River	
United States	July 19, 2021	Adult contemporary radio	RED	
