= Mean It =

Single by Lauv and LANY

from the album How I'm Feeling
- Released: November 14, 2019
- Genre: New wave; pop; electropop
- Length: 3:52
- Label: AWAL
- Songwriters: Ari Leff; Paul Klein; Jake Greene; Michael Matosic; Michael Pollack; John Hill; Jordan Palmer
- Producers: LANY; Mike Crossey; Lauv

Lauv singles chronology
"Make It Right" (2019)	"Mean It" (2019)	"Changes" (2020)

LANY singles chronology
"Okay" (2019)	"Mean It" (2019)	"Good Guys" (2020)

Music video
- "Mean It" on YouTube

"Mean It" is a song by American singer Lauv and American indie pop band LANY. It was released on November 14, 2019, as the seventh single from Lauv's debut studio album, How I'm Feeling (2020).

== Background ==
Speaking about the track, Lauv stated "I started 'Mean It' from the perspective of what I thought somebody might want to say to me (I’m not perfect and I’ll be the first to admit it). Paul [Klein] and I had been talking about working together for a long time, then one day I texted him the idea for the song and it just clicked".

== Music video ==
The music video for "Mean It" was released on December 17, 2019. Set in the deserts of Los Angeles, it features Lauv and LANY's lead singer Paul Klein dancing around painted red rocks and a vintage convertible car.

== Charts ==
Chart performance for "Mean It"
Chart (2019)	Peak position
Australia (ARIA)	42
Belgium (Ultratip Bubbling Under Flanders)	32
Ireland (IRMA)	46
Lithuania (AGATA)	33
Malaysia (RIM)	3
Netherlands (Single Tip)	9
New Zealand Hot Singles (RMNZ)	4
Philippines (Philippines Hot 100)	33
Singapore (RIAS)	2
Slovakia Singles Digital (ČNS IFPI)	95
Sweden Heatseeker (Sverigetopplistan)	12
Switzerland (Schweizer Hitparade)	87
UK Singles (Official Charts)	83
US Bubbling Under Hot 100 (Billboard)	19
US Digital Song Sales (Billboard)	49

Chart (2026)	Peak position
Philippines Hot 100 (Billboard Philippines)	33

== Certifications ==
Certifications for "Mean It"
Region	Certification	Certified units/sales
Australia (ARIA)	Gold	35,000^{‡}
New Zealand (RMNZ)	Gold	15,000^{‡}
United States (RIAA)	Gold	500,000^{‡}
^{‡} Sales+streaming figures based on certification alone.
