= LANY =

American pop/rock band

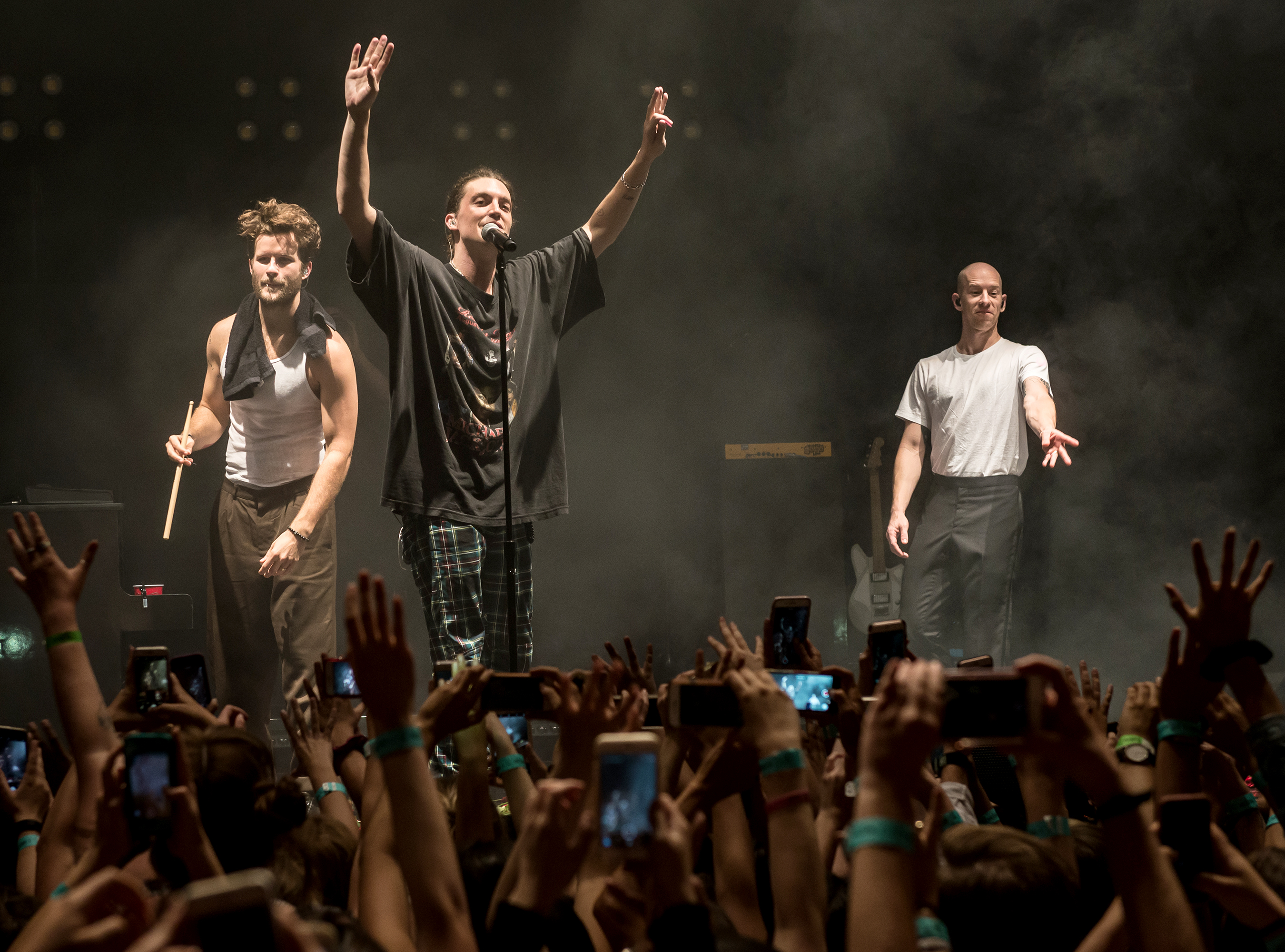
- LANY performing in 2017. Left to right: Jake Goss, Paul Klein & Les Priest

Background information
- Origin: Nashville , Tennessee, U.S.
- Genres: Alternative rock; indie pop; synth-pop; dream pop; pop punk; pop rock
- Years active: 2014–present
- Labels: Polydor; Interscope; Side Street; For the World; Sunset Garden; Virgin
- Members: Paul Klein; Jake Goss
- Past members: Les Priest
- Website: thisislany.com

LANY (/ˈleɪni/, an acronym for "Los Angeles, New York") is an American pop rock band from Los Angeles. Formed in Nashville in 2014, the band consists of guitarist and lead vocalist Paul Klein and drummer Jake Goss.

Through Polydor and Interscope Records, the band released four albums: LANY (2017), Malibu Nights (2018), Mama's Boy (2020), and gg bb xx (2021). Of their singles, the most successful are the RIAA-certified "ILYSB" (2015), "Super Far" (2017), "Malibu Nights" (2018), the Julia Michaels collaboration "Okay" (2019), and "Mean It" with Lauv (2019). In September 2023, the band released their fifth studio album A Beautiful Blur. This was their first album on their own imprint Sunset Garden and distributed via Virgin Music Group, following their departure from Polydor and Interscope Records. On July 30, 2025, the band announced their sixth studio album, Soft, which released on October 10, 2025.

== History ==
=== 2014–2017: Musical beginnings and LANY ===
LANY were formed in March 2014 when Paul Jason Klein, who had a small solo career, flew to Nashville to meet up with friends Jake Goss and Les Priest. Previously, Goss and Priest had a separate project by the name of WRLDS, but this was discontinued after the formation of LANY. Klein had been classically trained in piano and had been playing since early childhood. The following month they anonymously uploaded two songs, "Hot Lights" and "Walk Away", to their SoundCloud account with zero followers in order to differentiate between their old and new projects. These two songs were recorded within the space of four days. In an interview, Klein explains that after the release of these singles, they began receiving emails from record labels within six days, of which he still does not know how they found the music. Their debut EP, Acronyms, followed later that year, with the song "ILYSB" generating significant interest online, reaching more than 100,000 hits. Singles "Made in Hollywood" and "Bad, Bad, Bad" soon followed, along with the reveal of their identities.

LANY is an acronym for "Los Angeles New York". Klein explained the name in an interview:

"We knew we wanted a four-letter word because of design and aesthetic purposes, but as you can imagine, all the four-letter words in the entire world are taken. We moved to acronyms and for a while we thought we would be TTYL, but then we decided we didn’t want to be 13 for the rest of our lives. I eventually thought of the span across the country from L.A. to New York, and at first I was thinking it would be L-A-N-Y, but people kept getting confused on how to pronounce it when I told them, saying things like 'L-A-and-Y?' So then we’re like forget it—let's call ourselves LANY, pronounced Lay-Nee."

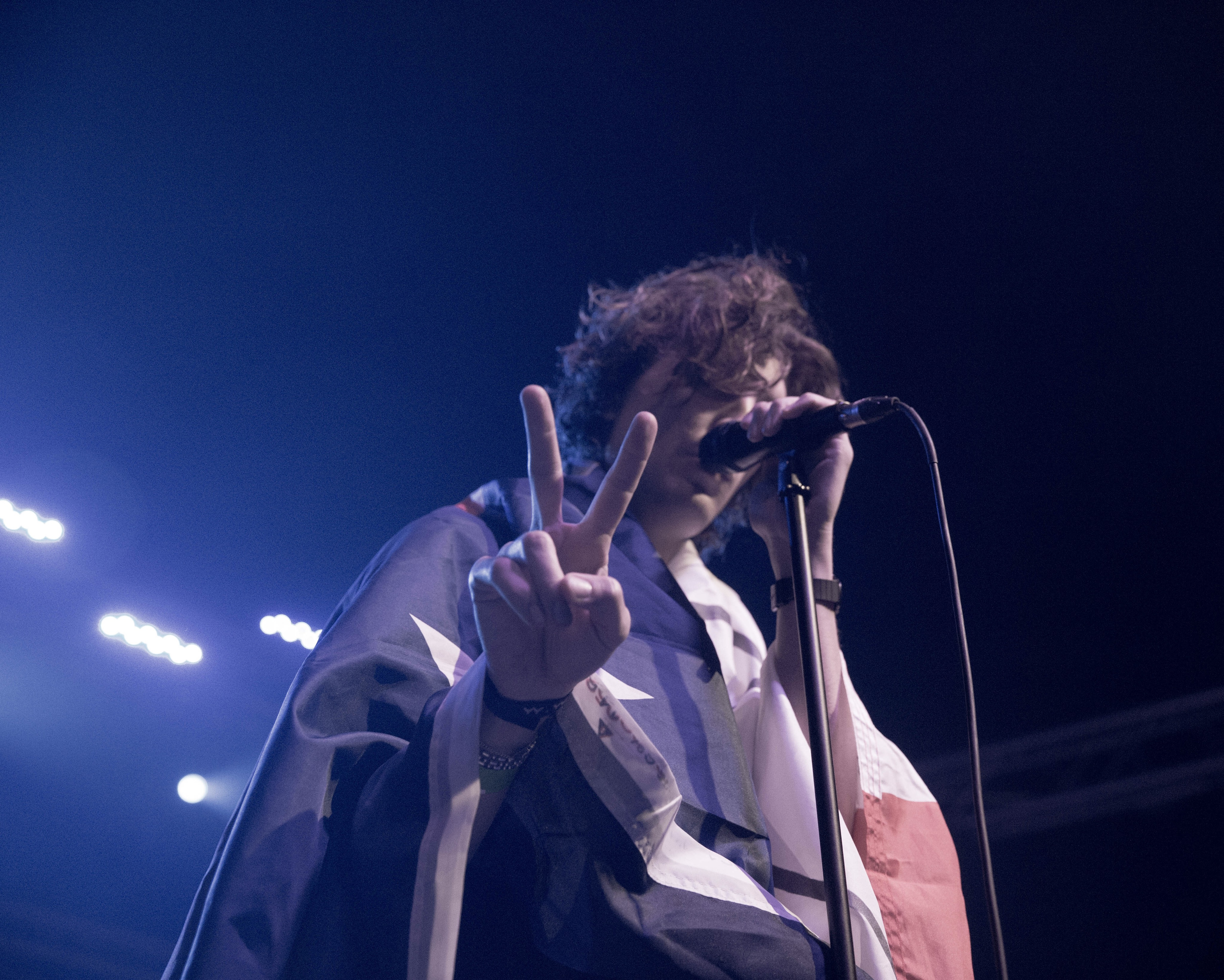
Paul Klein of LANY in Dallas, Texas on September 11, 2015.

In 2015, LANY embarked on American tours supporting Twin Shadow, Tove Styrke, X Ambassadors, Troye Sivan and Halsey. A second EP titled I Loved You. followed, as did festival appearances including Lollapalooza.

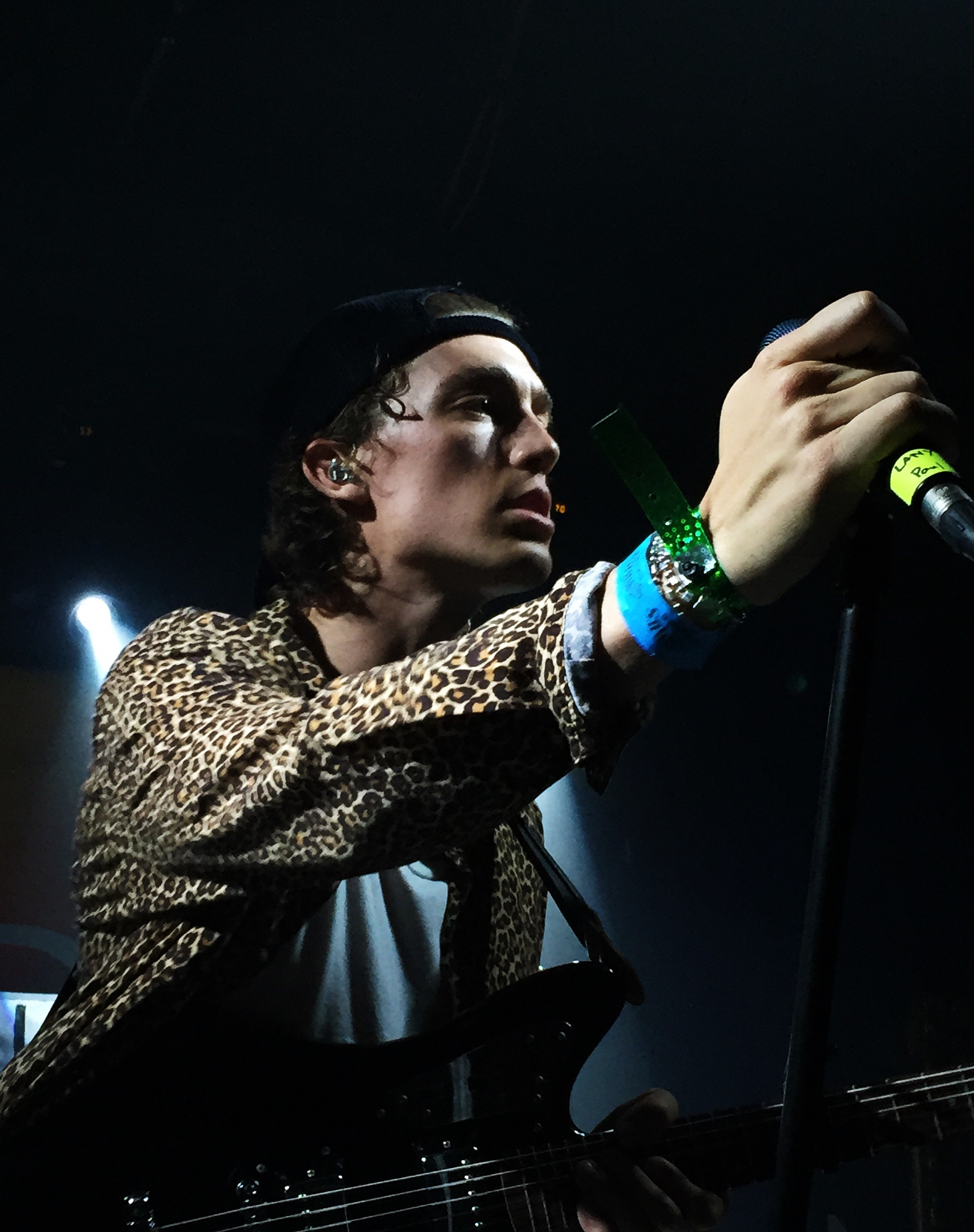
Paul Klein of LANY in Dallas, Texas on July 23, 2015.

In December 2015, after signing to Polydor Records, a re-release EP titled Make Out was released consisting of all songs (not including "Hot Lights" and "OMG") released prior to I Loved You. Shortly after this, a UK support tour with Ellie Goulding was announced for March 2016 and a live stripped back version of "ILYSB" was released on YouTube. A US support tour with Troye Sivan ran through February, followed by the announcement of their first US headline tour, The Make Out Tour, in May. On March 11, 2016, LANY released a single titled "Where the Hell Are My Friends". The track debuted on Beats 1 with Zane Lowe. One month later, they released their first music video for the song.

After their headline tour in May, LANY played a series of festivals in mid-2016, including Bonnaroo, Firefly, and Outside Lands.

LANY began their second headline tour in the fall of 2016, called the Kinda Tour, in support of their EP by the same name. It included 14 European dates and 37 US dates.

On February 15, 2017, LANY announced they would be opening up for seven shows of John Mayer's The Search for Everything Tour. It included five U.S. dates and two dates in Canada. Klein credits Mayer as a significant influence to himself and to the band.

Through their official Instagram and Twitter, the band announced that they would be releasing their debut album, LANY, on June 30, 2017, to be preceded by the singles "Good Girls" on March 3, as well as "It Was Love", "The Breakup", and "13".

On June 30, 2017, LANY released their debut self-titled album. The single "Super Far" debuted on Zane Lowe's Beats 1 on Apple Music preceding the release of the full-length album. The band held pop-up shops in Los Angeles and New York to promote the album. They have released music videos for "Good Girls", "ILYSB", and "Super Far". The band announced a US headline tour that occurred from September through November 2017. LANY spent the summer of 2017 playing festivals and touring Australia and Asia. They toured Europe in the winter of 2017.

=== 2018–2019: Malibu Nights ===
LANY announced their second album, Malibu Nights, on March 8, 2018, via an Instagram post. Klein stated that the album was written from January 4 to February 14, 2018.

On April 5, 2018, LANY had their first arena concert at the Smart Araneta Coliseum in the Philippines. Tickets for the show were sold out in 24 hours, leading to a second show the next night.

The first single, "Thru These Tears", was released on July 17. The album's second single, "I Don't Wanna Love You Anymore", was released on August 22, 2018. Their highly anticipated second studio album, "Malibu Nights", was released on October 5, 2018, consisting of nine songs. In 2018, LANY embarked on their Malibu Nights World Tour beginning on October and lasting until October 2019. The band released "Okay", a single with singer Julia Michaels, on April 23, 2019. This was their first song to include a featured artist. On November 14, 2019, LANY collaborated with American singer-songwriter Lauv for the song “Mean It”, which ultimately was listed on Lauv's debut album, How I'm Feeling. On December 17, 2019, the music video was released, featuring both artists in the deserts of Los Angeles.

From July 23 to 25, LANY sold out three consecutive shows in Manila, at the Mall of Asia Arena.

=== 2020: Mama's Boy ===
On April 30, 2020, LANY announced the title of their third album, Mama's Boy, via social media. The album was released on October 2, 2020. On May 13, they released the album's lead single, "Good Guys". On July 1, their second single "If This Is the Last Time" was released. The album's third single, "You!", was released on August 13, 2020. Two months later on October 2, 2020, they released their third studio album titled Mama's Boy. To promote the album, the band announced 5 dates in the United Kingdom and Ireland for 2021. Pre-sale began on September 30 while the general sale began on October 2. The band has announced more dates to come on a later date.

=== 2021–2022: gg bb xx and Priest's departure ===
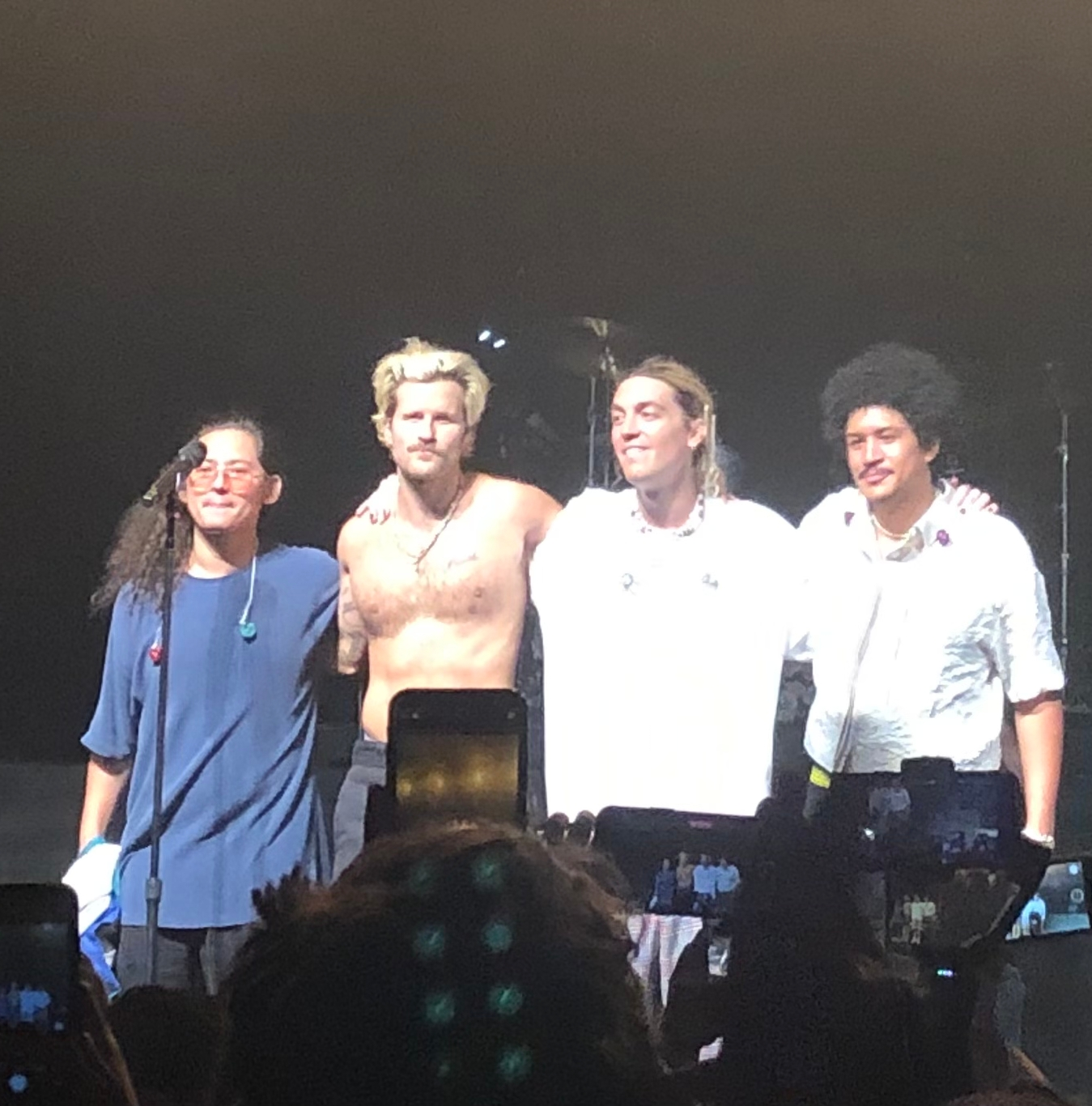
LANY in 2021. Left to right: Kim Vi, Jake Goss, Paul Klein & Puff Scarborough

On February 4, 2021, LANY released the deluxe edition of Mama's Boy. This included the release of three new versions of songs—"Heart Won't Let Me" (stripped), "Sad" (stripped), and "I Still Talk to Jesus" (live). "I wanted the outer to sound and feel like I was playing this song alone in a Sunday school room with the door slightly cracked, and you were listening down the hall," Klein said of the original recording. The live rendition of the track draws listeners even closer and into the room alongside LANY. On July 12, LANY announced that their fourth album, gg bb xx, would be released on September 3. The single rollout began with the release of "Dancing in the Kitchen" on June 25.

The deluxe version of gg bb xx was released on November 5, adding 5 additional songs to the record, along with the demo version of "DNA" that was released as a single simultaneously with "Up to Me". Also included were previous collaborations, "I Quit Drinking" with Kelsea Ballerini, and "Stupid Feelings" with 220 Kid.

On April 7, 2022, the band announced the departure of keyboardist Les Priest, who had left "to focus on life as a writer/producer in Nashville." The remaining two members of the group decided not to replace him but just to continue as a duo.

=== 2023–2024: A Beautiful Blur ===
On May 29, 2023, LANY announced their fifth album, titled A Beautiful Blur, which was released on September 29, 2023. Its first single, "Congrats", was released on 24 August 2022. This was followed by another single "Love at First Fight", announced on their Instagram page. This was their first project without keyboardist/guitarist Leslie Priest. Initially titled I Really Really Hope So, the album was later renamed to A Beautiful Blur on September 19, 2023; a few days before the release. The album has a total of 13 songs, with Paul being the lead vocals, bass guitar and keyboards for all tracks with Jake on drums. The album peaked on number 4 in Australian charts and number 120 on US Billboard 200. The album announcement was followed by a world tour from 2023 - 2024.

=== 2025–present: Soft ===
On July 30, 2025, LANY announced their sixth studio album, Soft, which was released on October 10, 2025. The first single "Know You Naked" was released on August 1, 2025. This was followed by another single "Last Forever", released on September 5, 2025, this being the closing track on their upcoming album. The album has a total of 10 songs. On 13 March 2026, LANY released "Soft 2", which adds 5 more songs.

== Band members ==
Current members

- Paul Jason Klein – lead vocals, piano, keyboards, guitar (2014–present)
- Jake Clifford Goss – drums, percussion, samples (2014–present)

Current touring musicians

- Eric "Puff" Scarborough – keyboards, guitar, bass, background vocals (2021–present)
- Kim Vi – keyboards, bass, guitar, background vocals (2021–present)

Former members

- Charles Leslie Priest – keyboards, synthesizers, guitar, backing vocals (2014–2022)

Former touring musicians

- Giuliano Pizzulo – keyboards, guitar, background vocals (2018–2020)

== Discography ==
- LANY (2017)
- Malibu Nights (2018)
- Mama's Boy (2020)
- Gg bb xx (2021)
- A Beautiful Blur (2023)
- Soft (2025)

== Tours ==
Headline

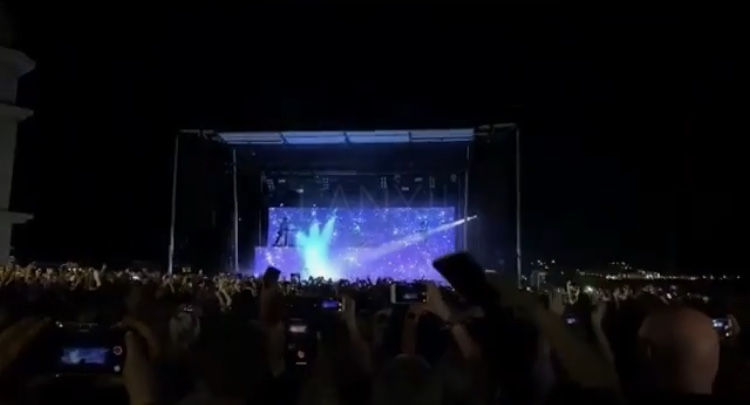
LANY on the Malibu Nights World Tour in Salt Lake City on June 11, 2019

- The Make Out Tour (2016)
- Kinda Tour (2016)
- LANY World Tour (2017–2018)
- Malibu Nights World Tour (2018–2019)
- gg bb xx Tour (2021)
- Summer Forever Tour (2022)
- A November to Remember Tour (2022)
- First The Moon, Then The Stars: A Tour Before A World Tour (2023)
- A Beautiful Blur: The World Tour (2023–2024)
- Soft World Tour (2026)

Promotional

- LANY: Live at Ayala Malls Philippines (2017)

Supporting

- Zella Day – Zella Day On Tour (2015)
- Halsey – Badlands Tour (2015–2016)
- Ellie Goulding – Delirium World Tour (2016)
- Troye Sivan – Blue Neighbourhood Tour (2016)
- John Mayer – The Search for Everything World Tour (2017)
