= LANY (album) =

2017 album by LANY

Studio album by LANY
- Released: June 30, 2017
- Recorded: 2014–2016
- Studio: Hoop Dreams
- Genre: Electropop; indie electronic; pop rock; indie pop
- Length: 56:50
- Label: Polydor; Side Street
- Producer: LANY; Sir Nolan

LANY chronology
Kinda (2016)	LANY (2017)	Malibu Nights (2018)

Singles from LANY
- 1. "ILYSB" Released: November 11, 2016; 2. "Good Girls" Released: March 3, 2017; 3. "It Was Love" Released: April 7, 2017; 4. "The Breakup" Released: May 5, 2017; 5. "13" Released: June 2, 2017; 6. "Super Far" Released: June 28, 2017

LANY is the self-titled debut studio album by American band LANY. It was released on June 30, 2017, by Polydor Records and contains the single "ILYSB".

== Reception ==
Professional ratings
Aggregate scores
Source	Rating
Metacritic	66/100
Review scores
Source	Rating
AllMusic	3/5 stars
The A.V. Club	C+
Clash	7/10

LANY received mixed reviews from critics. On Metacritic, the album holds a score of 66/100 based on 6 reviews, indicating "generally favorable reviews".

== Track listing ==
All tracks are written by Jake Goss, Paul Klein, and Charles Priest, except where noted. All tracks produced by LANY, except where noted.

No.	Title	Length
1.	"Dumb Stuff"	2:32
2.	"The Breakup"	3:56
3.	"Super Far" (writers: Klein, Ryan Tedder)	3:23
4.	"Overtime"	3:31
5.	"Flowers on the Floor"	4:18
6.	"Parents" (writer: Susan Goss)	1:18
7.	"ILYSB" (writers: J. Goss, Klein, Priest, Oskar Engstrom)	3:31
8.	"13"	3:54
9.	"Hericane"	5:46
10.	"Hurts"	3:36
11.	"Good Girls" (writers: Klein, John Luke Lewis; producers: Sir Nolan, LANY)	4:09
12.	"Pancakes"	3:52
13.	"Tampa"	3:41
14.	"Purple Teeth"	3:53
15.	"So, Soo Pretty"	1:42
16.	"It Was Love"	3:48
Total length:		56:50

== Charts ==
Chart performance for LANY
Chart (2017)	Peak position
Australian Albums (ARIA)	53
Belgian Albums (Ultratop Flanders)	186
New Zealand Heatseeker Albums (RMNZ)	4
Scottish Albums (OCC)	82
UK Albums (OCC)	90
US Billboard 200	32
US Top Alternative Albums (Billboard)	5
US Top Rock Albums (Billboard)	4
