= Alice Wu =

American film director and screenwriter

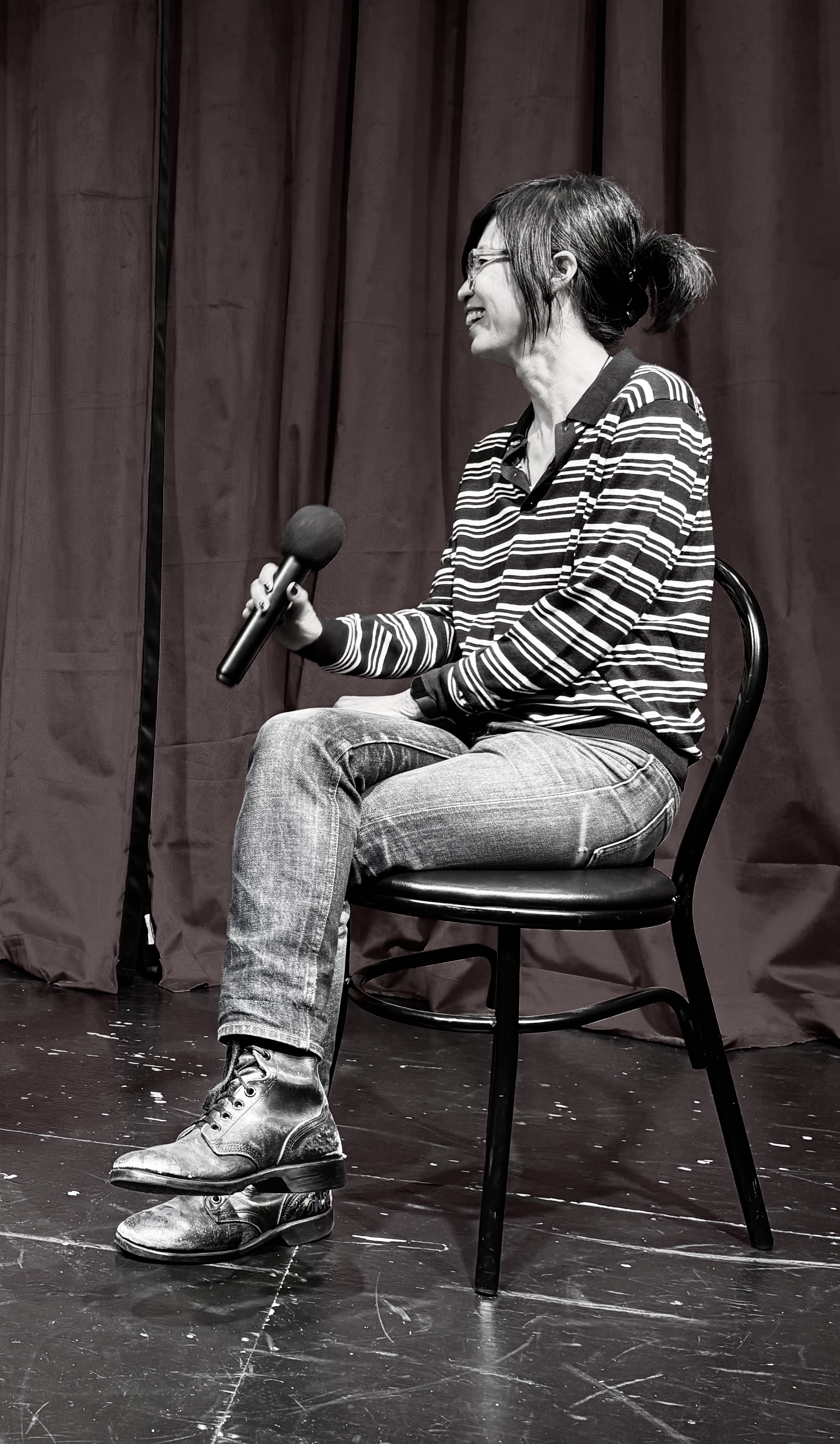
- Wu in 2025
- Born: April 21, 1970 (age 56); San Jose, California, U.S.
- Education: Massachusetts Institute of Technology (attended); Stanford University (BS, MS)
- Occupations: Filmmaker, screenwriter

Alice Wu (Chinese: 伍思薇; born April 21, 1970) is an American film director and screenwriter, known for her films Saving Face (2004) and The Half of It (2020).

Both of her films feature Chinese-American main characters and explore the lives of intellectual, lesbian characters. A number of production companies offered to buy the script for Saving Face, but Wu opted not to sell it in order to uphold an authentic portrayal of the Taiwanese-American community. Saving Face and Wu's impact on the industry have paved the way for greater Asian representation in the film industry today. Her work has inspired Asian-American actresses such as Awkwafina and Lana Condor.

== Early life and education ==
Alice Wu was born in San Jose, California to Taiwanese American immigrant parents. Her family eventually moved to Los Altos, California, where she graduated from Los Altos High School in 1986. She enrolled at the Massachusetts Institute of Technology at the age of 16. She later transferred to Stanford University, where she earned her B.S. in computer science in 1990 and her master's degree in computer science in 1992. Before becoming a filmmaker, Wu worked as a software engineer for Microsoft in Seattle.

== Career ==
While working at Microsoft, Wu began writing a novel. Deciding the story would work better as a film, she signed up for a 12-week screenwriting class at the University of Washington in which she penned the script for her first feature film. She then left the corporate world and eventually moved to New York City to pursue a filmmaking career full-time.

=== Saving Face (2004) ===
Encouraged by her screenwriting teacher, she left Microsoft in the late 1990s to try to turn the script for her first feature film Saving Face into a film, giving herself a five-year window. Production had begun when she reached the fifth year. In 2001, the script for Saving Face won the Coalition of Asian Pacifics in Entertainment screenwriting award.

Saving Face was released in 2004. The film was inspired by her own experiences coming out as a lesbian in the Taiwanese American community. She has said that she would like the audience to come away from it "with this feeling that, no matter who they are, whether they are gay or straight, or whatever their cultural make-up is, that if there is something that they secretly wanted, whether it's this feeling that they could actually have that great love or whatever it is, that it's never too late to have that. I want them to leave the theater feeling a sense of hope and possibility." Alice struggled with her sexual identity and when she came out as a lesbian she had a difference of opinions with her mother which led to a fall out between the two. In an interview with Jan Lisa Huttner, Wu noted that not all of her audience was female, Asian, or lesbian. She found it "highly unusual" that "you can take a group that seems so specific, and make them universally human".

The film has been influential within both lesbian and Chinese communities. It heavily focuses on the challenges faced within the Chinese-American community, dealing with issues of the role of women and lesbian identity. Wu also explores relationships between mothers and daughters in the Chinese-American community through her portrayal of the relationship between the film's main character and her mother. Although she claims that the film's main character is not an autobiographical portrayal of her real life, it was partially a way to provide positive representation for her own mother.

Saving Face has secured Wu as a role model for other Chinese-Americans in the film industry. Awkwafina had a Saving Face poster hanging up in her bedroom in Flushing, Queens. She describes the film as "the first film that spoke to her as an Asian-American."

The film had its world premiere at the 2004 Toronto International Film Festival, and its U.S. premiere at the 2005 Sundance Film Festival. Sony Pictures Classics released the film in May 2005.

=== Interim ===
After Saving Face, Wu subsequently worked on a film based on Rachel DeWoskin's memoir, Foreign Babes in Beijing: Behind the Scenes of a New China. The movie, however, did not make it past pre-production.

In 2008, she sold a pitch to ABC called "Foobar" based on her experiences working as a woman in the tech world.

After the pitch, Wu left the industry for a period to take care of her mother who was ill. She lived off of her savings and income from Microsoft and Saving Face and kept a low profile. However, most of her friends hadn't had a clue what she was doing, career-wise. When asked if they knew what she had been doing all these years between "Foobar" and The Half of It, her “Saving Face” friends had hardly any idea.

=== The Half of It (2020) ===
After her mother's condition improved, Wu started writing again, but continually encountered writer's block. To get over this hurdle, Wu wrote a $1,000 check out to the National Rifle Association of America, an organization she despises, and gave it to her friend. She told her, "if this first draft is not written, you are sending that check in." This draft evolved into The Half of It, a coming-of-age comedy-drama film written, directed, and produced by Wu.

The feature script appeared on the Black List in 2018. The film is a romantic comedy which follows a Chinese-American teenager as she helps a boy win over his crush, who she also has a romantic interest in. It is loosely based on her own teenage bond with an unexpected friend. The film stars Charmed actress Leah Lewis, Daniel Diemer, and Alexxis Lemire in the leading roles. The film was announced in April 2020 as the winner of the Founders Award for Best Narrative Feature at the 2020 Tribeca Film Festival. It was released on Netflix on May 1, 2020 and received highly positive reviews.

In 2022, Wu wrote and directed the commercial "The Note," for Oreo, in collaboration with PFLAG. "The Note" showcases one step in a young Chinese American man’s coming out journey and emphasizes the role family members can play as lifelong allies for their LGBTQ+ loved ones.

== Awards and honors ==
In March 2005, Wu's film Saving Face was the opening film at the San Francisco International Asian American Film Festival. Later that year, she received the Visionary award at the San Diego Asian Film Festival to celebrate her directorial debut for Saving Face, and was nominated in the breakthrough director category at the Gotham Independent Film Awards, although she did not win. In 2006, Saving Face received a nomination at the GLAAD Media Awards, and it won the Viewer's Choice Award at the Golden Horse Awards, Taiwan's equivalent of The Academy Awards. In 2019, the film was named one of the 20 Best Asian American Films of the Last 20 Years by The Los Angeles Times.

In April 2020, Wu's film The Half of It won the Founders Award for Best Narrative Feature (in the U.S. Narrative Competition category) at the 2020 Tribeca Film Festival.

In June 2020, in honor of the 50th anniversary of the first LGBTQ Pride parade, Queerty named her among the fifty heroes “leading the nation toward equality, acceptance, and dignity for all people”.

In 2021, Wu was nominated for an Independent Spirit Award for Best Screenplay for The Half of It.

In 2026, she received the Torchbearer "Carrying Change" Awards' Legend Award.

== Personal life ==
Wu is a lesbian, and finally came out to herself while taking a feminist studies class at Stanford. Wu came out to her mother during a conversation with her (in Mandarin Chinese) about the class.

Wu lives a private life.

== Filmography ==
Year	Title	Position
2004	Saving Face	Writer and director
2020	The Half of It	Writer, director, producer
2020	Over the Moon	Writer

== See also ==
- List of female film and television directors
- List of lesbian filmmakers
- List of LGBT-related films directed by women
