= Elemental (soundtrack) =

Elemental (Original Motion Picture Soundtrack)

Soundtrack album by Thomas Newman
- Released: June 16, 2023
- Recorded: 2023
- Studios: Newman Scoring Stage; Fox Studio Lot
- Genre: Score
- Length: 1:13:48
- Label: Walt Disney

Thomas Newman chronology
A Man Called Otto (2022)	Elemental (2023)	White Bird: A Wonder Story (2024)

Singles from Elemental
- 1. "Steal the Show" Released: June 2, 2023

Elemental (Original Motion Picture Soundtrack) is the soundtrack album to Pixar's 2023 film of the same name. The original score is composed by Thomas Newman in his fourth Pixar film, following Finding Nemo (2003), WALL-E (2008), and Finding Dory (2016).

Director Peter Sohn collaborated with Newman on the score. Newman used cultural influences and instruments originating from different places across the globe to reflect the multicultural nature of the story. The scoring was held at Newman Scoring Stage and Fox Studio Lot in Los Angeles. In addition to instrumental tracks, the soundtrack included an original song called "Steal the Show" performed by Lauv, who wrote the music alongside Newman and lyrics alongside Michael Matosic.

The song was released on June 2, 2023, two weeks ahead of the release of the movie and soundtrack. The score was released by Walt Disney Records on June 16, 2023, the same day as the film's theatrical release. It received mostly positive reception for incorporating many elements of cultural influences from eastern countries, particularly Indian music.

== Background and production ==
"I think they are different and therefore yeah, there's a different approach. But it's still here's a bit of music. Maybe in terms of pace and shape, animation changes a lot more mood shifts a lot quicker. In live action, there can be extended moods that you can kind of hide behind. Here's just a vibe that goes on for two minutes. Where in animation, it can be a vibe that goes on for 10 seconds, and then changes to something else. So it's more action oriented. Forgetting action, live action, that it may be a psychological drama, where music is just doing less. Music is doing a lot in an animated movie, it's being asked a lot."

— Thomas Newman, on the score for Elemental

On February 7, 2023, Thomas Newman was confirmed to compose the score for Elemental. It marks Newman's fourth collaboration with Pixar after Finding Nemo (2003), WALL-E (2008), and Finding Dory (2016), as well as his first film with the studio not to be directed by Andrew Stanton. Director Peter Sohn noted that Pixar brought back Newman to collaborate with Sohn to tell an emotional story of a character caught between two worlds to musically bring Elemental to life. Sohn stated, "It was a dream to just get to work with Thomas Newman; he's just been someone that I've always admired. I say that because I used a lot of his music as temp and when making the reels."

One of the biggest challenges for scoring the film was the opening montage where Bernie and Cinder Lumen immigrate to Element City. To ensure that Elemental was a global story, Newman used cultural influences from across the globe using Chinese and Indian instruments by incorporating elements. The sitar, mandolins and brass instruments all fit his search, although the electronic wind instrument can be heard, which is accompanying a male vocalist for Newman by saying, "It was about taking certain sounds from the EWI and the vocals and combining them... it gave that sense of color and spirit".

On June 2, 2023, it was announced that Lauv performed the original song called "Steal the Show" that plays during Ember and Wade's dates as well as the end credits, which was released that day. On writing the song, Lauv sat down with Newman, who gave him a couple of sounds that he was working with.

== Track listing ==
All music is composed by Thomas Newman, except as noted.

No.	Title	Writer(s)	Artist	Length
1.	"Across the Ocean"			3:35
2.	"Elemental"			3:42
3.	"Sháshà r íshà"			2:29
4.	"Stop Wade!"			2:43
5.	"Hot Air Balloon"			2:58
6.	"Bubble Date"			2:51
7.	"Headphones"			0:45
8.	"Fern Grouchwood"			1:40
9.	"Beach Glass"			3:23
10.	"Cloud Puff Fireball"			0:48
11.	"Clod"			0:46
12.	"Blue Flame"			2:17
13.	"Meet the Ripples"			1:56
14.	"Love Scooter"			1:21
15.	"Crying Games"			1:22
16.	"Grand Re-Opening"			0:38
17.	"Tìshôk' (Embrace The Light)"			1:37
18.	"Pipe Blows"			2:36
19.	"Run for Your Life"			2:42
20.	"Kol-Nuts"			2:13
21.	"Red Dot Sale"			0:46
22.	"1000mph"			2:28
23.	"Smoke Reading"			0:44
24.	"Rusty Hint of Motor Oil"			0:57
25.	"Mineral Lake"			1:17
26.	"Lucky"			1:08
27.	"Garden Central Station"			1:03
28.	"Full Purple"			2:03
29.	"Vivisteria"			2:34
30.	"Firish"			1:27
31.	"A Lonely Man Awash in Sadness"			0:53
32.	"Firetown Flood"			2:35
33.	"You Were the Dream"			3:52
34.	"Make Connection"			2:19
35.	"Bà Ksô (The Big Bow)"			1:08
36.	"Steal the Show"	Ari Leff and Thomas Newman (music); Ari Leff and Michael Matosic (lyric)	Lauv	3:11
37.	"Grand Redux"			2:14

== Additional music ==
The track "Hell n Back" by Bakar was featured in the first trailer of the film, and "High Five" by Astral was featured in the second trailer. The track "Hot n Cold" by Katy Perry was also featured in some TV Spots for the film. The tracks were used for promotional purposes, and was neither featured in the soundtrack, nor in the film. Although it was not included from the soundtrack, the song "Kernkraft 400" (credited as "Kernkraft 400 - Sport Chant Stadium Remix") from Zombie Nation plays during the airball game at Cyclone Stadium. Sohn had suggested using the song which is a fixture at sporting events around the world because Gale Cumulus does not have a cue or motif.

== Reception ==
Qualbert praise for incorporating many elements of Indian music, saying "Does the soundtrack steal the show? Well, with Thomas Newman (Finding Nemo, WALL-E) as composer, it might just be my highlight of the film. His score is as beautiful and full of warmth as the flame elements that it represents, with much of the music taking a distinctly Indian tone. Sitar and Tabla are key instruments throughout the soundtrack, representing Ember and her family, and can even be heard alongside Konnakol (Indian vocal percussion)." Matt Neglia of Next Best Picture stated: "Thomas Newman's soothing score is magnificent and easily the best he's composed yet for a Pixar film, as it incorporates many cultural influences from eastern countries (but never anything too specific so as not to stereotype the Lumen family) to create a soundscape that is playfully cordial and appealing." He also praised original song, stating: "The song 'Steal the Show' by Lauv, which plays during Wade and Ember's first date, is a winning track that should enjoy some decent radio play and also aids in giving the film its feel-good vibe."

== Accolades ==
In December 2023, the score was shortlisted for Best Original Score at the 96th Academy Awards.

Accolades received by Elemental
Award	Date of ceremony	Category	Recipient(s)	Result	Ref.
Hollywood Music in Media Awards	November 15, 2023	Best Original Score — Animated Film	Thomas Newman	Nominated	
Hollywood Music in Media Awards	November 15, 2023	Best Original Song — Animated Film	"Steal The Show" — Lauv, Michael Matosic, and Thomas Newman	Nominated	
Astra Film and Creative Arts Awards	January 6, 2024	Best Score	Thomas Newman	Nominated	
Annie Awards	February 17, 2024	Outstanding Achievement for Music in an Animated Feature Production	Thomas Newman, Lauv	Nominated	
