= Truth or Dare (2017 film) =

2017 horror film by Nick Simon

- Promotional poster
- Written by: Thommy Hutson; Ethan Lawrence
- Directed by: Nick Simon
- Starring: Cassie Scerbo; Brytni Sarpy; Mason Dye; Harvey Guillen; Luke Baines; Ricardo Hoyos; Alexxis Lemire; Christina Masterson; Heather Langenkamp
- Music by: Nima Fakhrara
- Country of origin: United States
- Original language: English

Production
- Executive producer: Paul Hertzberg
- Producers: Lisa M. Hansen; Lisa Riley; Brian Tidmore; German Michael Torres
- Cinematography: Kevin Duggin
- Editor: Don Money
- Production companies: CineTel Films; Angel Cake Truth

Original release
- Network: Syfy
- Release: October 8, 2017

Truth or Dare is a 2017 American supernatural horror television film directed by Nick Simon and written by Thommy Hutson and Ethan Lawrence. The film stars Cassie Scerbo, Brytni Sarpy, Mason Dye, Harvey Guillen, Luke Baines, Ricardo Hoyos, Alexxis Lemire, Christina Masterson as eight teenagers forced to play a deadly game of truth or dare by a vengeful spirit, and Heather Langenkamp as a survivor of the game from decades earlier. The film premiered on Syfy on October 8, 2017. It received negative reviews from critics.

The plot focuses on a group of eight college students who rent a house on Halloween that is said to be haunted after a deadly game of truth or dare many years beforehand. The group decide to play the game and are forced to follow through in answering humiliating truths honestly, act upon increasingly alarming dares asking them to do violent things to themselves or others, or face deadly consequences.

== Plot ==
A group of eight friends – Carter, Maddie, Tyler, Alex, Jessie, Addison, Holt, and Luke – go to a house Carter has rented for a Halloween outing. Carter tells the group that the house became haunted after seven teens played truth or dare in 1983. All but one died horribly, and the survivor disappeared. Carter persuades everyone to play the game. Maddie is asked if she had sex with Tyler, Alex's boyfriend, and although she tries to lie, a group text forces her to tell the truth. Tyler is dared to touch a hot stove and is told to 'do the dare or the dare does you'. He attempts to quit, but a chair moves by itself and trips him onto the stove, severely burning his hand.

The group accuses Carter of fabricating everything, which he denies. The group is warned they have 48 hours to complete three rounds of the game. Jessie, a vegan, is dared to eat Tyler's burnt skin from the stove, and Holt is dared to grab onto exposed wiring. To keep him from getting electrocuted, Carter rushes at him with a blanket to push him from the wires. Luke is dared to smash his knee, which Carter does for him. Addison is asked if she's an addict. She lies that she isn't, and then tries to leave the house. A mysterious force shoves her off the porch and onto an exposed pipe, killing her.

They go to the police, but are met with skepticism. The next day, Addison's ghost appears in Carter's dorm room and dares him to hang himself for two minutes. Carter tries to leave, but the ghost captures and hangs him. After being sent a livestream of the dare, Alex, Maddie, Tyler, and Holt race to Carter's room, but are unable to save him. The four friends see a message that Round Two is beginning. Meanwhile, Alex's research into the history of the house leads her to Donna Boone, the survivor of the 1983 incident. Donna tells them that they will have to finish the game inside the house to survive, and also suggests sharing their dares.

In his bedroom, Luke is dared to rob a gas station, and a gun appears on his bed. He attempts the robbery, but the cashier kills Luke with a shotgun. Shocked, Jessie calls Alex to tell her that Luke was shot during the robbery, and Alex tells her to meet back at the house. Once Jessie returns, the group heads inside, and Tyler is dared dare to drink a liquid poison. Sharing the dare, they all first drink soda, then drink the poison and vomit it up. Maddie is dared to remove two teeth; Tyler extracts one from her, and one from himself. Alex is dared to play three rounds of Russian roulette, with Alex surviving the first two and Tyler fatally shooting himself in the head on the third round.

Holt is dared to be run over by a car, and confesses to the others that he once paralyzed someone in a hit-and-run accident, but escaped without consequence. Jessie tries to run over Holt's foot, but the car won't start, and when Holt opens the hood to fix the starter, the hood slams on his hand. The driverless car runs him over, crushing him to death. Alex realizes that the game is punishing them for their obsessions and sins.

Jessie is dared to chain herself to a pipe in the cellar, but takes too long and is devoured by a swarm of cockroaches. As Round Three begins, Maddie is dared to remove seven living body parts. Sharing the dare, they remove an eyelash, hair, a fingernail, an earlobe, a finger, and a toe. As their last part, Alex chops off Maddie's foot with a cleaver. After completing the dare, they rush to the hospital, but a message appears on the car's GPS with Alex's final dare – "kill her". Maddie begs Alex to kill her, but Alex refuses, and intentionally crashes the car into a tree. An unknown survivor gasps for air after the screen cuts to black.

== Cast ==
- Cassie Scerbo as Alex Colshis
- Brytni Sarpy as Maddie Sotarez
- Mason Dye as Tyler Pemhart
- Harvey Guillen as Holt Thorne
- Luke Baines as Carter Boyle
- Ricardo Hoyos as Luke Wyler
- Alexxis Lemire as Jessie Havnell
- Christina Masterson as Addison Troy
- Heather Langenkamp as Donna Boone
  - Taylor Lyons as young Donna Boone
- Jonathan Mercedes as Johnny Milsner

== Casting ==
Scerbo was cast in the role of Alex after several auditions. She described the character as "smart, quick and driven."

=== Donna Boone ===
Heather Langenkamp, a longtime friend of the writer Thommy Hutson, was approached to portray the grown version of Donna. Langenkamp's first steps before filming were to get a life cast of her face for Donna's disfigurement, which she found to add a lot of depth to Donna. She later had discussions with Hutson to add further characterization to the character, deciding that she did jigsaw puzzles to deal with her overt loneliness.

== Release ==
The film premiered on Syfy on October 8, 2017.

As of August 2020, the film is estimated to have grossed $6,871 from DVD and Blu-ray sales.

== Reception ==
The film received negative reviews from critics. It has a 0% fresh rating on review aggregator Rotten Tomatoes, based on six reviews. Joey Keogh of Wicked Horror wrote that the film "is too safe to really commit to the darkness and instead leaves one wondering why it really needs to exist in the first place."

Timothy Rawles of iHorror argued that the film shouldn't be dismissed, praising its acting, direction, and special effects. "Truth or Dare is fun as soon as it reels you in and that's pretty much from the get-go," he wrote.
