= Alexxis Lemire =

American actress

- Born: May 30, 1996 (age 30); Londonderry, New Hampshire
- Occupation: Actress
- Years active: 2016–present
- Spouse: Alex Wassabi (m. 2025)

Alexxis Lemire (born May 30, 1996) is an American actress. She is known for her roles as Jesse Havnell in the 2017 Syfy horror television film Truth or Dare, as Kate Miller in the 2018 Lifetime thriller television film The Art of Murder, and as Aster Flores in the 2020 Netflix original movie The Half of It.

== Early life and career ==
Lemire was born in Londonderry, New Hampshire to a Puerto Rican mother and a French father. Of her heritage, Lemire has said "Sometimes people put the pressure on to choose what side I am. Being in this industry and going to castings, sometimes I'm too Latin for a Caucasian role, or not Latin enough. That's a struggle I continue to face." Lemire has one half-brother.

After graduating from Londonderry High School in 2014 where she participated in the school's cheer team, Lemire moved with her mother to Los Angeles to pursue her acting career, saying of the decision, “I felt like acting was the only way I was able to express myself. I could step into these other roles and understand a little more about empathy.” Aside from her acting career, Lemire is also a professional model.

In 2017, Lemire starred in Truth or Dare, a Syfy channel horror movie. In 2018, Lemire was cast in Netflix's The Half of It, an LGBT coming-of-age comedy-drama film written and directed by Alice Wu, which was released in May 2020.

Lemire began a relationship with YouTuber, Alex Wassabi, in 2022. They became engaged August 2025.

== Filmography ==
Television and film roles
Year	Title	Role	Notes
2016	Lab Rats: Elite Force	Scarlett Double	2 episodes
2017	The Other Mother	Taylor	Television film (Lifetime)
2017	Truth or Dare	Jesse Havnell	Television film (Syfy)
2018	The Art of Murder	Kate Miller	Television film (Lifetime)
2020	The Half of It	Aster Flores	Direct-to-streaming film
2021	Cerebrum	Chloe McPherson	Film
2022	Torn Hearts	Leigh Blackhouse	Direct-to-streaming film
