= Daniel Diemer =

Canadian actor

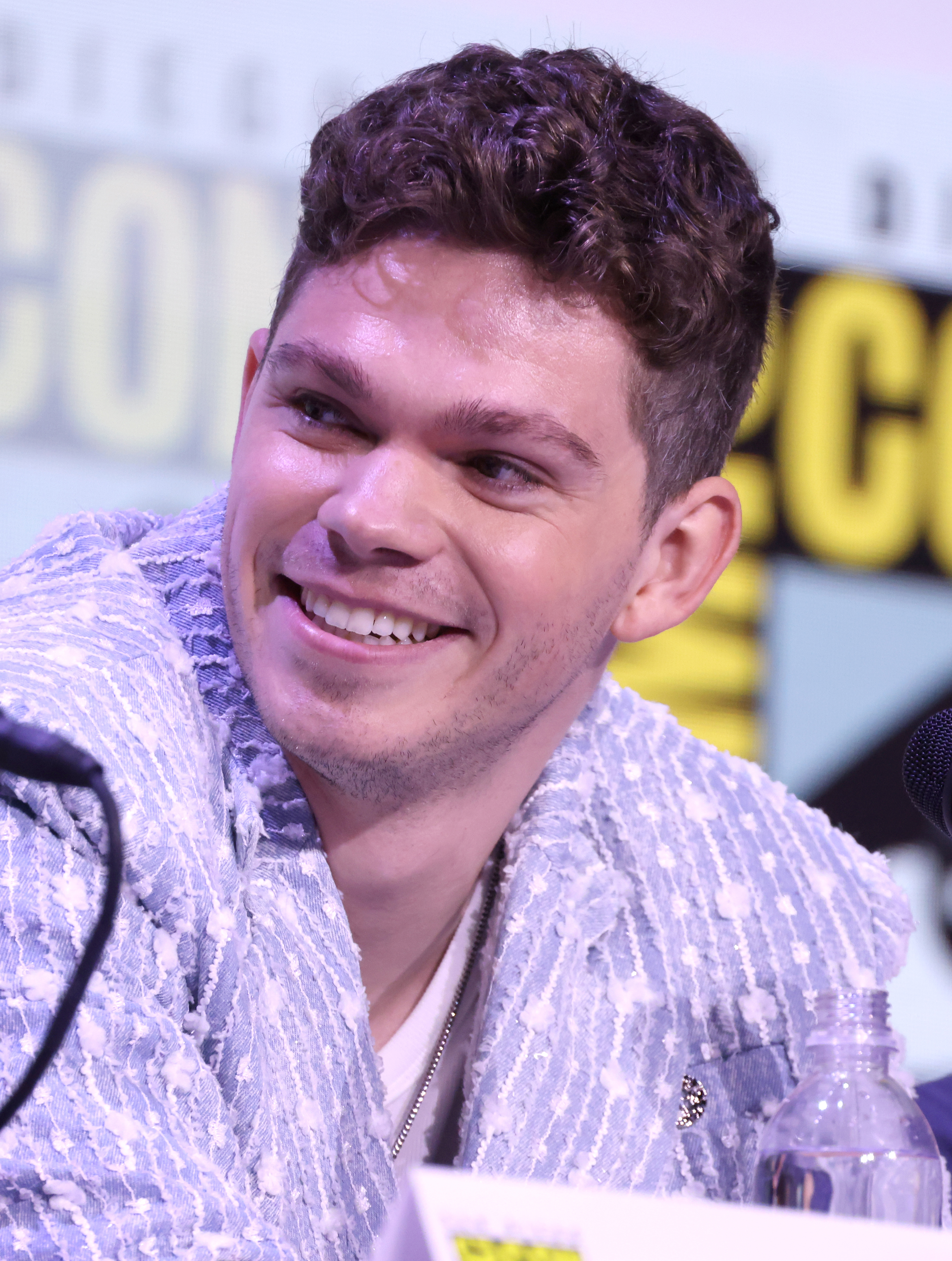
- Diemer in 2025
- Born: 21 June 1996 (age 30); Brentwood Bay, British Columbia, Canada
- Education: Camosun College
- Occupation: Actor
- Years active: 2014–present

Daniel Diemer (born 21 June 1996) is a Canadian actor, best known for his roles as Paul in the Netflix film The Half of It and Tyson in the Disney+ series Percy Jackson and the Olympians. Prior to that, he played smaller roles in The Man in the High Castle and Sacred Lies. In 2027, he will play Ryan Price in season 2 of the Crave series Heated Rivalry.

== Early life ==
Diemer was born in Brentwood Bay, British Columbia. His father is a tennis coach, and he has a brother named Aaron.

At the age of 5, he started playing soccer and intended to become an athlete professionally, but his sudden growth spurt impeded his speed. He turned to tennis instead before a back injury forced him out of an athletic career. He then entered pre-medical classes at Camosun College. He took time off after a semester and started modeling for an art class. He was then living in Vancouver and attending acting masterclasses. He graduated from the Victoria Academy of Dramatic Arts in 2016.

== Career ==
Diemer's first screen role was in a Sidney York music video in 2014. After that, he enrolled in the Victoria Academy of Dramatic Arts, studying film and TV acting. He didn't book any roles in his first two years of auditions. He then got a role in the 2016 movie Bloody Blacksmith, and acted in four short films between 2017 and 2018.

In 2018, Diemer played a recurring character in the TV series Sacred Lies for four seasons. He then starred in Emma Fielding: More Bitter Than Death and Family Pictures. He played a role in the Amazon Prime Video historical drama The Man in the High Castle.

=== The Half of It (2020) ===
Diemer played a lead role in Alice Wu's coming-of-age movie The Half of It, which was distributed by Netflix and premiered on 1 May 2020. He played Paul Munsky, a clumsy football player who asks the protagonist, Ellie Chu, to help him woo a girl they both have a crush on by writing her letters. Wu held over 600 auditions for the part before discovering Diemer.

The movie received favorable reviews, and won Best Narrative Feature at the 2020 Tribeca Festival.

=== Percy Jackson and the Olympians (2025) ===
Diemer appears in season two of Disney+'s Percy Jackson and the Olympians, playing Tyson, the titular character's younger Cyclops half-brother.

== Filmography ==
=== Film ===
Year	Title	Role	Notes
2016	Bloody Blacksmith	Norris	
2020	The Half of It	Paul Munsky	
2022	Brazen	Rand Morgan	
2023	Supercell	William Brody	
2023	Little Brother	Jake	
2024	Absolution	Kyle Conner	
2026	In My Blood	Jack Merrifield	
2026	The Deputy	TBA	

=== Television ===
Year	Title	Role	Notes
2019	The Man in the High Castle	Kent	
2019	Family Pictures	Killington	Television film
2021	Black Summer	Luke	
2022	The Midnight Club	Bill/Rhett	
2024	Under the Bridge	Scott Bentland	
2024	The Old Man	Jason McDonald	Season 2, 1 episode
2025	Percy Jackson and the Olympians	Tyson	
2027	Heated Rivalry †	Ryan Price	Season 2
