= Merrell Twins =

American YouTube personalities (born 1996)

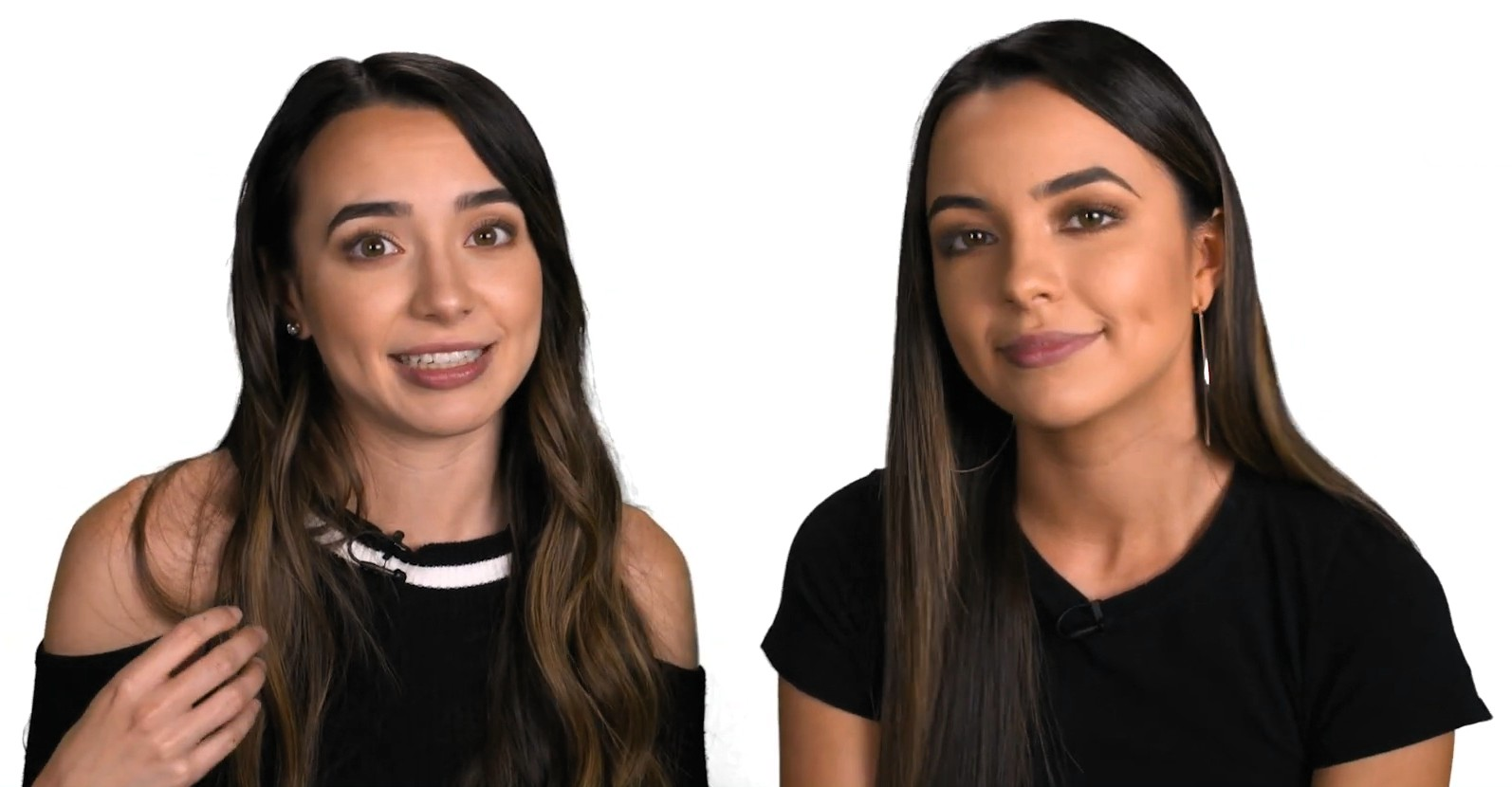
- Merrell Twins in 2018
- Born: Veronica Jo Merrell; Vanessa Jo Merrell; August 6, 1996 (age 30); Kansas City, Missouri, U.S.
- Occupations: YouTube personalities, actresses, producers, musicians, singers, songwriters
- Spouses: Veronica: Aaron Burriss (m. 2021); Vanessa: John Vaughn (m. 2023)
- Relatives: Veronica: Alex Burriss (brother-in-law)

YouTube information
- Channel: merrelltwins
- Years active: 2009–present
- Subscribers: 6.60 million
- Views: 2.42 billion
- Last updated: 27 October 2026
- Website: merrelltwins.com

Veronica Jo Merrell-Burriss and Vanessa Jo Merrell (born August 6, 1996), known as the Merrell Twins, are American identical twin YouTubers, actresses, producers, musicians, singers, and songwriters.

== Early years ==
The Merrell Twins are identical twin sisters born in Kansas City, Missouri, on August 6, 1996, to Paul Merrell; a musician, one time youth pastor and video editor/producer/director, and Wendy Merrell; a former school administrator. Veronica "Roni" is 45 minutes older than Vanessa "Nessa". They grew up in Kansas City, and moved to Los Angeles in June 2013 after signing what ended up being an unsuccessful deal with the Disney Channel.

== Education ==
In 2015, the Merrell Twins enrolled in California State University, Northridge; Veronica studied screenwriting and Vanessa studied TV production. Both dropped out due to travel schedule conflicts.

== Career ==
The Merrell Twins launched their main YouTube channel in late 2009, but didn't begin uploading videos consistently until around 2013. Their videos are produced and edited by their father. They often appear in AwesomenessTV videos and had recurring roles on the television show Jane the Virgin. They appeared in the 2016 film The Standoff. In 2016 at the 8th Shorty Awards, they won YouNower of the Year.

They won a Streamy Award for Best Live Social Media in 2016. In 2017, they were nominated for Choice Female Web Star at the Teen Choice Awards. In 2018, they were nominated for two Teen Choice Awards: Choice Female Web Star and Choice YouTuber. They won the 2018 Streamy Award in the Lifestyle category.

In July 2018, the Merrell Twins released their clothing line, True IMG. The phrase "true image" is derived from the meaning of Veronica's name in Latin, while the butterfly in the logo refers to the meaning of Vanessa's name in Greek.

They were nominated in 2019 for Best YouTube Ensemble at the 11th Shorty Awards. At the 2020 Kids' Choice Awards, they were nominated for Favorite Female Social Star.

In collaboration with AwesomenessTV, the twins launched Twin My Heart, a reality TV show aimed at finding love for Vanessa. The success of season one led to a second season being released in 2020 which revolved around two of the twins' best friends, Franny Arrieta and Nezza. The show was renewed for a third season the following year, revolving around TikTok star Nate Wyatt. They also produced and acted in three web shows called "Where is My Romeo?", "Prom Knight", and "Breaking into College".

In the beginning of 2023, Vanessa and her husband John Vaughn formed the music duo ButterflyTiger and released their debut single, "Love Me (Like You Do)" on February 24, 2023.

== Personal lives ==
On December 27, 2021, Veronica married YouTuber Aaron Burriss and is the brother of YouTuber Alex Wassabi.

On January 27, 2023, Vanessa married musician John Vaughn.

The twins have stated in several videos that they are of Spanish, Portuguese, Irish, German and Mexican descent.

On August 27, 2026 Veronica and her husband announced that they are expecting their first child.

== Filmography ==
This filmography is of the twins as a duo.

Television and Film
Year(s)	Title	Veronica's role	Vanessa's role	Notes
2014–2016	Jane the Virgin	Victoria	Valeria	5 episodes
2015	Faking It	Willa	Ella	Episode: "Prom Scare"
2016	The Standoff	Mia	Maya	Direct-to-video film
2017	Hyperlinked	Missy	Chrissy	Episode: "The Interview"
2020	Like a Boss	Lola	Layla	
2024	Mean Girls	Social Media Friend	Social Media Friend	

This filmography is of Vanessa Merrell.

Film
Year(s)	Title	Role	Notes	Ref.
2020	Switched	Olivia		

== Awards and nominations ==
Year	Award Show	Category	Result	Refs
2016	Shorty Awards	YouNower of the Year	Won	
2016	Streamy Awards	Live	Won	
2017	Teen Choice Awards	Choice Female Web Star	Nominated	
2018	Teen Choice Awards	Choice Female Web Star	Nominated	
2018	Teen Choice Awards	Choice YouTuber	Nominated	
2018	Streamy Awards	Lifestyle	Won	
2019	Shorty Awards	Best YouTube Ensemble	Nominated	
2020	Kids' Choice Awards	Favorite Female Social Star	Nominated	
