= Absolution (2024 film) =

Film by Hans Petter Moland

- Theatrical release poster
- Directed by: Hans Petter Moland
- Written by: Tony Gayton
- Produced by: Warren Goz; Eric Gold; Roger Birnbaum; Michael Besman
- Starring: Liam Neeson; Ron Perlman; Yolonda Ross; Frankie Shaw; Daniel Diemer
- Cinematography: Philip Øgaard
- Edited by: Dino Jonsäter
- Music by: Kaspar Kaae
- Production companies: Sculptor Media; Electromagnetic Productions
- Distributed by: Samuel Goldwyn Films
- Release date: November 1, 2024
- Running time: 112 minutes
- Country: United States
- Language: English
- Box office: $4.2 million

Absolution is a 2024 American action thriller film directed by Hans Petter Moland, written by Tony Gayton, and starring Liam Neeson as a brooding, aging gangster.

Absolution was theatrically released on November 1, 2024 by Samuel Goldwyn Films, and received mixed reviews from critics.

== Plot ==
A retired ageing mobster and boxer known as Thug works for gangster Charlie Conner alongside the latter's son Kyle. Kyle is an amateur at the trade, and Thug is teaching him the tricks of the trade. Thug assists Kyle in deals involving transfer of goods, the details or whereabouts of which they are not supposed to know. Thug lives alone and is having memory problems and soon afterwards is diagnosed with CTE, with the bad news that he will suffer from dementia in 2 years.

Thug attempts suicide but stops when he sees a child watching him, and decides to live and atone for his sins. Thug then meets a lady at the bar known as Woman, and she befriends him and gives him company in his apartment. He tries to reconcile with his estranged son, and daughter Daisy, only to learn that his son died years back and Daisy still hates him and doesn't want to reconnect with him She believes her grandfather, father and even husband deserted the family in times of need and she is now a single parent to two kids.

Thug tries to visit her and befriends his grandson Dre despite a cold response from his daughter. He learns that Daisy has to relinquish the house she's staying in shortly as the owner wishes to sell it. He takes Dre to a boxing club and begins to teach him boxing.

On one assignment Kyle and Thug discover that they have transported Spanish women being trafficked to a brothel when one of them tries to reach out to him for help, before being taken away by thugs.

Thug has dreams of his father and grandfather telling him that they are to pay for their sins. He visits the brothel and finds the girl named Araceli who sought his help and learns about her helplessness and desire to leave, if she can be bought for a price. Hitmen try to kill Thug when he meets a priest - they extort money at Charlie's behest, but he kills them in return, before learning that the person who assigned them to kill him is further up the chain of command.

Thug takes Woman for dinner, hoping his family will join them, but he ends up over drinking and creating a scene. The next day Woman calls Daisy and Dre over to Thug's apartment but Thug gets angry and admonishes Woman in front of his daughter and grandson, after which she leaves infuriated. Daisy tells Thug she didn't know about his diagnosis and is willing to accept and accommodate him. Thug apologises to Daisy and Dre. Charlie and Kyle inform Thug that they have replaced him as he’s too old, and with dementia he cannot work for them anymore. It is also revealed that it was Kyle who arranged to assassinate Thug.

Thug overpowers them and shoots Kyle in the thigh and forces Charlie to give him all the money and weapons in his office, after which he kills Charlie. Thereafter Thug visits a real estate broker and gives him money to pay for Daisy's house purchase. He also visits Woman and leaves a part of the money in her apartment, and then visits the brothel hoping to buy Araceli but learns that she has been killed. An infuriated Thug orders the pimps to release all the girls held there and allows them to escape, but gets shot by one of them before killing him. One pimp tries to strangle Thug but is shot by one of the girls as she escapes.

Thug retires to his apartment as he watches the dawn break and dies.

== Cast ==
- Liam Neeson as Thug
- Yolonda Ross as Woman
- Daniel Diemer as Kyle Conner
- Javier Molina as Gamberro
- Frankie Shaw as Daisy
- Ron Perlman as Charlie Conner
- William Xifaras as Kiko
- Terrence Pulliam as Dre
- Josh Drennen as Thug's dad
- Ryan Homchick as Dr. Gruber
- Deanna Tarraza as Araceli
- Kris Eivers as Priest
- Ryan Caraway as Bartender
- Omar Moustafa Ghonim as Armando
- Tom Kemp as Burt
- Jimmy Gonzales as Diego Machado
- Bruce Soscia as Tommy
- Levon Panek as Huge Dude
- Ghia Truesdale as Charlie Conner's Wife (uncredited)

== Production ==
Filming occurred in Winthrop, Massachusetts in October 2022. Filming also occurred in Allston earlier that same month. Filming also took place in Norwood, Massachusetts in November 2022.

== Release ==
As of September 2024, the film was retitled Absolution and given a release date of November 1, 2024.

== Reception ==
=== Box office ===
In the United States and Canada, Absolution was released alongside Here and Hitpig!. The film debuted with $1.4 million from 1,500 theaters in its opening weekend, finishing 12th at the box office.

=== Critical response ===
On the review aggregator website Rotten Tomatoes, 56% of 63 critics' reviews are positive, with an average rating of 5.8/10. The website's consensus reads: "Liam Neeson's gruff performance redeems Absolution somewhat, this thriller's sluggish pacing may not fully earn audiences' forgiveness." Metacritic, which uses a weighted average, assigned the film a score of 51 out of 100, based on 12 critics, indicating "mixed or average" reviews.
