= Like a Boss (film) =

2020 film by Miguel Arteta

- Theatrical release poster
- Directed by: Miguel Arteta
- Screenplay by: Sam Pitman; Adam Cole-Kelly
- Story by: Sam Pitman; Adam Cole-Kelly; Danielle Sanchez-Witzel
- Produced by: Marc Evans; Peter Principato; Itay Reiss; Joel Zadak
- Starring: Tiffany Haddish; Rose Byrne; Jennifer Coolidge; Billy Porter; Salma Hayek
- Cinematography: Jas Shelton
- Edited by: Jay Deuby
- Music by: Christophe Beck; Jake Monaco
- Production company: Artists First
- Distributed by: Paramount Pictures
- Release dates: January 7, 2020 (New York City); January 10, 2020 (United States)
- Running time: 83 minutes
- Country: United States
- Language: English
- Budget: $29 million
- Box office: $30.4 million

Like a Boss is a 2020 American comedy film directed by Miguel Arteta, written by Sam Pitman and Adam Cole-Kelly, and starring Tiffany Haddish, Rose Byrne, and Salma Hayek.

The plot follows two lifelong friends who fight to take back control of their cosmetics company from an industry titan.

The film was theatrically released in the United States on January 10, 2020, by Paramount Pictures. It received negative reviews from critics, though the cast received praise.

== Plot ==
Lifelong best friends Mia and Mel, who have very different personalities, share a house and run their own beauty company, Mia&Mel. Mia is creative, while Mel is the organised one who keeps the books and tries to keep everything running smoothly, while keeping secret their massive debt.

Going together to an old classmate's baby shower, the pair are awestruck by everyone else's wealth. As most everyone there are starting families and having babies, the pair are asked when they are going to join in, they say the company is their baby. Frustrated after a woman brags about her daughter's particularly lucrative business deal, Mia and Mel sneak off to smoke a joint, inadvertently exposing an infant to the smoke.

Mia has a casual, purely physical regular hookup with a much younger man. Mel, on the other hand, has a hookup she turns away as soon as he gets up. On their way to work, Mel contemplates their continued single lifestyles, wondering if they should be concerned, which Mia brushes aside.

When Claire Luna, Head of major cosmetics empire Oviedo, contacts Mia&Mel after seeing their 'One Night Stand', single use makeup kit to invest in them, Mia is not interested. However, Mel reveals they are in debt almost half a million dollars, so they meet. Mia is suspicious of Claire's motives, and rightly so, as she intends to steal the business out from under them.

The two must address their differences to save their business, as they are faced with the challenge of proving themselves to Luna even as she steals their 'one-night-stand' bag idea and has it marketed through one of her other companies, as well as forcing them to fire one of their workers, Barrett, leaving fellow staffer Sydney as their sole employee.

Mia and Mel briefly 'split up' through their different approaches to Luna's offer, but they reconcile when their friends help them face how they need each other. Faced with the possible loss of their business, Mia and Mel approach Shay, Luna's former business partner, to start a new company, Proud Cosmetics, marketing their new 'Ride or Die' product, make-up intended to be used by best friends together to face their nights out.

With this loophole, Mia and Mel can produce and market 'Ride or Die' under the 'Proud' banner while Luna takes ownership of Mia&Mel while still being required to pay them 49% of all subsequent earnings. Mia and Mel also bring along Sydney and Barrett to the new company.

== Cast ==
- Tiffany Haddish as Mia Carter, a co-owner of Mel & Mia's, with a brash personality.
- Rose Byrne as Mel Paige, a co-owner of Mel & Mia's, who is more business-savvy, but lacks the confidence of her partner.
- Salma Hayek as Claire Luna, a cosmetics mogul who obtains a controlling share of Mel & Mia's while bailing out the owners. She plans to steal their innovative new product ideas for herself.
- Jennifer Coolidge as Sydney, Mel and Mia's employee
- Billy Porter as Barrett, Mel and Mia's employee
- Karan Soni as Josh Tinker, Claire's right-hand man
- Natasha Rothwell as Jill, Mel and Mia's friend
- Jessica St. Clair as Kim, Mel and Mia's friend
- Ari Graynor as Angela, Mel and Mia's friend
- Jimmy O. Yang as Ron
- Ryan Hansen as Greg
- Jacob Latimore as Harry
- Lisa Kudrow as Shay Whitmore
- Veronica Merrell as Lola
- Vanessa Merrell as Layla
- Caroline Arapoglou as Brook

== Production ==
On October 23, 2017, it was announced that Paramount Pictures had bought a female-centered comedy spec, Limited Partners, specifically as a starring role for Tiffany Haddish. The film was written by Sam Pitman & Adam Cole-Kelly, from a story by the two, and Danielle Sanchez-Witzel, and was produced by Peter Principato, Itay Reiss, and Joel Zadak through their Principato-Young Entertainment. In July 2018, Paramount set Miguel Arteta as director. Later the same month, Rose Byrne was cast as the film's other lead. In September 2018, Salma Hayek was added to play the villain. In October 2018, Ari Graynor, Jacob Latimore, Karan Soni, Jimmy O. Yang, Natasha Rothwell, Jessica St. Clair and Billy Porter also joined the cast of the film.

Principal photography on the film began in October 2018. In July 2019, the film was re-titled Like a Boss.

== Release ==
Like a Boss was released on January 10, 2020, by Paramount Pictures. It was previously scheduled for June 28, 2019.

== Reception ==
=== Box office ===
Like a Boss grossed $22.2 million in the United States and Canada, and $7.5 million in other territories, for a worldwide total of $29.7 million.

In the United States and Canada, the film was released alongside Underwater and the expansions of Just Mercy and 1917, and was projected to gross $10–12 million from 3,078 theaters in its opening weekend. The film made $3.9 million on its first day of release, including $1 million from Thursday night previews. It went on to debut to $10 million, finishing fifth at the box office. The film fell 60% in its second weekend to $4 million (and $4.7 million over the four-day Martin Luther King Jr. Day holiday), finishing ninth.

=== Critical response ===
On review aggregator website Rotten Tomatoes, the film holds an approval rating of 21% based on 155 reviews, with an average rating of 4.1/10. The site's critics consensus reads, "Like a Boss oversees a merger of powerful comedic talents, but the end results are likely to leave audience members feeling swindled out of their investments." On Metacritic, the film has a weighted average score of 33 out of 100 based on 31 critics, indicating "generally unfavorable" reviews. Audiences polled by CinemaScore gave the film an average grade of "B" on an A+ to F scale, and PostTrak reported viewers gave it an average 3 out of 5 stars.

Rolling Stone's Peter Travers gave the film 1 out of 5 stars and wrote, "What we have here is a comedy on life support, with Haddish and Byrne valiantly performing futile acts of resuscitation. Sorry to report: The patient died."
