= Torn Hearts =

2022 American film by Brea Grant

- Directed by: Brea Grant
- Written by: Rachel Koller Croft
- Produced by: Paige Pemberton; Paul Uddo
- Starring: Katey Sagal; Abby Quinn; Alexxis Lemire; Joshua Leonard; Shiloh Fernandez
- Cinematography: Yaron Levy
- Edited by: Hunter M. Via
- Music by: Brittany Allen
- Production companies: Blumhouse Television; Epix
- Distributed by: Paramount Home Entertainment
- Release date: May 20, 2022
- Running time: 97 minutes
- Country: United States
- Language: English

Torn Hearts is a 2022 American horror film directed by Brea Grant and written by Rachel Koller Croft. The film stars Katey Sagal, Abby Quinn, Alexxis Lemire, Joshua Leonard and Shiloh Fernandez. Jason Blum serves as an executive producer for Blumhouse Television.

The film was released digitally on May 20, 2022 by Epix and Paramount Home Entertainment.

== Plot ==
Singer Leigh (Alexxis Lemire) and songwriter Jordan (Abby Quinn) constitute the Nashville band “Torn Hearts.” On the rise, they are looking for a break on the tour of a famed country singer, Caleb Crawford (Shiloh Fernandez). After Jordan hooks up with Crawford, he tells her that the tour is “all-guys.” With this chance gone, Jordan talks Leigh into approaching their idol, Harper Dutch (Katey Sagal), of the Dutch Sisters, whose address Jordan got from Caleb, and recording a song with her.

After reaching the old and worn-out Dutch manor, Leigh and Jordan receive an odd welcome from Harper. Her sister Hope (the other half of their band, the Dutch Sisters), committed suicide, after which Harper left singing.

Harper is able to spark a fight between Leigh and Jordan by poking at their difference of opinions. Leigh even admits to Harper that she “picked” Jordan after “four or five” girls. Jordan shoots and kills Harper in self defense. Harper plants an idea inside Leigh’s head that with Jordan dead, Leigh would also have a tragic story to tell the world that would make more people listen to their songs. Before Leigh can leave the Dutch manor, a fatally wounded Jordan shoots Leigh, and they both die.

== Cast ==
- Katey Sagal as Harper Dutch
- Abby Quinn as Jordan Wilder
- Alexxis Lemire as Leigh Blackhouse
- Joshua Leonard as Richie Rowley Jones
- Shiloh Fernandez as Caleb Crawford

== Production ==
In July 2021, Torn Hearts was announced as part of Blumhouse Television and Epix's TV movie deal.

== Release ==
The film was released digitally in the United States by Epix and Paramount Home Entertainment on May 20, 2022.

== Reception ==
=== Critical response ===
On the review aggregator website Rotten Tomatoes, 89% of 28 critics' reviews are positive, with an average rating of 7.10/10. Metacritic assigned the film a weighted average score of 59 out of 100, based on 5 critics, indicating "mixed or average reviews".
