= Steal the Show =

2023 song by Lauv

"Steal The Show"

Single by Lauv

from the album Elemental (Original Motion Picture Soundtrack)
- Released: June 2, 2023
- Genre: World music
- Length: 3:11
- Label: Walt Disney
- Composers: Ari Leff; Thomas Newman
- Lyricists: Ari Leff; Michael Matosic
- Producers: Lauv; Thomas Newman

Lauv singles chronology
"Kids Are Born Stars" (2022)	"Steal The Show" (2023)	"Love U Like That" (2023)

Music video
- "Steal The Show" on YouTube

"Steal The Show" is a song by American singer-songwriter Lauv, from the soundtrack to Pixar's 2023 film Elemental. The film's composer Thomas Newman and Michael Matosic respectively handled the music and lyrics with Lauv. The song plays during the montage of the dates of Ember Lumen and Wade Ripple, two of the main characters, respectively, as well as the end credits. It was released on June 2, 2023 as a single, two weeks before the film's release.

== Background ==
On June 2, 2023, it was announced that Lauv performed the original song called "Steal the Show" that played during Ember and Wade's dates as well as end credits, which was released that day. Early in production, director Peter Sohn, who used one of Lauv's songs as a placeholder, stated "we finally got the chance to work with him, I referenced his music and how we were using it. He captured the beauty [Ember and Wade] saw in each other and how it could be something more. We were so emotional when we first heard his song. It was overwhelming and we feel absolutely indebted to what he gave the film." On writing the song, Lauv sat down with Thomas Newman, who gave him a couple of sounds that he was working with.

== Music video ==
On June 1, 2023, an official audio video of the song was released. On July 1, 2023, the official music video of the song was released.

== Reception ==
Tom Jorgensen of Next Best Picture praised the original song, stating: "The song 'Steal The Show' by Lauv, which plays during Wade and Ember's first date, is a winning track that should enjoy some decent radio play and also aids in giving the film its feel-good vibe."

== Charts ==
=== Weekly charts ===
Weekly chart performance for "Steal the Show"
Chart (2023)	Peak position
Global 200 (Billboard)	163
New Zealand Hot Singles (RMNZ)	37
South Korea (Circle)	7
UK Singles Downloads (Official Charts)	39
UK Singles Sales (OCC)	41
US Digital Song Sales (Billboard)	24

=== Monthly charts ===
Monthly chart performance for "Steal the Show"
Chart (2023)	Position
South Korea (Circle)	11

=== Year-end charts ===
2023 year-end chart performance for "Steal the Show"
Chart (2023)	Position
South Korea (Circle)	44

2024 year-end chart performance for "Steal the Show"
Chart (2024)	Position
South Korea (Circle)	92

== Certifications ==
Certifications for "Steal the Show"
Region	Certification	Certified units/sales
Brazil (Pro-Música Brasil)	Gold	20,000^{‡}
United States (RIAA)	Gold	500,000^{‡}
^{‡} Sales+streaming figures based on certification alone.
