= Little Brother (2023 film) =

- Directed by: Sheridan O'Donnell
- Written by: Sheridan O'Donnell
- Produced by: Dylan Matlock; JP Ouellette; Chris Dodds; Mary Haarmeyer; Keagan Karnes; Sheridan O’Donnell; Brent Morris
- Starring: Daniel Diemer; Philip Ettinger; J.K. Simmons
- Cinematography: Conor Murphy
- Edited by: Mike Selemon
- Music by: Matthew Compton
- Production companies: Circa 1888; Made By Limbo; 19 Twelve Films
- Release date: April 23, 2023 (Atlanta)
- Country: United States
- Language: English

Little Brother is a 2023 American drama film written and directed by Sheridan O'Donnell and starring Daniel Diemer, Philip Ettinger and J.K. Simmons.

== Cast ==
- Daniel Diemer as Jake
- Philip Ettinger as Pete
- J.K. Simmons as Warren Duffy
- Polly Draper as Gail Duffy
- Nicole Starrett as Alice
- Natsuko Ohama as Mary

== Release ==
The film premiered at the Atlanta Film Festival on April 23, 2023.
