= Alex Wassabi =

American YouTuber (born 1990)

- Born: Alexander Burriss; March 28, 1990 (age 36); Great Falls, Montana, U.S.
- Spouse: Alexxis Lemire (m. 2025)
- Partner: Lauren Riihimaki (2015-2018)
- Relatives: Veronica Jo Merrell-Burriss (sister-in-law)

YouTube information
- Channel: Alex Wassabi
- Years active: 2006–present
- Genres: Vlogs; challenge
- Subscribers: 11.3 million
- Views: 4.76 billion
- Last updated: September 9, 2026

Alexander Burriss (born March 28, 1990), better known as Alex Wassabi, is an American YouTuber and professional boxer best known for being a part of the duo Wassabi Productions with Roi Fabito (known online as Guava Juice).

== Early life ==
Alexander Burriss was born on March 28, 1990, in Great Falls, Montana. His mother is Filipino and his father is British. He has two brothers, Aaron and Andrew, and a sister, Mariah. Aaron, his older brother, has a YouTube channel previously called Lazyron Studios. When he was one, Burriss's family moved to Lexington, Kentucky, and lived there for several years before moving to Durham, North Carolina when he was in fifth grade. He met friend and future collaborator Roi Fabito, also known as Guava Juice, there. They and their friends started making videos together in 2005. The name "Wassabi" came from a misspelling when Burriss was creating a Starcraft account. Burriss played in a basketball league when he was growing up.

== Career ==
Burriss and Fabito continued making videos throughout high school, even after their friends lost interest. Many of their videos were skits with recurring characters. They broke into the mainstream with their parody of "Call Me Maybe" in 2012, which went viral. Following the success, they moved to Los Angeles to pursue YouTube full-time, posting videos every Wednesday.

Fabito left the channel in January 2016, after both decided that they would rather focus on their own videos instead of working together all of the time. Burriss assumed full control of the channel as Fabito started his own channel, Guava Juice, although they still made appearances on each other's channels. Burriss took an extended break from YouTube in 2021, after not taking any breaks from the channel longer than a week for 15 years.

Burriss boxed influencer Deji Olatunji in March 2022 and won the fight. He was set to go against KSI in August of that year as well, but an injury caused him to be replaced by rapper Swarmz. In 2023, he defeated iDubbbz at Creator Clash 2, as the main event.

== Personal life ==
Burriss was diagnosed with ADHD in middle school. He dated fellow YouTuber Lauren Riihimaki, also known as LaurDIY; from 2015 to 2018. He subsequently started dating Alexxis Lemire in 2022, they got engaged in 2025. His brother Aaron married YouTuber Veronica Jo Merrell.

== Boxing record ==
=== Professional ===
1 fight	1 win	0 losses
By decision	1	0

No.	Result	Record	Opponent	Type	Round, time	Date	Location	Notes
1	Win	1–0	iDubbbz	MD	4	Apr 15, 2023	Amalie Arena, Tampa, Florida, U.S.	

=== Exhibition ===
1 fight	1 win	0 losses
By decision	1	0

No.	Result	Record	Opponent	Type	Round, time	Date	Location	Notes
1	Win	1–0	Deji Olatunji	SD	5	5 Mar 2022	Wembley Arena, London, England	

=== Tag Team ===
1 fight	0 wins	0 losses
Draws	1	

No.	Result	Record	Team	Opponents	Type	Round, time	Date	Location	Notes
1	Draw	0–0–1	Wassabi Lmao (with NichLmao)	Los Pineda Coladas (Luis Alcaraz Pineda & BDave)	SD	4	Oct 14, 2023	Manchester Arena, Manchester, England	

== Awards and nominations ==
Year	Award	Category	Result	Ref.
2018	Kids' Choice Awards	Favorite Funny YouTube Creator	Nominated	
2018	Shorty Awards	Vlogger of the Year	Nominated	
2018	Streamy Awards	First Person	Nominated	
