= Elemental (2023 film) =

2023 film by Peter Sohn

- Theatrical release poster
- Directed by: Peter Sohn
- Screenplay by: John Hoberg Kat Likkel; Brenda Hsueh
- Story by: Peter Sohn; John Hoberg; Kat Likkel; Brenda Hsueh
- Produced by: Denise Ream
- Starring: Leah Lewis; Mamoudou Athie; Ronnie del Carmen; Shila Ommi; Wendi McLendon-Covey; Catherine O'Hara
- Cinematography: David Bianchi; Jean-Claude Kalache
- Edited by: Stephen Schaffer
- Music by: Thomas Newman
- Production company: Pixar Animation Studios
- Distributed by: Walt Disney Studios; Motion Pictures (Note: Distributed under the Walt Disney Pictures banner.)
- Release dates: May 27, 2023 (Cannes); June 16, 2023 (United States)
- Running time: 101 minutes
- Country: United States
- Language: English
- Budget: $200 million
- Box office: $496.4 million

Elemental is a 2023 American animated romantic comedy-drama film directed by Peter Sohn, and written by John Hoberg, Kat Likkel, and Brenda Hsueh. Produced by Pixar Animation Studios for Walt Disney Pictures, it stars the voices of Leah Lewis, Mamoudou Athie, Ronnie del Carmen, Shila Ommi, Wendi McLendon-Covey, and Catherine O'Hara. Set in a world inhabited by anthropomorphic elements of nature, the story follows fire element Ember Lumen (Lewis) and water element Wade Ripple (Athie), who spend time together in the city while trying to save a convenience store owned by Ember's father, Bernie (Del Carmen).

Development of Elemental began when Sohn pitched the concept to Pixar based on the idea of whether fire and water could ever connect or not. The film draws inspiration from Sohn's youth, growing up as the son of immigrants in New York City during the 1970s, highlighting the city's distinct cultural and ethnic diversity while the story is inspired by romantic films such as Guess Who's Coming to Dinner (1967), Moonstruck (1987), and Amélie (2001). The production team conducted research by spending many hours watching point-of-view city tours on YouTube like Venice and Amsterdam for inspiration. Animation tools were utilized to design the visual effects and appearance of each character, particularly its main characters. Production on Elemental lasted for seven years, both in the studio and at the filmmakers' homes, on an estimated $200 million budget. Thomas Newman composed the score, and Lauv wrote and performed the song "Steal the Show". The film is dedicated to Pixar animators Ralph Eggleston, Amber Martorelli, J. Garrett Sheldrew, and film editor Thomas Gonzales, all of whom died in 2022.

Elemental debuted out of competition as the closing film at the 76th Cannes Film Festival on May 27, 2023, and was released in the United States on June 16 in RealD 3D, 4DX, and Dolby Cinema formats. The film initially opened below projections and was ultimately considered by analysts to be a sleeper hit, grossing $496.4 million worldwide. It was nominated for several awards, including the Academy Award for Best Animated Feature and the Golden Globe Award for Best Animated Feature Film.

== Plot ==
Following a catastrophic storm, fire elements Bernie and Cinder Lumen immigrate from Fire Land to Element City where they face racism from other classical elements. After the birth of their daughter Ember, they set up their Blue Flame which represents their traditions and start their own convenience store called the Fireplace. Several years later, Bernie intends to retire and give the store to Ember once she can control her fiery temper. When Bernie allows Ember to run the store on her own during the day of a big sale, she becomes overwhelmed by the customers and rushes to the basement. Her fiery outburst breaks a water pipe, flooding the basement and summoning Wade Ripple, an emotional water element and city inspector, who notes the store's code violations. Despite Ember's attempts to stop him, Wade travels to City Hall and reluctantly files a report of his findings, which will lead to the Fireplace shutting down. Ember keeps this a secret from her parents, and does not tell them that she is the reason why the pipe burst.

Wade brings Ember to Cyclone Stadium to persuade his air element boss Gale Cumulus to reconsider the shutdown of her father's store. Wade mentions to Ember that he was searching for a leak in the city's canals before ending up at the Fireplace, and suggests to Gale that he and Ember can track the source of the leak from the store. Gale offers to forgive the violations as long as they find and seal the leak by the end of the week. While searching the canals, Ember and Wade discover a hole in a dam that allows wave runoff from ships to flood the city's plumbing, so they close the hole with sandbags. The two spend time together in the city and learn more about each other. Meanwhile, Cinder suspects that Ember is seeing someone. The sandbags eventually fail, so Ember melts the sand into glass to form a sturdier seal. Ember visits Wade's family at a luxury apartment, where she uses her fire to fix a broken glass pitcher, impressing Wade's mother Brook, who recommends her for a glass-making internship. While playing "the Crying Game", Wade makes Ember cry by admitting he has feelings for her. Gale calls Wade and approves Ember's glass seal, thus saving the Fireplace from closure. Ember then realizes that she does not want to take over the store. As Ember arrives home, Cinder spots the two of them together.

That night, Bernie announces to Ember and Cinder that he intends to retire and hand the Fireplace to Ember. The next evening, Wade takes Ember to Garden Central Station to see Vivisteria flowers, a species that can thrive in any environment, which she and Bernie were denied seeing in her childhood. With the station now flooded, Gale provides Ember with an air bubble for safety while Wade pushes her underwater through the station. Afterward, Ember and Wade realize that they are able to touch without harming each other and share a slow dance, but Ember remembers her duty to the Fireplace and her family's prejudice against water elements, and breaks up with Wade. While Ember is about to take over the Fireplace during a party, Wade appears and declares his love for her, while also accidentally revealing that she caused the broken pipe. Ember rejects Wade, though Cinder senses genuine love. Angry and disappointed, Bernie refuses to give Ember the store and calls off his retirement.

Soon after, the glass seal on the dam breaks and the Fire district floods. After saving the Blue Flame, Ember and Wade become trapped in the hearth of the Fireplace, causing Wade to evaporate from the enclosed heat. After the flood recedes, a grief-stricken Ember confesses to Bernie that she does not want to run the Fireplace and expresses her love for Wade. Realizing that Wade has condensed within the stone ceiling, Ember plays the Crying Game to get him to cry and drip back into his normal form. Ember and Wade embrace and share their first kiss.

Months later, Bernie has retired and the Fireplace is now run by friends of his. Ember and Wade, now a couple, leave Element City so that Ember can start her glass-making internship.

== Voice cast ==
- Leah Lewis as Ember Lumen, a tough, quick-witted fire element who works at her family's convenience store in Fire Town, but has trouble controlling her explosive temper. The filmmakers stated that it was essential for Ember to be "relatable and likable, not scary and terrifying". Lewis was chosen due to her role in The Half of It (2020).
  - Clara Lin Ding as "little kid" Ember
  - Reagan To as "big kid" Ember
- Mamoudou Athie as Wade Ripple, a sappy water element who works as a city inspector living in Element City. In terms of his density and movement, Wade is a lot heavier, and his body is more fluid and wavy than Ember's body is. The filmmakers stated that Wade is "very emotional and cries at the drop of a hat". Athie based his performance on his own ability to cry.
- Ronnie del Carmen as Bernie Lumen, Ember's father, Cinder's husband, and owner of their family's convenience store in Fire Town who plans to retire and pass the business down to Ember. He is distrustful of water elements.
- Shila Ommi as Cinder Lumen, Ember's mother and Bernie's wife who is also distrustful of water elements.
- Wendi McLendon-Covey as Gale Cumulus, an air element with a big personality and Wade's boss. Her surname is not included in the film's credits, but it is mentioned in the film by Fern.
- Catherine O'Hara as Brook Ripple, the mother of Wade, Alan and Lake and sister of Harold.
- Mason Wertheimer as Clod, a young earth element who has a crush on Ember. Wertheimer made his feature film debut following the mockumentary podcast series Past My Bedtime (2022).
- Ronobir Lahiri as Harold, Brook's brother and Wade and Alan's uncle.
- Wilma Bonet as Flarrietta, one of the customers at the Fireplace.
- Joe Pera as Fern Grouchwood, an overgrown earth element bureaucrat who works at City Hall. His surname is not included in the film's credits, but it is seen in the film on his desk nameplate.
- Matt Yang King as:
  - Alan Ripple, Wade and Lake's older brother and Eddy's husband.
  - Lutz, an airball player who plays for the Windbreakers at Cyclone Stadium.
  - earth pruner
- Jeff LaPensee as sparkler customer
- Ben Morris as Wood Immigration Official. His name tag reveals his name to be C. C. Stump.
- Jonathan Adams as Flarry, one of the customers at the Fireplace.
- Alex Kapp as:
  - customer
  - delivery person
  - earth landlord
- P.L. Brown as doorman

Although credited as "additional voices", other members of Wade's family appear in the film including the following:

- Innocent Onanovie Ekakitie as Marco and Polo Ripple, Wade's nephews.
- Krysta Gonzales as Eddy Ripple, Alan's wife and Wade and Lake's sister-in-law.
- Ava Kai Hauser as Lake Ripple, Wade and Alan's younger sibling and Ghibli's partner. Lake is Pixar's first non-binary character.
- Maya Aoki Tuttle as Ghibli, Lake's girlfriend.

Other additional voices in the film include Dylan Buccieri, Assaf Cohen, Jessica DiCicco, Terri Douglas, Karen Huie, Arif S. Kinchen, Austin Madison, Cole Massie, Scott Menville, Alisha Mullally, Fred Tatasciore, Kari Wahlgren, and Secunda Wood.

== Production ==
=== Development ===
Peter Sohn, who previously directed the short film Partly Cloudy (2009) and the feature film The Good Dinosaur (2015), pitched the concept of Elemental to Pixar based on the idea of whether fire and water could ever connect or not. Sohn also said the idea for the film was inspired by his experiences as the son of immigrants in New York City in the 1970s. In his words, "My parents emigrated from Korea in the early 1970s and built a bustling grocery store in the Bronx." He also stated: "We were among many families who ventured to a new land with hopes and dreams — all of us mixing into one big salad bowl of cultures, languages, and beautiful little neighborhoods. That's what led me to Elemental."

In an interview with The Hollywood Reporter, Sohn says the film's seven-year development period with Elemental is closely tied to his relationship with his family, and the idea first started following the release of The Good Dinosaur. He revealed that Ember was born in Element City, but grew up in a fire town, since the neighborhoods are split up. He said he was "quite emotional about getting the characters and the story out for sure." He also stated that Elemental "is about thanking your parents and understanding their sacrifices. My parents both passed away during the making of this thing. And so, it is hugely emotional, and I'm still processing a lot of it."

Sohn stated in an interview with Disney's official fan club D23, "The concept of the city itself started off with Ember." Further elaborating on this statement, he said, "We thought, 'What's the best city we can build to support Ember's journey of identity and belonging?' It started by thinking about a city that would be hard for fire, and so we based it off of water. The idea is that Water got to this area first, and then Earth came, so it became a delta. Then, they built a water infrastructure with water canals and elevated water channels everywhere, making it even tougher for Ember. Then, Air came in after that, and Fire was one of the last groups to come into the city." Ember and Wade have chemistry, despite the differences. When Sohn first pitched the story and started developing it, he asked himself, "What's fire?" Sohn eventually came to the conclusion of, "People can see it as a temper. People can see it as passion. As a practical thing, fire burns and sparks—but what does it mean to burn bright? There are all these ingredients to what we already perceive as fire, and that started to form Ember's personality. It's the same thing for Wade. Water can be transparent. What does that mean? He wears his emotions on his sleeve. He goes with the flow. That helped form these personalities that were already pretty opposite, and then we had to find that Venn diagram of where they overlapped. That's the hopeful magic. I hope people can buy into the sparks, the chemical reaction, that could form a relationship."

On May 16, 2022, Pixar announced a new film titled Elemental, with the anthropomorphic classical elements of fire, water, air, and earth as its central theme, with Sohn directing and Denise Ream producing. Sohn and Ream reunite after having previously worked together on The Good Dinosaur. On September 9, 2022, during the D23 Expo, Sohn, Ream, and Pete Docter presented a first look at the film. "Our story is based on the classic elements — fire, water, land, and air. Some elements mix with each other, and some don't," Sohn stated. "What if these elements were alive?" Shortly after the unfinished animation footage, a clip was screened, showing Ember and Wade on a date, walking through a park where Wade runs across water, sliding, and creating a rainbow.

Production of the film was completed on March 24, 2023, after the final frame was approved, and seven years were spent on it, both in the studio and at the filmmakers' homes. According to story artist Jason Katz, the team finished the story while working remotely from home. Sohn noted that he had tears in his eyes when the final frame was approved.

The film is dedicated to Pixar animators Ralph Eggleston, Amber Martorelli, J. Garrett Sheldrew, and film editor Thomas Gonzales, all of whom died in 2022. As a tribute to Eggleston, a sign reading "Eat at Ralph's - Two cents" can be seen in Element City.

=== Writing ===
Turning Red (2022) creative consultant Brenda Hsueh was hired to write the screenplay. Ultimately, John Hoberg, Kat Likkel and Hsueh received "screenplay by" credit, while Sohn, Hoberg, Likkel, and Hsueh received "story by" credit.

Sohn cited romantic films like Guess Who's Coming to Dinner (1967), Moonstruck (1987), You've Got Mail (1998), Amélie (2001), My Big Fat Greek Wedding (2002), and The Big Sick (2017) as particular influences when he enjoyed leaning into the rom-com as a storytelling genre. Sohn used to doodle the periodic table in high school as an early form of expression with the movie's genesis, saying: "There was this funny drawing that I remember discovering about like a fire and a water character, and that triggering a whole lot of different ideas, and I just couldn't stop drawing these new, little things."

David J. Peterson, who had constructed languages for Game of Thrones (2011–2019) and Dune (2021), co-created the "Firish" language.

At one point, Hoberg and Likkel suggested that the ending of the film depict Wade and Ember having had a baby made of steam, a concept they fought for, but ultimately did not include in early cuts of the film. This was to ensure a more solid ending for the two leads and so that audiences would have something to look forward to in a potential future installment.

=== Casting ===
On September 9, 2022, during the D23 Expo, Leah Lewis and Mamoudou Athie were revealed to have been cast in the leading voice roles of Ember and Wade, respectively. When the full-length trailer was released on March 28, 2023, more cast members, including Ronnie del Carmen, Shila Ommi, Wendi McLendon-Covey, Catherine O'Hara, Mason Wertheimer, and Joe Pera, were announced.

When designing Ember and Wade, Sohn knew that he wanted the characters' voices to reflect their elements: for Ember, a smoky voice, and Wade, a cooler one. Lewis was picked because of her role in The Half of It (2020). Sohn spoke on her performance in the 2020 feature, saying that "she could be hot-tempered, but still very appealing", and stated: "She had a vulnerability in her voice that also she could straddle with being so sincere and authentic." With Athie, it was his role in the 2019 miniseries Oh Jerome, No and his ability to cry that won over the director. Sohn described a cry he made at a point in the series as "sincere, but hilarious", and added, "Mamoudou has such a compassionate soul that when he was crying, you just went with him in it."

On May 30, 2023, MotoGP rider Francesco Bagnaia was announced to be voicing a character named Pecco, after his nickname. This is the fifth Pixar film to feature a motorsports figure voicing a character, after Charles Leclerc and Carlos Sainz Jr. in international dubs of Lightyear (2022), and numerous other NASCAR and Formula One drivers for the three films in the Cars franchise.

=== Inspiration ===
According to Variety, at the Disney Content Showcase in Singapore on November 30, 2022, Sohn says that some of the inspiration came from his real-life family and marriage. He showed a picture of him as a child with his parents, saying, "Maybe it's because when I was a kid, I really didn't appreciate or understand what it meant to be an immigrant, to come to the U.S., and all the hard work that they did to give my brother and me our lives. That was one big nugget that was just sitting with me. On the other side, I married someone that wasn't Korean, and there was a lot of culture clash with that in my world. And that brought to me to this idea of finding opposites. And the question of what if fire fell in love with water came. As an animator, what could be a fun world to play with… so the fire and water is one thing. But then tying that to culture clash, was part of that metaphor. And then in that world, all of a sudden this idea of sacrifice, and understanding what our parents had given started to make the soup of what this film is." He also talks about culture clash and diversity, "It has been the struggle of my life for sure understanding my place and what have I assimilated or my identity being a bifurcated identity. It's always been there, I assume that it'll be always a part of some amount of storytelling – having that kind of that diversity. Will it be a major thing? I don't know. But it's been a part of my life. And I love trying to reflect what the teams that we've worked with their lives and our lives into the work that we do."

Sohn also showed footage from the film at the Disney Content Showcase and stated that "The film is about our differences that bring us together, but it is a love story. Hopefully, the audiences will get a deeper understanding of the loss in their lives between the partners, the friends or family." Sohn stated that the portrayal of Element City was inspired by many earlier live-action films, such as Roman Holiday. When addressed about similarities, Sohn denied that Elemental is inspired by Avatar: The Last Airbender (2005–2008), despite their shared concept of personifying classical elements. Sohn stated: "No, it wasn't a touchstone, but I love the show. I saw it with my kids and it's great, but we're so different from it. There's no martial arts in our world. There's not anything like that. It's this city story with the romance, and this family drama. But I do appreciate the connection that people are making just 'cause they love that and hopefully they can love this, too." Sohn also stated:

Growing up, I always saw my parents a certain way, but then when I hit my 20s and got a real job versus working at my family shop, I saw them as people. That shift from parents to people affected me a great deal. All the stories they told me of their journey here I took for granted until I was like, 'Oh my God, they did this without speaking the language. They did this with no money. My dad was a hotdog cart guy and he made all this. I could never do that.' My empathy grew for them.

=== Animation and design ===
Element City was modeled after New York City as a series of immigrant neighborhoods composed of organic materials that would complement each element. An example would be Fire Town, which was constructed with ceramic, metal, and brick. Production designer Don Shank says "design ideas inspired new technology, which inspired new design." Sohn noted that he "went into more detail about how the design and tech process went for designing Ember and Wade". He believed personifying elements was a difficult challenge, although he stated that air was not nearly as difficult to portray as fire and water, having already personified clouds in Partly Cloudy. The character Wade is incredibly complex, with the biggest challenge being his transparency through creating visual effects. In order to make him transparent enough, the animators needed to find some middle ground for how to create the character.

The set designers at the studio looked to cities like Venice and Amsterdam for inspiration. The water canals and the buildings that surround cities have immense detail and thought put into them. Due to the COVID-19 pandemic during which most of the production took place, the production team of the film was unable to travel to these cities for research, so they spent many hours watching point-of-view city tours on YouTube to get inspiration for Element City. To feel less like an alien version of real-world cities, production designer Don Shank and his team brainstormed the evolution of elemental beings and their civilization.

For Elemental, over 151,000 cores were used across three large rooms on the Pixar campus—a significant increase in computing power compared to previous Pixar films. This required Pixar to upgrade and purchase additional computers for the film. For context, Toy Story (1995) employed 294 cores, Monsters, Inc. (2001) employed 672 cores, and Finding Nemo (2003) employed 923 cores.

== Music ==
On February 7, 2023, Thomas Newman was confirmed to compose and conduct the original score for Elemental. It marks Newman's fourth collaboration with the studio following Finding Nemo (2003), WALL-E (2008), and Finding Dory (2016), as well as his first Pixar film not to be directed by Andrew Stanton. Lauv performed the original song "Steal the Show" that plays during Ember and Wade's dates as well as the end credits, which was released as a single on June 2, 2023, two weeks before the film's theatrical release.

== Release ==
Elemental debuted out of competition as the closing film at the 76th Cannes Film Festival on May 27, 2023, followed by a worldwide premiere on June 10, 2023, at Tribeca Festival. The Los Angeles premiere took place at the Academy Museum of Motion Pictures on June 8, 2023. In Australia, it premiered on June 12, 2023, at the Sydney Film Festival. The film was theatrically released by Walt Disney Studios Motion Pictures in the United States on June 16, 2023, in RealD 3D, 4DX, and Dolby Cinema formats. It was accompanied in theaters by the Dug Days short film Carl's Date, marking the first Pixar film to be preceded by a fully Pixar-produced theatrical short film since Bao (2018), which was theatrically released with Incredibles 2 (2018). On February 16, 2023, following the commercial failures of Pixar's Lightyear and Walt Disney Animation Studios' Strange World (both 2022), Disney reportedly considered extending the theatrical windows for both Elemental and Walt Disney Animation Studios' Wish in hopes of bringing families back to theaters; Mamoudou Athie, who voices Wade, confirmed this on June 30, 2023, stating that Elemental would remain in theaters until Labor Day.

The first thirty minutes of footage of the film were shown during an early press event at the studio on March 28, 2023. It was positively received by critics for its worldbuilding, animation, and characters. The first twenty minutes of footage of the film were previewed in 3D at CinemaCon on April 26, 2023. It was positively received by critics, who appreciated its tackling themes of racism and xenophobia head-on.

=== Marketing ===
Following the project announcement, the first look concept art of the film was released on May 16, 2022. Nicole Clark for Polygon said fans are "pointing out the similarities to the Fireboy and Watergirl series of games, six in total, developed by Oslo Albet." Following the voice cast announcement, a first look image and an exclusive teaser poster were released on September 9, 2022, during the 2022 D23 Expo Presentation. The teaser trailer was released on November 17, 2022, set to Bakar's "Hell N Back". It depicts an original scene where a vast subway train approaches on a waterway with Ember being entered at Element City and then meets Wade. Similar to most of Pixar's teaser trailers, the scene was not present in the final film. Jeremy Mathai of /Film commented positively of the footage, saying it "looks wonderfully rendered and irresistibly charming". An official full-length trailer was released on March 28, 2023, set to Astral's "High Five". Charles Pulliam-Moore of The Verge commented positively, saying that "the movie's visuals are as imaginative as they are delightful", while noting that its "tough to say whether Elemental's take on beats from Guess Who's Coming to Dinner will land with audiences, especially considering how some of its characters seem prone to destroying one another simply because of how their physical forms interact."

The film was also promoted on the season 21 finale of the ABC singing competition, American Idol, where the main characters, Ember and Wade, are seen cheering in the audience after Iam Tongi was crowned the winner. A sneak peek was shown immediately after the conclusion of the show.

A series of books based on the film was published in May 2023, including novelizations, short stories, a sticker album, a behind-the-scenes book, and coloring books, while the graphic novel was published on August 29, 2023. A line of action figures and toy packs by Mattel were gifted, while visiting the studios for the film's press day. It was available for the following month.

=== Home media ===
Walt Disney Studios Home Entertainment released Elemental for digital download on August 15, 2023. It was then released on Ultra HD Blu-ray, Blu-ray, and DVD on September 26, 2023. The Ultra HD Blu-ray and Blu-ray copies contain deleted scenes, behind-the-scenes featurettes, an audio commentary, and the short Carl's Date. It was released on Disney+ on September 13, 2023, along with a making-of documentary Good Chemistry: The Story of Elemental.

Disney announced that Elemental garnered 26.4 million views in the five days following its release on Disney+, making it the most-streamed animated film on the platform during its premiere week since Turning Red (2022). Disney defines views as total stream time divided by runtime. Nielsen Media Research, which records streaming viewership on certain U.S. television screens, reported that the film had accumulated 8.5 billion minutes of watch time between 2020 and 2025, ranking No. 10 among the most-streamed films during that time frame.

== Reception ==
=== Box office ===
Elemental grossed $154.4 million in the United States and Canada, and $342 million in other territories, for a worldwide gross of $496.4 million. Analysts considered Elemental's success to be an example of a sleeper hit. (Note: Attributed to multiple references:)

In the United States and Canada, Elemental was released alongside The Flash and The Blackening, and was originally projected to gross $35–40 million from 4,035 theaters in its opening weekend. The film made $11.8 million on its first day (including $2.4 million from Thursday night previews), lowering estimates to $30 million. The film went on to debut to $29.5 million, finishing in second and marking the second lowest three-day opening weekend for a Pixar film, behind the $29.1 million ($56 million with inflation) opening of Toy Story in 1995, which sold significantly more tickets. Deadline Hollywood and TheWrap attributed the reasons for the low opening being the film's marketing, audiences getting used to waiting for Pixar films to be released on Disney+ instead of in theaters as a result of the COVID-19 pandemic, and competition from Spider-Man: Across the Spider-Verse, despite receiving positive word-of-mouth.

In its second weekend, the film made $18.4 million, finishing in second. While the 38% drop was noted as a good sign of future legs, TheWrap noted: "it would take endurance of historical proportions for Elemental to make the comeback to profitability." During Elemental's fourth weekend, Variety wrote that while the film held well weeks after a "disastrous opening" there would be "no hope of recouping its $200 million production budget domestically."

By early August, Elemental managed to make a drastic turnaround, with many news outlets noting Pixar's box office comeback upon the film grossing $400 million worldwide. Disney released an official statement, with Tony Chambers, Disney's EVP of Theatrical Distribution stating "After a disappointing opening weekend, we're really pleased that audiences have discovered what a great movie it is." That same month, Pixar's president Jim Morris said "at the box office we're looking at now, [the film] should do better than break even theatrically. And then we have revenue from streaming, theme parks and consumer products. This will certainly be a profitable film for the Disney company." The Hollywood Reporter noted that by the end of the summer box office season, Elemental had grossed above $480 million worldwide.

Internationally, Elemental performed particularly well in South Korea, which became the film's third-largest market. This was attributed to director Peter Sohn's Korean-American background and the incorporation of elements that resonated with Korean audiences. By August 20, 2023, Elemental had surpassed Across the Spider-Verse's international box office total.

=== Critical response ===
On the review aggregator website Rotten Tomatoes, 73% of 267 critics' reviews are positive, with an average rating of 6.5/10. The website's consensus reads: "Elemental may not satisfy as fully as the greatest Pixar pictures, but it remains a solid story told with dazzling visual flair." Metacritic, which uses a weighted average, assigned the film a score of 58 out of 100, based on 45 critics, indicating "mixed or average" reviews. Audiences polled by CinemaScore gave the film an average grade of "A" on an A+ to F scale, while PostTrak reported 85% of filmgoers gave it a positive score, with 68% saying they would definitely recommend it.

Following its premiere at Cannes, early social media reactions to the film were reportedly positive, while reviews from film critics were "underwhelming", ranking it "among the studio's worst releases to date". Critics generally praised the film's visuals, but had a more divided reaction to its script. Docter was surprised by the negative reviews and the overall mixed reception, and believed that critics' tendency to compare the film not only to other works but also to their own past successes led to "pretty nasty" reviews that overshadowed the film's merits. According to some publications, after its wider release, the film started to get more positive reviews.

James Berardinelli, film critic for ReelViews, awarded the film 3 out of 4 stars writing, "Every frame in Elemental is vivid and replete with detail. In real time, there's far too much going on to absorb. The visuals – from the amazing skyline shots to the less ostentatious presentations of the main characters – are crisp and colorful. Thomas Newman's score is nondescript but this isn't a musical so it obeys the cardinal rule of not being intrusive. The voices are primarily provided by lesser-known actors (Catherine O'Hara arguably being the highest profile name), which enhances the viewer's immersion." Ben Croll of TheWrap wrote, "With story beats and character turns that strain well beyond familiarity, Elemental matches formal adventure with storytelling timidity. Here is a new spin on the old formula, livened up by advances in technology and delivered with real artistry." Siddhant Adlakha of IndieWire gave the film a B, and wrote in his review, "Despite its confused and overstuffed worldbuilding, Elemental has enough charming moments to get by, even if its meaning lies less in its ill-conceived immigrant saga, and more in the personal drama that lives a few layers beneath it." Amy Nicholson of The New York Times called the film, "Oddly, it's the most human rom-com in years." Leigh Paatsch of Herald Sun awarded the film 4 out of 5 stars, writing, "The movie is great fun, too, landing in that hard-to-find, yet easy-to-enjoy sweet spot where a relatable romantic comedy meets an exciting tale of both adventure and redemption."

Dirk Libbey of CinemaBlend awarded the film 4 out of 5 stars, writing, "People falling in love in animated films is certainly nothing new; it happens all the time. However, we're never seen a major animation studio like Pixar produce such a purely romantic film as Elemental. And yes, you will cry." Chris Bumbray of JoBlo.com gave the film a 7 out of 10, stating: "At its heart, Elemental is a rom-com, which, oddly enough, is a rare thing these days. Leah Lewis and Mamoudou Athie (who was great in the Netflix movie Uncorked) have good chemistry, and there's a sweetness to their tentative romance that hasn't been seen in a mainstream movie in too long. Sometimes you almost forget you're watching animation as the two characters feel alive. However, at a certain point, you realize this is a nice movie but perhaps not as resonant as their best work. It's sweet and entertaining in the same way Onward is, meaning it's second-tier Pixar – below the classics like Wall-E and Up, but far above any of the Cars movies, Elio, Lightyear, etc." (Note: This review was written before the release of Elio.) Sandie Angulo Chen of Common Sense Media gave the film 4 out of 5 stars, writing: "Elemental does touchingly delve into the challenges and triumphs of being the child of refugees and growing up immersed in a culturally homogenous community. It shows both the comfort and strength of being around your own people."

Jordan Mintzer from The Hollywood Reporter stated, "[It] may be the first work from Pixar to feel like it was generated entirely by AI". Eileen Jones from Jacobin called the film "so boring and unmemorable that it seems like a new low for the famed animation company." Screen Daily's Tim Grierson noted that the film "contains hints of the studio's wit and poignancy while lacking the inspired execution that once seemed so effortless." Dan Kois from Slate praised the visuals of Element City, but criticized the screenplay, the chemistry between its two main characters, and handling of different elemental groups within the film, comparing the conflict between Ember and her family unfavorably to Turning Red (2022). Kois believed that Pixar, known for its trademark humor, earned plot twists, and attention to detail, needed to overhaul its formula to regain its former success. David Fear of Rolling Stone criticized the film's heavy-handed message, writing, "The fact that Elemental can't seem to get past its own elevator-pitch premise or avoid tripping over its teachable lessons, much less wring laughs and sobs from an opposites-attract love story, is a bit of a shock. It's so busy trying to pen an op-ed that it forgets to give it a narrative structure and make it emotionally resonate. That's just elementary."

Filmmaker Carlos López Estrada cited Elemental as among his favorite films of 2023, describing the film as "Celebrating Pixar genius and a powerful immigration love story told in the most ingenious of ways."

In a 2025 research article, authors Linsay M. Cramer and Gabriel A. Cruz argued that the logic of the film's central race allegory—using elements as stand-ins for human racial groups—has prejudicial consequences. They stated that the film portraying water and fire (representing white people and non-white immigrants, respectively) as biologically different groups that harm each other with their presence undercuts modern understandings of racial groups as social constructs and effectively frames immigrant groups as societal contaminants. Additionally, Cramer and Cruz said the plot point of Wade's family encouraging Ember to make her glass-making a career exemplifies the commercialization of ethnic skills and culture in predominantly white societies.

=== Accolades ===
Accolades received by Elemental
Award	Date of ceremony	Category	Recipient(s)	Result	Ref.
Hollywood Music in Media Awards	November 15, 2023	Best Original Score — Animated Film	Thomas Newman	Nominated	
Hollywood Music in Media Awards	November 15, 2023	Best Original Song — Animated Film	"Steal The Show" — Lauv, Michael Matosic, and Thomas Newman	Nominated	
Hollywood Professional Association Awards	November 28, 2023	Outstanding Color Grading — Animated Theatrical Feature	Susan Brunig	Nominated	
Washington D.C. Area Film Critics Association Awards	December 10, 2023	Best Animated Feature	Elemental	Nominated	
St. Louis Film Critics Association Awards	December 17, 2023	Best Animated Film	Elemental	Nominated	
Women Film Critics Circle Awards	December 18, 2023	Best Animated Female	Leah Lewis	2nd Runner-up (Note: Shared with Chloë Grace Moretz for Nimona (2023))	
Alliance of Women Film Journalists	January 3, 2024	Best Animated Female	Leah Lewis	Nominated	
Georgia Film Critics Association Awards	January 5, 2024	Best Animated Film	Elemental	Nominated	
Astra Film and Creative Arts Awards	January 6, 2024	Best Animated Feature	Elemental	Nominated	
Astra Film and Creative Arts Awards	January 6, 2024	Best Score	Thomas Newman	Nominated	
Golden Globe Awards	January 7, 2024	Best Animated Feature Film	Elemental	Nominated	
San Francisco Bay Area Film Critics Circle Awards	January 9, 2024	Best Animated Feature	Elemental	Nominated	
Austin Film Critics Association Awards	January 10, 2024	Best Animated Film	Elemental	Nominated	
Critics' Choice Movie Awards	January 14, 2024	Best Animated Feature	Elemental	Nominated	
ADG Excellence in Production Design Awards	February 10, 2024	Excellence in Production Design for an Animated Film	Don Shank	Nominated	
Annie Awards	February 17, 2024	Outstanding Achievement for Animated Effects in an Animated Production	Chris Chapman, Tim Speltz, Krzysztof Rost, Amit Baadkar, Ravindra Dwivedi	Nominated	
Annie Awards	February 17, 2024	Outstanding Achievement for Character Animation in an Animated Feature Production	Jessica Torres	Nominated	
Annie Awards	February 17, 2024	Outstanding Achievement for Character Design in an Animated Feature Production	Maria Yi	Nominated	
Annie Awards	February 17, 2024	Outstanding Achievement for Music in an Animated Feature Production	Thomas Newman, Lauv	Nominated	
Annie Awards	February 17, 2024	Outstanding Achievement for Production Design in an Animated Feature Production	Don Shank, Maria Yi, Dan Holland, Jennifer Chang, Laura Meyer	Nominated	
Annie Awards	February 17, 2024	Outstanding Achievement for Editorial in an Animated Feature Production	Stephen Schaffer, Amera Rizk, Gregory Snyder, Jen Jew, and Kevin Rose-Williams	Nominated	
Satellite Awards	February 18, 2024	Best Animated or Mixed Media Feature	Elemental	Nominated	
Visual Effects Society Awards	February 21, 2024	Outstanding Visual Effects in an Animated Feature	Peter Sohn, Denise Ream, Sanjay Bakshi, Stephen Marshall	Nominated	
Visual Effects Society Awards	February 21, 2024	Outstanding Animated Character in an Animated Feature	Gwendelyn Enderoglu, Jared Fong, Jonathan Hoffman, Patrick Witting (for Ember)	Nominated	
Visual Effects Society Awards	February 21, 2024	Outstanding Animated Character in an Animated Feature	Max Gilbert, Jacob Kuenzel, Dave Strick, Benjamin Su (for Wade)	Nominated	
Visual Effects Society Awards	February 21, 2024	Outstanding Created Environment in an Animated Feature	Chris Bernardi, Brandon Montell, David Shavers, Ting Zhang (for Element City)	Nominated	
Visual Effects Society Awards	February 21, 2024	Outstanding Effects Simulations in an Animated Feature	Kristopher Campbell, Greg Gladstone, Jon Reisch, Kylie Wijsmuller	Nominated	
Visual Effects Society Awards	February 21, 2024	Emerging Technology Award	Vinicius C. Azevedo, Byungsoo Kim, Raphael Ortiz, Paul Kanyuk (for Volumetric Neural Style Transfer)	Nominated	
British Academy Film Awards	February 18, 2024	Best Animated Film	Elemental	Nominated	
Saturn Awards	February 4, 2024	Best Animated Film	Elemental	Nominated	
Producers Guild of America Awards	February 25, 2024	Outstanding Producer of Animated Theatrical Motion Pictures	Elemental	Nominated	
Cinema Audio Society Awards	March 2, 2024	Outstanding Achievement in Sound Mixing for Motion Picture – Animated	Vince Caro, Paul McGrath, Stephen Urata, Ren Klyce, Thomas Vicari, Scott Curtis	Nominated	
Academy Awards	March 10, 2024	Best Animated Feature	Peter Sohn and Denise Ream	Nominated	
Nickelodeon Kids' Choice Awards	July 13, 2024	Favorite Animated Movie	Elemental	Nominated	
