= Leah Lewis =

American actress (born 1996)

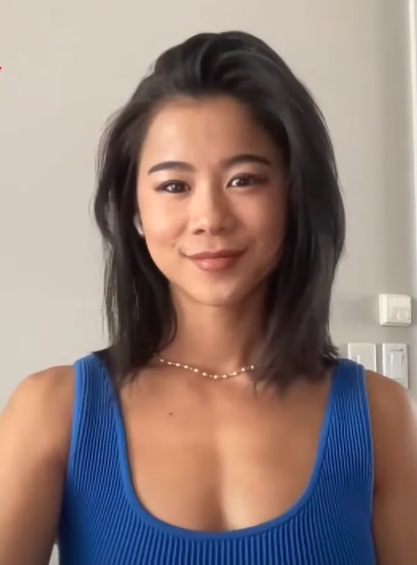
- Lewis in July 2023
- Born: December 9, 1996 (age 29); Shanghai, China
- Occupation: Actress
- Years active: 2005–present
- Known for: Nancy Drew; The Half of It

Leah Marie Liang Lewis (born December 9, 1996) is a Chinese-born American actress. She is best known for her roles as Georgia "George" Fan in The CW series adaptation of Nancy Drew (2019–2023) and Ellie Chu in the Netflix comedy-drama film The Half of It (2020). She also starred in a lead voice role as Ember Lumen in the Pixar animated film Elemental (2023), and portrays attorney Sarah Franklin in the legal drama series Matlock (2024–present).

== Early life and education ==
Lewis was adopted from an orphanage in Shanghai when she was six months old and raised in Windermere, Florida. Her younger, non-biologically related sister, Lydia, was later adopted from the same orphanage. Their parents, Frederick and Lorraine Lewis, are both realtors.

Leah discovered performing arts at Crenshaw School in Orlando, Florida. She attended Thornebrooke Elementary School in Ocoee, Florida and Southwest Middle School in Orlando. She and her mother moved back and forth between Los Angeles and Orlando during her teen years. At 17, she went back to Orlando to finish high school at Olympia High School and then moved back to Los Angeles by herself at 20 in 2016.

== Career ==
At a young age, Lewis started acting in commercials. Once her family moved to Los Angeles, she acted in the 2012 Nickelodeon film, Fred 3: Camp Fred as the character Spoon.

In 2013, she auditioned for the fourth season of The Voice, singing "Blown Away" by Carrie Underwood. None of the coaches turned their chairs, meaning that she did not make it onto the show.

In 2015 and 2016, she was featured in the Disney shows Best Friends Whenever and Gamer's Guide to Pretty Much Everything. She also was a main character on season 2 of the Michelle Trachtenberg-produced Go90 web series, Guidance. Once she moved back to Los Angeles after graduating from high school, she began booking roles in TV shows like Station 19 and The Good Doctor. She had a recurring role in The CW series Charmed. She then later joined the main cast of another The CW show, a 2019 TV adaptation of Nancy Drew on which she plays Georgia "George" Fan, based on the original character George Fayne.

Her first major film role was as the lead character, Ellie Chu, in the 2020 Netflix film, The Half of It. She starred alongside Mamoudou Athie in the 2023 Pixar animated film Elemental directed by Peter Sohn, which she voiced the character Ember Lumen in her main role of the film. In 2024 she was cast as Räv in Paramount's animated film The Tiger's Apprentice.

== Personal life ==
Beyond acting, Lewis sings, plays guitar, and does photography. In May 2016, she began dating singer and actor Payson Lewis.

On September 26, 2025, Lewis was allegedly assaulted by co-star David Del Rio during production of Matlock. Upon her report of the incident, Del Rio was promptly fired.

== Filmography ==
=== Film ===
Year	Title	Role	Notes
2007	Nanking	Banner Girl	
2020	The Half of It	Ellie Chu	
2020	How to Deter a Robber	Heather Williams	
2023	Elemental	Ember Lumen (voice)	
2024	The Tiger's Apprentice	Räv (voice)	
TBA	Dog Years		Post-production

=== Television ===
Year	Title	Role	Notes
2006	The New Adventures of Old Christine	Tess	Episode: "The Passion of the Christine"
2006	Paloozaville	Leah	
2012	Fred 3: Camp Fred	Spoon	Television film
2012	Madison High	Peyton Hall	Pilot
2013	The Voice	Herself - Contestant	Blind Auditions
2015–2016	Gamer's Guide to Pretty Much Everything	Lika	2 episodes
2016	Best Friends Whenever	Alex	Episode: "Girl Code"
2018	Light as a Feather	Gabby Darwish	Episode: "Innocent as a Lamb"
2018	The Good Doctor	Katherine "Kitty" Kwon	Episode: "Tough Titmouse"
2018	Charmed	Angela Wu	3 episodes
2018–2019	Station 19	Shannon	2 episodes
2019	The Gifted	Young Clarice	Episode: "home"
2019–2023	Nancy Drew	Georgia "George" Fayne	Main role
2021	It's Pony	Max (voice)	2 episodes
2022–present	Batwheels	Cassandra Cain / Batgirl (voice)	Main role
2024–present	Matlock	Sarah Franklin	Main role

=== Web ===
Year	Title	Role	Notes
2016	Sing It!	Sophie Chu	Recurring role; 6 episodes
2016	Teens React	Herself	2 episodes
2016	Guidance	Liddy	Main role (season 2)
2018	My Dead Ex	Amber	Episode: "The Z Word"

=== Music videos ===
Song	Year	Artist	Notes
"Love Generation"	2005	Bob Sinclar featuring Gary Pine	

== Awards and nominations ==
Year	Award	Category	Work	Result	Ref.
2013	Young Artist Awards	Best Performance in a TV Movie, Miniseries, Special or Pilot - Leading Actress	Fred 3: Camp Fred	Nominated	
2016	Young Artist Awards	Best Performance in a TV Series - Guest Starring Actress	Gamer's Guide to Pretty Much Everything	Nominated	
2016	Young Entertainer Awards	Best Guest Starring Young Actress - Television Series	Best Friends Whenever	Nominated	
