= The Half of It =

2020 film by Alice Wu

- Release poster
- Directed by: Alice Wu
- Written by: Alice Wu
- Produced by: Anthony Bregman; M. Blair Breard; Alice Wu
- Starring: Leah Lewis; Daniel Diemer; Alexxis Lemire; Enrique Murciano; Wolfgang Novogratz; Catherine Curtin; Becky Ann Baker; Collin Chou
- Cinematography: Greta Zozula
- Edited by: Ian Blume; Lee Percy
- Music by: Anton Sanko
- Production company: Likely Story
- Distributed by: Netflix
- Release date: May 1, 2020
- Running time: 104 minutes
- Country: United States
- Language: English

The Half of It is a 2020 American coming-of-age comedy-drama film written, directed, and co-produced by Alice Wu. It stars Leah Lewis, Daniel Diemer, and Alexxis Lemire, with Enrique Murciano, Wolfgang Novogratz, Catherine Curtin, Becky Ann Baker, and Collin Chou in supporting roles. It is loosely inspired by Edmond Rostand's 1897 play Cyrano de Bergerac, and follows a Chinese-American student helping a jock classmate woo a girl whom, secretly, they both desire.

The film was released worldwide on Netflix on May 1, 2020. It received positive reviews from critics, who mostly praised Wu's direction and screenplay, as well as the performances of Lewis and Diemer. It was honored with the Founders Award for Best U.S. Narrative Feature at the 19th Tribeca Film Festival, while Wu was nominated for Best Screenplay at the 36th Independent Spirit Awards.

== Plot ==
Ellie Chu lives in the remote town of Squahamish with her grieving widower father, where she performs most of his station master and signalman duties. She makes extra money by ghostwriting essays for her classmates. The socially ostracized Ellie is secretly interested in Aster Flores, the beautiful daughter of the minister who is reluctantly dating Trig, a narcissistic popular boy from a wealthy family.

Ellie's next-door neighbor Paul Munsky, an inarticulate football team member and part of a family sausage business, asks Ellie to help him by ghostwriting a love letter from him to Aster. Ellie eventually agrees to help in order to help pay her family's bills. Posing as Paul, Ellie begins a heartfelt correspondence with Aster about their shared interests in art and literature through letters and text messages.

Ellie's supportive English teacher encourages her to apply to Grinnell College after noticing the proficiency of the essays she ghostwrote, but Ellie plans to attend Eastern Washington University and stay in Squahamish to be near her father.

Ellie sets up Paul on a date with Aster, but it goes poorly due to his obtuseness and poor conversational skills. Ellie plans to stop helping Paul, but reconsiders when he defends her from bullies. Ellie begins teaching Paul about art and literature so he can convincingly portray the persona she has created for him with Aster.

Ellie watches from outside the restaurant as Paul's second date with Aster starts off as badly as the first. In a desperate bid to save it, Ellie sends Aster text messages via a user account she and Paul secretly share, while Paul plays along by pretending to type on his phone. The next day, Paul tells Ellie that he kissed Aster - without encouragement from her, and despite their telling Aster that Paul wanted to keep their relationship platonic - unnerving Ellie.

Paul thwarts bullies' attempts to sabotage Ellie's school talent show performance, and she earns a standing ovation. Later, Paul is moved by the discovery that Ellie is secretly writing to regional food critics, attempting to gain recognition for Paul's culinary innovation, the "taco sausage".

Aster takes Ellie to a secluded hot spring where they share an intimate conversation. Ellie discusses her atheism, while Aster reveals that Trig intends to marry her. After Aster takes Ellie back home, Aster comes across Paul, and questions him, verifying that he believes in God, in contrast to Ellie and some of the things she has said during their correspondence. From her bedroom window Ellie watches Aster pull Paul in for a kiss, after which she decides to send the application to Grinnell.

At a school football game, Aster cheers for Paul, but Paul is more thrilled by Ellie's cheers and with her motivation scores the team's first touchdown in fifteen years. Afterwards, mistakenly perceiving them to have developed feelings for each other, Paul attempts to kiss Ellie, but she rejects his advance. They realize Aster has seen this happen, and she leaves, looking upset. Paul intuits from Ellie's reaction that Ellie loves Aster. Shocked, he dumbly repeats religious dogma, saying that Ellie is a sinner and will go to hell. Later, when Paul delivers meat to Ellie's father, they have a conversation about the meaning of love. Paul comes to terms with Ellie's sexuality and chooses to love her as she is.

Trig publicly proposes to Aster at church, only to be stopped by Ellie and then Paul, who lectures the congregants about love and authenticity. Aster recognizes Ellie's words from a previous letter and realizes that Ellie had been the one writing to her all along. She slaps Paul and storms out.

Before leaving for Grinnell, Ellie apologizes to Aster for deceiving her. Aster tells her she has decided to reject Trig's proposal and attend art school to develop her painting, which Ellie encouraged, and admits feelings for Ellie. Ellie kisses Aster and tells her that she will see her in a couple of years.

Paul, now confident about innovations he wants to make to the family business, sees Ellie off at the train platform, promising to continue visiting her father. Imitating a scene in Ek Villain, a film they watched and discussed together, Paul runs alongside Ellie's moving train, provoking Ellie's laughter along with tears.

== Cast ==
- Leah Lewis as Ellie Chu, a shy, introverted, Chinese-American straight-A student
- Daniel Diemer as Paul Munsky, a school jock whom Ellie helps out by writing love letters
- Alexxis Lemire as Aster Flores, the daughter of a local deacon
- Collin Chou as Edwin Chu, Ellie's father
- Wolfgang Novogratz as Trig Carson, Aster's boyfriend
- Becky Ann Baker as Mrs. Geselschap
- Catherine Curtin as Colleen Munsky, Paul's mother
- Enrique Murciano as Deacon Flores, Aster's father

== Production ==
Alice Wu started writing The Half of It in the aftermath of the 2016 United States presidential election. The screenplay drew inspiration from the 1897 play Cyrano de Bergerac by Edmond Rostand. In April 2019, it was announced that Leah Lewis, Alexxis Lemire, Daniel Diemer, Becky Ann Baker, Catherine Curtin, Wolfgang Novogratz, and Enrique Murciano joined the cast of the film, with Wu directing and Netflix distributing. Anthony Bregman of Likely Story, M. Blair Breard, and Wu served as producers, and Likely Story's Erica Matlin and Greg Zuk executive produced. In June 2019, it was announced that Collin Chou had joined the cast.

The film's name alludes to love as discussed in Plato's Symposium - which was cited in the opening sequence and structured various visual motifs.

=== Filming ===
Principal photography began on April 22, 2019, in New York, and concluded on May 31, 2019. The Adirondack Scenic Railroad station in Thendera, New York, was used for the station that Ellie's father is the stationmaster of, and the train that comes through is the Adirondak Scenic Railroad. The movie theater in which Paul, Ellie, and Aster watch a movie is the Strand Theater in Old Forge, New York.

== Release ==
The Half of It was scheduled to have its world premiere at the Tribeca Film Festival on April 18, 2020. However, due to the COVID-19 pandemic, the festival was postponed. It was released on May 1, 2020.

Wu did a test screening in a small conservative suburb to know how those morally aligned against the movie would feel about it. She was surprised that "[p]eople marked the film as ‘excellent’ and they said they're politically conservative". She gleaned that "there are a lot of closeted people who are actually starting to change their mind", and that Netflix could better reach them—even though a theatrical release would "be better for you as a filmmaker in terms of cachet". When probed by a Netflix executive on her intentions for writing the film, she realized that "people are not going to go to the theater to watch this movie but in the privacy of their own home".

== Reception ==
=== Critical response ===
On the review aggregator website Rotten Tomatoes, 97% of 104 critics' reviews are positive, with an average rating of 7.8/10. The website's consensus reads: "For viewers in search of an uncommonly smart, tender, and funny coming-of-age story, The Half of It has everything." Metacritic, which uses a weighted average, assigned the film a score of 74 out of 100, based on 23 critics, indicating "generally favorable" reviews.

Decider said the plot is "an unbearably cute premise—a modern-day Cyrano de Bergerac with a queer twist—that seems so perfect and so obvious, it’s a wonder the movie hasn’t been made yet", and "an adorable teen film that will no doubt service an extremely underserved audience." Rolling Stone praised the direction, stating that "the gentle touch Wu uses as a filmmaker, which only occasionally drifts into tidiness, does not dull the edges of her quietly revolutionary achievement in telling the story of a young lesbian immigrant’s journey to self-acceptance. In a movie brimming over with the pleasures of the unexpected, that’s the best part." The New York Times noted that "Wu suffuses the film with a painfully mature understanding of the ache of longing for the impossible."

Bitch magazine wrote that "while these teenage-focused [...] movies flirt with the idea of lesbian relationships, they quickly pivot before their casual interest can evolve into any fully realized romance", with the film's story seeming "to be more about the halfway happiness Ellie's given: maybe some acceptance, maybe a friend, maybe a first love. It's not the happy story we were sold via the trailer, and it feels like more promises that only halfway delivered."

Leah Lewis told Teen Vogue in an interview on 1 May 2020 that: "Most people think a love story has an equation, and that's usually boy meets girl, girl meets boy, or girl meets girl." However, in this case "[i]t's a self-love story because these characters don't really end up with each other, but at the very end, they end up with something. For me, that's even more valuable than just finding your other half; it's finding a part of yourself along the way. It is a love story, it's just not a 'romance' story."

In a post dated May 22, 2020, A.O. Scott recommended it as his top film of 2020 so far. Similarly, Educating Georgia's film expert Steph chose it as 2020 film of the year in a retrospective of the year's films.

Christy Lemire on RogerEbert.com found the film's "languid" pacing to be a double-edged sword.

=== Accolades ===
The Half of It won the top prize, the Founders Award for Best U.S. Narrative Feature, at the 2020 Tribeca Film Festival. The film was nominated for Best Screenplay (for Wu) at the 36th Independent Spirit Awards, and for Outstanding Film – Limited Release at the 32nd GLAAD Media Awards.
